= Diana Whitney =

American author, consultant and educator

Diana Whitney (born 1948) is an American author, award-winning consultant and educator whose writings – 15 books and dozens of chapters and articles – have advanced the positive principles and practices of appreciative inquiry and social constructionist theory worldwide. Her work as a scholar practitioner has furthered both research and practice in the fields of appreciative leadership and positive organization development. She was awarded Vallarta Institute’s Annual 2X2 (Two by Two) Recreate the World Award.

She is President of the Corporation for Positive Change (an international consulting group that she founded); a Fellow of the World Business Academy;, a Founder and director emeritus of the Taos Institute and a founding advisor to the United Religions Initiative.

Whitney earned her PhD from Temple University. She currently teaches and advises students in the capacity of distinguished consulting faculty at Saybrook University and as faculty advisor for the Taos Tilburg PhD Program.

== Social innovations ==
In 1991 Whitney along with Kenneth Gergen, Mary Gergen, Sheila McNamme, Harlene Anderson, David Cooperrider and Suresh Srivastva founded the Taos Institute as a community of scholars and practitioners dedicated to furthering relational practices in the fields of organization development, family therapy and education. There are now over 250 associates around the world.

From 1995 until 2009 Whitney served as an advisor and facilitator in the design and development of the United Religions Initiative, a global inter-faith organization dedicated to peace. It was for this purpose that Whitney and David Cooperrider created the processes that Whitney entitled the Appreciative Inquiry Summit.

Whitney worked with Case Western Reserve University Weatherhead School of Management faculty David Cooperrider and Ron Fry to assess the need for and design the first Master's of positive organization development program.

== Research ==
In her 1980 dissertation, funded by the National Institute of Education, Whitney studied and mapped the processes used for the dissemination of educational innovations. Her relational consultative model of the work of dissemination linking agents was implemented in educational R&D laboratories across the country.

Whitney's most recent research, conducted in partnership with Kae Rader and AmandaTrosten-Bloom, focuses on leadership and positive power. Through a qualitative research process employing one-on-one interviews and focus groups, they discovered and subsequently confirmed five factors related to appreciative leadership: inquiry, inclusion, illumination, inspiration and integrity. The results are published in their book, Appreciative Leadership: Focus on What Works to Drive Winning Performance and Build a Thriving Organization.

In partnership with Jeff Jackson and Maurice Monette of the Vallarta Institute and funded by a grant from the Reynolds Foundation, Whitney is currently engaged in research on the impact of appreciative inquiry in Cuba.

== Awards ==
- 1997 - American Society for Training and Development, Excellence in Practice [Managing Change] Award
- 2004 - Organizational Development Network, Larry Porter Award
- 2005 – The Vallarta Institute, 2 x 2 Award for Cooperation Making a Positive Difference

== Consulting ==
As a scholar practitioner Whitney's consulting has directly touched people in 20 countries, and has indirectly transformed people's quality of work life in organizations around the world.

== Education ==
Whitney holds a B.A. in Speech Communication in 1970, an M.A., Classical Rhetorical Theory in 1972, and a PhD in 1980 in Organization Communication, all from Temple University in Philadelphia. Her doctoral thesis was "The Dissemination of Educational Innovations: A Case Study of the NIE Linking Process."

== Selected publications ==
According to worldCat,

=== Books written ===
- Natalie May, Daniel Becker, Richard Frankel, Julie Haizlip, Rebecca Harmon, Margaret Plews-Ogan, John Schorling, Anne Williams, Diana Whitney. Appreciative Inquiry in Healthcare: Positive Questions to Bring out the Best, Crown Custom Publishing, 2011. ISBN 978-1-933403-23-6. Its French translation Pratique de l'Appreciative Inquiry dans les établissements de santé was published in 2019.
- Diana Whitney, Kae Rader, Amanda Trosten-Bloom. Appreciative Leadership: Focus on What Works to Drive Winning Performance and Build a Thriving Organization. McGraw-Hill, 2010. ISBN 978-0-07-171406-8.
- Diana Kaplin Whitney; Amanda Trosten-Bloom. The Power of Appreciative Inquiry. First ed. 2003, 2nd ed. 2010, Berrett-Koehler Publishers, 2010. ISBN 978-1-60509-328-4.
- Dawn Cooperrider Dole, Diane Whitney, Jen Silbert, and Ada Jo Mann. Positive Family Dynamics. Taos Institute Publications, 2008. ISBN 978-0-9712312-9-0.
- David L. Cooperrider, Diana Whitney, Jacqueline Stavros. Essentials of Appreciative Inquiry, Crown Custom Publishing, Inc., 2008. ISBN 978-1-933403-205.
- David L Cooperrider; Diana Whitney; Jacqueline Stavros. Appreciative Inquiry Handbook. Lakeshore Communications, 2003. Second Edition, Crown Communication, 2007. ISBN 978-1-893435-17-9.
- Harlene Anderson, Diane Whitney (with Ken Gergen, Mary Gergen, Sheila McNamee and David Cooperrider). The Appreciative Organization, Taos Institute Publications, 2001. Second Edition, 2007. ISBN 978-0-9712312-7-6.
- David L Cooperrider; Diana Kaplin Whitney (1999) Appreciative Inquiry: A Positive Revolution in Change, Second Edition, Berrett-Koehler Publishers, 2005. ISBN 978-1-57675-356-9.
- Diana Whitney, Amanda Trosten-Bloom, Jay Cherney, Ron Fry. Appreciative Team Building:Positive Questions to Bring Out the Best of Your Team. iUniverse, Inc., 2005. ISBN 0-595-33503-9.
- James D. Ludema, Diana Whitney, Bernard J. Mohr, Thomas J. Griffin. Appreciative Inquiry Summit: A Practitioner’s Guide for Leading Large-Group Change, Berrett-Koehler Publishers, Inc., 2003. ISBN 1-57675-248-8.
- Cynthia Sampson, Mohammed Abu-Nimer, Claudia Liebler, Diana Whitney. Positive Approaches to Peacebuilding: A Resource for Innovators, Pact Publications, 2003. ISBN 978-0-9819076-3-5.
- Whitney, Diana (with Amanda Trosten-Bloom, David Cooperrider and Brian Kaplin). Encyclopedia of Positive Questions, Volume 1: Bringing Out the Best of Your Organization, Crown Communications, 2002. ISBN 978-1-893435-33-9.

=== Books edited ===
- David L Cooperrider; Peter F Sorensen; Diana Whitney; Therese F Yaeger, eds. Appreciative Inquiry: Rethinking Human and Organization Toward a Positive Theory of Change. Stipes Publishing, 2000. ISBN 978-0-87563-931-4.
- David L Cooperrider; Peter F Sorensen; Therese F Yaeger; Diana Whitney eds. (with David Cooperrider, Peter Sorenson and Therese Yaeger). Appreciative Inquiry: An Emerging Direction for Organization Development. Stipes Publishing, 2001. ISBN 978-1-58874-121-9.
- Ronald Fry; Frank Barrett; Jane Seiling; Diana Kaplin Whitney; David Cooperrider, eds. Appreciative Inquiry and Organization Transformation: Reports from the Field, Quorum Books, 2002. ISBN 978-1-56720-458-2.
- Peter F Sorensen; Therese F Yaeger; Diana Whitney; David L Cooperrider, eds. Appreciative Inquiry: Foundations in Positive Organization Development, edited with David Cooperrider, Peter Sorenson and Therese Yaeger. Stipes Publishing, 2005. ISBN 978-1-58874-472-2.

=== Articles written ===
- Diana Whitney, Ph.D., Amanda Trosten Bloom. Appreciative Inquiry Summits: All Voices, All Opinions, All Ideas: Published by The Taos Institute, June 2013.
- Diana Whitney, Ph.D. Macro Management of Meaning and Identity: Explorations Into the Magic of Macro-Management and Crowdsourcing: Published by the International Journal of Appreciative Inquiry, Vol. 14, No. 2, May 2012.
- Diana Whitney, Ph.D. Appreciative Inquiry: Changing the World one Story at a Time: Published in StoryWorks, November 23, 2010.
- Diana Whitney, Ph.D., Amanda Trosten-Bloom and Kae Rader. Leading Positive Performance: A Conversation about Appreciative Leadership: Published in Performance Improvement Journal, Wiley InterScience, Vol. 49, no. 3, March 2010.
- Diana Whitney, Ph.D. Appreciative Inquiry: Creating Spiritual Resonance in the Workplace: Published in Journal of Management, Spirituality & Religion, Volume 7, Issue 1 March 2010.
- Diana Whitney, Ph.D. Appreciative Inquiry: A Process for Designing Life-Affirming Organizations: Published by AI Practitioner (November 2008).
- Diana Whitney, Ph.D. Appreciative Leadership and Participatory Planning: Published in Participatory Quarterly, December 2007, The Journal of the International Association of Participatory Planning.
- Diana Whitney, Ph.D., Charles Gibbs. Appreciative Inquiry: Creating Cultures of Positive Participation: Published by OD Practitioner, Vol. 38, No. 4, Fall (2006).
- Diana Whitney, Ph.D. Spirituality as an Organizing Principle: Published by Unity Magazine, March/April 2006.
- Diana Whitney, Ph.D., Bernard J. Mohr and Stephen P. Fitzgerald. Secrets To Initiating and Contracting For Successful Large Inquiries: Establishing Relational Context: Published by AI Practitioner (2006).
- Diana Whitney, Ph.D. An Open Invitation to the Appreciative: Published by AI Practitioner, November 2004.
- Diana Whitney, Ph.D. and Amanda Trosten-Bloom. The Appreciative Organization as a Liberating Space: Published by AI Practitioner (2004).
- Diana Whitney, Ph.D. Appreciative Inquiry and the Elevation of Organizational Consciousness: Chapter in Advances In Appreciative Inquiry Vol. 1: Constructive Discourse and Human Organization. Ed. David L. Cooperrider and Michel Avital. San Diego, CA: ELSEVIER, Inc., 2004.
- Diana Whitney, Ph.D., Amanda Trosten-Bloom, David Cooperrider and Nadya Zhexembayeva. Business as Agent of World Benefit: A Worldwide Action Research Project Using Appreciative Inquiry: Published by OD Practitioner, Vol. 35, No. 3 (2003).
- Diana Whitney, Ph.D. Spirituality as a Global Organizing Potential: Published by Reflections, Vol. 3, No. 3, (Spring 2002).
- Diana Whitney, Ph.D. and David Cooperrider. The Appreciative Inquiry Summit: An Emerging Methodology for Whole System Positive Change: Published by OD Practitioner, Vol. 32, No. 1, (2000).
- Diana Whitney, Ph.D. and David Cooperrider. Exploring Appreciative Inquiry: Published by World Business Academy Perspectives, Vol. 14, No. 2, (June 2000).
- Diana Whitney, Ph.D. and David Cooperrider. Appreciative Inquiry: A Positive Revolution in Change: Chapter in The Change Handbook: Group Methods for Shaping the Future. Ed. Peggy Holman and Tom Devane. San Francisco, CA: Berrett-Koehler, 1999.
- Diana Whitney, Ph.D. Let's change the subject and change our organization: an appreciative inquiry approach to organization change: Published by Career Development International, Vol. 3, No. 7, (1998): 314–319. Print. Available through Emerald Insight.
- Diana Whitney, Ph.D. and David Cooperrider. The Appreciative Inquiry Summit: Overview and Applications: Published by Employment Relations Today, Vol. 25, No. 2, (Summer 1998).
- Diana Whitney, Ph.D., Carol Schau. Appreciative Inquiry: An Innovative Process for Organization Change: Published by Employment Relations Today, Vol. 25, No. 1, (Spring 1998).
- Diana Whitney, Ph.D. Partnership At Work: Perspectives On Business and Global Change: Published by World Business Academy Perspectives, Vol. 11, No. 1, (March 1997)..
- Diana Whitney, Ph.D. Spirituality as an Organizing Principle : Published in World Business Academy Perspectives, Volume 9, No. 4, 1995.
- Diana Whitney, Ph.D. Therapy and the Social Construction of Spirituality: Published by AFTA Newsletter, (Spring 1995).
- Diana Whitney, Ph.D. Postmodern Challenges to Org Development: Chapter in Human Resource Development: Global Changes and Strategies in 2000 AD. Ed. Uddesh Kohli and Dharni P Sinha. New Delhi, India: Allied, 1994.

=== Articles About Diana Whitney ===
- Interview with Diana Whitney, Positive Momentum, published by HR Magazine (Society for Human Resource Management), June 1, 2013.
- Book Review of the Power of Appreciative Inquiry, published by The Qualitative Report, June 1, 2013.
- Feature story, Academy Fellow Diana Whitney in Currents in Commerce, published by the World Business Academy, July 15, 2010.
- Online interview with Amanda Trosten-Bloom: “New Book Shares How to Build Thriving Organizations Through Appreciative Leadership.” Axiom News, Ontario, Canada, July 15, 2010.
- Diana Whitney Interview with President of Chesapeake Bay OD Network: February, 2010.
- Book Review of the Appreciative Inquiry Handbook, published by Blog Business World. August, 2008.
- IAP2 Core Values Award for Project of the Year – Citywide Strategic Plan for Longmont, Colorado: Excerpted from February 2007 issue of Participation Quarterly, by the International Association for Public Participation.
- The Art of Appreciative Inquiry: Theodore Kinni. Published in HBS Working Knowledge (Faculty Research at Harvard Business School), September 22, 2003.
