= Jack Kessler =

American hazzan and musician (1944–2024)

Jack A. Kessler (1944 – September 20, 2024) was an American hazzan, musician, and educator. After working as a cantor for synagogues for 20 years, he organized several musical ensembles including Atzilut, a group of Jewish and Arab musicians, which toured venues around the world including the United Nations. He also adopted the practice of chanting trop for haftarah and other biblical texts in both Hebrew and English to make the text more vivid and alive for synagogue worshippers.

== Early life and education ==
Kessler was born in 1944 and grew up in Boston. His parents had immigrated to the United States in 1941 to escape the Nazis. His father, Rabbi Martin Kessler, taught him nusach, the melodies associated with prayers at different Jewish holidays. As a teenager in the 1950s, Kessler played folk music on his guitar, but became interested in pursuing Jewish spiritual singing. He earned a master's degree in voice from Boston Conservatory and studied composition at Brandeis University, and graduated from the Miller Cantorial School of the Jewish Theological Seminary in 1970. He was influenced by the teachings of cantors David Kusevitzky and Max Wohlberg, as well as the recordings of Leib Glantz.

== Career ==
After graduating from cantorial school, Kessler served as a hazzan at Conservative congregations. He served for 12 years at Temple Beth Shalom in Framingham, Massachusetts before moving to Temple Beth Sholom in Smithtown, New York. In 1985, he moved to Philadelphia, where he served as hazzan at Germantown Jewish Centre and later Temple Sholom.

=== Atzilut ===
In 1991, Kessler organized an eight-member band called Atzilut to play Middle Eastern and Sephardic styles of Jewish music, even though he was trained in the Ashkenazic tradition. The band's name is drawn from Kabbalah, which describes four worlds or levels of spiritual energy, Atzilut being the highest. In 1993, members of Atzilut were having dinner at a restaurant where Arab musicians in the band Firkat Alamal: Band of Hope were performing. The two groups started playing together and realized they enjoyed making music with each other. In 1994, after the Hebron massacre, members of Atzilut and Firkat Alamal performed at a fundraising concert at the Painted Bride Art Center to raise money for Jewish-Arab reconciliation projects in Israel. Soon after this concert they combined into one band and continued playing together at venues such as the New York Folk Festival, the Copenhagen Opera House in Denmark, and the United Nations, where they received a standing ovation. Kessler has said that if Arabs and Jews can make music together they can live together in peace, noting that band members don't make speeches about coexistence and that the music is the message.

=== Other musical ensembles and cantorial training program ===
In addition to Atzilut, Kessler directed the Klezmer band Goldene Medina and the band Klingon Klezmer, which mixes Klezmer with jazz, funk and contemporary music. He also taught cantorial students and developed a cantorial training program for ALEPH, which he began building in 2000. He worked with Ashkenazi cantorial students, helping them understand their heritage while also exposing them to non-Ashkenazi music traditions.

=== Non-Hebrew leyning ===
During the early days of the havurah movement in the late 1960s, Rabbi Zalman Schachter-Shalomi and others began chanting prayers in English using the traditional nusach. This method made the liturgy feel authentic while making it more accessible to congregants. Some liberal congregations have adopted this approach for Torah readings, chanting (leyning) English translations with traditional trop. Kessler experienced this method as stunning, noting the text came alive with passion and power. He extended the use of the technique to chanting haftarah in Hebrew/English set in haftarah trop as well as Megillat Esther in Megillah trop. At a conference in Berlin, he chanted verses in Hebrew while Cantor Jalda Rebling chanted them in German.

== Selected publications ==
- Kessler, Jack A. (October 1973). "New Areas In Nusach: A Serial Approach To Hazzanut" (PDF). Journal of Synagogue Music. V (1). Cantors Assembly: 3–6.
- Kessler, Jack (July 1991). "A New Nusach for the Shalosh Regalim". Journal of Synagogue Music. XXI (1). Cantors Assembly: 60–68.
- Kessler, Jack (2014). "English Leyning: Bringing New Meaning to the Torah Service" (PDF). Kerem. 14: 21–29.
- Kessler, Hazzan Jack (2016) [1990]. "The Megillah Of Esther: An Original English Rendition Set To Trop" (2nd ed.).

== Personal life ==
Kessler lived with his wife Rabbi Marcia Prager in Philadelphia. Both are leaders in the Jewish Renewal movement and members of Congregation P'nai Or where Prager is the rabbi. They traveled together leading services and workshops at synagogues and conferences. Kessler died at the age of 79 on September 20, 2024.
