= Appreciative inquiry =

Organizational model

Appreciative inquiry (AI) is a model that seeks to engage stakeholders in self-determined change. According to organization development scholar Gervase Bushe, "AI revolutionized the field of organization development and was a precursor to the rise of positive organization studies and the strengths based movement in American management." It was developed at Case Western Reserve University's department of organizational behavior, starting with a 1987 article by David Cooperrider and Suresh Srivastva. They felt that the overuse of problem solving hampered any kind of social improvement, and what was needed were new methods of inquiry that would help generate new ideas and models for how to organize.

== History ==
Cooperrider and Srivastva took a social constructionist approach, arguing that organizations are created, maintained and changed by conversations, and claiming that methods of organizing were only limited by people's imaginations and the agreements among them.

In 2001, Cooperrider and Diana Whitney published an article outlining the five principles of AI.

In 1996, Cooperrider, Whitney and several of their colleagues became centrally involved using AI to mid-wife the creation of the United Religions Initiative, a global organization dedicated to promoting grassroots interfaith cooperation for peace, justice and healing. This early partnership between URI and AI is chronicled in Birth of a Global Community: Appreciative Inquiry in Action by Charles Gibbs and Sally Mahé. AI was also used in the first (1999) and subsequent meetings of business leaders that created the UN Global Compact. In another of the early applications, Cooperrider and Whitney taught AI to employees of GTE (now part of Verizon) resulting in improvements in employees' support for GTE's business direction and as a part of continuous process improvement generated both improvements in revenue collection and cost savings earning GTE an Association for Talent Development award for the best organizational change program in the US in 1997.

On May 8, 2010, Suresh Srivastva died.

Bushe published a 2011 review of the model, including its processes, critiques, and evidence. He also published a history of the model in 2012.

== Basis and principles ==
According to Bushe, AI "advocates collective inquiry into the best of what is, in order to imagine what could be, followed by collective design of a desired future state that is compelling and thus, does not require the use of incentives, coercion or persuasion for planned change to occur."

According to academic and professor at Lawrence Technological University Jacqueline Stavros, Appreciative Inquiry functions as a strengths-based approach to organizational change that emphasizes generative questions, collaborative dialogue, and the systematic exploration of what works well within organizations.

The model is based on the assumption that the questions we ask will tend to focus our attention in a particular direction, that organizations evolve in the direction of the questions they most persistently and passionately ask. In the mid-1980s most methods of assessing and evaluating a situation and then proposing solutions were based on a deficiency model, predominantly asking questions such as "What are the problems?", "What's wrong?" or "What needs to be fixed?". Instead of asking "What's the problem?", others couched the question in terms of "challenges", which still focused on deficiency, on what needs to be fixed or solved. Appreciative inquiry was the first serious managerial method to refocus attention on what works, the positive core, and on what people really care about. Today, these ways of approaching organizational change are common.

The five principles of AI are:

1. The constructionist principle proposes that what we believe to be true determines what we do, and thought and action emerge from relationships. Through the language and discourse of day to day interactions, people co-construct the organizations they inhabit. The purpose of inquiry is to stimulate new ideas, stories and images that generate new possibilities for action.
2. The principle of simultaneity proposes that as we inquire into human systems we change them and the seeds of change, the things people think and talk about, what they discover and learn, are implicit in the very first questions asked. Questions are never neutral, they are fateful, and social systems move in the direction of the questions they most persistently and passionately discuss.
3. The poetic principle proposes that organizational life is expressed in the stories people tell each other every day, and the story of the organization is constantly being co-authored. The words and topics chosen for inquiry have an impact far beyond just the words themselves. They invoke sentiments, understandings, and worlds of meaning. In all phases of the inquiry effort is put into using words that point to, enliven and inspire the best in people.
4. The anticipatory principle posits that what we do today is guided by our image of the future. Human systems are forever projecting ahead of themselves a horizon of expectation that brings the future powerfully into the present as a mobilizing agent. Appreciative inquiry uses artful creation of positive imagery on a collective basis to refashion anticipatory reality.
5. The positive principle proposes that momentum and sustainable change requires positive affect and social bonding. Sentiments like hope, excitement, inspiration, camaraderie and joy increase creativity, openness to new ideas and people, and cognitive flexibility. They also promote the strong connections and relationships between people, particularly between groups in conflict, required for collective inquiry and change.

Some researchers believe that excessive focus on dysfunctions can actually cause them to become worse or fail to become better. By contrast, AI argues, when all members of an organization are motivated to understand and value the most favorable features of its culture, it can make rapid improvements.

Strength-based methods are used in the creation of organizational development strategy and implementation of organizational effectiveness tactics. The appreciative mode of inquiry often relies on interviews to qualitatively understand the organization's potential strengths by looking at an organization's experience and its potential; the objective is to elucidate the assets and personal motivations that are its strengths.

Bushe has argued that mainstream proponents of AI focus too much attention on "the positive" and not enough on the transformation that AI can bring about through generating new ideas and the will to act on them. In a 2010 comparative study in a school district he found that even in cases where no change occurred participants were highly positive during the AI process. What distinguished those sites that experienced transformational changes was the creation of new ideas that gave people new ways to address old problems. He argues that for transformational change to occur, AI must address problems that concern people enough to want to change. However, AI addresses them not through problem-solving, but through generative images. Some of this is covered in a 90-minute discussion about AI, positivity and generativity by Bushe and Dr. Ron Fry of Case Western, at the 2012 World Appreciative Inquiry Conference.

== Distinguishing features ==
The following table comes from Cooperrider and Srivastva's (1987) original article and is used to describe some of the distinctions between AI and traditional approaches to organizational development:

Problem Solving	Appreciative inquiry
1. "Felt Need," identification of Problem	1. Appreciating & Valuing the Best of "What Is"
2. Analysis of Causes	2. Envisioning "What Might Be"
3. Analysis & Possible Solutions	3. Dialoguing "What Should Be"
4. Action Planning (Treatment)	4. Designing "What Will Be"
Basic Assumption: An Organization is a Problem to be Solved	Basic Assumption: An Organization is a Mystery to be Embraced

Appreciative inquiry attempts to use ways of asking questions and envisioning the future in order to foster positive relationships and build on the present potential of a given person, organization, or situation. The most common model, called the 4D model describes a sequence of four processes. Many have pointed out, however, that there is an initial process of DEFINE, identifying what sponsors of the inquiry want more of - what they are trying to improve or bring into existence. From that point, Appreciative Inquiry emphasizes bringing as many stakeholders, particularly those who will need to change for any change to happen, into 2-4 day meetings that follow this sequence:

1. DISCOVER: Exploring the personal story each participant has of the desired outcome as its best/most meaningful/most inspiring (e.g., exceptional customer service). Learnings from those stories are shared.
2. DREAM: Voicing the deepest, most meaningful aspirations each person holds and weaving them loosely together. Often using play and art to engage the less rational, more personal parts of people.
3. DESIGN: Small groups self-organize around problems, outcomes, or solutions they want to work on. Prototyping is common. Time to work with feedback from others is common.
4. DESTINY (or DEPLOY): There are two ways this is managed. In the hi-engagement approach, proposals are given to leaders to manage. Some time may be spent at the Summit giving leaders advice on how to proceed. In the generative approach, people are encouraged to take action on their ideas without waiting for permission. The generative approach is far more transformational.

The aim of most AI practitioners is to create aligned, committed action in organizations and communities by identifying what we collectively want and planning how to get it. AI originally described this approach as the opposite of problem-solving. Later thinking identified "generativity" as the differentiator. Generativity is the creation of new ideas that people want to act on, and appreciative inquiry creates more generative conversations. People use appreciative inquiry to solve problems, but they do it through generativity, not problem-solving.

== Implementing AI ==
There are a variety of approaches to implementing appreciative inquiry, including mass-mobilised interviews and a large, diverse gathering called an Appreciative Inquiry Summit. These approaches involve bringing large, diverse groups of people together to study and build upon the best in an organization or community.

== Uses ==
In Vancouver, AI is used by the Dalai Lama Center for Peace and Education. The center, which was founded by the Dalai Lama and Victor Chan, uses AI to facilitate compassionate communities.

== See also ==
- Geoffrey Vickers introduced concept of 'Appreciative Systems' (1968)
- Kenneth J. Gergen instrumental in social constructionism and the concept of generativity
- David Cooperrider originated the theory of appreciative inquiry in his 1986 doctoral dissertation.
- Organization development
- Social constructionism
- Complexity theory and organizations
- Appreciative inquiry in education
