= DeSmog =

Organization focused on climate topics

- Available in: English
- Website: www.desmog.com
- Launched: January 2006
- Current status: Active

DeSmog (formerly The DeSmogBlog) is an international journalism organization that focuses on topics related to climate change. Founded in January 2006, DeSmog's emphasis is investigating and reporting on misinformation campaigns and organizations opposing climate science and action. The site was founded, originally in blog format, by James Hoggan, president of a public relations firm based in Vancouver, British Columbia, Canada. DeSmog is a partner in the Covering Climate Now project which organizes and assists news organizations cover climate change worldwide. DeSmog also maintains several databases of persons and organizations engaged in misinformation and lobbying against addressing climate change.

== Content ==
=== Mission and audience ===
The blog was co-founded in January 2006 by James Hoggan, president of the public relations firm Hoggan and Associates. In a February 2007 interview with the Vancouver Sun, Hoggan conveyed his anger at industry interests who he believed mislead the public about the scientific understanding of global warming. He referred to this alleged misrepresentation of the facts as, "public relations at its sleaziest". Hoggan used his public relations skills to start a blog that would "clear the PR pollution that clouds the science of climate change" and expose organizations and individuals which he considered to be unethical. DeSmog says it reports on the credibility of experts who appear to misrepresent the science of global warming in the media by investigating their scientific background, funding sources, and industry interests. The site originally targeted a Canadian audience but is now involved in global climate change coverage.

Contributors to the site assist in researching organizations that the site's staff believe are phony grassroots organizations, or astroturf groups, sponsored directly or indirectly by industries seeking to thwart climate change-related legislation. Organizations alleged by the blog to be astroturfs include Friends of Science, Natural Resources Stewardship Project, Global Climate Coalition, and International Climate Science Coalition. Individuals that the site has identified as pushing an anti-climate change point of view are listed in the site's "Denial Database", with accompanying information about their industry affiliations and professional biographies. In a Financial Post column, Canadian environmentalist Lawrence Solomon stated that the organization was, in Solomon's words, "specifically created for the purpose of discrediting skeptics".

In a 2007 report in The Globe and Mail, Hoggan stated that the most frequent visitors to the site came from Calgary, Ottawa, and Washington D.C.

=== Heartland Institute documents ===
In February 2012, DeSmog posted a number of internal documents purportedly from The Heartland Institute, a libertarian think tank. According to a statement posted on the Heartland Institute website, "Some of these documents were stolen from Heartland, at least one is a fake, and some may have been altered ... the authenticity of those documents has not been confirmed." On February 20, 2012, Peter Gleick issued a statement in the Huffington Post explaining that he had received an anonymous document in the mail that seemed to contain details on the climate program strategy of the Heartland Institute. He admitted to soliciting and receiving additional material from the institute "under someone else's name", calling his actions "a serious lapse of my own and professional judgment and ethics". Gleick maintains that the documents are real, not fake, contrary to what Heartland continues to claim. A separate, independent investigation by the Pacific Institute found no evidence of any forgery. According to The Guardian, Gleick "impersonated a Heartland board member to obtain and make public confidential budget and strategy documents...The Pacific Institute indicated...that it had found no evidence for Heartland's charges that Gleick had forged one of several documents he released last February."

== Founder and staff ==
The site's co-founder, James Hoggan, is president of the Vancouver-based public relations firm James Hoggan & Associates, chair of the David Suzuki Foundation, a trustee of the Dalai Lama Center for Peace and Education, and an executive member of the Urban Development Institute. He is the author (with Richard Littlemore) of the 2009 book Climate Cover-Up: The Crusade to Deny Global Warming (ISBN 978-1-55365-485-8), which criticizes global warming denial and conspiracy theories. The sources do not identify the site's other co-founder.

The website names John Lefebvre as a benefactor.

Frequent early writers for the blog included Ross Gelbspan and Richard Littlemore, a science writer formerly of the Vancouver Sun. The site's project manager was Kevin Grandia, who left to become the Director of Online Strategy at Greenpeace. As of 2022 the site lists a staff of eleven, with executive director Brendan DeMelle.

== Awards ==
The site was recognized in December 2007 by three British Columbia chapters of the Canadian Public Relations Society, the Vancouver, Victoria (CPRS-vi) and Northern Lights in Prince George, with an award for demonstrating "The highest ethical and professional standards while performing outstanding work". In a CPRS press release which accompanied the award, Hoggan stated that the site had been viewed by 520,000 people over its history, had been cited as a source by 24 media outlets, and mentioned in more than 4,500 other blogs. According to the press release, the blog was selected for the award by a panel of journalists and public relations professionals in Victoria, Vancouver, and Prince George.

DeSmog was also listed by Time magazine as one of the "best blogs of 2011" in June 2011.

== See also ==
- Climate change denial
- Global warming controversy
- RealClimate
- Skeptical Science
- Watts Up With That
