= Eva Collins (academic) =

American-New Zealand professor in management

Academic background
- Education: George Washington University
- Thesis: A multi-stakeholder evaluation of the U.S. Environmental Protection Agency's 33/50, Climate Wise and Project XL voluntary environmental programs (2002)

Eva Marie Collins is an American–New Zealand academic, and is a full professor at the University of Waikato, specialising in business sustainability and the circular economy.

== Academic career ==
Collins completed a Bachelor degree with honours at Portland State University, followed by a Master of Arts degree at Essex University in the UK. She then completed a PhD titled A multi-stakeholder evaluation of the U.S. Environmental Protection Agency's 33/50, Climate Wise and Project XL voluntary environmental programs at George Washington University in 2002. Collins spent ten years working as a lobbyist for United Technologies Corporation. Collins joined the faculty of the University of Waikato in 2002, rising to full professor in 2022. Collins is the Sustainability Coordinator for the Waikato Management School, and co-chairs the university's Sustainability Committee. She is a lifetime member of Clare Hall, at Cambridge University.

Collins is interested in management and sustainability, and researches areas such as environmental entrepreneurship, the circular economy, and the relationship business has with sustainability. Collins says that greater transparency requirements means that New Zealand exporters can no longer ignore the need to engage in sustainability or carbon emission reporting, for instance. She is part of an MBIE-funded collaboration with Sara Walton, Gradon Diprose and Alison Greenaway to explore the understanding and use of the term 'circular economy' in New Zealand, and make recommendations about how to improve collaboration towards a circular economy.

== Selected works ==
- S. R. Lawrence; E. Collins; K. Pavlovich; M. Arunachalam (2006). "Sustainability practices of SMEs: the case of NZ". Business Strategy and the Environment. 15 (4): 242–257. doi:10.1002/bse.533. Wikidata Q125036610.
- Eva Collins; Stewart Lawrence; Kathryn Pavlovich; Chris Ryan (2007). "Business networks and the uptake of sustainability practices: the case of New Zealand". Journal of Cleaner Production. 15 (8–9): 729–740. doi:10.1016/j.jclepro.2006.06.020. Wikidata Q104893862.
- Eva Collins; Juliet Roper; Stewart Lawrence (2010). "Sustainability practices: trends in New Zealand businesses". Business Strategy and the Environment. 19 (8): 479–494. doi:10.1002/bse.653. Wikidata Q125036579.
- Kathryn Pavlovich; Eva Collins; Glyndwr Jones (2008). "Developing Students' Skills in Reflective Practice". Journal of Management Education. 33 (1): 37–58. doi:10.1177/1052562907307640. Wikidata Q125036583.
- Kate Kearins; Eva Collins; Helen Tregidga (2010). "Beyond Corporate Environmental Management to a Consideration of Nature in Visionary Small Enterprise". Business & Society. 49 (3): 512–547. doi:10.1177/0007650310368988. Wikidata Q125036567.
- Kate Kearins; Eva Collins (2011). "Making Sense of Ecopreneurs' Decisions to Sell Up". Business Strategy and the Environment. 21 (2): 71–85. doi:10.1002/bse.710. Wikidata Q125036558.
- EVA MARIE COLLINS; KATE KEARINS (2010). "Delivering on Sustainability's Global and Local Orientation". Academy of Management Learning and Education. 9 (3): 499–506. doi:10.5465/amle.2010.53791830. Wikidata Q125036561.
