= Sustainable Cleveland =

Sustainable Cleveland or SustainableCLE (formerly known as Sustainable Cleveland 2019) is a program developed by the Mayor's Office of Sustainability located in the City of Cleveland, Ohio in the United States. Sustainable Cleveland is the City's public-facing brand for its climate action and sustainability goals. The program was established in 2009 under then Mayor Frank G. Jackson in 2009, aiming to engage residents, businesses, and encourage sustainability throughout the city and Northeast Ohio region. From 2009 - 2019, each year focused on a specific theme.

Twenty-five people were appointed to the program council by Jackson. Andrew Watterson was named, by Jackson, Cleveland's Chief of Sustainability and the head of Sustainable Cleveland in 2009. Jenita McGowan replaced Watterson in 2012.

The 2012 initiative focused on improving the amount of local food produced, sold to the public, and used by restaurants. Sustainable Cleveland holds an annual summit, focused on year-specific initiatives including local food growth and renewable energy. Jeremy Rifkin, David Cooperrider, and Kathleen Merrigan have spoken at the summit.

Yearly Themes

- 2013 - Renewable Energy
- 2014 – Waste
- 2015 – Clean Water
- 2016 – Transportation
- 2017 – Green Space
- 2018 – Neighborhoods
- 2019 - People

Sustainable Cleveland is also driven by working groups, which form from annual summits.
