= Gerald Cohen (composer) =

American composer and cantor

- Born: Gerald Cohen; 1960 (age 65–66); New York, New York
- Genres: Opera, Choral Music, Orchestra music
- Occupations: Composer, pianist, cantor
- Instruments: Piano, Vocals
- Years active: 1982–present

Gerald Cohen (born 1960 in New York, NY) is an American composer and cantor. He is currently the cantor at Shaarei Tikvah in Scarsdale, New York and is based in Yonkers. Cohen serves on the faculties of Jewish Theological Seminary and Hebrew Union College. Cohen's compositions are published by Oxford University Press, G. Schirmer/AMP, and Transcontinental Music Publications.

== Biography ==
Cohen earned a B.A. in music from Yale University in 1982. Shortly afterwards, he began working as a cantor while attending Columbia University where he received a Doctor of Musical Arts degree (D.M.A.) in composition, with distinction, in 1993. His principal composition teachers were Jack Beeson, Mario Davidovsky, George Edwards, and Andrew Thomas. Jacob Mendelson was Cohen's primary cantorial studies teacher. Cohen's music has been commissioned by chamber ensembles including: the Cassatt String Quartet, Verdehr Trio, Franciscan String Quartet, Chesapeake Chamber Music, Grneta Ensemble, Wave Hill Trio, Bronx Arts Ensemble, and Brooklyn Philharmonic Brass Quintet; by choruses including the New York Virtuoso Singers, Canticum Novum Singers, Syracuse Children's Chorus, St. Bartholomew's Church in New York City, Zamir Chorale of Boston, Usdan Center Chorus, the Cantors Assembly of America, HaZamir: The International Jewish High School Choir, and the Westchester Youth Symphony. Battery Dance Company commissioned his Songs of Tagore which accompanied dance performances on tours throughout India and Eastern Europe.

Cohen's music has been performed by the Borromeo String Quartet, Pittsburgh Symphony Orchestra, San Diego Symphony, Westchester Philharmonic, Riverside Symphony, Plymouth Music Series Orchestra, New York Concert Singers, Princeton Pro Musica, and many other ensembles and soloists.

== Music and style ==
Cohen's music reflects his embracing of both Western classical traditions and his Jewish roots. Ken Smith, writing for Gramaphone, says of Cohen's style:

Cohen composes with a strong sense of tradition -- one that embraces Brahms, Bartok and Britten on one hand and his own Jewish heritage on the other. Which side becomes more prominent depends, it seems, on how deeply any particular piece is rooted to text. A cantor himself, Cohen's songs and his Passover Cantata V'higad'ta L'vincha display a linguistic fluidity and a melodic gift that hints at what the Hebrew liturgy might be like today if Britten had changed faiths. Once away from the language, however, the Jewish roots recede into a broader modernist context. His String Quartet No. 2, likewise, uses traditional structures, namely sonata form in the outer movements encasing a slow and lyrical elegy to his late father. The composer's self-described synthesis of art, religion and family in this piece reveals a very personal modernism that makes for more difficult listening -- imagine Bartok spiked with Hebraic modal and metric shifts -- but offers greater emotional rewards as well.

Cohen cites both his experience as a cantor and the western classical tradition (Beethoven, Mahler, and Copland) as equal influences. In a 2002 interview for New Music Box, he said, "in a way what I'm trying to do is have that all come together, perhaps not completely consciously, but just that those are also different sides of me which I want to project into whatever I'm writing."

Cohen's best known work is a "shimmering setting" of Psalm 43.

He is the composer of three operatic works: the 2013 opera Steal a Pencil for Me, based on a true story of love in a WWII concentration camp, which Lucid culture described as "…mesmerizingly hypnotic, intricately contrapuntal" music, with moments of "…Bernard Herrmann-esque, shivery terror…". His opera Sarah and Hagar (2008), based on the story from the book of Genesis, and Seed (2011), a one-act opera about love and choices for a post-apocalyptic couple, have been performed in concert form.

== Recordings ==
Title	Year	Label	Catalog No.	Notes
Sea of Reeds: Chamber Music of Gerald Cohen	2014	Parma		Contains Variously Blue, Sea of Reeds, Yedid Nefesh, and Grneta Variations
Gerald Cohen: Generations	2007	New World Records	NWCR879	Contains Trio for viola, cello and piano; Four Songs on Hebrew Texts; String Quartet No. 2; and V'higad'ta L'vincha (And You Shall Tell Your Child)

== List of works ==
Opera

- 2008 Sarah and Hagar, Opera in two acts, libretto by Charles Kondek - 135’
- 2011 Seed, Opera in one act, libretto by David Simpatico - 40’
- 2013 Steal a Pencil for Me, Opera in two acts, libretto by Deborah Brevoort - 140’

Instrumental Chamber Music

- 1988 Trio for violin, cello and piano - 16’
- 1991 String Quartet #2 – 25′
- 1994 Aria and Scherzo for violin and viola - 12′
- 1995 Songs of Tagore, for chamber ensemble(music for choreography) – 22′
- 1995 Quintet for Brass - 16′
- 1999 Trio for viola, cello and piano - 20’
- 2001 Preludes and Debka, for trombone and string quartet - 13’
- 2007 Yedid Nefesh: Trio for clarinet, viola and piano - 26’
- 2009 Variously Blue: Trio for clarinet, violin and piano - 14’
- 2009 Sea of Reeds: Five Hebrew songs for two clarinets and piano - 15′
- 2009 Preludes and Debka, for clarinet and string quartet - 13’
- 2010 Grneta Variations, for two clarinets and piano- 14’
- 2010 Three Hebrew Songs, for violin and piano – 12′
- 2012 Playing for our lives, for string quartet - 23’

Orchestral Music (including works with voice)

- 1994 Elegy for String Orchestra - 8’
- 1997 O you who linger in the gardens…, for symphony orchestra - 10′
- Y’varech’cha (Blessing for children)

2000 Arrangement for treble voices and orchestra
2006 Arrangement for voice and string orchestra

- Adonai Ro’i Lo Echsar (Psalm 23)

2000 Arrangement for voice and orchestra
2002 Arrangement for chorus and orchestra
2006 Arrangement for voice and string orchestra

- 2009 Preludes and Debka, for trombone and orchestra - 13′

Choral Music

- 1983 Libavtini Achoti Chala, for solo voice, SATB chorus and piano - 3’
- 1987 Lo Lanu (Psalm 115), for SATB chorus and piano - 8’
- 1996 Hinei Ma Tov/Shaalu Sh’lom Y’rushalayim, for solo voice and SATB chorus - 3’
- 1996 V’higad’ta L’vincha (And You Shall Tell Your Child), for children's chorus (SSA), clarinet, cello and piano - 16′

1999 Arrangement for SATB chorus, clarinet, cello and piano

- 1998 Y’varech’cha (Blessing for children) For treble voices (2 part) and piano

2000 Arrangement for treble voices (2 part) and orchestra

- 1999 Adonai Ro’i Lo Echsar (Psalm 23) for SATB chorus and piano - 3'

2013 Version for SSA chorus and piano
2002 Version for SATB chorus and orchestra
1992 Version for unison chorus and piano

- 2001 Ki Heim Chayeinu (a setting of the weekday evening service, for cantor, chorus, clarinet and piano) - 20’
- 2001 Sim Shalom, for SATB Chorus and piano - 5’
- 2002 Sing Our Song, for SATB chorus and piano (text by Elie Wiesel) — 5’
- 2002 Our birth is but a sleep and a forgetting, for children's and SATB chorus, and organ — 5’
- 2003 L’chu N’ran’na (Psalm 95), for SATB chorus and organ - 4’
- 2003 All of God’s creations recite melody, for SATB chorus and organ - 5’
- 2003 An Undaunted Heart: Songs of Elders, for SATB chorus and piano - 17’
- 2003 Adon Olam (Eternal Lord), for SATB chorus and organ -
- 2004 Lakol z’man/To everything a season, for SATB chorus and piano - 5’
- 2005 Meditation and Celebration (Psalms 33 and 100), for SATB chorus and piano - 6’
- 2006 Lo, body and soul—this land, for SSA chorus and piano (poem by Walt Whitman) - 5’
- 2007 Lakol z’man #2, for soprano + baritone solo, unison chorus and piano - 5’
- 2008 Yihyu l’ratson (May the words), for solo voice, SATB chorus, viola and piano - 4’
- 2008 Dodi li vaani lo (My beloved is mine, and I am his), for SATB chorus, clarinet and piano - 3’
- 2011 We are loved by an unending love, for mezzo solo, SATB chorus and piano - 4’
- 2013 Uvtuvo m’chadesh (In Your goodness, You renew), for SATB chorus, viola and piano – 6′
- 2015 "L'dor Vador" (From generation to generation), for SATB chorus and piano

'Solo Vocal Music

- 1984 Five Songs of Stevie Smith, for mezzo-soprano and piano - 17’
- 1992 Adonai Ro’i Lo Echsar (Psalm 23) for solo voice or unison chorus and piano – 3′
- 1994 Grandparents, song cycle for medium voice and piano (poems by Marc Kaminsky) - 17′
- 1999 Come Before God with Joyous Song (Bo’u L’fanav Birnana) – 20’
- 2001 The Dogwoods (Four songs on Poems of Linda Pastan), for soprano and piano - 13’
- 2001 Ki Heim Chayeinu (a setting of the weekday evening service, for cantor, chorus, clarinet and piano) – 20’
- 2004 Kaddish, for voice, clarinet and piano - 5’
- 2007 Lakol z’man #2, for soprano + baritone solo, unison chorus and piano - 5’

Works for Synagogue

LIFE CYCLE
- 1983 Libavtini Achoti Chala, for solo voice, SATB chorus and piano
- 1992 Adonai Ro’i Lo Echsar (Psalm 23) for solo voice or unison chorus and piano - 3′

2000 Arrangement for voice and orchestra (2000)

- 1998 Y’varech’cha (Blessing for children), for treble voices (2 part) and piano

2000 Arrangement for treble voices (2 part) and orchestra
2010 Arrangement for solo voice and string quartet

- 1999 Adonai Ro’i Lo Echsar (Psalm 23) for SATB chorus and piano - 3′

1992 Version for unison chorus and piano
2002 Version for SATB chorus and orchestra
2013 Version for SSA chorus and piano

- 2004 Kaddish, for voice, clarinet and piano (poem by Marge Piercy) - 5’

COMPLETE SERVICES
- 2001 Ki Heim Chayeinu (a setting of the weekday evening service, for cantor, chorus, clarinet and piano) - 20’

HOLIDAYS
- 1996 V’higad’ta L’vincha (And You Shall Tell Your Child), for children’s chorus (SSA), clarinet, cello and piano - 16′

1999 Arrangement for SATB chorus, clarinet, cello and piano

SETTINGS OF HEBREW/LITURGICAL TEXTS:
- 1987 Lo Lanu (Psalm 115), for SATB chorus and piano - 8’
- 1996 Hinei Ma Tov/Shaalu Sh’lom Y’rushalayim, for solo voice and SATB chorus - 3’
- 1999 Come Before God with Joyous Song - 20’
- 2001 Sim Shalom, for SATB Chorus and piano - 5’
- 2003 L’chu N’ran’na (Psalm 95), for SATB chorus and organ — 4’
- 2003 Adon Olam (Eternal Lord), for SATB chorus and organ - 5’
- 2004 Lakol z’man/To everything a season, for SATB chorus and piano - 5’
- 2005 Meditation and Celebration, (Psalms 33 and 100), for SATB chorus and piano - 6’
- 2007 Lakol z’man #2, for soprano + baritone solo, unison chorus and piano - 5’
- 2008 Yihyu l’ratson (May the words), for solo voice, SATB chorus, viola and piano - 4’

== Selected awards and commissions ==
Awards

- Copland House Borromeo String Quartet Award (2008)
- Aaron Copland Award (2007)
- Westchester Prize for New Work (2001)
- American Composers Forum Faith Partners residency (2001-2002)
- Cantors Assembly's Max Wohlberg Award for distinguished achievement in the field of Jewish composition (2003)
- Yale University's Sudler Prize for outstanding achievement in the creative arts

Commissioning grants received

- Meet the Composer/ National Endowment for the Arts
- New York State Council on the Arts
- Westchester Arts Council

Residencies

- The MacDowell Colony
- Yaddo
- Virginia Center for the Creative Arts
- American Lyric Theater
