= James Hoggan =

James Hoggan may refer to:

- James Hoggan (athlete)
- James Hoggan (public relations expert)
