= Delbecq =

Delbecq is a surname. Notable people with the surname include:

- Andre Delbecq (1936–2016), American academic
- Benoît Delbecq (born 1966), French pianist and composer
