= John Lefebvre =

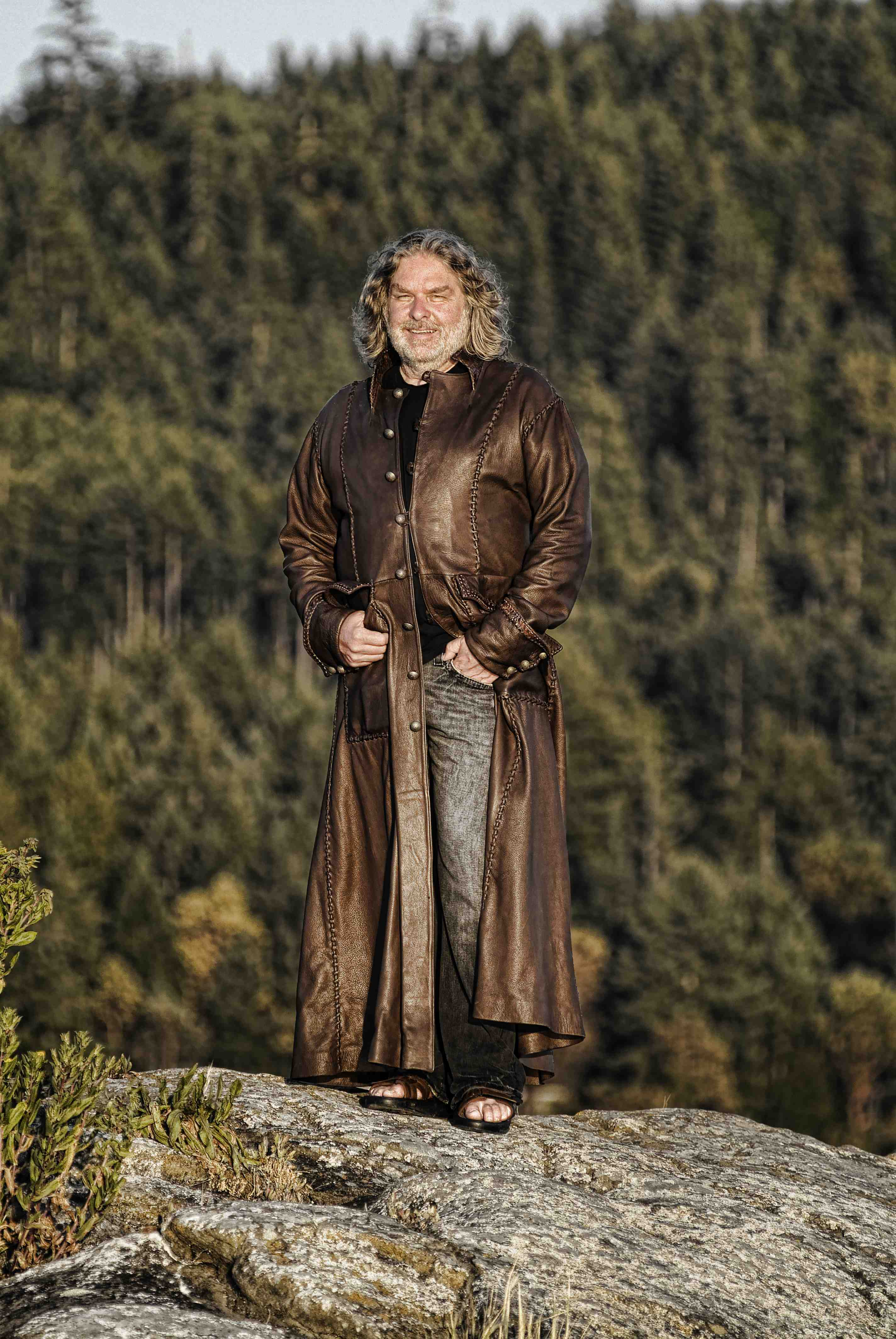

Background information
- Born: August 6, 1951 (age 73)
- Origin: Calgary, Alberta, Canada
- Occupation(s): Singer-songwriter, entrepreneur, lawyer
- Instrument(s): Vocals, acoustic guitar, electric guitar, piano, keyboards
- Years active: 2008–present
- Website: www.johnlefebvre.com

John Lefebvre (born August 6, 1951), is a Canadian musician, composer, entrepreneur, retired lawyer and philanthropist. He is currently active as an author and activist on climate change issues. In 2017 Lefebvre published his first book, All's Well - Where Thou Art Earth And Why, a work of political, moral and legal philosophy.

== Neteller platform and imprisonment ==
Lefebvre first garnered public attention in 1999, when he was involved with Neteller (now known as Paysafe), an online money transfer facility. The firm's involvement in transactions serving the online gambling industry led to U.S. charges of money laundering, racketeering, running an unlicensed money transmitting business and promoting illegal gambling. He was arrested in January 2007 and pleaded guilty to charges of conspiracy to promote illegal Internet gambling transactions. He agreed to cooperate with prosecutors, and the court ordered his company to forfeit $140 million.

Lefebvre and his founding partner forfeited $100 million personally between them. He ultimately served 45 days in federal prison in the Southern District of Manhattan.

== Music career ==
In 2007, Lefebvre composed and recorded a double CD album entitled Psalngs with the help of the record producer Brian Ahern. This was John's first effort as a solo artist. Ahern gathered a skookum studio band for the album, which included Jim Keltner, Hutch Hutchinson, Greg Leisz, Patrick Warren, Dean Parks, Al Kooper, Matt Rollings and Mac McAnally. The players regrouped with Lefebvre and Ahern in the spring of 2010 to record Lefebvre's second solo effort, The Initial Album, released in 2010.

== News analysis and political activism ==
Lefebvre and James Hoggan are co-founders of the DeSmogBlog.com group of blogs, which focus on topics related to global warming. The site's self-described purpose is to expose "global warming misinformation campaigns." Lefebvre is among the blog's most active commentators, in addition to substantial writing in other forums including social media.

== Philanthropy ==
From July 2009 to July 2011 Lefebvre served as a director of the David Suzuki Foundation. At that time both Suzuki and Lefebvre resigned from the board of DSF to found the David Suzuki Institute (DSI), which is not a tax deductible charitable organization, and thus is more free to express political opinions. He is also a continuing supporter of the Dalai Lama Center for Peace and Education, a Vancouver-based institution focused upon the teachings of Dalai Lama and "education of the heart."
