= Victor Chan =

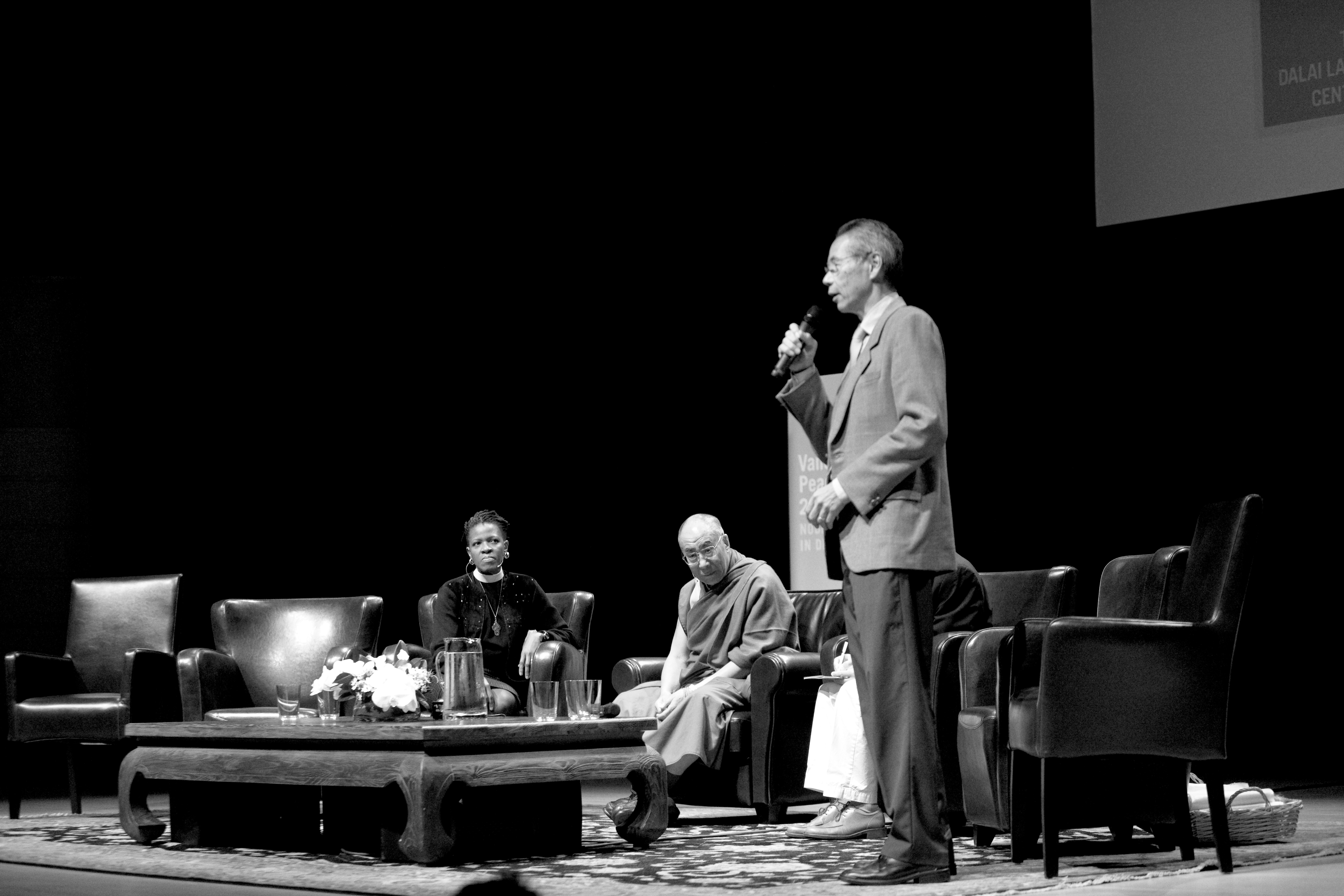
- Born: 1945 (age 80–81); Hong Kong
- Citizenship: Canadian
- Spouse: Suzanne Martin
- Writing career
- Language: English
- Genres: Essay, guide book
- Notable work: The Wisdom of Forgiveness
- Website: dalailamacenter.org/users/victor-chan

Victor Chan (born 1945) is a Hong-Kong-born Canadian writer and physicist. Founder of the Dalai Lama Center for Peace and Education, Chan has known the 14th Dalai Lama since 1972. Co-author with him of two essays, he also wrote a guide of pilgrimage to Tibet. He lives in Vancouver in British Columbia, Canada.

== Biography ==
Victor Chan was born in 1945 in Hong Kong which he left at the age of 20 years. He continued his education in Canada and the United States. He performed his graduate studies at the Enrico Fermi Institute of the University of Chicago in the field of particle physics.

In 1971, after his studies, Chan traveled to Europe in a van. His route took him to the Netherlands to Turkey, and then through Iran and Afghanistan. During the travel, he was joined by two women, Cheryl Crosby, an American, and Rita, a German. In Kabul, they were taken in hostage until the vehicle of hijackers crashed, allowing them to escape. Cheryl Crosby, a New York Buddhist practitioner, proposed Chan to go to Dharamshala in India, where they arrived in March 1972. Cheryl had a letter of introduction to meet the Dalai Lama to discuss meditation. After answering her questions, the Dalai Lama turned to Victor Chan. Chan asked him if he hated the Chinese. He unhesitatingly replied negatively, explaining that he had forgiven the Chinese and did not blame the Chinese people. Victor Chan became a close friend of the Dalai Lama.

Between 1984 and 1988, he lived 4 years in Nepal, using Kathmandu as a base to travel to Tibet. In 1984, Chan made his first visit there, traveling 42,000 kilometers by foot, horse, yak, coracle, truck and bus. He returned in 1990 and traveled some of the main paths of sacred Tibetan pilgrimage, including Kailash, Tsari and Lapchi, the 3 most sacred mountains. He then left Tibet and began to write. After 5 years of research in Europe, he published his guide to Tibet in 1994, a book he presented to the Dalai Lama in London the same year, 22 years after their last meeting. Professor Michael Aris wrote that this is the most detailed and comprehensive guide to Tibet, a landmark work of a worthy successor of the great explorers of the nineteenth century.

In 1999, Victor Chan asked the Dalai Lama if he could collaborate on a book.

For this book, The Wisdom of Forgiveness, originally published in English in 2004, and translated into 14 languages. Victor Chan has recorded hundreds of hours in the company of the Dalai Lama, following him in his travels around the world for conferences and Buddhist ceremonies, and realized dozens of daily interviews at his residence in Dharamsala, India, observing, discussing with him and witnessing private audiences granted to personalities. When the Dalai Lama was asked why he allowed Chan to follow his life so closely, he explained: "His parents are Chinese. He grew up in Western atmosphere, but he is Chinese. I always believe in understanding. The Chinese living in America, it is very, very important to have one single Chinese, to have close contact, and a better understanding of Tibetans. Whenever they find opportunities to meet Chinese brothers and sisters showing interest in me and Tibet, to tell them the truth. I'm very happy. Secondly, (Victor) came to Dharamsala several meetings, on a few occasions he showed very strong emotions, so that means he's very sincere, not artificial, not cheating. Heart sincerity, that's important". From the book, the two men are good friends.

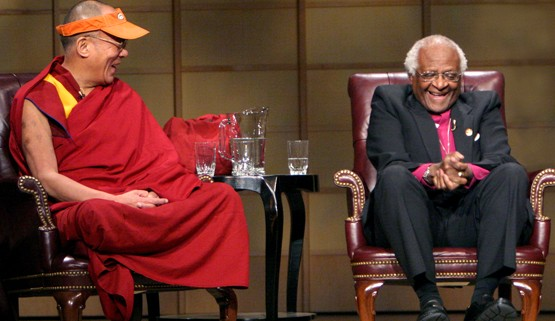
14th Dalai Lama and Desmond Tutu at the Chan Centre for the Performing Arts, Vancouver in 2004

With Pitman B. Potter, director of the Institute of Asian Research at the University of British Columbia, Victor Chan organized a symposium from 17 to 20 April 2004, at the Chan Centre for the Performing Arts Vancouver on the theme of peace and reconciliation. He invited the Dalai Lama to Canada where his last visit had 10 years previously. Two other Nobel laureates, Desmond Tutu, a longtime friend of the Dalai Lama, and Shirin Ebadi, gave each a conference. Václav Havel, another longtime friend of the Dalai Lama initially invited, canceled his visit at the last minute due to medical reason. Paul Ekman, who attended the event in the public reports that Dr. Jo-Ann Archibald, Indian North America, and Rabbi Zalman Schachter-Shalomi also pronounced a speech. Canadian Anglican Bishop Michael Ingham was moderator of the discussion that closed the conference. Pico Iyer, who attended the conference as a journalist, wrote a detailed account of it in his book The Open Road: The Global Journey of the Fourteenth Dalai Lama.

With Pitman B. Potter, Victor Chan founded a Tibetan studies program.,

Apart from the Dalai Lama to Vancouver three times in 2004, 2006, and 2009, he also invited celebrities such as Desmond Tutu, Matthieu Ricard, Mia Farrow, Jane Goodall, Peter Buffett, Daniel Goleman, Daniel J. Siegel, Ela Bhatt, Shirin Ebadi, Karen Armstrong, Stephen Covey, Kim Campbell, le Blue Man Group, Maria Shriver, Michaelle Jean, Ken Robinson, Murray Gell-Mann, Mary Robinson, Jody Williams, Mairead Maguire, Robert Putnam, Reginald Ray and Bob Geldof Victor Chan founded the Dalai Lama Center for Peace and Education in Vancouver in 2005. Chan's efforts led to the creation of an institution that, according to Douglas Todd has become a force field for global change - with a particular focus on education reform, global philanthropy and promoting women's rights.

In 2013 he published with the Dalai Lama The Wisdom of Compassion, which addresses, in particular, the scientific study of meditation on compassion. For Craig Kielburger and Marc Kielburger, the center of Victor Chan plays a key role in enabling the Vancouver School Board to be at the forefront of teaching on compassion and social responsibility Education in Canada. Victor Chan married East German landscape designer Suzanne Martin around 1994 with whom he had two daughters, Kira and Lina.,

Victor Chan is a member of the Advisory Board of the American NGO International Campaign for Tibet.

== Publications ==
=== Books ===
- 2013 : with the 14th Dalai Lama, The Wisdom of Compassion: Stories of Remarkable Encounters and Timeless Insights, Riverhead, ISBN 978-1-59448-738-5
- The Wisdom of Forgiveness: Intimate Conversations and Journeys New York: Riverhead Books, 2004 ISBN 1573222771
- Tibet Handbook: A Pilgrimage Guide, Moon Travel Handbooks, 1994, ISBN 0918373905

=== Articles and book chapters ===
- A Tale of Two Chinese Cities, in Exile as Challenge: The Tibetan Diaspora, Dagmar Bernstorff, Hubertus von Welck, Orient Blackswan, 2003, ISBN 8125025553, pp. 101–106.
- Appendix (Buddhism in British Columbia) in Buddhism in Canada, Bruce Matthews, Psychology Press, 2006, ISBN 0203390881, pp. 24–26.
- At Home With the Dalai Lama, Septembre 2013, Shambhala Sun.
