= Lynn Gottlieb =

American rabbi

Lynn Gottlieb (born April 12, 1949 in Bethlehem, Pennsylvania) is an American rabbi in the Jewish Renewal movement and one of the first ten women to become an ordained rabbi in Jewish history.

== Early life and education ==
Gottlieb is the daughter of Abraham and Harriet Gottlieb and grew up in the Reform community of Allentown, Pennsylvania. Her father was a businessman; her mother was a puppeteer and founder of the Little Civic Theater. The Reform movement was not yet offering Bat Mitzvahs to girls, but she participated in a Reform confirmation ceremony as a tenth grade student, where, she said, her rabbi told her that she could be a rabbi someday.

As a high school student, Gottlieb went to Israel as an exchange student and studied at the Leo Baeck Education Center in Haifa. This experience cemented her desire to be a rabbi, which was not yet a path available to women. She studied at SUNY Albany and received a B.S. from Hebrew University of Jerusalem in 1972, after which she studied at Hebrew Union College and the Jewish Theological Seminary of America. In addition, she was a student of Daniel Boyarin and Yitz Greenberg.

In 1981, she became the first woman ordained as a rabbi in the Jewish Renewal movement; she was ordained by rabbis Zalman Schachter, Everett Gendler, and Shlomo Carlebach.

== Rabbinic and artistic career ==
Gottlieb became the spiritual leader of Temple Beth Or of the Deaf and Hebrew Association of the Deaf in 1973, at the age of 23, while a student at JTS. In 1975, she founded an experimental synagogue, Mishkan A Shul, in New York City.

In 1974, Gottlieb founded the now-defunct Jewish feminist theater troupe Bat Kol, which explored feminist Midrash.

In 1981, Gottlieb co-founded Congregation Nahalat Shalom in Albuquerque, New Mexico, which she led until becoming Rabbi Emerita in 2006.

In the 1990s, Gottlieb played an important role in bringing to light Carlebach's long history of sexual assault and sexual violence, In 1997, she gave a lecture at Jewish Renewal community Congregation Chochmat HaLev in Berkeley, California, where she described Carlebach's molestation of one of her congregants.

From 2007 to 2009, Gottlieb was co-director of the Middle East Program at the San Francisco office of the American Friends Service Committee. In 2007, she was selected as one of The Other Top 50 Rabbis by Letty Cottin Pogrebin.

Gottlieb led a Fellowship of Reconciliation delegation to Iran in 2008, thus becoming the first female rabbi to visit Iran and the first American rabbi to travel there "in a formal peacemaking capacity" since the 1979 Iranian Revolution.

A 2013 dissertation from the University of New Mexico's department of anthropology, “Storied Lives in a Living Tradition: Women Rabbis and Jewish Community in 21st Century New Mexico,” by Dr. Miria Kano, discusses Gottlieb and four other female rabbis of New Mexico.

== Palestine activism ==
Gottlieb points to a 1966 interview with a Palestinian journalist living in Nazareth as an important turning point in her pro-Palestine activism. She has said that she came to believe "way early on" that a Two-state solution "was not a possible solution."

She is a member of the Jewish Voice for Peace Rabbinical Council and advisory board and supports the Boycott, Divestment and Sanctions (BDS) campaign.

== The Torah of Nonviolence & Shomeret Shalom ==
Gottlieb has long been a nonviolence advocate and activist. She trained with James Lawson's Fellowship of Reconciliation.

She is the founder of the denominational affiliation "Shomeret shalom," or practicing the Torah of Nonviolence, a term she coined, and has co-founded and led a number of efforts under this denomination.

She describes the Shomeret Shalom movement as "a sevenfold nonviolent pathway which incorporates noncooperation with systemic violence and war as matters of religious observance." As of 2025, she has run a two-year course of study for Jewish communal leaders that culminates in ordination.

== Other affiliations ==
She serves as board chair of the Interfaith Movement for Human Integrity.

== Books ==
She authored She Who Dwells Within: A Feminist Vision of a Renewed Judaism (1995). She self-published "Shomeret Shalom: Replanting Seeds of Jewish Revolutionary Nonviolence after October 7th."
