= Phyllis Berman =

Founder of the Riverside Language Program in New York city

Phyllis Ocean Berman (born 1942) is a co-founder of the Riverside Language Program in New York City for adult immigrants and refugees. Opening in 1979, she traveled from her home in Mount Airy, Philadelphia via Amtrak to the school in New York City so that newly arrived immigrants could receive an intensive English-language education. She was its director until her retirement in 2016. She is a teacher and prayer leader in the Jewish Renewal movement as well as a political activist who writes about and has been arrested for non-violently protesting for immigrant rights.

Berman has been actively involved in the Jewish Renewal movement, serving as Director of the Summer Program of the Elat Chayyim Center for Healing and Renewal, co-leading retreats for the Awakened Heart Project and at the Hazon/Isabella Freedman Jewish Retreat Center, and teaching at ALEPH kallot. She was ordained by ALEPH in 2003 and has been recognized for her spiritual activism.

She has co-authored books with her husband Rabbi Arthur Waskow including Tales of Tikkun: New Jewish Stories to Heal the Wounded World, A Time for Every Purpose Under Heaven: The Jewish Life-Spiral As a Spiritual Journey, Freedom Journeys: Tales of Exodus & Wilderness across Millennia, and The Looooong Narrow Pharaoh & the Midwives Who Gave Birth to Freedom. Her articles have been published in magazines and online.
