= Cecília Maria Villas Bôas de Almeida =

Brazilian chemist and academic

Cecília Maria Villas Bôas de Almeida is a Brazilian chemist and academic.

She works at the São Paulo State University and the Laboratory of Production and Environment and is a co-editor-in-chief of the Journal of Cleaner Production.

== Education ==
Bôas de Almeida has a degree in chemical engineering from Mackenzie Presbyterian University and obtained a PhD in chemistry from the University of São Paulo in 1999.

== Career ==
Bôas de Almeida is employed as a professor at the Institute of Exact Sciences and Technology and runs the post-graduate program at the Post-Graduation for Production Engineering at São Paulo State University. Her work focuses on industrial ecology and cleaner production She is also employed as a researcher at the Laboratory of Production and Environment.

From 2012 to 2016, she was the executive editor of the journal Cleaner Production in Latin America, and since 2017 she has been the co-editor-in-chief of the Journal of Cleaner Production.
