= Andre Delbecq =

Late professor

André L. Delbecq
- Born: September 20, 1936; Toledo, Ohio
- Died: October 12, 2016 (aged 80)
- Scientific career
- Fields: Management
- Institutions: Santa Clara University

André L. Delbecq (1936–2016) was Thomas A. and Kathleen L. McCarthy University Professor at Leavey School of Business, Santa Clara University, in Santa Clara, California. He was the Eighth Dean of Fellows of the Academy of Management, President of the Western Academy of Management and Executive Director of the Organization Behavior Teaching Society. He was born in Toledo, Ohio, and died on October 12, 2016.

Delbecq "played a foundational role in developing and shaping the field of Spirituality and Business Leadership". His legacy was the focus of the 105-page January, 2020, special issue of the Journal of Management, Spirituality & Religion.
