= Kathryn Pavlovich =

New Zealand business academic

- Education: University of Waikato
- Scientific career
- Workplaces: University of Waikato
- Thesis: The organisation of supply in a tourism destination : an analysis of a networked community – the Waitomo Caves Village (2000)

Kathryn Pavlovich is a New Zealand business academic. She is currently a full professor at the University of Waikato.

== Academic career ==
After a 2000 PhD at the University of Waikato titled 'The organisation of supply in a tourism destination : an analysis of a networked community – the Waitomo Caves Village' , Pavlovich joined the staff, rising to full professor in 2015.

== Selected works ==
- Pavlovich, Kathryn. "The evolution and transformation of a tourism destination network: the Waitomo Caves, New Zealand." Tourism Management 24, no. 2 (2003): 203–216.
- Collins, Eva, Stewart Lawrence, Kathryn Pavlovich, and Chris Ryan. "Business networks and the uptake of sustainability practices: the case of New Zealand." Journal of Cleaner Production 15, no. 8-9 (2007): 729–740.
- Singh, Smita, Patricia Corner, and Kathryn Pavlovich. "Coping with entrepreneurial failure." Journal of Management & Organization 13, no. 4 (2007): 331–344.
- Lawrence, Steward R., Eva Collins, Kathryn Pavlovich, and Murugesh Arunachalam. "Sustainability practices of SMEs: the case of NZ." Business strategy and the environment 15, no. 4 (2006): 242–257.
- Lohmann, Guilherme, Sascha Albers, Benjamin Koch, and Kathryn Pavlovich. "From hub to tourist destination–An explorative study of Singapore and Dubai's aviation-based transformation." Journal of Air Transport Management 15, no. 5 (2009): 205–211.
