= Appreciative inquiry in education =

Appreciative Inquiry (AI) is an approach that believes improvement is more engaging when the focus is made on the strengths rather than the weaknesses. People tend to respond to positive statements but react to negative statements that concern them. Children are more sensitive to their self-worth and thrive on what makes them feel good, what makes them feel accepted, included and recognized. AI is a powerful tool that can be used in the field of Education to enable children discover what is good about them and dream of what they can do with this realization. People can be affected by the uses of AI.

== Overview ==
Appreciative Inquiry is the cooperative search for the best in people their organizations, and the world around them. It involves systematic discovery of what gives a system 'life' when it is most effective and capable in economic, ecological, and human terms. AI involves the art and practice of asking questions that strengthen a system's capacity to heighten positive potential. It mobilizes inquiry through crafting an "unconditional positive question' often involving hundreds or sometimes thousands of people."

== Application ==
Applied in the education sector, AI is a cooperative search for the best in children, their school, their teachers, their classmates, their parents and this discovery influences and helps shape their image of the future. It all begins with a story which the appreciative inquirer tells about him/herself and this story is only about where the child has experienced the best of what he could e.g. in reading, writing, passing tests and exams. With this flow of energy from past experience, the child is poised for a similar experience in the future and so nurtures all that give energy and brings joy of performance, acceptance and readiness to move ahead. AI starts with a statement of purpose or object of inquiry and which then takes the inquirer through the five steps (known as the 5Ds of AI) and graphically illustrated as follows:

Refer the picture in

Appreciative Inquiry in the education sector can amplify the motivation of the students and help them become most alive and effective. AI brings about social change in the pupil as the emphasis is on what is good and the belief that people nurture what they appreciate, than what they are not happy about. The system of education can be based on the five principles of AI that will enable the child discover through her/his own story, what is good about him/her and dream of how he/she can capitalize on this story of goodness to do more of such things that he/she appreciates about himself, about his environment, about his world.

== Principles ==
A quick look at the principles will enable the understanding of why AI is suitable for our education system: i. Constructionist Principle – argues that the language and metaphors we use don't just describe reality (the world), they actually create 'our 'reality (the world). It means that great care is taken in the choice of words that we use as it will influence the kind of future we create. The language of the teacher influences what the child considers as his/her reality and this influences his self-perception and hence his self-worth which is very important for what he/she becomes in future. ii. Principle of Simultaneity – change begins from the moment we ask a question about a thing. The heart of AI is an unconditional positive question. For example, – what was the best thing that has happened to you in the last week? iii. The Poetic Principle - as the topic of inquiry is on what is good about the individual or the environment, this helps open a new chapter in the life of the child. Stories reveal qualities which had not been previously realized and appreciated. iv. The Anticipatory Principle – we grow into the images we create, hence, when the child is made to see himself as good, his imagination about his future will always be good enough and as magnet this imagined future will always pull the child towards this goal. v. The Positive Principle – feelings of hope, inspiration, caring, sense of purpose, joy and creating something meaningful or being part of something good are among what we define as positive. It is therefore, important that the questions asked to the child are affirmative and positive.

It allows a student to be potentially free from any kind of bondage or control. AI gives an opportunity for the students to showcase their innovative side rather than just rote memory. This in turn makes them autonomous learners. The students are able to understand their strengths every time their potentials are amplified. Use of this in the educational sector would bring about a sea of difference as there would be more room for amplifying the existing positive energy. Even the basic assumptions of AI which includes the assumption that 'in every human situation, there is something that works" is a clear indication that no child is incapable of producing a result that would even surprise the child him/herself. All that the child needs are such questions that would enable him/her tap into the core of his/her being.

The system of education which relies on an average test or examination grades label children who do not meet the marks as 'failed'. AI in education enables the child to identify the subjects where he/she is very satisfied with the performance, and through story, the child discovers what he/she did differently and how to tap this aspect for more satisfaction. This is why AI is also referred as 'locating the energy for change'. It is a search for what is good through stories and what needs to be done through dreams. AI brings a dream to reality because, motivation for the future depends on the images of success of the past.

== Educational reform movement ==
One of the strands of educational reform movements in the last two decades has been the call for greater collaborative efforts, both among educators as well as with parents, students and the surrounding community. Educational researcher Hargreaves (1994) referred to collaboration as an 'articulating and integrating principle' (p. 245) for school improvement, providing a way for teachers to learn from each other, gain moral support, coordinate action, and reflect on their classroom practices, their values, and the meaning of their work .

These concerns point to the need for a change process that has a positive focus, is essentially self-organizing, encourages deep reflection, and avoids the pitfalls of manipulation by school administrators. This analysis points to a consideration of appreciative inquiry, a strengths-based process that builds on 'the best of what is' in an organization.
