= Arthur Waskow =

American author, political activist and rabbi (1933–2025)

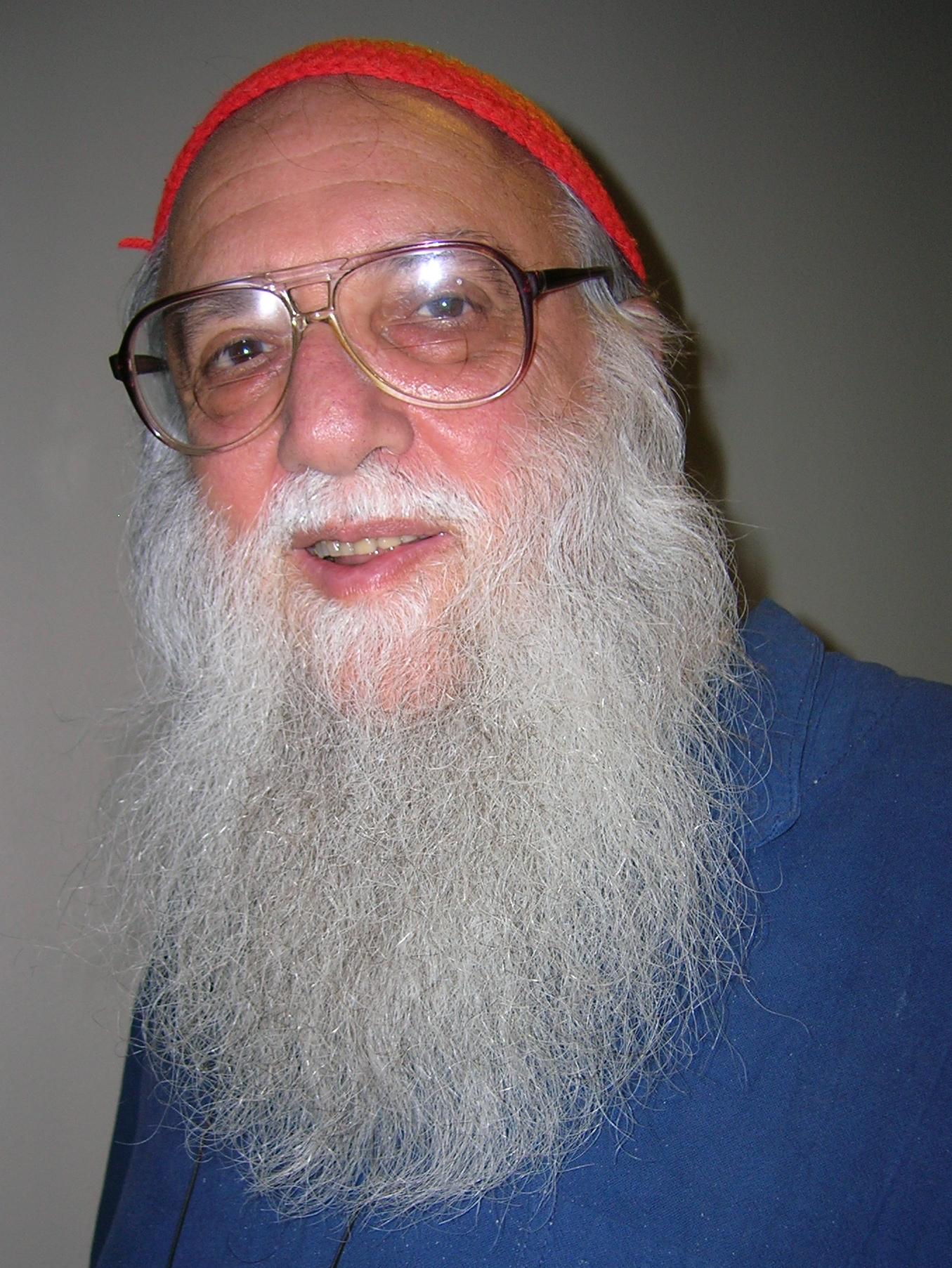
- Born: Arthur Irwin Waskow; October 12, 1933; Baltimore, Maryland, U.S.
- Died: October 20, 2025 (aged 92); Philadelphia, Pennsylvania, U.S.
- Occupation: Author; political activist; rabbi
- Movement: Jewish Renewal
- Spouse: Irene Elkin (married 1957-1978) Phyllis Berman (married 1986-2025)
- Children: 2

Arthur Ocean Waskow (born Arthur Irwin Waskow, October 12, 1933 – October 20, 2025) was an American author, political activist, and rabbi associated with the Jewish Renewal movement.

== Education and early career ==
Waskow was born in Baltimore, Maryland, on October 12, 1933. He received a bachelor's degree from Johns Hopkins University in 1954 and a PhD in American history from University of Wisconsin–Madison. He worked from 1959 to 1961 as legislative assistant to Congressman Robert Kastenmeier of Wisconsin. He was a senior fellow at the Peace Research Institute from 1961 through 1963. He joined Richard Barnet and Marcus Raskin and helped to found the Institute for Policy Studies in 1963, and he served as resident fellow until 1977.

In 1968 Waskow was elected an alternate delegate from the District of Columbia to the Democratic National Convention in Chicago. His delegation was pledged to support Robert F. Kennedy, and after Kennedy's assassination, Waskow proposed and the delegation agreed to nominate Reverend Channing Phillips, chair of the delegation, for President, the first Black American to be nominated at a major party convention.

Waskow was a contributing editor to Ramparts magazine, which published his "Freedom Seder" in 1969. The "Freedom Seder" was the first widely published Passover Haggadah that intertwined the archetypal liberation of the Israelites from slavery in Ancient Egypt with more modern liberation struggles such as the Civil Rights Movement and the women's movement.

Through the 1960s, Waskow was active in writing, speaking, electoral politics, and nonviolent action against the Vietnam War. After 1963, he participated in sit-ins and teach-ins and was arrested many times for protests against racial segregation, the Vietnam War, the Soviet Union's oppression of Jews, South African apartheid, and the Iraq war. In 1967, he was the co-author, with Marcus Raskin, of "A Call to Resist Illegitimate Authority," a widely influential manifesto in support of those who resisted the military draft during the Vietnam War. In 1968, he signed the "Writers and Editors War Tax Protest" pledge, vowing to refuse tax payments in protest against U.S. involvement in the Vietnam War.

== Religious initiatives ==
From 1969, Waskow took a leadership role in the Jewish Renewal movement. In 1971, he helped found the Fabrangen Havurah in Washington, DC. He noted that his experience at Fabrangen inspired his 1978 book Godwrestling. From 1982 to 1989, Waskow was a member of the faculty of the Reconstructionist Rabbinical College, where he taught courses on contemporary theology and practical rabbinics. He also taught in the religion departments of Swarthmore College, Temple University, Drew University, and Vassar College.

He founded The Shalom Center in 1983 and served as its director. At first the center primarily addressed the threat of nuclear war; as the times demanded, it turned its focus toward ecology and human rights, then opposition to attacks on American Muslims and to the US War in Iraq, and more recently the dangers of global warming and the climate crisis. In 1993, Waskow co-founded ALEPH: Alliance for Jewish Renewal. Between 1993 and 2005, he performed research, wrote, and spoke on behalf of ALEPH.

Waskow was ordained a rabbi in 1995 by a transdenominational beth din (rabbinical court) made up of Rabbi Zalman Schachter-Shalomi, with Lubavitch Hasidic lineage; Rabbi Max Ticktin, ordained by the Jewish Theological Seminary (Conservative); Rabbi Laura Geller, ordained by the Hebrew Union College (Reform); and feminist theologian Dr. Judith Plaskow.

Waskow's best-known books include Godwrestling, Seasons of Our Joy, Down-to-Earth Judaism: Food, Money, Sex, and the Rest of Life, and Godwrestling — Round 2: Ancient Wisdom, Future Paths. With Sr. Joan Chittister, OSB, and Murshid Saadi Shakur Chisti, he co-authored The Tent of Abraham. With Rabbi Phyllis Berman he co-authored Tales of Tikkun: New Jewish Stories to Heal the Wounded World, A Time for Every Purpose Under Heaven: The Jewish Life-Spiral as a Spiritual Journey, and Freedom Journeys: Tales of Exodus and Wilderness Across Millennia. He was the managing co-editor of Trees, Earth, and Torah: A Tu B'Shvat Anthology, and he edited Torah of the Earth: 4,000 Years of Jewish Thought on Ecology (2 vols).

== Views and public honors ==
Waskow took pioneering roles in supporting the full presence and equality of women and of LGBTQ people in all aspects of Jewish life and religion, including same-sex marriage; in mobilizing opposition in the Jewish and general communities to the Vietnam and then the Iraq wars; beginning in 1969, after his first summer-long sojourn in Israel and visits to the Occupied Territories, urging a two-state peace settlement between Israel and Palestine; in treating the planetary climate and extinction crises as a profound concern of Torah, necessitating action by the Jewish community; and in urging the Jewish community to treat the increasing concentration of top-down power by small minorities of the ultra-rich and by giant corporations as the reappearance of "pharaoh" in modern American life. In 2011, he (with Daniel Sieradski) co-inspired the creation of "Kol Nidre in the Streets" as a part of Occupy Wall Street. Since spring 2012 he has been a member of the Coordinating Committee of the US National Council of Elders, a network of veteran activists of the crucial justice and peace movements of the mid-20th century who are continuing their nonviolent social action and are partnering with the new movements of the 21st century.

Waskow pioneered in the development of Eco-Judaism in theology, liturgy, daily practice, and activism—through his books mentioned above as well as Torah of the Earth: 4,000 Years of Ecology in Jewish Thought and his essay on “Jewish Environmental Ethics: Adam and Adamah,” in Oxford Handbook of Jewish Ethics and Morality. Other activities included the Green Menorah organizing project of The Shalom Center, the Interfaith Freedom Seder for the Earth and climate-focused public actions drawing on traditional liturgies for Tu B’Shvat, Passover, Tisha B’Av, Sukkot, and Hanukkah, and running as a candidate for the World Zionist Congress on the Green Zionist Alliance slate. In 2010, Waskow joined in founding the Green Hevra, a network of Eco-Jewish organizations, and served on its stewardship committee till 2013. In 2012 he became a member of the steering committee of Interfaith Moral Action on Climate. He was also a practitioner of nonviolent civil disobedience who has been arrested in climate protests in the US Capitol, at the White House, and at Philadelphia conclaves of fracking corporate leaders.

In 2007, Newsweek named him one of the fifty most influential American rabbis. In that year also, the Neighborhood Interfaith Movement of Philadelphia presented him its Rev. Richard Fernandez Religious Leadership Award, and the Muslim American Society Freedom Foundation presented him its Peace and Justice Award. The Forward named him one of America's "Forward Fifty," creative leaders of American Jewish life. In 2014 he was honored by T'ruah: The Rabbinic Call for Human Rights with its first Lifetime Achievement Award as a Human Rights Hero. In 2015, The Jewish Daily Forward named him one of "America's most inspiring rabbis".

In 2017, the Reconstructionist Rabbinical College awarded Waskow its once-a-year honorary doctorate of humane letters.

Waskow taught as a Visiting Professor in the religion departments of Swarthmore College (1982–83, on the thought of Martin Buber and on the Book of Genesis and its rabbinic and modern interpretations); Temple University (1975–76 on contemporary Jewish theology and 1985–86, on liberation theologies in Judaism, Christianity, and Islam); Drew University (1997–1998, on the ecological outlooks of ancient, rabbinic, and contemporary Judaism and on the synthesis of mysticism, feminism, and social action in the theology and practice of Jewish renewal); Vassar College (1999 on Jewish Renewal and Feminist Judaism); from 1982 to 1989 on the faculty of the Reconstructionist Rabbinical College (contemporary theology and practical rabbinics); and in 2005 on the faculty of the Hebrew Union College-Jewish Institute for Religion (the first course on Eco-Judaism in any rabbinical seminary).

Beginning with his first arrest in 1963, in a walk-in to end racial segregation by a Baltimore amusement park, and continuing through his arrest at the US Capitol in 2016 in a protest calling for more democratic election processes in the US — getting what he called "Hyper-Wealth" out of election campaigns and ending voter suppression aimed at disfranchising especially racial and ethnic minorities, the poor, the young, and the old— and most recently with arrests in Philadelphia at the ICE offices in protest of US governmental hostility to refugees and immigrants—he was arrested about 26 additional times, each time for a non-violent protest against racism, militarism, polluting the Earth, or interference with democratic process. He claimed each as a public honor and religious act, in the spirit of the remark by Rabbi Abraham Joshua Heschel after the Selma March for voting rights: "I felt as if my legs were praying."

He continued to be a prolific writer and speaker in the public sphere on the topic of social justice through a Jewish Renewal lens. The Arthur Ocean Waskow Papers (1948–2009) are archived at the American Jewish Historical Society. More recent papers are archived at the University of Colorado in Boulder.

== Death ==
Waskow died at his Philadelphia home on October 20, 2025, at the age of 92.

== Bibliography ==
- Arthur I. Waskow (1962). The Limits of Defense. Doubleday.
- Arthur I. Waskow; Stanley L. Newman (1962). America in Hiding. Ballantine Books.
- Arthur I. Waskow (1965). The Debate Over Thermonuclear Strategy. Heath.
- Arthur I. Waskow (1966). From race riot to sit-in, 1919 and the 1960s: a study in the connections between conflict and violence. Peter Smith. ISBN 9780844631394.
- Arthur I. Waskow; Marcus Raskin (1967). A Call to Resist Illegitimate Authority.
- Arthur I. Waskow (1970). The Worried Man's Guide to World Peace: A Peace Research Institute Handbook. Smith.
- Arthur I. Waskow (1970). The Freedom Seder: A New Haggadah for Passover. Holt-Rinehart-Winston. ISBN 978-0030846816.
- Arthur I. Waskow (1970). Running riot: a journey through the official disasters and creative disorder in American society. Herder and Herder.
- Arthur I. Waskow (1971). The Bush Is Burning! Radical Judaism Faces The Pharaohs of the Modern Superstate. Macmillan.
- Arthur I. Waskow (1978). God-Wrestling. Schocken Books.
- Arthur I. Waskow (1983). These Holy Sparks: The Rebirth of the Jewish People. Harper and Row. ISBN 0060692634.
- Arthur Waskow; David Waskow; Shoshana Waskow (1984). Before There Was A Before. Illustrated by Amnon Danziger. Adama Books. ISBN 978-0915361083.
- Arthur Waskow (1984). "The Rainbow Seder". In New Jewish Agenda (ed.). The Shalom Seders: Three Haggadahs. Adama Books. ISBN 978-0-915361-03-8.
- Arthur Waskow (1985). "Transarmament: A Jewish Nuclear Strategy". Sh'ma: A Journal of Jewish Responsibility. 15 (297): 132–136.
- Arthur Ocean Waskow; Martin Farren (1990). Seasons of Our Joy: A Modern Guide to the Jewish Holidays. Beacon Press. ISBN 978-0-8070-3611-2.
- Howard Waskow; Arthur I. Waskow (1993). Becoming Brothers. Simon and Schuster. ISBN 978-0-02-933997-8.
- Arthur Waskow (April 15, 1994). "What is the Sacred Text for Yom Hashoah?". Sh'ma: A Journal of Jewish Responsibility. 24 (472): 1–3.
- Arthur O. Waskow (November 1995). Godwrestling – Round 2: Ancient Wisdom, Future Paths. LongHill Partners, Incorporated. ISBN 978-1-68336-098-8.
- Phyllis Ocean Berman; Arthur Ocean Waskow (1996). Tales of Tikkun: New Jewish Stories to Heal the Wounded World. Jason Aronson. ISBN 978-1-56821-991-2.
- Arthur O. Waskow (1997). Down-to-Earth Judaism: Food, Money, Sex, And The Rest Of Life. HarperCollins. ISBN 978-0-688-15127-0.
- Arthur Waskow; Sarah Bluestain (March 31, 1998). "A Paradoxical Legacy: Rabbi Shlomo Carlebach's shadow side". Lilith. Vol. 23, no. 1. pp. 10–17.
- Ari Elon; Naomi Mara Hyman; Arthur Waskow, eds. (2000). Trees, Earth, and Torah: A Tu B'Shvat Anthology. Jewish Publication Society. ISBN 978-0-8276-0717-0.
- Arthur Ocean Waskow, ed. (2000). Torah of the Earth: Exploring 4,000 Years of Ecology in Jewish Thought. Jewish Lights Publishing. ISBN 978-1-58023-086-5.
- Arthur Ocean Waskow; Phyllis Ocean Berman (September 2003). A Time for Every Purpose Under Heaven: The Jewish Life-Spiral As a Spiritual Path. Farrar, Straus & Giroux. ISBN 978-0-374-52897-3.
- Joan Chittister; Arthur Waskow; Saadi Shakur Chishti (2007). The Tent of Abraham: Stories of Hope and Peace for Jews, Christians, and Muslims. Beacon Press. ISBN 978-0-8070-7729-0.
- Arthur Waskow (Summer 2008). "Green Menorah Covenant Coalition: Personal, Congregational, and Public-Policy Changes to Avert Global Scorching". Jewish Education News. Coalition for the Advancement of Jewish Education (CAJE).
- Arthur Ocean Waskow; Phyllis Ocean Berman (2011). Freedom Journeys: The Tale of Exodus and Wilderness Across Millennia. Jewish Lights Publishing. ISBN 978-1-58023-445-0.
- Arthur Waskow (2013). "Jewish Environmental Ethics: Intertwining Adam and Adamah". In Elliot N. Dorff; Jonathan K. Crane (eds.). The Oxford Handbook of Jewish Ethics and Morality. OUP USA. ISBN 978-0-19-973606-5.
- Arthur Ocean Waskow (2016). The Rest of Creation. Illustrated by Avi Katz. Albion-Andalus Books. ISBN 978-0692767122.
- Arthur Ocean Waskow; Phyllis Ocean Berman (2016). The Looooong Narrow Pharaoh & the Midwives Who Gave Birth to Freedom. Albion-Andalus Books. ISBN 978-0-692-75721-5.
- Arthur Ocean Waskow (2020). Dancing in God's Earthquate: The Coming Transformation of Religion. Orbis Books. ISBN 978-1-608-33864-1.
- Arthur Ocean Waskow (2026). Tales of the Spirit Rising and Sometimes Falling: A Memoir. Monkfish Book Publishing. ISBN 978-1-966608073.
