= The Open Road: The Global Journey of the Fourteenth Dalai Lama =

2008 book by Pico Iyer

- Author: Pico Iyer
- Language: English
- Subject: 14th Dalai Lama
- Genre: Non-fiction
- Publisher: Alfred A. Knopf
- Publication date: 2008
- ISBN: 978-0-307-26760-3

The Open Road: The Global Journey of the Fourteenth Dalai Lama is a 2008 book by Pico Iyer.

The Dalai Lama calls himself "a simple Buddhist monk", but he is also a public figure who frequents religious gatherings and official meetings. He is also a politician on the global stage. The book is an attempt to capture some of the conversations that the author has had with the Dalai Lama.
