= Jewish Renewal =

Movement in Judaism

Jewish Renewal (Hebrew: התחדשות יהודית, romanized: Hitḥadeshut Yehudit) is a Jewish religious movement originating in the 20th century that endeavors to reinvigorate modern Judaism with Kabbalistic, Hasidic, and musical practices. Specifically, it seeks to reintroduce the "ancient Judaic traditions of mysticism and meditation, gender equality and ecstatic prayer" to synagogue services. It is distinct from the baal teshuva movement of "return" to religious observance of Orthodox Judaism.

== Overview ==
The term "Jewish Renewal" describes "a set of practices within Judaism that attempt to reinvigorate what it views as a moribund and uninspiring Judaism with mystical, Hasidic, musical and meditative practices drawn from a variety of traditional and untraditional, Jewish and other, sources. In this sense, Jewish Renewal is an approach to Judaism that can be found within segments of any of the Jewish denominations".

The term also refers to an emerging Jewish movement, the Jewish Renewal movement, which describes itself as "a worldwide, transdenominational movement grounded in Judaism's prophetic and mystical traditions". The Jewish Renewal movement incorporates social views such as egalitarianism, environmentalism and pacifism.

Jewish Renewal rabbi Barbara Thiede writes:

Jewish Renewal will joyfully embrace music, meditation, chant, yoga, and storytelling in the practice of Judaism. Jewish Renewal reads Torah as our deepest challenge and our most precious gift ... Jewish Renewal is about learning the why and not just the how. It's about plumbing the very depths of why so that we can hear our private and godly voices of truth ... Ideas, texts, tradition – Jewish understanding laced together in a sweet web of life so clearly that I could unpack the teaching as easily as I could unzip a boot.

The movement's most prominent leader was Zalman Schachter-Shalomi. Other leaders, teachers and authors associated with Jewish Renewal include Arthur Waskow, Michael Lerner, Tirzah Firestone, Phyllis Berman, Shefa Gold, David Ingber, and Marcia Prager.

Jewish Renewal brings kabbalistic and Hasidic theory and practice into a non-Orthodox, egalitarian framework, a phenomenon sometimes referred to as neo-Hasidism. Like Hasidic Jews, Renewal Jews often add to traditional worship ecstatic practices such as meditation, chant and dance. In augmenting Jewish ritual, some Renewal Jews borrow freely and openly from Buddhism, Sufism and other faiths.

== History ==
=== Origins ===
Jewish Renewal, in its most general sense, has its origins in the North American Jewish countercultural trends of the late 1960s and early 1970s. During this period, groups of young rabbis, academics and political activists founded experimental chavurot (singular: chavurah) or "fellowships" for prayer and study, in reaction to what they perceived as an over-institutionalized and unspiritual North American Jewish establishment.

Also initially, some of these groups, like the Boston-area Havurat Shalom attempted to function as full-fledged communes after the model of their secular counterparts. Others formed as communities within the urban or suburban Jewish establishment. Founders of the havurot included the liberal political activist Arthur Waskow, Michael Strassfeld (who later became rabbi for a Conservative congregation and then moved on to serve a major Reconstructionist congregation), and Zalman Schachter-Shalomi. Although the leadership and ritual privileges were initially men-only, as in Orthodox Jewish practice, the second wave of American feminism soon led to the full integration of women in these communities. Lynn Gottlieb became the first female rabbi in Jewish Renewal in 1981.

=== Chavurot ===
Apart from some tentative articles in Response and other Jewish student magazines, the early chavurot attracted little attention in the wider North American Jewish community. Then, in 1973, Richard Siegel, and Michael and Sharon Strassfeld released The Jewish Catalog: A Do-It-Yourself Kit. Patterned after the Whole Earth Catalog, the book served both as a basic reference on Judaism and American Jewish life, as well as a playful compendium of Jewish crafts, recipes, meditational practices, and political action ideas, all aimed at disaffected young Jewish adults. The Jewish Catalog became one of the bestselling books in American Jewish history to that date and spawned two sequels.

In an interview (published in Zeek in 2012), scholar and folklorist Chava Weissler, who has been a "participant-observer" in both the Chavurah movement and in Jewish Renewal, said:

CW: I often use the following metaphor: the Havurah movement represents the Misnagdim and the Renewal movement the Hasidim of the Jewish counter-culture. The style of the Havurah movement is more cognitive, and the style of Renewal is more expressive and devotional. Also, the Havurah movement has a deep aversion to the "rebbe" model, while the Renewal movement has seen it as a way into a heightened spirituality.

ZEEK: The Hasidim/Misnagdim analogy is a fascinating one, though I can see how some folks in the Havurah movement might have bones to pick there.

CW: Especially because we saw ourselves as reinstating Hasidism, or parts of it. Some years ago, a well-known Renewal teacher taught at the Havurah Institute. I asked him how he felt it compared to the Kallah and Renewal. And he said, 'the havurah movement is so unspiritual, it really bothered me ... when they have a study class, they go in, open the text, study, close the text and you're done. When I teach a class, we sit in silence, we open our hearts to the text, we sing a niggun, we study the text, we process what's happened to us, then we sing another niggun and sit in silence again to receive what we've received.'

My havurah friends were outraged that he would say the Havurah movement isn't spiritual! But it's a different model of spirituality and also of study ...

=== B'nai Or / P'nai Or ===
Zalman Schachter-Shalomi, a Hasidic-trained rabbi ordained in the Lubavitch movement, broke with Orthodox Judaism beginning in the 1960s, and founded his own organization, The B'nai Or Religious Fellowship, which he described in an article entitled "Toward an Order of B'nai Or".

In 1985, after the first national Kallah (conference) gathering in Radnor, Pennsylvania, the name was changed from B'nai Or to P'nai Or ("Faces of Light") to reflect the more egalitarian perspective of the rising feminist movement. Together with such colleagues as Arthur Waskow, Schachter-Shalomi broadened the focus of his organization. In 1993 it merged with The Shalom Center, founded by Waskow, to become ALEPH: Alliance for Jewish Renewal.

In 1979, Waskow had founded a magazine called Menorah, which explored and encouraged many creative ritual and social issues from a Jewish perspective. It was in this publication that Waskow coined the term "Jewish Renewal". In 1986, Menorah merged with The B'nai Or Newsletter to become New Menorah, now available online through ALEPH. The new version of the publication addressed Jewish feminism, the nuclear arms race, new forms of prayer, social justice, etc. Several of the early New Menorah issues explored gay rights, and became an important catalyst for opening this discussion in more mainstream synagogues.

The executive-director of ALEPH said in 2016 that 50 Jewish Renewal communities had been established in the United States, Canada, Latin America, Europe and Israel.

== Beliefs ==
=== Marriage ===
A 2000 resolution allows synagogues to decide about same-sex marriage.

== Renewal and the contemporary Jewish community ==
Statistics on the number of Jews who identify themselves as "Renewal" are not readily available. However, the evidence of Renewal influence can be found throughout the spectrum of Jewish denominational affiliation and in many diverse other arenas of Jewish life.

Jewish Renewal is "part of the burgeoning world of transdenominational Judaism—the growing number of synagogues, rabbis and prayer groups that eschew affiliation with a Jewish stream".

Rabbi Marcia Prager wrote in 2005:

Jewish Renewal is a "movement" in the sense of a wave in motion, a grassroots effort to discover the modern meaning of Judaism as a spiritual practice. Jewish-renewalists see "renewal" as a process reaching beyond denominational boundaries and institutional structures, more similar to the multi-centered civil rights or women's movements than to contemporary denominations.

=== Ordination ===
ALEPH offers a Rabbinical Ordination Program ("semicha"). The Rabbinical school curriculum requires a minimum of 62 units of study - the equivalent of five years of full-time graduate level study - and combines low-residency and residential / retreat-based components. See List of rabbinical schools § Other denominations. Previously, AOP also offered these students a Master of Divinity and Doctor of Ministry in cooperation with the now defunct New York Theological Seminary (NYTS).

== Criticism and response ==
=== New Age Judaism ===
Jewish Renewal has been criticized for emphasizing individual spiritual experience and New Age practices over communal norms and Jewish textual literacy.

The ALEPH website offers the following response:

Jewish Renewal is sometimes referred to as "New Age" by people who do not know that meditation, dance, chant, and mysticism have been present in Judaism throughout the ages and not, as some mistakenly believe, patched on to Judaism from other cultures or made up out of whole cloth. Sadly, some of our authentic, time-honored beliefs and practices have been lost to assimilation, leaving many contemporary Jews largely unaware of them. This is a major reason why so many spiritually sensitive Jews have sought spiritual expression in other faith traditions. It is an important part of ALEPH's mission to make the "hidden" treasures of Judaism known and accessible to these seekers.

=== Mainstreaming ===
Many Jewish Renewal techniques, ideas, and practices have become mainstream and are now familiar to Jews across the denominations, according to claims by the movement:

Three decades after Reb Zalman began reaching out to disenfranchised Jews with a hands-on, mystically inflected, radically egalitarian, liturgically inventive, neo-chasidic approach, many of the techniques he pioneered—from meditation to describing God in new terms--are widely employed in mainstream settings.

Despite the prevalence of Renewal practices, ideas, and teachings across the denominational spectrum, Jewish Renewal is not always known or credited with having originated these teachings and ideas. "Our influence is penetrating much deeper into the mainstream, but without acknowledgement," said Rabbi Daniel Siegel. "There is still a lot of ignorance and prejudice toward us in other movements."

=== Reception ===
Some within the Renewal community say that the movement has been more successful in providing occasional ecstatic "peak experiences" at worship services and spiritual retreats than in inculcating a daily discipline of religious practice. Others have said there is a tension within the community between those who prefer to focus on liberal social activism on American, Middle East and global issues; and those who favor an emphasis on meditation, text study and worship. A summer 2017 article in The Forward said there are tensions within ALEPH that have led many of its recent and in particular younger leaders not directly associated with the movement's early years to walk away, preferring to pursue the renewal of Judaism outside that organization.

== See also ==
- Neo-Hasidism
