= Nadya Zhexembayeva =

Author

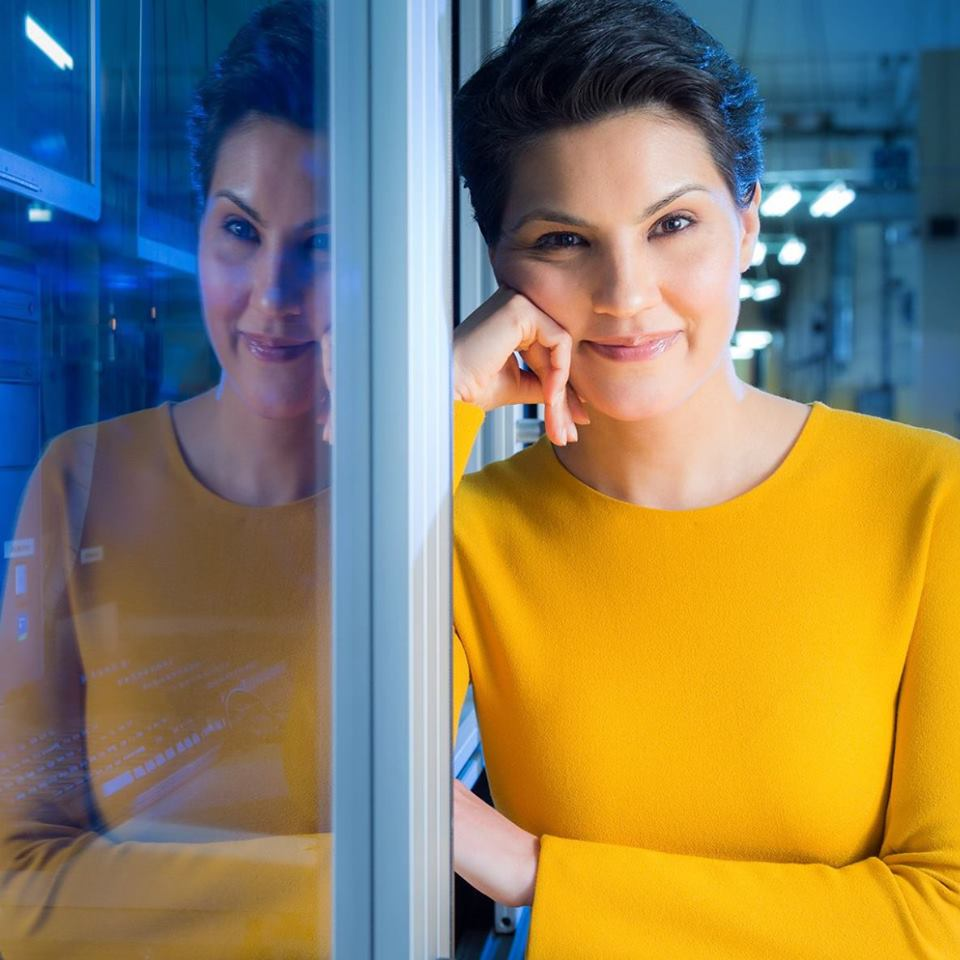
- Nadya Zhexembayeva
- Born: Almaty, Kazakhstan
- Education: Hartwick College (B.A.); Case Western Reserve University (PhD)
- Occupations: Author, educator, business theorist, serial entrepreneur
- Writing career
- Language: English, Russian
- Genre: Non-fiction
- Notable works: The Chief Reinvention Officer Handbook; Overfished Ocean Strategy; Embedded Sustainability; Titanic Syndrome
- Website: https://www.learn2reinvent.com/

Nadya Zhexembayeva (Russian: Надя Жексембаева) is a Kazakhstan-born author, educator, and business theorist. She is widely recognized as the founder of the cross-disciplinary field of reinvention in management science. This new approach integrates strategy, innovation, change management, foresight, design thinking, Agile/SCRUM, and leadership into a unified capability for thriving in disruption.

== Early life and career ==
Dr. Zhexembayeva grew up in Almaty, Kazakhstan (then part of the Soviet Union), at the time she claims the country was "going through immense deterioration". While still at high school, Zhexembayeva started her business career selling insurance and later worked as a trainer at Association of Young Leaders, then went on to earn a Freedom Support Act scholarship that allowed her to complete two Bachelor of Arts degrees in Management and then Psychology from Hartwick College, where she was named a Faculty Scholar and John Christopher Hartwick Scholar – "the highest honor the College can confer upon a student". In 2008, she obtained her Doctor of Philosophy degree from Case Western Reserve University, where she served as associate director of the Center for Business as an Agent of World Benefit at Weatherhead School of Management, where as of 2016, she continues to serve on the Board of Advisors.

Dr. Zhexembayeva served as the Coca-Cola Chaired Professor of Sustainable Development at IEDC-Bled School of Management, an executive education center based in the Slovene Alps, where, as of 2016, she continues to teach courses in leadership, strategy, change management, design thinking, and sustainability. In addition to IEDC, Zhexembayeva has taught in other business schools, including CEDEP (France) and IPADE Business School (Mexico).

As a speaker, she has shared her insights with audiences worldwide through keynotes, panel presentations, and workshops. She has delivered four TEDx talks in Austria, Slovenia, the US., and Romania.

In 2007, Zhexembayeva co-founded WE EXIST Reinvention Agency. Based on Zhexembayeva's work with the Coca-Cola Company, ENRC Plc, IBM, CISCO, Erste Bank, Henkel, Knauf Insulation, and Vienna Insurance Group on reinventing products, processes, and leadership practices in Ventures magazine called Zhexembayeva ‘The Reinvention Guru’, while TEDx Navasink named her ‘The Queen of Reinvention.’

== Founding the field of Reinvention ==
In 2015, Zhexembayeva introduced reinvention as a formal organizational prerogative in the manifesto Built to Reinvent: The Ten Commandments of Today’s Sustainable Company, published on the intellectual platform ChangeThis, which was used by luminaries such as Seth Godin, Guy Kawasaki, and Tom Peters to introduce some of the most cutting-edge ideas in business and management. The same year, she gave a TEDx Talk titled To Hold On, Let Go, advocating for every company to have a Chief Reinvention Officer and every country to appoint a Minister of Reinvention.

This marked the beginning of Dr.Zhexembayeva's public effort to establish reinvention as a distinct management discipline. The timing was grounded in a fundamental shift she observed: the speed of change had begun to outpace the capacity of traditional business tools. In her keynote at the 2025 Reinvention Summit, she shared data showing that the average lifespan of a business model dropped from 75 years to just 6 years.

Her research with over 2,000 professionals, cited in multiple articles including Harvard Business Review, revealed that more than 60% of companies must reinvent every three years or less to stay competitive.

She argues that most of the management field—from strategic planning to budgeting and HR practices—was developed for a much more stable era. In contrast, today’s businesses operate in an environment of permanent disruption, requiring them to treat reinvention not as a one-time response to crisis but as a repeatable, scalable process integrated across the entire organization.

In 2020, she published The Chief Reinvention Officer Handbook: How to Thrive in Chaos, introducing the Six-Pillar Framework of Reinvention:

- Anticipate Change – strategy and foresight
- Design Change – innovation and design thinking
- Implement Change – change management, project management, Agile/SCRUM, and organizational development
- Reinvention Mindset, Culture, and Systems – supporting disciplines including leadership, HR, finance, and operations

This framework integrates fragmented management tools into a continuous, organization-wide capability.

== Reinvention Academy & The Reinvention Summit ==
In 2014, Zhexembayeva founded the Reinvention Academy with the mission to provide 1 billion people with strong resilience and reinvention skills. In 2020, she hosted the first virtual Reinvention Summit with 2,000+ participants; in 2025, together with Aidan McCullen, Michael Durkan and Neil Jordan, she hosted the first in-person Reinvention Summit in Dublin, Ireland with participants from 38 countries.

== Academic recognition ==
Reinvention is now taught in academic institutions worldwide:

- BTU – Business and Technology University (Georgia)
- McGill University (Canada)
- Almaty Management University (Kazakhstan)
- Simmons University (United States)

== Other contributions ==
Dr. Nadya Zhexembayeva coined the term "Titanic Syndrome," which she defines as "a corporate or individual disease in which organizations facing disruption bring about their own downfall through arrogance, excessive attachment to past success, or an inability to recognize the new and emerging reality."

Together with Dr. Chris Laszlo, Dr. Zhexembayeva co-authored the concept of "Embedded Sustainability" (in contrast to "bolt-on" or "band-aid" sustainability, defined as "the incorporation of environmental, health, and social value into core business activities with no trade-off in price or quality."

== Books ==
Dr. Nadya Zhexembayeva has written four books and contributed to six others that focus on strategy, innovation, reinvention and sustainability.

Author:

- The Reinvention Advantage: How to Survive and Monetize Volatility in the World That Won't Settle Down (2026)
- The Chief Reinvention Officer Handbook: How to Thrive in Chaos (2020)
- Titanic Syndrome: Why Companies Fail and How To Reinvent Your Way Out of Any Business Disaster (2018)
- Overfished Ocean Strategy: Powering Up Innovation for a Resource-Deprived World (2014)
- Embedded Sustainability: The Next Big Competitive Advantage (2011)

Chapter contributor:

- The Business of Building a Better World: The Leadership Revolution That Is Changing Everything (2021)
- Sustainable Business: A One Planet Approach (2017)
- Practicing Organization Development: Leading Transformation and Change (2015)
- Globally Responsible Leadership: Managing According to the UN Global Compact (2013)
- Positive Design and Appreciative Construction: From Sustainable Development to Sustainable Value (2010) (Full citation: Nadya Zhexembayeva (2010), A whole new value: Driving innovation, sustainability, and prosperity through appreciative inquiry, in Tojo Thatchenkery, David L. Cooperrider, Michel Avital (ed.) Positive Design and Appreciative Construction: From Sustainable Development to Sustainable Value (Advances in Appreciative Inquiry, Volume 3) Emerald Group Publishing Limited, pp. 77 – 96)
- Handbook of Transformative Cooperation: New Designs and Dynamics (2007)

== Articles and reports ==
- "What if volatility became your competitive advantage?" I by IMD magazine, 23 September 2026.
- "Titanic Syndrome: Why Companies Sink and How to Prevent it Happening to You". Real Leaders magazine. 15 June 2021.
- "Change Is Not a Project". The European Financial Review. November 2020.
- Zhexembayeva, Nadya (19 February 2020). "Stop Calling It Innovation". Harvard Business Review.
- "Titanic Syndrome: Why Companies Sink and How to Reinvent Your Way Out of Any Business Disaster". The European Financial Review. February 2018.
- "Overfished Ocean Strategy". Stanford Social Innovation Review. August 2014.
- "Overfished Ocean Strategy: Powering Up Innovation for a Resource-Deprived World". The European Financial Review. July 2014.
- "Embedded Sustainability: A Strategy for Market Leaders". The European Financial Review. April 2011.
- "Developing the Global Leaders of Tomorrow" (PDF). UN PRME Report. 2008.

== Interviews and podcasts ==
- "50 Tips to Break Out of a Career Rut and Make Your Day Job Feel Like Your Dream Job". Parade magazine. 31 August 2021.
- "What to Do When Your Boss Doesn't Advocate for You at Work". Ladders. 30 August 2021.
- "Why Reinvention, Not Change, Is The New Game In Town". Forbes. 12 March 2021.
- "Laid Off, Furloughed or Fired: Understanding the Differences". The Wall Street Journal. 24 February 2021.
- "Conversation with Nadya Zhexembayeva on reinvention, sustainability and strategy". Ambitious Radio Podcast. August 2016.
- "Conversation with Nadya Zhexembayeva on scarcity and resource intelligence". Revolutionary Provocateur Podcast. April 2015.
- "Nadya Zhexembayeva on Innovation in a Resource-Deprived World". Triple Pundit. October 2014.
- "Innovation for Positive Sustainable Development". Positivity Strategist Podcast. December 2014.
- "Overfished Ocean Strategy by Nadya Zhexembayeva". The Entrepreneurs Library with Wade Danielson. September 2014.
