= Journal of Management, Spirituality & Religion =

- Discipline: Management
- Language: English
- Edited by: Kathryn Pavlovich

Publication details
- History: 2004-present
- Publisher: International Association of Management, Spirituality & Religion
- Frequency: 6 times per year

Standard abbreviations
- ISO 4: J. Manag. Spiritual. Relig.

Indexing
- ISSN: 1476-6086 (print); 1942-258X (web)
- LCCN: 2008212548
- OCLC no.: 1065186253

Links
- Journal homepage; Manuscript submission; Online access

The Journal of Management, Spirituality & Religion (JMSR) is a peer-reviewed academic journal on management, spirituality and religion. It is published six times per year (from 2024) and contains scholarly articles regarding the spiritual and religious aspects of managing and organizing. The journal was established in 2004 and published by Routledge until January 2021. The editor-in-chief is Kathryn Pavlovich (University of Waikato).

JMSR is now published by the International Association of Management, Spirituality & Religion. The journal uses ScholarOne as its platform for manuscript submission and peer review.

Ingenta is the publishing platform.

== Abstracting and indexing ==
The journal is abstracted and indexed in:

- ATLA Religion Database
- EBSCO databases
- Emerging Sources Citation Index
- ProQuest databases
- Scopus
