= James Hoggan (public relations expert) =

James (Jim) Hoggan
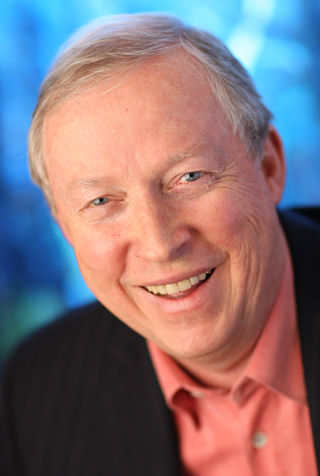
- Born: James Hoggan; October 10, 1946 (age 79)
- Education: University of Victoria
- Occupations: Author and President and CEO of Hoggan and Associates
- Years active: 1984–present
- Website: James Hoggan

James "Jim" Hoggan (born October 10, 1946) is an author and president of Hoggan and Associates, a Vancouver-based public-relations firm. He is also the co-founder of the Web site DeSmogBlog.

== Career ==
James Hoggan began his public relations career in the 1970s and is the named partner of Hoggan and Associates Ltd. He started in the industry in order to help put himself and his wife through law school at the University of Victoria. After graduation, Hoggan continued to work in the PR field focusing on publicly sensitive information. Hoggan is also the cofounder of the Stonehouse Standing Circle, a think tank. Hoggan joined the board of the David Suzuki Foundation in 2001 and became its Chair in 2009. He served in this role until November 2016. He has also served as a trustee of the Dalai Lama Center for Peace and Education and is the former chair of Climate Project Canada.

== Books ==
Hoggan is the author of three books, including the 2009 works Do the Right Thing: PR Tips for a Skeptical Public and Climate Cover-Up: The Crusade to Deny Global Warming, as well as his 2016 work I'm Right and You’re an Idiot: The Toxic State of Public Discourse and How to Clean it Up. In Climate Cover-Up, Hoggan discusses the philosophical root of climate change denial, specifically looking at the fallacies within the logic and argumentation of deniers. In response to the book, David Suzuki has stated that the efforts of deniers described by Hoggan is "tantamount to an intergenerational crime while our politicians to whom we entrust the future are criminally negligent." The book has also been referred to as a 'psychological profile' of climate change deniers. Much of the book covers the public relations efforts that have been made in support of that denial, and attempts to outline specific examples of where public corporations or other stakeholders have paid (sometimes fraudulently) to have climate change denial advertised. His work in climate-change awareness was also featured in the CBC documentary The Denial Machine.

== Recognition ==
Hoggan received a 2003 "Silver Anvil" award by the Public Relations Society of America. In 2007, Hoggan and DeSmogBlog were awarded a provincial Communication Leadership award from a local chapter of the Canadian Public Relations Society (CPRS). His blog also received a "Best Blogs of 2011" award from Time Magazine in June 2011. In 2012, Hoggan was awarded the Queen Elizabeth II Diamond Jubilee Medal.
