= Journal of Cleaner Production =

- Discipline: Environmental science
- Language: English
- Edited by: Cecília Maria Villas Bôas de Almeida, Yutao Wang

Publication details
- History: 1993–present
- Publisher: Elsevier
- Frequency: 36/year
- Impact factor: 10.7 (2025)

Standard abbreviations
- ISO 4: J. Clean. Prod.

Indexing
- ISSN: 0959-6526 (print); 1879-1786 (web)
- LCCN: 94659003
- OCLC no.: 29354752

Links
- Journal homepage

The Journal of Cleaner Production is a peer-reviewed academic journal covering transdisciplinary research on cleaner production. It is published by Elsevier. The job of editor-in-chief is shared jointly by Cecília Maria Villas Bôas de Almeida (Paulista University), and Yutao Wang (Fudan University). The former and founding editor-in-chief was Donald Huisingh (University of Tennessee).

The Journal of Cleaner Production serves as a transdisciplinary, international forum for the exchange of information and research concepts, policies, and technologies designed to help ensure progress towards making societies and regions more sustainable. It aims to encourage innovation and creativity, new and improved products, and the implementation of new, cleaner structures, systems, processes, products and services. It is also designed to stimulate the development and implementation of prevention oriented governmental policies and educational programmes.
