= David Cooperrider =

American academic and author

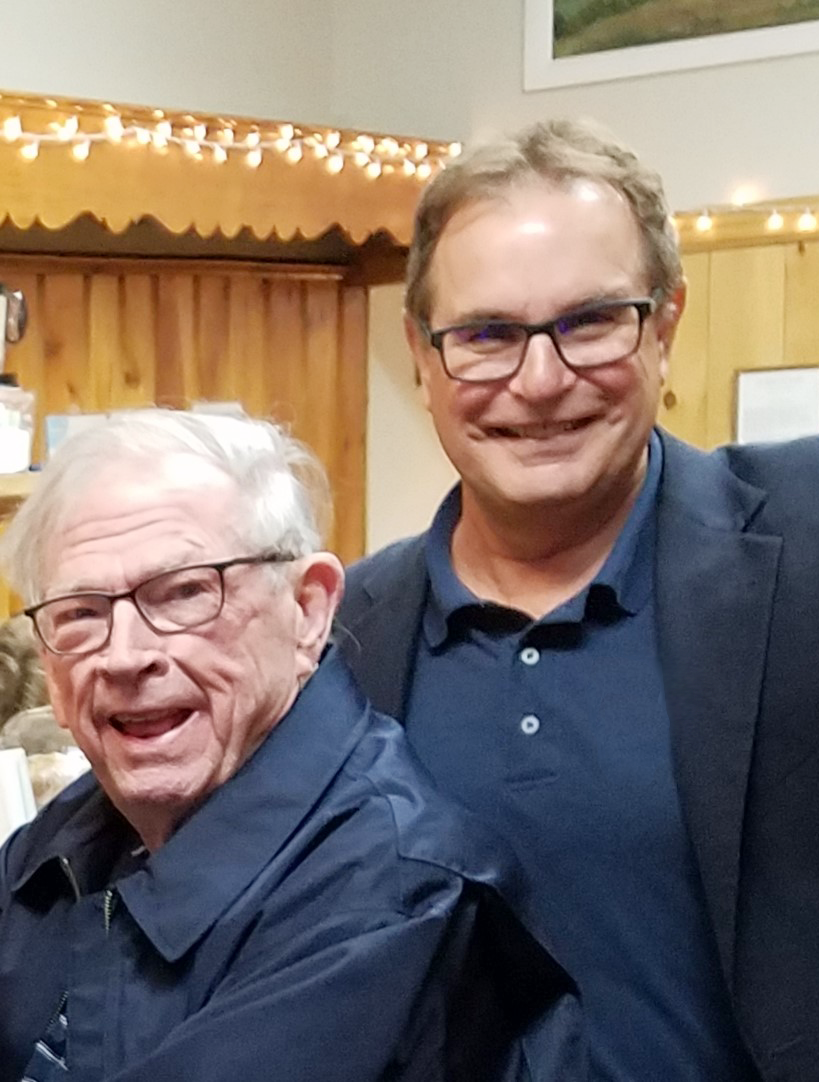
- David Cooperrider (right) with Harvard Business School Dean Emeritus John H. McArthur in 2018.
- Born: July 14, 1954 (age 72)
- Education: Case Western Reserve University (PhD)
- Occupations: Educator and author
- Years active: 1985 - Present
- Known for: Development of the theory of Appreciative Inquiry (with Suresh Srivastva)

David Cooperrider (born July 14, 1954), is the Fairmount Minerals Chair and Professor of Social Entrepreneurship at the Weatherhead School of Management at Case Western Reserve University, and Faculty Director at the Center for Business as an Agent of World Benefit at Case.

Cooperrider also teaches at University of Pennsylvania as well as Claremont University, where he is The Peter F. Drucker Distinguished Fellow.

Cooperrider is the founder, together with Suresh Srivastva, of the theory of Appreciative Inquiry.

== Early life and education ==
Cooperrider grew up in Oak Park, Illinois, and later completed his undergraduate studies at Augustana College in 1976. He earned a Master's of Science at Sir George Williams University in 1983 and his Ph.D. from Case Western Reserve University in 1985.

== Impact ==
Cooperrider's work has impacted on the fields of leadership, human development, experiential learning, and management theory. His work at Case Western Reserve University in the early 1980s on Appreciative Inquiry anticipated and helped bring about the positive psychology movement, strengths-based leadership models, and positive organizational scholarship (POS). Management scholar Robert Quinn, in a 2000 book Change the World declared that “Appreciative Inquiry is revolutionizing the field of organization development.”

In 2000, for his contribution to organizational learning and development, Cooperrider was given the "Distinguished Contribution Award to Workplace Performance and Learning" by the American Society for Training and Development.

In 2004, for his world inquiry with Ron Fry into Business as an Agent of World Benefit, the Aspen Institute gave him the “Faculty Pioneer Award for Impact” in the domain of sustainable development. That work, including his book with Jane Dutton on The Organization Dimensions of Global Change: No Limits to Cooperation, led to the creation of The Fowler Center for Sustainable Value and the ongoing global forum series hosted by Case Western Reserve University in partnership with the United Nations Global Compact and Academy of Management titled “The Global Forum for Business as an Agent of World Benefit.”

== Bibliography ==
Cooperrider has authored more than 60 articles and book chapters. His book with Diana Whitney Appreciative Inquiry: A Positive Revolution in Change was a best-seller with multiple printings. His original article on Appreciative Inquiry (with Suresh Srivastva) in 1987, appeared in the series Research in Organizational Change and Development, Vol. 1.

Cooperrider's writings include:

=== Books ===
- 1985, Appreciative Inquiry: A Methodology for Advancing Social Innovation. Phd Dissertation by David Cooperrider.
- 1990, Appreciative management and leadership: the power of positive thought in organizations coauthored with Suresh Srivastva.
- 1998, Organizational wisdom and executive courage coauthored with Suresh Srivastva.
- 1999, Appreciative Inquiry: Rethinking human organization toward a positive theory of change coauthored with Peter Sorenson, et al.
- 1999, The organizational dimensions of global change: No limits to cooperation coauthored with Jane Dutton.
- 2001, The Appreciative Organization coauthored with Harlene Anderson, et al.
- 2001, Encyclopedia of positive questions coauthored with Diana Whitney.
- 2004, Appreciative Inquiry handbook: For leaders of change coauthored with Diana Whitney and Jackie Stavros.
- 2004, Discourse and change in organizations. Volume one in Advances in Appreciative Inquiry coauthored with Michel Avital.
- 2005, Appreciative Inquiry: Foundations in positive organization development, coauthored with Peter Sorenson et al.
- 2005, Appreciative Inquiry: A positive revolution in change with Diana Whitney.
- 2007, Handbook of transformative cooperation coauthored with Sandy Piderit and Ronald Fry.
- 2007, Designing information and organizations with a positive lens (Volume Two in Advances in Appreciative Inquiry) coauthored with Michel Avital and Richard Boland.
- 2008, Essentials of Appreciative Inquiry coauthored with Diana Whitney and Jackie Stavros.
- 2010, Appreciative Inquiry and Sustainable Design (Volume Three in Advances in Appreciative Inquiry) coauthored with Tojo Thachenkery and Michel Avital.
- 2010, Developing Tomorrow's Leaders to Enact Corporate Citizenship: The Call and Opportunity for Business Schools coauthored with Ronald Fry.
- 2012, Advances in the AI Summit: Explorations into the Magic of Macro and Crowdsourcing coauthored with Lindsey Godwin et al.
- 2013, Appreciative Inquiry: An innovative approach to personal and organizational transformation with Miriam Subriana.

== Personal life ==
Cooperrider lives in Chagrin Falls, Ohio with his wife Nancy, an artist. His son Matt is a wind energy consultant, his daughter Hannah is an interior designer, and his eldest son Daniel is a minister at a United Church of Christ congregation in New England.
