= Max Wohlberg =

Hungarian-American hazzan, composer, and scholar

Max (Moshe) Wohlberg
- Born: February 9, 1907; Hungary
- Died: April 19, 1996 (aged 89); Washington, D.C., United States
- Occupation(s): Hazzan; composer; scholar
- Known for: Founding member and president of the Cantors Assembly; founder of the cantorial school at the Jewish Theological Seminary; influential teacher of nusach

Max (Moshe) Wohlberg (February 9, 1907 - April 19, 1996) was a Hungarian-American hazzan, composer, and scholar. He was one of the initial members of the Cantors Assembly established in 1947 and served as its president from 1949 to 1951. He helped to found the cantorial school at the Jewish Theological Seminary where he was Professor and head of the nusach department. Self-taught, he developed a curriculum for studying nusach and producing scholarly research, educating over 100 graduates as of 1977.

Wohlberg was known for his recitative compositions and recognized as a melodist who captured the interpretive nuances of liturgical texts. His music was rooted in Jewish liturgical traditions, incorporating biblical cantillations, synagogue motifs, Yiddish song phrases, and Israeli folk melodies. These influences stemmed from his extensive exposure to Jewish musical life and were further enriched by his teaching and research.

Wohlberg died April 19, 1996, in Washington D.C.
