= Zalman Schachter-Shalomi =

American Rabbi, writer, and activist

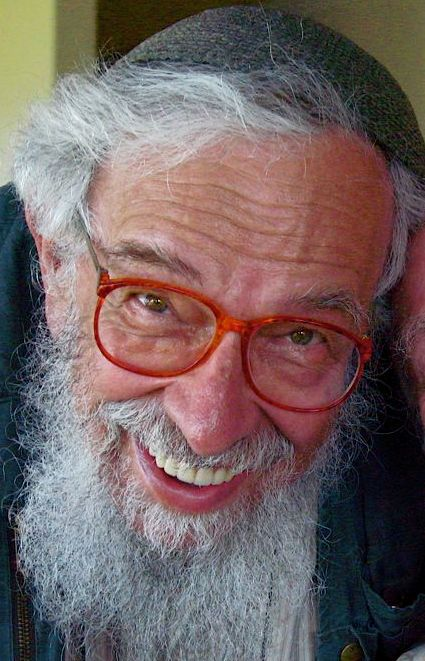
- Schachter-Shalomi in 2008
- Born: Meshullam Zalman Schachter; August 17, 1924; Żółkiew, Poland (later Zhovkva, Ukraine)
- Died: July 3, 2014 (aged 89); Boulder, Colorado, United States
- Education: Central Lubavitch Yeshiva (Tomchei Temimim) (Semikhah); Boston University (M.A.); Hebrew Union College (Doctor of Hebrew Letters)
- Occupations: Rabbi, teacher

Meshullam Zalman Schachter-Shalomi (August 17, (Note: or August 28) 1924 – July 3, 2014; Hebrew: משולם זלמן שכטר-שלומי), commonly referred to as Reb Zalman (Yiddish: רב זלמן), was an American rabbi, writer, and activist, and one of the founders of the Jewish Renewal movement and an innovator in ecumenical dialogue.

Born in Poland, Schachter-Shalomi was raised an Orthodox Jew in a variety of countries as his family repeatedly moved to evade increasing antisemitism in 1930s Europe. While awaiting a visa to the United States in an internment camp in Vichy France, Schachter-Shalomi met Menachem Mendel Schneerson, who later became the seventh Chabad Rebbe. Becoming a Chabad rabbi in 1947, Schachter-Shalomi took a deep interest in the spiritual practices of other faiths and immersed himself in the counter-culture of the 1960s. Eventually expelled from Chabad, he founded his own organization, B'Nai Or (later P'Nai Or), and his attempts to innovate in Jewish prayer helped pioneer what became the chavurah and Jewish Renewal movements.

Employed as an academic in his later years, Schachter-Shalomi continued to work in interfaith dialogue and spreading hasidut, and in the 1990s was part of a group of four rabbis who travelled to Dharamsala, India, to advise the Dalai Lama on how to retain religious traditions in exile and prevent assimilation. A prolific author, Schachter-Shalomi published dozens of books on many topics, including hasidut, ecstatic prayer, contemplative spirituality, environmental consciousness, and spiritual direction. Schachter-Shalomi died in 2014 and is buried in Boulder, Colorado. He was married four times and had eleven children.

== Early life ==
Born Meshullam Zalman Schachter in 1924 to Shlomo and Hayyah Gittel Schachter in Żółkiew, in the Second Polish Republic (now Zhovkva, Ukraine), Schachter spent his early years in Vienna, Austria. His father was a liberal Belzer hasid and had Zalman educated at both a Zionist high school and an Orthodox yeshiva.

He and his family fled Austria after Nazi Germany annexed it in 1938 and later were interned in a detention camp under the Nazi's puppet government in Vichy France before moving to the United States in 1941. In 1947 he was ordained as a rabbi by the Chabad hasidic movement.

== Career and work ==
=== Chabad rabbi ===
In 1948, along with Rabbi Shlomo Carlebach, Schachter was sent out to speak on college campuses by the now Lubavitcher Rebbe Menachem Mendel Schneerson as one of the first shluḥim ([/ʃluˈχim/]; שְׁלוּחִים, 'emissaries [to Jewish communities]'; sing. shaliaḥ). In 1958, Schachter privately published what may have been the first English book on Jewish meditation. It was later reprinted in The Jewish Catalog and read by a generation of Jews and some Christian contemplatives. Schachter left the Lubavitcher movement in 1962 after experimenting with "the sacramental value of lysergic acid" (LSD). which he was given by Timothy Leary. With the subsequent rise of the hippie movement in the 1960s, and exposure to Christian mysticism, he moved away from the Chabad lifestyle.

=== Hillel director and ecumenical work ===
From 1956 to 1975 he was based in Winnipeg, Manitoba, though he travelled extensively. In Winnipeg, he worked as the Hillel director and head of the Judaic studies program at the University of Manitoba. These positions allowed him to share his ideas and experiential techniques of spirituality with many Jewish and non-Jewish students, which would be influential in his later work. While pursuing a course of study at Boston University (including a class taught by Howard Thurman), he experienced an intellectual and spiritual shift. In 1968, on sabbatical from the religion department of the University of Manitoba, he joined a group of other Jews in founding a ḥavurah—small cooperative Jewish congregation—in Somerville, Massachusetts, called Havurat Shalom (lit. 'Fellowship [of] Peace').

In the 1980s, Schachter added "Shalomi" (שְׁלוֹמִי, 'my peace'; from the Hebrew שָׁלוֹם, shalom, 'peace') to his name as a statement of his desire for peace in Israel and around the world.

=== Later years and death ===
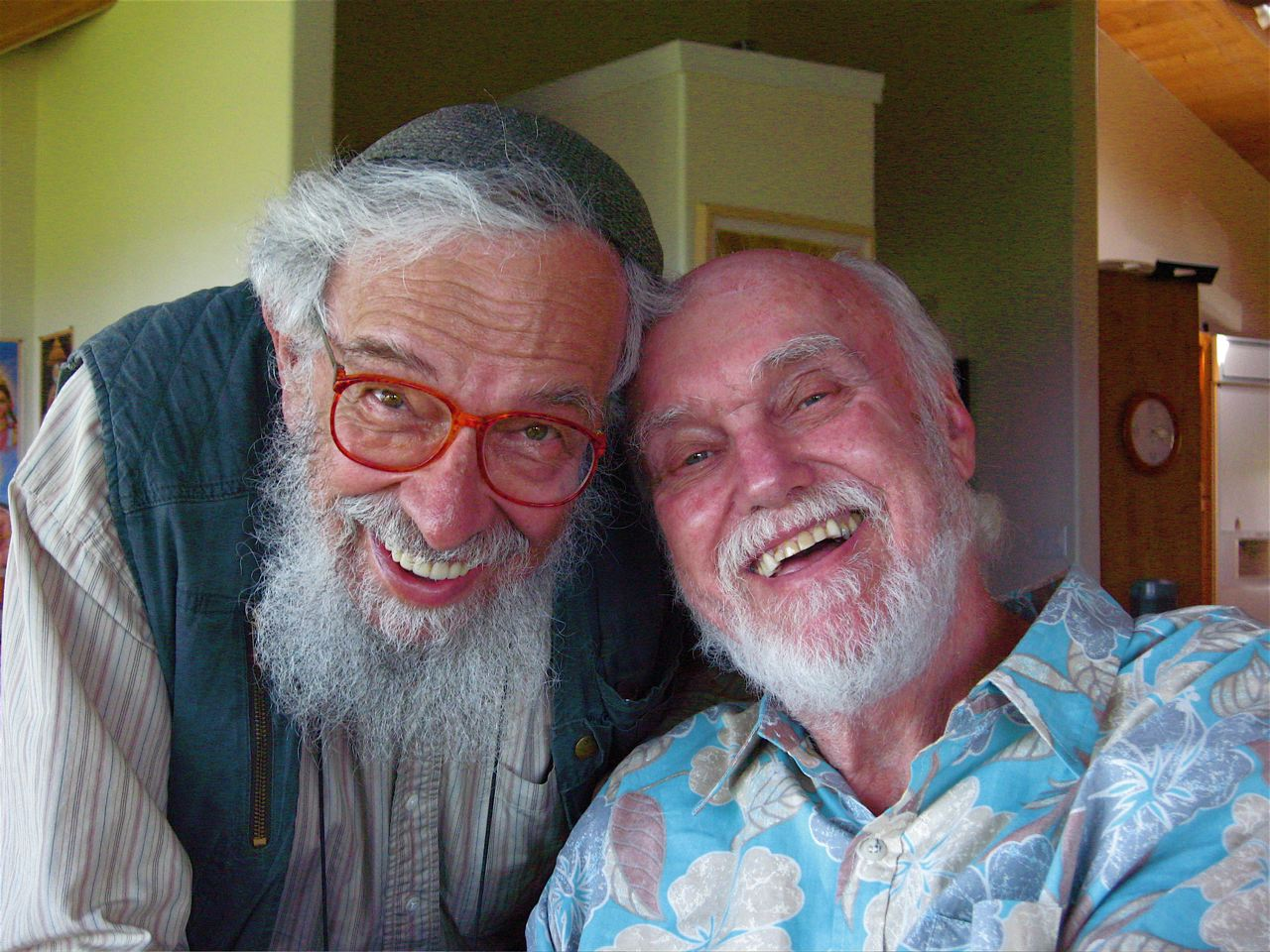
Zalman Schachter-Shalomi and Ram Dass in February 2008

Schachter-Shalomi was among the group of rabbis, from a wide range of Jewish denominations, who traveled together to India to meet with the Dalai Lama and discuss diaspora survival for Jews and Tibetan Buddhists with him.

In his later years, Schachter-Shalomi held the World Wisdom Chair at The Naropa Institute; he was professor emeritus at both Naropa and Temple University. He also served on the faculty of the Reconstructionist Rabbinical College. He was co-founder, with Rabbi Arthur Waskow, of ALEPH: Alliance for Jewish Renewal, bringing together P'nai Or and The Shalom Center. He was also the founder of the ALEPH ordination programs.

Schachter-Shalomi died of complications from pneumonia in 2014 at the age of 89. Schachter-Shalomi was married four times and was the father of 11 children.

== Work ==
He was committed to the Gaia hypothesis, to feminism, and to full inclusion of LGBT people within Judaism. His innovations in Jewish worship include chanting prayers in English while retaining the traditional Hebrew structures and melodies, engaging davenners (worshipers) in theological dialogue, leading meditation during services.

His major academic work, Spiritual Intimacy: A Study of Counseling in Hasidism, was the result of his doctoral research into the system of spiritual direction cultivated within Chabad Hasidism.

== Honors ==
In 2012 his book Davening: A Guide to Meaningful Jewish Prayer won the Contemporary Jewish Life and Practice Award (one of the National Jewish Book Awards).

He was also recognized as a shaikh in the Sufi Order of Pir Vilayat Khan in the United States and in the Holy Land.

In 2012, the Unitarian Universalist Starr King School for the Ministry awarded Schachter-Shalomi an honorary doctorate of theology, and he gave a popular series of lectures on the "Emerging Cosmology".

== Bibliography ==
- Zalman Schachter-Shalomi (1975). Philip Mandelkorn; Stephen Gerstman (eds.). Fragments of a Future Scroll: Ḥassidism for the Aquarian Age. Leaves of Grass Press. ISBN 978-0-915070-00-8.
- Zalman Schachter-Shalomi; Donald Gropman (1983). The First Step: A Guide for the New Jewish Spirit. Bantam Books. ISBN 978-0-553-01418-1.
- Howard Schwartz; Zalman Schachter-Shalomi (1989). The Dream Assembly: Tales of Rabbi Zalman Schachter-Shalomi. Gateways/IDHHB. ISBN 978-0-89556-059-9.
- Zalman Schachter-Shalomi (1991). Spiritual Intimacy: A Study of Counseling in Hasidism. Jason Aronson. ISBN 978-0-87668-772-7.
- Ellen Singer, ed. (1993). Paradigm Shift: From the Jewish Renewal Teachings of Reb Zalman Schachter-Shalomi. Jason Aronson. ISBN 978-0-87668-543-3.
- Schachter-Shalomi, Zalman; Miller, Ronald S. (1995). From Age-ing to Sage-ing. New York: Grand Central Pub. ISBN 0-446-51776-3.
- Zalman Schachter-Shalomi; Nataniel M. Miles-Yepez (2003). Wrapped in a holy flame: teachings and tales of the Hasidic masters. Jossey-Bass, a Wiley Imprint. ISBN 978-0-7879-6573-0.
- Zalman Schachter-Shalomi; Daniel Siegel (2005). Credo of a Modern Kabbalist. Trafford Publishing. ISBN 978-1-4120-6107-0.
- Zalman Schachter-Shalomi; Joel Segel (2005). Jewish with Feeling: A Guide to Meaningful Jewish Practice. Riverhead Books. ISBN 978-1-57322-280-8.
- Zalman Schachter-Shalomi; Daniel Siegel (2007). Integral Halachah: Transcending and Including Jewish Practice Through the Lens of Personal Transformation and Global Consciousness. Trafford Publishing. ISBN 978-1-4251-2698-8.
- Zalman Schachter-Shalomi; Ronald S. Miller (2008). From Age-ing to Sage-ing: A Revolutionary Approach to Growing Older. Grand Central Publishing. ISBN 978-0-446-55373-5.
- Zalman Schachter-Shalomi; Yair Hillel Goelman (2009). Ahron's Heart: The Prayers, Teachings and Letters of Ahrele Roth, a Hasidic Reformer. Ben Yehuda Press. ISBN 978-1-934730-18-8.
- Zalman Schachter-Shalomi (2011). Michael L. Kagan (ed.). All Breathing Life Adores Your Name: At the Interface Between Poetry and Prayer : Translations and Compositions of Jewish Sacred Literature. Gaon Books. ISBN 978-1-935604-21-1.
- Schachter-Shalomi, Zalman; Hoffman, Edward (2012). My Life in Jewish Renewal. Lanham: Rowman & Littlefield Pub Incorporated. ISBN 1-4422-1327-2.
- Zalman Schachter-Shalomi (2013). Netanel Miles-Yépez; Robert Micha'el Esformes (eds.). Gate to the Heart: A Manual of Contemplative Jewish Practice. Albion-Andalus. ISBN 978-0-615-94456-2.
- Nahman of Bratzlav (2013). Tikkun Klali: Rebbe Nahman of Bratzlav's Ten Remedies for the Soul. Translated by Schachter-Shalomi, Zalman. Albion-Andalus Books. ISBN 978-0-615-75876-3.
- Sara Davidson (2014). The December Project: An Extraordinary Rabbi and a Skeptical Seeker Confront Life's Greatest Mystery. HarperOne. ISBN 978-0-06-228176-0.
- Zalman Schachter-Shalomi; Netanel Miles-Yepez (2017). A Heart Afire: Stories and Teachings of the Early Hasidic Masters. Monkfish Book Publishing. ISBN 978-1-939681-62-1.
