= Dalai Lama Center for Peace and Education =

International charitable organization in Vancouver, Canada

- Formation: 2005
- Location: Vancouver, British Columbia, Canada
- Website: Official website

The Dalai Lama Center for Peace and Education is an international charitable organization and education center in Vancouver, British Columbia, Canada. Established in 2005, the center's mission is to "educate the hearts of children by informing, inspiring, and engaging the communities around them."

The organization is advised by several prominent leaders involved in peace-making and has organized events centered on discussions of spirituality, climate change, the environment, peace, and other topics.

== History and mission ==
The 14th Dalai Lama's ties with Vancouver, Canada, date from the early 1960s when Vancouver-based writer George Woodcock traveled to India to support Tibetan exiles and met the Dalai Lama. Over the years, the Dalai Lama visited Vancouver several times in 1980, 1993, 2004, 2006, and 2009. The Dalai Lama's brother, Tendzin Choegyal, also has close ties with the city, having traveled there often to give speeches and teach.

Victor Chan, a 30-year friend of the Dalai Lama, is the center's founding director. Chan co-authored the 2013 book The Wisdom of Compassion: Stories of Remarkable Encounters and Timeless Insights with the Dalai Lama. According to the Dalai Lama, Vancouver was chosen as the center's location because its "multiethnic and multiracial population gives it harmony."

The center was formally inaugurated in September 2006 in Vancouver. The Dalai Lama, in attendance at the event, was awarded honorary Canadian citizenship by the Canadian government. Also attending the inauguration were Tim Shriver, Deepak Chopra, and Sonja Lyubomirsky, with James Hoggan & Associates providing public relations services for the event. Given that the Dalai Lama was visiting a major city such as Vancouver, event organizers elected to widen the scope of his visit to the city and expand the audience for the Vancouver Dialogues by streaming sessions live over the internet to broadcast to an international audience.

The center originally intended to have a permanent facility constructed by 2009. In a 2006 interview with the Vancouver Sun, Chan explained that the center's facility would be 4,645 square meters and include an outdoor European-style piazza, Zen garden, bookstore, film-screening theater, performing arts theater, art gallery, library, and studios for classes or group discussions. Chan stated that the facility would highlight the Dalai Lama's international connections, invite guest speakers, host interfaith dialogues, and discuss peaceful resolutions to conflicts. Chan added that half of the center's $60 million budget would go to operating costs, research, local programming, and an endowment, and the rest towards construction of the facility and a meditative retreat. As of March 2010, however, the center's website indicated that the organization had yet to construct a physical facility.

In a press release, the organization stated that its goals were to:

Reach out and be open to all people, regardless of faith, culture or political affiliation. It will work to strengthen the bonds of human connection among all peoples and to share knowledge and explore principles that encourage people to live well together. The Center will translate the Dalai Lama's teachings on kindness, compassion and interconnectedness into programs directed at creating a more just and harmonious world.

The Center added that it hopes to achieve this goal by promoting human values and stressing a sense of oneness with humanity.

== Governance ==
The Center has an international advisory board which is chaired by the Dalai Lama and includes:

- Betty Williams
- Desmond Tutu
- Jimmy Carter
- Jody Williams
- Kim Campbell
- Mairead Maguire
- Sakyong Mipham
- Rigoberta Menchú Tum
- Shirin Ebadi
- Tendzin Choegyal

The Center is overseen by six trustees, including:

- Victor Chan
- Maureen Dockendor
- Mary McNeil
- Stephanie Korour
- Gloria Macarenko

== Notable events ==
In October 2006, the Center hosted an invitation-only discussion group with economist John Helliwell and neurophysiologist Richard Davidson. The discussion centered on happiness.

=== Vancouver Peace Summit ===
In September 2009, the Center sponsored an event called "The Vancouver Peace Summit". In various dialogues, including "World Peace through Personal Peace", "Nobel Laureates in Dialogue", and "Educating the Heart", speakers discussed spirituality, science, psychotherapy, the arts, business, and education. In attendance at the Summit were the Dalai Lama, Maria Shriver, Matthieu Ricard, Mary Robinson, Eckhart Tolle, Stephen Covey, Mairead Maguire, Betty Williams, Jody Williams, Murray Gell-Mann, and the Blue Man Group. The event was held at the Chan Centre for the Performing Arts and the Orpheum and was attended by 5,000 people.

=== Be the Village. Dialogues with the Dalai Lama. Vancouver 2014 ===
The Dalai Lama returned to Vancouver in October 2014 to take part in a panel discussion with Kimberly Schonert-Reichl, Tamara Vrooman, and Janet Austin, with special guest Peter Senge. The focus of the discussion was the advancement of heart-mind well-being in children and youth.
