= List of years in Mandatory Palestine =

This is a list of years in Mandatory Palestine.

== Mandatory Palestine (1920–1948) ==
1940s
1940
1941
1942
1943
1944
1945
1946
1947
1948

1930s
1930
1931
1932
1933
1934
1935
1936
1937
1938
1939

1920s
1920
1921
1922
1923
1924
1925
1926
1927
1928
1929

== British-administered Palestine (pre-Mandate) (1918–1920) ==
1920s
1920

1910s
1918
1919

== See also ==
- Timeline of Israeli history
- Timeline of the region of Palestine
- List of years in Israel
- List of years in Palestine
