= 2007 in Israel =

- Decades: 1980s; 1990s; 2000s; 2010s; 2020s
- See also: History of Israel; Timeline of Israeli history; List of years in Israel

The following events occurred in the year 2007 in Israel.

== Incumbents ==
- President of Israel – Moshe Katsav to July 1, Dalia Itzik, acting president January 25 to July 15, Shimon Peres from July 15
- Prime Minister of Israel – Ehud Olmert (Kadima)
- President of the Supreme Court – Dorit Beinisch
- Chief of General Staff – Dan Halutz to February 14, Gabi Ashkenazi
- Government of Israel – 31st Government of Israel

== Events ==
- January 17 – Lieutenant-General Dan Halutz, the Chief of Staff of the Israeli Army, resigns while inquiries into the performance of the Israel Defense Forces in the action against Hezbollah continue.
- January 19 – Moshe Katsav, president of the State of Israel takes a leave of absence. Dalia Itzik is appointed as acting president.
- January 23 – Attorney-General Meni Mazuz announces that he would consider charging President Katsav with rape, sexual harassment, breach of trust, obstruction of justice, harassment of a witness and fraud.
- January 24 – President Katsav holds a press conference broadcast live on Israeli news broadcasts in which he accuses journalists of persecuting him and judging him before all the evidence has been presented and before actually being convicted. In addition, he also accuses the police, who he claims did everything to prove that he is guilty.
- January 28 – Raleb Majadele, Israeli Arab politician, becomes Israel's first Muslim minister when appointed Minister without portfolio. In March 2007 Majadle received the Science, Culture and Sport portfolio.
- February 14 – Gabi Ashkenazi is appointed as the 19th Chief of Staff of the Israel Defense Forces.
- April 22 – Avraham Hirschson, the Finance Minister of Israel, stands down for three months while the Israeli police investigate a claim that he failed to report an embezzlement case when he was working for a trade union.
- April 30 – Israeli PM Ehud Olmert is criticised by the Winograd Commission for taking Israel to war in Lebanon last year "hastily".
- May 3 – Tens of thousands of Israeli protesters at Rabin Square in Tel Aviv call for Prime Minister Ehud Olmert and his government to resign over their mishandling of the 2006 Lebanon war.
- 10 May – The group Teapacks represents Israel at the Eurovision Song Contest with the song “Kaftor Adom” ("Push the Button"), reaching the semi-final round.
- June 11 – The Israeli reconnaissance satellite Ofek-7 is launched.
- June 13 – In the 2007 Presidential Election, the Knesset elects Shimon Peres as the ninth president of the State of Israel, by a second-round vote of 86 for and 23 against, following the withdrawal in his favour of the other two candidates. In the first round, Peres had failed to obtain an absolute majority in the 120-member Knesset receiving 58 votes, against 38 for Reuven Rivlin and 21 for Colette Avital. (Peres does not assume office until July 15.)
- June 28 – President Katsav's lawyers reach a controversial plea bargain with Israel's attorney general, Menachem Mazuz. According to the deal, Katsav would plead guilty to several counts of sexual harassment and indecent acts and receive a suspended jail sentence, and pay compensation to two of his victims. The more serious rape charges brought by the initial employee, A., have been dropped, as well as Katsav's original charges of her blackmailing him.
- July 1 – Moshe Katsav resigns as president of the State of Israel. Dalia Itzik continues as acting president.
- July 1 – Avraham Hirschson resigns as the Finance Minister of Israel as an investigation into alleged fraud and embezzlement continues.
- July 15 – Shimon Peres assumes office as the ninth president of the State of Israel.
- July 18 – The Knesset decides to extend the Tal Law in another five years, until 2012.
- September 6 – Operation Orchard: Israeli Air Force destroys a suspected nuclear reactor in the Deir ez-Zor region of Syria which was built with the assistance of North Korea.
- October 10 – Israeli teachers' association begins the longest lasting strike in Israel's education system history. The strike ended after 64 days.
- October 16 – The full length of Highway 471 opens to the public
- November 23 – An Israeli psychiatrist and reserve officer is charged with giving classified information to Iran, Russia and Hamas.
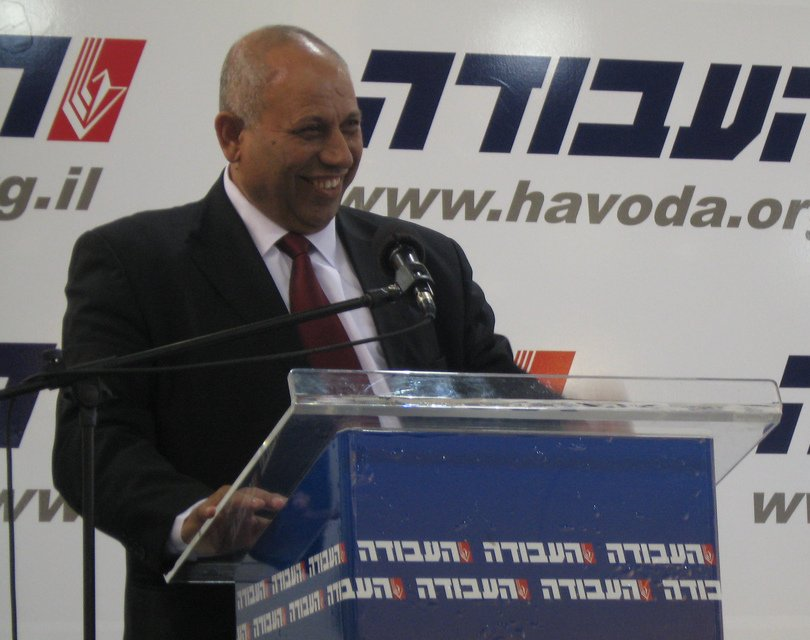
Raleb Majadele becomes the first Israeli Arab Muslim to serve as a cabinet minister in the government of Israel

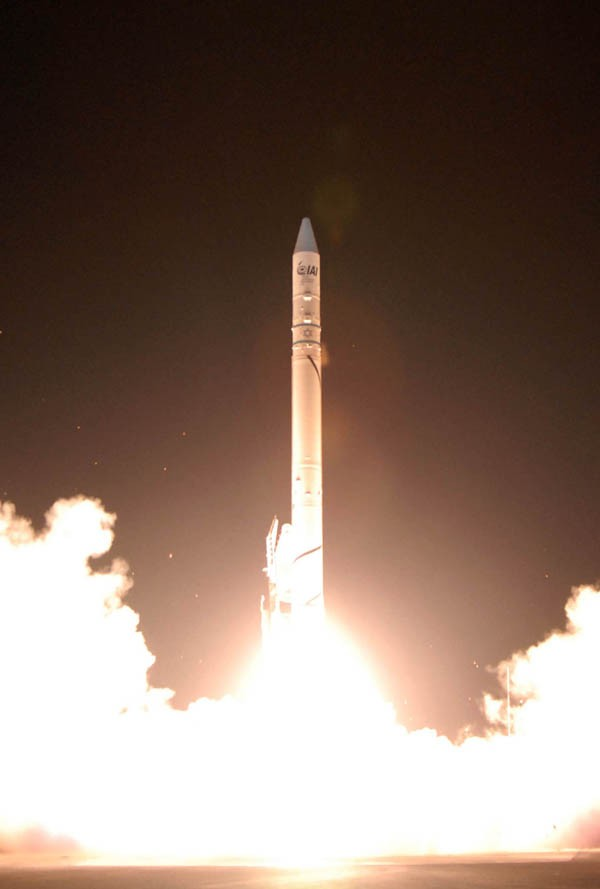
The Israeli reconnaissance satellite Ofek-7 is launched, June 11, 2007

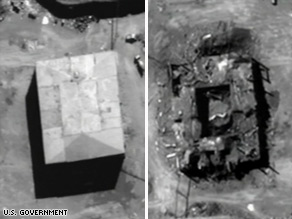
Operation Orchard – Before and after photo of target

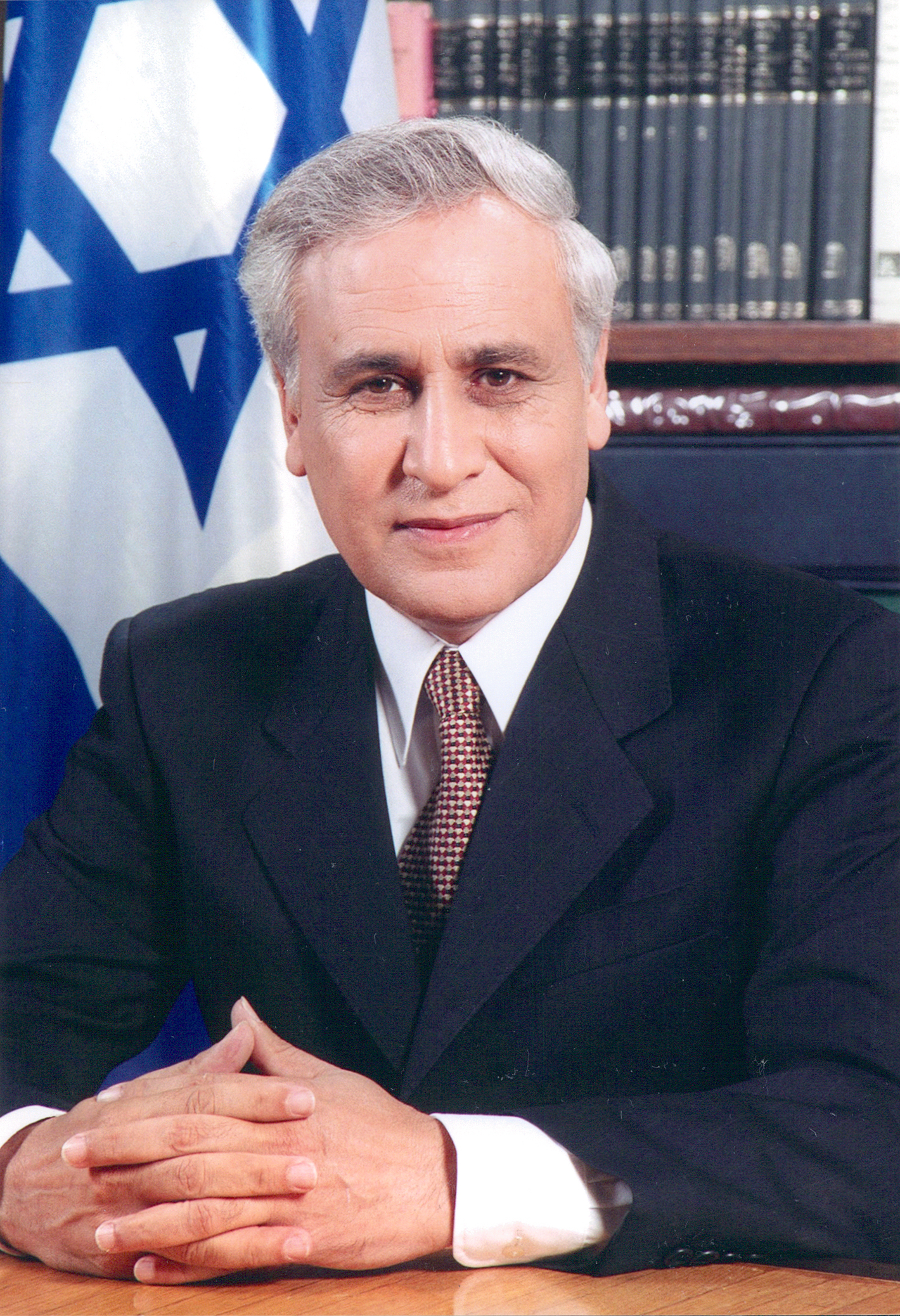
President Moshe Katsav, resigned as president while facing serious criminal charges

=== Israeli–Palestinian conflict ===
The most prominent events related to the Israeli–Palestinian conflict which occurred during 2007 include:

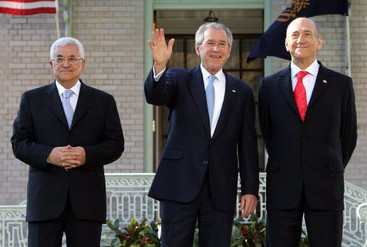
Israel participates in the Annapolis Conference, November 27, 2007

- January 19 – Israel releases $100 million in frozen assets to Chairman Mahmoud Abbas of the Palestinian National Authority, in order to bolster Abbas's position and keep money out of the hands of the Hamas government.
- June 7–15 – Battle of Gaza: Hamas takes control of the entire Gaza Strip after numerous gun battles, and establishes a separate government while Fatah remains in control of the West Bank. This in practice divides the area administered by the Palestinian Authority into two. Chairman Mahmoud Abbas and the more moderate Fatah party advocate a Palestinian Arab state alongside Israel, while Prime Minister Ismail Haniyeh and the Islamist Hamas party reject Israel's right to exist.
- June 25 – Prime Minister of Israel Ehud Olmert meets with Middle East leaders President of Egypt Hosni Mubarak, President of the Palestinian Authority Mahmoud Abbas and King Abdullah II of Jordan in a summit in Sharm el-Sheikh aimed at boosting Abbas' leadership of the Palestinian Authority and isolating Hamas after their takeover of Gaza. Olmert announces that he will release 250 Palestinian political prisoners as a gesture of goodwill.
- July 20 – Israel has begun releasing 250 Palestinian Arab prisoners associated with Fatah as a goodwill gesture to the Chairman of the Palestinian National Authority, Mahmoud Abbas.
- August 6 – Israeli Prime Minister Ehud Olmert arrives in the historic town of Jericho, administered by the Palestinian Authority, becoming the first Prime Minister of Israel to visit the West Bank or Gaza Strip in more than seven years. Olmert meets with Mahmoud Abbas, Chairman of the Palestinian National Authority.
- November 19 – Israel releases 450 Palestinian Arab prisoners as a goodwill gesture to the Chairman of the Palestinian National Authority, Mahmoud Abbas, ahead of the 2007 Mideast peace conference with the Palestinian Authority.
- November 27 – The Annapolis Conference is held in Annapolis, the capital of the US state of Maryland. The conference marks the first time a two-state solution is articulated as the mutually agreed-upon outline for addressing the Israeli–Palestinian conflict. The conference ends with the issuing of a joint statement from all parties.

Notable Palestinian militant operations against Israeli targets

The most prominent Palestinian militant acts and operations committed against Israeli targets during 2007 include:

- January 29 – Eilat bakery bombing: A Palestinian Arab suicide bomber from the Gaza Strip infiltrates the northern suburbs of Eilat, Israel. Provoked by approaching police, enters and attacks a neighbourhood bakery, killing the three men employed there – all Israeli Jews.
- May 2 – Hamas and Islamic Jihad launch at least 18 rockets into Israel, damaging a road, hitting a car in a commercial center of Sderot, killing an Israeli woman and lightly wounding 2 others.
- May 21 – A man is killed in Sderot after a rocket landed near the car in which he was sitting.
- September 10 – Two Qassam rockets are fired from Beit Hanun at the Zikim Army Base in Israel located near the Gaza Border. One of them lands safely in the Negev, but the other lands near unfortified barracks (Zikim military base) at the base where Israeli recruits were sleeping. This resulted in at least 66 wounded, with at least 10 moderately to seriously. 69 soldiers were wounded by the rocket, 60+ of them had only light-to moderate shrapnel wounds, but four of them were injured seriously. One of the four had to have his leg amputated, and another was in a critical condition. Both Islamic Jihad and PRC claimed responsibility.

Notable Israeli military operations against Palestinian militancy targets

The most prominent Israeli military counter-terrorism operations (military campaigns and military operations) carried out against Palestinian militants during 2007 include:

- April 7 – Israeli helicopters fire at least two missiles into the northern Gaza Strip. The missile killed a Palestinian militant "while mounting an operation near the border" in a statement released by Islamic Jihad.
- May 17 – Gaza–Israel conflict: An Israeli aircraft bombs a building of the Hamas-run Executive Force in Gaza, killing at least one person and injuring about 45 others.
- May 20 – Gaza–Israel conflict: An IAF plane fires a missile at house of Hamas lawmaker Khalil al-Haya, killing eight people (6 of whom were civilians) and wounding many others; Al-Haya was not at his house at the time of the strike.

== Notable deaths ==
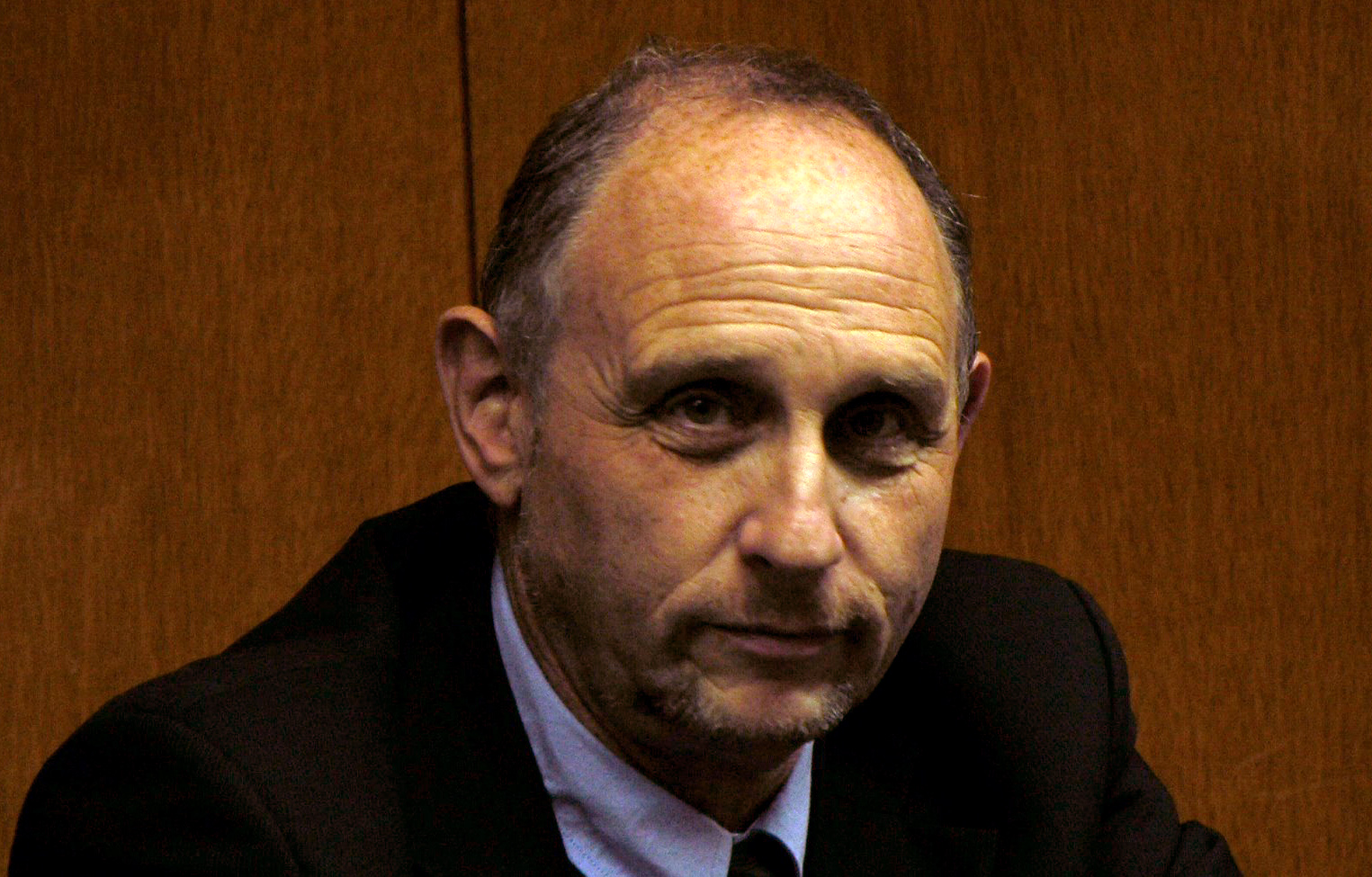
Yuri Stern

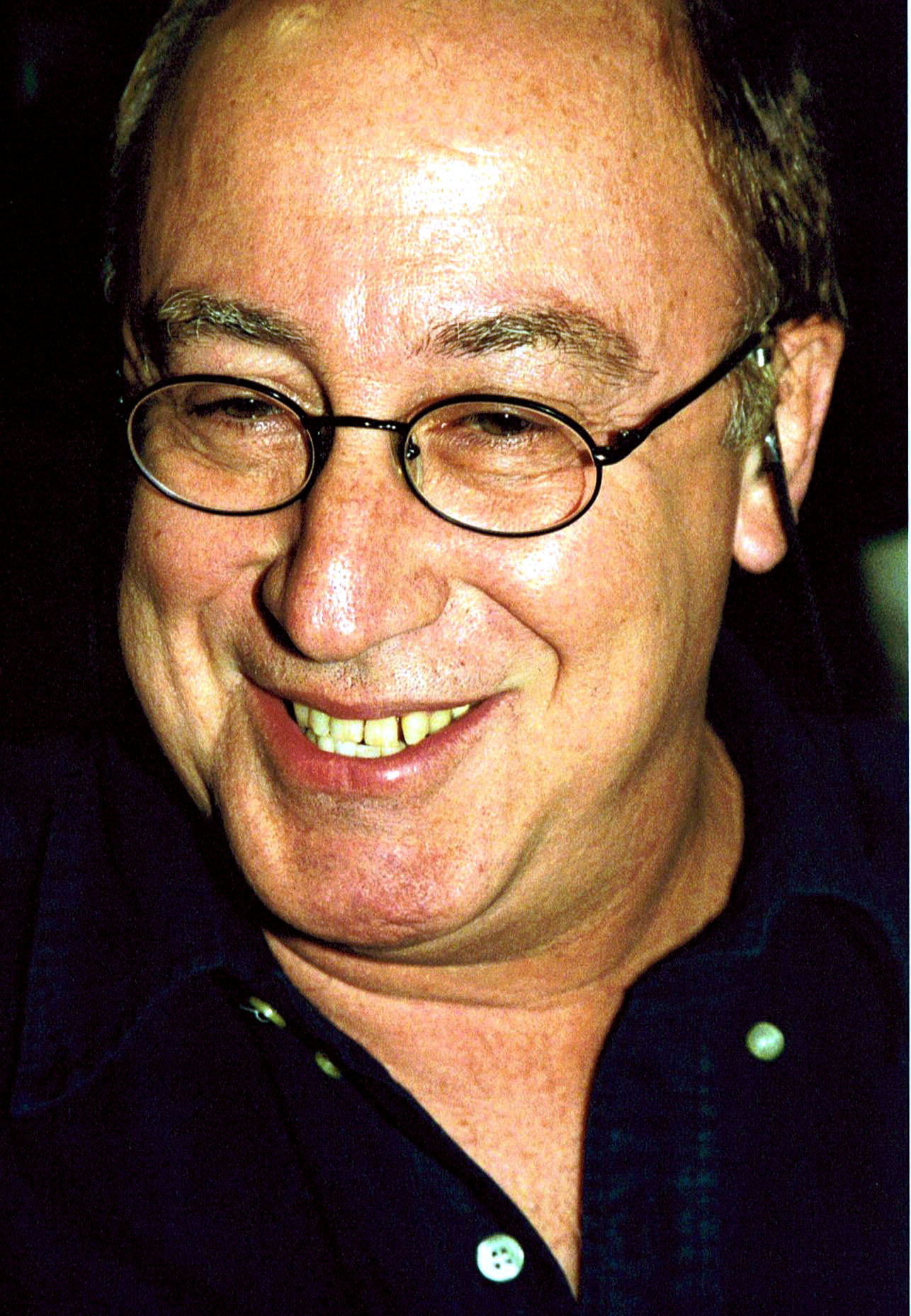
Yisrael Poliakov

- January 2 – Teddy Kollek (born 1911), Hungarian-born Israeli Mayor of Jerusalem (1965–1993) – natural causes.
- January 16 – Yuri Stern (born 1949), Russian-born Israeli politician – cancer.
- February 24 – Mordechai Breuer (born 1921), German-born Israeli Bible researcher and orthodox rabbi.
- March 17 – Tanya Reinhart (born 1943), Israeli linguist and peace activist – stroke.
- March 19 – Shimon Tzabar (born 1926), Israeli artist, author, poet and former Haaretz columnist – pneumonia.
- April 20 – Yehuda Meir Abramowicz (born 1914), Russian (Poland)-born Israeli General Secretary of Agudat Israel (1972–1981).
- May 7 – Raffi Lavie (born 1937), Israeli artist – pancreatic cancer.
- May 20 – Baruch Kimmerling (born 1939), Romanian-born Israeli sociologist and historian – cancer.
- June 19 – Ze'ev Schiff (born 1932), French-born Israeli military journalist – heart disease.
- July 8 – Itzik Kol (born 1932), Israeli film producer – pneumonia.
- August 5 – Amos Manor (born 1918), Romanian-born Israeli head of Shin Bet (1953–1963).
- August 27 – Gad Yaacobi (born 1935), Israeli former minister and Labor Party Knesset member – heart failure.
- September 27 – Israel Segal (born 1944), Israeli writer and journalist – heart failure.
- September 27 – Avraham Shapira (born 1914), Israeli rabbi, Ashkenazi chief rabbi of Israel (1983–1993).
- October 30 – Yisrael Poliakov (born 1941), Israeli actor, member of comedy group HaGashash HaHiver – cancer.
- December 21 – Saadia Marciano (born 1950), Moroccan-born Israeli Black Panthers leader, member of the Knesset.

== See also ==
- 2007 in Israeli film
- Israel in the Eurovision Song Contest 2007
- 2007 in the Palestinian territories
