= 1944 in Mandatory Palestine =

- 1944 in the British Mandate of Palestine
«««
1943
1942
1941
»»»
1945
1946
1947
See also:
1944 in the United Kingdom
Other events of 1944

Events in the year 1944 in the British Mandate of Palestine.

== Incumbents ==
- High Commissioner – Sir Harold MacMichael until 30 August; John Vereker, 6th Viscount Gort
- Emir of Transjordan – Abdullah I bin al-Hussein
- Prime Minister of Transjordan – Tawfik Abu al-Huda until 15 October; Samir al-Rifai

== Events ==
- 1 February – The Irgun proclaims a revolt against the British mandatory government.
- 27 February – The Irgun bombs the income tax offices.
- 15 March – World War II: Hannah Szenes and two male colleagues are parachuted by the British into Yugoslavia and join a partisan group.
- 1 August – Fourth Assembly of Jewish Representatives elections held.
- 8 August – Lehi members attempt to assassinate the High Commissioner, Sir Harold MacMichael.
- 30 August – Sir John Vereker, 6th Viscount Gort assumes office as the High Commissioner of Palestine.
- 20 September – World War II: The Jewish Brigade group of the British Army is established.
- 19 October – Irgun and Lehi members are deported by the Mandate authorities to internment camps in Africa.
- November – The founding of the city Giv'at Shmuel.
- 6 November – Lord Moyne, the British minister of state in the Middle East, is assassinated by Lehi members in Cairo.

== Births ==
- 6 January – Yair Rosenblum, Israeli composer (died 1996).
- 9 February – Ze'ev Seltzer, Israeli footballer and football manager.
- 10 February – Assad Assad, Druze Israeli politician, diplomat, and military officer.
- 16 February – Gaby Mazor, Israeli archaeologist.
- 20 February – Yaakov Peri, Israeli politician and director of Shin Bet.
- 6 March – Michael Eitan, Israeli politician (died 2024).
- 18 March – Amnon Lipkin-Shahak, 15th Chief of Staff of the IDF (died 2012).
- 19 March – Sirhan Sirhan, Palestinian-Jordanian assassin of Robert F. Kennedy.
- 4 April – Yehudit Naot, Israeli scientist and politician (died 2004).
- 4 April – Alex Odeh, Palestinian Christian and Arab-American activist (died 1985).
- 9 April – Leila Khaled, Palestinian activist, member of the Popular Front for the Liberation of Palestine (PFLP) who is best known for hijacking airplanes.
- 7 April – Oshik Levi, Israeli singer and actor.
- 19 April – Yehuda Weinstein, Israeli lawyer, Attorney General of Israel .
- 20 May – Matan Vilnai, Israeli politician and former Major General in the IDF.
- 26 May – Israel Segal, Israeli writer and journalist (died 2007).
- 29 May – Avraham Melamed, Israeli swimmer, competed at the 1964 Summer Olympics and 1968 Summer Olympics, won two silver medals in the 1966 Asian Games.
- 10 June – Yona Wallach, Israeli poet (died 1985).
- 16 June – Avigdor Kahalani, former Israeli politician and former Brigadier General in the IDF.
- 19 June – Yona Yahav, Israeli lawyer and politician, mayor of Haifa.
- 22 June – Edna Arbel, Israeli jurist and judge on the Israeli Supreme Court (died 2026).
- 23 June – Alex Levac, Israeli photojournalist and street photographer.
- 20 July – Yoram Ben-Zeev, Israeli diplomat.
- 10 September – Eitan Ben Eliyahu, Israeli general, commander of the Israeli Air Force.
- 26 August – Ron Huldai, Israeli politician, former Israeli Air Force fighter pilot and the current mayor of Tel Aviv.
- 29 August – Yoram Yair, Israeli general.
- 19 September – Ephraim Sneh, Israeli politician and former Brigadier General in the IDF.
- 1 October – Dror Kashtan, Israeli football manager (died 2024).
- 16 October – Roni Brizon, Israeli politician.
- 24 October – Yaacov Shavit, Israeli historian.
- 27 November – Aryeh Stern, Israeli rabbi, Ashkenazi Chief Rabbi of Jerusalem and member of the Chief Rabbinate of Israel (died 2026).
- 6 December – Arnon Milchan, Israeli film producer.
- Full date unknown
  - Dan Gillerman, Israeli diplomat, 13th Permanent Representative of Israel to the United Nations.
  - Nahum Barnea, Israeli journalist.
  - Assaf Hefetz, Israeli police commissioner.
  - Naomi Gal, Israeli writer.
  - Yossi Abulafia, Israeli writer, graphic artist, and director.
  - Doron Rubin, Israeli general, commander of the IDF headquarters for special operations (died 2018).
  - David Tartakover, Israeli graphic designer and political activist (died 2025).
  - Yasser Abed Rabbo, Palestinian politician, member of the PLO executive.

== Deaths ==
- 2 August – Berl Katznelson (born 1887), Russian-born Labor Zionist leader and journalist.
- 23 September - Israel Jacob Kligler (born 1889), Austrian-born microbiologist and humanist.
- 7 November – Hannah Szenes (born 1921), Hungarian-born Jewish poet, who served as a paratrooper during World War II for the British Army.
- 18 November:
  - Enzo Sereni (born 1905), Italian-born Jew, who served as a paratrooper during World War II for the British Army.
  - Aaron Abraham Kabak (born 1880), Hebrew author, recipient of the Bialik Prize.
