= 1947 in Mandatory Palestine =

- 1947 in the British Mandate of Palestine
«««
1946
1945
1944
»»»
1948
See also:
1947 in the United Kingdom
Other events of 1947

Events in the year 1947 in the British Mandate of Palestine.

== Incumbents ==
- High Commissioner – Sir Alan Cunningham

== Events ==
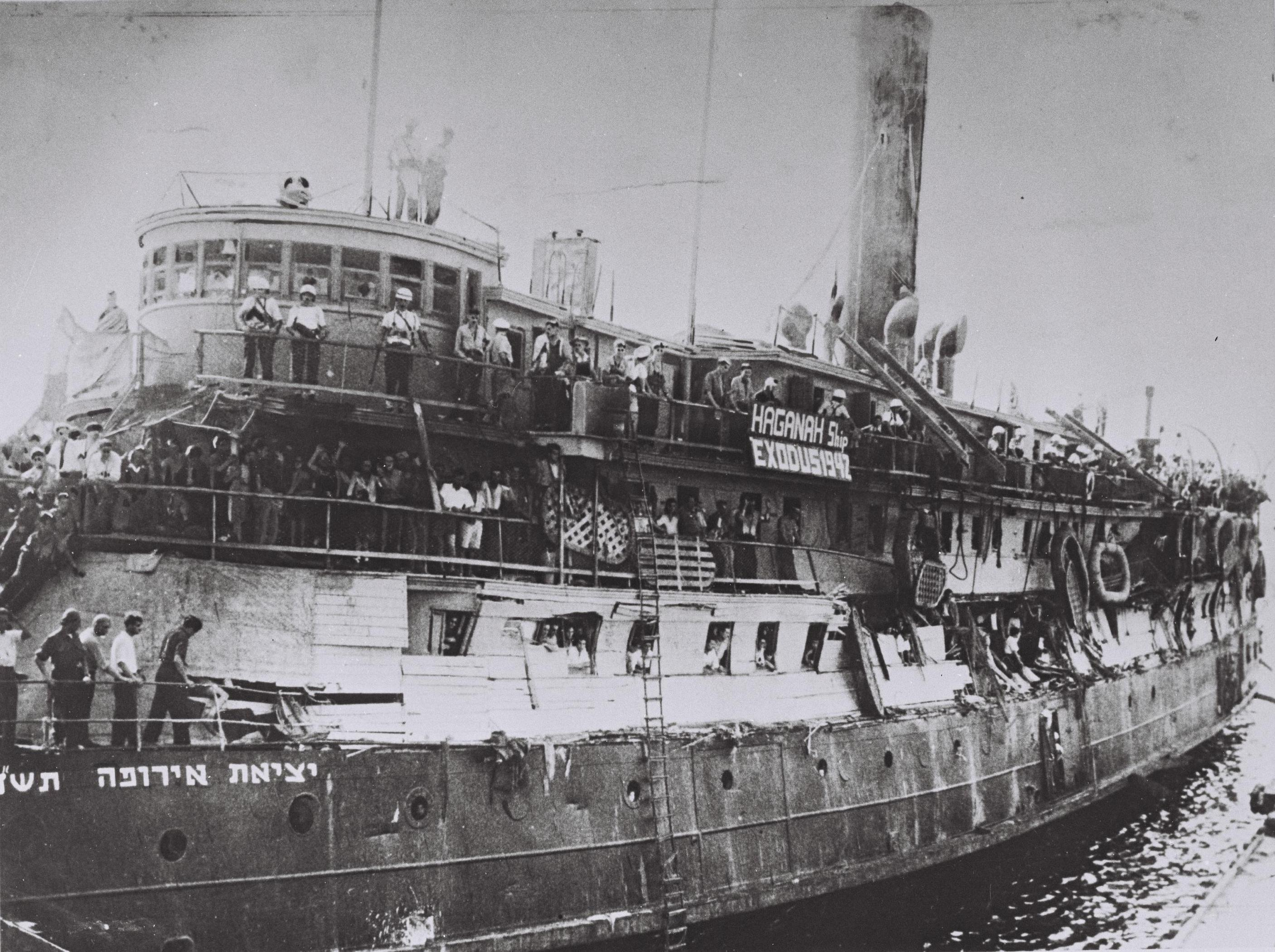
The Exodus after British takeover.

UN 1947 partition plan for Palestine

- 7 January – The founding of the kibbutz Mivtahim.
- 26 January – Irgun members kidnap a British intelligence officer two days before the planned execution date of the Irgun member Dov Gruner.
- 27 January – Irgun members kidnap the British President of the district court of Tel Aviv.
- 18 February – British Foreign Minister Ernest Bevin announces that the United Kingdom has decided to give up its mandate over Palestine and allow the United Nations to determine the country's future.
- 3 March – 13 people are killed in a raid on a British officer's club in Jerusalem by the Irgun. Simultaneously, multiple other targets throughout Palestine are attacked by the Irgun.
- 11 March – The founding of the kibbutz Ma'ayan Barukh.
- 4 May – Acre Prison break: Irgun forces break through the walls of the Acre prison and free 28 incarcerated Irgun and Lehi activists. 214 Arab prisoners also escaped.
- 16 June – The UNSCOP Committee, the Special UN Committee in charge of finding a solution to the conflict in Palestine, begins its work in Palestine.
- 30 June – The founding of the kibbutz Sa'ad.
- 11 July – The Exodus leaves France for Palestine, with 4,500 Jewish Holocaust survivor refugees on board who have no legal immigration certificates to enter Palestine.
- 12 July – The Irgun kidnaps two British Intelligence Corps NCOs in Netanya, and threatens to kill them if Irgun members death row prisoners held in the Acre prison are executed.
- 18 July – Following wide media and UNSCOP coverage, the Exodus is captured by British troops and refused entry into Palestine at the port of Haifa.
- 29 July – The British execute three Irgun members captured during the Acre Prison break. In response, the Irgun hangs the two British hostages kidnapped eighteen days earlier.
- 10 August – Hawaii Garden Massacre - 10 Arab gunmen open fire in the Hawaii Garden Nightclub in Tel Aviv, killing the owner, his Arab business partner, and four Jewish guests.
- 28 August – The founding of the Kibbutz HaOgen.
- 31 August – The UNSCOP Committee publishes the United Nations Partition Plan for Palestine.
- 12 November – The Murder of the Lehi Youth: Acting on a tip from the Shubaki family, the British raid a house where Lehi youth are conducting a training exercise. Three girls and two boys ages 16-18 are killed while trying to escape.
- 16 November – The United Kingdom begins withdrawing its army troops from Palestine.
- 29 November – The United Nations approves partition of Palestine into Jewish and Arab states. It is accepted by the Jews, but rejected by the Arab leaders (See ).

=== 1947–1948 Civil War ===
- 30 November – Following the announcement of the Partition Plan, Arabs in Palestine react violently and fighting breaks out leading to the civil war which centered around the Haganah and Palestinian Arabs supported by the Arab Liberation Army.
- 2–5 December – 1947 Jerusalem riots: The Arab Higher Committee declares a strike and public protest of the vote. A crowd of Arabs marching to Zion Square, Jerusalem, are stopped by the British, and the Arabs instead turn towards the commercial center of the city, burning many buildings and shops. Violence continued for two more days, with Arab mobs attacking a number of Jewish neighborhoods. 70 Jews and 50 Arabs are killed.
- 8 December - The Battle of Tikvah: Hasan Salama and 400 trained soldiers of the Army of the Holy War attack a dense area on the outskirts of Tel Aviv, and are repelled by 100 Jewish defenders. The first military engagement of the Mandate Civil War. 100 Arab soldiers killed, and four Jews (three civilians).
- 9 December – Yazur attack - Palmach militants throw an explosive into a cafe in Yazur, killing seven.
- 11 December – The Convoy of Ten: In an ambush, ten Jewish civilians are killed and four injured by Arab machine gun fire while trying to drive a convoy of four cars full of food and supplies to Arab-surrounded Gush Etzion.
- 30 December – Haifa Oil Refinery massacre: Irgun militants hurl two bombs into a crowd of Arab workers from a passing vehicle, killing six workers and wounding 42, damaging the relative peace between the two groups in Haifa. Later that day, the Arab crowd breaks into the refinery compound, killing 39 Jews.
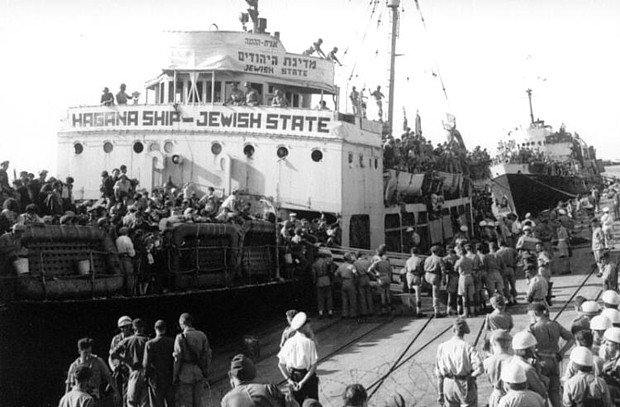
Haganah Ship Jewish State at Haifa Port, October 1947

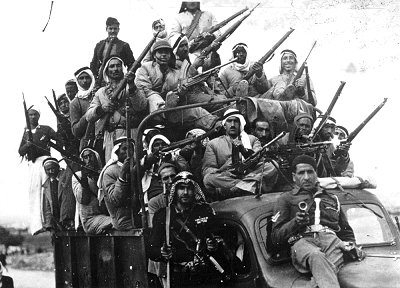
Palestinian Arab Volunteer Fighters, 1947

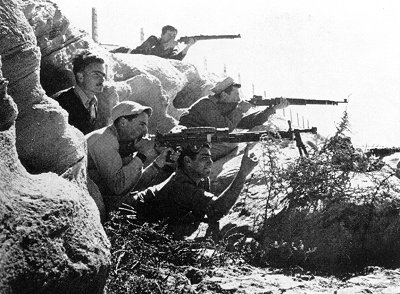
Haganah Fighters, 1947

=== Unknown dates ===
- The founding of the kibbutz Mashabei Sadeh.
- The founding of the kibbutz Tze'elim.
- The founding of the kibbutz Gevim.

== Births ==
- 20 January – Ze'ev Segal, Israeli jurist and journalist (died 2011).
- 21 January – Dan Chamizer, Israeli artist, journalist, and radio and television host.
- 22 January – Ali Yahya, Arab-Israeli diplomat, first Israeli-Arab to serve as an ambassador (died 2014).
- 30 January – Yehoshua Mondshine, Israeli Rabbi (died 2014).
- 4 February – Juval Aviv, Israeli-American security expert.
- 22 February – Yehonatan Geffen, Israeli author, poet, songwriter, journalist and playwright (died 2023).
- 31 March – Eliyahu M. Goldratt, Israeli business management guru (died 2011).
- 31 March – Ronny Reich, Israeli archaeologist.
- 1 April – Tzipi Shavit, Israeli actress, comedian, and entertainer.
- 4 April – Israel Sadan, Israeli police colonel, former commander of the Israel Border Police, and Mayor of Hadera.
- 22 April – Shmuel Rosenthal, Israeli footballer.
- 23 April – Dan Meridor, Israeli politician.
- 9 May – David Zilberman, Israeli economist.
- 28 May – Boaz Sharabi, Israeli musician.
- 3 June – Shuki Levy, Israeli-American composer, writer, director, and executive producer.
- 13 June – Elyakim Rubinstein, Israeli jurist, vice-president of the Israeli Supreme Court.
- 25 June – Zvi Galil, Israeli-American computer scientist and mathematician, President of Tel Aviv University
- 30 June – Yedidya Ya'ari, Israeli Admiral, commander of the Israeli Navy (2000–2004).
- 24 July – Amnon Straschnov, Israeli judge.
- 27 July – Giora Spiegel, Israeli footballer.
- 4 August – Yael German, Israeli politician.
- 4 August – Salim Joubran, Arab-Israeli jurist, judge on the Israeli Supreme Court.
- 1 September – Batya Gur, Israeli writer (died 2005).
- 15 September – Amos Kollek, Israeli film director, writer, and actor.
- 17 September – Ilanit, Israeli singer.
- 27 September – Shaul Yahalom, Israeli politician.
- 1 October – Aaron Ciechanover, Israeli biologist, recipient of the Nobel Prize in Chemistry.
- 2 October – Uzi Arad, Israeli strategist, National Security Advisor, and Mossad officer.
- 13 October – Avi Lerner, Israeli-American film producer.
- 26 October – Miriam Naor, Israeli jurist, judge on the Israeli Supreme Court (died 2022).
- 23 October – Abdel Aziz al-Rantissi, Palestinian Arab, co-founder of the militant Palestinian Islamist organization Hamas (died 2004).
- 7 November – Sefi Rivlin, Israeli actor (died 2013).
- Full date unknown
  - Efrat Natan, Israeli artist.
  - Minna Rozen, Israeli historian.
  - Moti Sasson, Israeli politician, current mayor of Holon.
  - Avraham Diskin, Israeli political scientist.
  - Yael Renan, Israeli writer and translator (died 2020).

== Deaths ==
- 19 January - Hayim Margolis-Kalwariski (born 1868), agronomist and Zionist thinker.
- 16 April
  - Dov Gruner (born 1912), Irgun member captured during a raid on a police station, executed by hanging.
  - Yehiel Dresner (born 1922), Irgun member, captured during the Night of the Beatings, executed by hanging.
  - Mordechai Alkahi (born 1925), Irgun member, captured during the Night of the Beatings, executed by hanging.
  - Eliezer Kashani (born 1923), Irgun member, captured during the Night of the Beatings, executed by hanging.
- 21 April
  - Meir Feinstein (born 1927), Irgun member captured following the bombing of a railway station, committed suicide while awaiting execution.
  - Moshe Barzani (born 1926), Lehi member captured carrying a grenade, committed suicide while awaiting execution.
- 23 May - Akiva Aryeh Weiss (born 1868), Zionist activist, one of the founders of Tel Aviv.
- 22 June - Jacob Steinberg (born 1887), poet.
- 9 July - Bat Sheva Yonis-Guttman (born 1880), physician, pioneer in infant care, founding member of the Hebrew Medical Association, first female physician in Palestine.
- 29 July
  - Avshalom Haviv (born 1926), Irgun member and former Palmach member captured during the Acre Prison break, executed by hanging.
  - Meir Nakar (born 1926), Irgun member captured during the Acre Prison break, executed by hanging.
  - Yaakov Weiss (born 1924), Irgun member captured during the Acre Prison break, and Czech immigrant who saved hundreds of Jews from the Nazis, executed by hanging.
- 10 August - Meir Teomi (born 1898), actor, murdered by gunfire in a Tel Aviv nightclub.
- 27 November - David Bloch-Blumenfeld (born 1884), Labor Zionist leader and second Mayor of Tel Aviv.
- 12 September - Sami Taha (born 1916), Palestinian Arab labor leader.
- 26 December - Elias Katz (born 1901), track and field athlete, killed by sniper fire.
- Date unknown
  - Aharon Roth (born 1894), Hasidic rebbe and Talmudic scholar.
