= 1941 in Mandatory Palestine =

- 1941 in the British Mandate of Palestine
«««
1940
1939
1938
»»»
1942
1943
1944
See also:
1941 in the United Kingdom
Other events of 1941

Events in the year 1941 in the British Mandate of Palestine.

== Incumbents ==
- High Commissioner – Sir Harold MacMichael
- Emir of Transjordan – Abdullah I bin al-Hussein
- Prime Minister of Transjordan – Tawfik Abu al-Huda

== Events ==
- 15 May – The Palmach is established.
- 14 July – World War II: The Armistice of Saint Jean d'Acre (also known as the "Convention of Acre") is signed on at the "Sidney Smith Barracks" on the outskirts of the city of Acre, ending the Allied invasion of Vichy French-controlled Syria and Lebanon.
- 2 November – The kibbutz of Ramat HaShofet is established.

== Births ==
- 24 January – Dan Shechtman, Israeli physicist and winner of the Nobel Prize in Physics
- 25 January – Ya'akov Shefi, Israeli politician
- 11 February – Avraham Hirschson, Israeli politician (died 2022)
- 13 March – Mahmoud Darwish, Palestinian Arab poet and writer of prose (died 2008)
- 1 April – Gideon Gadot, Israeli journalist (died 2012)
- 1 April – Michael Dezer, Israeli-American real estate developer
- 5 April – Eliyahu Bakshi-Doron, Israeli rabbi and Rishon LeTzion (died 2020)
- 8 April – Ya'akov Shahar, Israeli businessman
- 20 April – Ayala Procaccia, Israeli jurist, judge on the Israeli Supreme Court
- 22 April – Amir Pnueli, Israeli computer scientist and Turing Award winner (died 2009)
- 13 June – Esther Ofarim, Israeli folk singer
- 7 July – Yisrael Poliakov, Israeli singer, actor and entertainer (died 2007)
- 13 July – Ehud Manor, Israeli songwriter, translator, and radio and TV personality (died 2005)
- 19 August – Gabriela Shalev, Israeli jurist and diplomat
- 10 October – Hanan Goldblatt, Israeli actor
- 24 November – Joel Moses, Israeli-American mathematician, computer scientist, and professor at the Massachusetts Institute of Technology (died 2022)
- 5 September – Eitan Avitsur, Israeli composer and conductor (died 2018)
- Full date unknown
  - Ze'ev Herzog – Israeli archaeologist

== Deaths ==
- 10 January - Issai Schur, Russian-born mathematician (born 1875)
- 20 May – David Raziel (born 1910), Russian-born Palestinian Jew, fighter of the Jewish underground and one of the founders of the Irgun
- 2 October – Menachem Ussishkin (born 1863), Russian-born Palestinian Jew, notable Zionist leader and chairman of the Jewish National Fund
- 10 October - Samuel S. Bloom (born 1860), Zionist leader and industrialist.
- 12 December - David Yellin (born 1864), educator, Hebrew language revivalist, and politician.
