= 1939 in Mandatory Palestine =

- 1939 in the British Mandate of Palestine
«««
1938
1937
1936
»»»
1940
1941
1942
See also:
1939 in the United Kingdom
Other events of 1939

Events in the year 1939 in the British Mandate of Palestine.

== Incumbents ==
- High Commissioner – Sir Harold MacMichael
- Emir of Transjordan – Abdullah I bin al-Hussein
- Prime Minister of Transjordan – Tawfik Abu al-Huda

== Events ==
- 7 February – 17 March – The London Conference at St. James's Palace is held in an attempt to resolve the future of the British Mandate over Palestine. The conference ends without making any progress.
- 27 February – 38 Arab Palestinians killed and 44 injured when a number of bombs set by the Irgun exploded across the country during the morning.
- 2 March – The first broadcast of the underground radio station of the Irgun "Kol Tsion HaLokhemet".
- 27 March – Abdul Rahim al Hajj Mohammed, a Palestinian leader was ambushed and killed by the British Army.
- 2 May – The founding of the kibbutz Dahlia
- 3 May – The founding of the kibbutz Dafna
- 4 May – The founding of the kibbutz Dan
- 8 May – The founding of the kibbutz Sde Eliyahu
- 17 May – The British government issues the White Paper of 1939, following the failure of the London Conference and the continued Arab revolt, which abandons the idea of partitioning, sharply restricts Jewish immigration into Palestine and places severe restrictions on the rights of Jews to buy land from Arabs.
- 23 May – The founding of the kibbutz Mahanayim
- 23 May – The founding of the moshav Shadmot Dvora
- 23 May – The founding of the kibbutz HaZore'im
- 23 May – The founding of the kibbutz Kfar Glikson
- 28 May – The founding of the moshav Mishmar HaYam
- 23 June – The founding of the kibbutz Hamadia
- 26 June – The founding of the moshav Kfar Netter
- 12 July – The founding of the kibbutz Negba
- 13 August – The founding of the kibbutz Gesher
- 29 October – The founding of the kibbutz Amir

=== Unknown dates ===
- The founding of the kibbutz Beit Oren
- The founding of the kibbutz Afek
- The founding of the moshav Kfar Warburg

== Births ==
- 3 January – Arik Einstein, Israeli singer-songwriter (died 2013)
- 10 February – Yuval Zaliouk, Israeli-American conductor
- 12 February – Yael Dayan, Israeli politician and author (died 2024)
- 4 March – Zvi Mazel, Israeli diplomat
- 23 March – Itamar Even-Zohar, Israeli cultural researcher
- 11 April – Aharon Shabtai, Israeli poet
- 22 April – Ori Orr, Israeli general and politician
- 27 April – Gideon Ariel, Israeli Olympic athlete and biomechanist
- 3 May – Adir Zik, Israeli television producer and journalist (died 2005)
- 4 May – Amos Oz, Israeli writer, novelist, and journalist (died 2018)
- 22 June – Ada Yonath, Israeli crystallographer, recipient of the Nobel Prize in Chemistry (died 2026)
- 30 June – Giora Lev, Israeli general and politician, 7th Mayor of Petah Tikva
- 8 July – Abdelhamid Sharaf, former Jordanian Prime Minister (died 1980)
- 14 July – Siona Shimshi, Israeli painter, sculptor, ceramist, and textile designer (died 2018)
- 17 July – Shabtai Shavit, Israeli military officer and Mossad director (died 2023)
- 22 July – Gila Almagor, Israeli actress and author
- 24 July – Tamar Adar, Israeli writer (died 2008)
- 15 August – Yisrael Ariel, Israeli rabbi
- 16 August – Ram Caspi, Israeli lawyer (died 2025)
- 17 August – Gideon Sagi, Israeli politician
- 24 August – Yehoshua Sobol, Israeli playwright, writer, and director
- 26 August – Pinchas Goldstein, Israeli politician (died 2007)
- 9 September – Reuven Rivlin, Israeli politician, current President of Israel and former Speaker of the Knesset
- 16 September – Yaakov Neeman, Israeli politician (died 2017)
- 19 September – Moshe Weinberg, Israeli wrestling coach, murdered at the Munich Olympics (died 1972)
- 24 September – Moti Kirschenbaum, Israeli journalist and media personality (died 2015)
- 29 September – Yoel Schwartz, Haredi rabbi, author and teacher (died 2022)
- 13 October – Gideon Tish, Israeli football player (died 2026)
- 10 November – Sakher Habash, Palestinian Arab politician, a leader of the Fatah movement (died 2009)
- 24 December – Avihu Ben-Nun, Israeli fighter pilot, commander of the Israeli Air Force
- 28 December – Yehoram Gaon, Israeli singer, actor, television host, and author
- Full date unknown
  - Hakam Balawi, Palestinian Arab writer and member of Palestinian Legislative Council (died 2020)
  - Ghada Karmi, Palestinian Arab doctor of medicine, author and academic
  - Samih al-Qasim, Transjordanian-born Israeli Druze poet (died 2024)
  - Avner Shalev, Israeli general, director of Yad Vashem
