= 1942 in Mandatory Palestine =

- 1942 in the British Mandate of Palestine
«««
1941
1940
1939
»»»
1943
1944
1945
See also:
1942 in the United Kingdom
Other events of 1942

Events in the year 1942 in the British Mandate of Palestine.

== Incumbents ==
- High Commissioner – Sir Harold MacMichael
- Emir of Transjordan – Abdullah I bin al-Hussein
- Prime Minister of Transjordan – Tawfik Abu al-Huda

== Events ==
- January – The Lehi underground Zionist group kills two members of the Histadruth.
- 12 February – Avraham Stern, the leader of the Lehi underground Zionist group, is shot by British police in the Tel Aviv apartment in which he is hiding.
- 24 February – MV Struma, carrying Jewish refugees from Axis-allied Romania to Palestine, is torpedoed and sunk by the Shch-213, killing at least 768 civilians, and possibly as many as 791, of whom 785 were Jews.
- May – The Tel Aviv Central Bus Station opens to the public.
- 6–11 May – The Biltmore Conference, held in New York City at the prestigious Biltmore Hotel with 600 delegates and Zionist leaders from 18 countries attending, makes a fundamental departure from traditional Zionist policy and demands "that Palestine be established as a Jewish Commonwealth" (state), rather than a "homeland." This sets the ultimate aim of the movement.
- 2 August – The British form the Palestine Regiment, consisting of one Arab and three Jewish battalions. Initially, the Regiment is principally involved in guard duties in Egypt and North Africa. The British also want it to undermine efforts of Hajj Amin al-Husayni, who is working to obtain Arab support for the Axis powers against the Allies.

== Unknown date ==
- Ihud, a Jewish political party, established.

== Notable births ==
- 21 January – Yigal Bibi, Israeli politician
- 12 February – Ehud Barak, the 13th Chief of Staff of the IDF and former Prime Minister of Israel
- 28 February – Dorit Beinisch, Israeli jurist, President of the Israeli Supreme Court
- 2 March – Meir Ariel, Israeli singer and poet (died 1999)
- 19 March – Ran Goren, Israeli general and fighter pilot
- 16 April – Zvi Arad, Israeli mathematician (died 2018)
- 28 May – Eliezer Rivlin, Israeli jurist, judge on the Israeli Supreme Court
- 6 June – Gideon Toury, Israeli scholar (died 2016)
- 4 July – Micha Ram, Israeli military officer, commander of the Israeli Navy (died 2018)
- 4 July – Uriel Reichman, Israeli politician and professor of law, founder of IDC Herzliya
- 6 August – Ron Nachman, Israeli politician, founder and first mayor of Ariel (died 2013)
- 24 August – Reuven Gal, Israeli psychologist
- 1 September – Michael Ben-Yair, Israeli jurist, Attorney General of Israel
- 2 September – Yossi Vardi, Israeli entrepreneur
- 19 November – Amihai Mazar, Israeli archaeologist
- 7 December – Ehud Kalai, Israeli-American game theorist
- Full date unknown
  - Itamar Rabinovich, Israeli diplomat

== Notable deaths ==
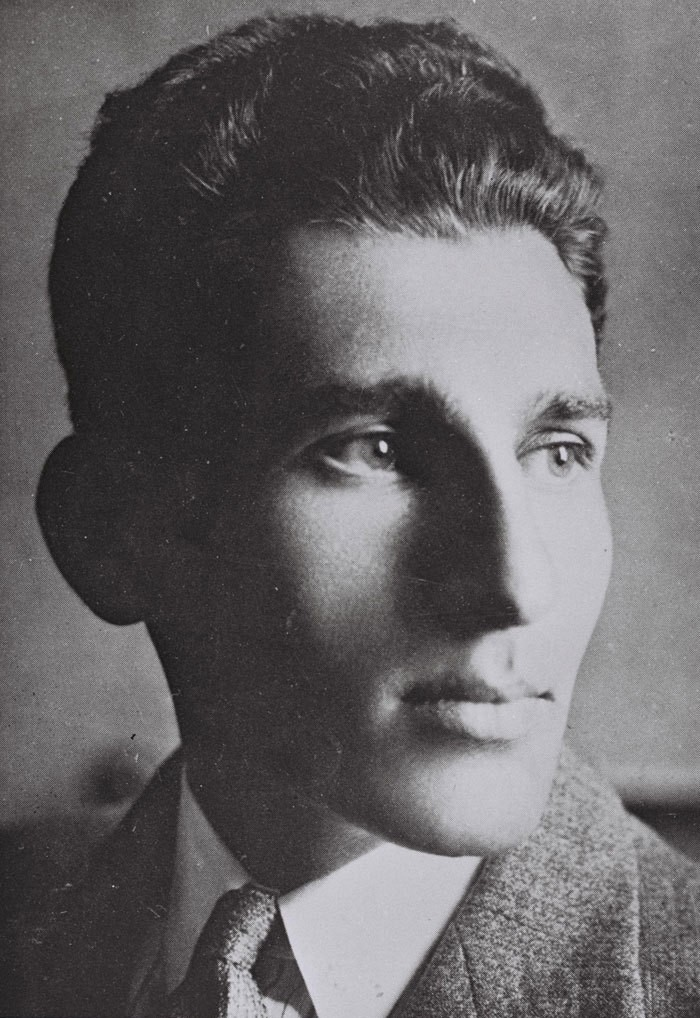
Avraham Stern

- 3 January – Pinhas Rutenberg (born 1879), Ukrainian-born Palestinian Jew who was the founder of The Palestine Electricity Corporation
- 12 February – Avraham Stern (born 1907), Polish-born Palestinian Jew who was the leader of the Lehi
- 2 April - Olga Hankin (born 1852), Zionist activist and midwife.
- 29 July - Flinders Petrie (born 1853), British archaeologist.
- 15 October - Avrohom Elyashiv (born 1877), rabbi.
