= 1943 in Mandatory Palestine =

- 1943 in the British Mandate of Palestine
«««
1942
1941
1940
»»»
1944
1945
1946
See also:
1943 in the United Kingdom
Other events of 1943

Events in the year 1943 in the British Mandate of Palestine.

== Incumbents ==
- High Commissioner – Sir Harold MacMichael
- Emir of Transjordan – Abdullah I bin al-Hussein
- Prime Minister of Transjordan – Tawfik Abu al-Huda

== Events ==
- 18 February - World War II: The Polish Anders Army arrived in Palestine, where many Polish Jews, including Menachem Begin, desert to work on establishing a Jewish state in Palestine. This becomes known as the 'Anders Aliyah'.
- 12 May: The founding of the kibbutz Gvulot.
- 1-20 November: Lehi members flee from the Latrun Detention Camp through a 70 meter long tunnel.
- December: The founding of the kibbutz Yad Mordechai.

== Notable births ==
- 2 January – Daniel Pe'er, Israeli television host and newsreader (died 2017)
- 1 March – Benny Begin, Israeli geologist and politician
- 9 April – Uri Gil, Israeli Air Force officer
- 30 April – Ze'ev Boim, Israeli politician and Knesset member (died 2011)
- 30 April – Nechemya Cohen, Israeli army officer, the most decorated soldier in the history of the IDF (died 1967)
- 7 May – Herzl Bodinger, Israeli Air Force commander (died 2025)
- 18 May – Gershon Shefa, Israeli Olympic swimmer
- 19 May – Yosef Ahimeir, Israeli politician and journalist
- 2 June – Mordechai Shmuel Ashkenazi, Israeli rabbi, chief rabbi of Kfar Chabad (died 2015)
- 8 June – Uri Davis, Israeli academic and anti-Zionist political activist
- 12 June – Benjamin Beit-Hallahmi, Israeli psychology professor
- 2 August – Uzi Landau, Israeli politician
- 5 August – Uri Sagi, Israeli general
- 18 September – Issak Tavior, Israeli pianist, composer, and conductor
- 25 September – Yoav Gelber, Israeli historian
- 7 October – Yoram Globus, Israeli film producer and cinema owner
- 26 October – Ron Ben-Yishai, Israeli journalist
- 8 November – Boaz Davidson, Israeli film director, producer, and screenwriter
- 22 November – Naomi Blumenthal, Israeli politician
- 12 December – Hanan Porat, former Israeli politician (died 2011)
- 18 December – Hanoch Levin, Israeli playwright, theater director, author and poet (died 1999)
- Full date unknown
  - Awad Saud Awad, Palestinian writer and journalist
  - Ghassan Shakaa, Palestinian mayor (died 2018)
  - Khalil Suleiman, Palestinian doctor, head of the Palestine Red Crescent Society (PRCS) Emergency Medical Service (died 2002)
  - Mubarak Awad, Palestinian Arab, Arab-American psychologist and political activist
  - Nabil Anani, Palestinian artist
  - Tanya Reinhart, Israeli linguist and peace activist (died 2007)
  - Yekutiel Gershoni, Israeli historian and paralympic champion (died 2021)

== Notable deaths ==
- 1 January – Arthur Ruppin (born 1876), German-born Zionist Palestinian Jewish leader
- 12 March - Jiří Langer (born 1894), Hebrew poet, scholar, journalist, and teacher
- 20 September - Sonia Belkind (born 1870), Russian (Belarus)-born doctor, first gynecologist in Ottoman Palestine
- 14 October – Shaul Tchernichovsky (born 1875), Russian-born Palestinian Jewish Hebrew poet
