= Kastein =

Kastein is a surname. Notable people with the surname include:

- Gerrit Kastein (1910–1943), Dutch communist, neurologist, and resistance fighter
- Joseph Kastein (1890–1945), German-born author
- Jenny Kastein (1913–2000), Dutch swimmer
