= Eli Alon =

Israeli anesthesiologist (born 1945)

Eli Alon (Hebrew: אלי אלון; born 1945 in Tel Aviv) is an anesthesiologist who specialises in pain therapy.

== Biography ==
Eli Alon holds a Medical degree from the University of Milan since 1972. He completed his residency in anesthesiology at the University of Milan and the University Hospital Zurich and a clinical research fellowship at the University of California, San Francisco.

He was chairman of anesthesiology at Ospedale Regionale di Lugano. He was the president of the anesthesiologists in the Canton Ticino.

He was chief of an interdisciplinary pain clinic in Zurich and consultant in pain management at the University Hospital Zurich.

Alon's fields of research and investigation are obstetric anesthesia and chronic pain management. He was President of the Swiss Pain Society SPS. He was Editor of the European Journal of Pain, Acta Anaesthesiologica Helvetica, International Monitor of Regional Anesthesia, and Obstetric Anesthesia Digest.

Eli Alon is based in Zurich, Switzerland.

== Awards and honors ==
- Honorary member of the Swiss Pain Society SPS
- Dr. Margrit Egnér Foundation Award 2015

== Publications ==
Alon is the author of 10 books and Proceedings, over 81 original articles and 45 book chapters.

- Anästhesie und Schmerzlinderung in der Geburtshilfe ISBN 3-456-82779-2
- Practical aspects of pain management ISBN 88-7922-099-3
- Lectures during the joint annual congress... ISBN 88-7922-015-2
- Chronic pain-pharmacological and interventional therapy
- Clinical aspects of pain management
- Erfolgreiches Management von Schmerzpatienten
