= 1946 in Mandatory Palestine =

«««
1945
1944
1943
»»»
1947 →
1946 →
See also:
1946 in the United Kingdom
Other events of 1946

Events in the year 1946 in Mandatory Palestine.

== Incumbents ==
- High Commissioner – Sir Alan Cunningham
- Emirate of Transjordan – Abdullah I bin al-Hussein until 25 May (thereafter King of Transjordan)
- Prime Minister of Emirate of Transjordan – Ibrahim Hashem until 25 May (thereafter Kingdom of Transjordan)

== Events ==
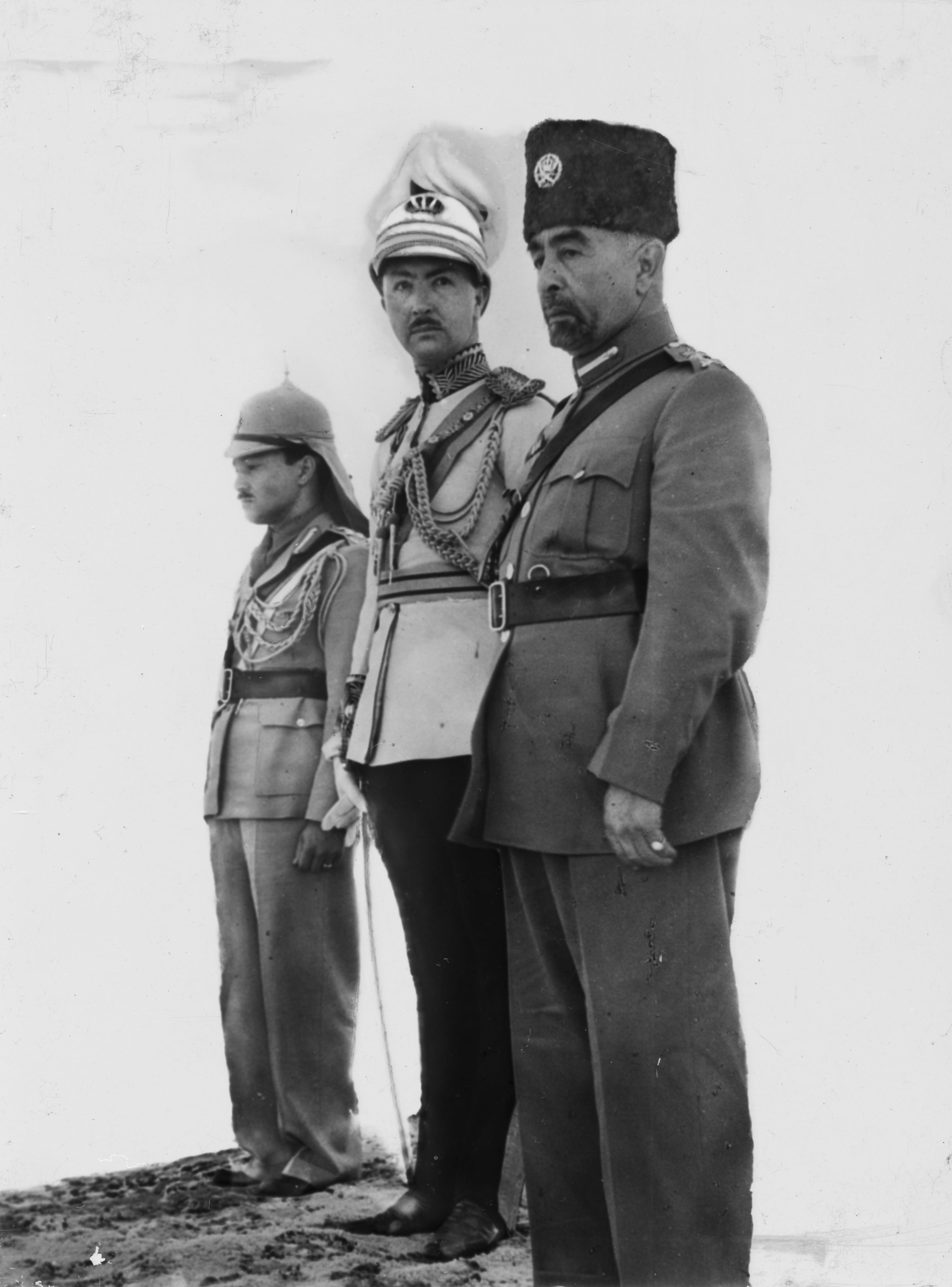
The last day of the British mandate in the Transjordan region in which emir Abdullah (on the right) was crowned as Transjordan's king, 25 May 1946.

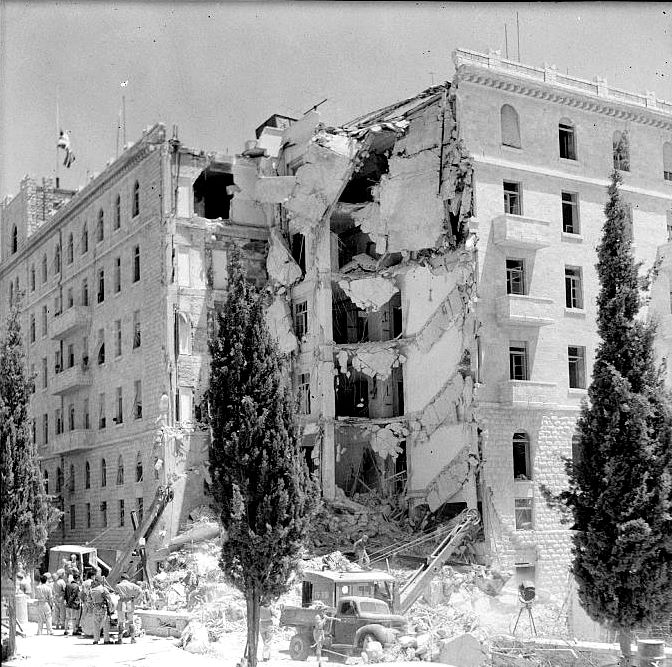
King David Hotel bombing: The King David Hotel after the bombing

- January – The founding of the kibbutz Ami'ad.
- 25 February – Irgun and Lehi members blow up dozens of British military aircraft in airports at Lydda, Qastina and Sirkin.
- 22 March – The ruler of Transjordan, Emir Abdullah I, negotiated a new Anglo-Transjordanian treat, under which the Emirate of Transjordan (part of the British Mandate of Palestine) gained full independence and become the Hashemite Kingdom of Transjordan.
- 25 April – Members of Lehi kill seven British soldiers guarding a military car park in Tel Aviv.
- 30 April – The Anglo-American Committee of Inquiry recommended the immediate admission of 100,000 Jewish refugees from Europe into Palestine. It also recommended that Palestine remain a mandated territory, that facilities be put in place to ensure Jewish migration and that the 1940 Land Act which banned Jews from purchasing land in 95% of Palestine be rescinded.
- 25 May – The United Kingdom grants full sovereignty to Transjordan. The parliament of Transjordan proclaimed the ruler of Transjordan, emir Abdullah, as Transjordan's king and formally changed the name of the country from the Emirate of Transjordan to the Hashemite Kingdom of Transjordan. Three years later, the country changes its name to Jordan.
- 16 June – Night of the Bridges: Ten Palmach members blow up bridges across Palestine which link Palestine to the neighboring countries Lebanon, Syria, Transjordan, and Egypt, in order to immobilize its transportation.
- 29 June – Operation Agatha.
- 22 July – King David Hotel bombing: Irgun members detonate bombs in the basement of the King David Hotel in Jerusalem, where the British had brought a large amount of documents confiscated from the Jewish Agency for Israel. The attack kills 91 people and injures 45 more, mostly civilians. The hotel was a center of British administration at the time, although Arabs and Jews were also victims. The Jewish National Council condemns the attack.
- 6 October – The founding of the kibbutz Urim.
- 6 October – The founding of the kibbutz Be'eri.
- 6 October – The founding of the kibbutz Gal On.
- 6 October – The founding of the kibbutz Hatzerim.
- 6 October – The founding of the kibbutz Mishmar HaNegev.
- 6 October – The founding of the kibbutz Nirim.
- 6 October – The founding of the kibbutz Shoval.
- 23 October – The founding of the kibbutz Ein Tzurim.
- 30 October – The founding of the kibbutz Dovrat.
- 26 November – The founding of the kibbutz Yehiam.
- December – David Ben-Gurion appointed director of Jewish Agency for Israel security policy at the Zionist Congress in Basel.

=== Unknown dates ===
- The founding of the kibbutz Regba.

== Notable births ==
- 1 January – Nissan Slomiansky, Israeli politician
- 7 January – Aviem Sella, Israeli fighter pilot
- 5 February – Amnon Dankner, Israeli newspaper editor and author (died 2013)
- 22 February – Motti Mizrachi, Israeli artist
- 26 February – Ephraim Sidon, Israeli author, playwright and satirist
- 12 March – Ya'acov Dorchin, Israeli sculptor and painter
- 15 April – Tsvi Misinai, Israeli computer scientist and researcher
- 18 April – Nahum Manbar, Israeli businessman convicted for selling arms to Iran
- 24 April – Benjamin Rawitz-Castel, Israeli classical pianist (died 2006)
- 26 April – Michael Reisser, Israeli politician (died 1988).
- 9 May - Yoel Bin-Nun, Israeli rabbi and religious scholar.
- 11 May – Moni Fanan, Israeli basketball team manager (died 2009).
- 2 June – Gideon Remez, Israeli journalist.
- 21 June – Ehud Adiv, Israeli anti-Zionist activist imprisoned for collaborating with Syria and the PLO
- 7 July – Amiram Levin, Israeli general and Mossad deputy director
- 1 September – Shalom Hanoch, Israeli singer
- 15 September – Yitzchak Dovid Grossman, Israeli rabbi, founder and dean of the Migdal Ohr educational NGO and member of the Chief Rabbinate Council
- 20 September – Dudu Topaz, Israeli TV personality, comedian, actor, screenwriter, playwright, author and radio and television host (died 2009)
- 4 October – Dov Weissglass, Israeli lawyer, businessman, and manager and office bureau chief for the Prime Minister
- 6 October – Menachem Zilberman, Israeli actor, comedian, and songwriter (died 2014)
- 8 October – Hanan Ashrawi, Palestinian Arab scholar, legislator and political activist
- 16 October – Ya'akov Yosef, Israeli rabbi and politician (died 2013)
- 16 October – Israel Bartal, Israeli historian
- 18 October – Eliezer Moses, Israeli politician
- 20 October – Tsvia Walden, Israeli psycholinguist
- 17 November – Nehemiah Tamari, Israeli major general (Aluf) and head of IDF Central Command (died 1994)
- 18 November – Naomi Chazan, Israeli politician, academic, and political activist.
- 28 November – Nachman Shai, Israeli politician, military spokesman, and journalist.
- 20 December – Uri Geller, Israeli paranormalist
- 24 December – Uri Barbash, Israeli film director
- Full date unknown
  - Esther Farbstein, Israeli historian
  - Kohava Levy, Israeli singer-songwriter
  - Adiva Geffen, Israeli author and playwright

== Notable deaths ==
- 20 February - Abraham Kahana (born 1874), Russian-born Biblical scholar, historian, and translator.
- 13 June - Joseph Kastein (born 1890), German-born writer and jurist.
- 26 March - Bracha Fuld (born 1927), German-born Palmach fighter.
- 16 June - Omar al-Bitar (born 1880), Palestinian Arab politician, mayor of Jaffa.
- 11 July - Sophia Getzowa (born 1872), Belarusian-born pathologist and scientist.
- 22 July – Edward Sperling (born 1889), Russian-born Zionist writer, humorist, and Mandate government official, killed in the King David Hotel bombing.
- 10 August - Isaac Breuer (born 1883), rabbi and first President of Poalei Agudat Yisrael.
- 9 October - Israel Aharoni (born 1882), Russian-born Jewish zoologist in Palestine.
