= 1938 in Mandatory Palestine =

- 1938 in the British Mandate of Palestine
«««
1937
1936
1935
»»»
1939
1940
1941
See also:
1938 in the United Kingdom
Other events of 1938

Events in the year 1938 in the British Mandate of Palestine.

== Incumbents ==
- High Commissioner – Sir Arthur Grenfell Wauchope until 1 March; Sir Harold MacMichael
- Emir of Transjordan – Abdullah I bin al-Hussein
- Prime Minister of Transjordan – Ibrahim Hashem until 28 September; Tawfik Abu al-Huda

== Events ==
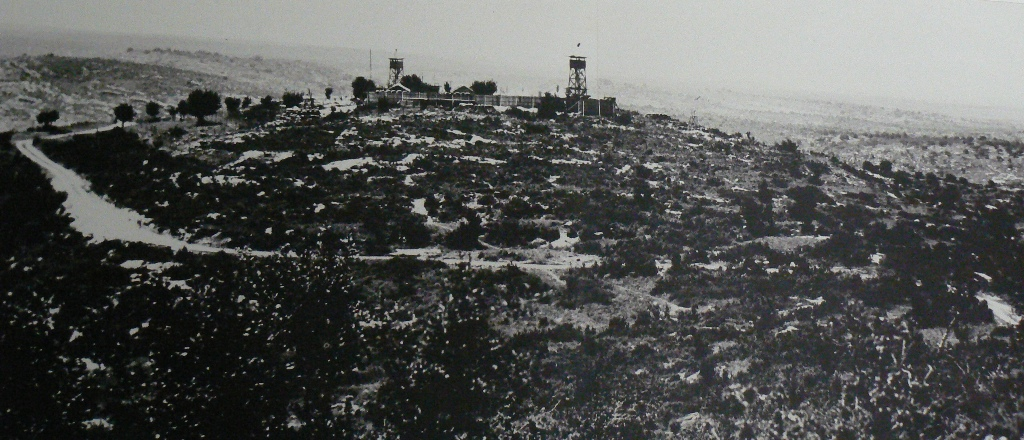
Kibbutz Hanita, built in the Tower and stockade settlement method, 1938

- 4 January – The British government appoints the Woodhead Commission to explore the practicalities of the partition of Palestine.
- 10 January – James Leslie Starkey, a noted British archaeologist of the ancient Near East and Palestine who leads the first excavations in Tel Lachish, is killed by a gang of armed Arabs near Bayt Jibrin on a track leading from Bayt Jibrin to Hebron.
- 23 February – The Port of Tel Aviv officially opens, as a competing (Jewish) port to the port in Jaffa, the latter having been crippled by the Arab revolt and general strike since 1936.
- 1 March – Sir Harold MacMichael assumes office as the High Commissioner of Palestine.
- 21 March – The founding of the kibbutz Hanita
- 13 April – The founding of the moshav Shavei Tzion as part of the tower and stockade settlement scheme.
- 26 June – The founding of the kibbutz Alonim
- 29 June – Shlomo Ben-Yosef executed for ambushing an Arab bus near Safad.
- 6 July – 18 Arabs and 5 Jews were killed by two simultaneous bombs in the Arab melon market in Haifa, 79 people were wounded.
- 16 July – 10 Arabs were killed and 29 wounded by a bomb at a marketplace in Jerusalem.
- 17 July – The founding of the kibbutz Ma'ale HaHamisha
- 25 July – The founding of the kibbutz Tel Yitzhak
- 25 July – 39 Arabs were killed and over 60 wounded by a second bomb in the Haifa vegetable market.
- 16 August – Former Jewish policeman Mordechai Schwarcz executed for the murder of an Arab policeman
- 17 August – The founding of the moshav Beit Yehoshua
- 25 August – The founding of the kibbutz Ein HaMifratz
- 26 August – 24 Arabs were killed and 39 wounded by a bomb in the Jaffa vegetable market.
- 30 August – The founding of the kibbutz Ma'ayan Tzvi
- 2 October – 1936–1939 Arab revolt in Palestine: In the 1938 Tiberias massacre, Arab rioters kill 19 Jews in the city of Tiberias, eleven of whom are children. During the massacre, 70 armed Arabs set fire to Jewish homes and the local synagogue.
- 12 October – The British Government announces sending a further four battalions to Palestine.
- 18 October – British army troops regain control of the old city of Jerusalem, which is occupied by Arab extremists in early October.
- 9 November – A technical British committee, known as the Woodhead Commission, rejected the Peel Commission partition plan mostly on the grounds that it could not be achieved without a large forced transfer of Arabs. It proposed "a modification of partition which, ...seems, subject to certain reservations, to form a satisfactory basis of settlement", if the U.K is prepared to provide a "sufficient assistance to enable the Arab State to balance its budget".
- 16 November – The founding of the moshav Sharona
- 17 November – The founding of the moshav Geulim
- 24 November – The founding of the kibbutz Eilon
- 25 November – The founding of the kibbutz Neve Eitan
- 25 November – The founding of the kibbutz Kfar Ruppin
- 29 November – The founding of the kibbutz Kfar Masaryk
- 22 December – The founding of the kibbutz Mesilot

=== Unknown dates ===
- The founding of the moshav Sde Warburg
- The founding of the moshav Ramat Hadar

== Notable births ==
- 13 January – Yehoshua Porath, Israeli historian (died 2019)
- 24 January – Yoram Taharlev, Israeli poet, author, and comedian (died 2022)
- 30 January – Yoram Tsafrir, Israeli archaeologist (died 2015)
- 13 March – Dan Margalit, Israeli journalist (died 2025)
- 3 April – Boaz Moav, Israeli politician, academic, and activist (died 2002)
- 14 April – Rivka Michaeli, Israeli actress
- 20 May – Giora Epstein, Israeli air force officer and fighter ace (died 2025)
- 1 July – Ilana Karaszyk, Israeli Olympic runner, long jumper
- 14 July – Moshe Safdie, Israeli-American architect and urban designer
- 21 July – Ya'akov Ahimeir, Israeli journalist and television and radio personality
- 9 August – Moshe Maya, Israeli rabbi and politician
- 29 August – Amnon Reshef, Israeli general
- 29 August – Ofer Bar-Yosef, Israeli archaeologist and anthropologist (died 2020)
- 3 October – Dan Bar-On, Israeli psychologist (died 2008)
- 29 October – Ralph Bakshi, Israeli-American director of animated and live-action films
- 4 December – Nava Arad, Israeli politician and Member of Knesset (1981–1992, 1995–1996) (died 2022)
- Full date unknown
  - Amos Meller, Israeli composer and conductor (died 2007)
  - Dan Meyerstein, Israeli chemist and resident of Ariel University
  - Naji al-Ali, Palestinian Arab cartoonist (died 1987)
  - Ahmed Jibril, Palestinian Arab, founder and leader of the militant group PFLP-GC (died 2021)
  - Abu Ali Mustafa, Palestinian Arab, member of the PLO executive (died 2001)
