= 1945 in Mandatory Palestine =

- 1945 in the British Mandate of Palestine
«««
1944
1943
1942
»»»
1946
1947
1948
See also:
1945 in the United Kingdom
Other events of 1945

Events in the year 1945 in the British Mandate of Palestine.

== Incumbents ==
- High Commissioner – John Vereker, 6th Viscount Gort until 21 November; Sir Alan Cunningham
- Emirate of Transjordan – Abdullah I bin al-Hussein
- Prime Minister of Transjordan – Samir al-Rifai until 19 May; Ibrahim Hashem

== Events ==
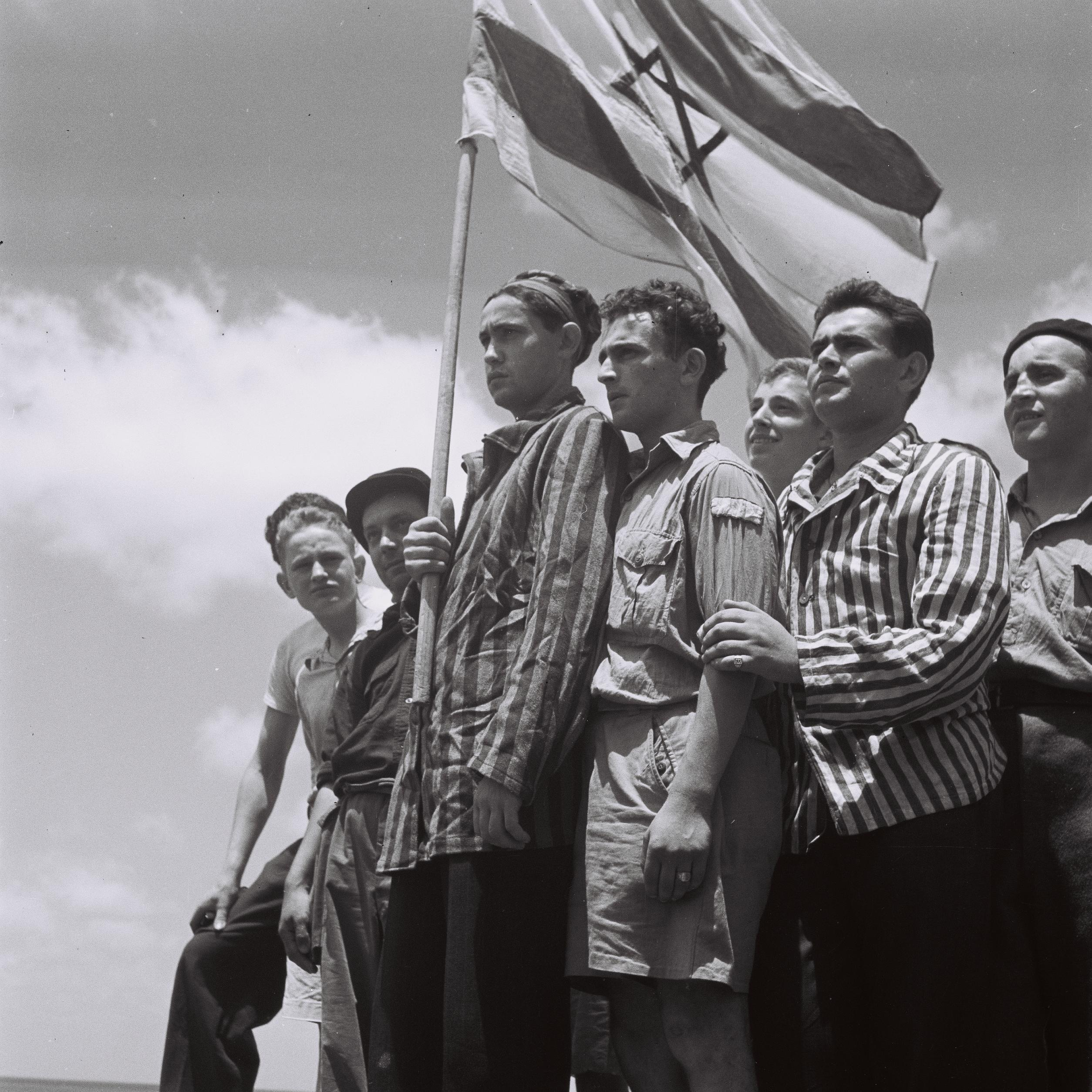
Buchenwald survivors arrive in Haifa to be arrested by the British, 15 July 1945

- 11 July – The founding of the kibbutz Hukok.
- 15 July – Jewish Holocaust survivors of the Buchenwald Nazi concentration camp arrive at Haifa port and are arrested by the British.
- 31 August – U.S. President Harry Truman issues a statement requesting the British government to admit 100,000 Jewish refugees in Europe into Palestine.
- 27 September – The Defence Emergency Regulations are enacted by the Mandatory authorities.
- 2 November – Arabs demonstrate against the British.
- 5 November – Sir Alan Cunningham assumes office as the High Commissioner of Palestine.

=== Unknown dates ===
- The founding of the kibbutz Gal'ed.

== Notable births ==
- 17 January – Asher Grunis, Israeli jurist, former President of the Supreme Court of Israel
- 30 January – Yoram Lass, Israeli politician and physician, professor of medicine at Tel Aviv University
- 9 February – Haim Be'er, Israeli novelist
- 20 February – Amram Mitzna, Israeli politician and former general, acting Mayor of Yeruham, former Mayor of Haifa
- 23 February – Yossi Ben Hanan, Israeli general
- 1 March – Tom Segev, Israeli historian
- 1 March – Ehud Yaari, Israeli journalist
- 8 March – Atar Arad, Israeli-American musician
- 8 March – David Ascalon, Israeli sculptor and stained glass artist
- 15 March – Danny Yatom, Israeli politician and Mossad head
- 22 March – Hillel Weiss, Israeli literature professor
- 28 March – Ruth Gavison, Israeli jurist (died 2020)
- 29 March – Yehuda Barkan, Israeli actor, producer, director and screenwriter (died 2020)
- 2 April – Moshe Peled, Israeli politician
- 9 April – Adam Baruch, Israeli journalist, writer and art critic (died 2008)
- 10 April – Mordechai Mishani, Israeli politician (died 2013)
- 19 April – Eliezer Mizrahi, Israeli painter
- 21 April – Nadav Levitan, Israeli film director and screenwriter (died 2010)
- 26 April – Avishai Henik, Israeli neurocognitive psychologist
- 29 April - Giora Romm, Israeli Air Force officer, director of the Civil Aviation Authority of Israel (died 2023)
- 14 May – Yochanan Vollach, Israeli footballer
- 28 May – Anat Maor, Israeli politician
- 30 May – Makram Khoury, Arab-Israeli actor, first Arab to win the Israel Prize
- 1 June – Menachem Froman, Israeli rabbi and political activist (died 2013)
- 5 June – Nechama Rivlin, First Lady of Israel (died 2019)
- 19 June – Leah Tsemel, Israeli lawyer
- 27 June – Ami Ayalon, Israeli politician and a former member of the Knesset for the Labor Party
- 3 July – Saharon Shelah, Israeli mathematician
- 5 July – Yosef Shapira, Israeli judge, current State Comptroller of Israel
- 25 July - Rachel Shapira, Israeli songwriter and poet
- 18 August – Yair Shamir, Israeli politician, businessman, and Air Force officer
- 30 August – Daniella Weiss, Israeli settlement movement activist
- 31 August – Itzhak Perlman, Israeli-American violinist and conductor
- 9 September - Shaul Gutman, Israeli academic and politician
- 29 September – Yair Garbuz, Israeli artist (died 2026)
- 30 September – Ehud Olmert, 12th Prime Minister of Israel
- 10 October – Miriam Adelson, Israeli-American philanthropist
- 14 October – Muki Betser, Israeli special forces officer, founder of the Shaldag Unit
- 9 November – Zevulun Orlev, Israeli politician
- 23 November – Assi Dayan, Israeli film director, actor, screenwriter and producer (died 2014)
- 27 November – Akiva Eldar, Israeli journalist
- 1 December – Rami Bar-Niv, Israeli pianist, composer, and author
- 22 December – Amiram Goldblum, Israeli chemist and political activist
- 31 December – Tuvia Tzafir, Israeli actor and comedian
- Full date unknown
  - Adina Bar-Shalom, Israeli educator, columnist, and social activist.
  - Yosef Amit, Israeli military intelligence officer who was convicted of spying for the United States (died 2025)
  - Erela Golan, Israeli politician
  - Amir Nachumi, Israeli Air Force general and ace
  - Eli Alon, Israeli anesthesiologist
  - Nitza Metzger-Szmuk, Israeli archaeologist
  - Mahmoud al-Zahar, Palestinian militant, co-founder of Hamas

== Notable deaths ==
- 22 January – Else Lasker-Schüler (born 1869), German-born Palestinian Jewish poet
- 23 January - Annie Landau (born 1873), British-born educator, head of the Tehilla-Evelina de Rothschild Secondary School, recipient of the OBE.
- 13 February - Henrietta Szold (born 1860), American-born Zionist leader, founder of Hadassah.
- 23 May - David Ma'aravi (born 1896), Russian (Ukraine)-born sculptor, painter, and composer.
- 11 June – Eliyahu Golomb (born 1893), Russian (Belarus)-born leader of the Jewish defense effort in Mandate Palestine and chief architect of the Haganah
- 20 July – Yohanan Levi (born 1901), German-born Palestinian Jewish Hebrew linguist and historian, specialising in the Second Temple period
- 13 October - Leon Yehuda Recanati (born 1890), Ottoman (Greek)-born businessman, banker, philanthropist, and Jewish community leader.
- 11 November – Yehoshua Hankin (born 1864), Russian (Ukraine)-born Zionist activist who was responsible for most of the major land purchases of the World Zionist Organization in Ottoman Palestine
