= 1940 in Mandatory Palestine =

- 1940 in the British Mandate of Palestine
«««
1939
1938
1937
»»»
1941
1942
1943
See also:
1940 in the United Kingdom

Events in the year 1940 in the British Mandate of Palestine.

== Incumbents ==
- High Commissioner – Sir Harold MacMichael
- Emir of Transjordan – Abdullah I bin al-Hussein
- Prime Minister of Transjordan – Tawfik Abu al-Huda

== Events ==
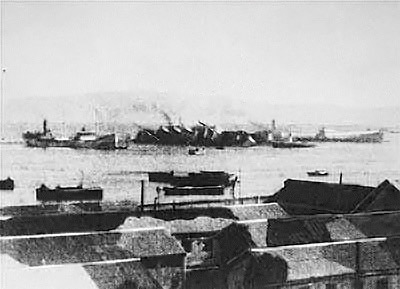
5 November:The "Patria" sinking in Haifa harbor

- 27 April – A friendly association football match between the national teams of Mandatory Palestine and Lebanon takes place at the Maccabiah Stadium in Tel Aviv; Mandatory Palestine beats Lebanon 5–1.
- June – The Zionist underground paramilitary group "Lehi" is established by Avraham Stern with the aim of forcibly evicting the British from Palestine.
- 9 September – The Italian Air Force bombs Tel Aviv causing 137 deaths.
- 25 November – The Patria, a French-built ocean liner, carrying approximately 1,800 Jewish refugees from Nazi-occupied Europe to Palestine, sinks in the Haifa harbour after a bomb carried covertly on board by the Haganah to explodes; 260 people are killed and another 172 injured.
- 12 December – The MV Salvador carrying some 327 Bulgarian Jewish refugees from Nazi-occupied Europe to Palestine, is wrecked in a violent storm in the Sea of Marmora, near Istanbul; 204 passengers including 66 children are drowned.

== Notable births ==
- 25 January – Avraham Lanir, Israeli fighter pilot, highest ranking Israeli Air Force pilot to fall into enemy hands (died 1973)
- 25 January – Giora Leshem, Israeli poet and publisher (died 2011)
- 26 February – Amos Kloner, Israeli archaeologist (died 2019)
- 29 February – Uri Milstein, Israeli historian
- 12 March – Eitan Haber, Israeli journalist (died 2020)
- 26 March – Haim Oron, Israeli politician
- 1 April – Amos Yaron, Israeli general
- 19 April – Yaron Ezrahi, Israeli political theorist (died 2019)
- 1 May – Elana Eden, Israeli actress
- 10 May – Zeidan Atashi, Druze Israeli politician and diplomat
- 29 May – Eliezer Shlomo Schick, Israeli Hasidic rabbi (died 2015)
- 6 June – Asa Kasher, Israeli philosopher and linguist
- 17 July – Faisal Husseini, Palestinian Arab politician and senior member of PLO (died 2001)
- 1 August – Ram Loevy, Israeli television director and screenwriter (died 2025)
- 4 August – Eliyahu Ben Haim, Israeli-American rabbi, prominent leader of the Sephardic Jewish community in New York City
- 15 August – Ze'ev Revach, comedian, movie actor, director (died 2025)
- 24 August – Yaron London, Israeli media personality, journalist, actor and songwriter
- 12 September – Amatzia Chen, Israeli general
- 3 October – Tamar Gozansky, Israeli politician
- 18 October – Uzi Even, Israeli scientist and politician, first openly gay member of the Knesset
- 20 October – Iftach Spector, Israeli fighter pilot
- 23 October – Fouad Twal, the Roman Catholic archbishop and Latin Patriarch of Jerusalem since June 2008
- 24 October – Yossi Sarid, Israeli politician (died 2015)
- 24 October – Dan Shilon, Israeli radio broadcaster, journalist, TV host and media personality
- 18 November – Haim Harari, Israeli theoretical physicist; President of the Weizmann Institute of Science
- 24 December – Shaul Amor, Israeli politician (died 2004)
- Full date unknown
  - Amin al-Hindi, Palestinian Arab, intelligence chief of the Palestinian National Authority (died 2010)
  - Laila Shawa, Palestinian Arab artist (died 2022)
  - Motti Ashkenazi, Israeli war hero of the Yom Kippur War and protest leader

== Notable deaths ==
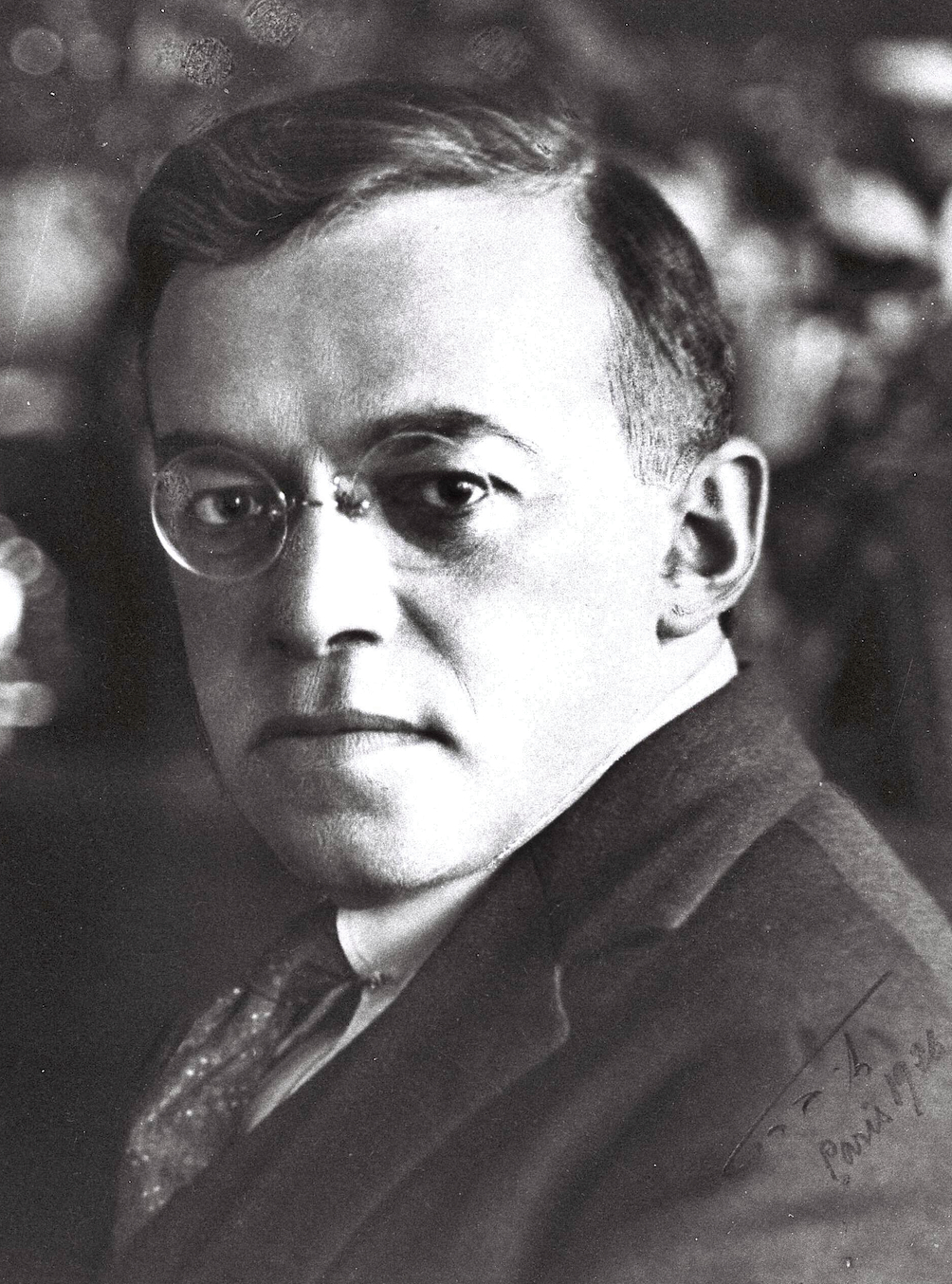
Ze'ev Jabotinsky

- 4 August – Ze'ev Jabotinsky (born 1880), Russian (Ukraine)-born Revisionist Zionist leader, author, orator, soldier, and founder of the Jewish Self-Defense Organization in Odessa
- 29 December – Dov Hoz (born 1894), Russian (Belarus)-born Zionist leader, founding member of the Haganah, and aviation pioneer
