= 1937 in Mandatory Palestine =

- 1937 in the British Mandate of Palestine
«««
1936
1935
1934
»»»
1938
1939
1940
See also:
1937 in the United Kingdom
Other events of 1937

Events in the year 1937 in the British Mandate of Palestine.

== Incumbents ==
- High Commissioner – Sir Arthur Grenfell Wauchope
- Emir of Transjordan – Abdullah I bin al-Hussein
- Prime Minister of Transjordan – Ibrahim Hashem

== Events ==
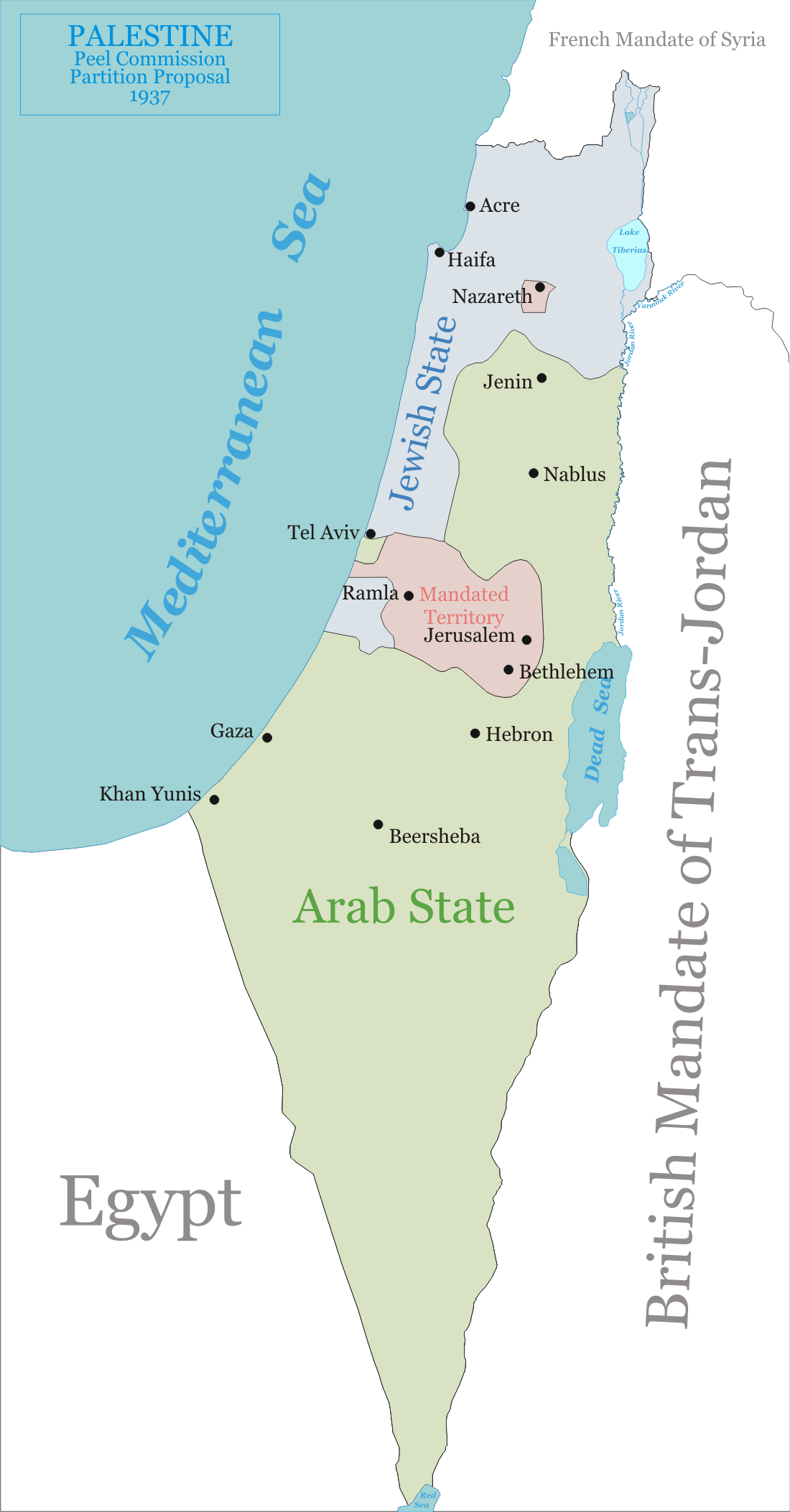
Peel Commission Partition Plan A, July 1937

- 5 January – The founding of the kibbutz Sde Nahum by members of the Sadeh group from the Mikveh Israel agricultural school, as well as Jewish immigrants from Austria, Germany and Poland.
- 31 January – The founding of the kibbutz Masada
- 25 February – The founding of Kibbutz Ginosar by a group of young socialists, on Palestine Jewish Colonization Association (PICA) land that had been leased to settlement of Migdal.
- 21 March – The founding of the kibbutz Sha'ar HaGolan by members of the Hashomer Hatzair youth movement from Czechoslovakia and Poland.
- 9 April – The founding of the moshav Beit Yosef
- 13 April – The founding of the moshav Mishmar HaShlosha
- 20 May – The founding of moshav Kfar Shmaryahu by German Jews
- 30 June – The founding of the kibbutz Tirat Zvi as part of the tower and stockade settlement enterprise. The founders were Jews from Poland, Romania and Germany.
- 4 July – The founding of the moshav B'nai B'rith
- 5 July – The founding of the kibbutz Ein HaShofet
- 6 July – The founding of the kibbutz Ein Gev
- 6 July – The founding of the moshav Tzur Moshe
- 7 July – The Peel Commission publishes a report that recommends the end of the Palestine mandate and its partition into separate Arab and Jewish states.
- 13 September – The founding of the kibbutz Kfar Szold
- 26 September – The British District Commissioner for the Galilee Lewis Yelland Andrews is assassinated in Nazareth by a gang of armed Arabs. His assassination was considered to represent the apex of the great Arab revolt in Palestine. Andrews's murder causes Britain to respond by outlawing the Arab Higher Committee.
- 1 October – Following the assassination of the British District Commissioner for the Galilee, the British authorities ban all Arab nationalist political organisations and arrests members of the Arab Higher Committee. Four of whom are deported to the Seychelles. Haj Amin al-Husseini and Jamal al-Husseini avoid arrest and leave the country.
- 9 November – The founding of the kibbutz Usha as a tower and stockade settlement by a Polish gar'in group.

== Births ==
- 5 January – Dan Tichon, former Israeli politician (died 2024)
- 20 January - Haim Hazan, Israeli basketball player (died 1994)
- 11 February – Eliezer Waldman, Israeli politician and rabbi (died 2021)
- 24 February – Shimon Elituv, Israeli rabbi (died 2023)
- 23 February – Raffi Lavie, Israeli artist and art and music critic (died 2007)
- 13 March – Zephaniah Drori, Israeli Rabbi and rosh yeshiva
- 16 March – Amos Tversky, Israeli cognitive and mathematical psychologist (died 1996)
- 26 March – Ahmed Qurei, Palestinian Prime Minister (died 2023)
- 4 April – Ya'akov Tzur, Israeli politician
- 6 April – Uzi Baram, Israeli politician
- 14 April – Efi Arazi, Israeli businessman (died 2013)
- May – Abu Nidal, Palestinian Arab, founder of Fatah – The Revolutionary Council, a militant Palestinian group, commonly known as the Abu Nidal Organization (died 2002)
- 28 June – Ahmed Yassin, Palestinian Arab, co-founder and leader of Hamas (died 2004)
- 30 June – Gideon Ezra, Israeli politician (died 2012)
- 11 July – Adin Steinsaltz, Israeli rabbi and scholar (died 2020)
- 20 July – Zalman Baruch Melamed, Israeli Rabbi and founder of the Arutz Sheva news service
- 5 August – Amir Drori, Israeli military officer (died 2005)
- 5 August – Dan Shomron, Israeli military officer, 13th Chief of Staff of the IDF (died 2008)
- 30 August – Yigal Cohen-Orgad, Israeli politician (died 2019)
- 3 September – Ruchama Marton, Israeli physician, psychiatrist, and political activist
- 6 November
  - Riah Hanna Abu El-Assal, Israeli Arab Anglican bishop
  - Hanna Siniora, Palestinian Christian businessman and politician
- 11 November – Yitzhak Ziv, Israeli politician
- 18 December – Moshe Sharon, Israeli historian
- 26 December – Eliezer Berland, Israeli rabbi
- Undated:
  - Arie Vardi, Israeli musician
  - Uzi Rubin, Israeli engineer
  - Abdul Rahman Ahmed Jibril Baroud, Palestinian Arab poet (died 2010)
  - Abu Daoud, Palestinian Arab politician and military commander, planned 1972 Munich Olympics massacre (died 2010)
  - Salman Abu-Sitta, Palestinian Arab researcher
  - Samir Ghawshah, Palestinian Arab, member of the PLO executive (died 2009)
  - Nahid al-Rayyis, Palestinian Arab politician and poet (died 2010)
  - Naim Ateek, Palestinian Christian priest, founder and head of the Sabeel Ecumenical Liberation Theology Center in Jerusalem.
  - Aliza Magen-Halevi, Israeli intelligence officer (died 2025)
