= Eitan Avitsur =

Israeli composer and conductor (1941–2018)

- איתן אביצור
- Born: 5 September 1941; Jerusalem, Mandatory Palestine
- Died: 24 February 2018 (aged 76)
- Education: Rubin Academy of Music; Mozarteum
- Awards: Jerusalem Award (2016)
- Musical career
- Genres: Classical
- Occupations: Composer; Conductor
- Years active: 1972–2018

Eitan Avitsur (Hebrew: איתן אביצור; 5 September 1941 Jerusalem – 24 February 2018) was an Israeli composer and conductor.

== Biography ==
Avitsur's formal education commenced with study for a teaching certificate in music theory (1967) and a degree in music composition and conducting (1972) at the Rubin Academy of Music. His studies were concluded in 1976 at the Rubin Academy, directed by Igor Markevitch and Salzburg's Mozarteum where he specialized in conducting. Commencing a professional involvement with Bar-Ilan University in 1972, he was appointed in 1987 as conductor of the Jerusalem Youth Orchestra.

In 2003, he created the foundations of the electro-acoustic music program which was developed under his tutelage, also establishing there a computer-music laboratory. In 2016 Avitsur won the Jerusalem Award for his life work in music educating thousands of students. In 1972 Avitsur was a founding member of the Music Department at Bar-Ilan University. He has created or composed more than three hundred works, including oratorios, cantatas, symphonies, chamber music and background music for more than two hundred movies and television programs.
