= Naomi Gal =

Israeli writer

Naomi Gal (Hebrew: נעמי גל; born Jerusalem, 1944) is an Israeli writer. Her novel Roman romanti (רומן רומנטי) (Tel Aviv 1993, in 2011 rewritten in English as Soap Opera), in its original Hebrew version won the Jerusalem Prize for Literature in 1994. In 1999 Ariel, an English-language Israeli literary magazine, counted Gal with Haim Be'er and Dan Tsalka "in the forefront of Israeli writers today". Gal worked in Israeli television and the newspapers Ma'Ariv and Yediot Ahronot for nearly two decades as a film critic and food writer before writing novels and children's books. She currently is a professor at Lehigh University in Bethlehem, Pennsylvania. She has also been classed as a feminist writer.

== Works ==
Hebrew:

- "There's a thinness" ("אין דבר העומד בפני הרזון")
- "Roman romanti" ("רומן רומנטי")
- "Story of Ruth and Jerry" ("הרומן של רות וג'רי")
- "Lilith" ("לילית")
- "Anti-Roman", ("אנטי-רומן")

English:

- Daphne's Seasons
- Soap Opera
