= Meir Teomi =

Mandatory Palestine actor

- מאיר תאומי
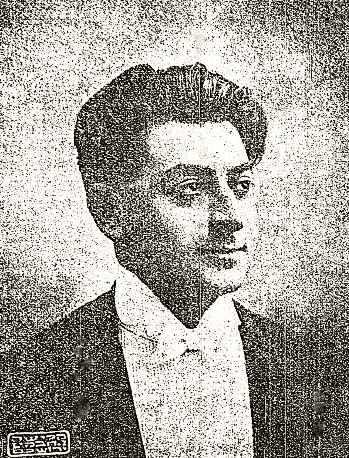
- Born: July 15, 1898; Mykolaiv, Podolia, Russian Empire
- Died: August 10, 1947 (aged 49); Tel Aviv, Mandatory Palestine
- Cause of death: Terrorist attack
- Occupation: Actor
- Years active: 1920–1947
- Children: Oded

Meir Teomi (Hebrew: מאיר תאומי; July 15, 1898 – August 10, 1947) was a Jewish actor in Mandatory Palestine who was murdered during a terrorist attack in 1947. He was the father of Israeli actor Oded Teomi.

== Biography ==
Teomi was born in Mykolaiv, then in the Russian Empire. He moved to Ottoman Palestine in 1913 and studied at the Herzliya Hebrew Gymnasium. He was expelled by the Ottoman authorities in 1915 during World War I due to his Russian citizenship and returned to Mykolaiv. He later moved to Kyiv to study law.

In 1919, he returned to Palestine aboard the Ruslan. He settled in Tel Aviv and started an acting career, joining the Hebrew Theatre in 1920. He participated in about 150 plays in Hebrew, wrote for Do'ar HaYom, and acted in two films. In 1927 he went on a European tour. He was married twice.

== Death ==
Teomi was performing on stage in the Hawaii Garden restaurant of Tel Aviv on August 10, 1947. An Arab gang from Al-Shaykh Muwannis stormed the cafe and shot five people dead, including Teomi. Time magazine reported that it may have been "the first serious attack by Arabs on Jews since 1939." The Arab Falastin newspaper incorrectly reported that the attack had been done by Yemenite Jews against Arabs, leading to a wave of Palestinian attacks against Yemenites. The Haganah also carried out reprisals against Arab targets it believed were responsible for the attack.

== Films and plays ==
- Sabra, 1933
- This Is the Land, 1935
