= Awad Saud Awad =

Palestinian writer and journalist (born 1943)

- Born: 1943 (age 82–83); Jubb Yusuf, Safad in Mandatory Palestine
- Occupation: Author

Awad Saud Awad (Arabic: عوض سعود عوض; born 1943) is Palestinian writer and journalist. He has published 18 books, 3 novels and 13 stories books and 2 studies books about Palestinian folklore.

== Life ==
Awad Saud Awad was born in 1943 in Jubb Yusuf, Safad in Mandatory Palestine.

His parents left their home and fled to Syria in 1948 because of the 1948 war. He lived in the Khan Al-Shih refugee camp operated by UNRWA.

He received a bachelor's degree in Art History from Damascus University in 1971.

In 1970, he married a Lebanese Palestinian woman, Mariam Al-Hamed. They lived their first three years in Khan Al-Shih camp until the war of 1973, when they left the camp and lived for about six years in Joubar. They then moved to Zamalka near Damascus with their children, two boys and three girls.

He worked as a teacher in the United Nations Relief and Works Agency for Palestine Refugees (UNRWA) in Damascus, Syria from 1968 to 1996, before he resigned from his work because of the bad treatment from the administration of UNRWA in Syria.

== Career ==
=== Short stories and novels ===
He started writing in the 1970s and he published his first book for children, A Journey to Andromeda Galaxy, in 1981. Since 1981, he has been a member of Palestinian Writers and Journalists Union in Damascus, Syria. He became a member of Arab Writers Union in Damascus in 1989. He was the president of the Association of the story and the novel in the Arab Writers Union – Damascus, Syria during the years 2005 to 2006 and 2009 to 2010. He was delegated by the Arab Writers Union to visit Turkey to provide a study on the history of Story at Syria in June 2008.

=== In the field of folklore and heritage ===
He participated actively in the establishment of celebrations for the Palestinian folklore week, which was conducted annually in Damascus, Syria during the 1980s, and he was the supervisor of the Palestinian Folklore Heritage artistic bands from 1988 to 1994. He founded the Palestinian Folklore Heritage Center in Damascus, Syria and he was the director of this center from1991 to 1996.

Awad Saud Awad is one of the important novelists in Palestine and in Syria, and he is one of the most important Arabic critics of the novel and the story in the modern era. His critical studies, which published in Arabic newspapers and magazines, are more than 200 critical studies of Arab writers from different nationalities. Moreover, he has many heritage publications in specialized periodical magazines. He conducted lectures in various Syrian provinces about the Story and Folklore.

== Publications ==
=== Novels ===
- The Midway Strangers, Awad S. Awad, Publisher: the Arab Writers Union, Damascus – 2006.
- The Blooming of Qandoul, Awad S. Awad, Publisher: the Arab Writers Union, Damascus 1997.
- The Farewell, Awad S. Awad, Publisher: the Arab Writers Union, Damascus 1987.

=== Studies ===
- Palestinian Folklore Expressions, Publisher: Dar Kanaan, Damascus 1993.
- Studies in Palestinian Folklore, Publisher: Department of Media and Education, Damascus 1983.

=== Story ===
- Palestinian Stories, Awad Saud Awad, published by the Arab Writers Union, Damascus 2024.
- The Embrace of the Butterfly and the Rose, Awad Saud Awad, published by the Syrian General Book Authority - Ministry of Culture, Damascus 2021.
- The Journey of the Sunrise Wave, Awad Saud Awad, short stories, published by the Arab Writers Union, Damascus 2021.
- Labyrinth of Love, Awad S. Awad, issued by the Ministry of Culture, Damascus 2019.
- A Nap of Ash, Awad S. Awad, Publisher: the Arab Writers Union, Damascus 2011.
- Henna Travel, Awad S. Awad, Publisher: the Arab Writers Union, Damascus 2009.
- Flood of Night, Awad S. Awad, Publisher: the Arab Writers Union, Damascus 2005.
- Postponed Joys, Awad S. Awad, issued by the Ministry of Culture, Damascus 2004.
- Lightings on the Wall of memory, Awad S. Awad, Publisher: the Arab Writers Union, Damascus 2002.
- The waiting, Awad S. Awad, Publisher: the Arab Writers Union, Damascus 1994.
- The Liberty Ship (for children), Awad S. Awad, Publisher: Dar el-Sheikh, Damascus 1988.
- Palm and Banana Tree (for children), Awad S. Awad, Damascus 1983.
- A Journey to Andromeda Galaxy (for children), Awad S. Awad, Damascus 1981.
