= 2022 deaths in the United States =

- Decades: 2000s; 2010s; 2020s; 2030s
- See also: History of the United States (2016–present); Timeline of United States history (2010–present); List of years in the United States

The following notable deaths in the United States occurred in 2022. Names are reported under the date of death, in alphabetical order as set out in WP:NAMESORT. A typical entry reports information in the following sequence: Name, age, country of citizenship at birth and subsequent nationality (if applicable), what subject was noted for, year of birth (if known), and reference.
