= Yitzhak Ziv =

Israeli politician

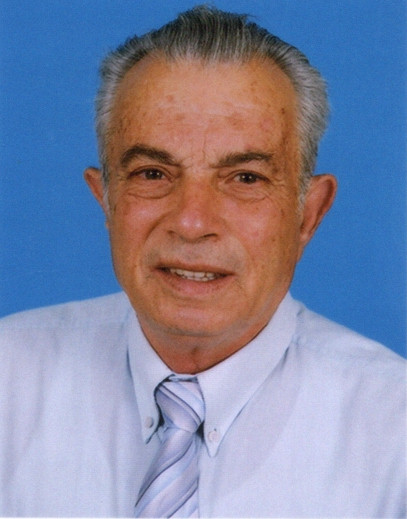
- Ziv in the 2000s

Faction represented in the Knesset
- 2006–2009: Gil

Personal details
- Born: 11 November 1937 (age 88) Tel Aviv, Mandatory Palestine

Yitzhak Ziv (Hebrew: יצחק זיו; born 11 November 1937) is an Israeli politician who served as a member of the Knesset for Gil between 2006 and 2009.

== Biography ==
Born in Tel Aviv during the Mandate era, Ziv today lives in Ramat Gan, and is widowed with three children.

For the 2006 Knesset elections he was placed fourth on the Gil list, and became a Knesset member when the party won seven seats. During his term he served as Deputy Speaker of the Knesset.

He lost his seat in the 2009 elections when the party failed to cross the electoral threshold.
