= Pain Clinic =

- Starring: Rich "Cashman" Jones; Danger Boy "The Artiste" Rob Sanderson "DC" Dan Cole
- Country of origin: United States

Production
- Producer: Rich "Cashman" Jones
- Running time: 60 minutes

Original release
- Network: FOX Sports 1280 Rochester
- Release: November 14, 1998 – present

The Pain Clinic is a pro wrestling talk show that airs Saturday mornings on FOX Sports 1280 Rochester in Rochester, New York.
