= Ze'ev Segal =

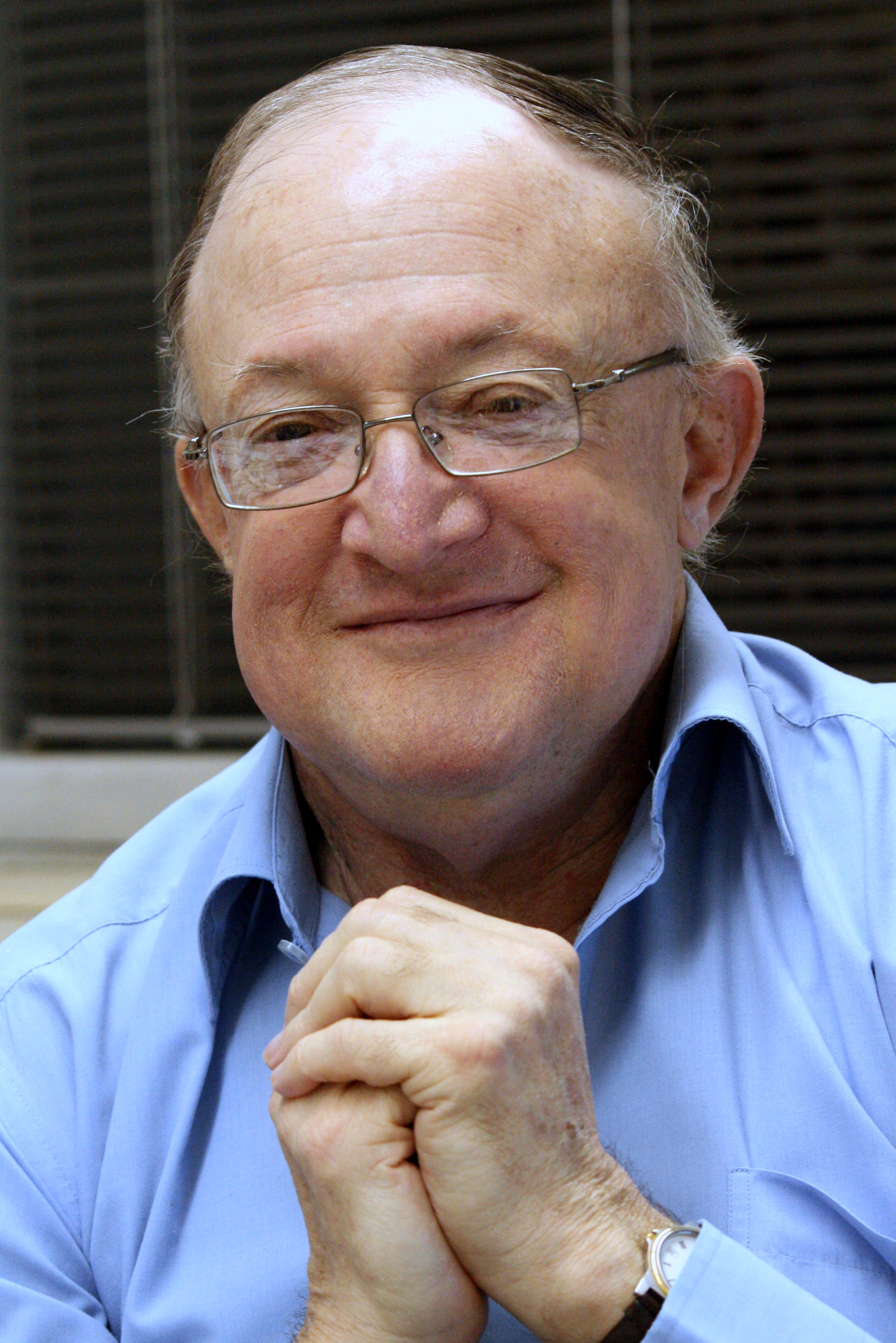
Ze'ev Segal

Ze'ev Segal (Hebrew: זאב סגל; 13 January 1947 – 11 January 2011) was an Israeli lawyer, a professor of law at Tel Aviv University and a legal analyst for the newspaper Haaretz.

Segal was born in Mandate Palestine. He served in the Israel Defense Forces as a military correspondent for the Gadna newspaper Bemachane Gadna in 1965–1968. Segal received an LL.M degree from Hebrew University of Jerusalem. In 1982, he received a doctorate in law from Tel Aviv University. He worked as an assistant to Shimon Peres when he was Minister of Communications and Transport.

== Journalism and legal career ==
In March 1973, several months before David Ben-Gurion died, Segal conducted the last comprehensive interview with Ben-Gurion. In 1985–1997, Segal served as an observer for the Israel Press Council and a member of its ethics tribunal. He was one of the drafters of the Kinneret Covenant (אמנת כנרת) which seeks to create a common ground for various currents in Israeli society (right-left, religious-secular). Segal was an associate of the Jerusalem Center for Public Affairs. He was also chairperson of the Israel Diaspora Forum at the World Zionist Organization and co-chairperson of the Forum of Law and Society.

== Legacy and commemoration ==
Israeli Prime Minister Benjamin Netanyahu described Segal as "an exemplary figure, a journalist who struggled to advance democracy, human rights and the rule of law."

== Published works ==
- The Right to Know in the Light of the Freedom of Information Act
- Freedom of the Press: Between Myth and Reality
- The Hatmaker: Discussions with Justice Aharon Barak (co-author Ariel Bendor)
