= European Journal of Pain =

- Discipline: Pain management
- Language: English
- Edited by: Luis Garcia-Larrea

Publication details
- History: 1997–present
- Publisher: Wiley-Blackwell
- Frequency: 10/year
- Impact factor: 3.492 (2019)

Standard abbreviations
- ISO 4: Eur. J. Pain

Indexing
- CODEN: EJPAFJ
- ISSN: 1090-3801 (print); 1532-2149 (web)
- OCLC no.: 44580241

Links
- Journal homepage; Online access; Online archive

The European Journal of Pain is the official journal of the European Pain Federation. According to the Journal Citation Reports, the journal has a 2018 impact factor of 3.188. The journal particularly welcomes clinical trials, which are published on an occasional basis.

Regular sections in the journal are:

- Editorials and Commentaries
- Position Papers and Guidelines
- Reviews
- Original Articles
- Letters
- Bookshelf

Research articles are published under the following subject headings:

- Neurobiology
- Neurology
- Experimental Pharmacology
- Clinical Pharmacology
- Psychology
- Behavioural Therapy
- Epidemiology
- Cancer Pain
- Acute Pain
- Clinical Trials
