= Ram Caspi =

Israeli attorney (1939–2025)

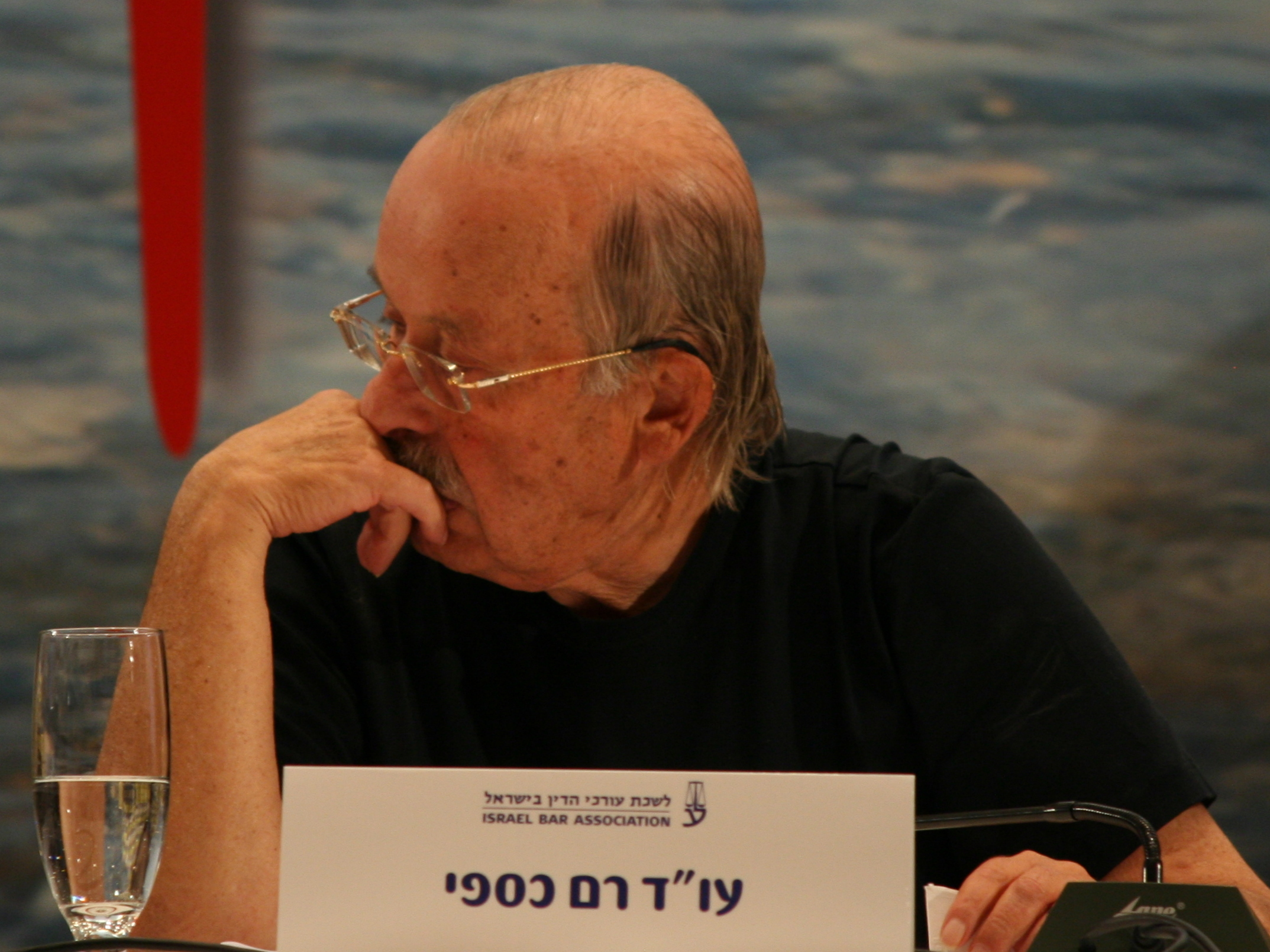
Ram Caspi in 2012

Ram Caspi (Hebrew: רם כספי; 19 August 1939 – 29 August 2025) was an Israeli attorney. He received his LL.M. (cum laude) from the Hebrew University of Jerusalem (1962), and was admitted to the Israel Bar in 1964.

Caspi's expertise was in international transactions and Mergers & Acquisitions, as well as in civil litigation. He also practiced Commercial and Property Law. He was the head of Caspi & Co. and son of the late Adv. Michael Caspi.

Caspi died on 29 August 2025, at the age of 86.
