= Israel Segal =

Israeli journalist and author (1944–2007)

Israel Segal (Hebrew: ישראל סגל; 26 May 1944 – September 27, 2007) was an Israeli journalist, author, and longtime political commentator.

== Biography ==
Segal was born in the Sha'arei Hesed neighborhood of Jerusalem in Mandate Palestine, in 1944.

After his start at Haolam Haze magazine, Segal moved first to Israel Radio, where he covered religious stories, and then on to a position as a lead anchor at Israeli Broadcasting Authority. Later, he joined Israel's Channel 2, operating as an editor and news anchor for the Reshet network. After his death in 2007, he was described as "one of the most influential journalists of the past three decades".

Segal's 2004 novel, My Brother's Keeper, a semi-autobiographical work, was a best-seller. He wrote four additional books.

== Bibliography ==
- Out of the womb (1964)
- Prophecy-man dies in the middle of gymnastics class (1988) (for children)
- To Fly like a Bird (1989) (for children)
- Neilah (1990) ISBN 965-07-0030-7
- One from the two of us (1995) ISBN 978-965-07-0504-6
- My brother's keeper (2004) ISBN 965-07-1292-5
