= Joseph Kastein =

Josef Kastein
- יוסף קסטין
- Born: 6 October 1890; Bremen, Germany
- Died: 13 June 1946 (aged 55); Haifa, Israel
- Other name: Julius Katzenstein

Josef Kastein (Hebrew: יוסף קסטין; 6 October 1890 – 13 June 1946), was a German-born writer and jurist.

== Biography ==
Julius Katzenstein (later Josef Kastein) was born in Germany. In 1926 he moved to Ascona, Switzerland. In 1935, he immigrated to Mandatory Palestine and settled in Tel Aviv.

In 1931, his book Eine Geschichte der Juden was published by Rowohlt Verlag in Berlin (and later translated into English, Hebrew and Dutch).

According to Douglas Reed, Kastein was a "zealous Zionist historian... who holds that the Old Testament was in fact a political programme, drafted to meet the conditions of a time, and frequently revised to meet changing conditions.... and that the Law laid down in the Old Testament must be fulfilled to the letter."

A wide range of works by Kastein were published between 1918 and 1942, including poetry, novels, and essays. There has been a revival of interest in his writing in the twenty-first century, with his memoir Was es heißt, Jude zu sein : eine Kindheit in Bremen [What it means to be a Jew: a childhood in Bremen] published in 2004 and a new edition of one of his novels, Pik Adam, published in 2017.

The Leo Baeck Institute holds two archival collections relating to Kastein, one in New York and one in Jerusalem. Both collections have been digitized.

== Published works ==
- Pik Adam. Roman. Berlin: Th. Knaur Nachf., 1927.
- Melchior. Ein hanseatischer Kaufmannsroman. Bremen, Friesen-Verlag, c1927.
- The Messiah of Ismir: Sabbatai Zevi. Translated by Huntley Paterson. New York, Viking Press, c1931.
- Eine Geschichte der Juden. Berlin, Ernst Rowohlt Verlag, 1931. (Reed. Vienna, Löwit, 1935).
- Jews in Germany. Translated from the German by Dorothy Richardson, with a preface by James Stephens. London, The Cresset press, 1934.
- Uriel da Costa, oder, Die Tragoedie der Gesinnung. Berlin, Rowohlt, 1932.
- Juedische Neuorientierung. Vienna, R. Loewit, 1935.
- History and destiny of the Jews. Translated by Huntley Paterson. Garden City, N.Y., Garden City publishing co., inc., 1936.
- Was es heißt, Jude zu sein : eine Kindheit in Bremen [What it means to be a Jew: a childhood in Bremen]. Edited by Jürgen Dierking and Johann-Günther König. Bremen: Edition Temmen, 2004.
- Pik Adam : Roman. Edited by Johann-Günther König. Bremen: Kellner Verlag, 2017.
