= Harold MacMichael =

British colonial administrator (1882–1969)

Sir Harold MacMichael GCMG DSO
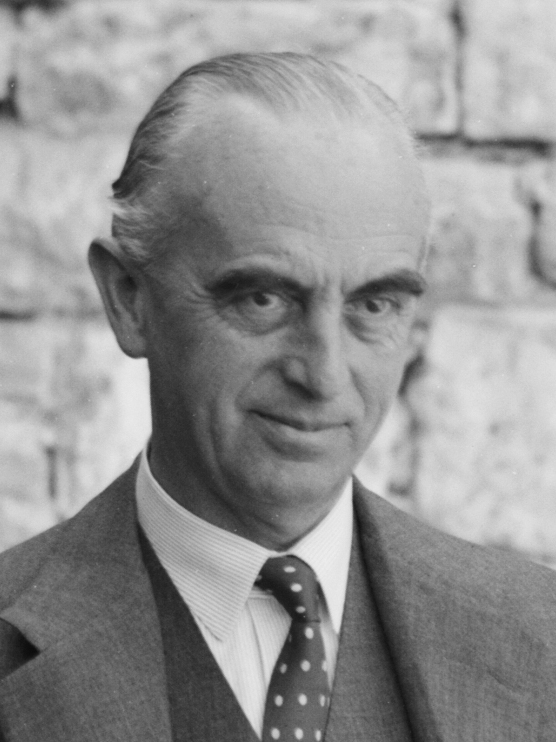

Governor of Tanganyika
- In office 19 February 1934 – 8 July 1938
- Preceded by: George Stewart Symes
- Succeeded by: Mark Aitchison Young

High Commissioner of Palestine High Commissioner for Trans-Jordan
- In office 3 March 1938 – 30 August 1944
- Preceded by: Arthur Grenfell Wauchope
- Succeeded by: The Viscount Gort

Personal details
- Born: 15 October 1882 Birchover, Derbyshire, England
- Died: 19 September 1969 (aged 86) Folkestone, Kent, England

Sir Harold Alfred MacMichael GCMG DSO (15 October 1882 – 19 September 1969) was a British colonial administrator who served as High Commissioner for Palestine.

== Early life and career ==
Educated at Bedford School, MacMichael graduated with a first from Magdalene College, Cambridge. After passing his civil service exam, he entered the Sudan Political Service in Anglo-Egyptian Sudan. He then served in the Blue Nile Province until 1915, when he became a senior inspector of Khartoum Province. He was awarded the Distinguished Service Order in the 1917 New Year Honours. He rose to the position of civil secretary in 1926. In 1933, he became governor of Tanganyika until 1937.

== High Commissioner of Palestine ==
The next year, he became High Commissioner of the British Mandate of Palestine. During his tenure, MacMichael was the target of seven unsuccessful assassination attempts, mainly by the Lehi Group (the Stern Gang). In the last, both he and his wife narrowly escaped death in an ambush that the Stern Gang had mounted on 8 August 1944, on the eve of his replacement as High Commissioner.

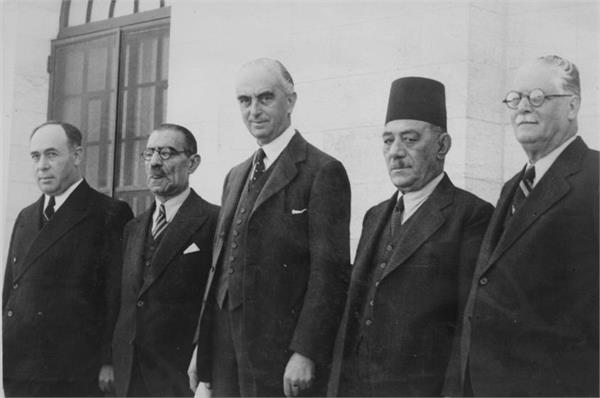
High Commissioner Harold MacMichael with mayors in Palestine, 1942. From left: Israel Rokach (Tel Aviv), Mustafa al-Khalidi (Jerusalem), MacMichael, Omar al-Bitar (Jaffa), Shabtai Levy (Haifa)

MacMichael also served a stint as High Commissioner of Malta.

== Malayan Union ==
The British Military Administration had set to task of reviving pre-war plans for centralised control over the Malay states within days after British Allied forces landed in Singapore on 5 September 1945.

MacMichael, who had completed his stint as High Commissioner of the British Mandate of Palestine, was empowered to sign official treaties with the Malay rulers over the Malayan Union proposal scheme. MacMichael made several visits to the Malay rulers, beginning with Sultan Ibrahim of Johor in October 1945. The Sultan quickly consented to MacMichael's proposal scheme, which was motivated by his strong desire to visit England at the end of the year. MacMichael paid further visits to other Malay rulers over the proposal and sought their consent over the proposal scheme. Many Malay rulers expressed strong reluctance in signing the treaties with MacMichael, partly because they feared the loss of their royal status and the prospect of their states falling into Thai political influence.

It has to be mentioned that the Sultans signed under duress. The British were intent on securing their agreement and were willing to depose any disagreeing Sultan if necessary. That all of the Malay Sultans signed with so little resistance can be attributed to a rather simple ploy by the British. They were privately told that if they resisted, an inquiry would be held into their relations, conduct and collaboration with the Japanese occupation during the war. The sitting rulers, many of whom were concerned that both their offices and social positions would be destroyed, quickly complied. Later, when their positions were confirmed and secure, many would complain that they had not been given the opportunity to consult with their state councils nor with each other. In the words of the Sultan of Kedah, "I was presented with a verbal ultimatum and a time limit, and in the event of my refusing to sign the new agreement,... a successor who would sign would be appointed".

The treaties provided that the British had full administrative powers over the Malay states except in areas pertaining to Islamic customs. The Malays strongly protested the treaties, which had the effect of circumscribing the spiritual and moral authority of the Malay rulers over which the Malays held high esteem. Communal tensions between the Malays and the Chinese were high, and the prospect of granting citizenship to non-Malays was deemed unacceptable to the Malays.

Opposition to the Malayan Union and MacMichael's perceived highhanded ways in getting the Malay rulers consent led to the birth of Malay nationalism in British Malaya.

== Honours ==
MacMichael was awarded the 3rd Class of the Order of the Nile in 1925, and the 2nd Class of the Order in 1931.

MacMichael was appointed a Companion of the Order of St Michael and St George (CMG) in the 1927 Birthday Honours, promoted to Knight Commander of the Order (KCMG) in the 1932 New Year Honours, and again promoted to Knight Grand Cross of the Orde (GCMG) in the 1941 New Year Honours.

He was appointed a Knight of the Venerable Order of St John in 1938.

== Family ==
MacMichael's daughter, Araminta, married the politician and business leader Toby Low, 1st Baron Aldington. His other daughter, Priscilla, married James Raynes, a US Navy officer.

== Works ==
- The Tribes of Northern and Central Kordofán (1912)
- A history of the Arabs in the Sudan and some account of the people who preceded them and of the tribes inhabiting Dárfūr (1922), vol. 1, vol. 2
