= List of high commissioners for Palestine and Transjordan =

High Commissioner of Palestine and Trans-Jordan
- Badge of the high commissioner of Palestine

- Flag of the high commissioner of Palestine

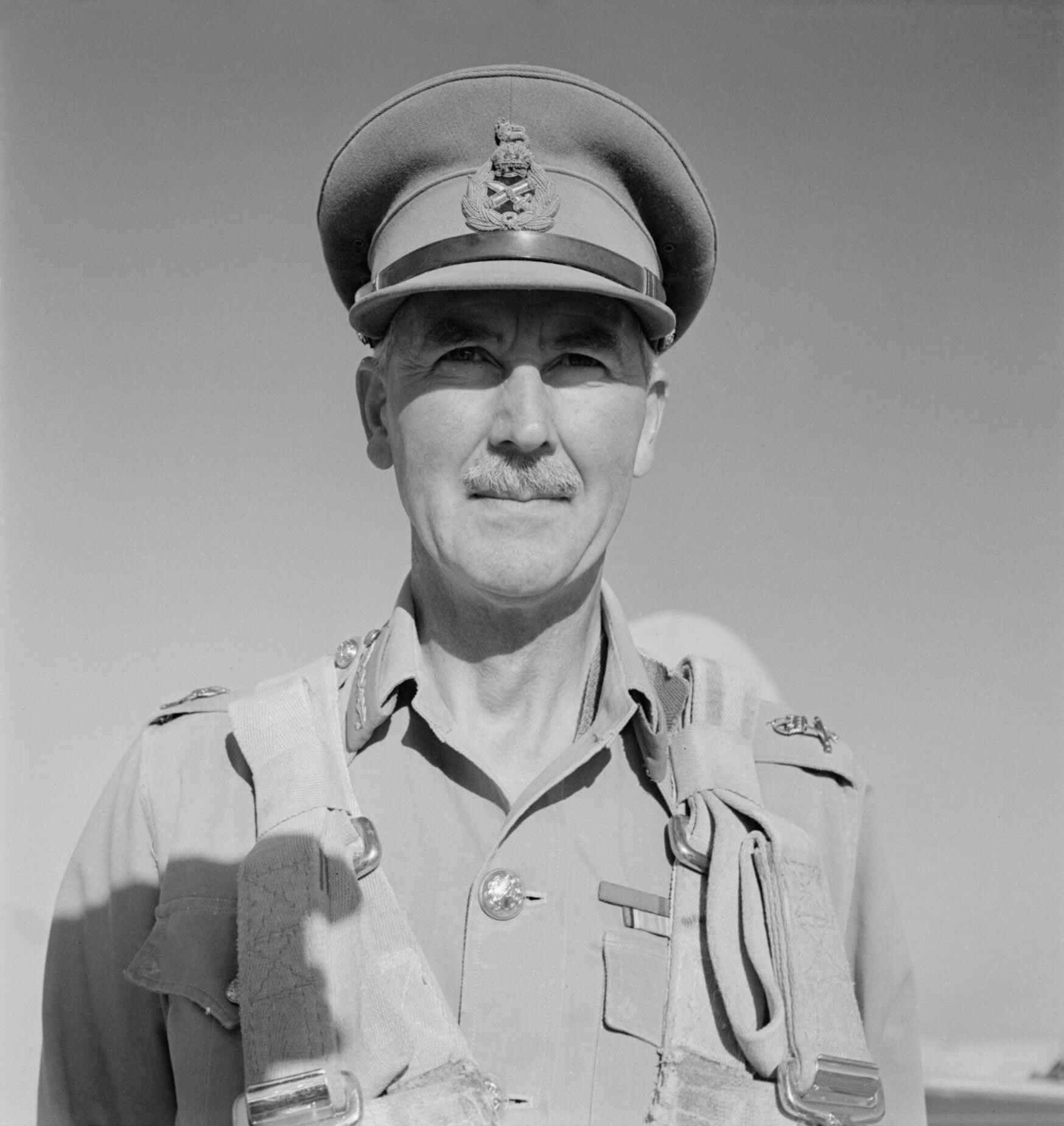
- Alan Cunningham, the last high commissioner for Palestine and Transjordan
- Style: His Excellency The Right Honourable
- Residence: Jerusalem
- Appointer: Monarch of the United Kingdom
- Formation: 1 July 1920
- First holder: Sir Herbert Louis Samuel
- Final holder: Sir Alan Cunningham
- Abolished: 14 May 1948

The high commissioner for Palestine was the highest ranking authority representing the United Kingdom in the mandated territories of Palestine, and the high commissioner for Transjordan was the highest ranking authority representing the United Kingdom in Transjordan. These posts were always held simultaneously by a single individual after the high commissioner for Transjordan was established in 1928. They were based in Jerusalem. The office commenced on 1 July 1920, before the commencement of the Mandate on 29 September 1923, and replaced the British military occupation under the Occupied Enemy Territory Administration, which had operated in Palestine in 1917–1918. The office ceased with the expiration of the Mandate on 15 May 1948.

== History ==
The British representative to Amman was "responsible to the high commissioner in his role as representative of the mandatory power, but not in his capacity as head of the Palestine administration." When the High Commissioner role was created, it was initially envisaged that the holder would fully oversee the British Mandate of Palestine and Transjordan, with the first High Commissioner Herbert Samuel asserting it. The British Foreign Secretary, Lord Ashton, disagreed on the grounds of cost. In 1921, it was declared that Transjordan would become a separate protectorate, severed from Palestine, with the High Commissioner retaining the original title but only holding discretionary powers in the area.

When the office of high commissioner was vacant, or the high commissioner was unable to perform his duties for some reason, a person who was usually the chief secretary of the government of Palestine was appointed to perform the same duties with the same powers.

On the last day of the British Mandate, the last High Commissioner for Palestine, Sir Alan Cunningham lowered the Union Jack at Haifa and left for British Cyprus at midnight of the expiration of the Mandate.

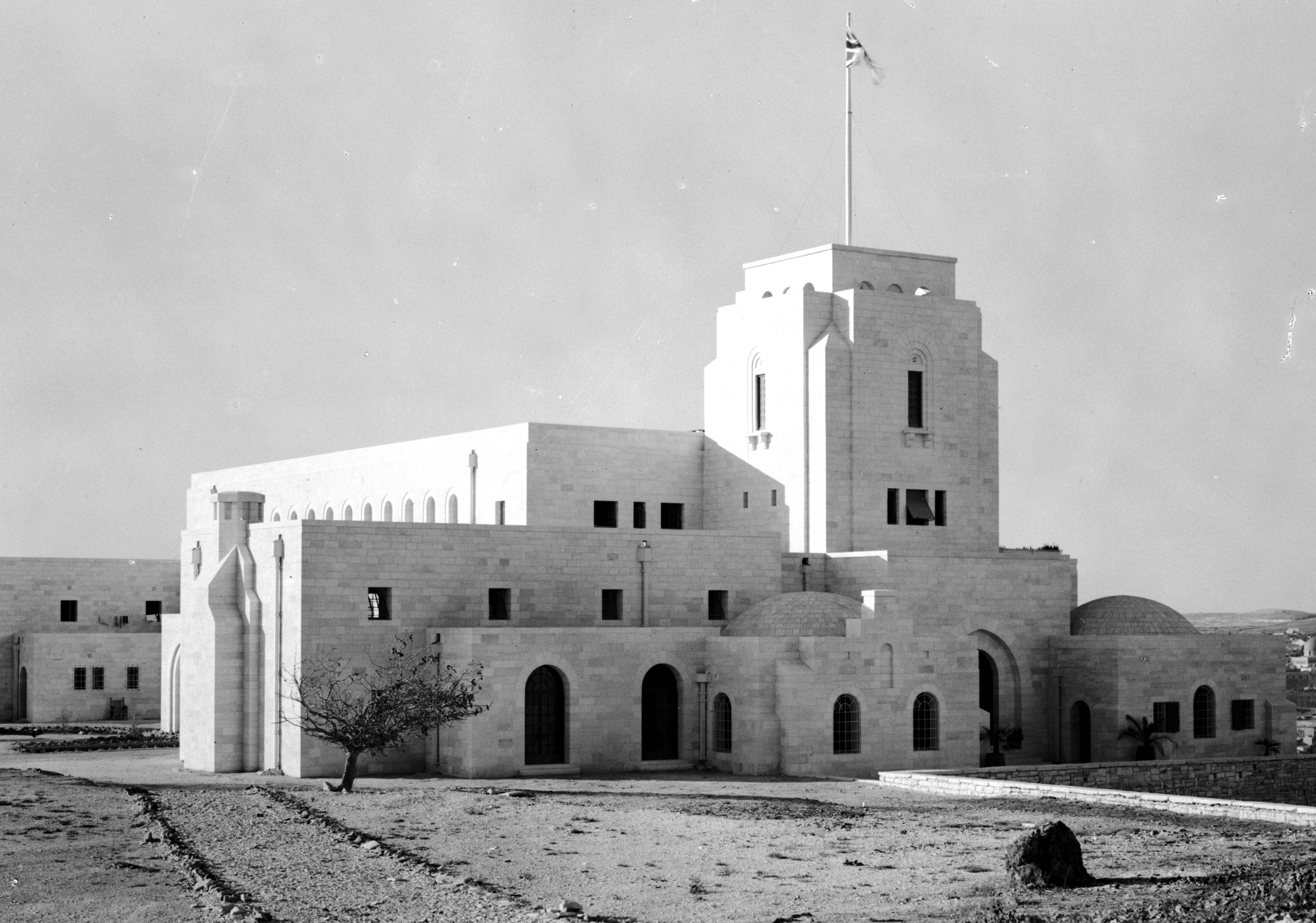
Government House, Armon Hanatziv neighborhood, Jerusalem

Appointment of Lord Plumer as High Commissioner for Palestine, 1925

== List of officeholders ==
Portrait	Name	Term of office			Notes
Portrait	Name	Took office	Left office	Time in office	Notes
	Sir Herbert Louis Samuel	1 July 1920	30 June 1925	4 years, 364 days	
	Sir George Stewart Symes	2 July 1925	25 August 1925	54 days	Acting
	Field Marshal Herbert Plumer, 1st Baron Plumer	25 August 1925	31 July 1928	2 years, 341 days	
	Sir Harry Charles Luke	31 July 1928	6 December 1928	128 days	Acting
	Sir John Chancellor	6 December 1928	3 September 1931	2 years, 271 days	
	Sir Mark Aitchison Young	3 September 1931	20 November 1931	78 days	Acting
	General Sir Arthur Wauchope	20 November 1931	1 March 1938	6 years, 101 days	
	William Denis Battershill	21 June 1937	3 March 1938	255 days	Acting for multiple periods
	Sir Harold MacMichael	3 March 1938	30 August 1944	6 years, 180 days	
	John Shaw	30 August 1944	31 October 1944	83 days	Acting
	Field Marshal John Vereker, 6th Viscount Gort	31 October 1944	5 November 1945	1 year, 5 days	
	John Valentine Wistar Shaw	5 November 1945	21 November 1945	16 days	Acting
	Lieutenant General Sir Alan Cunningham	21 November 1945	14 May 1948	2 years, 175 days	

== See also ==
- British Mandate of Palestine
