= Judaism and environmentalism =

Jewish environmental ethics and stewardship

Judaism and environmentalism intersect on many levels. The natural world plays a central role in Jewish law, literature, liturgy, and other practices. Within the arena of Jewish thought, beliefs vary widely about the human relationship to the environment. Movements such as Eco-Kashrut and celebrations like Tu BiShvat reflect environmental values, and modern Jewish environmentalism has grown, especially in North America.

== Jewish law and the environment ==
In Jewish law (halakhah), ecological concerns are reflected in several instances. These include, the Biblical protection for fruit trees, rules in the Mishnah against harming the public domain, Talmudic debate over noise and smoke damages, and contemporary responsa on agricultural pollution. The rule of Tza'ar ba'alei chayim is a restriction on cruelty to animals.

Since the 1970s, Conservative Judaism, has adopted Eco-Kashrut ideas. Jewish activists have also recruited principles of halakhah for environmental purposes, such as the injunction against unnecessary destruction, known as bal tashkhit. Some prophetic traditions speak of societal moral decadence causing an environmental disaster.

== Other Jewish beliefs about the environment ==
In Genesis, God instructs humanity to hold dominion over nature, and this is interpreted in terms of stewardship.

The Bible and rabbinic tradition touches on both anthropocentric and creation-centered, eco-centric perspectives. Many theologians regard the land as a primary partner of Jewish covenant, and Judaism, especially the practices described in the Torah, may be regarded as the expression of a fully indigenous, earth-centered tradition.

Eco-centric discussions of Judaism can be found in the work of modern scholars and rabbis, including Arthur Green, Arthur Waskow, Eilon Schwartz, Lynn Gottlieb, Mike Comins, Ellen Bernstein, and David Mevorach Seidenberg. According to David Vogel, Judaism does not support unchecked human domination of nature. It imposes numerous restrictions on the use of the natural environment, often reflecting eco-centric or biocentric values rather than purely anthropocentric ones.

In the weekly Torah portion of Vayishlach, before the story of Jacob wrestling with the angel occurred, Jacob had been going back across a river to fetch a few tiny jugs that were left behind. Highlighting Bal tashchit, the Torah directive to not waste, this principle serves as a guide for the organization's promotion of sustainable living practices.

The leader of Chabad, the Lubavitcher Rebbe, Menachem Mendel Schneerson, taught that the sun's energy was created for humanity's benefit and should be used constructively. In a statement made in 1981 during a gathering for the Birkat Hachama, the Rebbe declared solar power as the way into the future to harness renewable energy. In a 2019 article for J. The Jewish News of Northern California, journalist Philip Wexler discussed how the Rebbe's teachings are cited in contemporary Jewish approaches to climate change and environmental sustainability.

== Jewish practices and liturgy ==
In contemporary Jewish liturgy, ecological concerns have especially been promoted by adapting the kabbalistic ritual of conducting a seder for the New Year of the trees Tu Bishvat. Biblical and rabbinic texts have also been enlisted for prayers about the environment in all the liberal movements, especially in Reform Judaism and Jewish Renewal movements.

One primary Jewish environmental event is the Tu BiSh'vat seder, often labeled as 'Jewish Earth Day' and sometimes humorously called 'Tree B'Earthday.' Falling in early spring, two full moons before Passover, Tu BiSh'vat ("the 15th of the month of Sh'vat") generally coincides with the first sap rising in the fruit trees in Israel. Since this day was labeled the "New Year for the Tree" in rabbinic Judaism, 17th-century mystics created a ritual meal or seder of fruit and nuts for the day that celebrated the "Tree of Life" that sustains the universe. The Jewish National Fund (JNF) applied these motifs in the 1950s to champion Tu BiSh'vat as a day for planting trees in Israel.

The history of the seder also sheds light on the development of the Jewish environmental movement. One of the early moments of awakening to environmental issues in the Jewish community was when rabbis and Jewish activists drew on the symbolism of the Jewish National Fund campaigns to create the "Trees for Vietnam" reforestation campaign in 1971 in response to the use of Agent Orange by the US. In 1976, Jonathan Wolf in New York City created and led one of the first modern environmental seders, incorporating liturgy from the Kabbalists with information from Israeli environmental groups like Neot Kedumim ("Ancient Fields," a conservancy group devoted to Biblical species), and Society for the Protection of Nature in Israel.

By the late 1970s, Jewish groups were innovating rituals for Tu BiSh'vat that connected Biblical and rabbinic teachings with material from the Kibbutz movement or JNF and with current environmental concerns. In the 1980s, dozens of homemade Tu BiSh'vat liturgical books or haggadot, modeled after the Passover seder, were being used around the country to celebrate trees and to talk about local and national environmental issues, the earth, and ecology.

== Jewish environmentalism by country ==
=== United States ===
==== 1970s and 1980s ====
In North America, the movement was in many ways motivated by the revival of back-to-the-land values in the 1960s and 70s. Together with the influence of Zionist idealism, which emphasized returning to the land. After the 1967 Arab-Israeli war, which generated a huge outpouring of sympathy and identification with Israel among unaffiliated Jews, the motif of return to the land became a bridge that connected progressive Jewish activists with the Jewish community from which they were often estranged. In Israel, various initiatives, movements, and thinkers, like the JNF, the kibbutz movement, and Ahad Ha'am, were forerunners of Jewish environmentalism. These trends, however, were not always in line with an explicitly Jewish environmentalist understanding. The pioneers of environmentalism in the North American Jewish community were often deeply committed to vegetarianism. (This ideal can still be found in newer organizations like the Shamayim Va'aretz Institute and Farm Forward.) Notable among the early innovators of Jewish vegetarianism is Richard Schwartz, publisher of Judaism and Vegetarianism in 1982, followed by Judaism and Global Survival in 1984.

A large part of Jewish environmental work has also consisted of investing Jewish practice with ecological meaning through sermons, teachings, and books. Early writers, Eric Freudenstein and Rabbi Everett Gendler, influenced many activists and teachers through their teachings and farming. Rabbi Arthur Waskow is also one of the leaders in this area of exploration, starting with his 1982 work, The Seasons of Our Joy: A Modern Guide to the Jewish Holidays, which follows the liturgical calendar through the changes in the earth. (Waskow's work was part of a trend now called Jewish Renewal, which involved uniting values associated with 1960s or New Age spiritual countercultures with Jewish practice.) In the same year, David Ehrenfeld and Rabbi Gerry Serotta at Rutgers University organized the first-ever Jewish Environmental Conference. In 1983, Waskow founded the Shalom Center, which over time turned its energy from nuclear weapons to the environment. The Shalom Center is now one of the primary organizations in North America and the world that promulgates an activist ecological understanding of Judaism.

In 1988, Shomrei Adamah ("Guardians of the Earth") was formed as the first national Jewish organization devoted to environmental issues. Founded by Ellen Bernstein in Philadelphia, the group produced guides to Judaism and the environment, such as Let the Earth Teach You Torah (1992), which was one of the works that initiated the field of Jewish environmental education. Shomrei Adamah captured the imaginations of environmentally concerned Jews around North America and quickly supplanted groups such as L'OLAM in New York City on the national level. Even as regional groups like Shomrei Adamah of Greater Washington, DC (founded in 1990) sprung up to do grassroots organizing, however, the national organization pulled away from involvement with regional groups.

==== 1990s ====
Later, other regional groups like the Northwest Jewish Environmental Project in Seattle (NWJEP or NJEP), founded in 1997, took a different approach. While Jewish identification with the earth and Jewish environmental activism had gone hand-in-hand up until then, these new groups focused on making nature a source of Jewish identity and explicitly de-emphasized political activism. The roots of this approach can be traced back to Jewish hiking groups and to the national network of groups, such as Mosaic Outdoor Clubs of America (founded in 1988).

In 1993, The Coalition on the Environment and Jewish Life (COEJL) was formed to bring the Jewish environmental movement into the mainstream. COEJL filled the vacuum left by Shomrei Adamah, working with other religion-based groups, under the umbrella of the National Religious Partnership for the Environment (NRPE). COEJL was founded by three institutions: The Jewish Theological Seminary of America, the Religious Action Center of Reform Judaism, and the Jewish Council for Public Affairs (previously the National Jewish Relations Advisory Council). Jewish environmentalists are drawn from all branches of religious life, ranging from Rabbi Waskow's organization and The Shalom Center to the Orthodox educational group Canfei Nesharim.

The new generation of Jewish environmental organizations, including the farming and food movement, can be traced to the Teva Learning Alliance (formerly the Teva Learning Center), founded in 1994 by Amy Meltzer and Adam Berman at Camp Isabella Freedman in Connecticut to offer outdoor education experiences to Jewish day schools. Teva's initial curriculum drew on resources developed by Camp Tawonga, located in the California redwoods.

==== 2000s ====
Hazon was founded by Nigel Savage in 2000 with an inaugural bike ride across North America to raise money for Jewish environmental causes in North America and Israel. Since then, Hazon has expanded greatly. It has nurtured the Jewish food movement and the campaign to bring awareness of the Sabbatical year to the Jewish community throughout the world.

The Adamah Farming Fellowship was also founded in 2003 at IF (now called the Isabella Freedman Retreat Center) by Shamu Sadeh, an alumnus educator of the Teva program. In the past few years, Jewish environmental consciousness has poured itself into the farming movement, sparked by Adamah and the food movement, and focalized by Hazon.

Other efforts include Neohasid, founded by Rabbi David Seidenberg in 2005, Wilderness Torah, founded by Zelig Golden in 2009, and Eden Village Camp, first envisioned by Yoni and Vivian Stadlin in 2006 and opened in 2010. The Kayam Farm at Pearlstone, founded in 2006, also organized an annual conference on Jewish agricultural law.

ReJews, a 501(c)(3) nonprofit organization dedicated to promoting sustainability and social entrepreneurship, began as a 2012 grassroots recycling program founded by Henry Goodelman in an Aish HaTorah residence hall. The project gained early recognition when Jerusalem Deputy Mayor Naomi Tsur publicly commended the student-led effort and encouraged other residents to follow suit.

In 2013, Hazon, already the largest Jewish environmental organization in North America, merged with Isabella Freedman. Along with the proliferation of farming programs in North America, and a network of Jewish-community-based CSAs organized by Hazon, a movement has emerged to bring shechitah, kosher slaughter, back to the small farm, using humanely and sustainably-raised animals. Grow and Behold Foods (founded 2010) is the largest commercial purveyor of such meat. There is also wide interest in a kosher certification that would guarantee food is produced in an ethical manner.

In 2015, ReJews was highlighted by the White House for its sustainably made, steam-punk designed Hanukkah menorah to highlight the balance between industry and environmentalism. In 2016, ReJews received a grant from the UJA-Federation of New York in support of its "Williamsburg, Brooklyn Clean Up" event. The same year, Mishpacha covered ReJews in their 10 Questions segment, and it was revealed that Blue Moon (beer), Google, and Walgreens have participated as sponsors and supporters for the "Chosen Organizations" program.

Since 2024, ReJews has been a member of the New York State Energy Research and Development Authority (NYSERDA) Integrated Energy Data Resource (IEDR) Environmental Justice Stakeholder Working Group, and contributes to state efforts to ensure that clean energy data access and related benefits are equitably extended to disadvantaged and frontline communities. Chosen to participate through NYSERDA's Disadvantaged Communities (DAC) Stakeholder Services Pool, ReJews supports the IEDR initiative's goal of improving the transparency and usability of New York's energy data by helping expand access and enhance functionality for data mapping related to eligibility determinations and the identification of applicable government subsidies.

=== Israel ===
In Israel the Heschel Center for Environmental Learning and Leadership, and the Reform movement's Kibbutz Lotan, both founded in 1983, have had a long and lasting impact.

In 2001, the Green Zionist Alliance, now called Aytzim, was founded as the first environmental organization to ever participate the World Zionist Organization and its constituent agencies. Aytzim works from North America to educate and mobilize Jews around the world for Israel's environment and to support Israel's environmental movement.

From 2003 through 2008, Rabbi Carmi Wisemon, together with the Ramat Shlomo Community Council, the Israeli Ministry of the Environment, and the Municipality of Jerusalem, produced four journals named the Environment in Jewish Thought and Law, on the intersection between Halacha (Jewish law) and environmentalism written by Orthodox rabbinic scholars.

Teva Ivri, founded in 2009 by Einat Kramer, has led the Shmita Yisraelit movement and project.

Keren Hashviis, a group that supports Jewish farmers in Israel who obey Shmita laws, was founded in 2013.

The Interfaith Center for Sustainable Development, founded in Jerusalem in 2010 by Rabbi Yonatan Neril, works to promote environmental sustainability through faith-based education and interreligious cooperation.

Shorashim/Roots, a peace group founded in 2014 in the West Bank by both Israelis and Palestinians has focused its working on finding common ground on land issues.

=== United Kingdom ===
Jewish environmentalism was active in the UK by the early 2000s, when the Noah Project was in operation. The project partnered with the Board of Deputies of British Jews in 2002.

The Sadeh Farm in Kent is inspired by the work of Adamah.

The EcoSynagogue initiative advises synagogues throughout the UK on environmental audits and surveys in places of worship.

=== Australia ===
There are several organizations promoting environmental work in Australia, including the non-profit Jewish Ecological Coalition (JECO) organization in Melbourne, founded in July 2003. The Jewish Sustainability Initiative in Sydney that aims to promote the sustainable use of Earth's natural resources. Others include Mazon and Together for Humanity in New South Wales.

== See also ==
- Christian views on environmentalism
- Coalition on the Environment and Jewish Life
- Derech HaTeva
- Eden Village Camp
- Environmental issues
- Green Zionism
- Islamic environmentalism
- Jewish Veg
- Jewish vegetarianism
- Spiritual ecology
- Stewardship (theology)
  - Earth stewardship

== Bibliography ==
- Alexander Barzel. Matsa' u-matsav: ʻiyunim bi-tefisat ha-ṭevaʻ ba-maḥashavah ha-Yehudit Sifriyat "Helal Ben-Ḥayim". Tel-Aviv: Ha-Ḳibuts Ha-Meʼuḥad, 2004.
- Jeremy Benstein. The way into Judaism and the environment Woodstock, Vt.: Jewish Lights Pub., 2006. ISBN 1-58023-268-X; 978-1-58023-268-5.
- Anita Bernstein. Formed by Thalidomide: Mass Torts as a False Cure For Toxic Exposure Columbia Law Review, November, 1997
- Ellen Bernstein. The splendor of creation: a biblical ecology. Cleveland: Pilgrim Press, 2005. ISBN 0-8298-1664-X.
- Ellen Bernstein. Ecology & the Jewish spirit: where nature and the sacred meet Woodstock, Vt.: Jewish Lights Pub., 1998. ISBN 1-879045-88-5.
- Ellen Bernstein and Dan Fink. Let the earth teach you Torah : a guide to teaching Jewish ecological wisdom Wyncote, PA: Shomrei Adamah, 1992. ISBN 0-9632848-1-9.
- Matt Biers-Ariel, Deborah Newbrun and Michal Fox Smart. Spirit in nature : teaching Judaism and ecology on the trail Springfield, NJ: Behrman House, 2000. ISBN 0-87441-686-8.
- J. J. Boersema. Thora en stoa over mens en natuur : een bijdrage aan het milieudebat over duurzaamheid en kwaliteit Baarn: Callenbach, 1997. ISBN 90-266-0901-9.
- Chaya M. Burstein. The kids' catalog of animals and the earth. Philadelphia, PA: The Jewish Publication Society, 2006. ISBN 0-8276-0785-7.
- Jeremy Cohen. "Be Fertile and Increase, Fill the Earth and Master It": The Ancient and Medieval Career of a Biblical Text. Ithaca, NY: Cornell University Press, 1989.
- Mike Comins. A Wild Faith: Jewish Ways Into Wilderness, Wilderness Ways Into Judaism Woodstock VT: Jewish Lights Publishing, 2007.
- Molly Cone and Roy Doty. Listen to the trees : Jews and the earth New York: UAHC Press, 1995. ISBN 0-8074-0536-1.
- Irene Diamond and David Mevorach Seidenberg. "Sensuous Minds and the Possibility of a Jewish Ecofeminist Practice." Ethics and the Environment 4:2 (2000), 185-95; repr. as "Recovering the Sensuous through Jewish Ecofeminist Practice." In Arthur Waskow, ed. Torah of the Earth v.2, Woodstock VT: Jewish Lights Publishing, 2000, 245-260.
- Ari Elon, Naomi M. Hyman and Arthur Ocean Waskow. Trees, earth, and Torah: a Tu b'Shvat anthology. Philadelphia: Jewish Publication Society, 2000. ISBN 0-8276-0665-6.
- Eric G.Freudenstein. "Ecology and the Jewish Tradition." Judaism 19:4 (1970), 406–14; repr. in Milton R. Konvitz, ed. Judaism and Human Rights. New York: W. W. Norton, 1972, 265-74; and Marc Swetlitz, ed. Judaism and Ecology. Philadelphia, PA: Shomrei Adamah, 1990, 29-33.
- Manfred Gerstenfeld. Judaism, environmentalism, and the environment: mapping and analysis Jerusalem: Jerusalem Institute for Israel Studies : Rubin Mass, 1998.
- Robert Gordis. "Ecology in the Jewish Tradition" Midstream 28: Aug-Sep (1982), 202-21; repr. in Judaic Ethics for a Lawless World. New York: JTS, 1986; and Marc Swetlitz, ed. Judaism and Ecology. Philadelphia, PA: Shomrei Adamah, 1990, 47-52.
- Arthur Green. Seek My Face, Speak My Name. New York: Jason Aronson, 1994.
- Hadassah and Shomrei Adamah. Judaism and ecology: a Hadassah study guide in cooperation with Shomrei Adamah, Keepers of the Earth New York, NY: Dept. of Jewish Education, Hadassah, 1993.
- Daniel Hillel. The natural history of the Bible: an environmental exploration of the Hebrew scriptures New York: Columbia University Press, 2006. ISBN 0-231-13362-6.
- Aloys Hüttermann. The ecological message of the Torah : knowledge, concepts, and laws which made survival in a land of "milk and honey" possible South Florida studies in the history of Judaism. 199, Atlanta, Ga.: Scholars Press, 1999. ISBN 0-7885-0580-7.
- Ronald H. Isaacs. The Jewish sourcebook on the environment and ecology Northvale, NJ: Jason Aronson, 1998. ISBN 0-7657-9979-0.
- Eric Katz, "Faith, God, and Nature: Judaism and Deep Ecology" in Deep Ecology and World Religions: New Essays on Sacred Grounds, eds. David Landis Barnhill, Roger S. Gottlieb (Albany NY: SUNY Press, 2001), 155–61.
- David Krantz. "Jewish Energy Guide". New York, NY: Green Zionist Alliance and Coalition on the Environment and Jewish Life, 2014.
- Neal Loevinger, "Judaism, the Bible and Environmental Awareness" (York University, MA thesis, 1993), 36–7, 47–8.
- Merkaz ha-Yerushalmi le-ʻinyene tsibur u-medinah and Center for Jewish Community Studies. Jewish environmental perspectives. Philadelphia, PA: Center for Jewish Community Studies, 2001.
- Naḥum Raḳover. Environmental protection: a Jewish perspective. Policy study. 4, Jerusalem: Institute of the World Jewish Congress, 1996.
- Eduardo Rauch et al., eds. Special issues on ecology of The Melton Journal 24 and 25 (1991 & 1992).
- Aubrey Rose. Judaism and ecology. World religions and ecology. London, England; New York, NY, USA: Cassell, 1992. ISBN 0-304-32378-0.
- Or N. Rose, Jo Ellen Green Kaiser and Margie Klein. Righteous indignation: a Jewish call for justice Woodstock, Vt.: Jewish Lights Pub., 2007. ISBN 978-1-58023-336-1; 1-58023-336-8.
- Lillian Ross. The Judaic roots of ecology Miami, Fla. 4200 Biscayne Blvd., Miami 33137: Central Agency for Jewish Education, 1983.
- Yiśraʼel Rozenson. Ṿe-Hineh ṭov Meʼod. ha-Sidrah ha-yeruḳah. 2, Yerushalayim: Yeshivat "Bet Orot", 2001.
- Daṿid Salomon and Meʼir Zikhl. Ekhut ha-sevivah (eḳologyah) bi-meḳorot ha-Yahadut. Ramat-Gan: Proyeḳṭ ha-sh. u-t. be-Universiṭat Bar-Ilan, 1989.
- Earl Schwartz, Barry D. Cytron. Who renews creation. (Meḥadesh be-khol yom tamid maʻaśeh ve-reshit) New York, N.Y.: National Youth Commission, United Synagogue of Conservative Judaism, 1993.
- Eilon Schwartz. "Bal Tashchit: A Jewish Environmental Precept" in Environmental Ethics 18 (Winter 1997): 355–74 (repr. in Trees, Earth, and Torah, 83–106).
- Eilon Schwartz. "Judaism and Nature: Theological and Moral Issues to Consider While Renegotiating a Jewish Relationship to the Natural World" in Judaism 44:4 (1985): 437–47, reprinted in Waskow, Torah of the Earth, vol.2 (see n.22) and Judaism and Environmental Ethics, ed. Martin Yaffe (Lanham MD: Lexington Books, 2001), 297–308.
- Richard H. Schwartz Judaism and Global Survival, first published in 1984, 2nd edition by Lantern Books, New York, 2002. ISBN 1930051875
- David Mevorach Seidenberg. Kabbalah and Ecology: God's Image in the More-Than-Human World. New York: Cambridge University Press, 2015.
- Tsevi Shinover and Yitsḥaḳ Goldberg. Ekhut ha-ḥayim ṿeha-sevivah bi-meḳorot ha-Yahadut. Neḥalim: Hotsaʼat "Mofet", 1993.
- Nosson Slifkin. Seasons of life: the reflection of the Jewish year in the natural world. Torah universe. Southfield, MI; Nanuet, NY: Targum Press in conjunction with Mishnas Rishonim; Distributed by Feldheim, 1998. ISBN 1-56871-110-7.
- Ora R. Sheinson. Lessons from the Jewish Law of Property Rights for the Modern American Takings Debate Columbia Journal of Environmental Law, 2001
- Ruth Sonshine, Jonathan Reiss, Daniel Pollack, Karen R. Cavanaugh. "Liability For Environmental Damage : An American And Jewish Legal Perspective," Temple Environmental Law & Technology, Fall, 2000
- David E. Stein. A Garden of Choice Fruit: 200 Classic Jewish Quotes on Human Beings and the Environment Wyncote, Pa.: Shomrei Adamah, 1991. ISBN 0-9632848-0-0. (Link is to the first edition.)
- Hava Tirosh-Samuelson, "Judaism", in The Oxford Handbook of Religion and Ecology, ed. Roger S. Gottlieb (New York: Oxford University Press, 2006).
- Hava Tirosh-Samuelson. Judaism and ecology: created world and revealed word. Religions of the world and ecology. Cambridge, Mass: Center for the Study of World Religions, Harvard Divinity School, 2002. ISBN 0-945454-35-X; 0-945454-36-8.
- Albert Vorspan and David Saperstein. Jewish dimensions of social justice : tough moral choices of our time New York, NY: UAHC Press, 1998. ISBN 0-8074-0650-3.
- Arthur Ocean Waskow. Torah of the earth: exploring 4,000 years of ecology in Jewish thought Two volumes. Woodstock, Vt.: Jewish Lights Pub., 2000. ISBN 1-58023-086-5; 1-58023-087-3.
- Tony Watling. Ecological Imaginations in the World Religions: An Ethnographic Analysis, London and New York: Continuum International Publishers, 2009.
- Carmi Wisemon. "The Environment in Jewish Thought and Law, Volumes I-IV, Sviva Israel, Beit Shemesh 2004-2008
- Martin D. Yaffe. Judaism and environmental ethics: a reader Lanham, Md.: Lexington Books, 2001. ISBN 0-7391-0117-X; 0-7391-0118-8.

=== Curricula and teaching resources ===
- Food for Thought: Hazon's Sourcebook on Jews, Food & Contemporary Life
- David Seidenberg, neohasid.org. "The Rainbow Day Curriculum to Celebrate the Rainbow Covenant"
- The Hazon Shmita Sourcebook
- Noam Dolgin. Elijah's Covenant Between the Generations - Climate Change Curriculum for Grades 7 - 11, published by the Shalom Center.
- Noam Dolgin. Whole School Environmental Curriculum - Varied environmental instant lessons for Grades 1 - 8, published by Torah Aura.
- Nigel Savage & Anna Stevenson. Food for Thought: Hazon's Sourcebook on Jews, Food & Contemporary Life - Sourcebook on Jewish Food Ethics, published by Hazon.
- Jewcology - a broad collection of resources and curricula from many contributors throughout the Jewish environmental movement
