= 1948 in Palestine =

1948 in Palestine may refer to:

- 1948 in Mandatory Palestine, events in the year 1948 in the British Mandate of Palestine.
- 1948 in All-Palestine (Gaza), events in the year 1948 in the All-Palestine Government in Gaza Strip under Egyptian patronage.
- 1948 in Israel, events in the year 1948 in Israel.
