= Aytzim =

American environmental organization

- Named after: trees
- Formation: 1999/2001
- Tax ID no.: 20-3460771
- Legal status: 501(c)(3) nonprofit NGO
- Purpose: Jewish environmentalism, Green Zionism
- Headquarters: New York City
- Location: California; Maryland; New Jersey; Budapest; Israel
- Region served: Worldwide
- Methods: Education, Advocacy and Public-Policy Formation
- Fields: Sustainability, Nature, Conservation, Water, Energy, Biodiversity, Ecology, Climate Change, Judaism and Israel
- Website: aytzim.org, jewcology.org

Aytzim (meaning "trees" in Hebrew), formerly the Green Zionist Alliance (GZA), is a New York–based Jewish environmental organization that is a U.S.-registered 501(c)(3) tax-deductible nonprofit charity. A grassroots all-volunteer organization, Aytzim is active in the United States, Canada and Israel. The organization is a former member of the American Zionist Movement and has worked in partnership with Ameinu, the Coalition on the Environment and Jewish Life (COEJL), Hazon, Interfaith Moral Action on Climate, Interfaith Oceans, GreenFaith, Mercaz/Masorti (Conservative Judaism), the National Religious Coalition on Creation Care, and the Jewish National Fund (JNF)—although Aytzim has long criticized JNF for not prioritizing sustainability and environmental justice in its actions. Aytzim's work at the nexus of Judaism, environmentalism and Zionism has courted controversy from both Jewish and non-Jewish groups (see below section on criticism).

== Projects ==
Aytzim has five projects:

- EcoJews of the Bay: EcoJews holds Jewish-environmental events in the San Francisco Bay Area.
- Green Zionist Alliance: The Grassroots Campaign for a Sustainable Israel (The organization's former name is now used as a project name.) The Green Zionist Alliance works on issues related to the environment of Israel and the Middle East.
- Jewcology: Home of the Jewish Environmental Movement: Jewcology.org is an online resource for information on Jewish environmentalism, and includes resources such as a job board and an interactive map of Jewish environmental initiatives.
- Jews of the Earth: Jews of the Earth organizes Jews locally and nationally for environmental action.
- Shomrei Breishit: Rabbis and Cantors for the Earth: An environmental-advocacy group that Aytzim runs in partnership with GreenFaith, Shomrei Breishit includes more than 100 Jewish clergy, including chief rabbis.

Aytzim also runs an internship program; hosts an English-language compilation of educational materials, research papers, academic papers, news articles, videos and books about Israel's environment; has student chapters, including "Yovel: Aytzim at NYU"; and runs occasional conferences and weekend retreats.

== Criticism ==
Aytzim has been criticized (predominately by the conservative Hudson Institute historian Arthur Herman) for its stance against hydrofracking, with Herman labeling the GZA in the New York Post as "running against the tide of technology". The organization also has been criticized for its support of environmentalism and tikkun olam. Others have been critical of Aytzim's stance against BDS; for greenwashing Israel; for participating in the People's Climate March; for associating with Israel and Zionism; for working with the Jewish National Fund; and for its participation in a process that largely favors Israel's political status quo. Some individuals have criticized the GZA for its promotion of community gardens, charging that making community gardens more widely available is patronizing to the public. Others see Zionism's mission as finished with the establishment of the modern state of Israel and they question the relevance of the entire system of legacy Zionist organizations formed by the World Zionist Organization and its constituent agencies.

== History ==
In response to perceived negligence in environmentally stewarding the land of Israel, as philosopher Martin Buber first observed, the Green Zionist Alliance (GZA) was founded in 2001 by Alon Tal, Eilon Schwartz and Rabbi Michael Cohen, with a large team of other volunteers, including Adam Werbach, Devra Davis and current Aytzim leadership—although its Jews of the Earth project originally was founded by Daniel Ziskin as an independent nonprofit in 1999 and merged into Aytzim in 2019.

In 2002 the GZA became the first environmental party at the World Zionist Congress, where it has had elected representation since and until the start of the 38th Congress. Through this process, the organization succeeded in the appointment of environmental leaders, including Tal and Schwartz, to the board of the Keren Kayemet L'Yisrael (KKL / Jewish National Fund in Israel). For more than a dozen years, Aytzim representation had included Tal and Orr Karassin.

In 2006 the GZA incorporated as a 501(c)(3) nonprofit.

In late September 2014, the GZA acquired Jewcology.org from fellow Jewish-environmental group Canfei Nesharim and, in partnership with GreenFaith, launched a Jewish-clergical environmental advocacy group called Shomrei Breishit: Rabbis and Cantors for the Earth. To better reflect the scope of the organization's work, the GZA rebranded itself as Aytzim, keeping the Green Zionist Alliance name both legally and for its Israel-focused work.

Aytzim has had many prominent Jewish leaders serve on its Green Zionist Alliance slates for the World Zionist Congress, including Rabbi Ellen Bernstein, Mirele Goldsmith, Susannah Heschel, Nigel Savage, Rabbi Fred Scherlinder Dobb, Richard Schwartz, Rabbi Marc Soloway, Rabbi Lawrence Troster, Rabbi Arthur Waskow and Laurie Zoloth.

The Aytzim advisory board includes former Jerusalem Deputy Mayor Naomi Tsur and Daniel Orenstein, a faculty member at the Technion Israel Institute of Technology and the Arava Institute for Environmental Studies.

== Activities ==
Since its founding as the Green Zionist Alliance, Aytzim has been a factor in the greening of Israeli policy—both internally and in its interactions with other countries—although that greening has led to charges of greenwashing, as discussed above. Still, as an all-volunteer organization, Aytzim's accomplishments include quadrupling funding for afforestation; building new bicycle lanes in Israel; developing an environmental program for villagers in Rwanda; saving the unique ecosystem of the Samar sand dunes in the Arava Valley from destruction; and helping Israel transition from incandescent to energy-efficient lighting.

Aytzim has worked to green the activities of quasi-governmental organizations, such as legacy Zionist organizations Jewish National Fund and the Jewish Agency, including the installation of rooftop energy-generating solar panels and indoor energy-efficient lighting; the planned transition of vehicles in their fleets to high fuel-efficiency and alternative-fuel models; the development of seven-year environmental plans, inspired by the shmita sabbatical cycle, to reduce greenhouse-gas emissions in Israel; the inclusion of environmental education for new immigrants to Israel; the development of community gardens at immigrant-housing centers; and increased support for in-country carbon-mitigating projects and local organic agriculture.

Aytzim also has been active in addressing energy issues in Israel, including a successful effort to stop hydrofracking of oil shale in Israel's Elah Valley, and to ban all fossil-fuel extraction on land owned by the Jewish National Fund in Israel, as well as a successful effort to increase the public share of profits from Israel's offshore natural-gas fields.

Working with partners, Aytzim has been engaged in campaigns to both protect and educate about the environment, including publication of the Jewish Energy Guide, a 50-article book on energy issues from a Jewish perspective produced in partnership with the Coalition on the Environment and Jewish Life; development of an Ethic of the Seas in partnership with the National Religious Coalition on Creation Care; filing an amicus brief with the U.S. Court of Appeals for the District of Columbia Circuit in the "Our Children’s Trust" case; support for the Green New Deal and a green stimulus to support the economy in the wake of the 2019-2020 coronavirus crisis; support for the Black Lives Matter movement; support for Earth Day, youth climate strikes and the Global Climate Strike; support for a cross-country Jewish environmental-education campaign led by Hazon; support for finalization of the U.S. Environmental Protection Agency's Carbon Pollution Standard for New Power Plants; support for inclusion of greenhouse gases in consideration of the Endangered Species Act; endorsing a Jewish community-wide transition from fossil fuels to clean, renewable energy; supporting efforts to combat antisemitism; and an effort to support Israel's forests in the wake of the 2010 Mount Carmel forest fire.

Additionally, Aytzim has been active in working with partners to hold events, such as the "Forward on Climate" initiative (with 160 other groups, including primary organizers the Sierra Club, 350.org and the Hip Hop Caucus); the Food & Water Watch-organized New Yorkers Against Fracking coalition (with musician Natalie Merchant, actor Mark Ruffalo and more than 200 other groups – including MoveOn, Friends of the Earth and the Indigenous Environmental Network); the People's Climate March in both 2014 (New York) and 2017 (Washington) (with hundreds of other groups); the March for a Clean Energy Revolution in Philadelphia (with hundreds of other groups); and the Sacred Earth project (with a dozen other faith-based environmental organizations, including Franciscan Action Network and GreenFaith).

Some of Aytzim's efforts with partners were initially successful but ultimately failed, such as its partnership with 14 other Jewish organizations—including Hazon, COEJL and the Religious Action Center—in founding the Green Hevra, a now-dormant network of Jewish-environmental organizations, and an effort to develop a now-dormant network of individuals, organizations and communities working to create a healthier and more sustainable world rooted in the values of the shmita cycle.

Other efforts by Aytzim have been unsuccessful, including its attempt to prevent further demolition of the Bedouin village of Al Arakib in Israel's Negev region; its opposition to Israel's "Nation-State Bill"; its opposition to cuts to the Supplemental Nutrition Assistance Program (SNAP) proposed in the U.S. Farm Bill; an effort to green the General Assembly of the Jewish Federations of North America; and an effort to protect labor unions in the Janus v. AFSCME U.S. Supreme Court case.
