= Steve Gutow =

American rabbi, lawyer, community activist and Jewish leader

Rabbi Steve Gutow
- Citizenship: United States
- Education: University of Texas at Austin (JD); Reconstructionist Rabbinical College
- Occupations: Rabbi, activist
- Known for: former President and CEO of the Jewish Council for Public Affairs

Steve Gutow is an American rabbi, lawyer, community activist, and Jewish leader. He is a visiting scholar at NYU’s Robert F. Wagner Graduate School of Public Service and co-director of the Religious Leadership and Civic Engagement initiative. He formerly served as the president and CEO of the Jewish Council for Public Affairs (JCPA).

== Background ==
Rabbi Gutow is a community and political organizer and Jewish community leader who has mobilized the Jewish community and built grassroots coalitions across multiple faith groups to advocate on a broad range of issues including preventing hunger, building interfaith relations, promoting civil discourse in public life, and protecting the security of Israel. He has specifically led national initiatives to encourage the United States government to take firm stands against Iran acquiring nuclear weapons, to end the genocide in Darfur, to maintain and enhance anti-poverty programs, and to create a sustainable environment within American and Jewish life.

Rabbi Gutow is a Dallas native, born February 25, 1949, to Albert and Ruthe Gutow, who moved to Texas from Detroit and had four children in Dallas. Steve’s younger brother Andrew and his sister Marsha Gutow are both deceased and his older brother William Gutow, married to Barbara Gutow, is a retired Dallas businessman.

== Education ==
Gutow attended the University of Michigan and then the University of Texas at Austin where he earned an undergraduate degree in history in 1970, and a Juris Doctor in 1977. He is a member of the Texas Bar Association and practiced with the firm of Gutow, Albach, and Blume in Dallas from 1980-1990. Gutow attended the University of Texas at Austin where he earned an undergraduate degree in history in 1970, and a Juris Doctor in 1977.

He graduated from the Reconstructionist Rabbinical College in Wyncote, Pennsylvania in 2003 and received the degree of Master of Hebrew Letters.

Gutow and his friends began playing what would become a yearly “classic” football game at the Dallas Jewish Community Center field in 1964 and have played there every year since but one. In 2014, when the group played its fiftieth such game, a movie was made of the game’s history and both local and national newspapers wrote stories.

== Career ==
Gutow was also the founding executive director of the National Jewish Democratic Council (NJDC). Begun in 1990, NJDC served as the national voice of Jewish Democrats for three decades. Under his leadership, the organization formed chapters in more than two dozen communities around America. An analysis of the 1992 presidential vote shows that despite Jews having made up only 2.4% of the U.S. population then and but 4% of the vote that year, Jewish Democrats nonetheless theoretically provided the winning margin for Bill Clinton over incumbent president George H.W. Bush in the key states of Georgia and New Jersey.

Gutlow then served as the chair and chief professional officer of the Texas Democratic Party coordinated campaign in 1995-1996, as well as the leader of the 21st Century Democrats during that same period.

In August 2005, Rabbi Gutow was named executive director of the Jewish Council for Public Affairs (JCPA), the national coordinating and advisory body for the 14 national and 125 local agencies comprising the field of Jewish community relations. He became the organization's president and CEO in 2009, serving through the end of 2015.

Under Rabbi Gutow's leadership, the JCPA was a stalwart advocate for a strong U.S.-Israel relationship with a focus on preventing Iran from acquiring nuclear weapons, an action that brought him to numerous small communal White House meetings with the president. During his tenure, the JCPA grew from an email list of 6,000 names to its current list of more than 100,000 names.

In 2009, Rabbi Gutow oversaw the formation of The Israel Action Network, a project in partnership with The Jewish Federations of North America to organize Jewish communities to combat efforts to delegitimize or isolate Israel.

Also in 2009, Gutow announced the expansion of the Coalition on the Environment and Jewish Life (COEJL) — a project of JCPA — and the launch of the Jewish Energy Covenant Campaign, under COEJL's aegis. This campaign sought to increase the involvement of the American Jewish community in the nation’s climate change and energy debates.

During his JCPA tenure, the non-profit also became a central agency in combating hunger in America. Rabbi Gutow and JCPA launched the There Shall Be No Needy Among You initiative in 2007 to urge local, state, and national leaders to advance legislation and programs to help provide food, shelter, additional work and educational opportunities for the nation's most vulnerable. Under Rabbi Gutow's leadership, JCPA's poverty campaign implemented several efforts that contributed to an increased national commitment to reduce poverty, such as the "Food Stamp Challenge," Fighting Poverty with Faith, and the "Childhood Nutrition Seders," and National Hunger Seders. Rabbi Gutow made the Food Stamp Challenge an annual event to raise awareness about the importance of protecting SNAP, the federal nutrition assistance program (formerly known as food stamps). In 2011, he was joined by 14 Members of Congress and in 2012, he organized over 150 rabbis from all denominations to take the Challenge, living on a weekly food budget of only $31.50.

In 2010, Rabbi Gutow and JCPA launched a major civility campaign entitled “Year of Civility” which aimed to bring back civility to conversations through different texts, source materials, and sermons exploring the Jewish history of dialogue and debate, especially from Jewish scholars Hillel and Shammai. Gutow stressed the idea of dialogue and debate in a functioning democracy as well as maintaining human dignity.

In 2013, the JCPA under Rabbi Gutow undertook an "Immigration Nation" campaign to demonstrate Jewish community support for comprehensive immigration reform and also a campaign to end gun violence, inspired by the massacre at Sandy Hook Elementary School. He organized a letter-writing campaign from 23 national Jewish organizations urging the U.S. Senate to pass gun control legislation that would limit access to high capacity ammunition magazines, waiting periods, and background checks, tracking firearms, as well as provide mental health care and services and examining the role of violence in the media. In his present position as a visiting scholar of the Robert F. Wagner School of Public Service at NYU, which began in 2017, Rabbi Gutow has organized multi-faith organizations in four communities - San Antonio, Indianapolis, Minneapolis-St. Paul, and Miami - Dade.

== Positions of Lay Leadership ==
Rabbi Gutow served in many positions of lay leadership both in the Jewish and general communities. Gutow was a former chair of the Dallas Jewish Community Relations Council. He served on the state board of the Texas Civil Liberties Union, the national board of the American Jewish Congress and created the Coalition for a Progressive Austin as a student at the University of Texas at Auston, as well as maintaining leadership roles in many other local and state organizations in Texas.

In 2010, Gutow joined the board of the Washington, D.C. based Faith in Public Life, an organization founded following the 2004 presidential election to help shape public debates and advance faith as a positive and unifying force for justice, compassion and the common good.

He also served as chair from 2008 to 2009 and later as an executive committee member of the Save Darfur Coalition, a U.S.-based advocacy group calling for international intervention in Sudan, to try and stop the genocidal conflict there.

In March 2012, Rabbi Gutow was arrested with actor George Clooney, NAACP President Ben Jealous, Representatives Jim McGovern (MA) and Jim Moran (VA), comedian and human rights activist Dick Gregory, and others at a protest outside the Sudanese Embassy in Washington, DC, calling on the U.S. to ensure delivery of humanitarian aid to the Blue Nile and Nuba Mountain regions.

Gutow has also served as chair of the board of the National Religious Partnership for the Environment, which is a partnership of the United States Conference of Catholic Bishops, the National Association of Evangelicals, the National Council of Churches, and JCPA.

== Faith-Based and Neighborhood Partnerships ==
In 2015, Rabbi Gutow was appointed to the President’s Council on Faith-Based and Neighborhood Partnerships, and was accepted as a New York member of the Council on Foreign Relations.

In appointing Rabbi Gutow to the President's Advisory Council on Faith-Based and Neighborhood Partnerships, President Obama brought together leaders and experts in fields related to the work of faith-based and neighborhood organizations in order to make recommendations to his administration on how to improve the partnerships it formed to serve people in need. The council was charged with identifying best practices and successful modes of delivering social services, evaluating the need for improvements in the implementation and coordination of public policies relating to faith-based and neighborhood organizations, and making recommendations to the president and the administration on changes in policies, programs, and practices.

After conducting its research, reviews, and deliberation, the council submitted written reports of its recommendations. The charge for the council focused on steps the government should take to reduce poverty and inequality and create opportunity for all, including changes in policies, programs, and practices that affected the delivery of services by faith-based and community organizations and the needs of low-income and other underserved persons.

In 2020, Rabbi Gutow appeared in conversation with Rabbi Dr. Rachel Sabath Beit-Halachmi and the late Dan Cedarbaum on whether “Jewish Life [Is] Meaningless Without Jewish Law.”

== Recognition ==
In 2001, Gutow was awarded both the Reconstructionist Student Association Prize for Social Action within the Reconstructionist Rabbinical College, and the Rabbi Devora Bartnoff Memorial Prize for Spiritually Motivated Social Action.

Gutow has been repeatedly recognized as one of the nation’s most influential rabbis by Newsweek/Daily Beast, in 2009, 2010, and 2012. He has also been recognized as one of the nation’s most notable Jewish leaders by the Forward in 2007.

Rabbi Gutow gave greetings from the Jewish Community at the National Cathedral in Washington D.C. at the November 1, 2015 ceremony to transfer the leadership of the Episcopal Church in the United States from Presiding Bishop Katherine Jefferts-Schori to Presiding Bishop Michael Curry.

In May 2016, Gutow gave the commencement address at Gratz College, where he was awarded an honorary doctorate of communal affairs.
