= Yonatan Shalev =

Israeli activist

- יונתן שלו
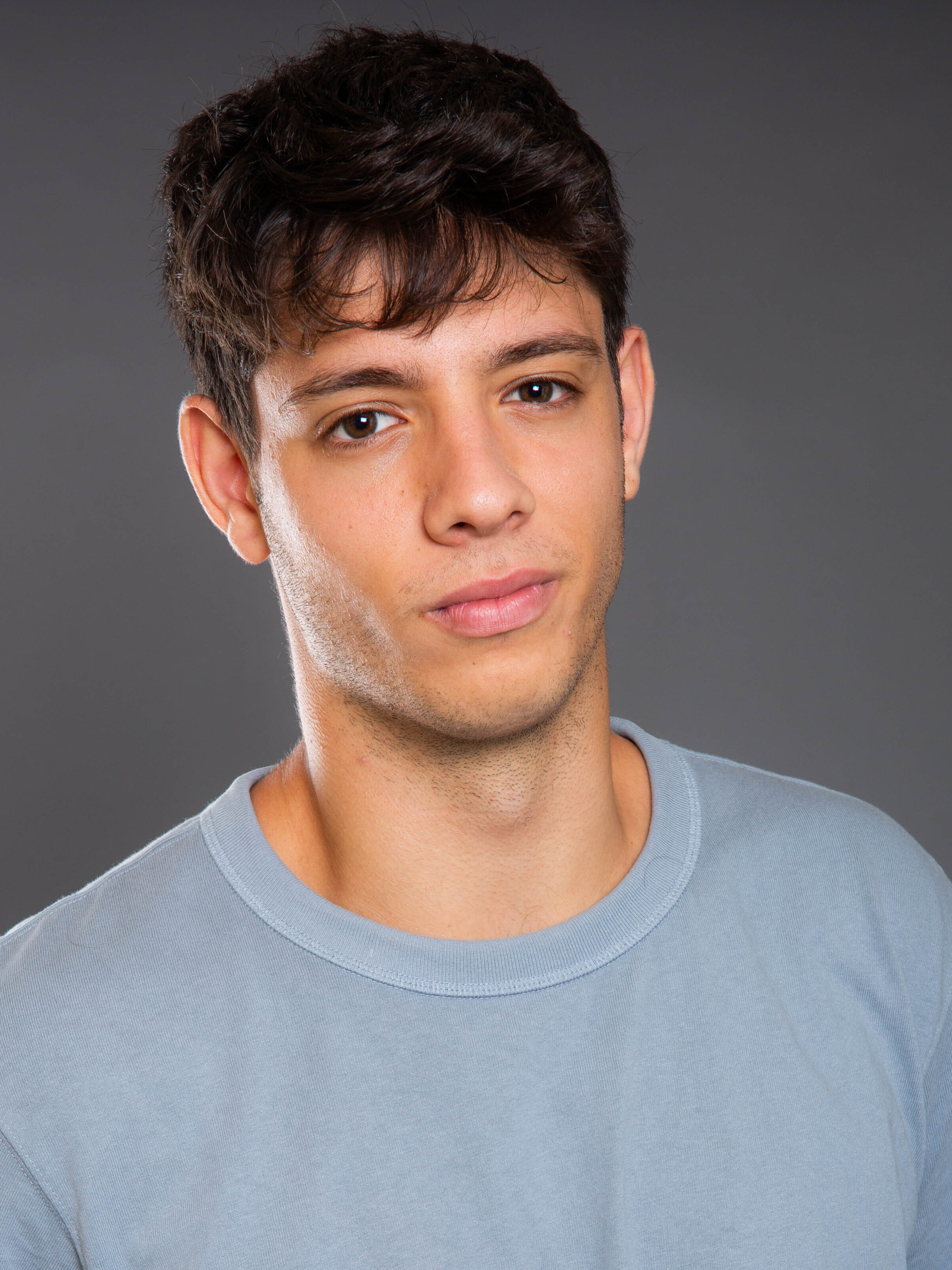
- Shalev in 2024

Faction represented in the Knesset
- 2026–: Together

Personal details
- Born: Jonathan Shalev; October 12, 2002 (age 24) Baltimore, United States
- Citizenship: Israel (since 2002); United States (2002–2026)
- Party: Bennett 2026
- Parent: Michal Tsur (mother)
- Relatives: Gabriela Shalev (paternal grandmother); Naomi Tsur (maternal grandmother)
- Education: Rabin Pre-Military Academy
- Occupation: Social activist

Yonatan Shalev (Hebrew: יונתן שלו; born Jonathan Shalev; 12 October 2002) is an Israeli politician and activist, and member of Knesset. He is also the founder of "Shoulder to Shoulder", an organization representing reservists who advocate for an end to exemptions from military service. In April 2026, Shalev announced his entry to politics and joined the Bennett 2026 party. He became the youngest member of the twenty-sixth Knesset following the election and is also the youngest-ever MK.

== Early life ==
Yonatan Shalev was born on 12 October 2002 in Baltimore, Maryland. At the age of 7, Yonatan moved with his family to New York City where he lived with his grandmother for a time. Five years later, Shalev's family returned to Israel and settled in Zikhron Ya'akov.

Shalev's parents are professor Eran Shalev and enterprenuer Michal Tsur. His paternal grandmother, Gabriela Shalev, is an Israeli academic and diplomat who served as Israeli Ambassador to the United Nations between 2008 and 2010. His paternal grandfather, Sgan Aluf Shaul Shalev, was a battalion commander who died in the Yom Kippur War. His maternal grandmother, Naomi Tsur, served as deputy mayor of Jerusalem between 2008 and 2013, and his maternal grandfather, Haim Tsur, was a radio producer and violinist.

After completing high school, Shalev studied at the Rabin Pre-Military Academy and served in Maglan in 2021. In 2024, he became a reservist and participated in operations in the Gaza war and the Hezbollah–Israel conflict.

== Career ==
=== Social activism ===
In 2023, Shalev, together with Ido Keren, founded the "Shoulder to Shoulder" movement, which works to promote equality in burden for military and civilian service. The movement is led by Hananiah Ben Shimon, former chairman of the Jewish Home youth and the Sovereignty Youth. The organization supports the enforcement of existing laws on conscription, and combines protest activity with the organization of public events. Shalev operates his activism in the Knesset and public arena, including participating in Knesset committee discussions, meeting with elected officials, and sharing the movement's platform in mass media. In November 2024, he appealed to Chief of the General Staff Herzi Halevi and called for the expansion of mandatory conscription and the reduction of economic incentives for populations that do not serve.

In January 2025, during a discussion in the Foreign Affairs and Defense Committee on Haredi conscription, Shalev was removed from the hall after he erupted at the comments of committee members. Following the incident, Defense Minister Israel Katz originally announced that he would meet with Shalev, but the meeting was later canceled. Shalev also coordinated a series of protest actions, including a march from the Kastel to Jerusalem with the participation of about 1,000 people, and a protest in Bnei Brak calling for the enactment of a conscription law.

In July 2025, he participated in a press conference of service organizations against conscription exemptions. In the same year, he participated in the Security and Service Conference of the Yedioth Ahronoth and INSS. He also spoke at a rally at the Hostages and Missing Families Forum.

In March 2026, it was announced that businessman Assaf Rappaport, who headed a group of investors that acquired control of Channel 13, offered Shalev a contract to join the channel as a host and commentator.

=== Political career ===
In April 2026, Shalev announced that he has joined Bennett 2026 and would be competing in the 2026 legislative election. He states that he will focus on changing national priorities, with an emphasis on strengthening the status of the younger generation and securing the future of the country through promotion of a framework of meaningful service and equality of burden for all sectors of Israeli society.

Shalev was elected to the Knesset as a member of the Together alliance. He is expected to be the youngest-ever MK, surpassing the record set by Moshe Nissim in 1959.

== Political positions ==
=== Military conscription ===
In a 2025 op-ed published in Israel Hayom, Shalev addressed the chairman of the Foreign Affairs and Defense Committee, Boaz Bismuth, and claimed that Likud has changed from a party of the state to one that promotes personal politics.

On another occasion, Shalev criticized political and media elements, including Channel 14, claiming that the channel encourages participation in incitement to evasion and does not condemn harm to state security.

=== Gaza war ===
During the Gaza war, Shalev criticized the political leadership for the conduct of the war. Shalev pointed to the lack of strategy leading to repeated incursions and placing reserves in unnecessary risk and attrition.

=== Israeli–Palestinian conflict ===
In an interview on Channel 12, Shalev publicly opposed the establishment of a Palestinian state. In private recordings at a conference of activists from Together, Shalev stated his belief that the Palestinian Authority is too weak to be a security partner in Area A, and that he presented a vision where there is a body caring for the Palestinian population in the West Bank that Israel can reach security agreements with.
