= GZA (disambiguation) =

GZA (born 1966) is an American hip hop artist and member of the Wu-Tang Clan.

GZA may also refer to:

- Greater Zurich Area
- Green Zionist Alliance
- Yasser Arafat International Airport, Palestine
- Guangzhou Academy, the academy team of Guangzhou Charge, Overwatch League
