= Kaltura =

New York-based software company founded between 2006-2007

Kaltura, Inc.
- Type: Public
- Traded as: Nasdaq: KLTR
- Industry: Video SaaS
- Founded: 2006; 20 years ago
- Founder: Ron Yekutiel; Michal Tsur; Shay David; Eran Etam
- Headquarters: New York City, New York, US
- Area served: Worldwide
- Key people: Ron Yekutiel (co-founder, chairman, CEO)
- Products: Virtual event, Online video platform, Educational technology, CloudTV, Enterprise software
- Revenue: ▲US$181 million (2025)
- Net income: ▲ −US$12.1 million (2025)
- Number of employees: 569 (July 2024)
- Website: kaltura.com

Kaltura, Inc. is a software company legally headquartered in New York, with its primary research and development, operational hub, and engineering core located in Ramat Gan, Israel. It was founded in 2006. It operates in several major markets: webinars and virtual events, enterprise video content management and online video platform (OVP), educational technology (virtual classroom), and Cloud TV software; and offers products such as a video portal, an LMS and CMS (course management system) extension, a virtual event and webinar platform, and a TV streaming app.

== History ==
Kaltura was founded in Israel in the fall of 2006 and was launched at the TechCrunch40 industry event in San Francisco on September 18, 2007. At that time, the company had 20 employees, and had received $2.1 million in funding from business angels and Californian VC fund Avalon Ventures.

In 2007, Kaltura began a partnership with the New York Public Library, whose team was headed by Joshua Greenberg, to enhance online rich media in the library's digital collection.

In January 2008, the Wikimedia Foundation and Kaltura announced that they had begun a collaboration aimed at bringing rich-media to Wikipedia and other wiki websites. The technology behind this project is a form of video-wiki software (of open source purport) that was integrated into the MediaWiki platform as an extension, allowing users to add collaborative video players that enable all users to add and edit images, sounds, diagrams, animations and movies in the same manner as they do today with text.

Kaltura was a sponsor of the Wikimania 2008 event, where it announced that it is sponsoring Michael Dale, a video developer, to support the further development of a 100% open source video editing solution integrated into MediaWiki. Kaltura is also a founder of the Open Video Alliance, a group of organizations, academics, artists and entrepreneurs, geared towards promoting open standards for video on the web.

Apart from serving educational institutes like Harvard, Yale, NYU, and others, Kaltura also helps media companies and telcos like Vodafone, Watch Brasil, and Bouygues Telecom, as well as enterprises like Oracle, SAP, Intel, Bank of America, and AT&T.

=== From 2010-present ===
In July 2011, Blackboard Inc. and Kaltura announced a partnership to integrate Kaltura's media solution in Blackboard Learn (TM) in a bid to offer rich media tools to educational institutions.

In May 2014, Kaltura purchased pay TV service Tvinci to widen its scope of video solutions to include over-the-top (OTT) TV capabilities. In August 2016, Kaltura announced that it had raised $50 million from Goldman Sachs. Also in 2016, Kaltura partnered with Inception, 24i Media, Encompass and Harmonic to showcase OTT experiences. In 2019, Kaltura crossed $100 million in annual recurring revenues (ARR).

Kaltura' solutions and APIs all rest on their proprietary online video platform, offering advanced video management, publishing, and monetization capabilities as well as tools for internal knowledge sharing, learning, training, collaboration, and marketing. Kaltura built use-case-centric applications for business, media, and education to facilitate the integration of video into specific workflows, from an open, API-focused architecture. The company reportedly had a community of 160,000 registered developers (2018).

In April 2019, Kaltura announced its intention to develop Cloud TV with Dativa through a dedicated data lake.

In early 2020 Kaltura announced its acquisition of Newrow, a platform for collaborative online meetings. The integration of Newrow's real-time communication capabilities into Kaltura's video asset management and live broadcast/webcast technology paved the way for a single comprehensive solution to power customers' multiple video needs.

In July 2021, Kaltura launched a $150 million IPO, listing on the Nasdaq under the symbol KLTR. In the 12 months leading up to the IPO, Kaltura booked $132 million in revenue.

In May 2022, Kaltura officially launched Kaltura Events, a virtual events platform with modules for event creation and management, as well as event performance measurement (analytics), and event management automation features.

In 2023, Kaltura started integrating generative AI capabilities into its digital experience solutions to enrich content, search and discovery, interactivity, and analytics.

In 2024, they announced the release of Class Genie, an AI-powered agent that creates hyper-personalized learning experiences for students, based on their individual preferences, engagement patterns, and past interactions, and drawing exclusively from their institution's trusted knowledge base. At the annual content and technology convention IBC 2024 Kaltura introduced their new Generative AI capabilities for streaming services, enabling the production of high-quality content at lower costs.

Kaltura currently has offices in Israel, Singapore, the United Kingdom, and the United States.
