= Michal Tsur =

Israeli entrepreneur

- מיכל צור
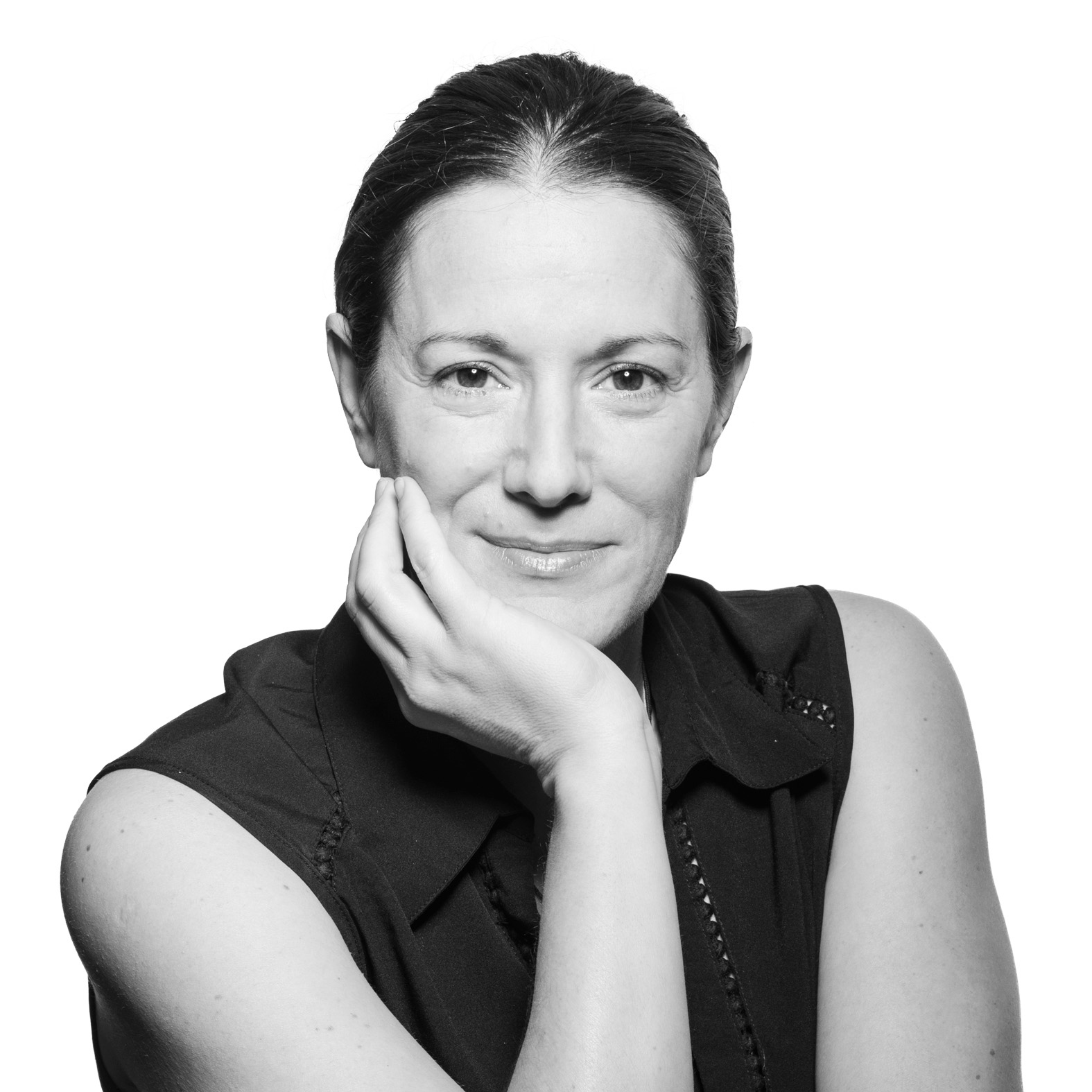
- Born: 1973 (age 52–53); Jerusalem, Israel
- Education: New York University (PhD)
- Occupation: Entrepreneur
- Known for: Co-founder of Cyota; co-founder and president of Kaltura; co-founder and co-CEO of Remepy
- Title: Co-CEO of Remepy
- Spouse: Eran Shalev
- Children: 3, including Yonatan

Michal Tsur (Hebrew: מיכל צור; born 1973) is an Israeli serial entrepreneur who lived in New York. She is the co-founder and co-CEO of Remepy, and was co-founder and president of Kaltura, Nasdaq: KLTR, and co-founder and vice-president of Cyota, acquired by RSA Security Nasdaq: RSAS.

== Biography ==
=== Early life and education ===
Tsur was born in Jerusalem. She completed a doctoral degree in Law, focusing on game theoretic economic analysis of law from New York University. She was then a post-doctoral fellow at Yale Law School's Information Society Project. She is the mother of Israeli pollitician Yonatan Shalev, who is a member of the 26th Knesset.

=== Career ===
Tsur launched her career in the law sector as a clerk at the Supreme Court of Israel. She was driven by research, working at Hebrew University in Jerusalem and the Israeli Democracy Institute.

In 1999, Tsur co-founded Cyota, a cybersecurity company, together with Ben Enosh, Lior Golan and Naftali Bennett. Cyota was acquired by RSA Security in 2005 .

After Cyota was acquired, Tsur and a few friends co-founded Kaltura, an open source video platform, in 2006. Kaltura was listed on Nasdaq:KLTR in 2021.

in 2022, Tsur together with 2 friends, co-founded Remepy, to bring to market Hybrid Drugs, that combine tranditional drugs with therapeutic software.

in 2024 it was announced that former Prime-minister of Israel Naftali Bennett, who was Tsur's partner at Cyota will be joining her on Remepy's board of directors.

Later on that year Tsur was quoted that the best Parkinson'd Disease medication will be developed in Israel and it will be hybrid.

Tsur has authored and contributed to many articles regarding women in tech.
