= Martin Yaffe =

American philosopher (born 1942)

- Born: 1942 (age 83–84)

Academic background
- Education: Claremont Graduate University (PhD), University of Toronto (BA)

Academic work
- Discipline: Philosophy
- Institutions: University of North Texas (1968-)
- Main interests: Jewish thought, political philosophy

Martin D. Yaffe (born 1942) is a Canadian American philosopher and Professor of Philosophy at the University of North Texas. He is known for his works on the Jewish thought and political philosophy.

== Books ==
- Shylock and the Jewish Question. Johns Hopkins University Press: 1997. ISBN 0801856485
- Leo Strauss, Leo Strauss on Moses Mendelssohn. Translated, edited, and with an interpretive essay by Martin D. Yaffe. Chicago: University of Chicago Press, 2012. ISBN 9780226922782, 0226922782
- Thomas Aquinas, Literal Exposition on the Book of Job (tr.), Scholars Press/Oxford University Press, 1989. ISBN 1555402925, 9781555402921
- Benedict Spinoza, Theologico-Political Treatise (tr.), Focus Philosophical Library/Hackett, 2004. ISBN 9781585101122, 9781585100859

=== Edited ===
- Judaism and environmental ethics: a reader, Lanham, Md.: Lexington Books, 2001. ISBN 0-7391-0117-X
- Emil Fackenheim—Philosopher, Theologian, Jew: A Collection of Critical Essays, edited by Sharon Portnoff, Jim Diamond, and Martin Yaffe, Brill 2008. ISBN 9789047429340, 9789004157675
- The Companionship of Books: Essays in Honor of Laurence Berns, Lexington Books, 2011. ISBN 9780739150467
- Reorientation: Leo Strauss in the 1930s. Edited by Martin D. Yaffe and Richard Ruderman. New York NY: Palgrave MacMillan, 2014. ISBN 1137374233, 9781137374233
- Civil Religion in Modern Political Philosophy: Machiavelli to Tocqueville, Pennsylvania State University Press, 2020. ISBN 9780271086156, 9780271086163
- Emil Fackenheim’s Post-Holocaust Thought and its Philosophical Sources, University of Toronto Press, 2021. ISBN 1487529643, 9781487529642
- Laurence Berns’s The Political Philosophy of Francis Bacon, with Special Attention to the Principles of Foreign Policy, Political Animal Press, 2024. ISBN 1895131693, 9781895131697
