= Eco-Kashrut =

Political movement

Eco-Kashrut, also called the Eco-Kosher movement, is a movement to extend the Kashrut system, or Jewish dietary laws, to address modern environmental, social, and ethical issues, and promote sustainability.

This movement began in the 1970s among American Reconstructionist Jews, and eco-kashrut or eco-kosher approaches enjoyed a resurgence in the 1990s with the work of Reconstructionist rabbi, author, and activist Arthur Waskow. A third wave of the eco-kashrut or eco-kosher movement began in the mid-2000s, spurred on in part by a series of kosher production facility scandals.

== History ==
Rabbi Zalman Schachter-Shalomi, a founder of the Jewish Renewal Movement, is credited with coining and developing eco-kashrut in the late 1970s. He articulated eco-kashrut as an evolving set of practices that extend beyond traditional kashrut by taking the human and environmental costs of food production and consumption into account when deciding what to eat or not eat.

== Contemporary movement ==
More recently the movement has been championed by other Kosher-keeping Jews who strive to eat only food that has been ethically and sustainably produced, and ideally, locally sourced. Eco-Kashrut also finds expression in the sharing of sustainable shabbat meals.

Eco-Kashrut is connected with Magen Tzedek ("Shield of Justice"), an additional certification for food advocated by the Rabbinical Assembly and others within the Conservative movement that aims to address health, safety, and other labor issues in food production. Amid opposition from the Orthodox movement, no products have been certified to carry the seal as of August 2017.

== See also ==
- Judaism and environmentalism
- Jewish vegetarianism
- Ecotheology
- Hazon
