= Joshua Greenberg =

American academic

Joshua M Greenberg
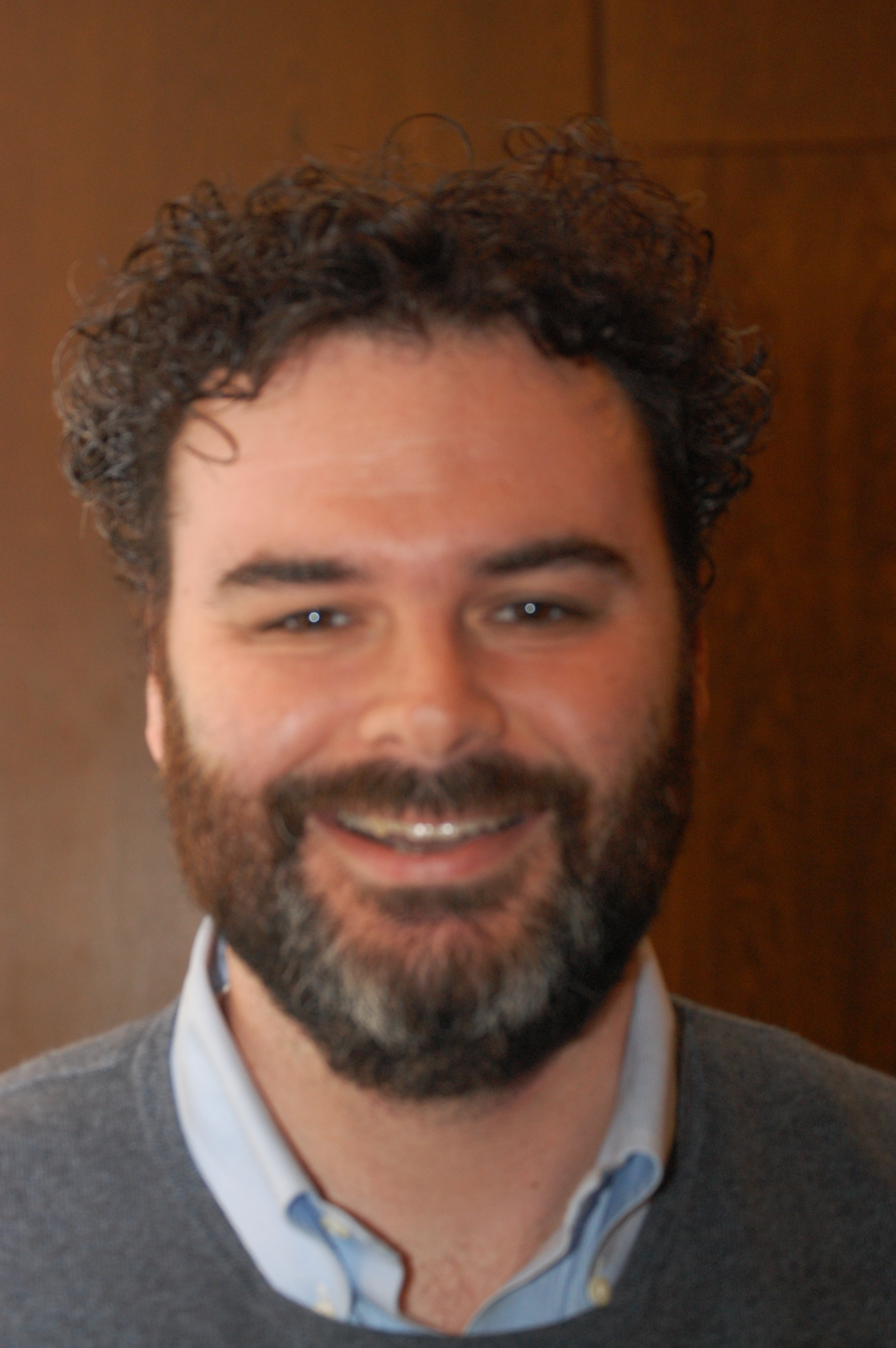
- Greenberg in May 2014
- Born: 1976 (age 49–50); Atlanta, Georgia, United States
- Education: Johns Hopkins University; Cornell University
- Greenberg's voice recorded May 2014

Joshua "Josh" M. Greenberg (born 1976) is an American academic working in sociology of scientific knowledge. Greenberg is Program Director for Digital Information Technology at the Alfred P. Sloan Foundation. Previously he was the Director of Digital Strategy and Scholarship at the New York Public Library (NYPL). His interests encompass the intersection of scholarship, education and information technology. His initiatives at NYPL engaged the nascent disciplines of digital asset management.

== Education ==
Greenberg earned a B.A. degree at Johns Hopkins University in 1998. He was awarded an M.A. degree at Cornell University in 2002.

Greenberg's doctorate from Cornell in 2004 was conferred on the basis of a thesis, From Betamax to Blockbuster: Mediation in the Consumption Junction (OCLC 58539393). In this work, Greenberg argued that the evolution was less a physical transformation than a change in perception, but one that relied on the very tangible construction of a network of social institutions. This work was the basis for his 2008 book, From Betamax to Blockbuster: Video Stores and the Invention of Movies on Video, which explores how the VCR was transformed from a machine that records television into a medium for movies.

== George Mason University ==
Greenberg was a research instructor of History and Art History at George Mason University. He was simultaneously the Associate Director of Research Projects at the Center for History and New Media (CHNM). He participated in the development of Zotero and Omeka.

While at CHNM, he was affiliated with H-Net as Web Editor for H-Sci-Med-Tech.

== New York Public Library ==
Greenberg served NYPL in a newly created position as the Director of Digital Strategy and Scholarship, which means that he was actively involved in determining what the job would become. Greenberg headed the Digital Experience Group. By the end of 2009, the Digital Experience Group was folded into NYPL's Strategy office, effectively ending DEG at NYPL. DEG's blog was not updated between July 19, 2009, and January 1, 2010.

According to David Ferriero, then Andrew Mellon Director of the Library, Greenberg was hired to "not only shape the digital library but think about where our users are and ways of getting NYPL in their faces." Among the more easily noticed innovations was the merging of NYPL's catalog systems. Formerly, there were two distinct catalogs, one for the research libraries (CATNYP) and another for the branch libraries (LEO). Now there is one, unified, online NYPL catalog.

The group's purview included the catalog and more. Controversy surrounded the integration of research and circulating collection catalogs. Greenberg evidenced the rationale behind a single catalog:

"It's not like there are two sets of people using them; the people using them are New Yorkers. So we're bringing it all together, which will make for a more efficient and more coherent process."

Greenberg and his NYPL team of digital designers and programmers worked to maintain NYPL's "Digital Gallery" to increase access to NYPL's extensive holdings of images, maps, etc. In addition, other projects to expand the NYPL offerings are evolving.

=== Kaltura partnering project ===
In 2007, NYPL established an innovative working relationship with Kaltura, an open-source platform for media which can then be embedded and played elsewhere on the Internet. Greenberg explained:

"Kaltura is a good fit for The New York Public Library as we work to take advantage of the latest technologies and approaches to make our collection freely and widely accessible .... Working with Kaltura was a natural step in enabling the creative use of these rich materials in the broader online world."

Greenberg's development plans included expanding the Spanish-language version of the NYPL web site, as well as potentially offering new languages in the future. In order to encourage more people to use the libraries, the collections are being made more accessible online.

The team headed by Greenberg is refining digital-scholarship components for a major Library exhibitions, including the one on Yaddo. The terminal set up in the exhibit never actually functioned, and a link to a gmail address was provided to viewers. The online Yaddo exhibit was ultimately made available without press release on the NYPL website.

=== Flickr partnering project ===
Greenberg's strategy led to NYPL investment in the development of Flickr Commons, including the challenges and costs of building and maintaining a "virtual reading room" and lessons learned the hard way.

== Select works ==
- Greenberg, Joshua (2008). From Betamax to Blockbuster: Video Stores and the Invention of Movies on Video. Cambridge: MIT Press. ISBN 978-0-262-07290-8.
- "Between Expert and Lay," IEEE Annals of the History of Computing (April–June 2005). Vol. 27, No. 2, pp. 95–96.
- "Creating the 'Pillars': Multiple Meanings of a Hubble Image," Public Understanding of Science (2004) Vol. 13, No. 1, pp. 83–95.

== See also ==
- Center for History and New Media
- Coalition for Networked Information
- National Digital Information Infrastructure and Preservation Program of the Library of Congress (NDIIPP)

== Notes ==
=== References ===
- Hagel, John and John Seely Brown. (2005). The Only Sustainable Edge: Why Business Strategy Depends on Productive Friction and Dynamic Specialization. Boston: Harvard Business Press. ISBN 978-1-59139-720-5; OCLC 57641452
- Johnson, Marilyn (2010-02-01). This Book Is Overdue!: How Librarians and Cybrarians Can Save Us All (1 ed.). Harper. ISBN 978-0-06-143160-9., especially pages 188–192, 240–241
- McGee, Micki. (2008). Yaddo: Making American Culture. New York: New York Public Library/Columbia University Press. ISBN 978-0-231-14736-1 ISBN 978-0-231-14737-8; OCLC 226360217
