= 1948 in Israel =

«««
← 1948
1948 in Israel
»»»
1949
1950
1951
Decades:
See also:
1940s • 1950s • 1960s • 1970s
Other events of 1948
List of years in Israel

Events in the year 1948 in Israel.

== Incumbents ==
- Prime Minister of Israel – David Ben-Gurion (Mapai), from May 14
- President (or Chairman) of the Provisional State Council of Israel – Chaim Weizmann, from May 17
- President of the Supreme Court – Moshe Smoira

== Events ==
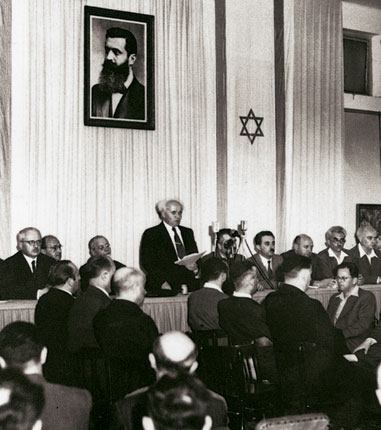
David Ben-Gurion publicly pronouncing the Israeli Declaration of Independence, May 14, 1948

The State of Israel was declared after the end of the civil war, which was raging for six months in Palestine after the vote by the United Nation to partition Palestine between Palestinian Jews and Arabs.

Declaration of independence and international recognition:

- May 14 – The Israeli Declaration of Independence is made in Tel Aviv, a few hours before the British Mandate is due to expire. At midnight the British Mandate of Palestine is officially terminated and the State of Israel comes into being.
- May 15 – The United States grants de facto recognition to the State of Israel, eleven minutes after it comes into existence, becoming the first country to recognize the Jewish state.
- May 17 – The Soviet Union grants de jure recognition to the State of Israel, becoming the first country to do so.
- May 17 – Chaim Weizmann becomes President (or Chairman) of the Provisional State Council and Israel's de facto head of state.
- May 18 – Poland and Czechoslovakia grant recognition to the State of Israel.
- May 19 – Guatemala and Uruguay grant recognition to the State of Israel.
- May 24 – South Africa grants recognition to the State of Israel.

1948 Arab–Israeli War:

- May 15 – Four of the seven countries of the Arab League at that time, namely Egypt, Iraq, Jordan and Syria, backed by Arab volunteers invade the territory of the former British Mandate of Palestine and clash with Jewish forces. The resulting 1948 Arab–Israeli War lasts for 13 months.
- May 14–18 – 1947–1948 Civil War in Mandatory Palestine: Operation Kilshon – Capture by Jewish forces of buildings abandoned by British troops to strengthen the Jewish military position in Jerusalem.
- May 18 – An Egyptian air raid on the Tel Aviv Central Bus Station kills 42 people and injures 100.
- May 20 – The Syrian Army is blocked at kibbutz Degania Alef in the north, where local Jewish militia reinforced by elements of the Carmeli Brigade halted Syrian armored forces.
- May 20 – Operation Balak begins with the objective of transferring arms from Czechoslovakia to Israel.
- May 26 – The Provisional government of Israel decides on the establishment of the Israel Defense Forces and David Ben-Gurion signs the order for its establishment.
- May 29 – The Egyptian Army is blocked in the Ad Halom bridge.
- June 1 – The Irgun and the Provisional government of Israel sign an agreement for the dissolution of the Irgun and integration of its fighters into the Israel Defense Forces.
- June 2 – The Israel Defense Forces's Operation Pleshet starts.
- June 7 – Kibbutz Nitzanim surrenders to the Egyptian Army in the Battle of Nitzanim.
- June 10 – The Syrian Army destroys the Jewish settlement Mishmar HaYarden in the Upper Galilee.
- June 11 – The Irgun's cargo ship Altalena which carries weapons, medical equipment and 930 Jewish immigrants, sets sail from France towards Israel.
- June 20 – Altalena reaches the coast of Israel. The Provisional government of Israel demands that all the weapons on board be handed over to it unconditionally, in accordance with the agreement regarding the integration of the Irgun into the Israel Defense Forces. The Irgun refuses to comply.
- June 22 – A violent confrontation between the Israel Defense Forces and members of the Irgun occurs over the Altalena and David Ben-Gurion eventually orders the Israel Defense Forces to shell the Altalena, and it burns off the shore of Tel Aviv. Sixteen Irgun fighters and three Israel Defense Forces soldiers die in the fighting.
- July 9 – The beginning of the Israel Defense Forces's Operation Dekel, which lasts until the July 18.
- July 10 – Operation Danny: Israel Defense Forces Soldiers capture the strategically important airport at Lydda. (Territory later annexed by Israel)
- September 17 – The Lehi assassinates the Swedish diplomat Folke Bernadotte, who was appointed by the UN to mediate between the Arab nations and Israel.
- September 22 – The Provisional State Council of Israel passes the Area of Jurisdiction and Powers Ordnance, 5708-1948, annexing all territory that Israel had captured since the war began, and declaring that from then on, any part of Palestine captured and secured by the Israel Defense Forces would automatically be annexed to Israel.
- September 24–27 – 1948 Arab–Israeli War: Transport of Supermarine Spitfires acquired by Israel through Czechoslovakia.
- October 15 – The beginning of the Israel Defense Forces's Operation Yoav, aimed at conquering the whole Negev desert.
- October 21 – Battle of Beersheba: The Israel Defense Forces's Negev Brigade occupies Beersheba.
- October 29 – The beginning of the Israel Defense Forces's Operation Hiram, aimed at conquering the Upper Galilee.
- November 11 – Population Census is held in Israel, six months after its creation, to establish the population registry.
- December 27 – The Israel Defense Forces starts Operation Horev, a wide scale attack against the Egyptian army in the Western Negev.
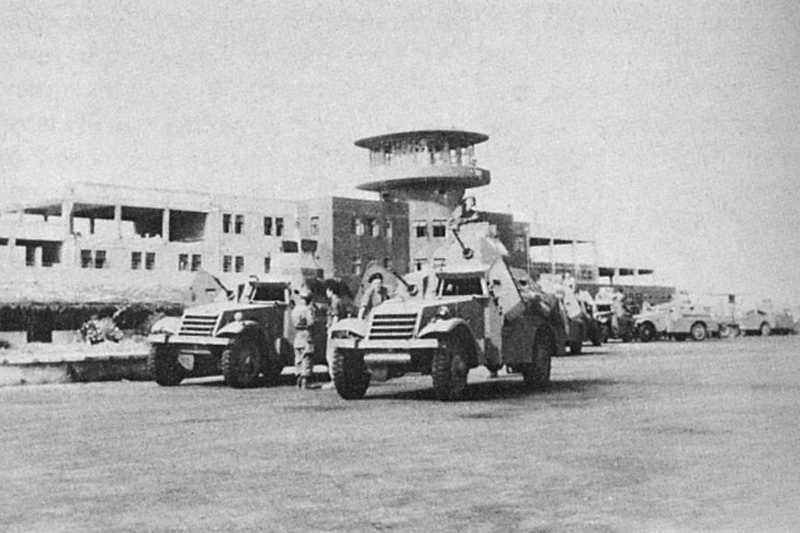
The strategically important airport at Lydda following its capture by the Israel Defense Forces in July 1948

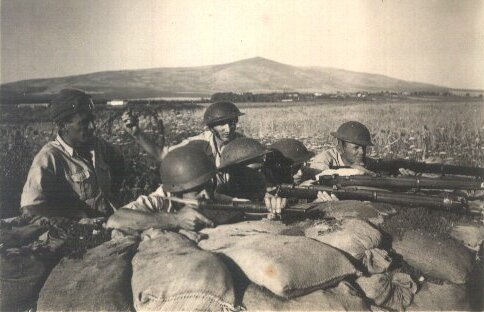
Haganah soldiers near Afula during the 1948 Arab–Israeli War

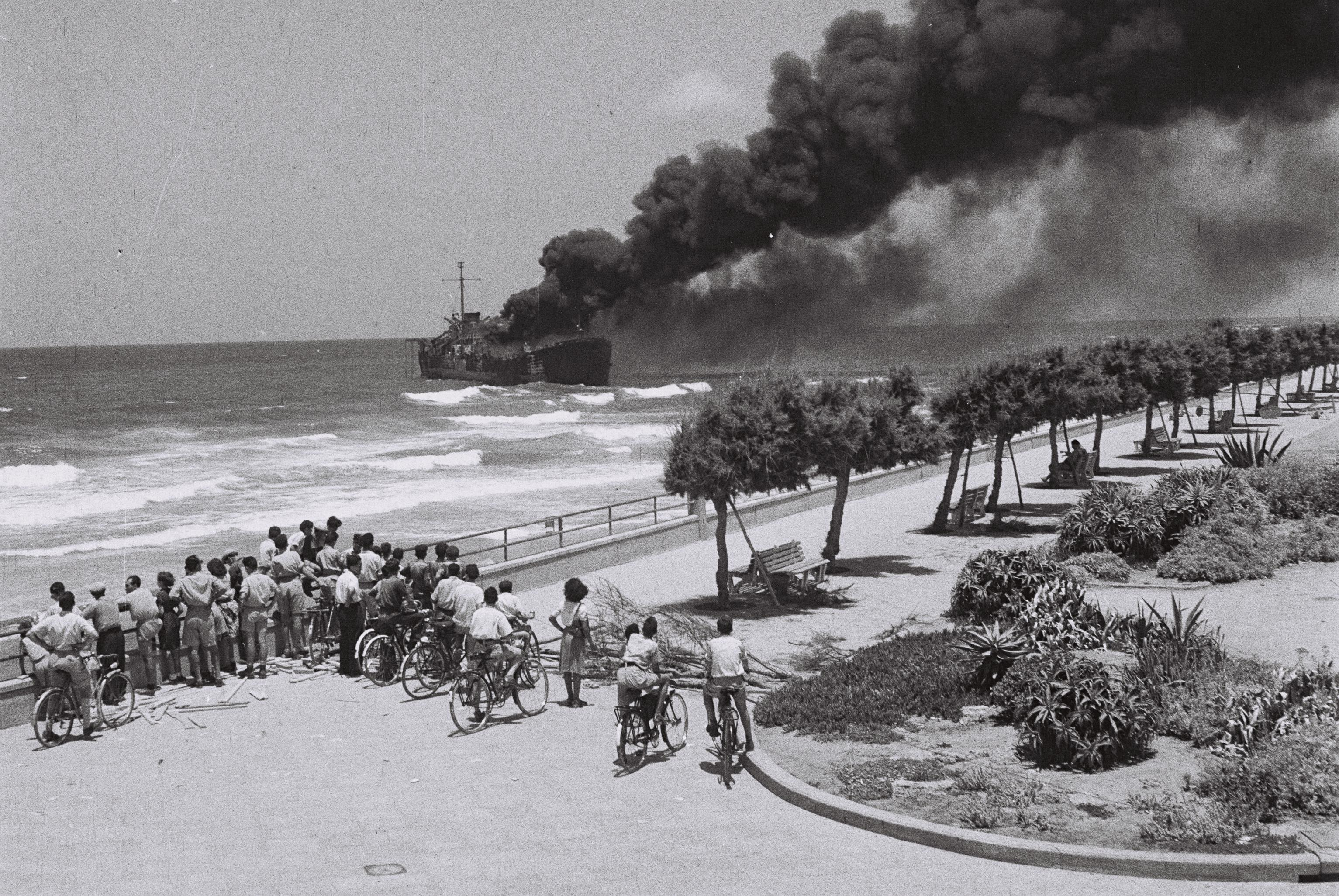
Altalena on fire after being shelled near Tel Aviv

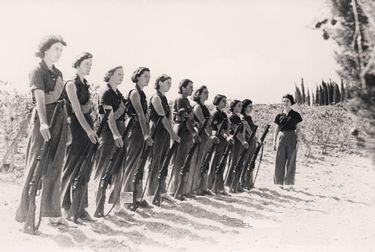
Israeli Jewish female soldiers training at Mishmar HaEmek during the 1948 Arab–Israeli War, 1948

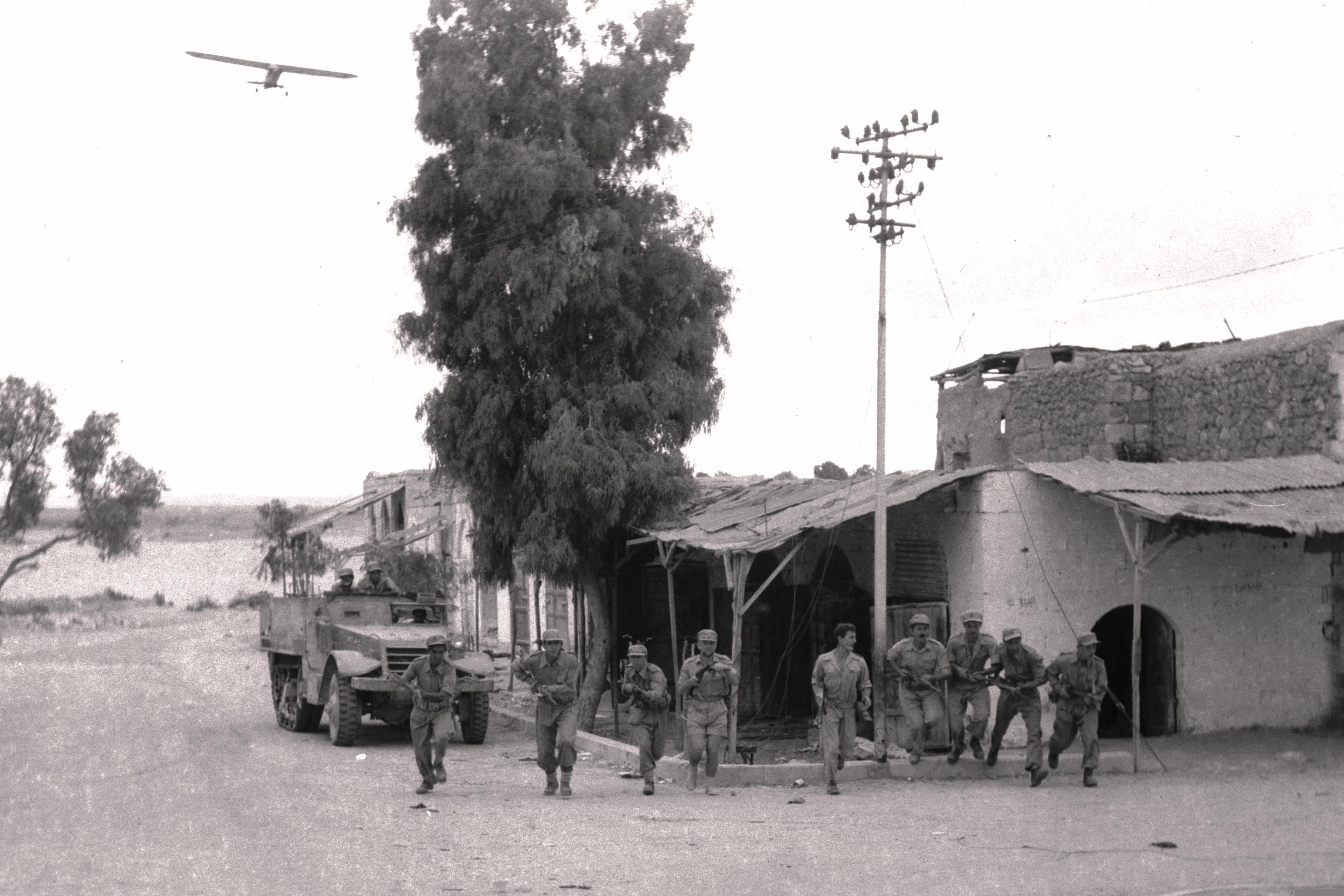
Israeli forces capture Beersheba during the Battle of Beersheba, October 21, 1948

Other events:

- July 22 – The Supreme Court of Israel is formed, with the first five judges of the court appointed after being recommended by the Minister of Justice and the interim government and appointed in a vote by the Provisional State Council.
- August 17 – The Israeli pound replaces the Palestine pound and becomes the official currency of Israel when the Provisional State Council passes a law recognizing the new lira banknotes printed by the Anglo-Palestine Bank, which began arriving in Israel in July 1948, as legal tender.
- September 14 – The Supreme Court of Israel is officially inaugurated in a ceremony in Jerusalem.
- October 28 – The Israeli flag becomes the official flag of the State of Israel.
- November 8 – The first population census in Israel is held, and the government began issuing identity cards to residents.
- November 15 – Israel's fledgling national airline is incorporated as El Al.

== Notable births ==
- May 15 – Dror Zeigerman, Israeli politician and diplomat.
- May 15 – Yaakov Amidror, Israeli general and National Security Adviser.
- June 1 – Eti Livni, Israeli politician.
- June 2 – Roni Bar-On, Israeli politician and lawyer.
- June 12 – Yossi Beilin, Israeli politician.
- July 7 – Avigdor Feldman, Israeli lawyer.
- July 16 – Pinchas Zukerman, Israeli violinist.
- July 29 – Meir Shalev, Israeli author.
- August 1 – Avi Arad, Israeli-American businessman.
- August 19 – Avihu Medina, Israeli composer and singer-songwriter.
- August 24 – Dov Lupi, Israeli-American gymnast.
- September 7 – Dan Halutz, the 18th Chief of Staff of the Israel Defense Forces.
- September 8 – Naomi Tsur, Israeli politician and environmentalist.
- September 26 – Ehud Yatom, Israeli politician and Shin Bet agent.
- October 10 – Micha Goldman, Israeli politician.
- October 12 – Eli Danker, Israeli actor.
- December 8 – Benny Morris, Israeli historian and professor.

== Notable deaths ==
- May 23 – Thomas C. Wasson (born 1896), US diplomat, assassinated in Jerusalem.
- May 29 - Esther Cailingold (born 1925), British-born Israeli soldier commemorated as a war hero, killed in action in Jerusalem during the battle for the Old City.
- June 10 - Mickey Marcus (born 1901), American-born Israeli general, Israel's first general, shot dead in a case of friendly fire.
- June 30 – Meir Tobianski (born 1904), Lithuanian-born Israeli officer executed as a traitor, but later exonerated.
- September 17 – Folke Bernadotte (born 1895), Swedish diplomat, assassinated in Jerusalem.
- October 16 – Modi Alon (born 1921), Israeli fighter pilot and commander of Israel's first fighter squadron, plane crash.

== See also ==
- 1948 in Mandatory Palestine
- List of Israeli films of 1948
