= List of Israeli films of 1948 =

A list of films produced by the Israeli film industry in 1948.

== 1948 releases ==
Premiere	Title	Director	Cast	Genre	Notes	Ref
?	Bayit Ha'Arava (Hebrew: בית הערבה, lit. "Willow House")	Joseph Krumgold and Ben Oyserman		Documentary		

== See also ==
- 1948 in Israel
