= 1948 in All-Palestine (Gaza) =

- 1948 in the All-Palestine (Gaza)
«««
← 1948
»»»
1949
1950
1951
See also:
1948 in the United Kingdom
Other events of 1948

1948 in All-Palestine (Gaza) refers to the events, within the jurisdiction of the All-Palestine Government in Gaza Strip under Egyptian protection.

== Incumbents ==
- Prime Minister: Ahmed Hilmi Pasha

== Events ==
=== September ===
- On 22 September 1948, the All-Palestine Government was proclaimed by the Arab League and immediately recognized by all its members with the exception of Transjordanian Emirate (later the Kingdom of Jordan).

=== October ===
- 15 October – The beginning of the IDF's Operation Yoav, aimed at conquering the whole Negev desert.
- 21 October – Battle of Beersheba: The IDF's Negev Brigade occupies Beersheba.

=== December ===
- 27 December – The IDF starts Operation Horev, a wide scale attack against the Egyptian army in the Western Negev.
- Late December - the All-Palestine Government relocates to Cairo, following the Israeli offensive on Western Negev and Gaza.
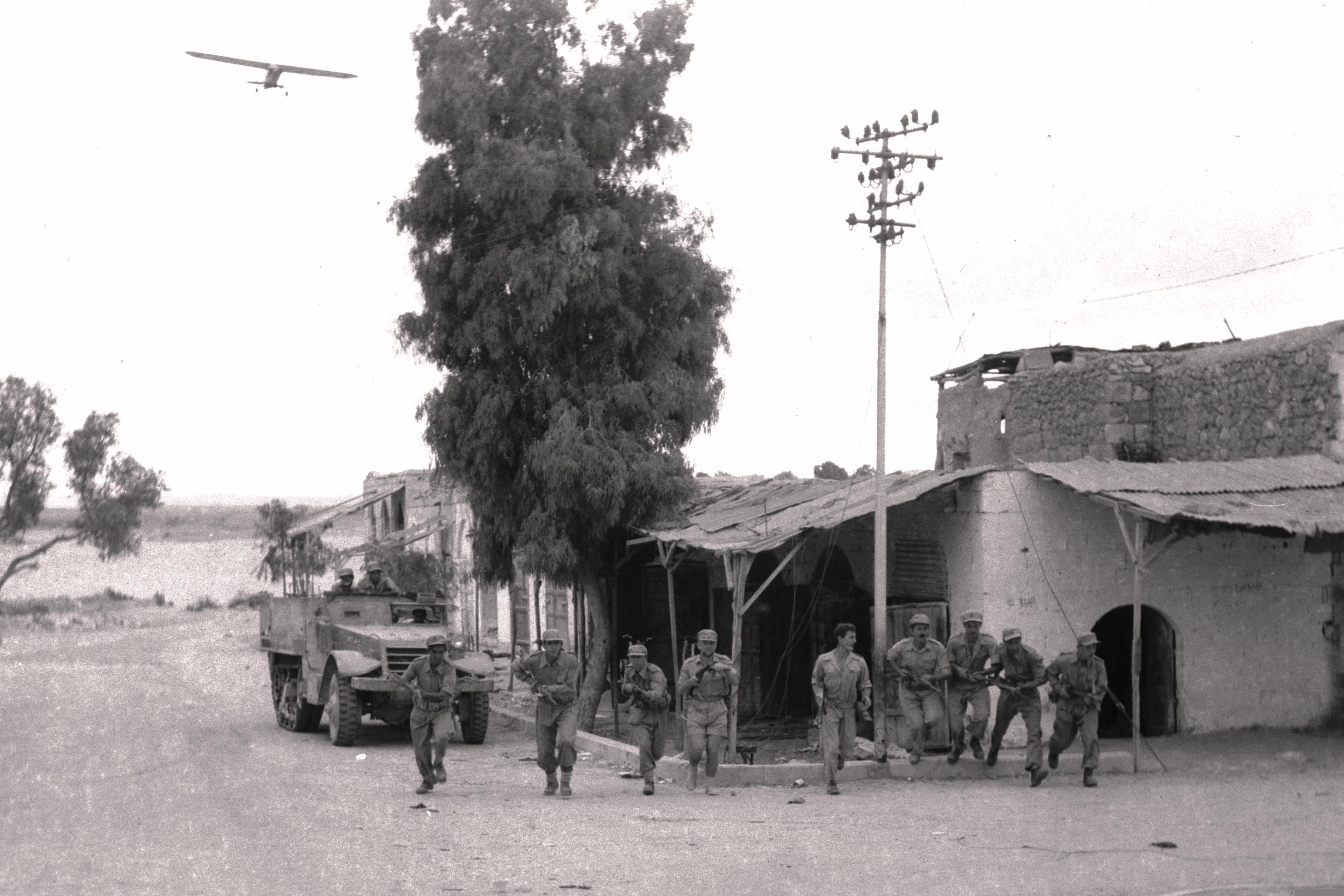
Israeli forces capture Beersheba during the Battle of Beersheba, 21 October 1948

== See also ==
- 1948 in Mandatory Palestine
- 1948 in Israel
- Nakba
- 1947-1949 Palestine War
