= Jewish Council for Public Affairs =

American nonprofit organization

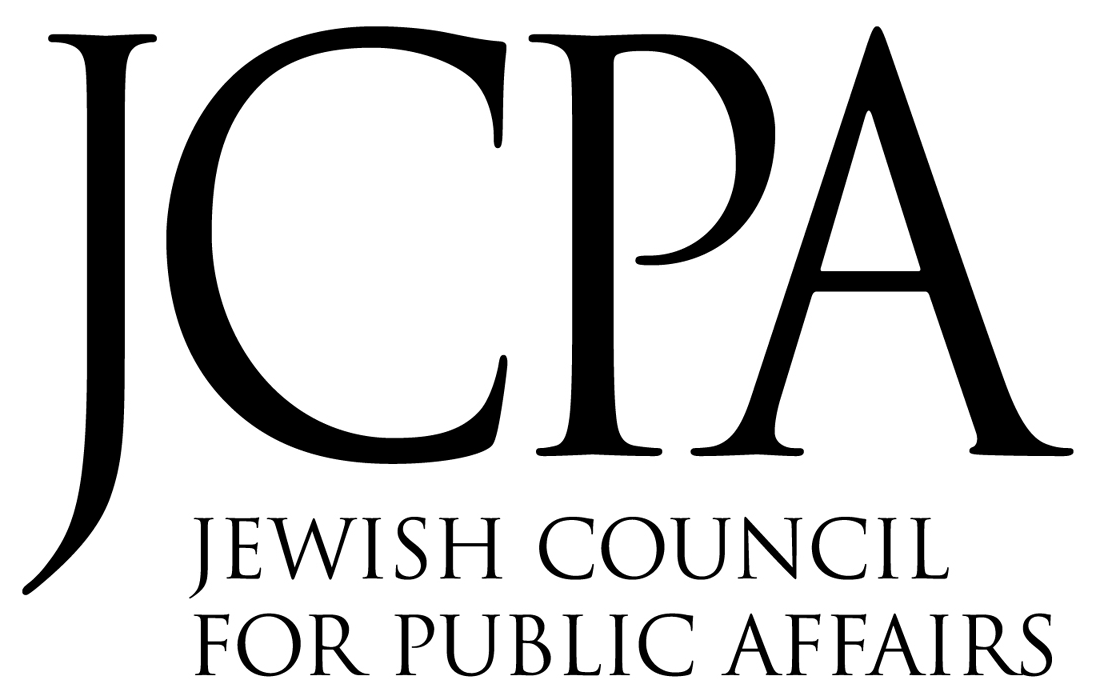
- Abbreviation: JCPA
- Formation: 1944; 82 years ago
- Tax ID no.: 13-1624104
- Legal status: 501(c)(3) organization
- Headquarters: New York City, New York, US
- President and CEO: Amy Spitalnick
- Chair: Michael Fromm
- Revenue: $2.6 million (2018)
- Expenses: $2.5 million (2018)
- Website: jewishpublicaffairs.org
- Formerly called: National Community Relations Advisory Council; National Jewish Community Relations Advisory Council

The Jewish Council for Public Affairs (JCPA) is an American Jewish progressive and advocacy group.

JCPA was originally founded in 1944 by the Council of Jewish Federations as the umbrella organization for local Jewish advocacy arms known as community relations councils. For almost 80 years it represented approximately 125 local Jewish federations and community relations councils and was the coordinating body for 15 national Jewish organizations.

In 2022, JCPA split from the Jewish Federations of North America and became independent, ending its communal representative role, as the organization maintained its advocacy for progressive positions.

== History ==
The JCPA was founded as the National Community Relations Advisory Council in 1944 by the Council of Jewish Federations to represent local Jewish advocacy arms known as community relations councils. In the 1960s, it was renamed the National Jewish Community Relations Advisory Council (NJCRAC). The group adopted the JCPA name in 1997. Arnold Aronson was program director from 1945 to 1976. David L. Bernstein served as president and chief executive officer from J6 through 2022.

The National Community Relations Advisory Council opposed the Rosenberg Committee, believing them to be a Communist group. The council issued a statement that the Rosenberg Committee's accusation that the Rosenberg trial was motivated by antisemitism was causing public panic within the Jewish community.

The council, along with the American Jewish Congress, the Anti-Defamation League, the American Jewish Committee, and other Jewish groups and community leaders asked Nelson Mandela to clarify his pro-Palestinian views during his 1990 visit to New York City. During a meeting in Geneva with Jewish-American communal leaders that included the JPCA, Mandela apologized for offending the Jewish-American establishment, expressed appreciation for South African Jews who opposed apartheid, praised certain Israeli leaders, and agreed that the State of Israel had a right to exist. Following Mandela's death, Rabbi Steve Gutow, President of the JCPA praised him as "came to embody courage in the face of severe injustice."

In 2021, the DC chapter of the Sunrise Movement called for the removal of the JCPA, the National Council of Jewish Women, and the Religious Action Center of Reform Judaism from a voting rights coalition due to their Israeli ties and support for Zionism. Sunrise DC apologized after Jewish organizations condemned the chapter for antisemitism.

As national Jewish advocacy organizations such as the Jewish Federations of North America and the American Jewish Committee focused more of their political work on supporting Israel, the JCPA's influence within the Jewish establishment waned. After JCPA signed an open letter in the New York Times in support of the Black Lives Matter movement, conservative donors within the federation system boiled over.

=== Break with Jewish federations ===
In December 2022, the JCPA announced that it would end its role speaking on behalf of 125 Jewish community relations councils, almost all part of local Jewish federations, and 16 national Jewish organizations. As a result, JCPA broke with the Jewish Federations of North America and would lose funding from the dues-paying local federations.

JCPA hoped that changes would enable it to be part of progressive coalitions and strengthen Jewish support for progressive policies. As part of the transition, activist Amy Spitalnick, who led a successful lawsuit against the organizers of the Unite the Right rally, was hired as CEO in May 2023.

== Activities ==
International issues that the JCPA is concerned with include Israel–United States relations, global antisemitism, the United Nations, the well-being of Jews in endangered areas, genocide, and human rights. Domestic issues that the JCPA is concerned with include anti-Semitism, social justice, poverty, education, public health, the environment, immigration, individual rights, and religious liberties including the preservation of the separation of church and state.

It has been active in supporting rights of Israeli Arabs and has fought for equality in Israel.

== Policy ==
The JCPA supports a two-state solution to the Israeli–Palestinian conflict, stating on their website that their organization supports "Israel as the Jewish homeland and works to deter efforts to undermine the Jewish people’s right to self-determination." The JCPA's Israel Action Center was created in 2010 to combat BDS movement activities in the United States, accusing the movement of "bias against Israel". David Bohm, the board's chair, has said the JCPA has an unclear position on working with progressive anti-Zionist groups, saying that many anti-Zionist sentiments are antisemitic, but the organization might be willing to participate in coalitions with anti-Zionist groups.

== Initiatives ==
Shocked by the atrocities in Darfur, the JCPA helped found the Save Darfur Coalition in 2004. It continues to organize the Jewish community in support of continued US action to bring peace to Sudan, supporting the creation of South Sudan and working with the White House and Congress to ensure humanitarian assistance.

In September 2007, the JCPA launched an anti-poverty program "There shall be no needy among you." The effort seeks to raise awareness and action to combat hunger, homelessness and other vestiges of poverty in America. The JCPA has led multiple Food Stamp Challenges, organizing Members of Congress, clergy, and others to live for one week on the average food stamp allotment of $31.50. Starting in 2008, the JCPA and MAZON: A Jewish Response to Hunger have sponsored an annual Hunger Seder Mobilization, tying the Passover message of freedom to the ongoing struggles with hunger in America. The mobilization begins each year with a National Hunger Seder in the US Capitol where Members of Congress and national faith and anti-hunger advocates read from a specially prepared haggadah. Hunger Seders have been held in over 30 states across the country.

Along with Catholic Charities USA and the National Council of Churches, the JCPA has been a cosponsor of the annual Fighting Poverty with Faith mobilization since 2008. Fighting Poverty with Faith mobilizes community's to hold events aimed at making ending poverty a national priority with a different theme each year. Past themes have included "Good Jobs, Green Jobs," poverty, hunger, and affordable housing.

The JCPA is also actively involved in environmentalism and climate change issues though its program the Coalition on the Environment and Jewish Life (COEJL), an affiliate of the National Religious Partnership on the Environment.

In partnership with the Jewish Federations of North America, the JCPA created the Israel Action Network in 2010 to help communities counter the delegitimization of Israel. The IAN was created to educate, organize and mobilize the organized North American Jewish community to develop strategic approaches to attacks on Israel and use partnerships to promote peace and security for two states for two peoples.

Other national campaigns of the JCPA have included the Vote On Guns campaign to end gun violence following the 2012 Sandy Hook Elementary School shooting and the 2013 "Immigration Nation" campaign in support of comprehensive immigration reform.

== See also ==
- Hannah Rosenthal
