= Laurence Berns =

American philosopher

- Born: 1928
- Died: 2011 (aged 82–83)

Education
- Education: University of Chicago (PhD)

Philosophical work
- Era: 21st-century philosophy
- Region: Western philosophy
- Main interests: political philosophy

Laurence Berns (1928–2011) was an American philosopher and Richard Hammond Elliot Tutor Emeritus at St. John’s College, Annapolis. He is known for his works on political philosophy. A festschrift in his honor titled The Companionship of Books was published in 2011.
