= Philip Wexler =

Professor at Hebrew University of Jerusalem

Philip Wexler (1943–2023) was a professor emeritus at the Hebrew University of Jerusalem. He was first appointed in 2002 as Professor of Sociology of Education and then Unterberg Chair in Jewish Social and Educational History. After retirement he was visiting professor in the Faculty of Human and Social Sciences at the University of Wuppertal, Germany.

== Biography ==
Wexler received a bachelor's degree from New York University and master's and doctoral degrees in sociology from Princeton University.

Wexler was William Scandling Professor of Sociology and Education at the University of Rochester. He then moved to Jerusalem where he did field research on newly religious youth, and studied Jewish mystical texts in Hebrew and Yiddish. While on leave from the Hebrew University, he served as Bronfman Professor at Brandeis University. He died on March 25, 2023.

== Academic work ==
Wexler is the author of a number of books in the fields of sociology of religion and sociology of education. He was Editor of the American Sociological Association journal, Sociology of Education. During 2008–2009, together with Jonathan Garb, he convened a year- long working group at the Institute of Advanced Studies in Jerusalem, on “Sociology and Anthropology of Jewish Mysticism in Comparative Perspective.” The working group meetings and conferences produced a book, “After Spirituality: Studies in Comparative Mysticism,”

== Books ==
- The sociology of education : beyond equality Indianapolis : Bobbs-Merrill Co., 1976.
- Critical social psychology Boston : Routledge & Kegan Paul, 1983. Held in 567 libraries according to WorldCat
- Social analysis of education : after the new sociology London; New York : Routledge & Kegan Paul, 1987
- Critical theory now London; New York : Falmer Press, 1991
- Becoming somebody : toward a social psychology of school London; Washington, D.C. : Falmer Press, 1992
- After postmodernism : education, politics, and identity (with R A Smith) London; Washington, D.C. : Falmer Press, 1995
- Holy sparks : social theory, education, and religion New York : St. Martin's Press, 1996. ISBN 9780312126926
- The mystical society : an emerging social vision Boulder, Colo. : Westview Press, 2000
- Mystical Interactions: Sociology, Jewish Mysticism and Education Los Angeles : Cherub Press, 2007
- Symbolic Movement: Critique and Spirituality in Sociology of Education Rotterdam, The Netherlands : Sense Publishers, 2008
- Social Theory in Education Primer New York : Peter Lang, 2009
- Mystical Sociology: Toward a Cosmic Sociology New York : Peter Lang, 2013
- Social Vision: The Lubavitcher Rebbe's Transformative Paradigm for the World Herder & Herder, 2019.
