= Green Zionism =

Branch of Zionism

Green Zionism is a branch of Zionism that focuses on the environment of Israel. It fuses Israeli-specific environmental concerns with support for the existence of Israel as a Jewish state.

According to the eco-Zionist ideology of A.D. Gordon, the protection and conservation of nature in Eretz Israel is an important tool for Jewish national revival.

The term is now used by Aytzim, the first environmental organization to participate in the World Zionist Congress, the World Zionist Organization, and its constituent agencies.

== See also ==
- Ale Yarok
- Wildlife in Israel
