= Esther Cailingold =

British schoolteacher and volunteer Haganah soldier

- אסתר ציילינגולד
- Born: Esther Cailingold; 28 June 1925; Whitechapel, London, England
- Died: 29 May 1948 (aged 22); Jerusalem
- Cause of death: Killed in action
- Resting place: Mount Herzl, Jerusalem
- Occupations: Schoolteacher and volunteer Haganah soldier

Esther Cailingold (Hebrew: אסתר ציילינגולד; 28 June 1925 – 29 May 1948) was a British-born schoolteacher of Polish extraction, who fought with the Jewish forces during the 1948 Arab-Israeli War and died of wounds received in the battle for the Old City of Jerusalem. She is commemorated, in Israel, by the Esther Cailingold memorial forest at Kibbutz Lavi in the Lower Galilee, by a scholarship fund at Yeshivat HaKotel in Jerusalem, and on various war memorials including that of the Israeli Armored Corps at Latrun. Several libraries and other rooms in children's homes in Israel are named after her. In England she is remembered through the Esther Cailingold society in North London, part of Emunah UK, a worldwide Jewish children's welfare charity.

== Biographical details ==
=== Birth, family and education ===
Esther Cailingold was born on Milward Road in Whitechapel, London, on 28 June 1925, as the eldest child of Moshe Cailingold and Anne, née Fenechel. Moshe had immigrated from Warsaw in 1920, and had opened up a London branch of his family's bookselling and publishing business. After the family moved to Stamford Hill, (Heathlands Rd.), North London, in 1936, Esther attended the North London Collegiate School for girls, eventually winning a scholarship to Goldsmiths College, University of London (temporarily based in Nottingham), to study English. She graduated with first-class honours in 1946.

=== Zionism ===
Esther's Zionism derived principally from her strict Orthodox Jewish background. Her father, one of the founders of Poland's Young Mizrachi movement, ("Mizrachi" here refers to the worldwide religious Zionist movement, the name has also been used by a now-defunct Israeli political party) maintained a fervent Zionism in the family home, such that "Esther was a Zionist...before she knew of any formal movement or heard her first Zionist speech". Her youthful convictions were strengthened by awareness of international events such as the rise of Hitler, the growth of European (and British) anti-semitism and later, during and immediately after the war, the emerging details of the Holocaust. Until then her Zionism had expressed itself mainly in religious and youth-related activities, such as her involvement with Bachad, (Bachad's origins are as a pre war German Jewish youth movement which came to England with refugees) which ran training farms in Britain and Europe to prepare young people for future life on a kibbutz. Thereafter her belief strengthened that her future lay with the Jewish community in Palestine, and in the autumn of 1946 she successfully applied for a post as an English teacher at the Evelina de Rothschild school in Jerusalem.

== In Jerusalem ==
=== Haganah Soldier ===
Esther arrived in Jerusalem on 1 December 1946 to take up her teaching post. In the ensuing months, whilst immersing herself in the local culture, she witnessed the growing street violence, the imposition of curfews and other restrictions on movement, attacks on Jewish property and personnel, and specific events such as the trial, conviction and execution of Irgun activist Dov Gruner, and the drawn out saga of the refugee ships such as the Exodus. As a result, her perspective changed; her letters home reflect a harder attitude and an increasingly sharp anti-British sentiment. By October 1947 she had joined Haganah, and while continuing with her teaching job for the time being, she began attending training camps to prepare for possible combat duty. In January 1948 she left Evelina de Rothschild and became a full-time Haganah soldier. In addition to military duties and continuing training she acted as a continuity announcer for Haganah's English-language broadcasting service, whilst seeking a posting to the garrison defending the Jewish Quarter in the Old City, the most vulnerable of all the Jewish sectors within Jerusalem.

=== The Jewish Quarter ===
In 1948 the Jewish Quarter covered a smaller area than it had once and does now. It then housed around 1700 civilians, mainly women, children and elderly, and was defended by a small garrison of mixed Haganah, Irgun and Lehi troops under a Haganah commander. The Quarter was entirely cut off from the rest of Jewish Jerusalem, surrounded by hostile Arab districts and effectively indefensible in the face of attack. It had no strategic military value but was of great symbolic importance. However, its garrison was severely undermanned and undersupplied, dependent for food and other necessities on a weekly convoy escorted by British troops, through which arms and additional combat troops had to be smuggled.

Esther entered the Old City, ostensibly as a teacher, in the last of such convoys, on 7 May 1948 and reported to the Haganah commander. Her assigned task was a mobile role - supplying the needs (arms, ammunition, food, drink, etc.) of the various outposts throughout the quarter. When she arrived, a tenuous truce was operating and things were relatively quiet, but a full-scale onslaught on the Quarter was anticipated, after the anticipated British troops withdrawal on 14 May. This duly occurred. Sections of the civilian population wanted to negotiate a cease fire. They had to be forcibly restrained. On 16 May, during the first sustained attack on the Quarter, Esther was wounded, though not disabled - she quickly returned to her duties after a field-dressing, often using the exposed rooftops as her means of access between posts. On 19 May a small Palmach unit broke through the Zion Gate and reached the beleaguered garrison. Esther was there to receive them and for a moment it seemed that fortunes might have turned, but the force swiftly withdrew. On that same day, King Abdullah's Arab Legion arrived at the Mount of Olives and began shelling the Jewish Quarter, which was contracting daily as Arab ground troops advanced. It became a house-to-house battle, and Esther's mobile role became impossible, so she joined one of the defending groups as a Sten gunner. On 26 May she was seriously injured when a building she had just entered exploded, shattering her spine. She was carried to the Quarter's hospital, but lack of supplies meant that little medical treatment was available. When the hospital came under shell-fire the next day Esther and the other wounded were moved to a safer area. Here, she remained conscious and able to talk, read her bible and say her prayers. Meanwhile, with the destruction of the Hurva synagogue, resistance in the Jewish Quarter effectively ended, with less than forty defenders still holding out. Surrender followed shortly afterwards.

=== Death ===
After the surrender on 28 May, Esther and the other wounded were moved, this time to the nearby Armenian School, just outside the Jewish Quarter. Early on the following morning Esther, after refusing a cigarette (it was Shabbat), she fell into a coma and did not regain consciousness. She died some time around 5.00 am on 29 May. Her last letter to her parents had been written six days earlier and handed to fellow-soldier Chaveh Leurer, who passed it to Harry Levin after the surrender. Levin in turn gave it to Moshe Cailingold when the latter came to Jerusalem in July.

== Aftermath ==
After the surrender of the Jewish Quarter garrison to the Arab Legion under Abdullah al Tel, the remaining buildings in the quarter were systematically destroyed, including 58 of the 59 synagogues in the Old City. The quarter's Jewish residents were removed to Israeli lines, and lost all their property. The Arab victory in the Old City was one of their few successes in the 1948 Arab-Israeli conflict, which they termed their al-Nakba ("the Catastrophe"). In the Six-Day War of June 1967 Jewish forces captured the entire Old City, and thereafter the Jewish Quarter was rebuilt.

None of the men or women who fought for the Jewish Quarter in 1948 received citations for bravery, although Moshe Rusnak, her commander, singled Esther out as deserving. Along with the 38 other Old City fighters who died, Esther was posthumously enlisted in the Israeli Defence Forces and, after temporary burial in a West Jerusalem quarry, her body was re-interred in Mount Herzl military cemetery in September 1950.

== See also ==
- Siege of Jerusalem (1948)

== Sources ==
- Martin Gilbert: Jerusalem in the 20th Century. Chatto & Windus, 1996.
- Collins & Lapierre: O Jerusalem. History Book Club, 1972.
- Dan Kurtzman: Genesis 1948. Da Capo Press edition, 1992.
- Asher Cailingold: An Unlikely Heroine. Valentine Mitchell, 2000.
- Harry Levin: Jerusalem Embattled. Cassell edition, 1997.
- Yehuda Avner: The Prime Ministers: An Intimate Narrative of Israeli Leadership. Toby Press, 2010.
