= 1948 in Mandatory Palestine =

«««
1947
1946
1945
»»»
1948→
1948→
1948→
See also:
1948 in the United Kingdom
Other events of 1948

Events in the year 1948 in the British Mandate of Palestine.

== Incumbents ==
- High Commissioner – Sir Alan Cunningham

== Events ==
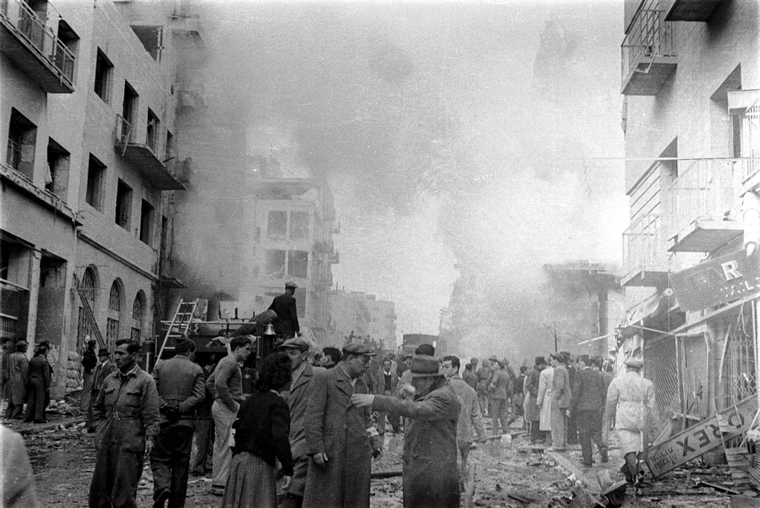
Car bomb explosion on Ben Yehuda Street, Jerusalem, 22 February 1948

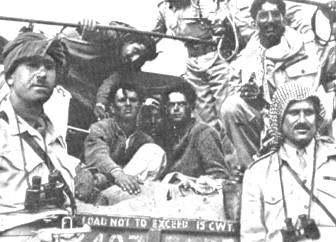
Arab Legion commander Abdullah el Tell (far right) with Captain Hikmat Mihyar (far left) pose for a photo with Yaakov Edelstein and Yitzhak Ben Sira, who were taken prisoner after the fall of Gush Etzion, May 1948

=== 1947–1948 Civil War in Mandatory Palestine ===
- 5 January – The Haganah bombs the Semiramis Hotel in the Katamon neighborhood of Jerusalem, killing 24 or 26 people.
- 2 February – Three people are killed in a bombing in the Palestine Post (now the Jerusalem Post) building.
- 2 February – 1948 Ben Yehuda Street Bombing: Three British Army trucks, led by an armoured car driven by Arab irregulars and British deserters, explode on Ben Yehuda Street, Jerusalem, killing 58 Jewish civilians and injuring 140.
- 15 February – The first issue of the Hebrew language daily tabloid Maariv is published.
- 28 February – The Carmeli Brigade and Golani Brigade are formed.
- 2 March – Haganah forces carry out bombing raids on Jezreel Valley railway, which significantly damaged it.
- 6 March – Fawzi al-Qawuqji, the field commander of the Arab Liberation Army, crosses the Allenby Bridge with his troops, which includes approximately 500 soldiers.
- 11 March – The Jerusalem headquarters of the Jewish Agency is bombed by agents of the Grand Mufti Haj Mohammed Amin al-Husseini; twelve people are killed.
- 17 March 1947 – The Jewish Agency Press Office at 5 Ben Yehuda Street is bombed by John Hanson (Jack) May, a Palestine Police officer, in retribution for the deaths of colleagues and in response to a Palestine Post article by American commentator Ben Hecht, who wrote that he had "a little holiday in (his) heart when he heard of each British death". The bomb caused significant property damage, but as it was planted in the evening, when the offices were empty, there were no deaths or injuries.
- 30 March – Operation Hashmed: Haganah clearance of the Isdud–Yibna road.
- 4–5 April – Haganah clearance of villages around Haifa–Jenin road.
- 5–20 April – Operation Nahshon: Haganah clearance of Arab forces blocking the road to Jerusalem.
- 9 April – The Deir Yassin massacre takes place, in which approximately 120 fighters from the Irgun and Lehi Zionist paramilitary groups attacked Deir Yassin near Jerusalem, an Arab village of roughly 600 people. Over 100 civilians are killed.
- 10 April – The founding of the moshav Bror Hayil.
- 12–16 April – Battle in Ramat Yohanan between Druze and Haganah forces, leading to a Druze–Haganah alliance.
- 13 April – The Hadassah medical convoy massacre: A convoy, escorted by Haganah paramilitary members, bringing medical and fortification supplies and personnel to Hadassah Hospital on Mount Scopus is ambushed by Arab forces. 79 Jews, mainly doctors and nurses, are killed in the attack.
- 15–21 April – Operation Harel: Haganah clearance of Arab forces northeast of the Tel Aviv – Jerusalem road.
- 15 April – Operation Yiftach: Haganah/Palmach capture of Safed and other villages in the eastern Galilee
- 21–22 April – Operation Bi'ur Hametz: Haganah capture of Haifa.
- 22 April–2 May – Operation Yevusi: Haganah capture of buildings in Jerusalem's Jewish neighborhoods.
- 25–27 April – Battle of Manshiyya: Irgun attack on the Manshiyya neighborhood of Jaffa, leading to British intervention.
- 27 April– 13 May – Operation Hametz: Haganah capture villages east of Jaffa.
- 3–4 May – Operation Matateh (part of Operation Yiftach): opening up Tiberias–Metula by Palmach forces.
- 6–12 May – Battle of Safed (part of Operation Yiftach): Capture of Safed by Palmach forces.
- 8 May – Operation Maccabi: Haganah opening up the corridor to Jerusalem.
- 10–15 May – Operation Barak: Capturing areas under responsibility of Givati Brigade.
- 11 May – Operation Gideon: Haganah capture of the Beit She'an and surrounding area.
- 13 May – Kfar Etzion massacre: The Gush Etzion (the Etzion Bloc), three Jewish kibbutzim which were established in 1945–1947 and dominated the road between Jerusalem and Hebron, hold off Arab attacks for ten days until one of the kibbutzim, Kfar Etzion, falls on 13 May, and the Arab forces massacre Kfar Etzion's remaining defenders. Altogether, 127 Jews, including 21 women, are killed in the battles of 12–13 May and the subsequent massacre. Only three men and one woman survive. The following day, the three other kibbutzim surrender and the prisoners are taken as POWs by the Arab Legion and held by Jordan for a year before being released.
- 13–14 May – Operation Ben-Ami: Capture of Acre and the coast up to the Lebanese border.
- 13 May – Operation Schfifon: Capture of buildings abandoned by British troops in the Old City of Jerusalem.
- 14 May – The Declaration of Independence of Israel is made in Tel Aviv, the day before the British Mandate of Palestine is due to expire.
- 15 May – At midnight between 14 and 15 May, the British Mandate is officially terminated and the State of Israel comes into being.
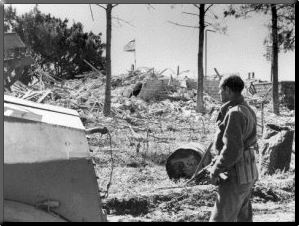
Haganah soldier in Al-Qastal, 5 April 1948.

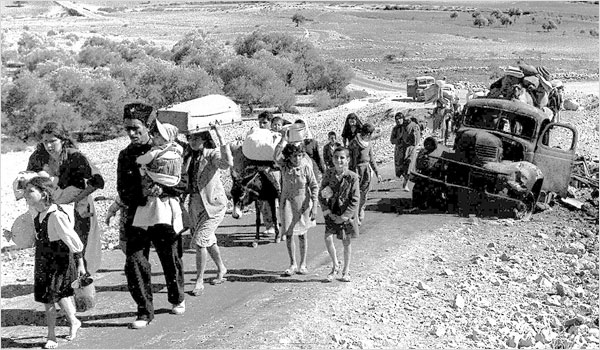
Palestinian Arab refugees, 1948

== Notable births ==
- 15 January; Avishay Braverman, Israeli economist and politician and president of the Ben-Gurion University of the Negev.
- 17 January; David Witzthum, Israeli television presenter, editor, and lecturer.
- 24 March; Shraga Bar, Israeli footballer.
- 4 April; Michael Kleiner, Israeli politician.
- 8 April; Esther Salmovitz, Israeli lawyer and politician.
- 3 May; Amikam Balshan, Israeli chess master.

== Notable deaths ==
- 8 April – Abd al-Qadir al-Husayni, Palestinian Arab military commander, killed in battle.
- 13 April – Chaim Yassky, Jewish physician and medical administrator, killed in the Hadassah medical convoy massacre.

== Bibliography ==
Morris, Benny, (2003). The Road to Jerusalem: Glubb Pasha, Palestine and the Jews. I.B.Tauris. ISBN 978-1-86064-989-9
