= Religious Action Center of Reform Judaism =

Political and legislative outreach arm

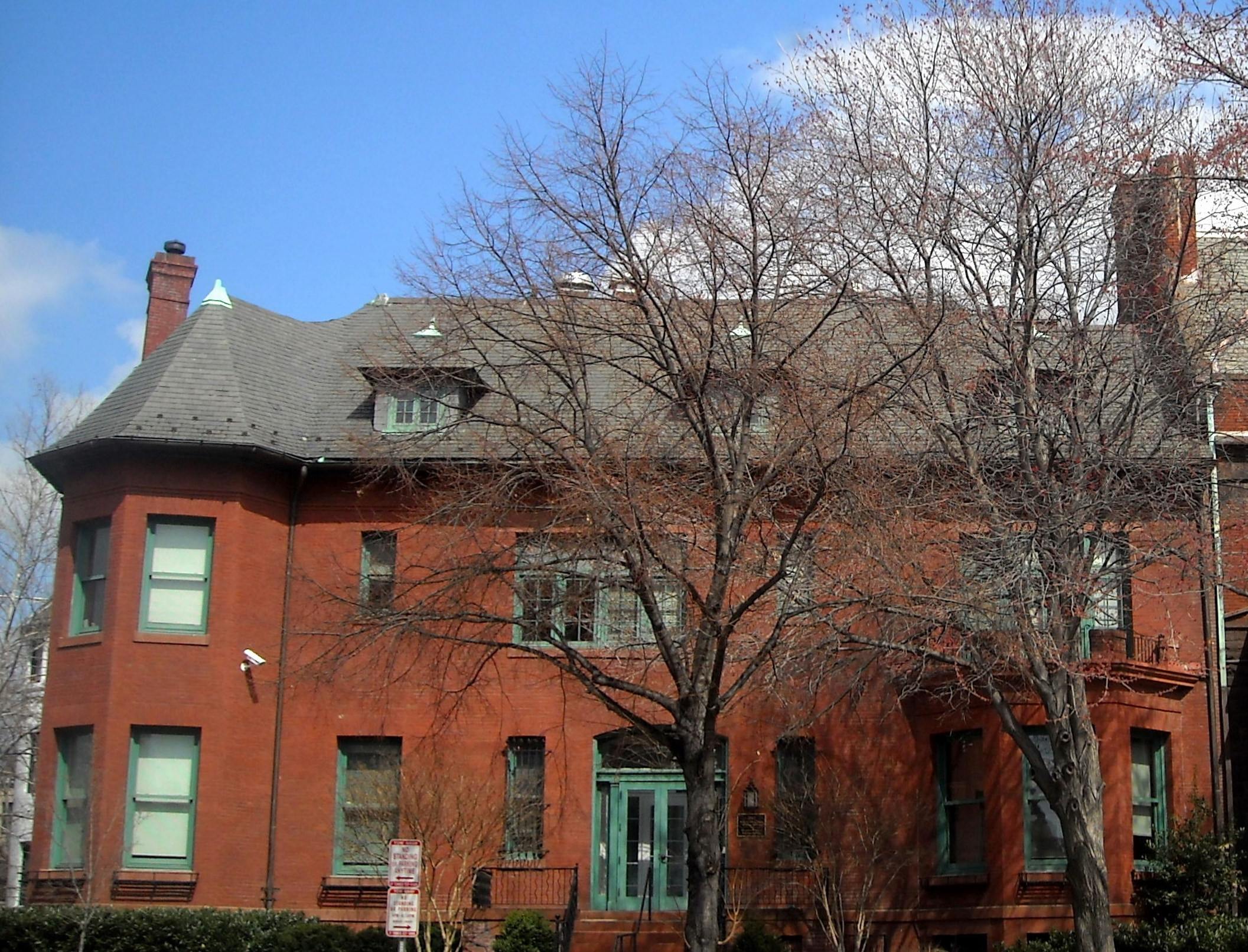
- The organization's headquarters in Washington, D.C.
- Founded: 1961; 65 years ago
- Headquarters: Washington, D.C.
- Director: Rabbi Jonah Dov Pesner
- Website: www.rac.org

The Religious Action Center (RAC) is the political and legislative outreach arm of Reform Judaism in the United States. The Religious Action Center is operated under the auspices of the Commission on Social Action of Reform Judaism, a joint instrumentality of the Central Conference of American Rabbis and the Union for Reform Judaism. It was founded in 1961.

== History ==
Consistent with the political and social concerns of Reform Judaism, the Religious Action Center played a key role in important political events of the American civil rights movement, the struggles of Soviet Jewry, as well as the ongoing humanitarian crisis in Darfur. It hosted several meetings at which the groundwork for the various pieces of legislation, including the Civil Rights Acts and Voting Rights Acts, were laid. It also shielded civil rights marchers who were attacked by District of Columbia police.

Aside from its community organizing and direct advocacy work, the Religious Action Center has also been a hub of social justice programming for the Reform Jewish community. The L'Taken seminar series has given thousands of young Jews the opportunity to visit Washington, D.C., and learn about public policy and Jewish values. The Religious Action Center also hosted a Passover seder for the Dalai Lama in the late 1990s. As part of the weekend, students celebrate Havdalah at the Jefferson Memorial.

Rabbi David Saperstein served at Religious Action Center from 1974 to 2015, as director and chief legal counsel. In that role he was recognized by Newsweek in 2009 as "the most influential rabbi in the country". On July 28, 2014, President Barack Obama nominated Saperstein to be the first non-Christian to hold the post of United States Ambassador-at-Large for International Religious Freedom. In December 2014, Saperstein's appointment to the post won U.S. Senate confirmation.

In January 2015, Saperstein was succeeded at Religious Action Center by Rabbi Jonah Pesner. Pesner grew up in New York, and served as a congregational rabbi in Boston. He created "Just Congregations" in 2006, a program that teaches congregations to join in interfaith advocacy for social justice issues. Pesner will continue to serve as Senior Vice President of the Union for Reform Judaism, a post he has held since 2011. The Washington Post described the director position at Religious Action Center as being "the closest thing to being American Jews' lobbyist on mostly non-Israel issues." Those issues have included health care, prison reform, marriage equality and reproductive freedom, while Pesner expects to increase the organization's focus on racial and economic disparities.

Because Religious Action Center's priorities most closely approximate those of the Democratic Party, Religious Action Center has, at times, struggled in an increasingly polarized Congress. Saperstein's close alignment with the Democratic Party at times earned him suspicion of the Republican Party, while Pesner will represent a Jewish community at a time when Gallup polls show Jewish loyalty to the Democratic Party has dropped from 71% in 2008 to 61% in 2014.

In 2021, the DC chapter of the Sunrise Movement called for the removal of the RAC, the National Council of Jewish Women, and the Jewish Council for Public Affairs from a voting rights coalition due to their Israeli ties and support for Zionism. Sunrise DC apologized after Jewish organizations condemned the chapter for antisemitism.
