= Ellen Bernstein =

American rabbi and ecotheologian (1953–2024)

- Born: Ellen Sue Bernstein; July 22, 1953; Newburyport, Massachusetts, U.S.
- Died: February 27, 2024 (aged 70); Philadelphia, Pennsylvania, U.S.
- Education: University of California, Berkeley (BS); Hebrew College (MA); Academy for Jewish Religion (New York)
- Occupations: Ecotheologian, writer, educator
- Website: www.ellenbernstein.org

Ellen Sue Bernstein (July 22, 1953 – February 27, 2024) was an American rabbi, author, and educator. She has been called the "birthmother of Jewish environmentalism" and a prominent figure in the world of religion and ecology. Bernstein's work focused on how the Bible and Judaism provide a guide for connecting with and healing the Earth.

== Early life and education ==
Bernstein was born in Newburyport, Massachusetts, to Etta (Feigenbaum) Bernstein and Fred Bernstein, and was raised in Haverhill alongside her sister and brother. She became interested in environmental science in high school. She attended the University of California, Berkeley, where she studied at one of the first environmental science programs in the country.

Later in life, she also attended San Francisco State University and earned two master's degrees: one in biology, from Southern Oregon State University, and one in Jewish education, from Hebrew College.

== Adult life and impact ==
Bernstein eschewed terms like "Jewish environmentalism" because she felt they implied Judaism was not inherently ecologically based. She also worked across religious denominations, writing that "religious and spiritual communities can be vitally important in organizing, inspiring, and sustaining individuals in the repair of the world." Bernstein emphasized that science alone would not inspire people to care for the world, but believed that people would save what they love. During the last twenty years of her life she worked on animating the ecological dimensions of the Bible.

In 1988, Bernstein founded Shomrei Adamah, a Jewish environmentalist organization. She was ordained as a rabbi in 2012 by the Academy for Jewish Religion. She worked as advisor for identity and praxis at Hampshire College from 2016 to 2020. In 2023, she spoke at the United Nations General Assembly on the role of women in responding to climate change.

== Writings ==
Bernstein's writings bring together themes in Judaism and ecology. Her two final books were The Promise of the Land: A Passover Haggadah (2020), which guides Seder attendees to feel more connected to the Earth and its well-being, and Toward a Holy Ecology: Reading the Song of Songs in the Age of Climate Crisis (2024), an ecological analysis of the Song of Songs, with a foreword by Bill McKibben.

=== Books ===
- Ellen Bernstein (2000). Ecology & the Jewish Spirit: Where Nature & the Sacred Meet. Jewish Lights Publishing. ISBN 9781580230827.
- Ellen Bernstein (2005). The Splendor of Creation: A Biblical Ecology. Pilgrim Press. ISBN 9780829816648.
- Ellen Bernstein (2020). The Promise of the Land: A Passover Haggadah. Behrman House. ISBN 9780874419795.
- Ellen Bernstein (2024). Toward a Holy Ecology: Reading the Song of Songs in the Age of Climate Crisis. Monkfish Book Publishing. ISBN 9781958972199.

=== Selected articles ===
- "Creating a Sustainable Jewish Ecology". Zeek. October 7, 2007.
- "The Spiritual Advisor Students Need (Hint: It's Not Campus Rabbi Anymore)". The Forward. March 22, 2014.
- "The Seder's secrets to enduring a pandemic". Religion News Service. April 1, 2020.
- "Judaism's Saddest Day". Tikkun. July 16, 2021.
- "The Bible Does Not Validate Endless Exploitation and Domination of the Environment". Tikkun. September 27, 2021.
- "Love and compassion: How women can address the climate crisis". Religion News Service. September 19, 2023.

== Personal life and death ==
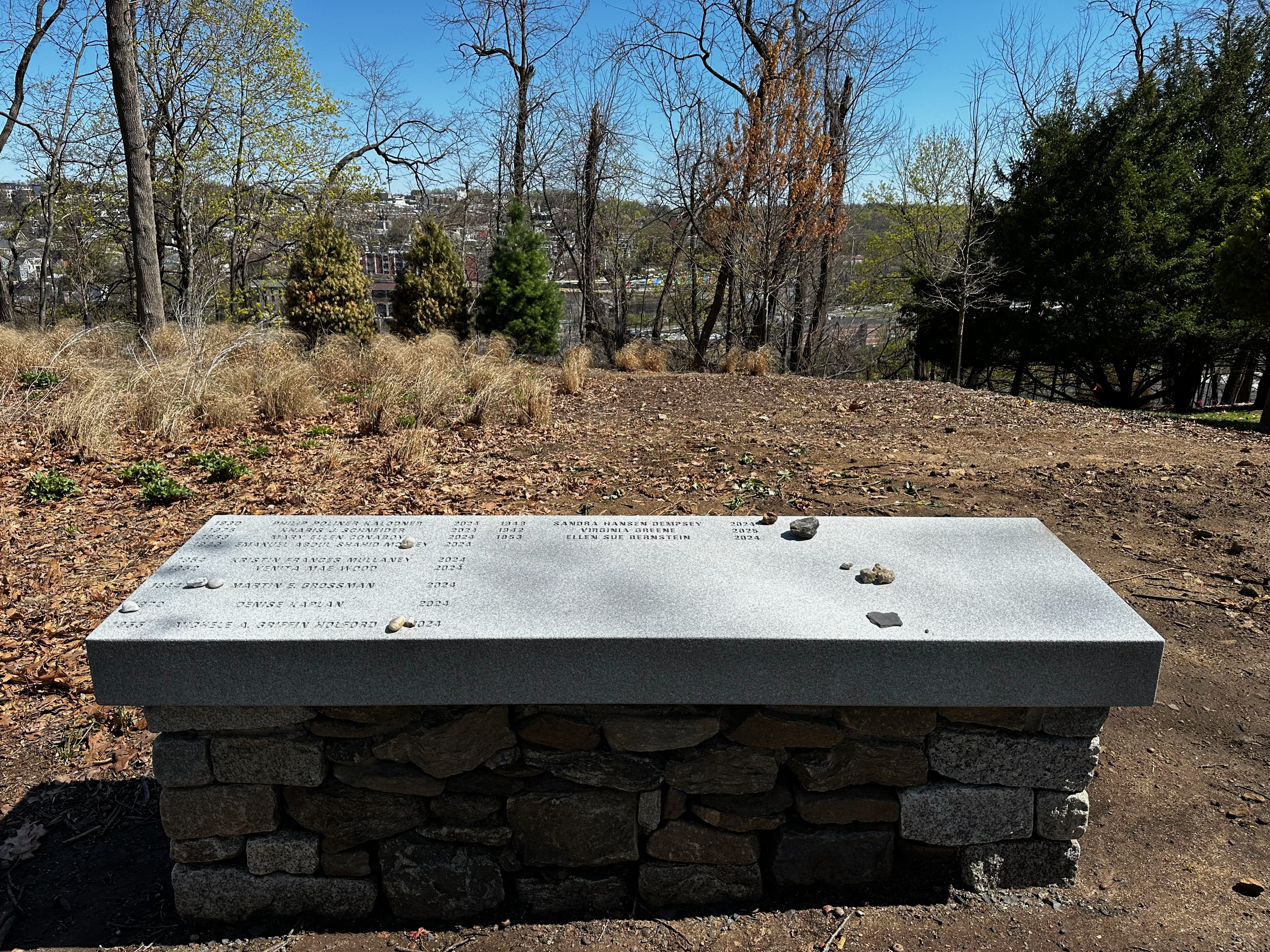
Grave of Rabbi Ellen Sue Bernstein at Laurel Hill Cemetery West in Bala Cynwyd, Pennsylvania

In 2005, Bernstein married Steven Tenenbaum, and the couple moved to Amherst, Massachusetts.

Bernstein entered hospice care in Philadelphia in February 2024 following a diagnosis of colon cancer. She died on February 27, at the age of 70. Per her wishes, she was given a green burial at Laurel Hill Cemetery West in Bala Cynwyd, Pennsylvania.
