= Coalition on the Environment and Jewish Life =

US Jewish environmental organization

The Coalition on the Environment and Jewish Life (COEJL) is a leading Jewish environmental organization in the United States. It was founded in 1993 and is based in Washington, D.C.

COEJL promotes policies and programs that help increase energy efficiency, promote energy independence and security, protect land and water resources, and build core Jewish knowledge on environmental issues while serving as a Jewish voice in the broader interfaith community. COEJL has also begun to focus specifically on federal advocacy on international climate finance, the Clean Power Plan, and conservation since moving to Washington. COEJL has been an initiative at the Jewish Council for Public Affairs since 1993 and serves as the Jewish partner in the National Religious Partnership on the Environment (NRPE).

Sybil Sanchez became the executive director in 2010, after the post being vacated for four years. Rabbi Daniel Swartz later served as the executive director.

== See also ==
- Jewish Council for Public Affairs
