= Naomi Tsur =

Israeli politician

- נעמי צור
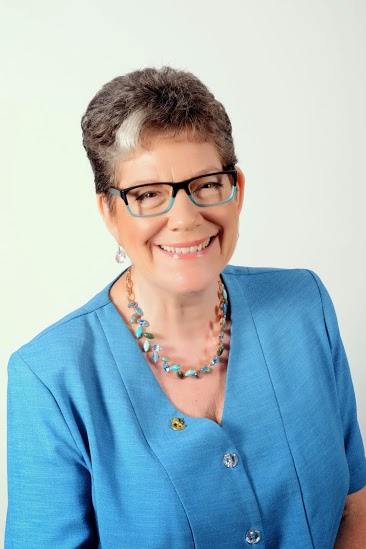
- Naomi Tsur, deputy mayor of Jerusalem, leading the Ometz Lev party

Deputy Mayor of Jerusalem
- In office 2008–2013

Personal details
- Born: 8 September 1948 (age 77) Bristol, England
- Party: Ometz Lev
- Spouse: Haim Tsur
- Children: 4 children, 9 grandchildren

Naomi Tsur (Hebrew: נעמי צור; born 8 September 1948) is an Israeli environmentalist, politician and former deputy mayor of Jerusalem. As deputy mayor, Naomi Tsur was responsible for strategic planning, environmental protection, sustainability and historic conservation.

== Biography ==
Tsur was born and raised in Bristol. Her father, Joseph, was a professor of Medicine at the Jerusalem's Hebrew University and one of the founders of the medical center at Ein Karem.

In 1973 she earned a Bachelor of Arts in archaeology and classics from the Hebrew University. In 1975 she completed part of a Master of Arts in comparative linguistics from the Hebrew University of Jerusalem.

Tsur is married to musician and composer Haim Tsur, who worked for many years at the Voice of Israel, and is the mother of four. Her daughter Michal Tsur was named by The Inc as one of the "10 Women to Watch in Tech in 2013," and is co-founder of Kaltura and Cyota.

== Academic and curatorial career ==
In 1982 -1995 Tsur was a research fellow at the Hebrew University. In 1997, she published a Hebrew-English, English-Hebrew Dictionary with Arie Comey.

In 1995–1996 she worked as an assistant coin curator at the Rockefeller Museum in Jerusalem.

== Political career ==
Tsur was head of the Ometz Lev party that ran for the city council of Jerusalem in October 2013. Before her term as deputy mayor she was head of the Society for the Protection of Nature in Israel in Jerusalem and coordinator of the Sustainable Jerusalem organization. Tsur fought to prevent urban sprawl into the Jerusalem Hills which would add 20,000 housing units using a western Jerusalem beltway inside the green Jerusalem hills. She also led Jerusalem's recycling revolution, and integrated urban nature into planning major projects of significant public areas, such as the Gazelle Valley Urban Nature Park and the Railway Park.

=== Deputy mayor 2008–2013 ===
In 2008 Tsur was appointed deputy mayor of Jerusalem, receiving the Planning and Environmental Portfolios in the elected Jerusalem Council. Tsur demanded transparency and public inclusion in the planning process of Jerusalem. As deputy mayor she helped to restore the Street of the Prophets (Haneveim) . She was active in building the railway park, the planned circuit of bike paths for Jerusalem. Tsur also led campaigns for recycling, dialogue with the Palestinians on sewage issues, affordable housing regulations and the removal of private cars from the old city. Under her leadership 10,000 trees were planted inside the city on Tu Bi’Shvat.

== Public activism ==
In 1987–95 Tsur served as chairperson of the National Religious Sector of the Jerusalem District Parents' Committee and was appointed honorary director of the Jerusalem Council for Children and Youth. In 1996 Tsur began her 12-year tenure as head of the Society for the Protection of Nature in Israel in Jerusalem, during which she formed the Sustainable Jerusalem organization, a coalition of 60 organizations and committees around the city. She initiated a project to assess the true land reserves in Jerusalem which led to the cancellation of the Safdi Plan for construction in West Jerusalem.

In addition she gained approval for the first urban nature park in Israel, Gazelle Valley, the construction of the Rail-road Park and the protection of the wild flower preservation at Neve Yaakov. These were achieved by inviting surrounding neighborhoods to be stakeholders in the planning process.

In 2007 Tsur was appointed director of SPNI branches and Urban Community Centers.

In 2009. she envisaged the establishment of a global network bringing together pilgrimage cities and religious communities in order to improve the conduct of host cities to ensure a green and sustainable experience. The global Green Pilgrimage Network was launched in Assisi in Italy at the end of 2011, and Tsur was appointed ambassador of the network.

Tsur heads the Green Pilgrim Jerusalem team. Describing the 2013 First International Jerusalem Symposium on Green and Accessible Pilgrimage Tsur stated: "The idea is at once both grand and simple, since while there is nothing new in pilgrimage, the idea of a global pilgrim partnership is an entirely new concept, which sets goals for urban sustainability and economic growth on the one hand, and for interfaith dialogue on the other."

Tsur speaks at International Conferences focused on the Environment and Civil Society in Israel. She represented Sustainable Jerusalem at the World Summit on sustainable development at Johannesburg, South Africa. In 2003 she represented Sustainable Jerusalem at the International Healthy City Conference in Belfast. Tsur also led the delegation at the ICLEI conference in Cape Town in Spring of 2006.

== Awards and recognition ==
In 2022, she received the Bonei Zion Prize in the Lifetime Achievement category.

== Published works ==
- New User Friendly English Hebrew English Dictionary. Arie Comey and Naomi Tsur. Achiasaf Publishing House. 2000. ISBN 978-1857332445.

== See also ==
- Women of Israel
