= 1928 in Mandatory Palestine =

- 1928 in the British Mandate of Palestine
«««
1927
1926
1925
»»»
1929
1930
1931
See also:
1928 in the United Kingdom
Other events of 1928

Events in the year 1928 in the British Mandate of Palestine.

== Incumbents ==
- High Commissioner – Herbert Onslow Plumer until 6 December; Sir John Chancellor
- Emir of Transjordan – Abdullah I bin al-Hussein
- Prime Minister of Transjordan – Hasan Khalid Abu al-Huda

== Events ==
- 20 February – The first Anglo-Tranjordanian treaty is concluded following which the Emirate of Transjordan becomes nominally independent, while Britain retains a degree of control over foreign affairs, armed forces, communications and state finances. The treaty fails to respond to Transjordanian demands for a fully sovereign and independent state.
- 20 June – Seventh Palestine Arab Congress.
- 25 July – The first national Transjordanian Congress is held in Amman and calls for an independent state and the protection of the people's rights.
- 23 September – The Western Wall incident occurs at the Western Wall in Jerusalem, leading to Muslim fears of Jewish intentions to take possession of the Al Aqsa Mosque and triggering intercommunal violence that later spreads across Mandatory Palestine.
- 4 December – The founding of the kibbutz Beit HaShita by members of "Kvuzat HaHugim" and members of "Tnuat HaMahanot HaOlim" from Haifa and Jerusalem.
- 6 December – Sir John Chancellor assumes office as the High Commissioner of Palestine.

== Notable births ==
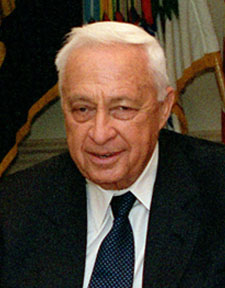
Ariel Sharon

- 14 February – Avner Treinin, Israeli poet and chemist (died 2011).
- 27 February – Ariel Sharon, 11th Prime Minister of Israel (died 2014).
- 4 April – Eli Zeira, Israeli general, commander of the IDF Military Intelligence Directorare (died 2025).
- 18 April – Benny Peled, commander of the Israeli Air Force (died 2002).
- 9 May – Didi Menussi, Israeli writer, journalist, and poet (died 2013).
- 11 May – Yaacov Agam, Israeli sculptor and artist (died 2026).
- 30 May – Gavriel Cohen, Israeli academic and politician (died 2021).
- 21 June
  - Shlomo Baum, Israeli military officer and right-win.g activist (died 1999).
  - Avraham Bendori, Israeli footballer (died 2019)
- 29 June – Uri Gallin, Israeli Olympic discus thrower (died 2021).
- 9 July – Yisroel Yaakov Fisher, Israeli rabbi and posek (died 2003).
- 26 July – Netiva Ben-Yehuda, Israeli writer and lexicographer (died 2011).
- 13 August – Yehuda Lapidot, Israeli biochemistry professor, historian, and Irgun commander (died 2026).
- 14 August – Amotz Zahavi, Israeli evolutionary biologist (died 2017).
- 17 September – Gil Aldema, Israeli composer and conductor (died 2014).
- 16 October – Hanna Abu-Hanna, Palestinian writer (died 2022)
- 4 November – Shaike Ophir, Israeli actor and comedian (died 1987).
- 11 November – Nisim Elmaliah, Israeli footballer (died 1989).
- 19 November - Emanuel Hatzofe, Israeli sculptor (died 2019).
- 26 December – Mordechai Bar-On, Israeli military officer and historian (died 2021).
- 27 December – Shulamit Aloni, Israeli politician and left-wing activist (died 2014).
- Full date unknown
  - Yigal Cohen, Israeli politician (died 1988)
  - Khaled al-Hassan, Palestinian Arab, founder member of Fatah (died 1994).
  - Bracha Eden, Israeli pianist (died 2006).
  - Samira Abu Ghazaleh, Palestinian activist, writer and professor.(died 2017)
