= 1935 in Mandatory Palestine =

- 1935 in the British Mandate of Palestine
«««
1934
1933
1932
»»»
1936
1937
1938
See also:
1935 in the United Kingdom
Other events of 1935

Events in the year 1935 in the British Mandate of Palestine.

== Incumbents ==
- High Commissioner – Sir Arthur Grenfell Wauchope
- Emir of Transjordan – Abdullah I bin al-Hussein
- Prime Minister of Transjordan – Ibrahim Hashem

== Events ==
- According to official statistics there were 61,854 Jewish immigrants during 1935.
- A split occurred between traditional Zionists and Revisionists, who endorsed the use of violence to establish a Zionist state.
- Arab leadership accepted a British proposal for a legislative assembly by the British High Commissioner, but it was rejected by the British House of Commons in 1936.
- 4 January – The British open the Mosul–Haifa oil pipeline, a major oil pipeline between the Mosul oil fields in Iraq and the Mediterranean port of Haifa in Palestine.
- 10 February – Nahariya is founded.
- April – Palestine Arab Party established.
- 2–10 April – 2nd Maccabiah Games are held in Tel Aviv, despite British opposition.
- 5–6 May – Renowned Egyptian singer Umm Kulthum performs in the Mugrabi Theater in Tel Aviv, continuing after to Jerusalem and Haifa.
- 23 June – Reform Party (Mandatory Palestine) established.
- 16 October – Discovery of a Zionist arms shipment at the port of Jaffa leads to unrest throughout Palestine.
- November – The Arab political parties demanded an end to Jewish immigration and land transfer, as well as the establishment of democratic institutions.
- 20 November – Sheikh Muhammad Izz ad-Din al-Qassam, the Sunni Islamic preacher and leader of the armed organization Black Hand which used violence against Jewish civilians and the British, is killed in a gunbattle with British police forces near Jenin.

== Unknown dates ==
- National Bloc (Mandatory Palestine) established.

== Births ==
- 7 January – Noam Sheriff, Israeli composer and conductor (died 2018)
- 18 January – Gad Yaacobi, Israeli minister, ambassador to the United Nations, and Labor Party Knesset member (died 2007)
- 19 January – Ilan Amit, Israeli strategist, government adviser, and Mossad analyst (died 2013)
- 1 February – Ze'ev Almog, Israeli naval officer, former Commander in Chief of the Israeli Navy and manager of Israel Shipyards.
- 17 February – Uri Ilan, Israeli soldier who committed suicide in Syrian captivity, national hero in Israel (died 1955)
- 27 February – Yaakov Turner, Israeli politician, military officer, and police commander, mayor of Beersheba (died 2024)
- 24 March – Jacob Turkel, Israeli judge, former judge on the Supreme Court of Israel (died 2023)
- 29 March – Boaz Kofman, Israeli footballer and football manager (died 2016)
- 2 April – Uriel Lynn, Israeli lawyer and politician
- 8 April – Avi Primor, Israeli diplomat and publicist
- 15 June – Shimon Even, Israeli computer scientist (died 2004)
- 1 July – Shmulik Kraus, Israeli singer and actor (died 2013)
- 13 July – Dan Almagor, Israeli playwright
- 9 September – Chaim Topol, Israeli actor (died 2023)
- 30 October – Avraham Stern, Israeli politician (died 1997)
- 1 November – Edward Said, Palestinian-American literary theorist (died 2003)
- 4 November – Uri Zohar, former Israeli film director, actor, and comedian who left the entertainment world to become a rabbi (died 2022).
- 15 November – Mahmoud Abbas, Chairman of the Palestinian National Authority
- 24 November – Shlomo Amar, Israeli politician
- 15 December – Adnan Badran, former Jordanian Prime Minister
- 24 December – Arnon Soffer, Israeli demographer (died 2026)
- Full date unknown
  - Said Aburish, Palestinian Arab journalist and writer (died 2012).
  - Imil Jarjoui, Palestinian Arab politician (died 2007).
  - Avigdor Nebenzahl, Israeli rabbi and posek
  - Moshe Levinger, Israeli rabbi and settlement activist (died 2015).
  - Eitan Tchernov, Israeli conservationist (died 2002).
  - David Ussishkin, Israeli archaeologist.

== Deaths ==
- 9 June – Shmaryahu Levin (born 1867), Russian (Belarus)-born rabbi and Zionist activist.
- 1 September – Abraham Isaac Kook (born 1865), Russian (Latvia)-born first Ashkenazi chief rabbi of the British Mandate for Palestine.
- 20 November – Izz ad-Din al-Qassam (born 1882), Syrian-born Palestinian Muslim cleric who founded and headed the militant Black Hand movement and a number of other extreme anti-Jewish and anti-British groups. He was based in Haifa and president of the Young Men's Muslim Association there.
