= 1930 in Mandatory Palestine =

- 1930 in the British Mandate of Palestine
«««
1929
1928
1927
»»»
1931
1932
1933
See also:
1930 in the United Kingdom

Events in the year 1930 in the British Mandate of Palestine.

== Incumbents ==
- High Commissioner - Sir John Chancellor
- Emir of Transjordan - Abdullah I bin al-Hussein
- Prime Minister of Transjordan - Hasan Khalid Abu al-Huda

== Events ==
- 5 January - The left-wing political party Mapai is founded by the merger of the Hapoel Hatzair (founded by A. D. Gordon) and the original Ahdut HaAvoda (founded in 1919 from the more moderate, right-wing of the Marxist Zionist socialist Russian party Poale Zion, led by David Ben-Gurion).
- March - The Commission on the Palestine disturbances of August, 1929 presents the Shaw Report to the british parliament. The Report investigates the disturbances in 1929 and gives recommendations for preventing further disturbances and addresses the causes of the conflict.
- 17 June - 3 Arab Palestinians hanged for their part in the August 1929 riots. 25 other prisoners, two of them Jewish, had their death sentences commuted. The day was remembered by Palestinians as "Red Tuesday".
- 21 October - The Hope Simpson Royal Commission publishes the Hope Simpson Report, following the widespread 1929 Palestine riots, which recommends limiting Jewish immigration, claiming a lack of agricultural land to support such immigration.
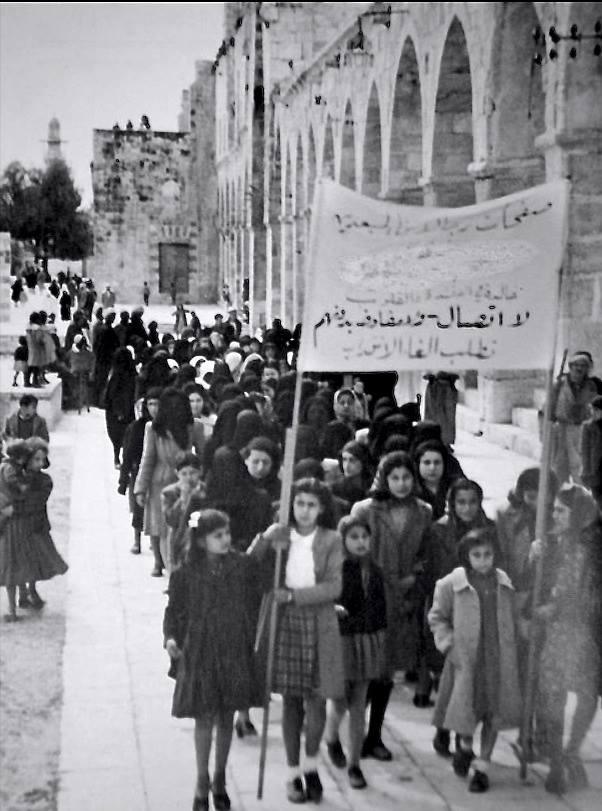
  Palestinian women in a protest in Jerusalem, Palestine 1930. The sign reads "No dialogue, no negotiations until termination [of the Mandate]"
- 21 October - Lord Passfield, the Secretary of State for the Colonies, issues a white paper, a formal statement of the British policy in Palestine, outlining a more restrictive british policy towards jewish immigration and land settlement.

=== Unknown dates ===
- The founding of the kibbutz Na'an by 42 members of the Noar HaOved youth group, on lands purchased from the Arabic village Al-Na'ani.
- Two prominent Palestinian women, Sadhij Nassar and Mariam al-Khalil, founded Arab Women’s Union of Haifa.

== Births ==
- 7 February - David Bar-Ilan, Israeli pianist, author, political spokesman, and columnist (died 2003).
- 15 March - Edna Solodar, Israeli politician (died 2024).
- April - Yaëla Hertz, Israeli-Canadian teacher (died 2014)
- 5 April - Dov Lando, Israeli rabbi
- 19 April - Yardena Alotin, Israeli composer and pianist (died 1994).
- 2 May - Yoram Kaniuk, Israeli writer, painter, journalist, and theater critic (died 2013).
- 6 May - Mordechai Gur, Israeli general and politician, tenth Chief of Staff of the IDF (died 1995).
- 5 June - Reuven Adiv, Israeli actor, director, and drama teacher, head of acting at the Drama Centre London (died 2004).
- 13 July - Naomi Shemer, leading Israeli songwriter and composer (died 2004).
- 15 August - Emmanuel Shaked, Israeli general (died 2018).
- 23 August - Yair Tzaban, Israeli politician and academic.
- 1 September - Ora Namir, Israeli politician and diplomat (died 2019).
- 11 October – Zev Buffman, theatre producer, President and CEO of Ruth Eckerd Hall (died 2020).
- 3 November - Shalom Cohen, Israeli rabbi (died 2022)
- 7 December - Dani Karavan, Israeli sculptor and painter (died 2021) .
- 10 December - Muhammad Youssef al-Najjar, Palestinian Arab militant and leader of Black September (died 1973).
- 22 December - Amnon Kapeliouk, Israeli journalist and author (died 2009).
- Full date unknown
  - Gad Avigad, Israeli biochemist.
  - Yoel Alroy, Israeli footballer and politician (died 2023).
  - Amnon Yariv, Israeli-American applied physicist and electrical engineer

== Deaths ==
- 17 June - Fuad Hijazi. Acre Prison.
- 17 June - Ata El-Zeer. Acre Prison.
- 17 June - Mohammad Khaleel Jamjoum. Acre Prison.
