= 1931 in Mandatory Palestine =

- 1931 in the British Mandate of Palestine
«««
1930
1929
1928
»»»
1932
1933
1934
See also:
1931 in the United Kingdom
Other events of 1931

Events in the year 1931 in the British Mandate of Palestine.

== Incumbents ==
- High Commissioner – Sir John Chancellor until 20 November; Sir Arthur Grenfell Wauchope
- Emir of Transjordan – Abdullah I bin al-Hussein
- Prime Minister of Transjordan – Hasan Khalid Abu al-Huda until 22 February; Abdallah Sarraj

== Events ==
- 5 January – Third Jewish Assembly of Representatives election.
- March – The Press Bureau is reconstituted under a junior assistant secretary to improve the government’s communication with press and ensure better scrutiny of newspapers.
- 10 April – The Irgun is founded by Avraham Tehomi and former Haganah commanders who rejected the policy of "havlagah" and sought more action against Arab violence.
- 11 April – Three members of kibbutz Yagur are killed by members of a local Arab gang.
- 19 May – An Order in Council is issued by King George V relating to the Western Wall. This legally enshrined the Wall's status: Muslim ownership is affirmed, but Jews are guaranteed free access for prayer under specific conditions.
- 18 November – The 1931 census of Palestine is carried out by the Mandate authorities under the direction of Major E. Mills.
- 20 November – Sir Arthur Grenfell Wauchope replaces Sir John Chancellor as High Commissioner of Palestine.
- 22 December – Two members of Nahala Moshav, a man and his son, are killed when a bomb is thrown into their home. The attack is attributed to members of the Black Hand Gang.

== Births ==
- 17 January – Yaakov Gil, Israeli politician (died 2007)
- 13 February – Assaf Yaguri, Israeli politician and soldier (died 2000)
- 8 August – Yehoshua Matza, Israeli politician (died 2020)
- 16 May – Geula Zylberman, Jewish-Palestinian born Venezuelan artist
- 24 May – Eliezer Goldberg, Israeli jurist, judge on the Israeli Supreme Court and former State Comptroller of Israel (died 2022)
- 28 July – Michal Har'el, Israeli beauty queen (died 2012)
- 5 September – Amnon Rubinstein, Israeli law scholar, politician, and columnist (died 2024)
- 20 September – Haya Harareet, Israeli actress (died 2021)
- 21 September – Shmuel Auerbach, Israeli Haredi rabbi and posek (died 2018)
- 8 October – Sara Kishon, Israeli musician, author, and art collector (died 2002)
- 27 October – Shalom Cohen, Israeli rabbi and rosh yeshiva, spiritual leader of the Shas party (died 2022)
- 17 November – Amira Sartani, Israeli politician
- 27 November – Yaakov Ziv, Israeli computer scientist (died 2023)
- Full date unknown
  - Naim Attallah, Palestinian Arab businessman and writer (died 2021)
  - Ruth Horam, Israeli painter and sculptor (died 2021)
  - Avraham Katz, Israeli politician (died 1986)
  - Farouk Kaddoumi, Palestinian Arab, senior member of Fatah (died 2024)
  - Shaul Foguel, Israeli mathematician (died 2020)
  - Taha Muhammad Ali, Israeli Arab poet (died 2011).
  - Ram Karmi, Israeli architect (died 2013)

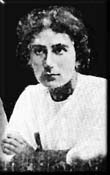
Rachel Bluwstein

== Deaths ==
- 16 April – Rachel Bluwstein (commonly referred to as "Rachel the poetess") (born 1890), Russia-born Palestinian Jewish poet.
