= 1936 in Mandatory Palestine =

- 1936 in the British Mandate of Palestine
«««
1935
1934
1933
»»»
1937
1938
1939
See also:
1936 in the United Kingdom
Other events of 1936

Events in the year 1936 in the British Mandate of Palestine.

== Incumbents ==
- High Commissioner – Sir Arthur Grenfell Wauchope
- Emir of Transjordan – Abdullah I bin al-Hussein
- Prime Minister of Transjordan – Ibrahim Hashem

== Events ==
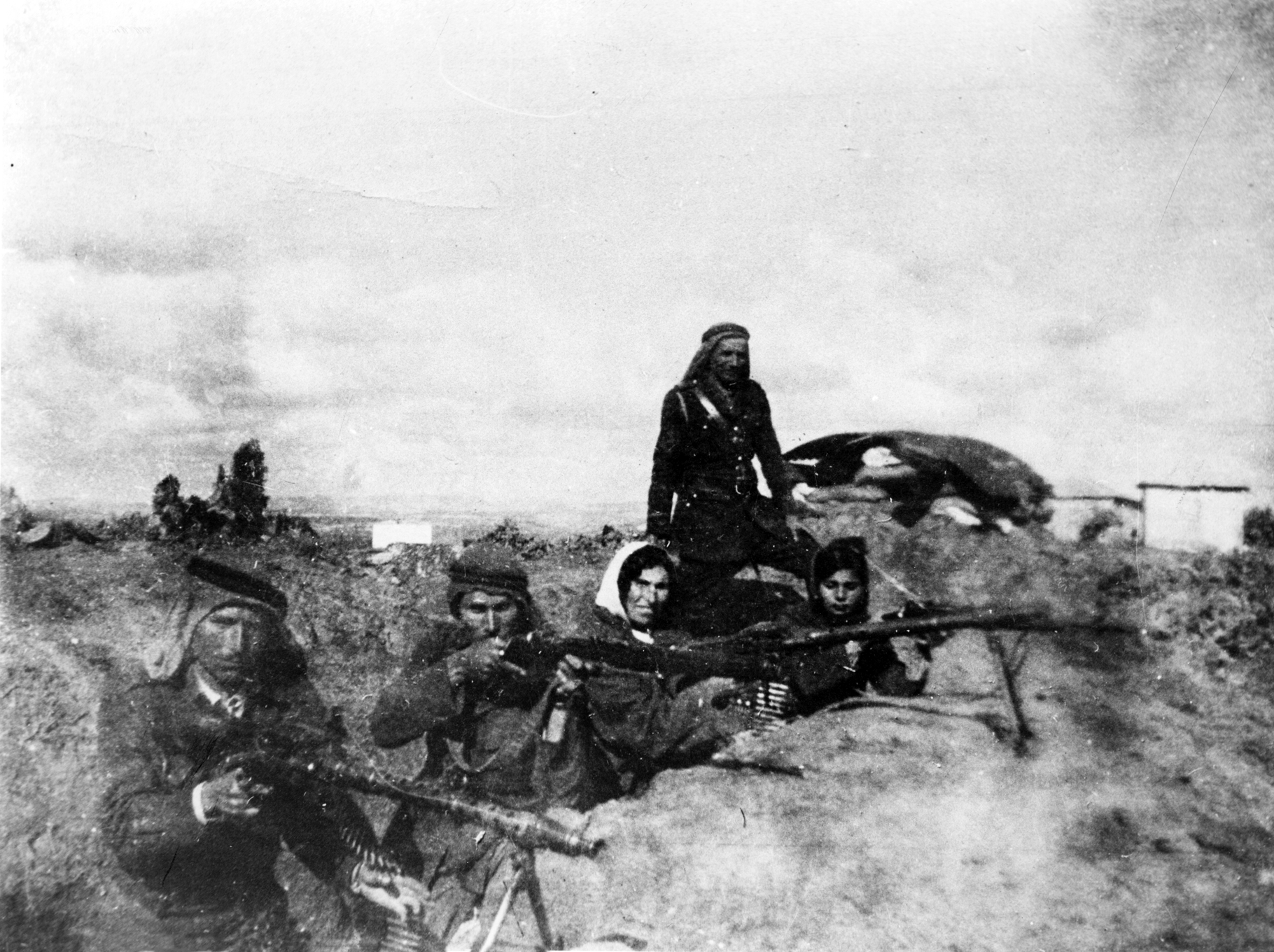
Arab revolt in Palestine: A photograph of Palestinian guerillas, c. 1936

- 11 February - The founding of the moshav Rishpon.
- 15 April - The Anabta shooting, where remnants of a Qassamite band stopped a convoy on the road from Nablus to Tulkarm near Jaffa, robbed its passengers and, stating that they were acting to revenge the death of Izz al-Din al-Qassam, shot 3 Jewish passengers, two fatally, after ascertaining their identity.
- 16 April - two Arab workers sleeping in a hut in a banana plantation beside the highway between Petah Tikva and Yarkona were assassinated in retaliation by members of the Haganah-Bet.
- 19 April – Twenty Jews are killed in riots following the funeral of two Jews murdered on 15 April in Jaffa and calls for a general strike begin in Nablus, marking the beginning of the 1936–1939 Arab revolt in Palestine against British rule and mass Jewish immigration.
- 21 April - The leaders of the five main parties accept the decision at Nablus and call for a general strike of all Arabs engaged in labour, transport and shopkeeping.
- 23 April – With the commencement of the Arab revolt, the British authorities evacuate the Jewish community of Hebron as a precautionary measure to secure its members' safety, thus ending the Jewish presence of Hebron.
- 25 April – The Arab Higher Committee is established on the initiative of the Mufti of Jerusalem Hajj Amin al-Husayni, to oppose British rule and Jewish claims in Palestine.
- 16 May - Amin al-Husseini, president of the Arab Higher Committee and Mufti of Jerusalem, declares 16 May as 'Palestine Day' and officially calls for a general strike, which lasts until October of 1936.
- 18 May - Announcement of the Peel Commission, formally known as the Palestine Royal Commission, a British Royal Commission of Inquiry, headed by Lord Peel, appointed to investigate the causes of unrest in British Mandatory Palestine.
- 02 June - An attempt by rebels to derail a train bringing the 2nd Battalion Bedfordshire and Hertfordshire Regiment from Egypt led to the railways being put under guard, placing a great strain on the security forces at Nablus.
- 04 June - In response to the situation two days prior in Nablus, the government rounds up a large number of Palestinian leaders and sends them to a detention camp at Auja al-Hafir in the Negev desert.
- 21 June - The Battle of Nur Shams marks an escalation with the largest engagement of British troops against Arab militants so far in the revolt.
- 29 July - Members of the Peel Commission are officially appointed as follows: Chairman William Peel, 1st Earl Peel and the Vice-Chairman was Sir Horace Rumbold, 9th Baronet. The other members include Sir Laurie Hammond, Sir Morris Carter, Sir Harold Morris, and Reginald Coupland.
- 22 August - Anglo-Jewish Arabist scholar Levi Billig of Hebrew University is murdered at his home outside Jerusalem by an Arab assassin.
- 07 September - Statement of Policy issued by the Colonial Office in London declares the situation a "direct challenge to the authority of the British Government in Palestine" and announces the appointment of Lieutenant-General John Dill as supreme military commander.
- 11 October - The general strike is called off, marking the beginning of a break in hostilities which ensues for about a year while the Peel Commission deliberates.
- 11 November - Peel Commission officially arrives in British Mandatory Palestine.
- 7 December - The founding of the Moshav shitufi Kfar Hittim, the first of the tower and stockade settlement.
- 10 December - The founding of the kibbutz Tel Amal.

== Births ==
- 1 January – Ofira Navon, Israeli psychologist and wife of President Yitzhak Navon (died 1993)
- 8 March – Ram Oren, Israeli author
- 19 March – Uri Aviram, Israeli professor of social work
- 23 March – Israel Eliraz, Israeli poet (died 2016)
- 9 April – Ghassan Kanafani, Palestinian Arab writer, playwright and a leading member of the militant group PFLP (died 1972)
- 17 April – Daniel Friedmann, Israeli law professor and politician
- 18 April – Moshe Levi, Israeli general, 12th IDF Chief of General Staff (died 2008)
- 15 May – Ruth Almog, Israeli novelist
- 31 May – Zevulun Hammer, Israeli politician, minister and Deputy Prime Minister (died 1998)
- 14 June – Avraham Shochat, Israeli politician (died 2024)
- 20 June – Amiram Barkai, Israeli biochemist (died 2014)
- 19 July – Nahum Stelmach, Israeli footballer and manager (died 1999)
- 19 July – Ran Ronen-Pekker, Israeli Air Force general and ace (died 2016)
- 31 July – Uzi Yairi, Israeli special forces officer, commander of the Sayeret Matkal commando unit (died 1975)
- 22 August – Nechama Hendel, Israeli singer, actress, guitarist and entertainer (died 1998)
- 4 September – Judea Pearl, Israeli-American computer scientist and philosopher
- 11 September – Moshe Gershuni, Israeli painter and sculptor (died 2017)
- 7 October – Moshe Abeles, Israeli neuroscientist
- 16 October – David Glass, Israeli civil servant and politician (died 2014)
- 28 October - Joram Lindenstrauss, Israeli mathematician (died 2012)
- 5 November – Amos Yudan, Israeli businessman
- 17 November – Dahlia Ravikovitch, Israeli poet (died 2005)
- 27 November – Yitzhak Yitzhaky, Israeli educator and politician (died 1994)
- 27 November – Shlomo Aronson, Israeli landscape architect (died 2018)
- 27 November – Zaid al-Rifai, former Jordanian Prime Minister (died 2024)
- 3 December – Adam Zertal, Israeli archaeologist (died 2015)
- 19 December – A. B. Yehoshua, Israeli novelist, essayist, and playwright (died 2022)
- 25 December – Masha Lubelsky, Israeli politician
- Full date unknown
  - Yoram Dinstein, Israeli legal scholar, law professor, and diplomat (died 2024)
  - Dov Tamari, Israeli general

== Deaths ==
- 23 September - Meir Dizengoff (born 1861), Russian (Bessarabia)-born Zionist politician and the first mayor of Tel Aviv
