= 1933 in Mandatory Palestine =

- 1933 in the British Mandate of Palestine
«««
1932
1931
1930
»»»
1934
1935
1936
See also:
1933 in the United Kingdom
Other events of 1933

Events in the year 1933 in the British Mandate of Palestine.

== Incumbents ==
- High Commissioner – Sir Arthur Grenfell Wauchope
- Emir of Transjordan – Abdullah I bin al-Hussein
- Prime Minister of Transjordan – Abdallah Sarraj until 18 October; Ibrahim Hashem

== Events ==
Footage shot in Bethlehem, Jerusalem, Jericho, Nazareth and Tiberias, 1933

- According to official statistics there were 30,327 Jewish immigrants during 1933.
- 1 January – Establishment of the cooperative bus company Egged through a merger of four smaller bus cooperatives.
- 30 January – The Zionist Youth Aliyah movement is founded in Germany with the aim of arranging the resettlement of Jewish youth in Palestine in kibbutzim and youth villages, where they would be trained for agricultural work.
- 16 June – Assassination of Haim Arlosoroff: Left-wing Zionist leader Haim Arlosoroff is assassinated while walking with his wife on the beach in Tel Aviv.
- October – The founding of kibbutz Mishmarot by Jewish immigrants from Russia, Lithuania and Latvia.
- 27 October – Following the discovery in Jaffa harbour of a large shipment of weapons destined for an address in Tel Aviv the Arab Executive calls a general strike. A demonstration in Jaffa led by the president of the Executive, Musa al-Husayni, turned into a riot in which a crowd of several thousand attacked the small force of policemen who responded with baton charges and gunfire. 26 demonstrators and one policeman were killed. Amongst the 187 injured was 80-year-old Musa al-Husayni, who never recovered and died the following year. There followed six weeks of rioting in all the major towns in which 24 civilians are killed. The disorders were suppressed by the police, not the army. They were different from earlier disturbances in that the targets were British Government institutions rather than Jews.
- 13 November – The founding of the moshav Elyashiv by Jewish immigrants from Yemen, which was the first settlement to be established by Yemenite Jews.

=== Unknown dates ===
- The founding of the moshav Ramot HaShavim by Jewish German immigrants of the Fifth Aliyah.

== Notable births ==
- 31 January – Shimon Levinson, Israeli intelligence officer who spied for the KGB.
- 4 February – David Golomb, Israeli economist and politician (died 2019).
- 14 February – Gedalia Gal, Israeli politician.
- 22 February – Gideon Patt, Israeli politician (died 2020).
- 19 March – Michel Sabbah, Palestinian Christian, former Archbishop and Latin Patriarch of Jerusalem.
- 5 October – Avraham Bar-Am, Israeli general.
- 24 October – Yoram Aridor, Israeli former politician.
- 18 December – Tamar Golan, Israeli journalist and diplomat (died 2011).
- Full date unknown
  - Salah Khalaf, Palestinian Arab, founder of the terrorist group Black September and a senior Fatah official. (died 1991)

== Notable deaths ==
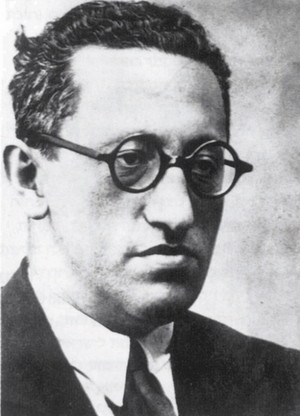
Haim Arlosoroff

- 16 June – Haim Arlosoroff (born 1899), Russian (Ukraine)-born left-wing Zionist leader, leader of the Labor Zionist movement in Palestine during the mandate period and head of the political department of the Jewish Agency. Assassinated.
