= Barkai (surname) =

Barkai is a surname. Notable people with the surname include:

- Amiram Barkai (1936–2014), Israeli biochemist
- Avraham Barkai (1921–2020), German-born Israeli historian
- Eli Barkai (born 1964), Israeli physicist
- Gabriel Barkai (born 1944), Hungarian-born Israeli archeologist
- Michael Barkai (1935–1999), Romanian-born Israeli Navy commander
- Razi Barkai (born 1949), Israeli media personality
- Ram Barkai (born 1957), Israeli-South African businessman and swimmer
