= 1932 in Mandatory Palestine =

- 1932 in the British Mandate of Palestine
«««
1931
1930
1929
»»»
1933
1934
1935
See also:
1932 in the United Kingdom
Other events of 1932

Events in the year 1932 in the British Mandate of Palestine.

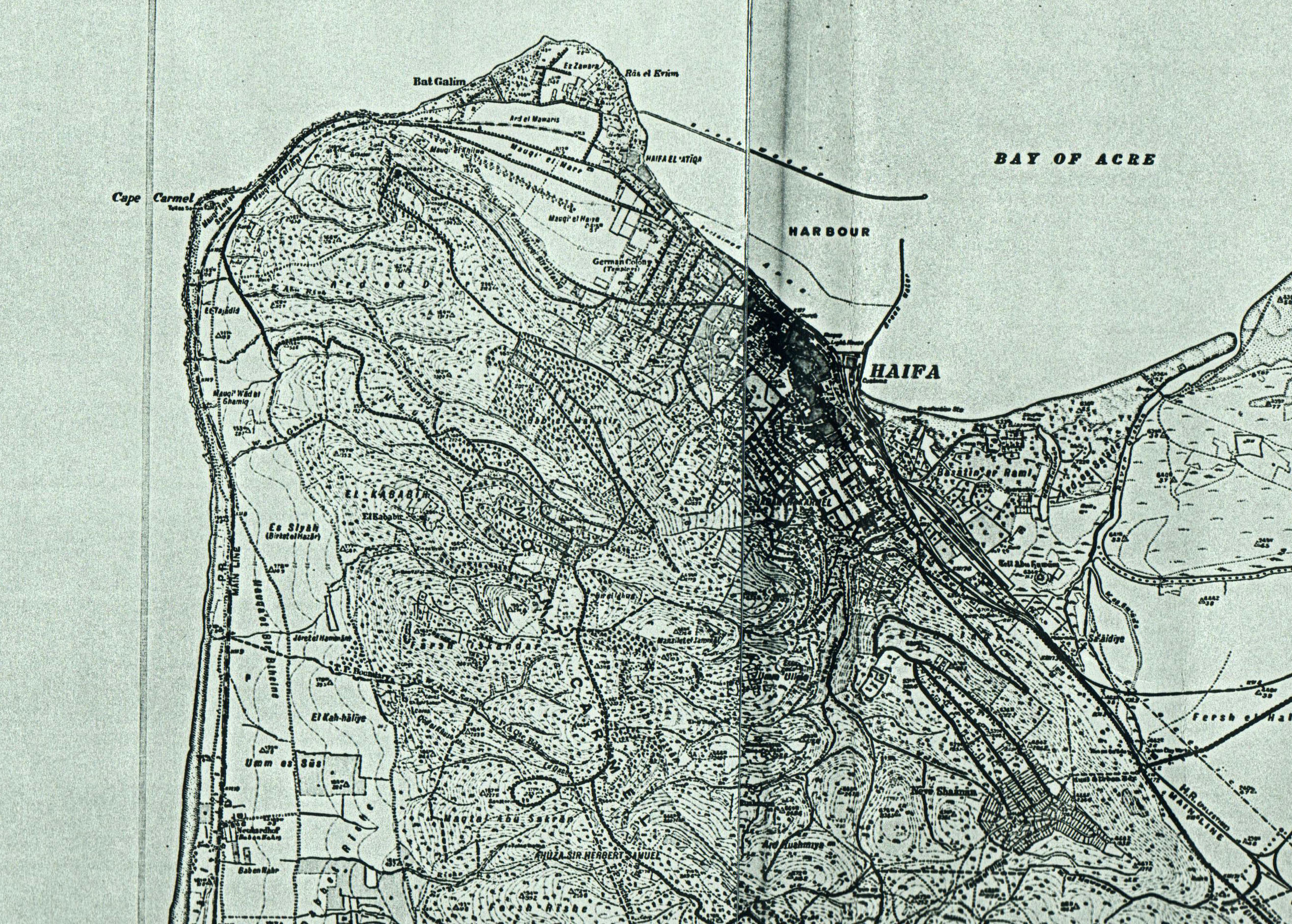
Haifa 1932 1:20,000

== Incumbents ==
- High Commissioner – Sir Arthur Grenfell Wauchope
- Emir of Transjordan – Abdullah I bin al-Hussein
- Prime Minister of Transjordan – Abdallah Sarraj

== Events ==
- 23 January – The founding of Kfar Yona.
- 28 March – The 1932 Maccabiah Games, the first Maccabiah Games ever held, are opened in Tel Aviv.
- 13 August – The Independence Party (Mandatory Palestine) is established.
- 1 December – The Palestine Post (now The Jerusalem Post) is published for the first time.

=== Unknown dates ===
- The founding of kibbutz Afikim by Russian Jews affiliated with the Hashomer Hatzair movement.
- The founding of the moshav Tel-Tzur by the Herzliya Hebrew Gymnasium teachers led by Haim Boger. The moshav was later on merged with Even Yehuda.
- The founding of the moshav Beer Ganim by former employees of the Dead Sea Works company. The moshav was later on merged with Even Yehuda.
- The founding of the moshav Ramat Tyomkin. The moshav merged with Netanya in 1948.
- The founding of the moshav Neta'im by residents of other moshavim as part of the Settlement of the Thousand plan.
- The founding of the moshava Even Yehuda by the "Bne Binyamin" association on the lands acquired by the philanthropist Samuel S. Bloom.

== Notable births ==
- 12 January – Itzik Kol, Israeli film producer (died 2007).
- 13 January – Shafiq al-Hout, Palestinian Arab politician and writer, co-founder of the PLO (died 2009).
- 1 February – Batsheva Kanievsky, Israeli rebbetzin (died 2011).
- 10 February – Yosef Ba-Gad, Israeli politician and Rosh yeshiva.
- 22 February – Zvi Ofer, Israeli soldier, former military governor of Nablus (died 1968).
- 22 March – Nehemia Sirkis, Israeli sports shooter and firearms designer (died 2018).
- 2 May – Ariel Weinstein, Israeli politician and journalist (died 1996).
- 9 July – Amitzur Shapira, Israeli athletics coach, murdered at the Munich Olympics (died 1972).
- 25 July – Esther Streit-Wurzel, Israeli children's author and educator (died 2013).
- 21 August – Menashe Kadishman, Israeli painter and sculptor (died 2015).
- 28 August – Yakir Aharonov, Israeli physicist.
- 9 October – Dvora Omer, Israeli author (died 2013).
- 31 October – Ruth Rasnic, Israeli social and political activist.
- 5 November – Yossi Banai, Israeli performer, singer, actor, and dramatist (died 2006).
- 13 November - Nahum Rakover, Israeli jurist.
- 19 November – Abdel Rahman Zuabi, Israeli-Arab judge, first Arab to serve as a judge on the Supreme Court of Israel (died 2014).
- 20 November - Yona Fischer, Israeli art curator (died 2022).
- 23 December – Avraham Sharir, Israeli politician (died 2017).
- Full date unknown
  - Eli Hurvitz, Israeli industrialist, former chairman and CEO of Teva Pharmaceutical Industries (died 2011).
