= Uri (name) =

Uri (Hebrew: אורי; pronounced [ˈʔuʁi]) is a Hebrew masculine given name.

Notable people named Uri include:

- Uri Adelman (1958–2004), Israeli writer
- Uri Alon (born 1969), Israeli biologist and professor
- Uri Amit (1934–2011), 3rd mayor of Ramat Gan
- Uri Ariel (born 1952), Israeli politician
- Uri Aviram (born 1936), Israeli professor
- Uri Avnery (1923–2018), Israeli writer and peace activist
- Uri Barbash (born 1946), Israeli film director
- Uri Benjamin (born 1954), Israeli footballer
- Uri Bergman (born 1953), Israeli Paralympic swimming champion
- Uri Berliner (born 1956), American journalist
- Urie Bronfenbrenner (1917–2005), American psychologist
- Uri Caine (born 1956), American jazz pianist
- Uri Cohen-Mintz (born 1973), Israeli basketball player
- Uri Coronel (1946–2016), Dutch sports director (AFC Ajax)
- Uri Dadush, French economist, World Bank director
- Uri Davis (born 1943), Israeli/Palestinian academic and activist
- Uri Gallin (1928–2021), Israeli Olympic discus thrower
- Uri Geller (born 1946), Israeli magician and psychic
- Uri Nissan Gnessin (1879–1913), Russian Hebrew-language writer
- Uri Gordon (born 1976), Israeli activist and author
- Uri Zvi Greenberg (1896–1981), Israeli poet and journalist
- Uri Harkham, American businessman
- Uri Kokia (born 1981), Israeli basketball player and coach
- Uri Lubrani (1926–2018), Israeli diplomat, military official, and national security advisor
- Uri Lupolianski (1951–2026), Israeli mayor of Jerusalem from 2003 to 2008
- Uri Magbo (born 1987), Israeli footballer
- Uri Maklev (born 1957), Israeli politician
- Uri Malmilian (born 1957), Israeli football manager and former player
- Uri Orbach (1960–2015), Israeli writer, journalist and politician
- Uri Orlev (1931–2022), Israeli author
- Uri Rosenthal (born 1945), Dutch foreign minister
- Uri Sagi (born 1943), Israeli general
- Uri Savir (1953–2022), Israeli diplomat
- Uri Shoham (born 1948), judge on the Supreme Court of Israel and brigadier-general
- Uri Shulevitz (1935–2025), American author and illustrator
- Uri Sivan (born 1955), Israeli physicist, professor, and President of the Technion – Israel Institute of Technology
- Uri Tracy (1764–1838), American politician
- Uri Tzaig (born 1965), Israeli multimedia artist
- Uri Zohar (1935–2022), Israeli film director, actor and comedian who became a rabbi

== See also ==
- Uri (Bible), two people in the Bible
- Uriel
- Uriah
- Yuri (disambiguation)
