= Abd Allah ibn Abbas ibn Siddiq =

Hanafi Mufti of Mecca

- عبد الله بن عباس بن صديق

Hanafi Mufti of Mecca
- In office c. 1894 – 4 November 1907
- Preceded by: Abd ar-Rahman Siraj
- Succeeded by: Abd Allah Siraj

Personal details
- Born: 1853/1854 Mecca, Habesh Eyalet, Ottoman Empire
- Died: 4 November 1907 Sana'a, Yemen Vilayet, Ottoman Empire

‘Abd Allāh ibn ‘Abbās ibn Ṣiddīq al-Ḥanafī al-Makkī (Arabic: عبد الله بن عباس بن صديق الحنفي المكي; 1853/1854 – 4 November 1907) was the penultimate Hanafi Mufti of Mecca.

Abd Allah ibn Abbas ibn Ja'far ibn Abbas ibn Muhammad ibn Siddiq was born in Mecca in 1270 AH (1853/1854). After memorizing the Qur'an he began seeking knowledge. He studied mostly under his father, whose lectures he attended in fiqh, hadith, and tafsir, and from whom he received ijazah. He also learned from Sayyid Ahmad Dahlan and Shaykh Yusuf al-Kharbuti, and he read the musalsal bi'l-awwaliyah from Shaykh Abu al-Khudayr Muhammad ibn Ibrahim al-Misri. He received permission to teach in the Masjid al-Haram.

In 1311 (1893/1894) or 1312 (1894/1895) he was appointed Mufti of the Hanafis by Sharif Awn ar-Rafiq, on the condition that for assistance he consult with his father Shaykh Abbas and with Shaykh Ahmad Abu al-Khayr Mirdad, who had declined the Sharif's offer to take the post.

In 1907, at the request of Sultan Abd al-Hamid, Sharif Ali sent a delegation of ulema to Yemen, including Abd Allah, Shaykh al-Ulama Muhammad Sa'id Babasil, Shaykh Salih Kamal, and Shaykh Muhammad Khayyat, with the aim of convincing Imam Yahya to end his jihad against the Ottoman state. Shaykh Abd Allah did not return; he died in Sana'a at 2 a.m. on Monday, 27 Ramadan 1325 (4 November 1907) while reciting Qur'an.

He had two sons, Mahdi and Bakr, neither of whom followed him in becoming a student of religion.
