= 1929 in Mandatory Palestine =

- 1929 in the British Mandate of Palestine
«««
1928
1927
1926
»»»
1930
1931
1932
See also:
1929 in the United Kingdom
Other events of 1929

Events in the year 1929 in the British Mandate of Palestine.

== Incumbents ==
- High Commissioner – Sir John Chancellor
- Emir of Transjordan – Abdullah I bin al-Hussein
- Prime Minister of Transjordan – Hasan Khalid Abu al-Huda

== Events ==
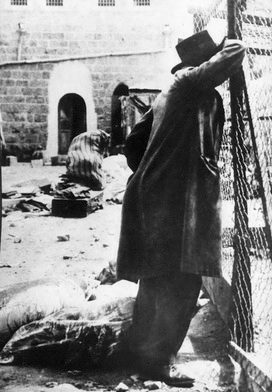
A survivor mourning in the aftermath of the massacre in Hebron.

- 18 February – The founding of the agricultural settlement of Netanya.
- 23 May – The religious Zionist youth movement Bnei Akiva is founded in Jerusalem.
- 23 July – The Pro-Wailing Wall Committee is established by Joseph Klausner, Professor of Modern Hebrew Literature at the Hebrew University, to defend Jewish rights at the Western Wall.
- 14 August – A 6,000-strong protest meeting in Tel Aviv organised by the World Federation of Hebrew Youth addressed by Revisionists and religious Zionists from Mizrachi adopts four resolutions and calls on the Chief Rabbinate and Klausner's Committee to continue the political struggle for the Western Wall.
- 14 August – In the evening, Klausner and a Mizrachi representative address several thousand people at the Yeshrun synagogue in Jerusalem after which the congregation walks to the Western Wall.
- 15 August (Tisha B'Av) – The Revisionist Zionist youth leader Jeremiah Halpern and three hundred Revisionist youths from the Battalion for the Defence of the Language and Betar march to the Western Wall proclaiming "The Wall is ours". The protesters raise the Zionist flag and sing the Hatikvah.
- 16 August – Tensions are raised in Jerusalem by a 2,000-strong Muslim counter-demonstration after Friday prayers during which youths chase Jewish worshippers from the Western Wall and burn prayer petitions and books.
- 17 August – A Jewish youth, Avraham Mizrahi, is killed during a minor dispute and an Arab youth picked at random is stabbed in retaliation.
- 23 August – 1929 Palestine riots: The 1929 Palestine riots break out following months of tension over the Western Wall, a large violent mob of Arabs, armed with knives, stormed out of the Damascus Gate and attacked the Jewish neighborhoods located outside the gate. 19 Jews are killed, a synagogue and other houses are destroyed and burned.
- 23–24 August – 1929 Palestine riots: In the 1929 Hebron massacre, Arab rioters massacre 67 Jews and wound 60 others; 435 Jews survive by virtue of the shelter and assistance offered them by their Arab neighbours, who hid them.
- 29 August – 1929 Palestine riots: In Safed 18 Jews are killed by Arabs and 80 others wounded. The main Jewish street in Safed is looted and burned.
- 26 October – The First Arab Women’s Congress is held in Jerusalem.

=== Unknown dates ===
- The founding of the agricultural settlement Pardes Hanna by the Palestine Jewish Colonization Association. The settlement is named after Hannah Rothschild, daughter of Nathan Mayer Rothschild.
- The Zionist Commission renames itself as the Palestine Zionist Executive.

== Births ==
- 11 January – Rafael Eitan, eleventh chief of staff of the IDF (died 2004).
- 11 January – David Maimon, Israeli general, Military Governor of the Gaza Strip, President of the Military Court of Appeals, and head of the Israel Prison Service (died 2010).
- 3 March – Mordechai Eliyahu, Israeli rabbi, former Sephardi Chief Rabbi of Israel (died 2010).
- 1 May – Tamar Bornstein-Lazar, Israeli children's writer (died 2020).
- 7 May – Tawfiq Ziad, Palestinian poet and politician who served as Mayor of Nazareth. (died 1994)
- 31 May – Menahem Golan, Israeli film director and producer (died 2014).
- 23 June – Simcha Dinitz, Israeli diplomat (died 2003).
- 2 July – Avraham Avigdorov, Israeli decorated war hero (died 2012).
- 10 July – Herzl Shafir, Israeli general and Commissioner General of the Israel Police (died 2021).
- 25 July – Yosef Alon, Israeli pilot, founding member of the Israeli Air Force, and diplomat (died 1973).
- 5 August – Amikam Aharoni, Israeli physicist (died 2002).
- 22 August – Amnon Carmeli, Israeli footballer (died 1993).
- 22 August – Eliezer Schweid, writer and Professor of Jewish Philosophy at Hebrew University of Jerusalem (died 2022).
- 4 September – Mohammed Milhim, Palestinian politician who served as Mayor of Halhul between 1976–2005 (died 2021).
- 29 September – Yaakov Blau, Israeli rabbi, notable dayan and posek (died 2013).
- 21 November – Nahum Admoni, Israeli intelligence officer, former director general of the Mossad.
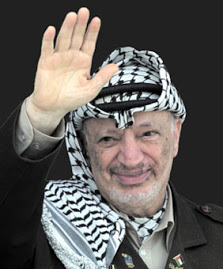
  Yasser Arafat
- 9 December – Yigal Arnon, Israeli lawyer (died 2014).
- 12 December – Zaharira Harifai, Israeli actress (died 2013).
- 14 December – Shlomo Argov, Israeli diplomat (died 2003).
- Full date unknown
  - Daniel Doron, Israeli economist and political activist (died 2022).
  - Ibrahim Dakkak, Palestinian Arab civil engineer (died 2016).
  - Yasser Arafat, Palestine leader who served as President of Palestine between1989 to 2004. (died 2004)

== Bibliography ==
- Comay, J and Cohn-Sherbok, L. (1995). Routledge Who's Who in Jewish history After the Period of the Old Testament. Routledge.ISBN 978-0-415-11887-3
- Krämer, Gudrun (2008). A History of Palestine: From the Ottoman Conquest to the Founding of the State of Israel. Princeton University Press. ISBN 978-0-691-11897-0
- Mattar, Philip (1988). The Mufti of Jerusalem: Al-Hajj Amin Al-Husayni and the Palestinian National Movement. Columbia University Press. ISBN 0-231-06463-2
- Segev, Tom (2000). One Palestine Complete: Jews and Arabs Under the British Mandate. Abacus. ISBN 978-0-349-11286-2
- Shindler, Colin (2006). The Triumph of Military Zionism: Nationalism and the Origins of the Israeli Right. I B Tauris & Co Ltd. ISBN 978-1-84511-030-7
