= 1934 in Mandatory Palestine =

- 1934 in the British Mandate of Palestine
«««
1933
1932
1931
»»»
1935
1936
1937
See also:
1934 in the United Kingdom
Other events of 1934

Events in the year 1934 in the British Mandate of Palestine.

== Incumbents ==
- High Commissioner – Sir Arthur Grenfell Wauchope
- Emir of Transjordan – Abdullah I bin al-Hussein
- Prime Minister of Transjordan – Ibrahim Hashem

== Events ==
- According to official statistics there were 42,359 Jewish immigrants during 1934.

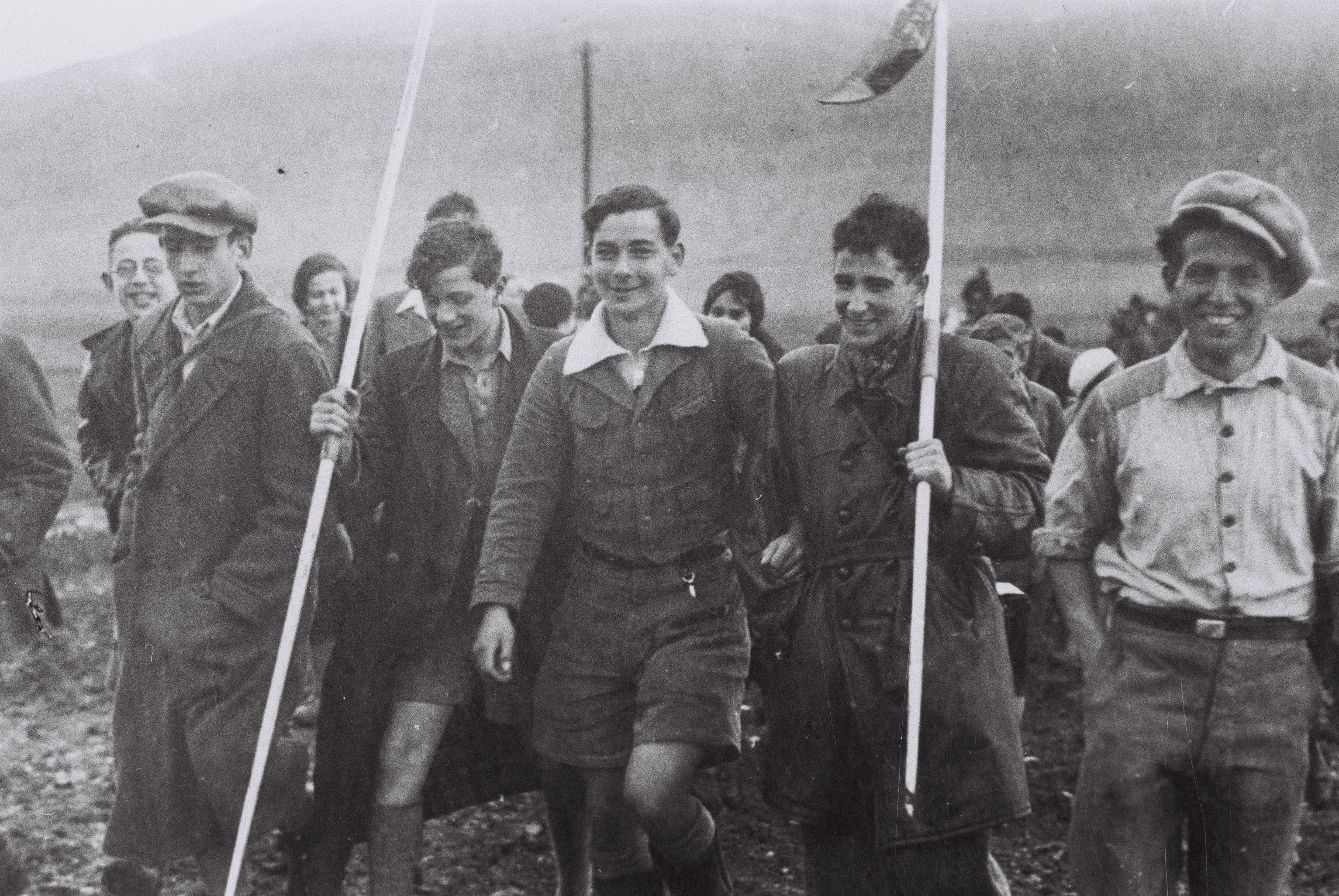
The first German Youth Aliyah group walking towards Kibbutz Ein Harod, 1934

- 19 February – The first organized group of Youth Aliyah children from Germany, organized by the Youth Aliyah Bureau, arrive in Palestine and is sent to study in Kibbutz Ein Harod.
- 14 May – Severe rainstorms in Tiberias lead to a flood in which 35 people are killed and about 100 buildings are destroyed.
- 18 July – The founding of settlement Kiryat Bialik by Jewish German immigrants of the Fifth Aliyah.
- December – National Defense Party (Mandatory Palestine) established.

=== Unknown dates ===
- The Organized illegal Jewish immigration to Palestine begins in 1934, following the deteriorating situation of the German Jews after the Nazi Party rise to power in 1933 and also as a result of the adoption of anti-Semitic policies in other European countries which included pogroms, persecutions and restrictions.
- The "Sieff Institute" is established in 1934 in Rehovot, a research institute which later becomes the Weizmann Institute of Science.

== Notable births ==
- 13 January – Avraham Ravitz, Israeli politician and member of the Knesset (died 2009).
- 15 January – Ephraim Stern, Israeli archaeologist (died 2018).
- 17 February – Adiel Amorai, Israeli politician.
- 21 February – David Avidan, Israeli poet, painter, filmmaker, publicist and playwright (died 1995).
- 25 February – Meir Har-Zion, Israeli commando (died 2014).
- 5 March – Daniel Kahneman, Israeli-American economist, Nobel Prize laureate (died 2024).
- 8 March – Yaakov Shabtai, Israeli writer (died 1981).
- 21 April – Meron Benvenisti, Israeli political scientist and deputy mayor of Jerusalem (died 2020).
- 13 May – Ehud Netzer, Israeli archaeologist (died 2010).
- 9 May – Zvi Alderoti, Israeli politician (died 2018).
- 24 June – Daoud Hanania, Jordanian heart surgeon.
- 28 June – Eitan Berglas, Israeli economist and banker, chair of Bank Hapoalim (died 1992).
- 26 July – Raaphi Persitz, Israeli chess master (died 2009).
- 22 October – David Libai, Israeli jurist and politician (died 2023).
- 9 November – Shulamit Lapid, Israeli novelist and playwright.
- 18 November – Sara Japhet, Israeli biblical scholar (died 2024).
- 7 December – Avraham Katz-Oz, Israeli politician.
- 12 December – Haim Kaufman, Israeli politician (died 1995).
- Full date unknown
  - David Ivry, Israeli general and diplomat, former commander of the Israeli Air Force.
  - Abu Ali Iyad, Palestinian Arab and senior Fatah field commander based in Syria and Jordan during the 1960s and early 1970s (died 1971).
  - Amos Lapidot, Israeli fighter pilot, former commander of the Israeli Air Force (died 2019)
  - Tsuri Sagi, Israeli general (died 2026)

== Notable deaths ==
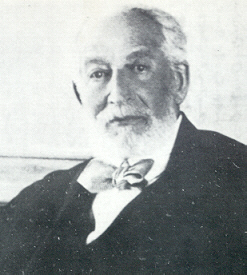
Edmond James de Rothschild

- 4 July – Hayim Nahman Bialik (born 1873), Russian-born Jewish poet and one of the pioneers of modern Hebrew poetry.
- 27 March – Musa al-Husayni (born 1853), Palestinian Arab politician and leader of the Palestinian Arab national movement from 1922 until 1934. He never recovered from the beating he received from the Palestine Police in Jaffa five months earlier.

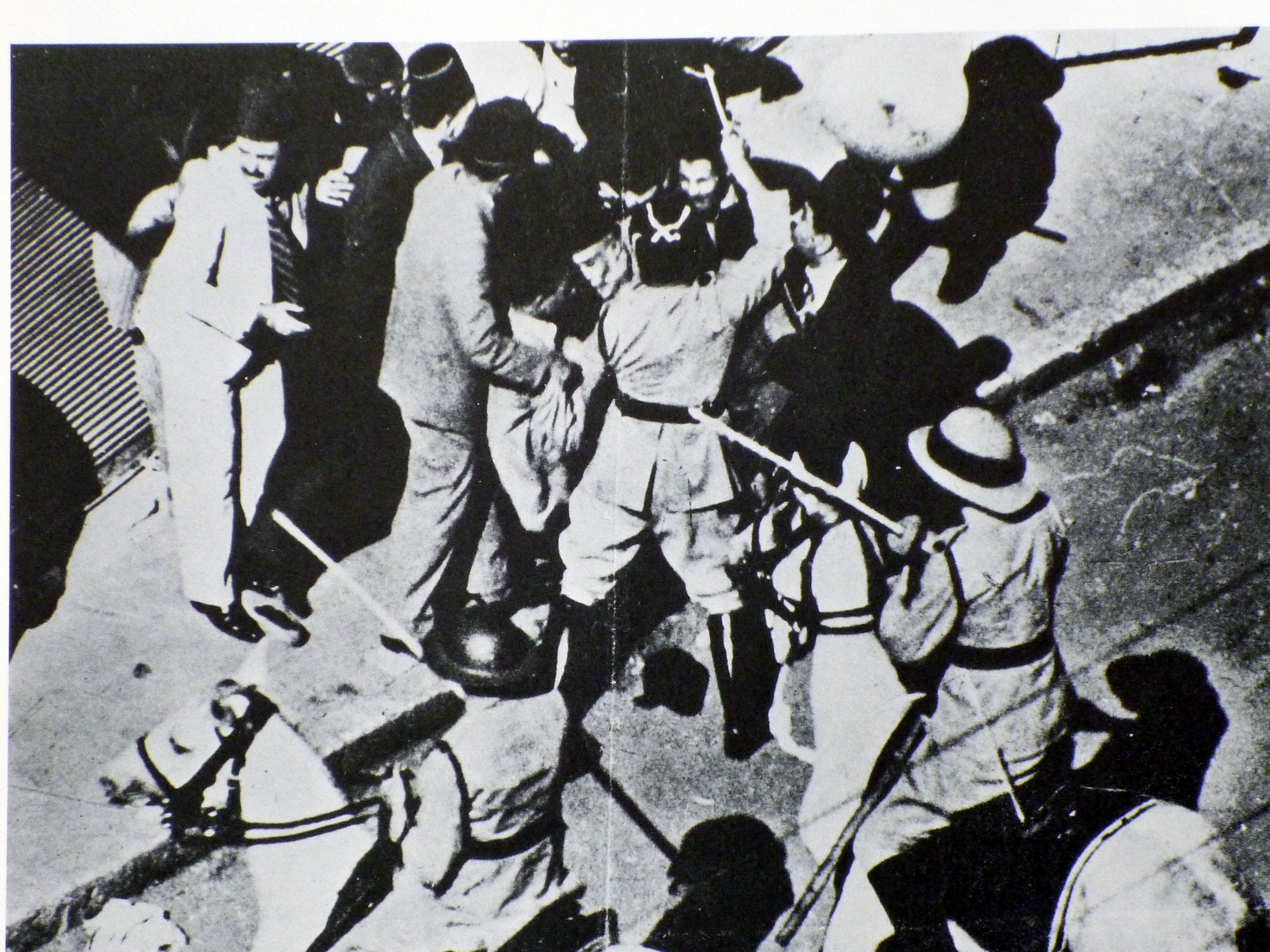
80-year-old Musa al-Husayni being clubbed by a British Policeman, Jaffa, 27 October 1933.

- 2 November – Edmond James de Rothschild (born 1845), French-born Jewish philanthropist and a major supporter of Zionism during the First Aliyah period.
