= Emanuel Hatzofe =

Israeli sculptor (1928–2019)

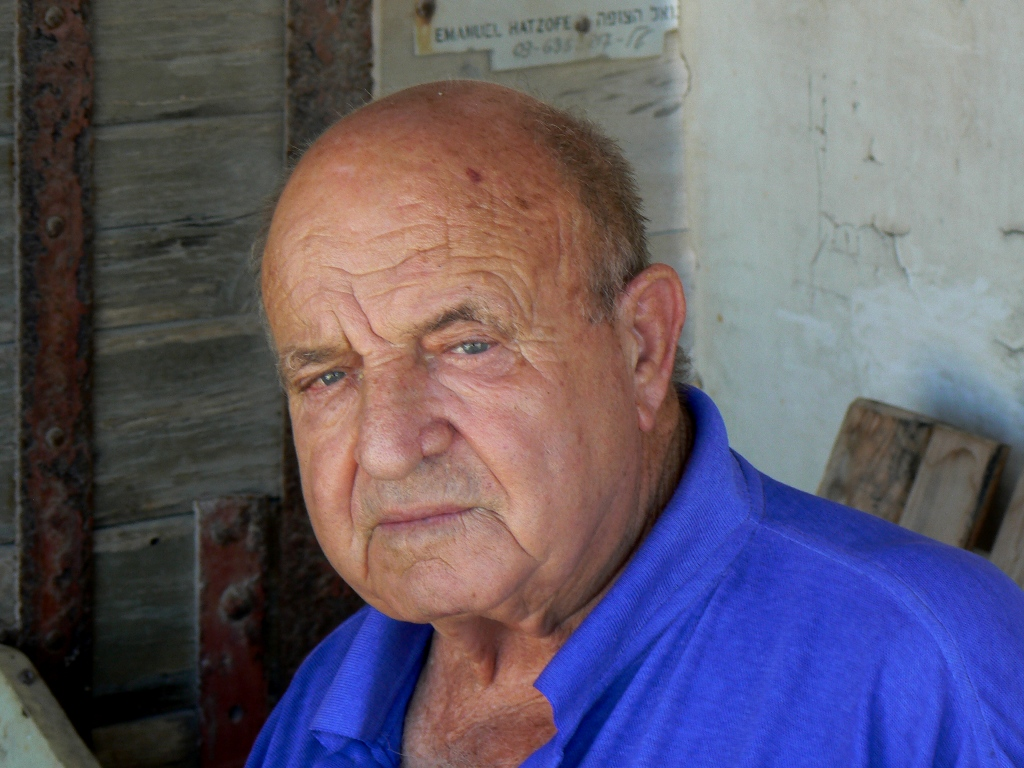

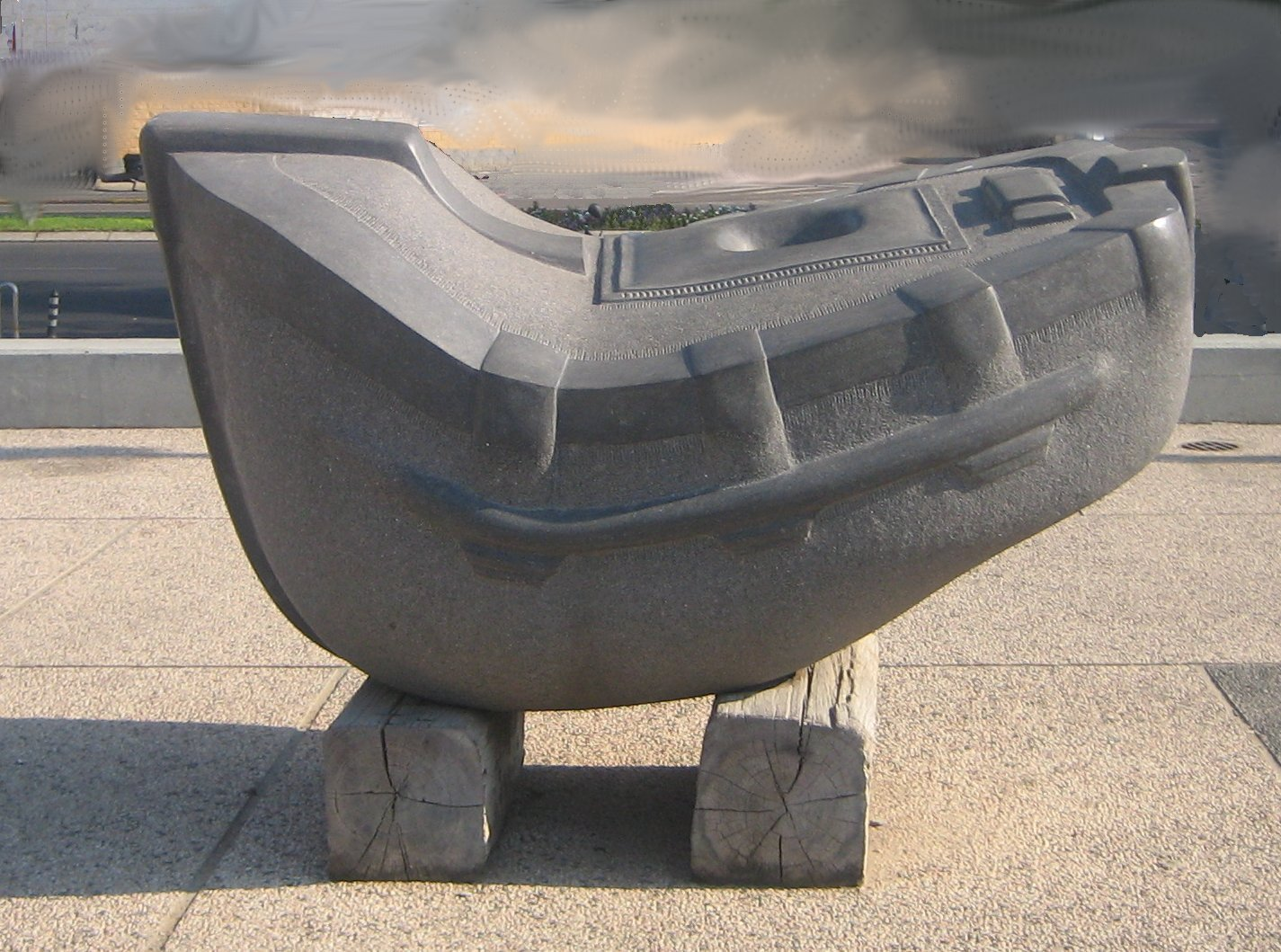
'Boat', Galilee basalt sculpture by Emanuel Hatzofe, 2003, Tel Aviv Museum of Art, Tel Aviv, Israel

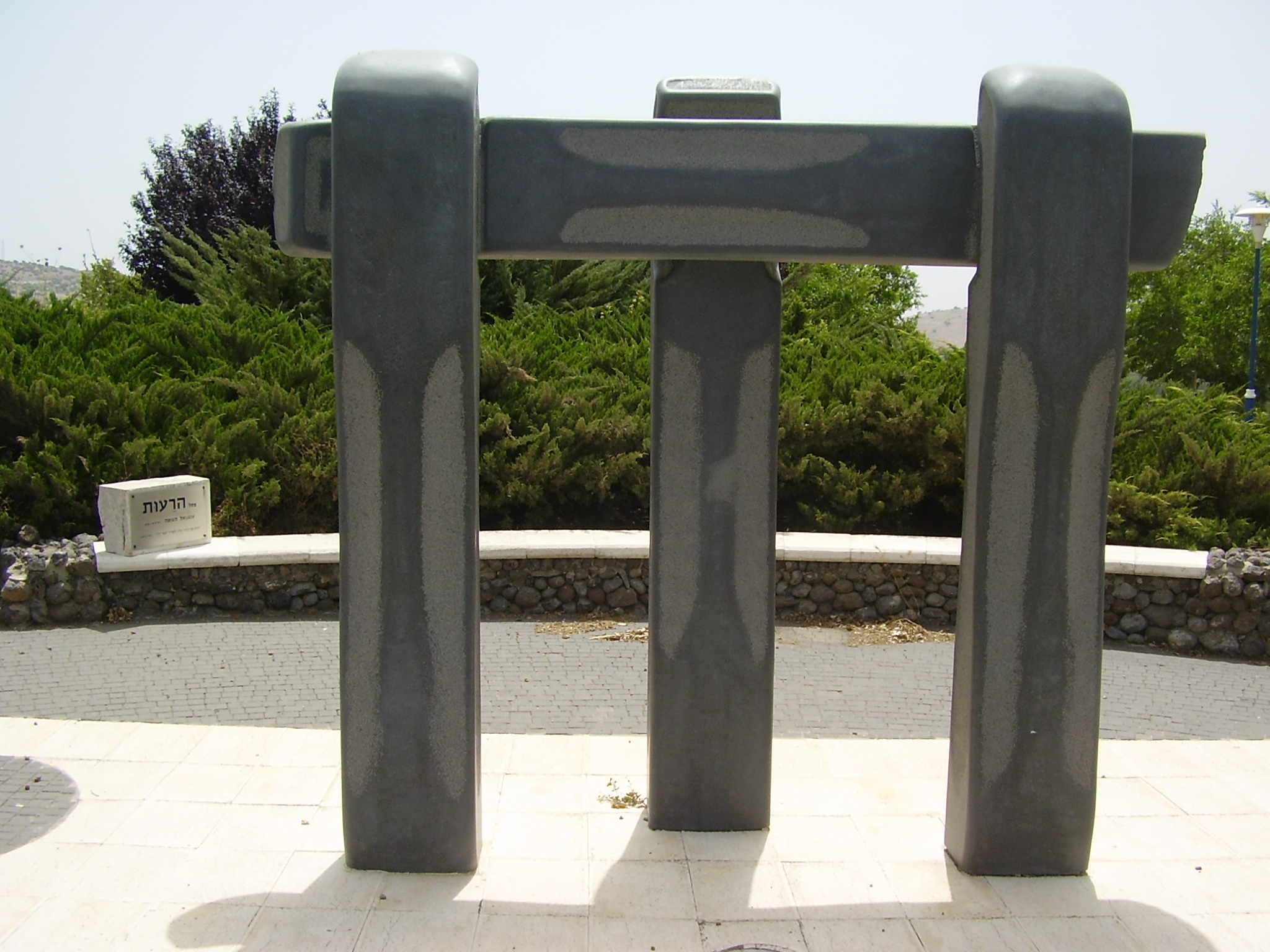
PikiWiki Israel 8942 friendship monument in kibbutz yiron

Emanuel Hatzofe (Hebrew: עמנואל הצופה; November 19, 1928 - July 19, 2019) was an Israeli sculptor.

Emanuel Hatzofe was born in Tel Aviv. Before the establishment of the State, Hatzofe joined the Palmach. He was wounded in the 1947–1949 Palestine war. He studied at the Bezalel Academy of Art and Design in Jerusalem from 1946 to 1947 and then pursued advanced studies with sculptor Zeev Ben-Zvi. He joined the Merchant Marine and became a sea captain.

Hatzofe received first prize at the 1995 Toyamura International Sculpture Biennale in Hokkaidō, Japan.

Hatzofe died on 19 July 2019, aged 90.

== Works ==
Hatzofe's public sculptures include:

- Holocaust and Heroism, 1990, Tel Aviv University
- The Throne, 1991, Tel Aviv University
- Anchor, 1993, Ra'anana, Israel
- Boat, 2003, Tel Aviv Museum of Art

== See also ==
- Visual arts in Israel
