= Black Hand (Mandatory Palestine) =

Anti-Zionist and anti-British militant group

- الكف الأسود
- Founding leader: Izz ad-Din al-Qassam †
- Dates active: 1930–1935
- Active regions: Mandatory Palestine
- Ideology: Palestinian nationalism Islamism; Anti-Zionism
- Size: 200–800 (1935)

The Black Hand (Arabic: الكف الاسود, romanized: al-Kaff al-Aswad) was an anti-Zionist and anti-British Jihadist militant organization in Mandatory Palestine.

== History ==
The organization was founded in 1930 and led, until his death in 1935, by Syrian-born Sheikh Izz ad-Din al-Qassam, (Note: Sometimes spelled Ezzedeen Al-Qassam.) whose preaching was instrumental in laying the foundations for the formation of the Black Hand, which he used to proclaim jihad and attack Jewish settlers. The idea for such a group appeared to crystallize after the 1929 riots, though one source says a decision was taken after the Day of Atonement incident at the Wailing Wall in September 1928.

From the outset a split occurred in the organization, with one militant group led by Abu Ibrahim arguing for immediate militant attacks, while the other headed by al-Qassam thought an armed revolt premature, and risked exposing the group's preparations. According to Subhi Yasin, the militant attacks in the north were executed by the dissident group in defiance of Qassam, though in 1969 Abu Ibrahim denied these allegations. The ensuing militant campaign began with the ambush and murder of three members of Kibbutz Yagur, 11 April 1931, a failed bombing attack on outlying Jewish homes in Haifa, in early 1932, and several operations that killed or wounded some four members of northern Jewish settlements. It climaxed with the deaths of a Jewish father and son in Nahalal, from a bomb thrown into their home, on 22 December 1932.

After the failure of the Hananu Revolt that he led in Syria, al-Qassam escaped to Haifa. According to Shai Lachman, between 1921 and 1935 al-Qassam often cooperated with Mufti of Jerusalem Mohammed Amin al-Husayni. They were on good terms, and al-Qassam's various official appointments required the mufti's prior consent. He suggests their cooperation increased after the 1929 riots, in which one source claims al-Qassam's men were active. The two fell out in the mid-thirties, perhaps due to al-Qassam's independent line of activism. When the Mufti rejected his plans to divert funding marked for mosque repairs for the purchase of weaponry, Qassam found support in the Arab Nationalist Istiqlal Party. Qassam continued his attempts to forge an alliance with the Mufti in order to attack the British. He was not successful for the Mufti, who headed the Supreme Muslim Council, was still committed to a diplomatic approach at the time. Qassam went ahead with his plans to attack the British on his own.

The Black Hand was preceded by a group calling itself Green Hand that existed briefly in Safad and Acre districts and which was active for a few months during the winter of 1929/1930.

Al-Qassam justified violence on religious grounds. After the 1929 Hebron massacre, he intensified his anti-Zionist and anti-British agitation and obtained a fatwa from Sheikh Badr al-Din al-Taji al-Hasani, the Mufti of Damascus, authorizing the armed resistance against the British and the Jews.

=== Operations ===
By 1935, Black Hand had several hundred men - the figures differ from 200 to 800 - organised in cells of 5 men, and arranged military training for peasants. The cells were equipped with bombs and firearms, which they used to raid Jewish settlements and sabotage British-constructed rail lines. Though striking a responsive chord among the rural poor and urban underclass, his movement deeply perturbed the Muslim urban elite as it threatened their political and patronage connections with the British Mandatory authorities.

In various acts of violence Black Hand targeted Jewish targets in northern Palestine between 1930 and 1935 and killed at least eight Jews. In one instance three members of kibbutz Yagur were killed, 11 April 1931, and in another a father and son were killed in Nahalal, 22 December 1932.

On November 20, 1935, after killing a Palestine Police officer, al-Qassam was surrounded by British police in a cave near Jenin and killed in a gunbattle along with three of his fighters. Some of the Black Hand's surviving members participated in the 1936–1939 Arab revolt in Palestine.

== Legacy ==
Although al-Qassam's revolt was unsuccessful in his lifetime, many organizations gained inspiration from his revolutionary example. He became a popular hero and an inspiration to later Arab militants, who in the 1936–39 Arab revolt, called themselves Qassamiyun, followers of al-Qassam.

Black Hand was the name used by members of the 'Azazme Negev Bedouin who were believed to be responsible for the killing of eleven Israelis at Scorpion Pass, 17 March 1954.

Another account describes another group using the Black Hand name which was active around Jaffa in 1919. According to this account it was founded by Wadi'al Bustani and was believed to have the support of the British military governor of Jaffa.

The Izz ad-Din al-Qassam Brigades is the military wing of the Palestinian nationalist Islamist political organisation Hamas created in 1992. From 1994 to 2000, the Izz ad-Din al-Qassam Brigades carried out a number of attacks against both Israeli soldiers and civilians.

Qassam rockets are also named after al-Qassam.

== See also ==
- 1936–1939 Arab revolt in Palestine
- Abd al-Qadir al-Husayni
- Cement Incident
- Jihad
- Black Hand (Serbia)
