= Ruth Horam =

Israeli painter and sculptor (1931–2021)

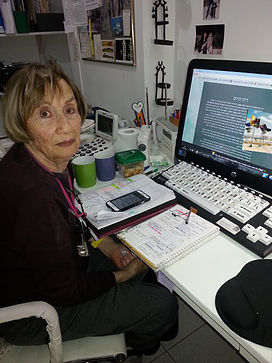
Horam in 2016

Ruth Horam (Hebrew: רות הורם; 2 – 1931 August 2021) was an Israeli painter and sculptor.

== Biography ==
Ruth Horam was born in 1931 in Tel Aviv, Mandatory Palestine. She was a graduate of the Rehavia Gymnasium in Jerusalem and of Saint Martin's School of Art in London. In 1960, she won the UNESCO Prize for Painting, in Paris. She was married to Yehuda Horam, who served as Israeli ambassador to Switzerland. Between 1964 and 1967, she chaired the Jerusalem Association of Painters and Sculptors. In 1969 she travelled to Seoul, South Korea where she studied the art of calligraphy, returning to Israel in 1973. In 1983, she was Guest-Artist at 'Arabia' Ceramics in Finland. In 1996 she received the MASTO Foundation grant for Creativity. Horam was a resident of Jerusalem until her death on 2 August 2021.

== Art career ==
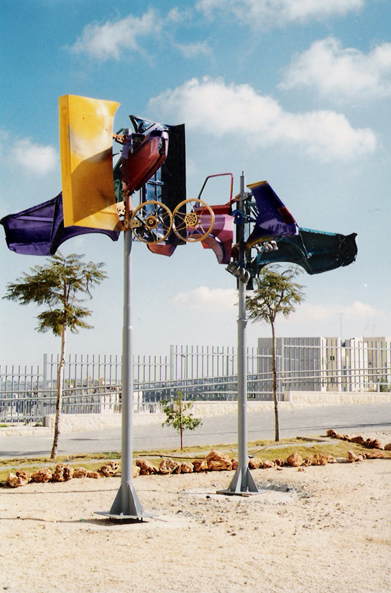
Ruth Horam sculpture

Since 1993, Horam had worked at the Jerusalem Printing Workshop. Her monotype prints were developed from multi-layered freely printed meshes. In the process she interposed various materials such as paper cuttings, leaves, twigs, scraps of fabric, and photos of nature or urban landscapes. Her works were conceived and done in groups following a theme, each print being a unique creation.

Horam produced environmental sculptures in Jerusalem and other parts of the country. Some of her work was carried out in collaboration with sculptor Magdalena Hefetz. Horam's focal point was ecology and recycling, using such materials as old car parts.

== See also ==
- Visual arts in Israel
