= Yoel Alroy =

Israeli footballer and politician (1930–2023)

- יואל אלרואי

10th Mayor of Netanya
- In office 8 December 1983 – 1 November 1993
- Preceded by: Reuven Kliger
- Succeeded by: Zvi Poleg

Leader of the Opposition in the Netanya City Council
- In office 1974–1983

Personal details
- Born: Yoel Spiegel; 1930 Petah Tikva, Mandatory Palestine
- Died: 21 September 2023 (aged 93)
- Party: Likud
- Education: Hebrew University of Jerusalem (M.L.)
- Profession: Athlete; lawyer

Military service
- Allegiance: Israel
- Branch/service: Artillery Corps
- Years of service: 1948–1954
Association football career
- Position: Forward
Youth career
- –1947: Maccabi Netanya
Senior career*
Years	Team	Apps	(Gls)
1947–1960	Maccabi Netanya	95	(17)
Total		95	(17)
- * Club domestic league appearances and goals

Yoel Alroy (Hebrew: יואל אלרואי; 1930 – 21 September 2023) was an Israeli footballer and politician. He played as a forward for Maccabi Netanya and after his retirement from football served as the mayor of Netanya from 1983 to 1993.

== Early life ==
Yoel Alroy was born in 1930 in Petah Tikva, but moved to Netanya at the age of three weeks where his parents ran an orchard, which was destroyed during the 1936–1939 Arab revolt in Palestine, leaving Yoel's family nearly bankrupt. He studied in the Biyalik school, where he concluded his studies in 1947. While in high school, Alroy served in the Haganah, and joined the Maccabi Netanya, beginning his career in sports.

== Legal practice and sports career ==
In the late 1940s and early 1950s, Yoel studied in the Hebrew University of Jerusalem, earning a degree in law in 1954. He subsequently opened a small law firm in Netanya, and married Pnina, his wife. As a lawyer, Yoel participated in the Kastner trial. He also remained within the IDF, and fought in the Suez Crisis, the Six-Day War, and the War of Attrition. He remained in the Maccabi Netanya during this time, and continued to play sports.

== Political career ==
Yoel entered local politics in 1973, joining the Herut party, and being placed second on its slate for the Netanya City Council. He was elected in 1974, but his party failed to win the mayoral election, leading to the resignation of fellow city council member and leader of the opposition, Oved Ben-Ami. As a result, Alroy became leader of the opposition, and served in the position from 1974 to 1983.

In 1984, he made his intentions to retire from political life clear, but was pressured by his supporters into making a run for Mayor of Netanya. He won the subsequent general election and became the city's 10th Mayor.

Shortly after Alroy took office, several new schools were opened, and existing ones were renovated. The municipal education system initiated extracurricular activities, increased assistance in education for the disadvantaged and directed resources to unique projects in education, such as assisting in the absorption of thousands of immigrants from Russia and Ethiopia settling in Netanya, nurturing gifted children and assisting community centers and youth in distress. More than a third of the city's budget was directed towards education during this period. In addition, Alroy made efforts to reform the city's bureaucracy, merging departments and replacing department leaders with people he saw as more qualified and competent.

During his first term as mayor of Netanya there was a wave of development: he was responsible for the new boardwalk on the beach as well as renovating Herzl street and the Tel-Hai pedestrian street. He assisted in the construction of the privately owned Sharon Mall, and efforts were made to introduce new gardens and playgrounds, while renovating the city's sidewalks.

Alroy won re-election in 1989, and continued the trend of bureaucratic reform and expansion of local infrastructure, but lost re-election in 1993 to the Likud's candidate. He ran again in 1998, this time as an independent, but was not elected.

Alroy later served as chairman of the Association for the Elderly in Netanya, also known as Hadar.

== Death ==
Yoel Alroy died on 21 September 2023, at the age of 93.

== Honours ==
Maccabi Netanya

- Netanya Cup: 1953
- Israel State Cup runner-up: 1954
