= Didi Menosi =

Israeli writer and satirist (1928–2013)

- דידי מנוסי
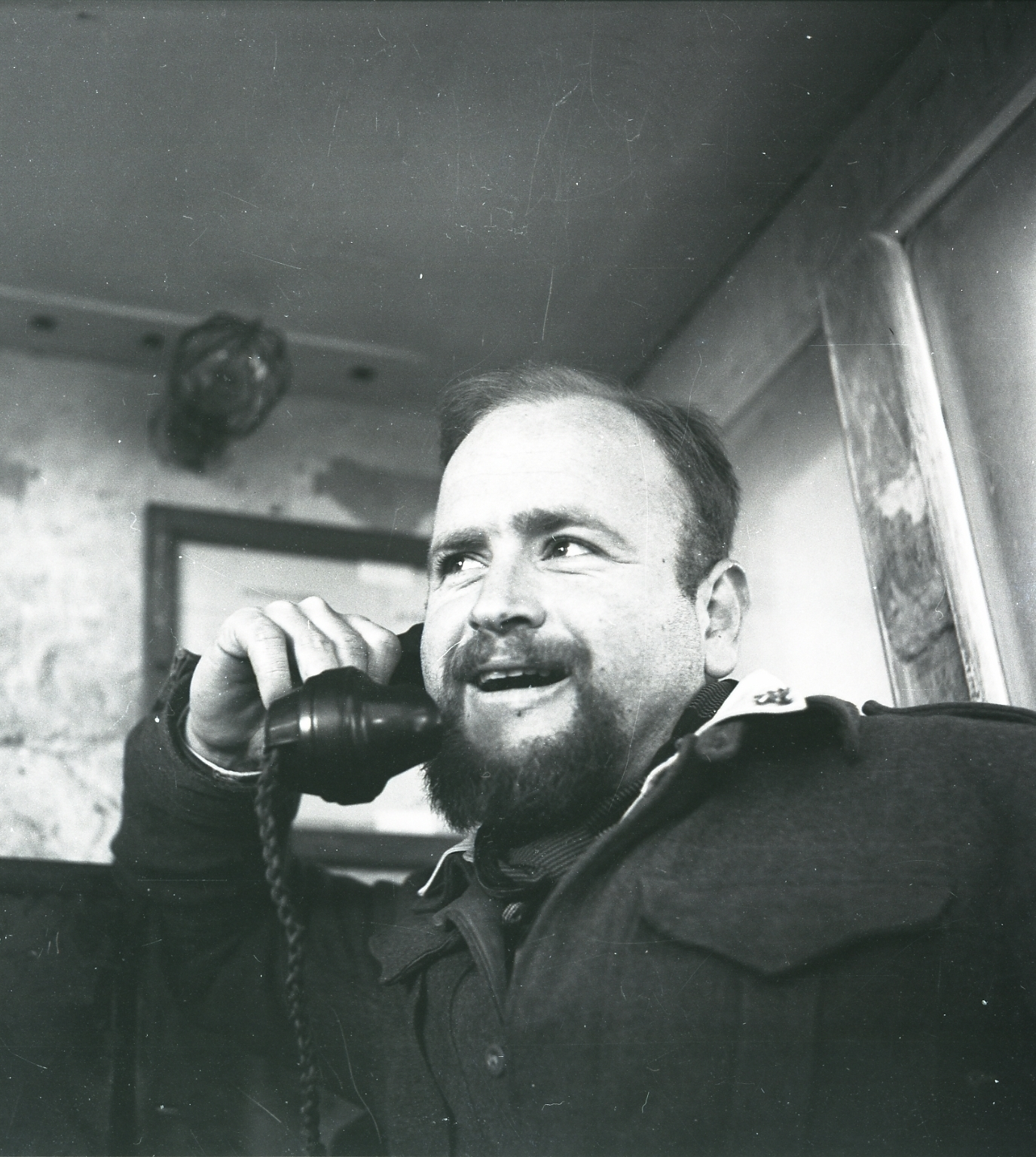
- Menosi in 1961
- Born: 9 May 1928; Geva, Mandatory Palestine
- Died: 20 December 2013 (aged 85); Ramat Gan, Israel
- Other name: Didi Menussi
- Education: Hebrew University of Jerusalem
- Occupations: Poet; lyricist; dramatist; columnist; satirist
- Years active: 1962–2000
- Spouse: Tzila Menosi (m. 1959)
- Children: 3

Didi Menosi (Hebrew: דידי מנוסי; 9 May 1928 – 20 December 2013) was an Israeli poet, lyricist, dramatist, columnist and satirist.

== Biography ==
Menosi was born on Kibbutz Geva in the Jezreel Valley, at the time Mandatory Palestine. He studied literature at the Hebrew University of Jerusalem. From 1962 to 2000, his rhyming satirical column dealing with current events was published each week in the mass-circulation newspaper Yedioth Ahronoth.

In 2006, he was diagnosed with Parkinson's disease. Didi Menosi died on the morning of 20 December 2013, aged 85, at his home in Ramat Gan, Tel Aviv District, Israel. He was survived by his wife of 54 years, Tzila Menosi, and three children.
