= Yaëla Hertz =

Israeli-Canadian teacher and violinist (1930–2014)

- יעלה הרץ
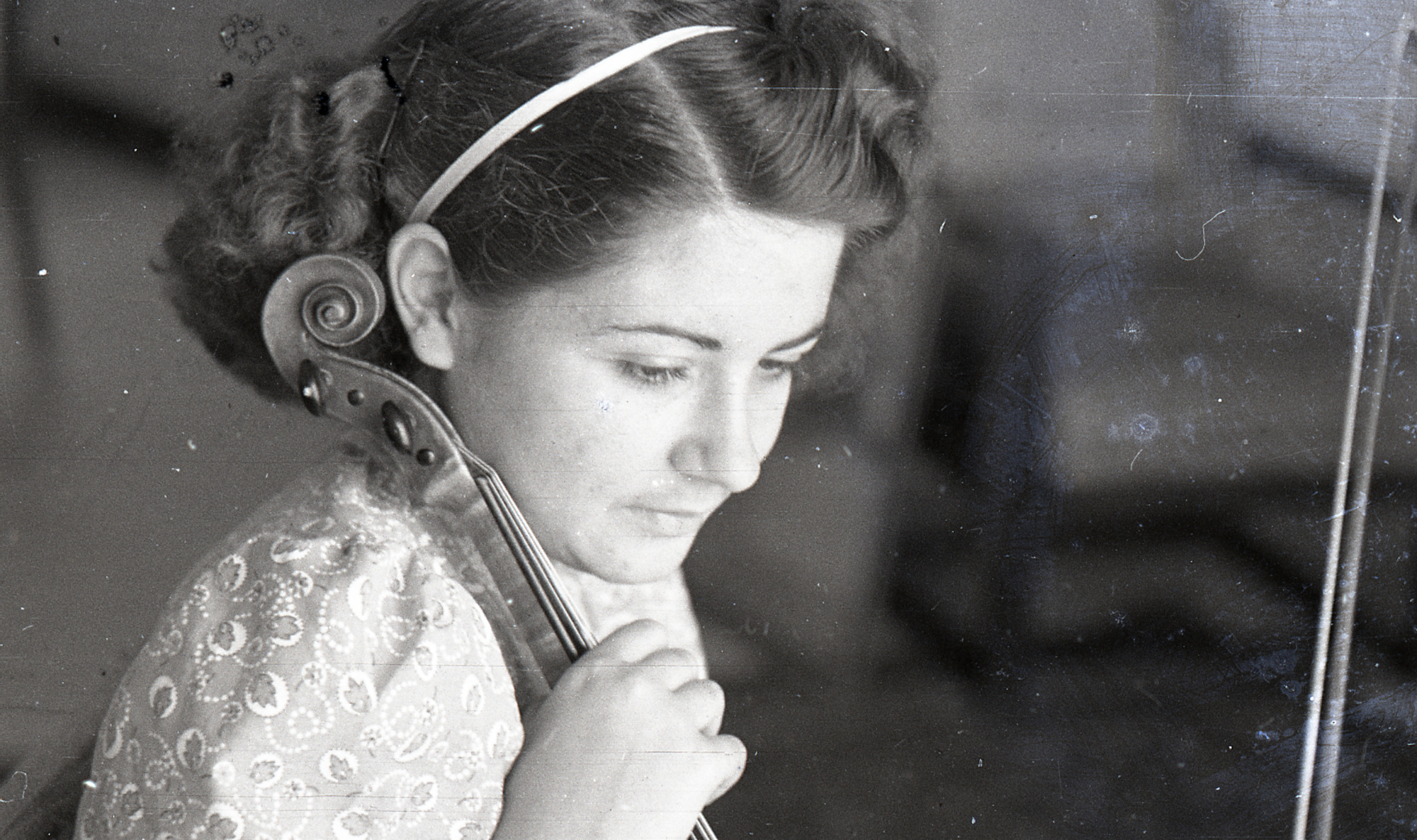
- Hertz in 1947
- Born: April 1930; Tel Aviv, Mandatory Palestine (now Israel)
- Died: 30 May 2014 (aged 84); Montreal, Quebec, Canada
- Education: Juilliard School
- Occupations: Teacher; violinist
- Spouse: Nathan Berkson (died)
- Children: 3

Yaëla Hertz Berkson (Hebrew: יעלה הרץ; April 1930 – May 30, 2014) was an Israeli-Canadian teacher and violinist, who was concertmaster of the McGill Chamber Orchestra from 1959 to 2000 and performed with her brother Talmon and pianist Dale Bartlett in the Hertz Trio. She toured the globe throughout her career, recorded the works of various composers, and taught master classes in chamber music and violin all round the world. Hertz also performed in recital as a soloist on radio and television and guided and mentored violinists in KlezKanada.

== Early life and education ==
In April 1930, Hertz was born in Tel Aviv, Mandatory Palestine (now Israel), to a musical family. She was the daughter of Palestine Opera concertmaster Atara Glickson-Hertz, her daughter's first violin teacher, and her father was a concert singer, who ended his career to support the growing family. Hertz grew up listening to most forms of trio music. She had a brother, Talmon, and was Jewish. Hertz later studied with Ödön Pártos, and she also attended high school. She took part in a violin competition in Vienna at age 16 where she was one of the top winners and in an international contest in Prague when she was 19; she wore an Israeli uniform in the latter competition after obtaining leave to enter it. Hertz served in the Israel Defense Force during the 1947–1949 Palestine war, and played the violin for the troops. She won the Prague competition, and subsequently moved from Israel to North America in 1950, competing for a scholarship at New York's Juilliard School, which she won. Hertz studied with NBC Symphony Orchestra concertmaster Mischa Mischakoff and later under Arturo Toscanini for a period of three years.

== Career ==
Hertz met Alexander Brott through Mischakoff and was invited by Brott to be a soloist with the Sherbrooke Symphony Orchestra. She played Ludwig van Beethoven's Violin Concerto at that concert. In 1954, Hertz moved to Montreal, and became concertmaster of the McGill Chamber Orchestra five years later. She disputed suggestions she was the first woman concertmaster in a North American ensemble. With the orchestra, she was a soloist, occasionally performed all-French music programs, and performed at the Montreal Museum of Fine Arts in early 1965. At the invitation of conductor Zubin Mehta, she toured Russia with the Montreal Symphony Orchestra in 1962. Three years later, Hertz returned to Russia to tour with the McGill Chamber Orchestra in a cultural exchange program. She also performed in Asia, Europe and South America. In 1967, Hertz recorded Concerto in F by Joseph Haydn with harpsichordist Kenneth Gilbert and some of William Boyce's and Chevalier de Saint-Georges' works with violinist Morry Kernerman in 1973. The preceding year, she joined David Oistrakh in playing double concertos by Johann Sebastian Bach and Antonio Vivaldi at the Salle Claude-Champagne.

She premiered the violin and orchestra concerto Cupid's Quandary written for her by Brott in 1976. In the same year, Hertz, her brother Talmon and pianist Dale Bartlett formed the Hertz Trio, performing in Europe, Israel, North America and Soviet Union. Their Canadian performances include two concerts at the University of Ottawa in 1978, the White Rock Playhouse with sponsorship from the local arts council and arts centre in April 1979, and the SUB Theatre in Edmonton forming part of the Edmonton Chamber Music Society series in December 1987. She and the rest of the Hertz Trio members recorded works by Anton Arensky and Bedřich Smetana on cassette in 1987 and works by Arensky, Alexis Contant, Johann Nepomuk Hummel, Fritz Kreisler and Edmund Rubbra on CD in 1988. In September 2000, Hertz announced her retirement from the post of concertmaster of the McGill Chamber Orchestra and accepted an emeritus title. She was replaced by Université du Québec à Montréal violin professor Martin Foster.

From 1967 to 1988, she taught master classes in chamber music and violin all round the world, working with programs such as Musicians of Tomorrow, the intensive music program established by Anna Sosnovsky and Maxim Vengerov and taught in Northern Israel. Hertz taught at the Cons de Hull, the Conservatoire de musique du Québec à Montréal, the École de musique Vincent-d'Indy, the McGill University and the National Youth Orchestra of Canada. On CBC Radio and television, she also performed in recital as a soloist, and guided and mentored violinists in KlezKanada.

== Personal life ==
Hertz was married to Montreal surgeon Nathan Berkson with whom she had three children. Her husband predeceased her in 1992. Hertz died at the Jewish General Hospital in Montreal, Quebec, on May 30, 2014. She was buried on the afternoon of June 1, 2014, in the Back River Memorial Gardens Cemetery.

== Legacy ==
Barbara Smith, the National Youth Orchestra's executive director, described Hertz "not only a phenomenal violinist, she was an incredible educator and mentor to many" and adding "The impact she had on her students was profound and reached beyond just technical and musical influences." A flutist said of Hertz, "To see a strong, confident woman like Yaela fill the traditionally male position of concertmaster was something extraordinary. She played so beautifully and obviously held the respect of the orchestra."
