= Cement Incident =

The Cement Incident took place in the port of Jaffa in Palestine on 16 October 1935. While Arab dockers were unloading a consignment of 537 drums of White-Star cement from the Belgian cargo ship Leopold II, which were destined for a Jewish merchant called J. Katan in Tel Aviv, one drum accidentally broke open spilling out guns and ammunition. Further investigation by British Mandate officials revealed a large cache of smuggled weapons, comprising 25 machine guns (Lewis guns), 800 rifles and 400,000 rounds of ammunition contained in 359 of the 537 drums, but because the merchant was not identified and the final destination was not uncovered, no arrests were made.

Almost overnight, protests erupted throughout Palestine and swept other major Arab urban cities, including Amman, Cairo, Damascus and Baghdad. Alongside other insurgents in Palestine, Izz ad-Din al-Qassam carried out incursions against British Mandate forces and Jewish settlers.

== Background ==
It was no secret that the Haganah had been smuggling arms into the country ever since the riots in 1929, and the discovery of the shipment gave credence to the claim that the Jews of Palestine were arming on a large-scale for an eventual confrontation to take control of Palestine. Since 1929, the Haganah had sent representatives to Belgium, France and Italy to purchase weapons, which were often smuggled into Palestine in crates and luggage. The perception that the Zionist movement was on the road to attaining the military capacity to establish its state led to a sharp sense of danger.

== Reaction ==
General alarm in the Arab press over the arms discovery and the failure of the British authorities to take action was followed by a general strike on 26 October, which was widely observed and became violent in Jaffa.

At the end of October, in response to the storm of public controversy over the arms shipment, Sheikh Izz ad-Din al-Qassam, a reformist preacher, leader of the Black Hand, an anti-Zionist and anti-British militant organisation, approached his followers with a proposal to take up arms. He recruited and arranged military training for peasants and by 1935 he had enlisted between 200 and 800 men. The cells were equipped with bombs and firearms, which they used to kill Jewish residents in the area, as well as engaging in a campaign of vandalism of settler-planted trees and British-constructed rail-lines.

In November 1935, two of Qassam's men engaged in a firefight with a Palestine police patrol hunting fruit thieves, and a policeman was killed. After the incident, British police launched a manhunt and surrounded Qassam in a cave near Ya'bad. In the ensuing battle, Qassam was killed.

Qassam's funeral in Haifa became a major nationalist demonstration attended by thousands, and he was subsequently regarded as a nationalist cult hero and became an inspiration to diverse Palestinian nationalist groups, not least during the ensuing Great Revolt of 1936–1939, which his death helped to spark six months later.

== Sources ==
- Gelber, Sylvia (1989). No Balm in Gilead: A personal retrospective of mandate days in Palestine. McGill-Queen's Press. ISBN 978-0-88629-104-4
- Kedourie, Elie (1982). Zionism and Arabism in Palestine and Israel. Routledge. ISBN 978-0-7146-3169-1
- Khalidi, Rashid (1998). Palestinian Identity: The Construction of Modern National Consciousness. Columbia University Press. ISBN 978-0-231-10515-6
- Krämer, Gudrun (2008). A History of Palestine: From the Ottoman Conquest to the Founding of the State of Israel. Princeton University Press. ISBN 978-0-691-11897-0
- Matthews, Weldon C. (2006). Confronting an Empire, Constructing a Nation: Arab nationalists and popular politics in mandate Palestine. I B Tauris. ISBN 978-1-84511-173-1
- Morris, Benny (1999). Righteous Victims: A History of the Zionist-Arab Conflict, 1881-1999. John Murray. ISBN 0-7195-6222-8
- Swedenburg, Ted. (2003). Memories of Revolt: The 1936-1939 Rebellion and the Palestinian National Past. Fayetteville: University of Arkansas Press. ISBN 978-1-55728-763-2
