= Gavriel Cohen =

Israeli politician (1928–2021)

- גבריאל כהן
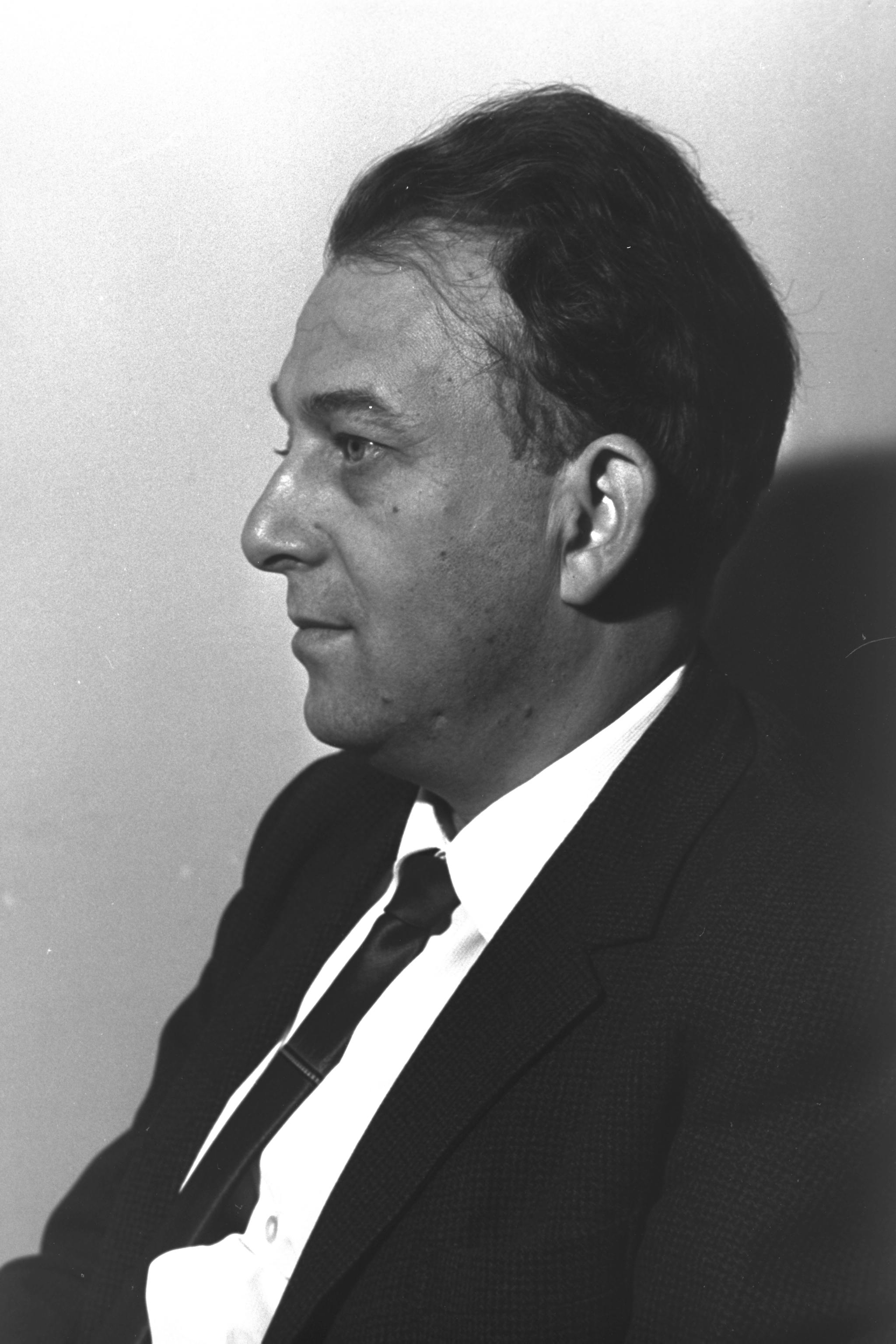
- Cohen in 1966

Faction represented in the Knesset
- 1965-1968: Alignment
- 1968-1969: Labor Party
- 1969: Alignment

Personal details
- Born: 30 May 1928; Jerusalem, Mandatory Palestine
- Died: 9 April 2021 (aged 92)

Gavriel Cohen (Hebrew: גבריאל כהן; 30 May 1928 – 9 April 2021) was an Israeli academic and politician who served as a member of the Knesset for the Alignment and Labor Party between 1965 and 1969.

== Biography ==
Born in Jerusalem during the Mandate era, Cohen joined the Palmach in 1948 and fought in the Arab-Israeli War in that year. He later studied at the Hebrew University of Jerusalem and the University of Oxford.

In 1953 he joined Ahdut HaAvoda, and in 1965 was elected to the Knesset on the Alignment list (an alliance of Ahdut HaAvoda and Mapai). He lost his seat in the 1969 elections.

Outside politics he lectured on medieval and modern history at Tel Aviv University, where he became a professor in 1976. Between 1983 and 1986 he served as dean of the Humanities Faculty at the university, before becoming a member of the Council for Higher Education.
