= Amnon Kapeliouk =

Israeli journalist and author (1930–2009)

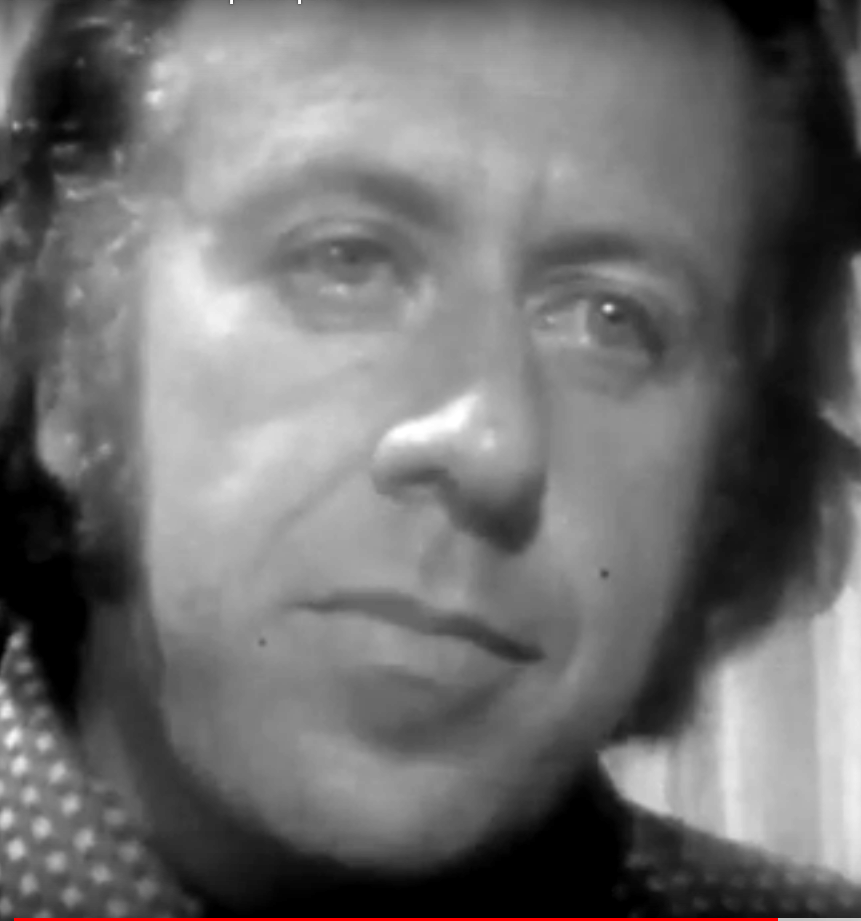
Amnon Kapeliouk

Amnon Kapeliouk (Hebrew: אמנון קפליוק; 22 December 1930 – 26 June 2009) was an Israeli journalist and author. He was a co-founder of B'Tselem and was known for his close ties to Yasser Arafat.

== Biography ==
Amnon Kapeliouk was born in Jerusalem. His father, Menachem, was a renowned Arabic scholar. Kapeliouk studied at the Hebrew University of Jerusalem. He held a PhD degree in Oriental Studies from Sorbonne University. His doctorate was on Israel's Christian Arab community. He began writing for the Israeli daily Al HaMishmar in the 1950s. He was married to Olga, with whom he had had two daughters.

Kapeliouk died on 26 June 2009 at the age of 78. At the time of his death he was a resident of Jerusalem.

== Journalism career ==
Kapeliouk wrote for several newspapers, among them Al HaMishmar, Yedioth Ahronoth, Le Monde and Le Monde Diplomatique. He covered news from the Arab world as well as the activities of Palestinians in Israel and the territories. In 1988, he was sent to Moscow to cover the Gorbachev years and the collapse of the Soviet Union. He served on the editorial board of New Outlook, a magazine dedicated to Israeli-Arab dialogue.

During the First Lebanon War, Kapeliouk interviewed Arafat in Beirut. When Al HaMishmar refused to publish it, he quit the paper and moved to Yediot Ahronoth. The introduction to his 2004 biography of Arafat, Arafat l'Irréductible, was written by Nelson Mandela.

== Published works ==
- Israel: La fin des mythes (Albin Michel, Paris, 1975)
- La fin des mythes, Sabra et Chatila: Enquête sur un massacre (Seuil, Paris, 1982)
- Rabin: anatomie d'un assassinat politique - Religion, nationalisme, violence en Israël (Le Monde, Paris, 1996)
- Arafat l’irréductible (Fayard, Paris, 2004)
- Hébron, un massacre annoncé (Seuil, Paris, 1994)
- Not by Omission: The Case of the 1973 Arab–Israeli War, translated by Mark Marshall, introduction by Noam Chomsky and Irene Gendzier (Verso, London and New York, 2022)
