= The Green Hand Gang =

The Green Hand Gang was an anti-Zionist and anti-British armed group that existed between October 1929 and mid-1930 in the Safed and Acre districts of northern Palestine during the British Mandate period.

The group was formed in October 1929 following a number of attacks on Jewish communities during the 1929 Palestine riots of August 1929. Its founder, Ahmed Tafish, was a Druze from Safed. The group's first operation was against the Jewish quarter of Safed in cooperation with local supporters in the town. In the following month the group was augmented by the arrival of several Druze fighters, including Fuad el Libnani, who had taken part in the 1925 Great Syrian Revolt against the French. In November, following a second attack on Jews in Safed the British authorities sent Palestine Police reinforcements to the area. The group then moved its activities to Acre district where they attacked police patrols. In December British army troops were sent into the area. The authorities were assisted by the French regime in Syria who increased their patrols on the Syria-Palestine border. During the first two months of 1930, the British succeeded in capturing sixteen of Green Hand members and breaking up the gang. During the summer of 1930, Ahmed Tafish was arrested in Transjordan.
