= Samira Abu Ghazaleh =

Palestinian poet, scholar, and political activist (1928–2017)

- سميرة أبو غزالة
- Born: 1928; Nablus, West Bank
- Died: Age 89, on 2017 January 12; Cairo, Egypt
- Citizenship: Palestine
- Education: Female Teachers' Training College in Jerusalem, 1947 BA Education and Psychology, American University of Beirut (AUB), 1952-1955 expelled for protesting BA in Arabic Literature, Cairo University,1956 MA in Arabic Literature, Cairo University, 1962
- Occupation(s): Supreme Council for Arts and Literature in Cairo (now the Supreme Council for Culture) Taught Arabic to foreigners at the American University in Cairo.
- Employer(s): Jordanian Red Crescent in Jerusalem,1950 Teachers Training College in Ramallah–al-Bireh, 1957–1958
- Organization(s): Young Arab Women's Association, 1950 Palestinian Women's League, Cairo, 1963 Popular Mobilization Department of the Palestine Liberation Organization (PLO), 1963 General Union of Palestinian Women (GUPW), Jerusalem, 1965 Palestine National Council, 1965
- Notable work: Mudhakkarat fatat ʿarabiyya [Memoirs of an Arab Girl], 1962
- Movement: Egyptian Red Crescent
- Spouse: Gamal Salim
- Children: Mona
- Father: Mohammad Zaki Abu Ghazaleh
- Relatives: One sister, Nadeera, and two brothers
- Call sign: Radio Palestine Fatat Filastin [Girls of Palestine], Cairo

Samira Abu Ghazaleh (1928–12 January 2017) was a Palestinian poet, scholar, professor, political activist, and soldier advocating for the liberation and statehood of Palestine.

== Early life ==
Born in Nablus in 1928, she completed her primary and secondary schooling in Ramla. She later graduated from the Female Teachers' Training College in Jerusalem in 1947.

== Education ==
She attended the American University of Beirut (AUB) in 1952 working on a bachelor's in education and psychology, but was expelled in 1955 because of her political protests against the Baghdad Pact. She later attended Cairo University and graduated with her bachelor's in Arab Literature in 1952.

Fearing arrest, she returned to Cairo University and finished her MA in Arabic LIterature in 1962. Her thesis was titled "Nationalist Poetry in Egypt and the Levant between the First and Second World Wars".

== Employment ==
While on the run during the Nakba, Abu Ghazaleh and her family returned to Nablus and the sisters all taught children in the neighborhood out of their uncle's house to support the family. She worked as a secretary for the Jordanian Red Crescent in Jerusalem in 1950 but stopped in 1952 when she got a scholarship to study at the American University in Beirut (AUB).

After attaining her MA, she worked at the Supreme Council for Arts and Literature in Cairo [now Supreme Council for Culture] teaching Arabic to foreigners at American University in Cairo.

== Political activism ==
While at the Female Teachers' Training College, she and some of her cohort protested the British forces and Zionist groups by leaving class and throwing stones at the buses going from Jerusalem to Jaffa. In 1948 she volunteered to gather supplies to help support the Palestinian fighters and advocated youths to learn how to fight. She volunteered at the Egyptian Red Crescent based in Ramla in 1948.

While in Beirut studying for her BA, Abu Ghazzaleh was outspoken at meetings of the Arab Nationalist Movement, al-Urwa al-Wuthqa [the Unbreakable Bond], and her fellow AUB female students interacting with US Marines who were 'visiting' Lebanon's beaches.

In 1955, she protested against the Baghdad Pact, was expelled from AUB, and went into hiding for ten days and later returned to Nablus. At home, she worked to advocate for women to participate in the protests and she participated in rallies for political and voting rights during that time.

In 1963, she tried to establish the Palestinian Women's League in Cairo and joined the Popular Mobilization Department of the Palestine Liberation Organization (PLO) and the General Union of Palestinian Women (GUPW) in 1964. From 1965 to 1985 she remained a member of the Palestine National Council and was elected to the PLO Central Council in 1985.

As a part of her work with the PLO she founded the House for Palestinian Female Students in Cairo and helped open several Palestinian home projects that employed women and families.

She hosted the Fatat Filastin [Girls of Palestine] radio program on Radio Palestine and had a weekly column in al-Difaaʿ [Defense] newspaper in Jerusalem.

== Publications ==
- Abu Ghazaleh, Samira (1962) مذكرات فتاة عربية". القاهرة، [Memoirs of an Arab Girl]
- Abu Ghazaleh, Samira (1965) دراسات في الشعر القومي". القاهرة، [Studies on Nationalist Poetry]
- Abu Ghazaleh, Samira (1989) نداء الأرض"، شعر. القاهرة، [Call of the Land]
