= Uri Aviram =

Israeli professor of Social Work

- אוּרִי אֲבִירָם
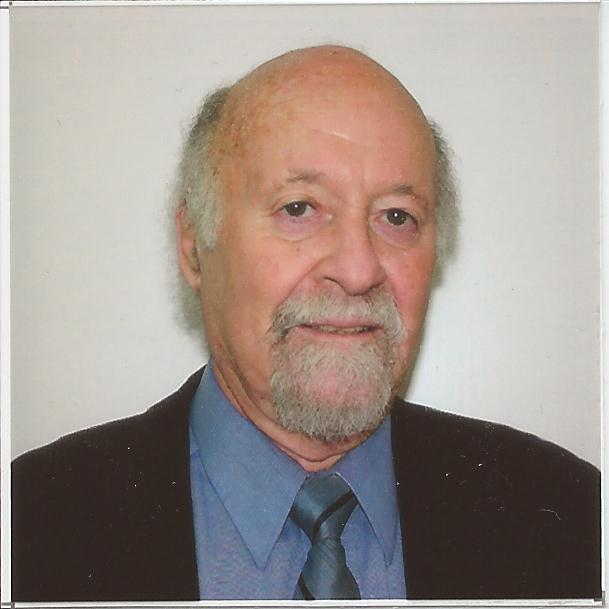
- Born: March 19 1936
- Education: Hebrew University of Jerusalem

Uri Aviram (Hebrew: אורי אבירם; born March 19, 1936, in Haifa) is Zena Harman Professor Emeritus of Social Work at the Hebrew University of Jerusalem. In January 2016 he was appointed as the Dean of the School of social and community Sciences at Ruppin Academic Center in Israel. He retired in 2017, continuing research on mental health policy and services.

== Academic work ==
Aviram earned a bachelor’s degree in history and education from Hebrew University in 1962 and a MSW from Wayne State University in 1966.

After getting his Ph.D. at the University of California, Berkeley in 1972, the focus of his academic work was mental health services research, policy studies and social work education. More recently he has conducted research on mental health reforms, the interface between psychiatry and law, and social work education. He has published in Israeli, American, and European journals.

== Social work program ==
He designed and established the social work program at Ruppin Academic Center in Israel and was the chairperson of the program during 2014-2015. Between 2007 and 2011 Prof. Aviram served as the chairperson of Israel National Council for the Rehabilitation in the Community of Persons with Psychiatric Disabilities.

During the 1990s he headed the School of Social Work at the Hebrew University of Jerusalem. Prior to that, he was a professor at the Institute for Health Policy, and the School of Social Work, Rutgers University, N.J. From 1972 to 1987 he was on the faculty of Tel-Aviv University School of Social Work, where he established and directed the Community Mental Health Program, and also headed the School.

== Visiting appointments ==
Prof. Aviram had visiting appointments at several academic institutions including - Case Western Reserve, Berkeley, Cornell, U. of Melbourne, and Sydney. During the 1990s He served on the committee preparing the legislation for the Israel Act for Equal Rights for Persons with Disabilities.

In 2015, Prof. Aviram was awarded by ESPAnet-Israel for lifelong contribution to the study of social policy in Israel.

He has been serving (voluntarily) on several national Israelil research committees including the Israel National Institute for Health Policy and on the health and welfare teams of the Taub Center for Social Policy Studies in Israel. ( February, 2017 )
