= Abdallah Siraj =

Arab politician and Islamic scholar

Abdullah Siraj
- عبد الله سراج
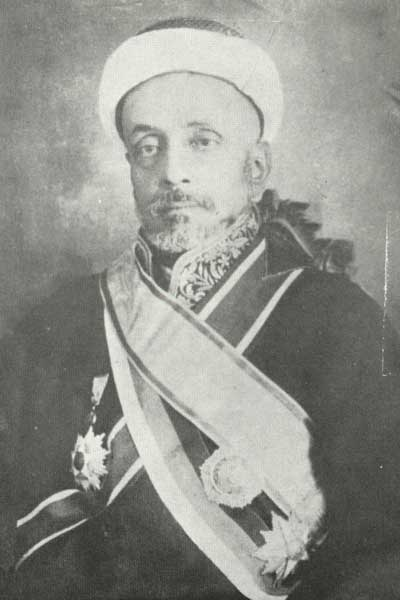

5th Prime Minister of Transjordan
- In office 22 February 1931 – 18 October 1933
- Monarch: Abd Allah I
- Preceded by: Hasan Khalid Abu al-Huda
- Succeeded by: Ibrahim Hashem

Prime Minister of Hejaz
- In office October 1924 – November 1925
- Monarch: Ali
- Preceded by: Ali
- Succeeded by: Muhammad at-Tawil

Deputy Prime Minister of Hejaz
- In office October 1916 – October 1924
- Monarch: Husayn
- Prime Minister: Ali

Hanafi Mufti of Mecca
- In office c. 8 November 1907 – October 1924
- Appointed by: Ali Abd Allah Pasha
- Preceded by: Abd Allah ibn Abbas

Personal details
- Born: c. 1876 or c. 1879 Mecca, Hejaz Vilayet, Ottoman Empire
- Died: c. May 1949 Kingdom of Jordan
- Education: Madrasah as-Sawlatiyah al-Azhar University

Abdullah ibn Abdur-Rahman Siraj (Arabic: عبد الله بن عبد الرحمن سراج; 1876 – May 1949) was a Hejazi-born Jordanian politician and Islamic scholar who held various posts in the Kingdom of Hejaz and later the Emirate of Transjordan, including the office of Prime Minister of both countries (including being the 5th Prime Minister of Jordan).

Born in Mecca, he graduated from Madrasah as-Sawlatiyah and later al-Azhar University in Cairo. In 1907 he was appointed Mufti of the Hanafis in Mecca by Sharif Ali Abd Allah. He was elected to represent Mecca in the Ottoman parliament in 1908, though he resigned before he ever served. After Sharif Husayn declared independence from the Ottoman Empire in 1916, he appointed Siraj as Chief Justice and Deputy Prime Minister of the Hejaz government.

Siraj served as acting Prime Minister in lieu of Emir Ali until 1918. After Husayn abdicated the throne in 1924, Siraj held the office of Prime Minister during most of Ali's short reign, which ended with the Kingdom's surrender to the Saudi Sultanate of Nejd in 1925. He then migrated to the Jordan, where under Emir Abd Allah he served as Prime Minister from 1931 to 1933 while simultaneously holding the portfolios of Finance and the Interior Ministry, as well as the office of Chief Justice.
