= 1924 in Mandatory Palestine =

- 1924 in the British Mandate of Palestine
«««
1923
1922
1921
»»»
1925
1926
1927
See also:
1924 in the United Kingdom
Other events of 1924

The following lists events that happened during 1924 in the British Mandate of Palestine.

== Incumbents ==
- High Commissioner – Sir Herbert Louis Samuel
- Emir of Transjordan – Abdullah I bin al-Hussein
- Prime Minister of Transjordan – Hasan Khalid Abu al-Huda until 3 March; 'Ali Rida Basha al-Rikabi

=== April ===
- 24 April – The football team "Hapoel Haifa" is established, the first football team to belong to the "Hapoel" sport association.

=== June ===
- 30 June Jacob Israël de Haan assassinated in Jerusalem by Haganah

=== October ===
- 17 October – The HaNoar HaOved ("The Working Youth") movement is founded by Palestinian Jewish youth working to defend their rights. The name of the movement was changed in 1959 to "HaNoar HaOved VeHaLomed" ("The Working and Studying Youth").

=== December ===
- 13 December – The founding of Herzliya, initially a semi-cooperative farming community (moshava), near the central Mediterranean coast of the country.

=== Unknown dates ===
- Collective Responsibility Ordenance issued giving powers of collective punishment in rural areas. Introduced to combat feuding between communities. The powers included application of fines and demolition of houses.
- The founding of the moshav Magdiel, one of the four original communities of Jewish agriculturalists that combined in 1964 to form Hod Hasharon.
- The founding of the agricultural settlement Bnei Brak by Rabbi Yitzchok Gerstenkorn and a group of Polish chasidim.
- Birzeit University is established as a girls' school.

== Births ==
- 11 January – Yehuda Perah, Israeli politician (died 1998).
- 24 January – Rabbi Hayim David HaLevi, Chief Rabbi of Tel Aviv (died 1998).
- 24 February – Ted Arison, Israeli-American businessman (died 1999).
- 29 March – Amnon Linn, Israeli politician (died 2016).
- 5 May - Siman-Tov Ganeh, Israeli war hero, recipient of the Hero of Israel medal (died 1968).
- 15 June – Ezer Weizman, Israeli Air Force commander and seventh President of Israel (died 2005).
- 30 June - Amos Horev, Israeli general and President of the Technion – Israel Institute of Technology.
- 31 July - Ben Zion Abba Shaul, Israeli Sephardic rabbi, Torah scholar, and Rosh Yeshiva (died 1998).
- 31 July – Abraham Yakin, Israeli artist (died 2020)
- 21 August – Pesah Grupper, Israeli politician (died 2013).
- 13 September – Israel Tal, Israeli general (died 2010).
- 15 September – Mordechai Tzipori, Israeli military officer and politician (died 2017).
- 9 November – Avraham Tamir, Israeli general and statesman (died 2010).
- 25 November – Zundel Kroizer, Israeli rabbi (2014).
- 17 December – Yohai Ben-Nun, sixth commander of the Israeli Navy (died 1994).
- 9 December - Nahman Raz, Israeli politician (died 2015).
- 25 December – Yosef Avni, Irgun fighter (died 2021).
- Full date unknown
  - Shmuel Ben-Dror, Israeli footballer (died 2009).
  - Uzi Feinerman, Israeli politician (died 1975).
  - Yehoshua Ben-Zion, Israeli banker (died 2004).
  - Raquela Prywes, Israeli nurse (died 1985).
  - Kamal Nasser, Palestinian writer and political leader(assasinated1973).

== Deaths ==
- 10 January - Haim Moshe Elyashar (born 1845), Sephardic Chief Rabbi of the Land of Israel.
- 11 May - Yehoshua Yellin (born 1843), Jewish communal leader and land developer.
- 30 June - Jacob Israël de Haan (born 1881), writer, poet, journalist, and political activist, victim of prominent assassination.
- 8 August - Sarah Lishansky (born 1884), nurse and founder of the first Clalit Health Services clinic.
- 19 October - Moshe Shmuel Glasner (born 1856), Talmudic scholar and Jewish communal leader.

Full date unknown

- Faidi al-Alami (born 1865), Mayor of Jerusalem.
