= 2009 in Israel =

- Decades: 1980s; 1990s; 2000s; 2010s; 2020s
- See also: History of Israel; Timeline of Israeli history; List of years in Israel

Events in the year 2009 in Israel.

== Incumbents ==
- President of Israel – Shimon Peres
- Prime Minister of Israel – Ehud Olmert (Kadima) until March 31, Benjamin Netanyahu
- President of the Supreme Court – Dorit Beinisch
- Chief of General Staff – Gabi Ashkenazi
- Government of Israel – 31st Government of Israel until March 31, 32nd Government of Israel

== Events ==
- January – the Tamar gas field was discovered in the Mediterranean Sea off the coast of Israel.
- February 10 – The Elections for the 18th Knesset are held in Israel. The Likud party wins 27 seats and Kadima 28; however, the right-wing camp wins a majority of seats, and President Shimon Peres called on Benjamin Netanyahu to form the government.
- March 19 – Former Israeli president Moshe Katsav is formally indicted in a Tel Aviv court for rape and other sexual offences against three women who had worked with him.
- March 31 – Benjamin Netanyahu presents his cabinet for a Knesset "Vote of Confidence". The 32nd Government is approved that day by a majority of 69 to 45 and the members are sworn in.
- April 4 – Tel Aviv's official centennial celebrations open at the Rabin Square.
- May 11–15 – Pope Benedict XVI visits Israel and the Palestinian territories. During his visit, the pope condemned Holocaust denials and called for cooperation between the Palestinians and Israelis.
- 16 May – Noa and Mira Awad represent Israel at the Eurovision Song Contest with the Hebrew, Arabic and English language song "There Must Be Another Way".
- June 8 – Former Finance Minister Avraham Hirschson is convicted of embezzling millions of shekels from the National Workers Labor Federation during the period in which he served as its chairman.
- June 24 – Former Finance Minister Avraham Hirschson is sentenced to five years and five months of jail and a fine of 450,000 shekels.
- June 25 – During the 2009 NBA draft, the Israeli basketball player Omri Casspi is selected 23rd overall by the Sacramento Kings. making him the first Israeli to be selected in the first round of the NBA draft. With his debut with the Kings on October 28, 2009, Casspi becomes the first Israeli to play in the NBA league.
- 13–23 July – The 18th Maccabiah Games are held with 7,510 athletes from Israel and Jewish communities throughout the world competing in 33 sports.
- August 1 – Two killed and at least fifteen are injured in a shooting at the "Bar-Noar" LGBT center in Tel Aviv.
- August 20 – Leading Israeli TV personality Dudu Topaz commits suicide in the Nitzan Detention Center in Ramla, by hanging himself in his prison cell, while awaited trial on charges of assaulting top media Israeli media executives.
- August 30 – Ehud Olmert is indicted on three counts of corruption, becoming the first ex-Prime Minister of Israel to face criminal charges.
- September 1 – Former Finance Minister Avraham Hirschson arrives at the Hermon prison facility to begin serving his five-year sentence.
- September 13 – An Israeli Air Force F-16A crashes while on a training flight over the southern Hebron hills, killing pilot Captain Assaf Ramon. Assaf was the son of Ilan Ramon, a former F-16 pilot and Israel's first astronaut, who was killed in the Space Shuttle Columbia disaster.
- September 24 – In an address to the United Nations General Assembly in New York, Netanyahu said Iran poses a threat to the peace of the world and that it is incumbent on the world body to prevent it from obtaining nuclear weapons.
- September 25 – The trial of former Israeli Prime Minister Ehud Olmert on corruption charges begins in Jerusalem. He is the first ever Israeli Prime Minister to be brought to trial.
- November 4 – Operation Four Species: Israeli navy commandos of Shayetet 13 board and seize the MV Francop cargo ship in the eastern Mediterranean Sea and its cargo of hundreds of tons of weapons allegedly bound from the Islamic Republic of Iran for Hezbollah in Lebanon.
- November 14 – More than 1,000 ultra-Orthodox Jews demonstrate outside the offices of U.S. firm Intel in Israel in protest at work taking place at the site on Jewish Sabbath.
- December 10 – Ada Yonath received the Nobel Prize in Chemistry along with Venkatraman Ramakrishnan and Thomas A. Steitz for her studies on the structure and function of the ribosome, becoming the first Israeli woman to win the Nobel Prize out of nine Israeli Nobel laureates, the first woman from the Middle East to win a Nobel prize in the sciences, and the first woman in 45 years to win the Nobel Prize for Chemistry.
- December 12 – The Israeli government passes a highly controversial bill calling for the creation of a biometric database of all Israeli citizens, which would contain their fingerprints and facial contours.
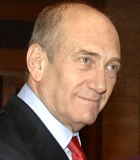
On August 30 Ehud Olmert was indicted on three counts of corruption, becoming the first ex-Prime Minister of Israel to face criminal charges.

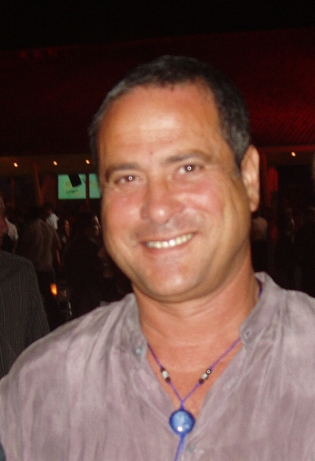
Leading Israeli TV personality Dudu Topaz commits suicide in prison while awaited trial over assaulting top Israeli media executives.

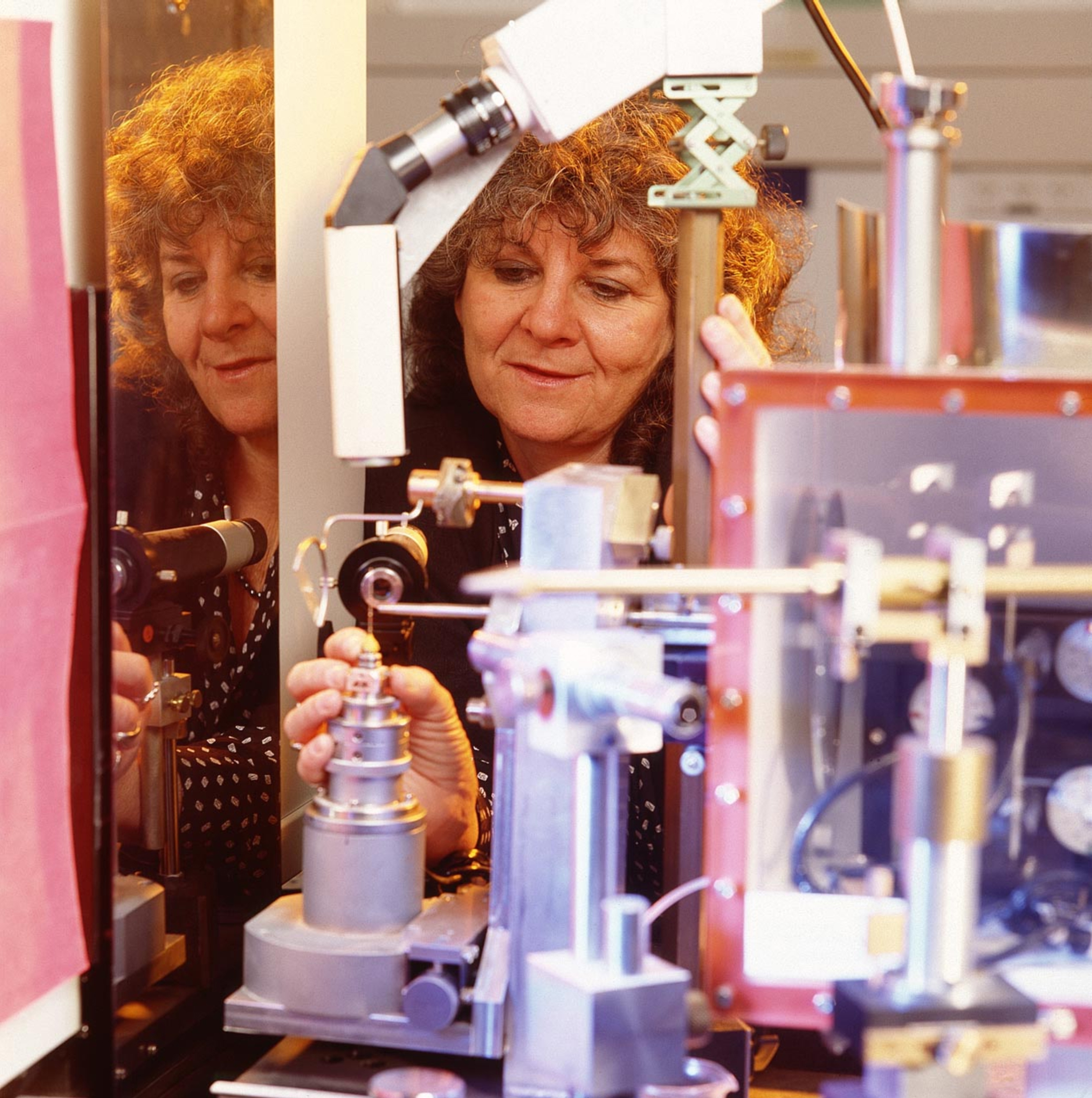
Ada Yonath is awarded the 2009 Nobel Prize in Chemistry

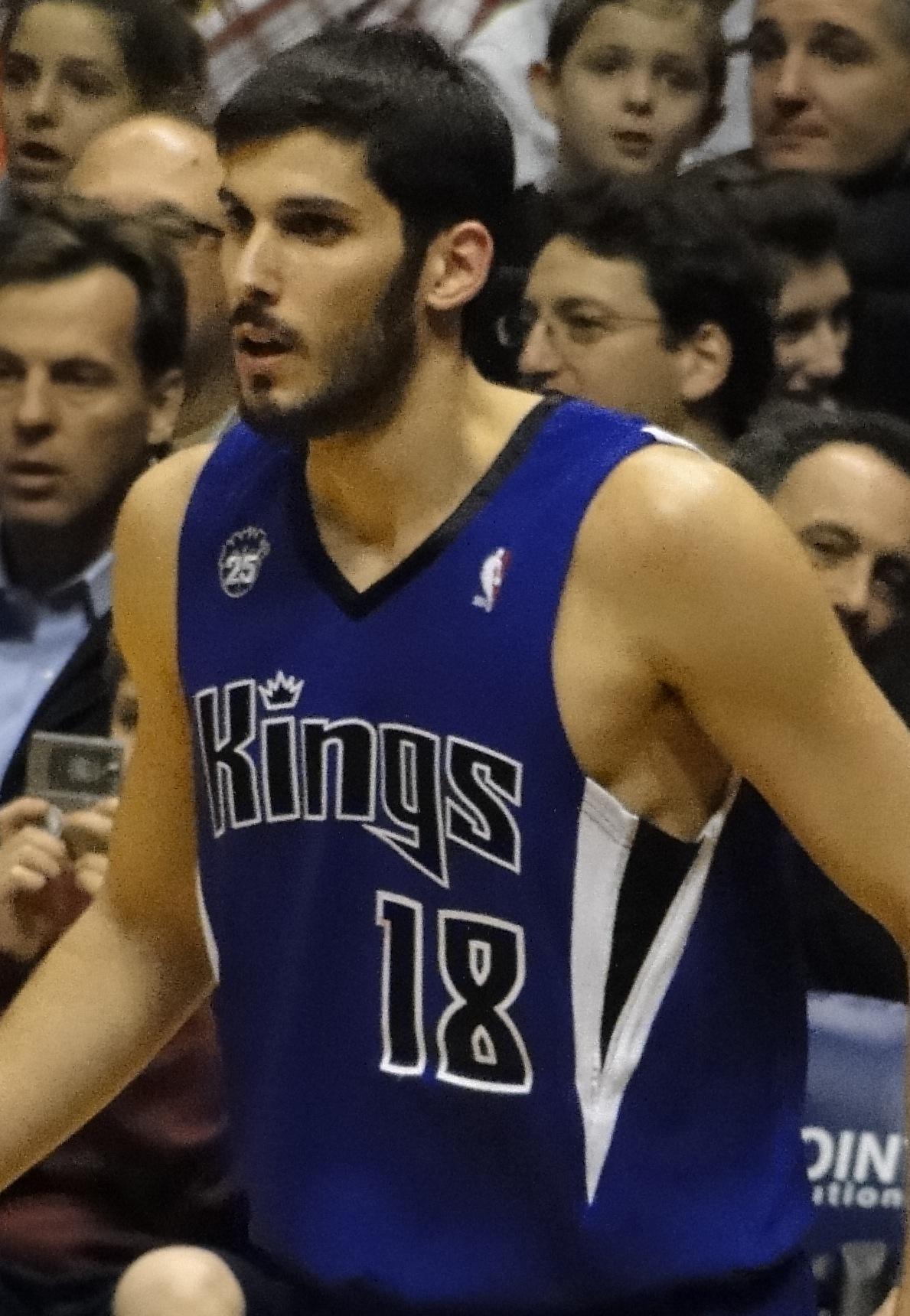
Omri Casspi becomes the first Israeli to play in the NBA league.

=== Israeli–Palestinian conflict ===
The most prominent events related to the Israeli–Palestinian conflict which occurred during 2009 include:

- May 19 – Netanyahu meets US President Barack Obama at the White House, where they discuss the Israeli–Palestinian conflict and Israel's settlements in the West Bank. While Obama says that a two state solution is a priority, Netanyahu refuses to support the creation of a Palestinian Arab state. Netanyahu says Israel has the right to continue settlements, whereas Obama calls for settlement growth to be frozen.
- June 14 – Ten days after President Obama's Cairo speech, Netanyahu gives a speech at Bar-Ilan University in which he endorsed, for the first time, a "Demilitarized Palestinian State", after two months of refusing to commit to anything other than a self-ruling autonomy when coming into office. The speech is widely seen as a response to Obama's speech.
- October 2 – Israel releases twenty female Palestinian Arab prisoners to the Gaza Strip and in exchange the Hamas releasing a videotape that proves that the Israeli captured soldier Gilad Shalit is still alive.
- October 2 – The first video of the Israeli captured soldier Gilad Shalit is released to the public.
- November 25 – Prime Minister Netanyahu announces a ten-month settlement moratorium in permits for new settlement homes in the West Bank (excluding east Jerusalem), seen as a result of pressure from the Obama administration, which urged the sides to seize the opportunity to resume talks. In his announcement, Netanyahu calls the move "a painful step that will encourage the peace process" and urges the Palestinian Arabs to respond.

Notable Israeli military operations against Palestinian militancy targets

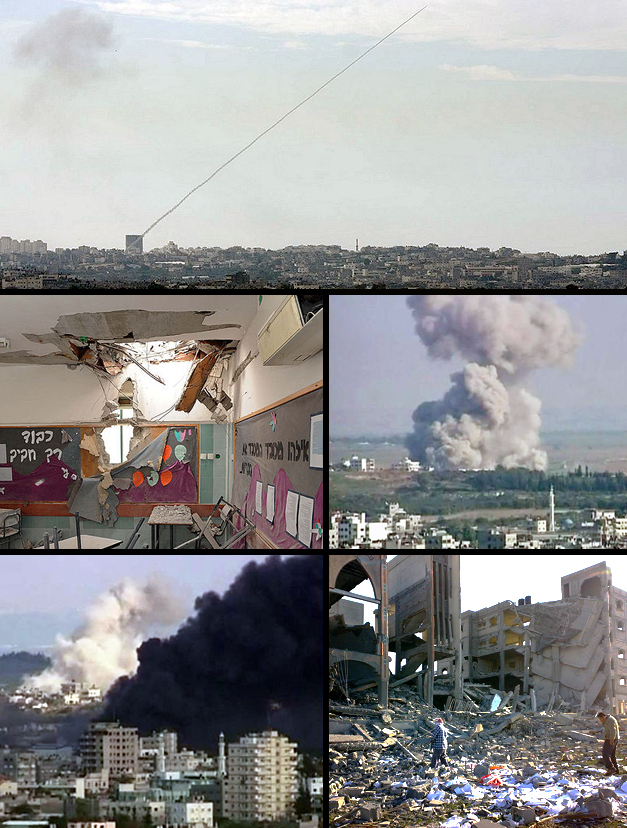
2008–2009 Israel–Gaza conflict. From top to bottom right: A Qassam rocket fired from a civilian area in Gaza towards Israel, Grad rocket fired from Gaza hits a kindergarten classroom in the southern Israeli city of Beer Sheva, An Israeli attack in the Gaza strip, Aftermath of an Israeli bombing.

The most prominent Israeli military counter-terrorism operations (military campaigns and military operations) carried out against Palestinian militants during 2009 include:

- January and February – Sudan Air Strikes: a series of two air strikes in Sudan and one in the Red Sea took place, allegedly conducted by the Israeli Air Force against Iranian arms being smuggled to the Gaza Strip through Sudan. The Israeli government hinted that Israeli forces were involved in the incident.
- Operation Cast Lead
  - January 1 – Israeli airstrike on the Gaza Strip city of Jabalia kills senior Hamas military commander Nizar Rayan and six members of his family.
  - January 3 – Israel launches a ground invasion of the Gaza Strip as the Gaza War enters its second week.
  - January 17 – Israel announces a unilateral ceasefire in the Gaza War. It comes into effect the following day, on which Hamas declares a ceasefire of its own.
  - January 21— Israel completes its withdrawal from the Gaza Strip. Intermittent air strikes by both sides of the preceding war continue in the weeks to follow.

Notable Palestinian militant operations against Israeli targets

The most prominent Palestinian militant acts and operations committed against Israeli targets during 2009 include:

- January 27 – Palestinian Arab militants detonate a bomb at the Kissufim crossing, killing one Israeli soldier and wounding three others.
- March 5 – A Palestinian Arab resident of east Jerusalem attacks an Israeli police car and a bus on the Menachem Begin Expressway in Jerusalem using a bulldozer, injuring two police officers before being shot to death.
- April 2 – Bat Ayin axe attack: A Palestinian Arab man armed with a pickax rampages in the Jewish settlement of Bat Ayin, killing 13-year-old Israeli boy, Shlomo Nativ, and wounding a seven-year-old boy before fleeing the area. On 14 April, Israeli security forces captured the perpetrator; Moussa Tayet, a 26-year-old resident of Khirbet Safa in Beit Ummar. Islamic Jihad and Imad Mughniyeh claim responsibility for the attack.
- June 16 – Ten Palestinian Arab terrorists belonging to an al-Qaida-cell launch an attack at the Karni crossing using horses "laden" with explosives. Four terrorists and the horses are killed in the ensuring firefight with the IDF. No IDF soldiers are wounded.

== Notable deaths ==
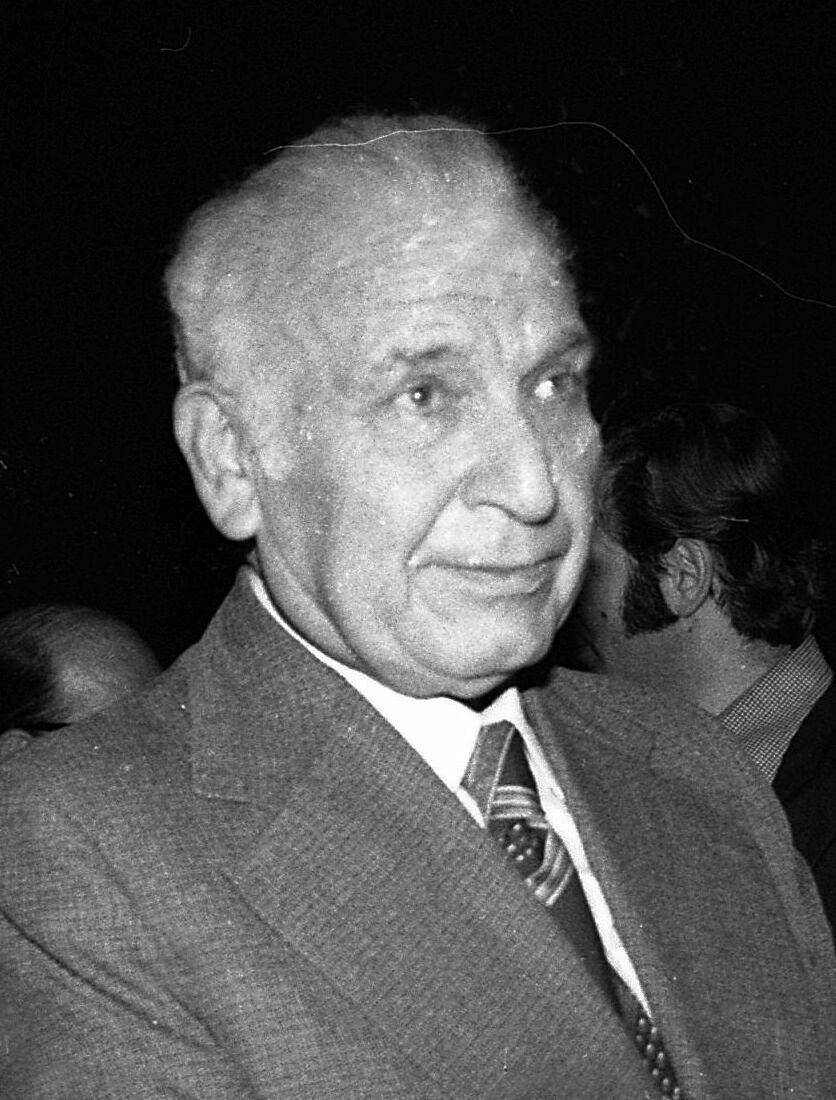
Ephraim Katzir

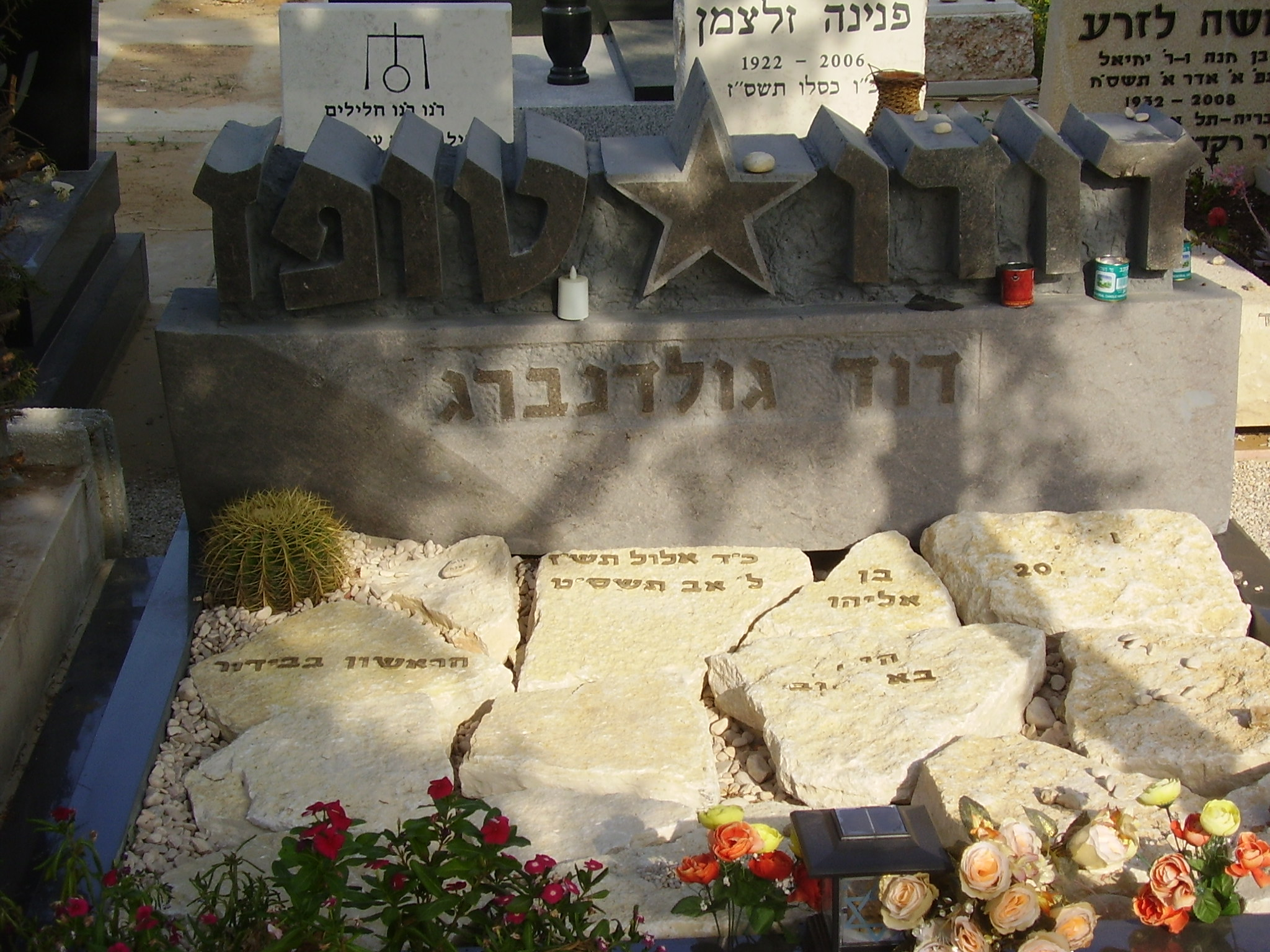
Dudu Topaz's grave in the "Yarkon" cemetery.

- January 7 – Yaakov Banai (born 1920), Polish-born Israeli Lehi commander.
- January 26 – Avraham Ravitz (born 1934), Israeli politician, member of the Knesset (1988–2009) – heart failure.
- February 1 – Arieh Levavi (born 1912), Russian (Lithuania)-born Israeli public servant, Ambassador to Argentina at the time of the capture of Adolf Eichmann.
- February 5 – Raaphi Persitz (born 1934), Israeli chess master.
- February 5 – Noah Weinberg (born 1930), American-born Israeli rabbi, founder of Aish HaTorah.
- February 20 – Shraga Weil (born 1918), Czechoslovak (Slovakia)-born Israeli painter.
- February 21 – Ilya Piatetski-Shapiro (born 1929), Soviet-born Israeli mathematician – Parkinson's disease.
- March 8 – Daud Turki (born 1927), Israeli Arab Communist poet and political activist, convicted of treason.
- April 26 – Salamo Arouch (born 1923), Greek-born Israeli boxer and Holocaust survivor.
- April 29 – Moshe Weinfeld (born 1925), Polish-born professor at the Hebrew University of Jerusalem.
- May 9 – Mendi Rodan (born 1929), Romanian-born Israeli conductor, composer and violinist – cancer .
- May 20 – Yehoshua Zettler (born 1917), Israeli resistance fighter (Lehi).
- May 25 – Amos Elon (born 1926), Austrian-born Israeli author and journalist.
- May 25 – Ephraim Katzir (born 1916), Russian (Ukraine)-born Israeli biophysicist and politician, President (1973–1978).
- June 26 – Jo Amar (born 1930), Moroccan-born Israeli singer.
- June 26 – Amnon Kapeliouk (born 1930), Israeli journalist and author.
- July 15 – Avraham Ahituv (born 1930), German-born Israeli intelligence chief, Director of the Shin Bet (1974–1980).
- July 17 – Meir Amit (born 1921), Israeli major general and politician.
- August 4 – Amos Kenan (born 1927), Israeli columnist, painter, sculptor, playwright and novelist – Alzheimer's disease.
- August 8 – Yehuda Cohen (born 1914), Israeli Supreme Court justice.
- August 10 – Yosef Tamir (born 1915), Russian (Ukraine)-born Israeli politician and environmental activist, member of the Knesset (1965–1981).
- August 20 – Dudu Topaz (born 1946), Israeli actor – suicide by hanging.
- September 7 – Ra'anan Naim (born 1935), Libyan-born Israeli politician, member of Knesset (1981–1984).
- October 7 – Moni Fanan (born 1946), Israeli basketball team manager – suicide hanging.
- October 7 – Shlomo Lorincz (born 1918), Hungarian-born Israeli politician – heart failure.
- November 2 – Amir Pnueli (born 1941), Israeli computer scientist and Turing Award winner.
- November 12 – Emanuel Zisman (born 1935), Bulgarian-born Israeli politician, Member of Knesset (1988–1999).
- November 14 – Moshe Gidron (born 1925), Israeli soldier, major general in the IDF.
- December 23 – Ike Aronowicz (born 1923), Danzig-born Israeli naval captain who during the Mandate period was the captain of the illegal immigrants ships "SS Exodus" and "Pan York" (Kibbutz Galuyot).

== Major public holidays ==
- Tenth of Tevet fast – January 6 (dawn to nightfall)
- Tu Bishvat – nightfall of February 8 to nightfall of February 9
- Fast of Esther – March 9 (dawn to nightfall)
- Purim – nightfall of March 9 to nightfall of March 10
- Shushan Purim (Jerusalem) – nightfall of March 10 to nightfall of March 11
- Birkat Hachamah – sunrise on April 8 (occurs once every 28 years)
- Fast of the Firstborn – April 8 (dawn to sunset)
- Passover and Chol HaMoed Pesach – sunset of April 8 to nightfall of April 15 (7th day) (an additional day is observed outside Israel)
- Holocaust Remembrance Day – nightfall of April 20 to nightfall of April 21
- Fallen Soldiers Remembrance Day – nightfall of April 27 to nightfall of April 28
- Israel's Independence Day – nightfall of April 28 to nightfall of April 29
- Lag Ba'omer – nightfall of May 11 to nightfall of May 12
- Jerusalem Day – nightfall of May 21 to nightfall of May 22
- Shavuot – sunset of May 28 to sunset of May 29 (a second day is observed outside Israel)
- Seventeenth of Tammuz fast – July 9 (dawn to nightfall)
- Ninth of Av fast – sunset of July 29 to nightfall of July 30
- Rosh Hashanah – sunset of September 18 to nightfall of September 20
- Fast of Gedalia – September 21 (dawn to nightfall)
- Yom Kippur – sunset of September 27 to nightfall of September 28
- Sukkot and Chol HaMoed Sukkot – sunset of October 2 to sunset of October 9
- Simchat Torah/Shemini Atzeret – sunset of October 9 to nightfall of October 10 (a second day is observed outside Israel)
- Hanukkah – nightfall of December 11 to nightfall of December 19
- Tenth of Tevet fast – December 27 (dawn to nightfall)

== See also ==
- 2009 in Israeli film
- 2009 in Israeli television
- 2009 in Israeli music
- 2009 in Israeli sport
- Israel in the Eurovision Song Contest 2009
- 2009 in the Palestinian territories
