= Medal of Valor (Israel) =

Israeli military decoration

עיטור הגבורה
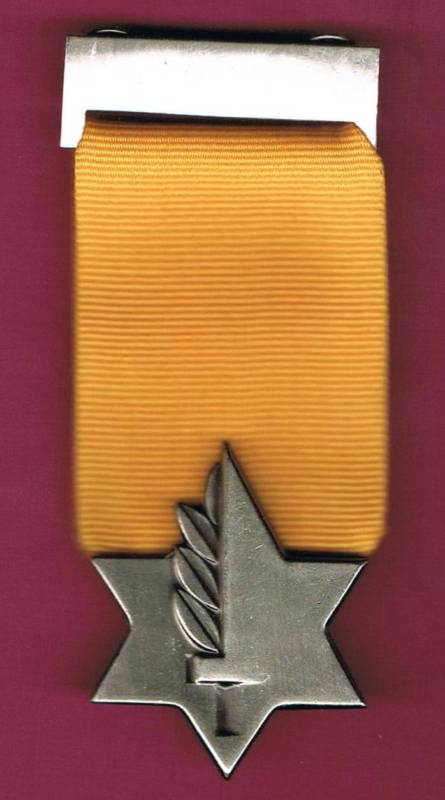
- Medal of Valor
- Type: Military decoration
- Awarded for: "Performing a supreme act of valor while facing the enemy and risking one's life"
- Presented by: Israel Defense Forces
- Eligibility: Soldiers of the Israel Defense Forces
- Status: Currently awarded
- Established: 1970; 56 years ago
- Final award: 1975

Highlights
- Total recipients: 40

Precedence
- Next (lower): Medal of Courage

The Medal of Valor (Hebrew: עיטור הגבורה,Hebrew pronunciation: [(ʔ)iˈtuʁ (h)agvuˈʁa] Itur HaGvura) is the highest Israeli military decoration.

The medal was established in 1970 by the Knesset in an act of law as a replacement for the Hero of Israel military decoration that was awarded during the 1947-48 Civil War in Mandatory Palestine and the 1948 Arab–Israeli War. Awards of the medal were also made for actions prior to 1970, and all recipients of the Hero of Israel automatically received the Medal of Valor as well.

Recipients of the medal receive several privileges such as a tax reduction and invitations to official state ceremonies.

To this day, 40 medals have been awarded: 12 for actions in the War of Independence (Hero of Israel recipients automatically received the Medal of Valor), four for the Sinai War, 12 for the Six-Day War, one for the War of Attrition, eight for the Yom Kippur War, and three others for actions during specific operations.

== Design ==
The medal was designed by Dan Reisinger in the shape of a Star of David. A sword and olive branch decorate the left side, while the reverse is plain. The medal is attached to a yellow ribbon, a reference to the yellow star that Jews were forced to wear during the Holocaust. Two time recipients of the medal attach a small medal-shaped clasp to the ribbon.

The medal is minted by the Israel Government Coins and Medals Corporation. It is made of 25 gram silver/935 and the clasp is chrome plated.

== Recipients ==
Name	Rank	Conflict	Place of action	Date of action	Reason for receiving medal
Yair Racheli	Private	War of Independence	Near Shefa-'Amr	19 January 1948	Destroyed an enemy position
Emmanuel Landau	Private	War of Independence	Kiryat Motzkin	17 March 1948	Captured an enemy supply truck
Avraham Avigdorov	Private	War of Independence	Kiryat Motzkin	17 March 1948	Destroyed two enemy Bren machine gun positions
Zerubavel Horowitz	Second lieutenant	War of Independence	Road to Jerusalem	27 March 1948	Covered the retreat of his comrades during an enemy attack
Yizhar Armoni	Private	War of Independence	Nabi Yusha	20 April 1948	Covered the retreat of his comrades and the evacuation of wounded soldiers
Emil Brig	Sergeant	War of Independence	Kibbutz Gesher area	14 May 1948	Destroyed a bridge and thus preventing the enemy from advancing
Zvi Zibel	Airman	War of Independence	Ben Shemen	25 June 1948	Delivered supplies to the besieged Ben Shemen while under heavy enemy fire
Ben-Zion Leitner	Private first class	War of Independence	Iraq Suwaydan	19 October 1948	Destroyed enemy bunkers
Ron Feller	Sergeant	War of Independence	Karatiyya	19 July 1948	Destroyed an enemy tank
Yohai Ben-Nun	Captain	War of Independence	Mediterranean Sea	22 October 1948	Sank the Egyptian Navy flagship
Siman-Tov Ganeh	Private	War of Independence	Iraq Suwaydan	19 November 1948	Covered the retreat of his comrades
Arieh Atzmoni	Master sergeant	War of Independence	Rafah	4 November 1948	Rescued a cannon from enemy hands
Yaakov Mizrachi	Private	Reprisal operations	Kuntila	28 October 1955	Displayed great courage in charging the enemy
Pinchas "Aloush" Noy	Lieutenant	Reprisal operations	Qalqilyah	10 October 1956	Charged enemy positions and killed nine enemy soldiers
Uzi Bar-Zur	Corporal	Sinai War	Sinai	26 October-5 November 1956	Rescued wounded soldiers while under fire
Dan Ziv	Second Lieutenant	Sinai War	Sinai	1 November 1956	Rescued wounded soldiers while under fire
Yehuda Ken-Dror	Private	Sinai War	Sinai	1 November 1956	Located enemy positions while under heavy enemy fire
Shlomo Nitzani	Sergeant	Sinai War	Sinai	26 October-5 November 1956	Rescued wounded soldiers and destroyed enemy positions while under heavy enemy fire
Zvi Ofer	Major	Reprisal operations	Nukaiv	16 March 1962	Charged enemy positions
Moshe Drimmer	Private	Six-Day War	Golan Heights	9 June 1967	Covered the retreat of his comrades
Daniel Wordon	Captain	Six-Day War	El-Arish	7 June 1967	Covered the rescue of wounded soldiers
Uri Weisler	Lieutenant	Six-Day War	Rafah	5 June 1967	Continued to engage the enemy while injured
Shaul Vardi	Sergeant	Six-Day War	Golan Heights	9 June 1967	Continued to engage the enemy while injured
Moshe Tal	Lieutenant	Six-Day War	Gaza Strip	5 June 1967	Commanded a force of half-tracks
Yosef Lapper	Sergeant	Six-Day War	Khan Younis	5 June 1967	Fought for eight hours alone with his tank
Eitan Neveh	Private	Six-Day War	Jerusalem	6 June 1967	Covered his forces in the Battle of the Ammunition Hill
Beni Inbar	Staff sergeant	Six-Day War	Rafah	5 June 1967	Destroyed eight tanks
Mordechai Friedman	Lieutenant	Six-Day War	Jerusalem	6 June 1967	Destroyed an enemy position
Gad Refen	Lieutenant	Six-Day War	West Bank	6 June 1967	Commanded the conquest of an enemy position near Jenin
David Shirazi	Private	Six-Day War	Golan Heights	9 June 1967	Charged an enemy position
Natanel Horovitz	Lieutenant	Six-Day War	Golan Heights	9 June 1967	Charged an enemy position
Ami Ayalon	Lieutenant	War of Attrition	Green Island	19 July 1969	Heroic action during Operation Bulmus 6
Oded Amir	Captain	Yom Kippur War	Port Said	6–24 October 1973	Commanded a force which damaged three enemy ships in Port Said harbour
Gideon Giladi	Major	Yom Kippur War	Egypt	15 October 1973	Commanded an armour battle
Zvika Greengold	Captain	Yom Kippur War	Golan Heights	6 October 1973	Delayed an enemy armour column
Moshe Levy	Sergeant	Yom Kippur War	Sinai	15 October 1973	Destroyed an enemy position
Yuval Neria	Captain	Yom Kippur War	Sinai	6–18 October 1973	Excellent conduct during numerous armoured battles
Shlomo Arman	Second lieutenant	Yom Kippur War	Sinai	6–8 October 1973	Excellent conduct during numerous armoured battles
Asa Kadmoni	Major	Yom Kippur War	Sinai	18 October 1973	Fought a large enemy force while surrounded
Avigdor Kahalani	Lieutenant colonel	Yom Kippur War	Golan Heights	9 October 1973	Excellent conduct during numerous armoured battles
