= 1925 in Mandatory Palestine =

- 1925 in the British Mandate of Palestine
«««
1924
1923
1922
»»»
1926
1927
1928
See also:
1925 in the United Kingdom
Other events of 1925

Events in the year 1925 in the British Mandate of Palestine.

== Incumbents ==
- High Commissioner – Sir Herbert Louis Samuel until 30 June; Herbert Onslow Plumer
- Emir of Transjordan – Abdullah I bin al-Hussein
- Prime Minister of Transjordan – 'Ali Rida Basha al-Rikabi

== Events ==
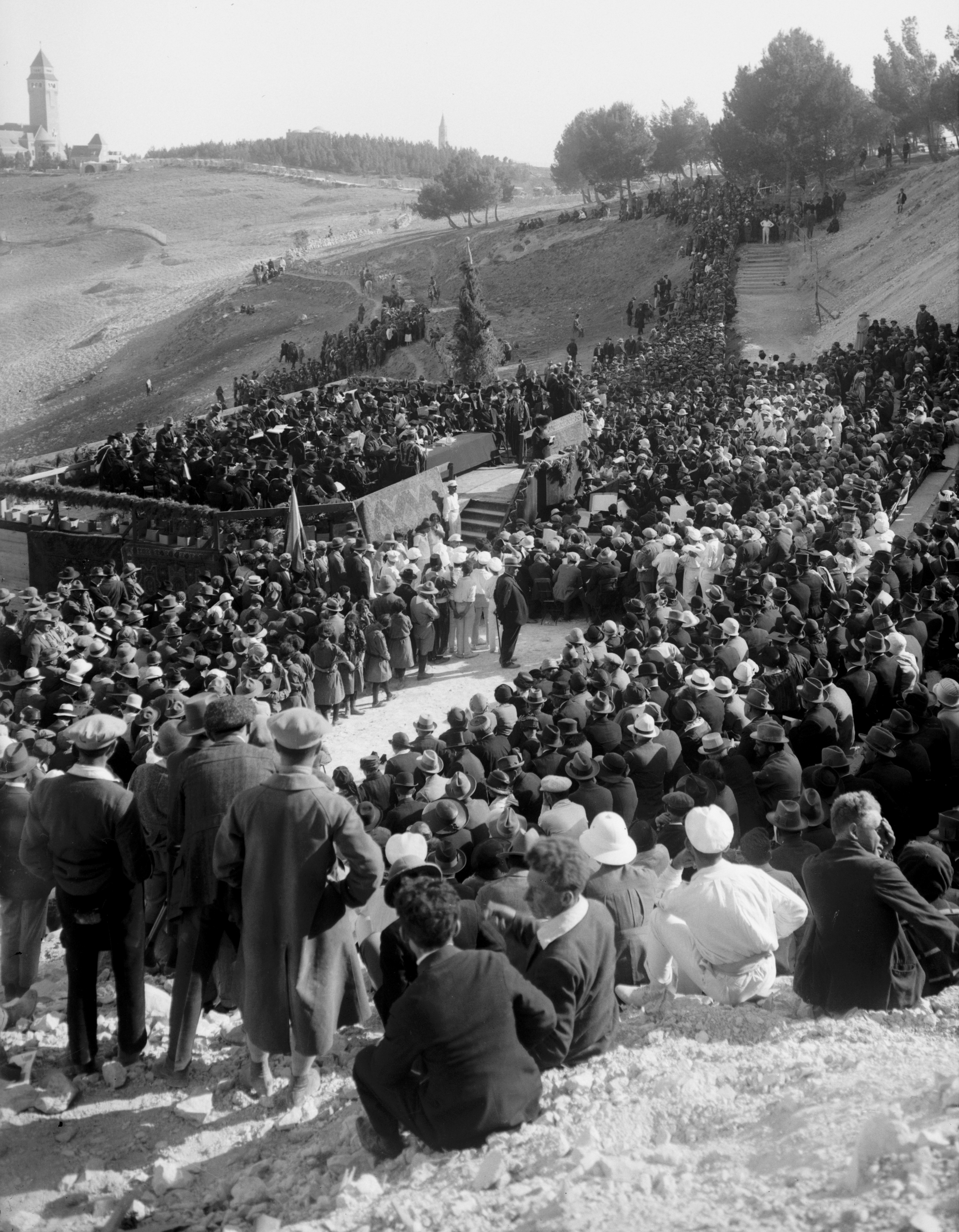
The opening ceremony of The Hebrew University of Jerusalem, 1 April 1925

- 6 February – The official opening ceremony of the Technion – Israel Institute of Technology.
- 1 April – The Hebrew University of Jerusalem campus on Mount Scopus is opened at a gala ceremony attended by the leaders of the Jewish world, distinguished scholars and public figures, and British dignitaries, including the Earl of Balfour, Viscount Allenby and Sir Herbert Samuel.
- 1 May – The founding of the kibbutz Givat HaShlosha by group of Jewish immigrants from Poland.
- 1 June – The first edition of the Hebrew-language daily newspaper "Davar" is published under the name Davar – Iton Poalei Eretz Yisrael (lit. Davar – Newspaper of Eretz Yisrael Workers).
- 1 August – The Palestinian Citizenship Order goes into effect granting Palestinian citizenship to previously Ottoman subjects "Habitually resident in the territory of Palestine"
- 6 December – Second Assembly of Jewish Representatives elected.

=== Unknown dates ===
- The founding of the moshav Ramatayim, one of the four original communities of Jewish agriculturalists that combined in 1964 to form Hod Hasharon.

== Notable births ==
- 6 January – Uzi Narkiss, Israeli general (died 1997)
- 29 January – Nathan Shaham, Israeli writer (died 2018)
- 10 March – Mordechai Alkahi, Irgun member and one of the Olei Hagardom (died 1947)
- 9 April – Kamal Nasser, Palestinian Arab politician, PLO leader, writer and poet (died 1973)
- 14 May – Yuval Ne'eman, Israeli physicist, politician, and President of Tel Aviv University (died 2006)
- 9 May - Hillel Barzel, Israeli academic (died 2022)
- 25 May – Moshe Gidron, Israeli military officer, major general in the IDF (died 2009)
- 7 June – Reuven Shefer, Israeli actor (died 2011)
- 16 July –Walid Khalidi, Palestinian Arab historian who has written extensively on the Palestinian exodus (died 2026)
- 24 August – Chaim Yaakov Goldvicht, Israeli rabbi, founding rosh yeshiva of Yeshivat Kerem B'Yavneh (died 1995)
- 25 August – Yeshayahu Gavish, Israeli general (died 2024)
- 2 November – Aryeh Nehemkin, Israeli politician (died 2021)
- 29 November – Zvi Zibel, Israeli soldier, posthumous recipient of the Hero of Israel award (died 1948)
- 1 December – Dov Levin, Israeli jurist, judge on the Supreme Court of Israel (died 2001)
- 24 December – Yafa Yarkoni, Israeli singer (died 2012)
- 25 December – Geulah Cohen, former Israeli politician and journalist (died 2019)
- 25 December – Shabtai Teveth, Israeli historian (died 2014)
- Full date unknown
  - Shlomo Moussaieff, Israeli jeweler (died 2015)
  - Yechiel Fishel Eisenbach, Israeli rabbi (died 2008)
  - Thurayyā Malḥas,Palestinian poet (died 2013)
