= 1926 in Mandatory Palestine =

- 1926 in the British Mandate of Palestine
«««
1925
1924
1923
»»»
1927
1928
1929
See also:
1926 in the United Kingdom
Other events of 1926

Events in the year 1926 in the British Mandate of Palestine.

== Incumbents ==
- High Commissioner – Herbert Onslow Plumer
- Emir of Transjordan – Abdullah I bin al-Hussein
- Prime Minister of Transjordan – 'Ali Rida Basha al-Rikabi until 26 June; Hasan Khalid Abu al-Huda

== Events ==
=== January ===
- Imperial Airways open an ordinary passenger service between Cairo and Baghdad via Gaza.

=== March ===
- 5 March – The British High Commissioner grants an exclusive 70-year concession to Pinhas Rutenberg of the Palestine Electric Corporation for production and distribution of electric power utilize the water of the Jordan River and the Yarmouk River (see First Jordan Hydro-Electric Power House)

=== April ===
- An international archaeological congress is held in Jerusalem, attended by around 90 representatives from global scientific institutions.
- 1 April – The Transjordan Frontier Force is formed as a para-military border guard to defend the northern and southern borders of the Transjordan region.
- 27 April – A memorial to the British 54th Division is unveiled in Gaza.

=== May ===
- War cemeteries at Ramleh and Jerusalem are formally dedicated by Field-Marshal Viscount Allenby.

=== June ===
- The Zionist Organization submits a memorandum to the League of Nations concerning the administration of the British Mandate for Palestine. The document is officially filed in Geneva by the Mandates Section.

=== July ===
- An earthquake causes significant damage and loss of life in Palestine and Transjordan, notably affecting Lydda, Ramleh, Nablus, Amman, and Es-Salt.

=== August ===
- Kibbutz Ramat Rachel is founded on the southern outskirts of Jerusalem.

=== November ===
- The Palestine and East Africa Loans Act receives Royal Assent, allowing a £4.5 million loan guaranteed by the British Treasury to the Palestine Government.
- 1 November – A new Palestine currency is issued and adopted simultaneously in Transjordan.
- 4 November – A revised import tariff is introduced, shifting from ad valorem to specific duties to protect local industries.

=== Unknown dates ===
- Freda White publishes "Mandates", a work that surveys territories under mandate, including Palestine.
- The founding of the kibbutz Ramat David.
- The founding of the moshav Beit She'arim by a group of Jewish immigrants from Yugoslavia.
- The founding of the agricultural settlement Bayit VaGan, which was originally geared towards Orthodox Jews.
- The founding of the moshav Karkur, one of the two original communities of Jewish agriculturalists that combined in 1969 to form Pardes Hanna-Karkur.
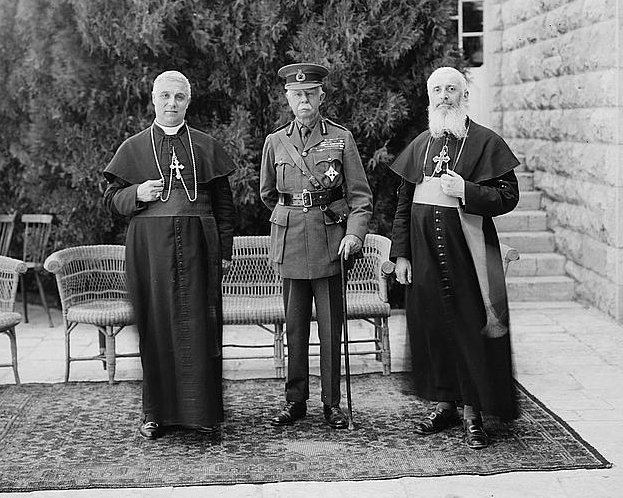
Lord Plumer with the archbishop of Naples and the Latin Patriarch, Jerusalem 1926

=== Naming controversy ===
In 1926, the British authorities formally decided to use the traditional Arabic equivalent to the English name, and its Hebrew transcription i.e. Filasţīn (فلسطين) and Pālēśtīnā (פּלשׂתינה) respectively. The Jewish leadership proposed that the proper Hebrew name should be ʾĒrēts Yiśrāʾel (ארץ ישׂראל, Land of Israel). The final compromise was to append the initials of the Hebrew proposed name, Alef-Yod, within parenthesis (א״י) after Pālēśtīnā whenever the Mandate's name was mentioned in Hebrew in official documents. The Arab leadership saw this compromise as a violation of the mandate terms. Some Arab politicians suggested "Southern Syria" (سوريا الجنوبية) as the Arabic name instead. The British authorities rejected this proposal; according to the Minutes of the Ninth Session of the League of Nations' Permanent Mandates Commission:

Colonel Symes explained that the country was described as "Palestine" by Europeans and as "Falestin" by the Arabs. The Hebrew name for the country was the designation "Land of Israel", and the Government, to meet Jewish wishes, had agreed that the word "Palestine" in Hebrew characters should be followed in all official documents by the initials which stood for that designation. As a set-off to this, certain of the Arab politicians suggested that the country should be called "Southern Syria" in order to emphasise its close relation with another Arab State.

== Notable births ==
- 10 January – Musallam Bseiso, Palestinian Arab thinker, intellectual, journalist, and politician (died 2017).
- 10 January – Yosef Kremerman, Israeli politician (died 1981).
- 17 January – Yitzhak Moda'i, Israeli politician (died 1998).
- 5 February – Avner Shaki, Israeli politician (died 2005).
- 18 February – Meir Cohen-Avidov, Israeli politician (died 2015).
- 5 March – Shimon Tzabar, Israeli artist, author, poet and Haaretz columnist (died 2007).
- 8 March – Moshe Litvak, Israeli footballer and manager (died 2012).
- 17 April – Aharon Yadlin, Israeli educator and politician (died 2022).
- 23 May
  - Amos Degani, Israeli politician (died 2012).
  - Shmulik Perlman, Israeli football player and manager (died 2003).
- 18 June – Avshalom Haviv, Irgun fighter and one of the Olei Hagardom (died 1947).
- 19 June – Meir Pa'il, Israeli politician and Palmach officer (died 2015).
- 20 June – Rehavam Ze'evi, Israeli general, politician and historian (died 2001).
- 22 June – On Sarig, Israeli children's author (died 2012).
- 30 June – Uriel Ofek, Israeli children's writer (died 1987).
- 17 July – Shlomo Morag, Israeli professor at the Hebrew University of Jerusalem (died 1999).
- 24 July – Zvi Dinstein, Israeli politician (died 2012).
- 26 July – Meir Nakar, Irgun fighter and one of the Olei Hagardom (died 1947).
- 2 August – George Habash, Christian Palestinian Arab nationalist, founder of the Popular Front for the Liberation of Palestine (died 2008).
- 4 August – Hillel Omer, Israeli poet and writer (died 1990).
- 13 August – Hanoch Bartov, Israeli author and journalist (died 2016).
- 24 August – Nisim Aloni, Israeli playwright (died 1998).
- 18 September - Eliezer Rafaeli, Israeli academic (died 2018).
- 28 September – Mordechai Hod, Israeli military officer, commander of the Israeli Air Force (died 2003).
- 29 September – Amos de-Shalit, Israeli nuclear physicist (died 1969).
- 5 October – Avraham Adan, Israeli general (died 2012).
- 7 October – Uri Lubrani, Israeli diplomat (died 2018).
- 10 October –Muin Bseiso – Palestinian poet. (died 1984)
- 23 November – Rafi Eitan, Israeli politician and former intelligence officer (died 2019).
- 10 December – Eliyahu Winograd, Israeli jurist, acting judge on the Supreme Court of Israel (died 2018).
- 26 December – Yosef Shapira, Israeli politician and educator (died 2013).
- 27 December – Elyakum Shappira, Israeli conductor (died 2014)
- Full date unknown
  - Hanna Batatu – Palestinian Marxist historian. (died 2000)
  - Baruch Mizrahi – Arab-born convert to Judaism and Irgun fighter (died 1948).

== Notable deaths ==
- 29 July – W. F. Sinclair, Superintendent of Police for the Northern District.
