= 1927 in Mandatory Palestine =

- 1927 in the British Mandate of Palestine
«««
1926
1925
1924
»»»
1928
1929
1930
See also:
1927 in the United Kingdom
Other events of 1927

Events in the year 1927 in the British Mandate of Palestine.

== Incumbents ==
- High Commissioner – Herbert Onslow Plumer
- Emir of Transjordan – Abdullah I bin al-Hussein
- Prime Minister of Transjordan – Hasan Khalid Abu al-Huda

== Events ==
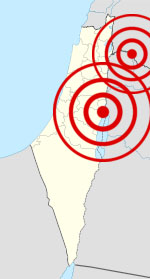
A 6.2-magnitude earthquake occurs in the regions of Palestine and Transjordan

- 1 April – The Hashomer Hatzair kibbutzim federate into the Kibbutz Artzi movement.
- 7 May – General Allenby lays the foundation stone of St Andrew's Church, Jerusalem
- 11 July – A 6.2-magnitude earthquake occurs in the regions of Palestine and Transjordan, killing an estimated 500 people. The effects are especially severe in Jerusalem and Nablus, but damage and fatalities are also reported in many other areas, including parts of Transjordan, in particular the town of Salt.
- 20 September – Kibbutz Beit Zera is established in the Jordan Valley, 15 km south of Tiberias.
- 1 November – The Palestine pound, the currency of the British Mandate of Palestine between 1927 and 1948, goes into circulation.
- Angel Bakeries is founded in Jerusalem by Salomon Angel, later becoming Israel's largest commercial bakery.
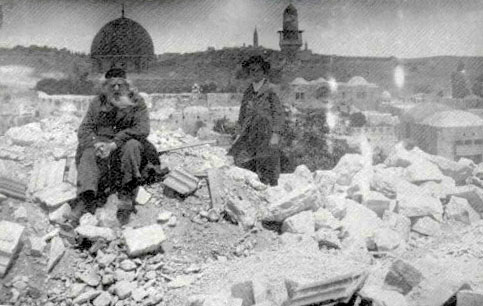
A house in the Jewish Quarter of Jerusalem which was completely destroyed during the 1927 Jericho earthquake

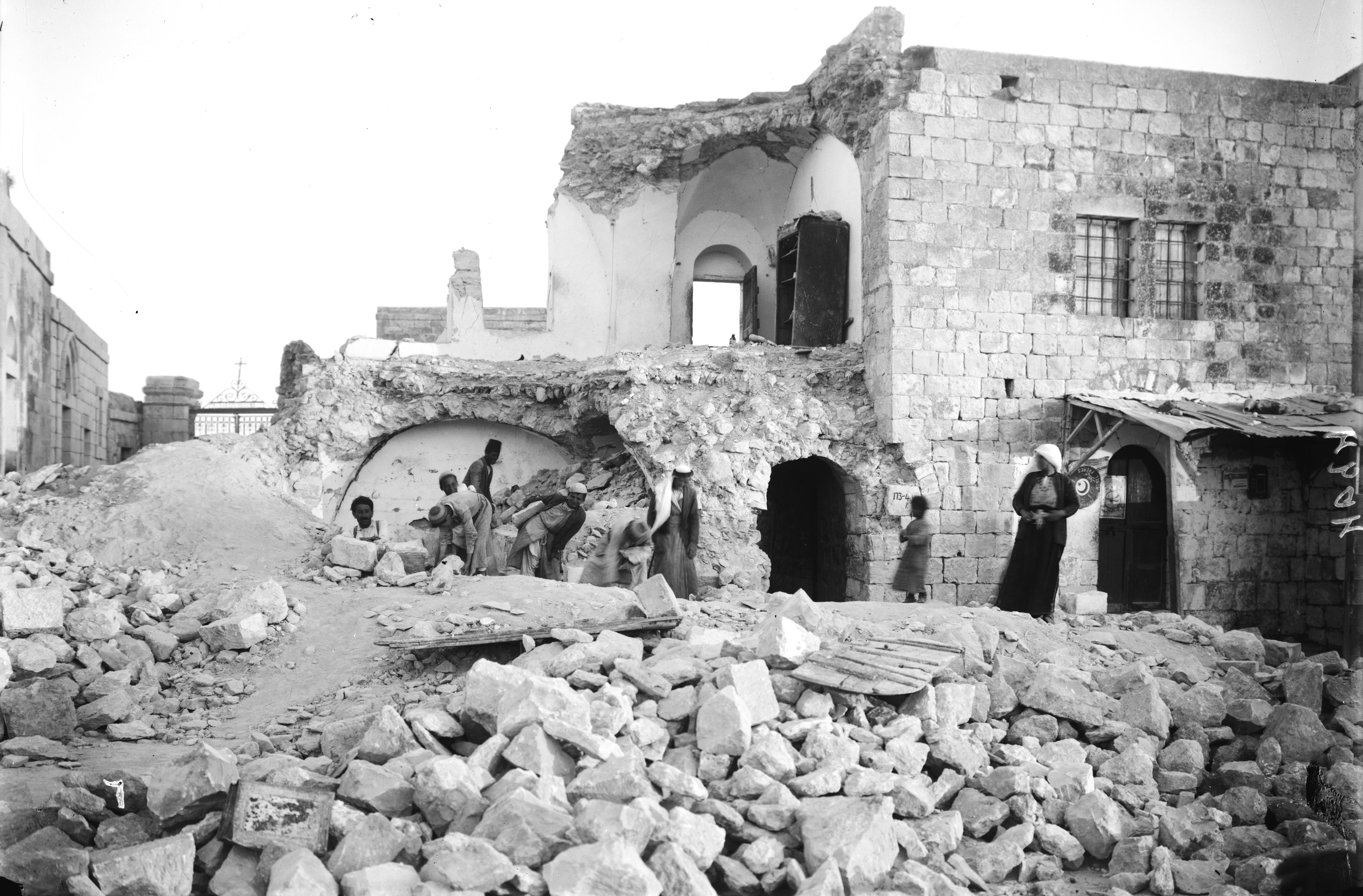
A destroyed house in the Mount of Olives, 1927

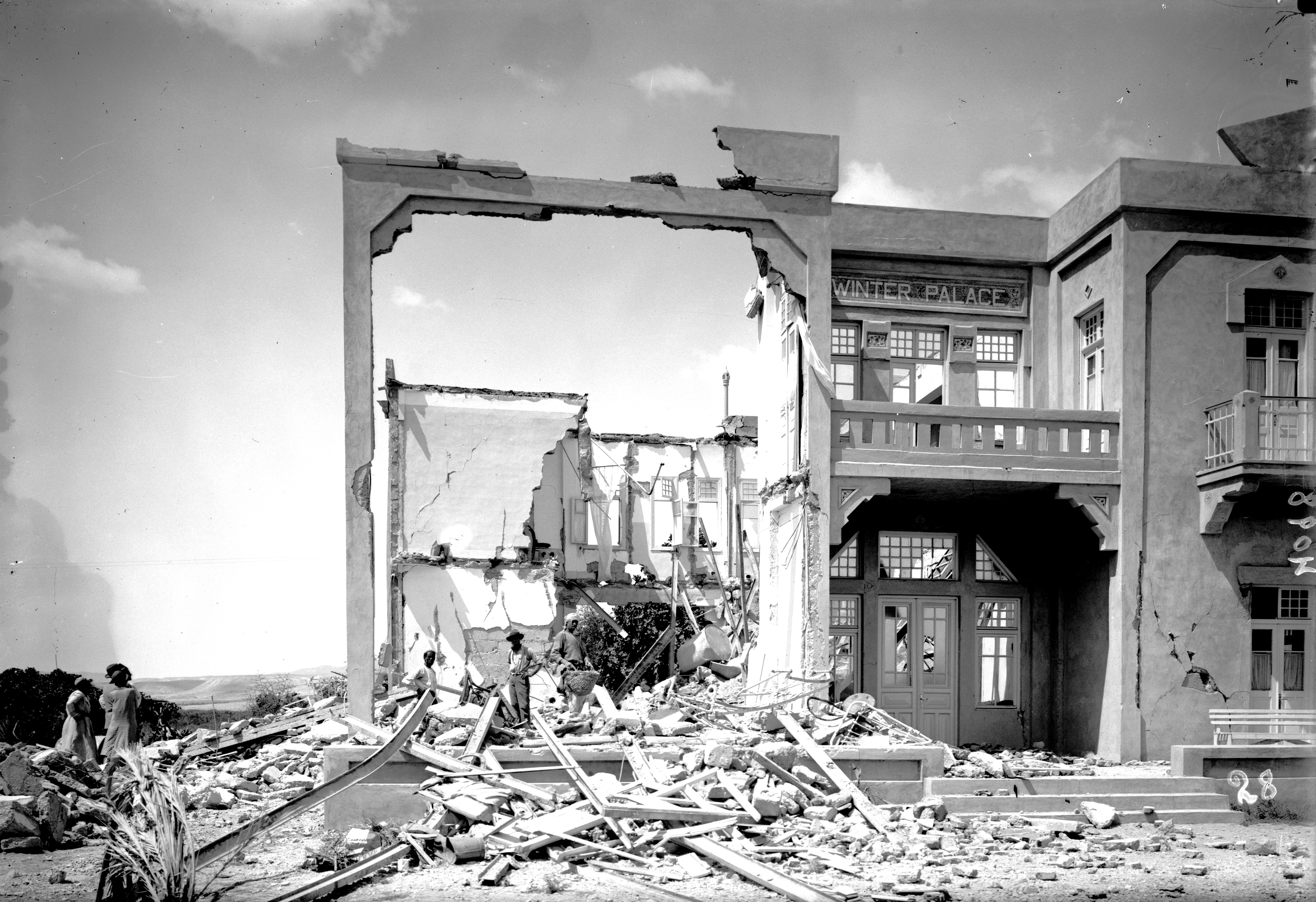
The destroyed "Winter Palace" Hotel in Jericho, 1927

=== Unknown dates ===
- 5 June - The founding of the kibbutz Ein Shemer.
- The founding of the kibbutz Shefayim.
- The founding of the moshav Hadar, one of the four original communities of Jewish agriculturalists that combined in 1964 to form Hod Hasharon.
- Between March to May, Mandatory Palestine held its first local elections across 22 municipalities.

== Births ==
- 16 January – Elazar ben Tsedaka ben Yitzhaq, Samaritan High Priest 2004–2010 (died 2010)
- 25 January – Yitzhak Hofi, Israeli general and Mossad director (died 2014)
- 18 February – Michael Harari, Israeli intelligence officer (died 2014)
- 2 March – Dov Ben-Dov, Israeli sports shooter (died 2020)
- 12 March – Elazar Granot, Israeli politician (died 2013)
- 30 March – Joel Silberg, Israeli director and screenwriter (died 2013)
- 20 April – Omar Aggad, Palestinian-Saudi Arabian investor, philanthropist (died 2018)
- 1 May – Tamar Bornstein-Lazar, children's book author and educator (died 2020)
- 2 May – Amos Kenan, Israeli columnist, painter, sculptor, playwright and novelist (died 2009)
- 6 May – Daniel Rosolio, Israeli politician (died 2005)
- 7 May – Joseph Agassi, Israeli academic (died 2023)
- 28 May – Salomón Cohen Levy, Israeli civil engineer and real estate businessman (died 2018)
- 6 June – Boaz Evron, Israeli journalist (died 2018).
- 16 June – Ya'akov Hodorov, Israeli football goalkeeper (died 2006).
- 8 July – Zivi Tzafriri, Israeli military officer (died 1956).
- 4 August – Naomi Polani, Israeli musical director, theater director, singer, producer, actress, and dancer (died 2024)
- 5 October – Meir Feinstein, Irgun fighter and one of the Olei Hagardom (died 1947)
- 21 October – Yuval Elizur, Israeli journalist, diplomat, and author (died 2019)
- 3 November – Yekutiel Adam, Israeli general (died 1982)
- 11 November – Elad Peled, Israeli general (died 2021)
- 29 December – Yehoshua Glazer, Israeli footballer (died 2018)
- Full date unknown
  - Aharon Davidi, Israeli general, founding member of the Paratroopers Brigade (died 2012)
  - Yaakov Heruti, Israeli lawyer, right-wing activist, and militant (died 2022)
  - Reuven Helman, Israeli athlete (died 2013)
  - Said al-Muragha, Palestinian Arab, former member of the PLO and founder of the Fatah Uprising group (died 2013)
  - Daud Turki, Israeli Arab Communist poet and political activist, convicted of treason after it was discovered that he headed an extensive espionage and sabotage organization (died 2009)
  - Hisham Sharabi, Palestinian historian and academic.(died 2005)

== Notable deaths ==
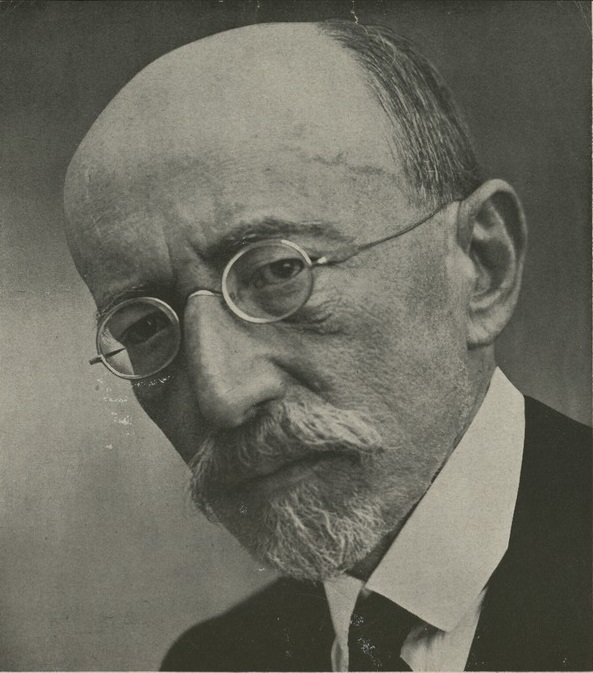
Ahad Ha'am

- 2 January – Asher Zvi Hirsch Ginsberg (Ahad Ha'am) (born 1856), Russian (Ukraine)-born Hebrew essayist and one of the foremost pre-state Zionist thinkers, known as the founder of Cultural Zionism.
- 1 February - Nosson Tzvi Finkel (born 1849), Russian (Lithuania)-born Orthodox Jewish leader.
- 11 February - Joel Engel (born 1868), Russian (Ukraine)-born composer.
