= Yuval Neria =

Israeli psychiatrist

- יובל נריה
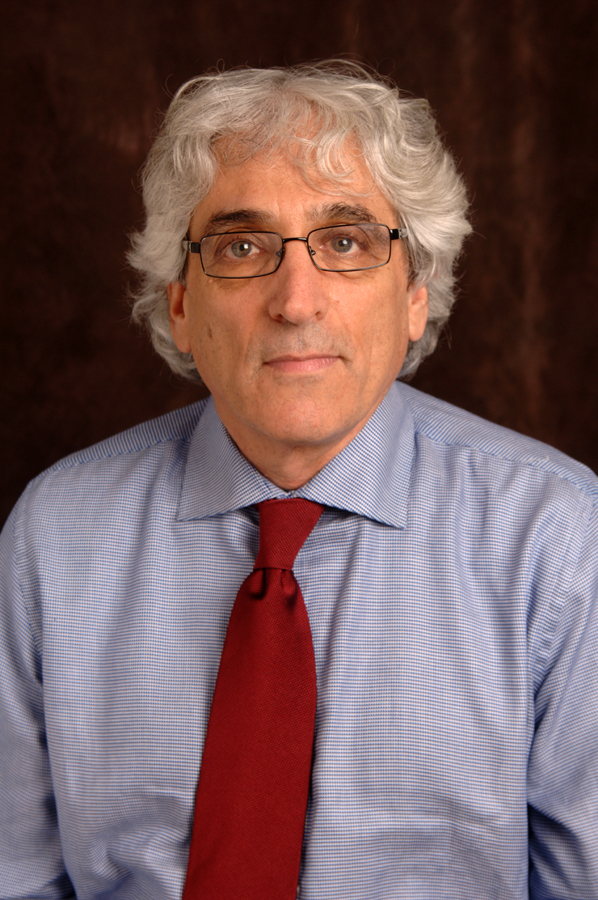
- Born: July 9, 1952 (age 74); Israel

Academic background
- Education: Hebrew University of Jerusalem (BA, MA); University of Haifa (PhD)

Academic work
- Discipline: Psychiatry
- Sub-discipline: Medical psychology
- Institutions: Tel Aviv University; Columbia University
- Main interests: Posttraumatic stress disorder
- Military career
- Allegiance: Israel
- Service years: 1970–1999
- Rank: Lieutenant colonel
- Conflicts: Yom Kippur War; 1982 Lebanon War
- Awards: Medal of Valor

Yuval Neria (Hebrew: יובל נריה; July 9, 1952) is a Professor of Medical Psychology at the Departments of Psychiatry and Epidemiology at Columbia University Medical Center (CUMC), and Director of Trauma and PTSD Program, and a Research Scientist at the New York State Psychiatric Institute (NYSPI) and Columbia University Department of Psychiatry. He is a recipient of the Medal of Valor, Israel's highest decoration, for his exploits during the 1973 Yom Kippur War.

== Early life ==
Neria grew up in Israel, and spent his childhood in the city of Holon with his younger sister, Nurit, and two parents, Zipora and Jacob Neria. At the age of 18, he joined the Israeli army and subsequently participated in the 1973 Yom Kippur War and the 1982 Lebanon war. In the Yom Kippur War, his performance as a tank commander in the Sinai front (where, in several battles, his tank was hit but he kept fighting, taking command of up to 10 different tanks before being injured and evacuated), earned him the Medal of Valor, the highest decoration for combat bravery in Israel, at the age of 22.

Neria's political views and body of work were deeply influenced by his war experiences. He was one of the founders of the Israeli grassroots movement "Peace Now," which sought to facilitate reconciliation between Israel, the Palestinians, and Arab countries. Neria has published a war novel, Fire (Zmora Bitan, 1986) (Esh in Hebrew), based on his painful experiences in the Yom Kippur 1973 War, and was later involved in efforts to improve policies regarding mental health care for returning war veterans and prisoners of war with post trauma psychopathology.

== Education and career ==
Neria completed his studies in philosophy (BA), political science (BA) and clinical psychology (MA) in the Hebrew University of Jerusalem, and received his doctorate (PhD) in psychology from the Haifa University, Israel, in 1994. He was the recipient of the Alon Fellowship for Outstanding Early Career Researcher, from Israeli Council for Higher Education (CHE) and served on the faculty of Tel Aviv University from 1995 to 2001. In the autumn of 2001, after the attacks of September 11, 2001 (9/11) he moved to New York following his recruitment to Columbia University in New York City with his wife, Mariana, a clinical psychologist, and his three children.

== Research ==
Neria's line of research has been focused on the emotional consequences of exposure to traumatic events. He has conducted numerous studies among Israeli veterans and prisoners of war, 9/11 bereaved, low-income primary care patients exposed to 9/11 attacks in New York City, and young adults exposed to ongoing missile and rockets attacks in southern Israel. While his main focus has been the study of posttraumatic stress disorder (PTSD) his studies have shown that the effects of psychological trauma are not limited to PTSD, and are often resulted in other debilitating disorders, beyond PTSD, including bipolar illness, generalized anxiety disorder (GAD), major depressive disorder (MDD), substance and alcohol abuse, borderline personality disorder, complicated grief, functional impairment and physical disorders.

To date, his lab at Columbia and NYSPI is focused on identification of biomarkers of PTSD, which may aid in diagnosis and treatment development. Specifically, members of the lab are using multi-modal magnetic resonance imaging (MRI) to describe altered connectivity among hippocampus sub-regions, associations between hippocampus size and treatment outcome and a series of measurable, functional and structural changes in the brain of PTSD patients following treatment. In a 2021 publication in the American Journal of Psychiatry, Neria described key discoveries in the neuroscience of PTSD and their application to clinical settings. He argued that the heterogeneity of the PTSD diagnosis is the most significant barrier to better understanding of the underlying neural signatures of PTSD, why they can't be effectively addressed by current treatments, and the potential of "big data" to facilitate diagnostic precision and personalized treatment.

== Publications ==
Neria has authored a war novel, Fire (Zmora Bitan, 1986), a novella, The Green Armchair (Kinneret, Zmora, Dvir, 2025), more than 300 scientific papers. He was the lead editor on three books: "9/11: Mental Health in the Wake of Terrorist Attacks" (Cambridge University Press, 2006), "The Mental Health Consequences of Disasters" (Cambridge University Press, 2009), and "Guide to Equine Assisted Therapy" (Springer, 2025), and co-edited two books: "Anxiety Disorders: Theory, Research and Clinical Perspectives" (Cambridge University Press, 2010) and "Interdisciplinary Handbook of Trauma and Culture" (Springer, 2016).
