= Ben-Zion Leitner =

Israeli soldier

- בן-ציון לייטנר
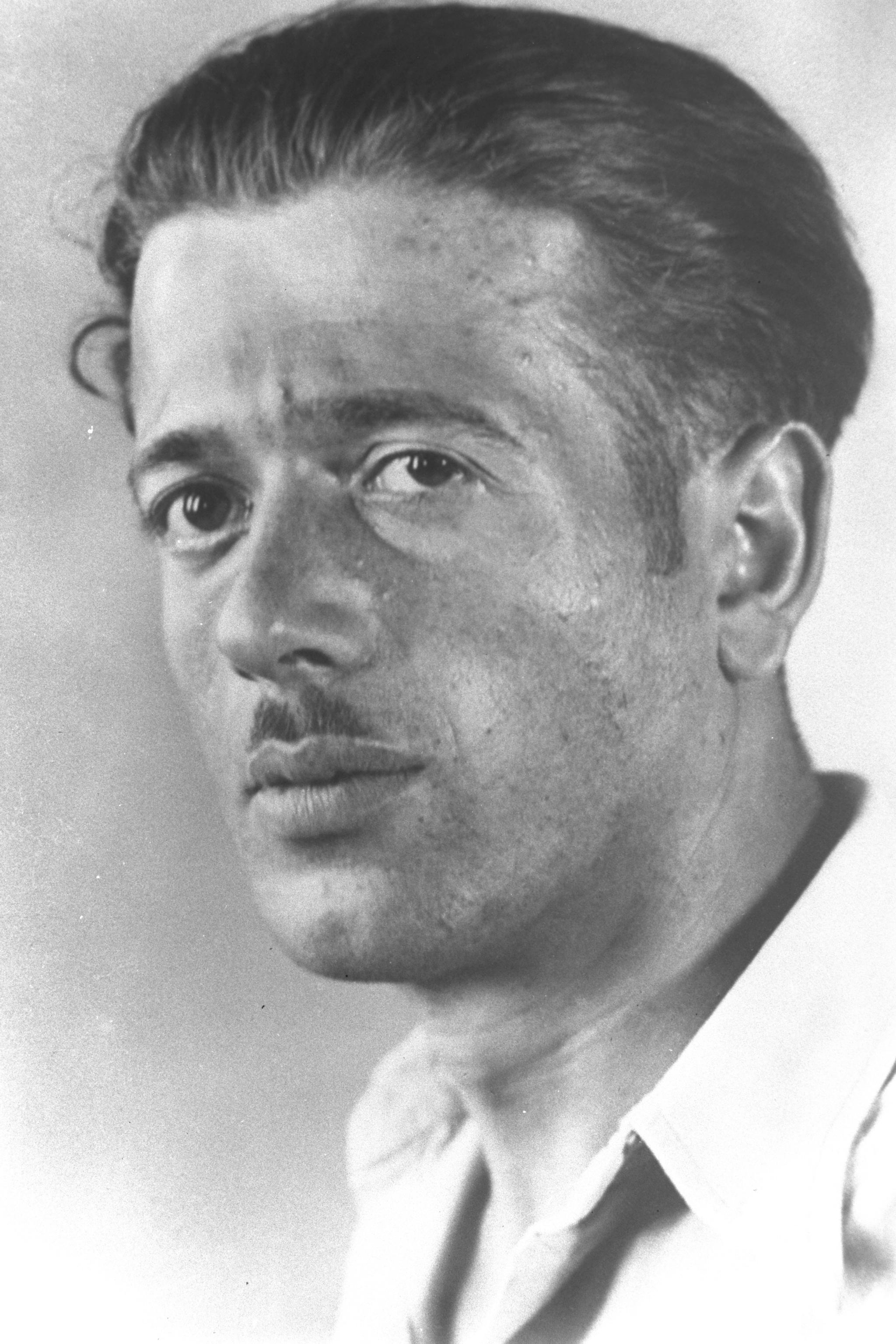
- Leitner circa 1949
- Born: March 14, 1927
- Died: March 25, 2012 (aged 85)
- Military career
- Allegiance: Israel
- Branch: Israel Defense Forces
- Rank: Private First Class
- Conflicts: World War II; 1947–1948 civil war in Mandatory Palestine; 1948 Arab–Israeli War
- Awards: Medal of Valor; Hero of Israel

Ben-Zion Leitner (Hebrew: בן-ציון לייטנר; March 14, 1927 – March 25, 2012) was an Israeli soldier, who received the nation's highest military decoration, the Hero of Israel citation (now the Medal of Valor), for heroism during the 1948 Arab–Israeli War.

Leitner was born in Odessa, Ukrainian SSR, Soviet Union, one of four children of Haim and Malka Leitner, and grew up in a religious Jewish community in Pidkamin. After the German invasion of the Soviet Union during World War II, his family was forced into the Brody Ghetto. Soon after, at the age of 14, he was sent to a labor camp while the rest of his family was deported to concentration and extermination camps. After about a year, he escaped the labor camp and joined the Soviet partisans. After two years, he was conscripted into the Red Army. He was the only member of his family to survive the war.

Following the war, he attempted to reach Mandatory Palestine on an Aliyah Bet ship but was stopped by the British and sent to an internment camp in Cyprus. In 1947, he immigrated to Palestine and settled in kibbutz Ashdot Ya'akov. With the outbreak of the 1947–1948 civil war in Mandatory Palestine, he fought with the Haganah in the 51st Battalion of the Givati Brigade. Following the Israeli Declaration of Independence and the start of the 1948 Arab-Israeli War, he continued fighting in the newly-established Israel Defense Forces on the southern front, participating in battles to secure the route to Beersheba and besieged Jewish settlements. He stood out in combat as a result of his military experience in World War II. On one occasion, he found himself engaged in a hand-to-hand knife fight with a large Sudanese scout serving with the Egyptian Army and managed to overcome him.

During Operation Yoav, Leitner participated in the battle to capture the police station at Iraq Suwaydan. After IDF troops were pinned down by fire from a bunker, he assaulted the position and managed to neutralize it with grenades while suffering severe wounds, including a bullet wound to the face and a knife wound to the abdomen. He was subsequently evacuated to hospital.

Leitner was paralyzed on the left side of his face and hospitalized for about a year as a result of his injuries. After being discharged from the IDF, he moved to Jaffa and opened a pastry shop. He married Sarah, and the couple moved to Givatayim before settling in Herzliya. They had three daughters. After initially working as a pastry chef, he worked as an importer of beverage vending machines, in the car rental business, an usher at Heichal HaTarbut, and a driver, and established a copper production plant in the Gaza Strip. He was frequently invited to lecture on his wartime experiences in schools and universities and was twice invited to light the torch during the Israeli Independence Day celebrations in 1973 and 1983.

He died in 2012 at the age of 85.
