= Emmanuel Landau =

Palmach fighter who was rewarded with the Hero of Israel

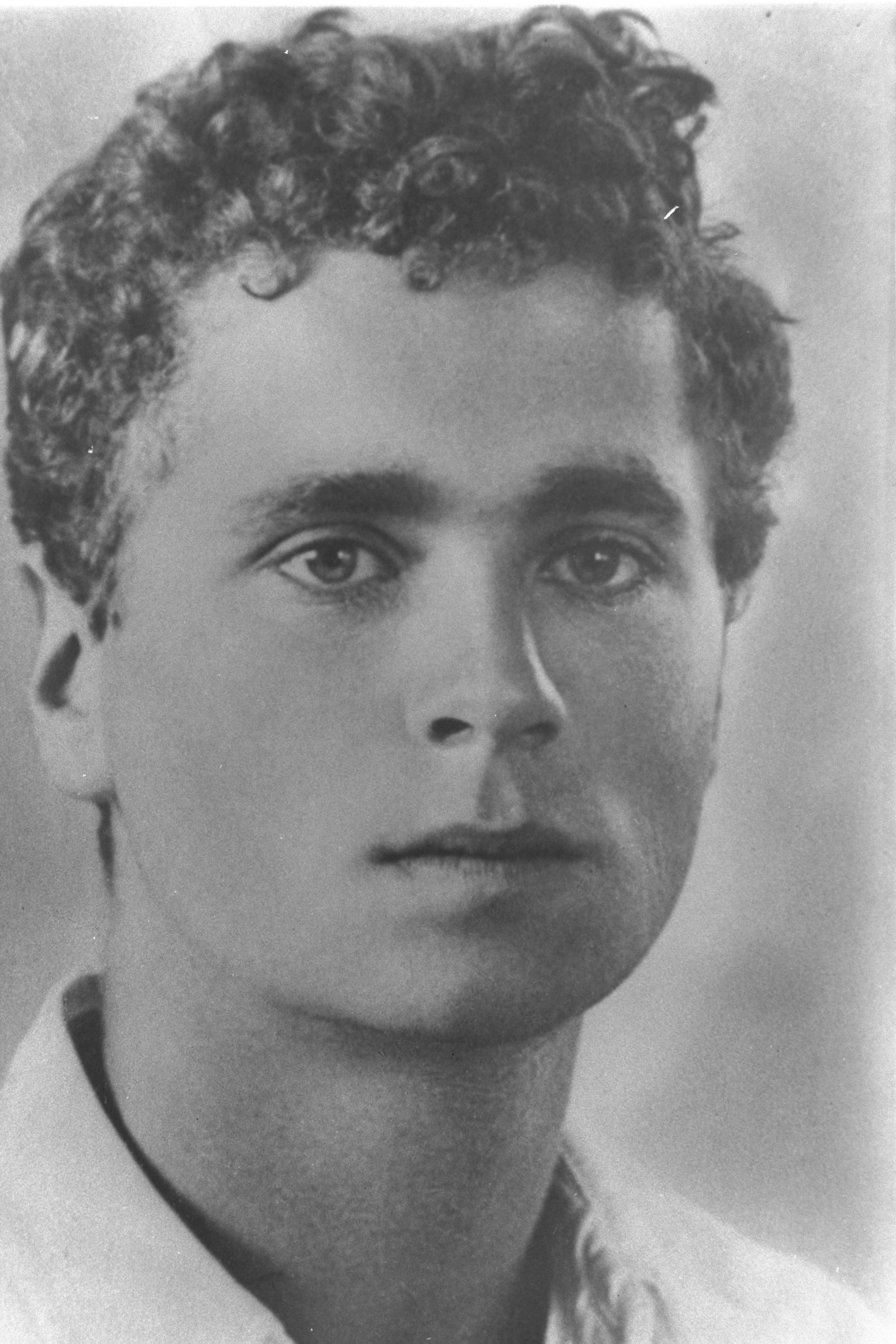
- Native name: עמנואל לנדאו
- Nickname: Emil
- Born: November 10, 1928; Warsaw, Poland
- Died: March 17, 1948 (aged 19) North of Kiryat Motzkin, Israel
- Buried: Jerusalem, Israel
- Allegiance: IDF
- Conflicts: 1948 Arab–Israeli War
- Awards: Hero of Israel

Emmanuel (Emil) Landau (Hebrew: עמנואל לנדאו; November 10, 1928 – March 17, 1948) was a Palmach fighter who was rewarded with the Hero of Israel.

He was born on November 10, 1928, in Warsaw, Poland. He and his younger sister fled from Poland to the Soviet Union on the eve of the outbreak of World War II. His father fell ill during his service in the Red Army, and died before the end of the war. His mother Fania handed him and his sister Elina (later Ilana) to a Christian orphanage, because she could not support them. A few months later, an emissary from Youth Aliyah arrived at the orphanage to take the Jewish children. This was the result of an agreement signed in 1942 between the Polish government-in-exile and the Soviet government, in which 120,000 Polish soldiers and refugees from the Soviet Union were allowed to transfer to British-controlled Tehran. Emil and Elina were among approximately 1,000 Jewish children who were taken by train to Tehran. The children, most of whom arrived with no parents, were housed in an orphanage set up for them.

In 1943, Emmanuel and his sister immigrated to Mandatory Palestine among a group of Jewish children in Tehran. After spending a short time at the Youth Aliyah camp in Jerusalem, Emil and Elina moved to the kibbutz Ginegar. During his stay at the Kibbutz, Emmanuel was discovered to be a great talent and a leader. His love for agriculture led him to study at the Kadouri Agricultural School and upon graduating with honors, he joined the Palmach and went to the training center in Ramat Yohanan.

== 1948 War ==
At the beginning of March 1948, news reached about an Arab convoy loaded with weapons leaving from Beirut for Haifa, in order to transfer it to Arab militias in the city, which would give the Arabs of Haifa a great advantage in the battles against the forces of the Yishuv. There were three trucks loaded with two tons of explosives, 550 rifles, submachine guns, about 120,000 rounds, and 1,000 hand grenades.

The first attempt to stop the convoy was carried out near Nahariya by the 21st Battalion of the Carmeli Brigade and failed. In the meantime, an additional force of 10 fighters from the First Battalion of the Palmach from the Ramat Yohanan was organized.

The rapid action did not allow for orderly organization or obtaining permits. The squad commanded by Noam Pasmanik set up an ambush on the side of the main road north of Kiryat Motzkin. When the caravan arrived, it encountered a barrel checkpoint on the road. The men of the force stormed the convoy, Abraham Avigdorov took control of the two Bren machine guns in the convoy. Passmanik threw a grenade at the caravan, and an explosive charge in one of the cars blew up and caused his death. In the explosion, the commander of the Arab force was also killed. As Landau jumped on one of the two remaining weapons trucks to retrieve the loot and transfer it to the Palmach, one of the bullets caused the explosives to explode in the truck, and as a result of the explosion, Emmanuel Landau was killed and Avigdor was seriously injured.

The liquidation of the convoy caused a decline in morale among the Arabs in Haifa and an increase in the flight of Arab residents of the city, including members of the Arab Higher Committee.

Landau and Avigdorov were awarded the Hero of Israel for their heroism during the battle. IDF's stated reason for awarding Landau:

On March 17, 1948, in Kiryat Motzkin, in an attack on an enemy convoy of weapons and ammunition, Private Emanuel Landau was among the unit members who stormed the enemy cars, and as a driver jumped onto one of the cars loaded with weapons to remove her from the battlefield. He crashed in an explosion that went off and fell.

Emmanuel's younger sister, Ilana (Landau-Karniel), was the last remnant of the family. In his name he received the "Hero of Israel" medal in a ceremony held on July 17, 1949.
