= Moshe Levy (soldier) =

Israeli military personnel (born 1946)

- משה לוי
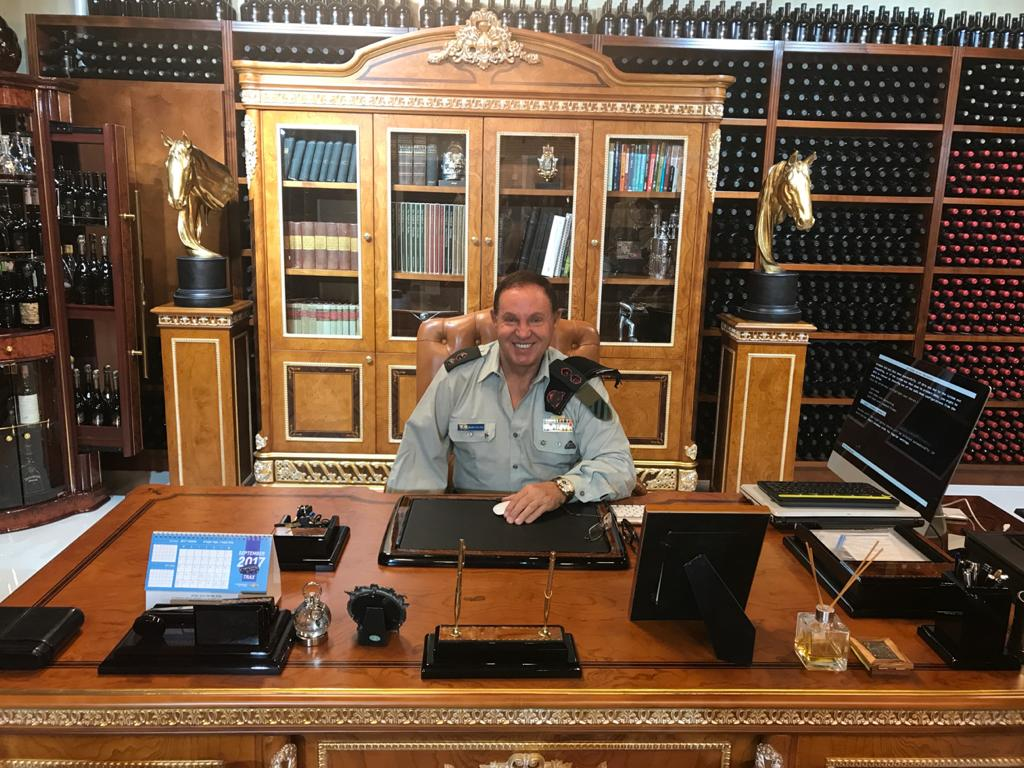
- Born: 1946 (age 79–80); Tunisia
- Military career
- Allegiance: Israel
- Branch: Israel Defense Forces
- Rank: Sgan Aluf
- Conflicts: Yom Kippur War
- Awards: Medal of Valor

Moshe Levy (Hebrew: משה לוי; born 1946) was a half-track commander in the Israeli Armored Corps and was awarded the Medal of Valor for his fighting in Sinai during the Yom Kippur War.

== Biography ==
Moshe Levy was born in Tunisia. His brothers and sisters were killed in World War II in a German bombardment, in 1948 he immigrated to Israel with his parents. At first, he grew up in a refugee absorption camp and later in Magdiel. His father died when Moshe was 8 years old. Later, he was educated at the "Neve Amiel" yeshiva high school in Sde Ya'akov and in the Youth Ailyah's "HaShomer" farm in Ilaniya, and later moved from Yavne to Ashdod.

== Military career ==
When the Yom Kippur War broke out, Levy was 28 years old, married and father of a son and daughter. About two months before the war, he was injured in a car accident and broke his patella. A month before the war, his reserve unit was called into action, but he was still in cast and not enlisted; Only two weeks before the outbreak of the war, the doctors removed the bandage. Despite the improvement in his condition, Levi was not enlisted, so he decided on his own to go and join the battalion. Ze'ev Littman, a battalion commander in Brigade 11 (Yiftah Brigade) appointed him to command a half-track, and that evening he joined the journey to the front in Sinai.

On October 8, the brigade deployed in the El Qantara area and Company L, to which Levy belonged, conducted pursuits after Egyptian commandos. On October 15, when his unit was in Beluzah (Pelusium), a call was received for the rescue of an IDF force caught in an Egyptian ambush on the "plastic road" on its way to “Fort Budapest”. The Egyptian commando fighters waited until the rescue force's half-tracks entered the area where they had entrenched themselves, and then attacked with the AT-3 Sagger missiles and rockets that disabled most of the vehicles. Levy's half-track was hit by a rocket in the caterpillar track. His right arm was cut off below his shoulder by the wing of a missile that passed over him. With a bleeding arm, he ordered the soldiers to jump after him out of the half-track, four soldiers who didn't jump out were killed by a missile.

Levy was certain that he would not survive and therefore decided to attack the position of the Egyptian ambush. After failing to shoot from the Uzi submachine gun he had in his possession, he decided to move to the post and throw a hand grenade into it. The Egyptian soldiers, who noticed his bleeding arm, did not see his left hand with the grenade and did not shoot him. They may have thought he was going to surrender. From a distance of about ten meters, Levy threw the grenade and disabled the post, but fragments of the grenade hit his face and chest. When he got up, he was shot in the back. The bullet from this shot remained in his body even after he recovered from the injury.

The description of the deed reads:

On October 15, 1973, Corporal Moshe Levy, a platoon sergeant, took part in a battle that his company conducted with an Egyptian ambush on the sea route to the northern post in the “Port-Fuad-Budapest” sector. During the battle, the half-track he was in command of was hit, and another anti-tank bomb that was fired hit his right arm and cut it in the elbow area. Corporal Moshe Levy understood the severity of the situation and ordered his crew to get out of the half-track. While leaving the half-track, most of the soldiers were hurt. Corporal Moshe Levy, with his right arm cut off and bleeding, descended from the half-track and moved toward the nearby enemy post. In his left hand he held a grenade, and with his teeth he pulled off the safety catch. He threw the grenade and the enemy force inside the post was eliminated. However, since he was very close to the enemy post, he was wounded by shrapnel from the grenade he himself had thrown. However, he refused to receive help and directed the evacuation team to the casualties of his half-track. Meanwhile, the half-track was hit directly, went up in flames and exploded.

— Be’Oz Rukham (in their courage) website

For his acts in the battle, Levy was decorated with Medal of Valor by Defense Minister Shimon Peres for "valiant courage, bravery, fortitude and dedication to the mission."

== Civil career ==
After completing mandatory military service, he joined the police and worked in the Special Tasks Department in the Tel Aviv District, and in the Elta Systems. After recovering from his injuries, he went to study in the United States, where he received a bachelor's and master's degree in business administration.

In 1982, he returned to Israel to join the First Lebanon War. He did not participate in combat, but joined his friends at Lake Qaraoun in Lebanon, in 1983, after completing his master's degree, he returned to Israel and served as CEO of Magal Systems for five years, after which he returned to the United States and became CEO of “Safeguards Technology”, and later acquired it. Levy holds security businesses, where, among others, he is responsible for the security of nuclear reactors and military bases of the US Navy and the US Air Force. He was also responsible for the security of Camp David, nuclear reactors in Canada and the O’Hare International Airport in Chicago. in 1966, along with Zvika Greengold and entrepreneur Israel Lang, he purchased the Saslov Winery, and appointed his daughter, Sigal Levy, as CEO of the winery.

== Personal life ==
In 2013, a documentary film was made to mark the 40th anniversary of the Yom Kippur War, in which he is interviewed and tells about his life before the war, during the war, and today. That same year, Levy returned to Israel, joining his wife, son, daughter and two granddaughters living there.
