= On Sarig =

On Sarig (Hebrew: און שׂריג) is one of several pen names of Shraga Gafni (Hebrew: שרגא גפני; June 22, 1926 – January 19, 2012), an Israeli author of children's books. Under this name, Gafni wrote the "Danidin" series, one of the most popular children book series in Israel, chronicling the fictional adventures of an invisible child.

== Bibliography ==
=== The Danidin Series ===
Twenty nine books in the Danidin series have been published under the On Sarig name, beginning in 1961 with "The adventures of Dani, who can see but not be seen". The last book published was "Danidin in the Jungle" (2001). In the series, young Dani becomes invisible after drinking a purple liquid. In many of the series' books he fights against Arab enemies, and always wins.

=== Newer series ===
In 1999, Gafni published two additional children's adventure book series under the On Sarig name. The first series is "Tzviki Matzhiki". Two books have appeared in this series ("Tzviki Matzhiki and his Wonderful Adventures", "Tzviki Matzhiki in a Joke Competition"). The series is about a child who enters the virtual world of his favorite television program with his shape-changing robot. The second series is "Gili Gol HaKol Yachol" (Gili Gol Can Do Anything), about a boy who discovers that he has astounding magic powers. Two books in the series have been published by M. Mizrahi.

== Controversy ==
The Danidin series has been cited as an example of "hate literature", which promotes anti-Arab stereotypes in Israeli children's literature.
