= Avraham Avigdorov =

Israeli soldier

- אברהם אביגדורוב
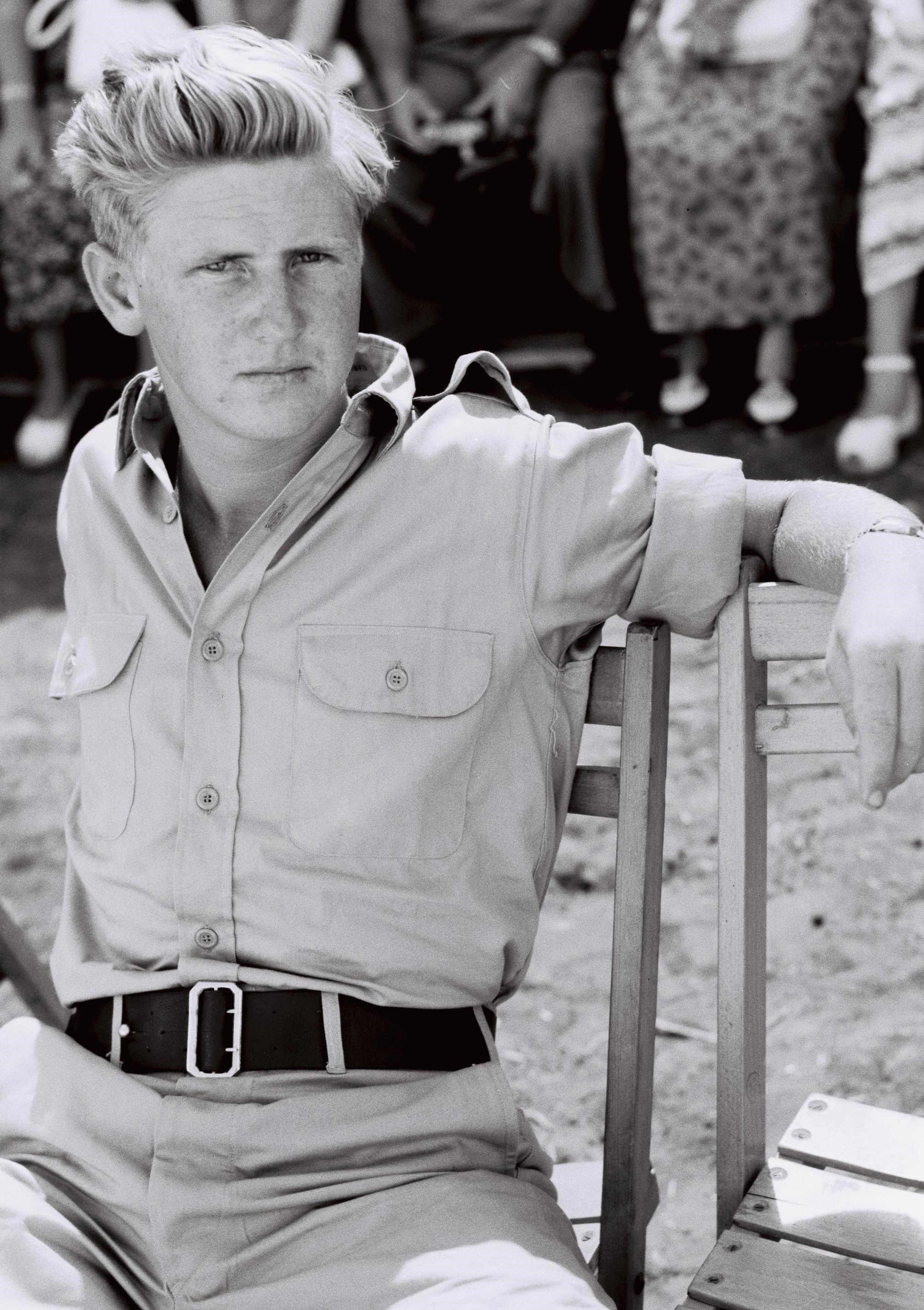
- Avraham Avigdorov, 17 July 1949
- Born: July 2, 1929; Mitzpa, Mandatory Palestine
- Died: September 4, 2012 (aged 83); Haifa, Israel
- Military career
- Allegiance: Yishuv, Israel
- Branch: Palmach
- Service years: 1947–1948
- Rank: Private
- Conflicts: 1947–1949 Palestine war
- Awards: Medal of Valor; Hero of Israel

Avraham Avigdorov (Hebrew: אברהם אביגדורוב; July 2, 1929 – September 4, 2012) was an Israeli soldier and recipient of the Hero of Israel award (today the Medal of Valor), the highest Israeli military decoration. Avigdorov received the award for destroying two Bren machine gun positions on March 17, 1948, during the civil war phase of the 1947–1949 Palestine war.

== Biography ==
=== Early life ===
Avigdorov was born in 1929 in Mitzpa, a moshava near Tiberias in Mandatory Palestine. His father Gad, a member of HaShomer, was killed in the 1936 Arab Revolt. Avigdorov studied agriculture at Mikve Israel.

=== Military service and aftermath ===
After finishing his studies, Avigdorov joined the Palmach in July 1947 and was assigned to the Yiftach Brigade.

On March 18, 1948, during the civil war fought in the dying days of the British administration and shortly before the establishment of Israel and the outbreak of the 1948 Arab-Israeli War, he was part of an ambush of an Arab weapons convoy in the Kiryat Motzkin area. Avigdorov killed two Bren machine gunners defending the convoy and damaged their vehicle, thus turning the tide of the battle in the Palmach's favor. The vehicle he damaged exploded, seriously injuring Avigdorov. According to Avigdorov, he was placed in the morgue in the Rothschild Hospital in Haifa after being proclaimed dead by a local doctor. He was taken out after showing signs of life and stayed in a hospital with burns and a broken jaw until 1949. In that year he was operated on by South American plastic surgeons and released.

In July 1949 he was awarded the Hero of Israel citation, and in April 1973 he received the Medal of Valor automatically.

Following the Yom Kippur War of 1973, Avigdorov visited bereaved families, as well as wounded veterans, to show them that one could live with an injury.

=== Later life ===
In civilian life, he worked for the Ministry of Agriculture in testing pesticides.

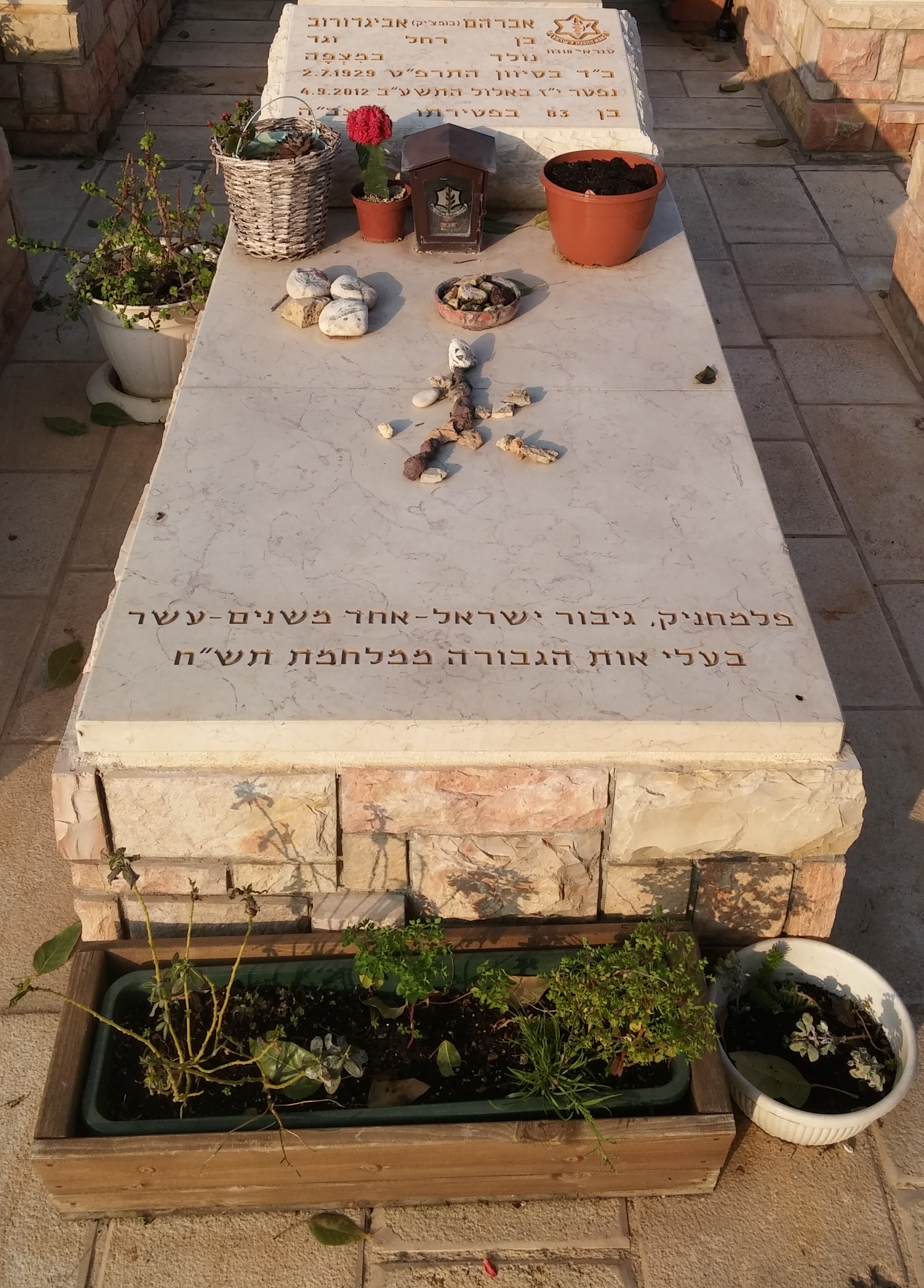
Grave of Avraham Avigdorov (Old cemetery, Herzliya)

== Personal life ==
Avigdorov married Aliza and they had three children.
