= Yuval Elizur =

Israeli journalist, diplomat, and author (1927–2019)

- יובל אליצור
- Born: October 21, 1927; Jerusalem
- Died: September 10, 2019 (aged 91)
- Occupation: Journalist
- Known for: Who Rules Israel

Yuval Elizur (Hebrew: יובל אליצור; October 21, 1927 – September 10, 2019) was an Israeli journalist, diplomat and author who worked as a journalist for 51 years until his retirement in 2005 . He published eight books on the Israeli economy, globalization, and economic warfare, including Who Rules Israel, which was published in the United States by Harper and Row in 1973. Since his retirement, Yuval researched the effect of Jewish Ultra-Orthodoxy on Israel. He lived in Jerusalem.

== Biography ==
Yuval Elizur was born in Jerusalem on October 21, 1927. His father’s family came to Israel from Lithuania in the 1840s to escape assimilation. During Yuval’s childhood, his father left the walled Old City of Jerusalem in order to join the new Zionist arrivals.

From 1945-1947, Yuval served in the Palmach, the striking force of the Haganah (Defense), the illegal army of the majority of Israeli Jews in Palestine. After the establishment of the State of Israel in 1948, he became an intelligence officer in the newly established Israeli Air Force. As a teenager, Elizur dreamed of becoming a journalist, and found a way to balance the quest for a career in writing with duty to country in the Palmah.

In 1953, Yuval finished an undergraduate degree in economics from the Hebrew University in Jerusalem. In 1954, he obtained an MSc in Journalism from Columbia University and became the first Israeli to attend the Pulitzer School. While in New York City, he met his wife, Judith Neulander, who had obtained a PhD in Political Science from Harvard University.

After returning to Jerusalem, Yuval started working as a journalist for Ha’aretz and later for Ma’ariv, where he worked for 38 years until retiring in 2005 from his position as Deputy Editor. He also served as the Israeli correspondent for The Washington Post and The Boston Globe. During his years as a journalist, he took two leaves of absence in order to serve in the Israeli Foreign Office, mainly on the subject of economic warfare. Between 1964 and 1966, he served as Consul at the Consulate General of Israel in New York.

== Published works ==
- Who Rules Israel (1973)
- Ha-Mimsad: Mi Sholet Be-Yisrael (1973)
- Yisrael Veha-Etgar Ha-Globali (2005)
- A Memoir of Life in Journalism
- The War Within (2013)
