= Biometric Database Law =

Israeli law

Inclusion of Means of Biometric Identification and Biometric Identification Data in Identification Documents and in a Database Act, 5770-2009

Knesset
- Citation: SĦ 5770 256

Amended by
- SĦ 5770 418
- Status: Amended

The Biometric Database Law is an Israeli law which the Knesset passed in December 2009, determining that fingerprints and facial contours would be collected from all Israeli residents, that the collected data would be integrated onto the Israeli digital identity cards and digital passports, and that a biometric government database of all Israeli citizens and residents would be created which would be used for biometric identification that would allow the management of access control, identification of individuals and assist in locating individuals suspected of criminal activity by the law enforcement officials. When the law passed in December 2009 it was determined that the law be gradually applied and that at the first phase, the inclusion of one's biometric data in the central database would be voluntary.

== Goals ==
The law's targets which are presented in its first section are:

1. Determining the arrangements which would allow the identification and verification of the identity of Israeli residents by including biometric identification means and biometric identification data in passports and identity cards, to prevent forgery and the using of a false identity, and to determine the permitted uses of such data and measures;
2. Establishment of a biometric database which would include biometric identification means which would be integrated onto identification documents, as described in paragraph (1), biometric identification data generated from them, and defining the permitted uses of the database by the Israel Police forces and the Israeli security authorities;
3. Determining the necessary arrangements to protect the privacy of the residents who provided their biometric data, determining the means of access to the biometric database and securing the information in it.

The law addresses serious issues in identifying fake ID cards and passports, producing double records for the same person, and identity theft which are caused when using the documentation of a person from whom the identity was stolen. These examples, allow the misuse of identification documents for illegal immigration, criminal and economic offenses, and activities which harm Israel's national security. Nowadays identification documents are easily forged by criminals, who often try to get the assistance of state workers. From 2005 to 2007 the Interior Ministry reported the loss, theft and destruction of about 150,000 ID cards per year, for which submitted requests were handed in for new identity cards. In many cases, in question the loss, theft and destruction of the ID cards occurred several times for the same resident during these three years. The data of the Israeli Police indicates that about 52 percent of the individuals who submitted requests for new identity cards after theirs was lost, stolen and/or destroyed, between the years 1995 to 2006 had a criminal record, of which 10 percent have a criminal record of distribution of counterfeit documents.

== Clauses ==
The employees of the Interior Ministry would be authorized to collect biometric identification data from the Israeli population, and to transfer the data to a database which would be managed by the biometric database management authority (הרשות לניהול המאגר הביומטרי). This data would be used to issue resident identification documents and for verification of an individual's identity, by the means of rechecking an individual's biometric identification data by authorized officials (police officer, an employee of the Shin Bet, an employee of the Mossad, etc.).

The biometric database would be stored separately from the government's older existing identity database, although selected government officials would be capable of linking between the two databases to retrieve additional data.

== Opposition ==
Opponents of the law, including prominent Israeli scientists and security experts, warned that the existence of such a database could damage both civil liberties and state security, because any leaks could be used by criminals or hostile individuals against Israeli residents.

== See also ==
- Biometrics
- Biometric passport
