= Yohai Ben-Nun =

Israeli general

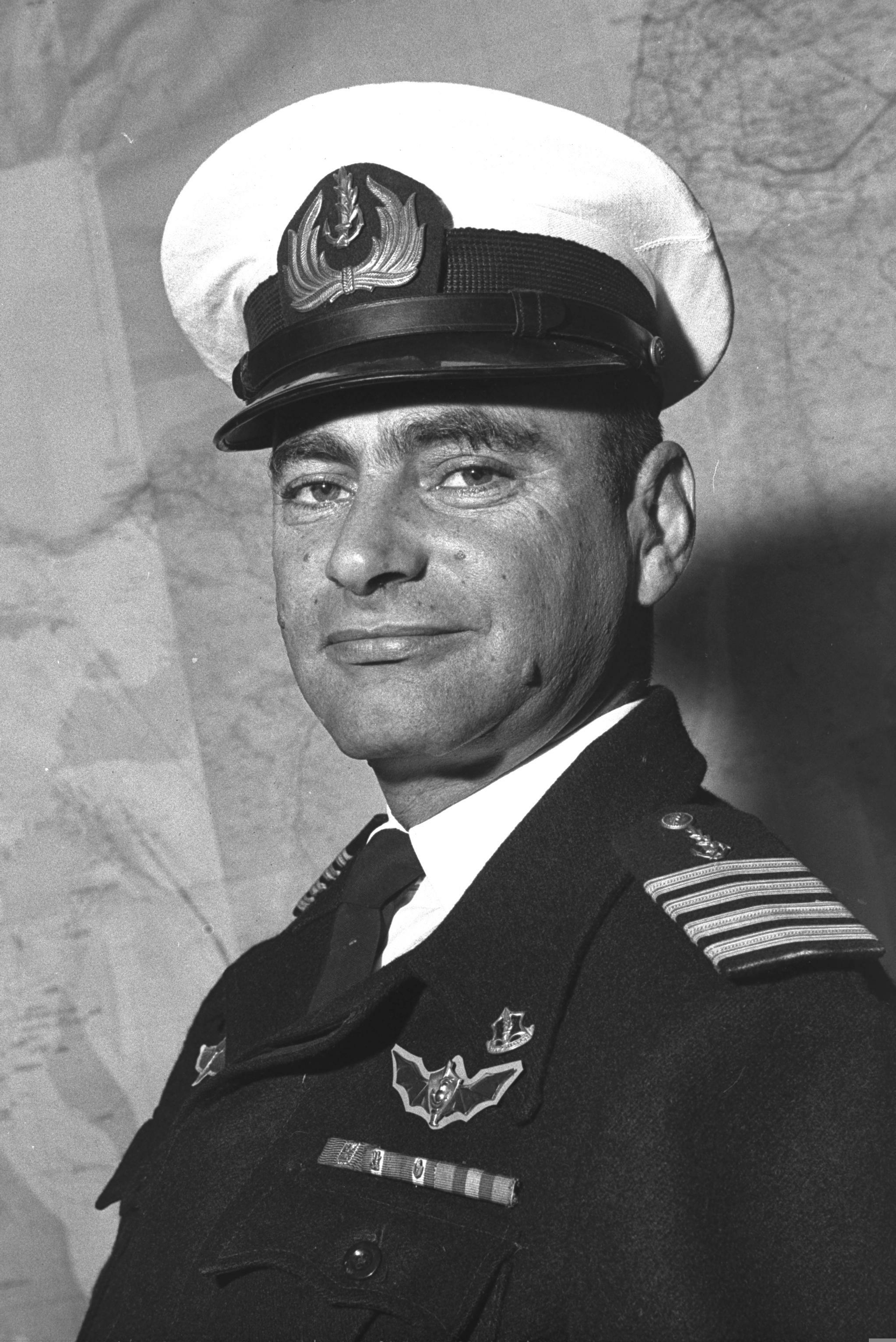
- Native name: יוחאי בן-נון
- Born: 17 December 1924; Haifa, Mandatory Palestine
- Died: 6 June 1994 (aged 69) New York City, New York, United States
- Allegiance: Israel
- Branch: Israeli Navy
- Rank: Aluf
- Commands: Shayetet 13, INS Yafo, Israeli Navy
- Conflicts: 1947–1949 Palestine war Sinai War; Six-Day War
- Awards: Hero of Israel
- Other work: Founder and Director General of Israel's Oceanographic and Limnological Research Ltd
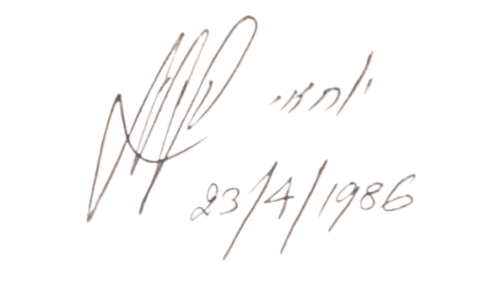
- Signature

Yohai Ben-Nun (Hebrew: יוחאי בן-נון; December 17, 1924 – June 6, 1994) was the sixth commander of the Israeli Navy, one of the founders of the Israeli Special Forces and a Hero of Israel.

== Biography ==
Yohai Ben-Nun born on December 17, 1924, in Haifa. His mother was born in Petah Tikva to a family of First Aliyah pioneers while his father was born in the Russian Empire and moved to Palestine at age 7. He spent his childhood in Jerusalem. At the age of 16 he enlisted in the Haganah. Ben-Nun joined the Palmach in 1941 and spent three years training and eventually rising to the rank of a squad leader. In 1944, he joined the Pal-Yam, the sea corps of the Palmach. He participated in a covert operation in 1945, in which two British boats were sunk.

At the outbreak of the 1948 Arab–Israeli War, he founded Shayetet 13, the Israeli naval commando unit. He commanded a force that sank the Egyptian Navy flagship, the Emir Farouk, in the Israeli naval campaign in Operation Yoav, for which he was awarded the Hero of Israel decoration. When it was replaced by the Medal of Valor, he was awarded the newer medal automatically.

Ben-Nun volunteered for an extremely risky mission. He was to ride an explosive boat (similar to an Italian MTM one) and aim it at the Egyptian sloop. Because the Egyptians would spot the boat and maneuver to avoid it, it had been decided that it would be guided by a volunteer sitting astride it. The volunteer would jump off at the very last moment—just 50–100 meters from the target. Even if Egyptian searchlights spotted the e-boat, it would be too late. Yohai and the boat were maneuvered as close as possible by rowboat before the e-boat was launched with Ben-Nun astride. His comrades began to row away after the explosion, but then they heard a voice and Ben-Nun appeared. Once on board the rowboat, he explained that the Egyptian searchlights had turned dark just as he got near enough to aim his boat and leap off.

Ben-Nun continued to serve in the Israeli Navy after the war. In the Sinai War, he served as the commander of the INS Yafo, taking part in the capture of an Egyptian destroyer. After the war, he returned to command Shayetet 13.

Ben-Nun was appointed the commander of the Israeli Navy in 1960, a position he used to create a larger fleet with a better attack capability.

Although he retired in 1966, during the Six-Day War Ben-Nun volunteered for service and fought in the naval operations and on the Golan Heights.

As a civilian, Ben-Nun founded a semi-governmental company, חקר ימים ואגמים בע״מ (Israel's Oceanographic and Limnological Research Ltd), for scientific research related to oceanographic and freshwater subjects. He was Director General from 1968 to 1982. After the Yom Kippur War, he joined the protesters who called for the resignation of the government.

Ben-Nun died on June 6, 1994, in New York City, and was buried in kibbutz Ma'agan Michael.

A marine research foundation, The Admiral Yohai Ben-Nun Foundation for Marine and Freshwater Research, was established in his name.
