= Arieh Atzmoni =

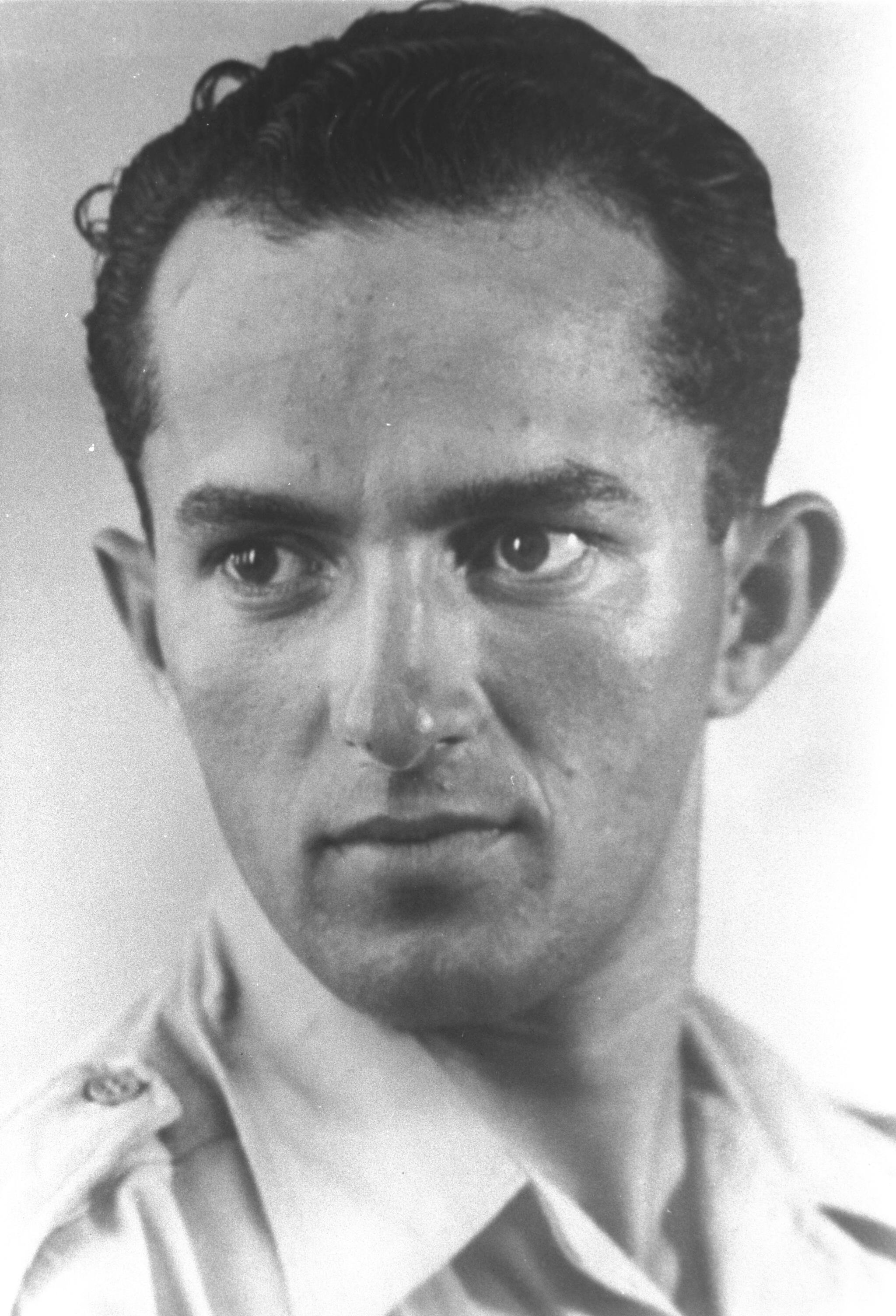
- Native name: אריה עצמוני
- Born: Leib Markowicz; 2 November 1926; Uzhhorod, Czechoslovakia (present day Ukraine)
- Died: 30 March 2005 (aged 78) Haifa, Israel
- Allegiance: Israel
- Conflicts: World War II; 1948 Arab–Israeli War; Six-Day War; War of Attrition; Yom Kippur War
- Awards: Hero of Israel

Arieh Atzmoni (born Leib Markowicz; Hebrew: אריה עצמוני; 2 November 1926 – 30 March 2005) was a Czech-born Israeli soldier and Hero of Israel.

== Early life ==
Atzmoni was born Leib Markowicz in Uzhhorod (then in Czechoslovakia, now in Ukraine). During World War II, when he was 13, he left his parents home and lived alone in Budapest. During the Holocaust, his mother and two younger sisters were murdered, while his father, brother and older sister were saved. Later, he was taken to a labor camp in Yugoslavia and worked in copper mining until he was liberated by local partisans, whom he joined in fighting the Germans until his immigration to Palestine in 1944 at age 18. Atzmoni wanted to join the military, but was concerned that his slim figure would cause him to be rejected, so he said he was two years older than he was.

== Military career ==
After immigrating to Palestine, Atzmoni joined the Jewish Settlement Police and dealt with Naharayim. Following an Arab Legion attack, he retreated with the guards and reached the nearby base of the 12th Battalion of the Golani Brigade. He joined the ranks of the brigade and after a sergeant course was stationed as a company sergeant and served in this position during the 1948 Arab–Israeli War. Later, he joined the Artillery Corps, where he served in the reserves for many years. In 1969, following a severe manpower shortage in the Israel Defense Forces, he responded to a request by its Chief of General Staff and returned for a year of voluntary service in the Artillery Corps.

=== Decorations ===
In September 1948, Atzmoni cleared a fire-focused ammunition box during battle and received a commendation from the brigade commander.

In January 1949, Atzmoni's unit was attacked near Rafah. A military car was blocking the artillery's line of sight, preventing an effective response. Atzmoni ran, under heavy fire, and was able to start the car and move it, thus clearing the way for the artillery to act and destroy 18 enemy vehicles. For this he was awarded the Hero of Israel commendation, which is the highest commendation ever awarded by the IDF, given to only twelve soldiers:

On January 4, 1949, in the battle for the cemetery in Rafah, our artillery car was stopped in the field and the entire sector was concealed in front of our cannon position. The enemy, which attacked tanks and armored vehicles accompanied by infantry, rained fire on the outpost and prevented any action to remove the car from the area. Lt. Col. Arieh Otzmany, whose job was to bring ammunition and digging equipment to the outpost, jumped at the car, managed to start it, and drove it from the front to the rear, enabling our anti-tank cannon to launch an operation that resulted in the use of nine tanks and other enemy vehicles.

== Later life and death ==
Following his discharge from the military, Atzmoni settled in the Hadar neighborhood in Haifa with his wife Lea (née Lustig), and worked as a cab driver. Concurrently, he imported and sold car parts. The two then established the Haifa branch of car rental company Hertz, which flourished. They then established their own car rental agency, which was also successful, allowing him donate some earnings to charity. After decades, the couple retired to the Ahuza retirement home. He died on March 30, 2005, and was buried in Haifa with a military ceremony. He had a son, daughter and four grandchildren.
