= Yosef Avni =

Irgun fighter (1924–2021)

- יוסף אבני
- Born: December 25, 1924
- Died: February 3, 2021
- Citizenship: Israel
- Occupation: Irgun fighter

Yosef Avni (Hebrew: יוסף אבני; December 25, 1924 - February 3, 2021) was an Irgun fighter. He was born Yosef Danoch in Jerusalem, British Mandate of Palestine, to Yemenite Jewish immigrants. He changed his name to Avni (his underground identity) after the establishment of the State of Israel in 1948.

Avni went to work as a locksmith at a young age, to help provide for his family (he learned his job at his cousins' workshop, the Sabah brothers). At the age of 16 he joined Betar, leaving four years later (in 1942) for the Irgun. After the declaration of the Revolt against the British authorities (February 1944), Avni became part of the fighting force, and on top of being in charge of an arms dump in Jerusalem took part in many operations.

Avni commanded the sappers unit during the second attack on the British intelligence offices in the Russian Compound in Jerusalem on December 27, 1945, in which the building was destroyed and seven British policemen and an Irgun fighter were killed. He also took part in the King David Hotel bombing, being one of the senior commanders of the operation, and the bombing of the British Army base at Camp Schneller, personally lighting the fuses on mines that the raiders had set.

Avni was arrested in 1947 and detained by the British in Latrun Camp. He was released in March 1948, and was wounded attacking the Muchtar's house during the events of the Deir Yassin massacre. During the 1948 Arab-Israeli War, he took part in Operation Kedem.
