= Siman-Tov Ganeh =

Israeli soldier (1924–1968)

- Native name: סימן-טוב גנה
- Born: May 5, 1924; Old City, Jerusalem, Palestine
- Died: March 6, 1968 (aged 44) Israel
- Buried: Jerusalem, Israel
- Allegiance: Royal Navy; Lehi; Israel Defense Forces
- Conflicts: World War II; 1948 Arab–Israeli War
- Awards: Hero of Israel

Siman-Tov Ganeh (Hebrew: סימן-טוב גנה; May 5, 1924 – March 6, 1968) was an Israeli soldier who was rewarded with the Hero of Israel.

== Biography ==
Siman-Tov Ganeh was born in the Old City of Jerusalem to a Georgian-Jewish family. His father was a veteran of the Jewish Legion. When the 1936–1939 Arab revolt broke out, his family was forced to leave the Old City and move to Zikhron Moshe. As a boy he worked in a cigarette factory. During World War II his father enlisted in the British Army and fell captive in Greece in 1941 while serving in the Auxiliary Military Pioneer Corps. Ganeh enlisted in the Royal Navy during the war and served on supply ships. In April 1946, he was discharged and worked as a taxi driver shortly before joining the Lehi underground movement.

Ganeh joined the Israel Defense Forces during the 1948 Arab-Israeli War and served in the 89th Battalion of the 8th Armored Brigade. In November 1948, he participated in the Battle of Iraq Suwaydan, in which he was wounded when a shell struck the half-track he was driving. After another half-track was hit, the unit began to withdraw. While badly wounded and under heavy fire, Ganeh provided first aid to the other wounded soldiers and returned fire with the half-track's machine gun, covering the unit's retreat. He remained with the other wounded men in the field for six hours and eventually managed to summon help with the half-track's radio. For his part in the operation, he was awarded the Hero of Israel medal.

After the battle, Siman-Tov's two legs were amputated and replaced with prosthetic legs. Following the war he studied carpentry and worked for a while as a taxi driver. He got married in 1950 and was a father of three. His middle son was named Ma'agan, after being born on the day Ganeh was saved from the Ma'agan disaster which he had witnessed. During the Six-Day War he volunteered to gather soldiers from transportation stations. In 1967, he began to work as a contractor in military camps. In March 1968, he was killed by an old shell that was ignited by heat. After his death, mourning orders were held in IDF units.
