= Moshe Gidron =

Moshe Gordon
- משה גדרון
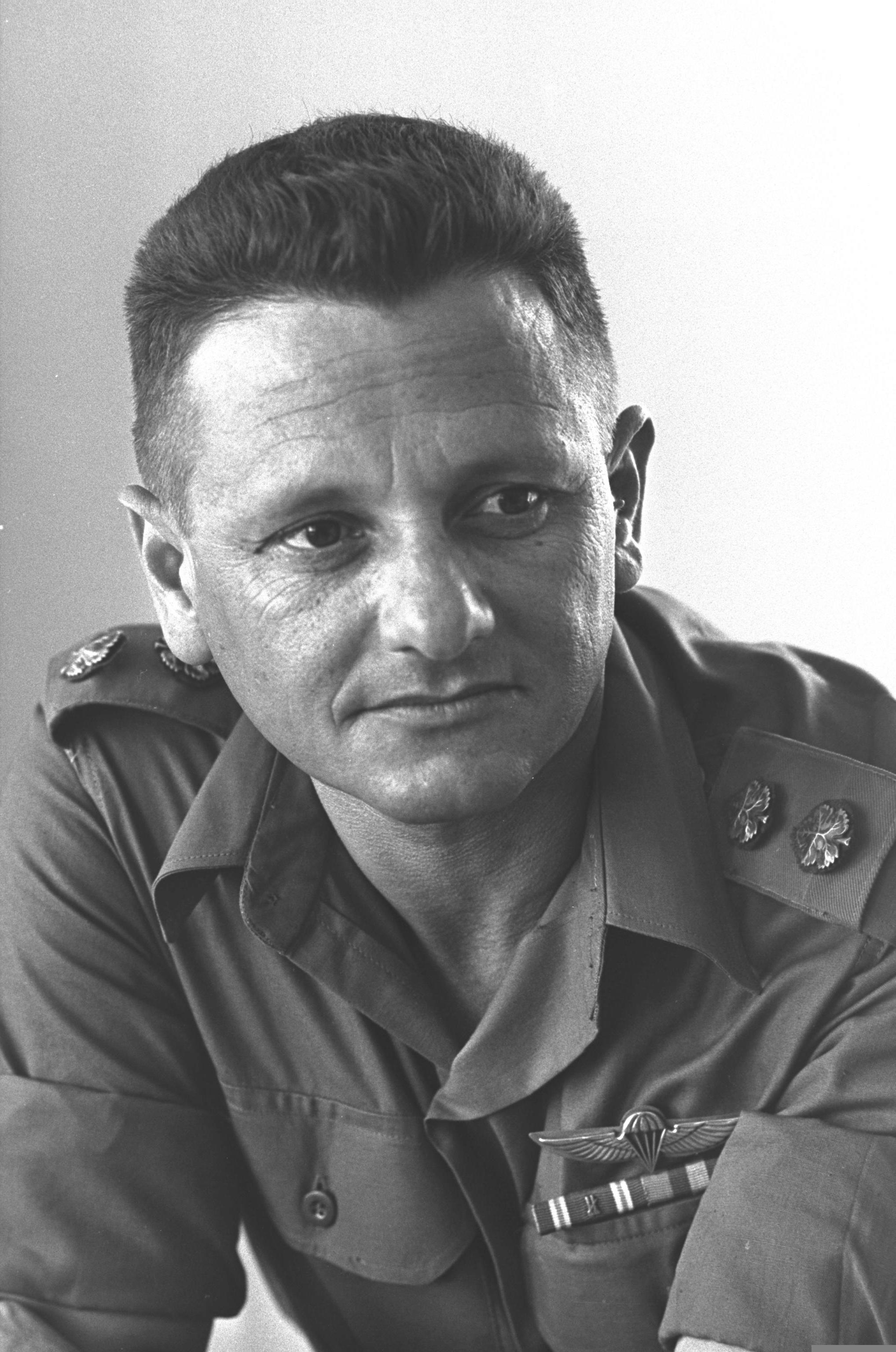
- Born: May 25, 1925; Tel Aviv, Israel
- Died: November 14, 2009 (aged 84); Israel
- Burial place: Ramat HaSharon
- Military career
- Allegiance: Israel
- Branch: Palmach; Israel Defense Forces
- Service years: 1942–1972; 1974–1976
- Rank: Aluf
- Conflicts: 1948 Arab–Israeli War; Six-Day War; Yom Kippur War

Moshe Gidron (Hebrew: משה גדרון; May 25, 1925 – November 14, 2009) was a major general in the Israel Defense Forces and former head of the Manpower Directorate.

== Early life ==
Gidron was born in Tel Aviv during the British Mandate of Palestine.

== Military career ==
At age 17, he joined Palmach as a wireless operator assisting Aliyah Bet ships. After the establishment of the state of Israel in 1948, he served as a communications officer in the Yiftach Brigade. He later served as chief communications officer of the Central Command and later in the Southern Command. During 1952–1953, he commanded the military training school for communications.

In 1966, he was made head of the Communications and Electronics Corps, serving in that capacity during the Six-Day War. He was discharged in 1972 as a Brigadier General, becoming CEO of the Koor Industries and Telrad telecommunications company.

Gidron returned to army service in April 1974, promoted to the rank of Major General (Aluf) as head of the IDF's Manpower Directorate. He held this position until 1976.

== Later life ==
Following his discharge, Gidron was appointed as Director General of the Ministry of Communications. In 1979, he was appointed as Israel's Consul General to Southwestern United States. Between the years 1988–2002, he was chief comptroller of the Israeli defense system.

In 1995, Gidron headed a commission to investigate the 300 lines affair concerning wiretapping.

== Personal life and death ==
Gidron's wife, Tamar, was the daughter of Dov Hoz. The couple had two sons and a daughter. One son, Ilan Gidron, was an IDF armored officer killed in action during the Yom Kippur War.

Gidron died in 2009 at age 84.
