= Hero of Israel =

Israeli military decoration

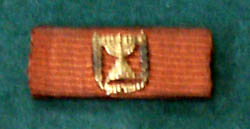
Hero of Israel

Hero of Israel (Hebrew: גיבור ישראל) is an Israeli military decoration that was awarded during the War of Independence. When the IDF was first established in May 1948, a system of decorations had not yet been instituted, but many soldiers who had distinguished themselves in battle were recommended by their officers for awards. The army command installed a committee to decide on a system of decorations, and a contest was written out for the public to design medals. However, after more than a year, no decisions had been taken and in the summer of 1949 it was decided that, as a "temporary solution", 12 decorations would be awarded to a selection of soldiers who were representative for the different IDF units and who had distinguished themselves by the highest level of heroism.

The award ceremony was held on July 17, 1949. After a military parade, Israeli President Chaim Weizmann, Prime Minister David Ben-Gurion and IDF Chief of Staff Yaakov Dori awarded the decoration to the recipients or their dependents (four awards were given posthumously).

After this ceremony, the committee continued to work on a system of decorations, but it was never brought to a solution and so the Hero of Israel ribbon was never awarded again. Instead, in 1970 it was replaced with the Medal of Valor. All recipients of the Hero of Israel automatically received the Medal of Valor as well.

== Design ==
The decoration is designed in the form of a red ribbon bar, charged with a clasp of the Israeli coat of arms made of gold.

== Recipients ==
| Photo | Name | Rank | Conflict | Place of action | Date of action | Notes |
|---|---|---|---|---|---|---|
| | Yair Racheli | Private | War of Independence | Near Shefa-'Amr | 19 Jan 1948 | Received the medal for destroying an enemy position |
| | Emmanuel Landau | Private | War of Independence | Kiryat Motzkin | 17 Mar 1948 | Received the medal for capturing an enemy supply truck |
| | Abraham Avigdorov | Private | War of Independence | Kiryat Motzkin | 17 Mar 1948 | Received the medal for destroying two enemy Bren machine gun positions |
| | Zerubavel Horowitz | Second Lieutenant | War of Independence | Road to Jerusalem | 27 Mar 1948 | Received the medal for covering the retreat of his comrades from an enemy attack |
| | Yizhar Armoni | Private | War of Independence | Nabi Yusha | 20 Apr 1948 | Received the medal for covering the retreat of his comrades and evacuation of wounded soldiers |
| | Emil Brig | Sergeant | War of Independence | Kibbutz Gesher area | 14 May 1948 | Received the medal for blowing up a bridge and thus preventing the enemy from advancing |
| | Zvi Zibel | Airman | War of Independence | Ben Shemen | 25 Jun 1948 | Received the medal for delivering supplies to the besieged Ben Shemen while under heavy enemy fire |
| | Ben-Zion Leitner | Private First Class | War of Independence | Iraq Suwaydan | 19 Oct 1948 | Received the medal for destroying enemy bunkers during the Battles of the Separation Corridor |
| | Ron Feller | Sergeant | War of Independence | Karatiyya | 19 Jul 1948 | Received the medal for destroying an enemy tank in the Battle of Karatiyya |
| | Yohai Ben-Nun | Captain | War of Independence | Mediterranean Sea | 22 Oct 1948 | Received the medal for sinking the Egyptian Navy flagship |
| | Siman-Tov Ganeh | Private | War of Independence | Iraq Suwaydan | 9 Nov 1948 | Received the medal for covering the retreat of his comrades |
| | Arieh Atzmoni | Master Sergeant | War of Independence | Rafah | 4 Nov 1948 | Received the medal for rescuing a cannon from enemy hands |
