= Zvi Zibel =

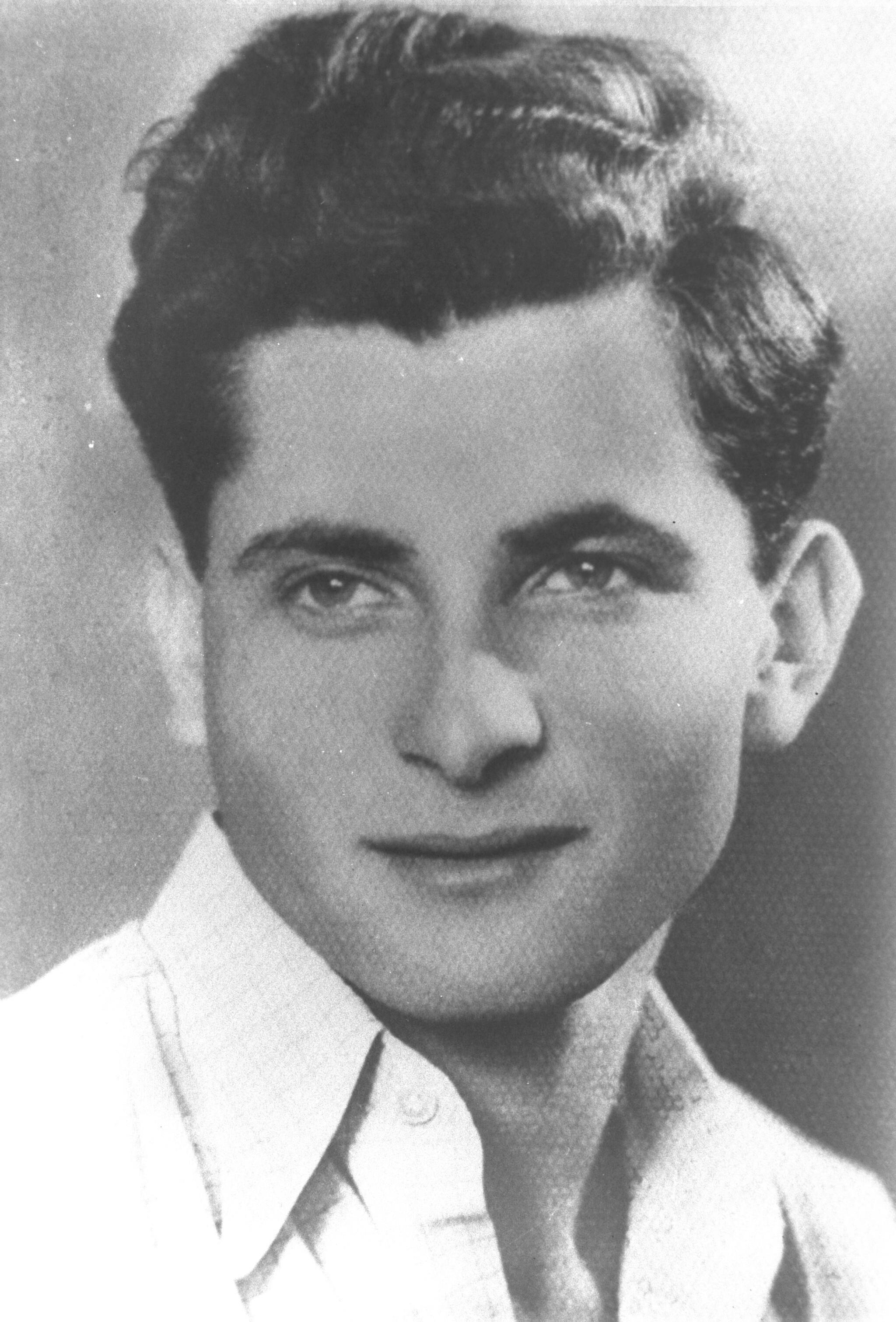
- Native name: צבי זיבל
- Nickname: Chibi
- Born: November 29, 1925; Tel Aviv, Mandatory Palestine
- Died: December 28, 1948 (aged 23) near Nitzana, Israel
- Buried: Givatayim, Israel
- Allegiance: IDF
- Conflicts: Jewish insurgency in Mandatory Palestine; 1948 Arab–Israeli War
- Awards: Hero of Israel

Zvi Zibel (Hebrew: צבי זיבל; November 29, 1925 – December 28, 1948) was an IDF soldier who died during the 1948 Arab–Israeli War.

== Biography ==
Zvi, son of Sarah and Abraham, was born in Tel Aviv and at a young age was sent to study at the Ben Shemen Youth Village. He was later accepted to the agricultural school in Givat HaShlosha. In his youth he learned to play piano, guitar and the flute.

At the age of 18, Zibel joined the ranks of the Palmach and participated in the attack on the British police in Sarona and the absorption of the Wingate. During this period, he was arrested and imprisoned in Jerusalem. Zvi was trained as an aviator on the brink of the 1948 War.

On the flight to Ben Shemen, besieged on June 25, 1948, he landed his plane for the supply of ammunition. After landing the aircraft in the area, he worked under heavy fire to protect the aircraft from bullet wounds and to enable his return by driving a tractor loaded with sandbags to serve as a defensive wall. For this he was awarded, after his death, the Hero of Israel award.

In the fierce battles over Gush Etzion he participated in bombing and shooting a Bren from the air. In these operations he was hit and wounded by gunfire, but continued to fight. At the end of the campaign he was chosen as a commander of an aviation base and then spent a few months training in Czechoslovakia. A week after his return, he participated in Operation Horev, during which he toured the Nitzana area and lowered the altitude of a flight to help another plane. At this stage he was hit by four Egyptian fighter jets and killed with his flight partner.
