= Ethiopian Jews in Israel =

Jews who came from Ethiopia to the State of Israel

Total population
- 177,600(2024); About 2.3% of the Israeli Jewish population, about 1.75% of the total Israeli population

Languages
- Hebrew · Amharic · Tigrinya

Religion
- Haymanot and Rabbinic Judaism

Related ethnic groups
- Falash Mura · Beta Abraham

Ethiopian Jews in Israel or Beta Israel are immigrants and descendants of the immigrants from the Beta Israel communities in Ethiopia. To a lesser extent, the Ethiopian Jewish community in Israel also includes Falash Mura, a community of Beta Israel who had converted to Christianity over the course of the prior two centuries, but were permitted to immigrate to Israel upon returning to Israelite religion—this time largely to Rabbinic Judaism.

Most of the community made aliyah in two waves of mass immigration assisted by the Israeli government: Operation Moses (1984), and Operation Solomon (1991). Today, Israel is home to the largest Beta Israel community in the world, with about 177,600 citizens of Ethiopian descent in 2024, who mainly reside in southern and central Israel.

== History ==
=== First wave (1934–1960) ===
The first Ethiopian Jews who settled in Israel in modern times came in 1934 along with the Yemenite Jews from Italian Eritrea.

=== Second wave: (1961–1975) ===
Between 1963 and 1975, a relatively small group of Beta Israel moved to Israel. They were mainly men who had come to Israel on a tourist visa, and then remained in the country.

In 1973, Israel's Sephardi Chief Rabbi Ovadia Yosef, cited a rabbinic ruling of the Radbaz, Rabbi Azriel Hildesheimer, and two former Ashkenazic chief rabbis of Israel, Abraham Isaac Kook and Isaac Yitzhak HaLevi Herzog, declaring the Beta Yisrael Jews according to Halachah. He said: "It is our duty to redeem them from assimilation, to hasten their immigration to Israel, to educate them in the spirit of our holy Torah and to make them partners in the building of our sacred land....I am certain that the government institutions and the Jewish Agency, as well as organizations in Israel and the Diaspora, will help us to the best of our ability in this holy task..., the Mitzvah of redeeming the souls of our people...for everyone who saves one soul in Israel, it is as though he had saved the whole world. In 1974, Ashkenazi Rabbi Shlomo Goren also ruled that the Ethiopian Jews are a part of the Jewish people and this had already been established by Chief Rabbi Abraham Isaac Kook.

In April 1975, the Israeli government of Yitzhak Rabin officially accepted the Beta Israel as Jews for the purpose of the Law of Return (which grants all Jews the right to immigrate to Israel).

From 1975 onwards, the majority of the Ethiopian Jews made aliyah under the 1950 Law of Return. Several undercover rescue missions were organized by activists and Mossad agents to get them out of Ethiopia.

=== Third wave: (1975–1990) ===
==== Operation Brothers ====
Migration map of Beta Israel

- November 1979 – 1983: Aliyah activists and agents in Sudan, including Ferede Aklum, urged the Beta Israel to come to Sudan where they would be taken to Israel via Europe. Jewish Ethiopian refugees from the Ethiopian Civil War in the mid-1970s began to arrive at the refugee camps in Sudan. Most Beta Israel came from Tigray, which was then controlled by the TPLF, which often escorted them to the Sudanese border. Many chose to immigrate to Israel at this time to flee the civil war, the specter of famine during and after the war, and the hostility faced by Ethiopian Jews. In 1981, the Jewish Defense League protested what it felt was "lack of action" in rescuing the Ethiopian Jews by taking over the main offices of HIAS in Manhattan.
- 1983 – March 28, 1985: This immigration wave was in part motivated by word of mouth reports. In 1983, the governor of Gondar region, Major Melaku Teferra, was ousted as governor and his successor removed restrictions on travel. Beta Israel began to arrive in large numbers and due to poor conditions in the camps, refugees began dying of disease and hunger. It is estimated that between 2,000 and 5,000 were Beta Israel. In late 1984, the Sudanese government, following the intervention of the United States, allowed 7,200 Beta Israel to leave for Europe. They immediately flew from there to Israel. The first of two operations during this period was Operation Moses (original name: "The Lion of Judah's Cub"), which took place between November 20, 1984, and January 20, 1985, during which time 6,500 people immigrated to Israel. A few weeks later, the U.S. Air Force evacuated the 494 Beta Israel refugees remaining in Sudan to Israel in Operation Joshua. The second operation was mainly carried out due to the intervention and international pressure of the United States.

=== Fourth wave (1990–1999) ===
- 1991 (Operation Solomon): In 1991, the political and economic stability of Ethiopia deteriorated as rebels mounted attacks against, and eventually controlled, the capital city of Addis Ababa. Worried about the fate of the Beta Israel during the transition period, the Israeli government, together with several private groups, secretly prepared escape plans. Over the course of 36 hours, a total of 34 El Al passenger planes, with their seats removed to maximize passenger capacity, flew 14,325 Beta Israel directly to Israel. Dr. Rick Hodes, an American doctor working in Ethiopia, was the medical director for Operation Solomon.
- 1992–1999: In the years following Operation Solomon, smaller and more gradual waves of migration continued. These included the Qwara Beta Israel, a subgroup residing in the northwestern Ethiopian region of Qwara, many of whom had been previously left behind. With the assistance of the Jewish Agency and Israeli government, most members of this community were brought to Israel by the end of the decade.

=== Falash Mura (1993–present) ===
- 1993–present: From 1993 onwards, an irregular emigration began of Falash Mura, which was and still is mainly subjected to political developments in Israel. These immigrants are required to convert from Christianity to Judaism.
- 2018: In August 2018, the Netanyahu government vowed to bring in 1,000 Falasha Jews from Ethiopia.
- 2019: In April 2019, an estimated 8,000 Falasha were waiting to leave Ethiopia.
- 2020: On February 25, 2020, 43 Falasha arrived in Israel from Ethiopia.
- 29 November 2020 - 12 July 2023: Operation Tzur Israel (Rock of Israel). The operation was implemented in two phases with the goal of facilitating the immigration of 5,000 Ethiopian Jews to Israel, most of whom had close relatives already living there. The first phase, which ran from 28 November 2020 until March 15, 2021, brought 2,000 Ethiopian immigrants to Israel. The second phase, which began on June 2, 2022, brought another 3,000 immigrants, and concluded on 12 July 2023.
  - 2021:
    - March 11: Operation Tzur Israel brings 300 Ethiopian Jews to Israel.
    - March 15: The first phase of the operation concludes, with 2,000 immigrants brought to Israel.
    - November 28: The Israeli government approves the resumption of immigration for the remainder of the community from Ethiopia.
  - 2022:
    - February 2: The Israeli Supreme Court issues an interim order halting the immigration of 3,000 Ethiopians with close relatives in Israel, while hearing an appeal alleging many of them had faked their claims of Jewish ancestry.
    - March 15: The Court lifts the interim order.
    - June 1: Second phase of operation begins with an airlift of 181 immigrants.
  - 2023:
    - July 12: Operation Tzur Israel concludes with a final flight of 130 immigrants.
  - 2024:
    - In April 2024 61 Ethiopian Jews made Aliyah sponsored by ICEJ.
    - As of April 2024, the president of the aid group Struggle to Save Ethiopian Jewry (SSEJ) estimated that some 13,000 people were still waiting.
    - In response to a ruling from the Sahedrin calling on all Jews in galat to go up to Israel, a letter of 30 December 2024 from rement of Jews in Sudan and Ethiopia who have declared their willingness to go up to Israel
  - 2025:
    - Jewish Population in Ethiopia is 100
    - As recently as September 2025, Israel approved plans for the immigration of an additional 2,000 Ethiopian Jews, bringing hope to some of the families still waiting.
    - September 2025 7,000 [estimated in Ethiopia] This figure was cited in a September 2025 op-ed in The Jerusalem Post, based on "official estimates". Another Jerusalem Post piece mentioned "roughly 7,000" waiting as of that month.
    - According to the World Jewish Congress website: "Aliya: Since 1948, 50,700 Ethiopian Jews have emigrated to Israel"

== Integration and socioeconomic status ==
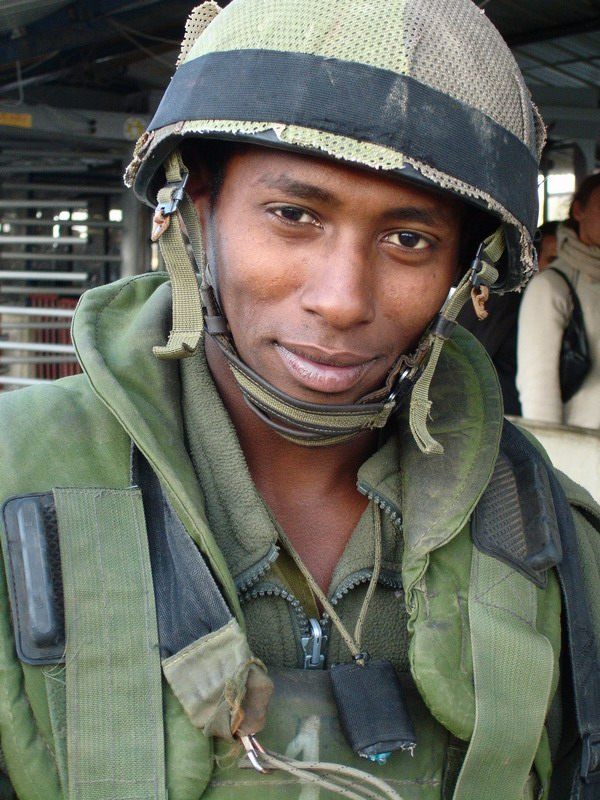
Beta Israel soldier in Nablus, 2006

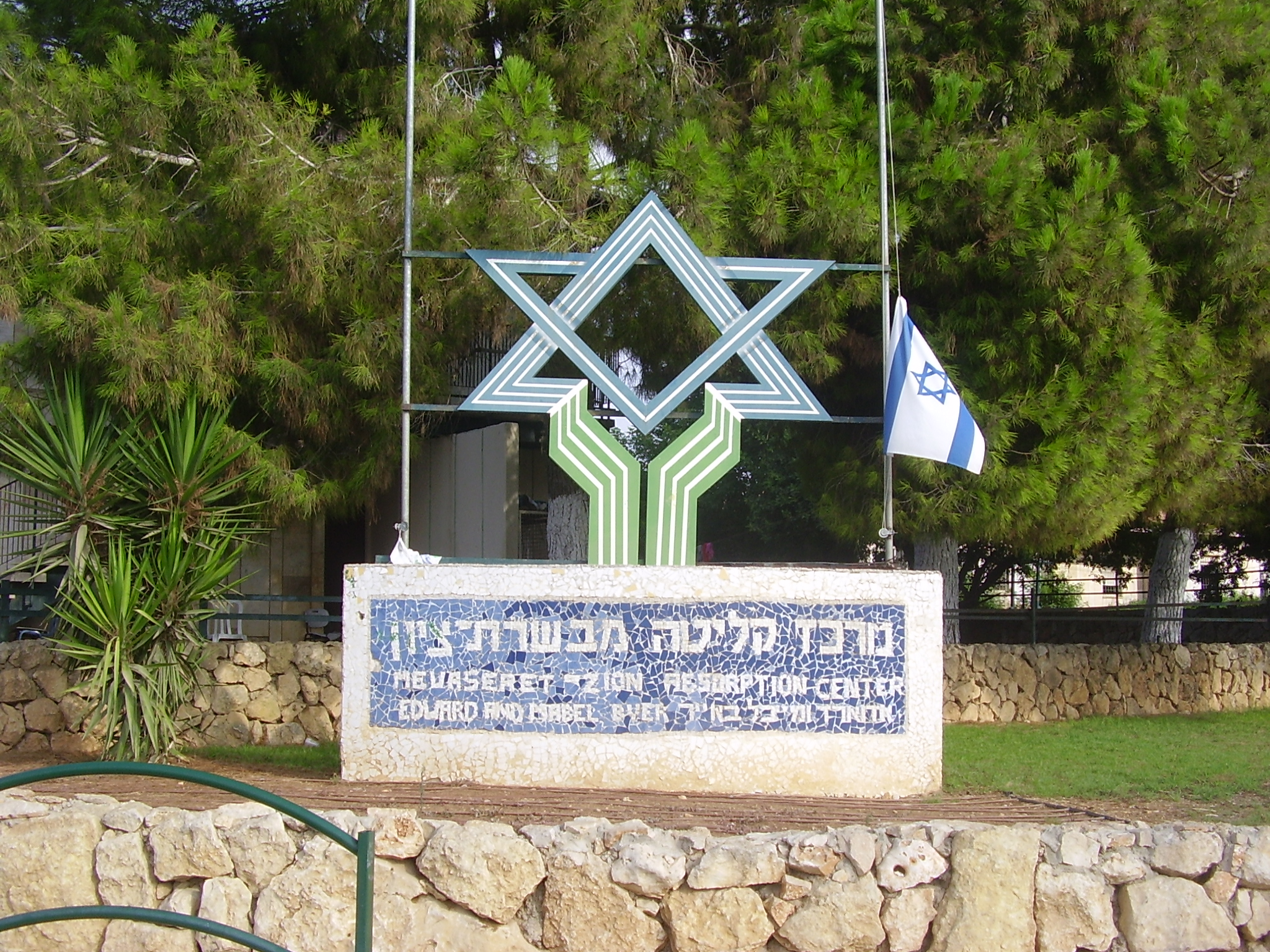
The entrance to Mevaseret Zion Absorption Center, 2010

The integration of the Ethiopian Beta Israel community into Israeli society initially involved significant socioeconomic and educational challenges. Many immigrants arrived with relatively low levels of formal education and came from rural areas of Ethiopia, making the abrupt transition to a developed and industrialized society particularly difficult. Although disparities with the wider Israeli Jewish population still remain, they have been narrowing as educational attainment and other socioeconomic indicators continue to improve. Various programs, including the Ministry of Education’s “New Way” initiative, have sought to further narrow these gaps.

One area in which substantial progress has been recorded is Bagrut attainment among students of Ethiopian descent. In the 2023/24 school year, 93.7% of 12th-grade students of Ethiopian descent took the matriculation exams, compared with 95.1% of students in the Hebrew education system overall. In the same year, the rate of eligibility for Bagrut certificates among students of Ethiopian descent equaled the rate among all Hebrew speakers for the first time, after a cumulative increase of 12.5% since 2017/18.

In the 2023/24 school year, The rate of eligibility for bagrut that meets the threshold requirements of the universities among 12th grade students of Ethiopian descent was 60.7% compared to 76.1% in the Hebrew education system overall (excluding ultra-Orthodox supervision) and 52.9% in the Arab education sector. the percentage of students of Ethiopian descent eligible for a matriculation certificate that meets university entrance requirements has also been increasing in recent years, and the gap between them and the general Hebrew-speaking students has narrowed from 25.1 percentage points in 2019/20 to 15.4 percentage points in 2023/24. this gap is still high in comparison to the gap in bagrut eligibility.

There has also been substantial growth in the identification of Ethiopian-origin students through national screening for gifted and excellence programs. In 2024, 349 second-grade students of Ethiopian descent were identified, more than four times the number recorded in 2020. This brought their representation near or at their share of the Hebrew education system.

The number of students of Ethiopian origin studying at institutions of higher education has been increasing in recent years: from 3,194 in 2016/17 to 4,144 in 2023/24, an increase of 29.7%. In general, the student population increased by 3.9% – from 227,700 in 2016/17 to 235,500 in 2023/24. The percentage of women among Ethiopian students was higher than the corresponding percentage among the general Hebrew speaking student population .

In 2019 The net income per household among Israelis of Ethiopian descent amounted to 14,027 NIS compared to 17,779 NIS for all Jewish households and 11,810 NIS for Arab households.

Before the mass aliyot of the 1980s and 1990s, small groups of Beta Israel had already moved to Israel in the 1950s as part of educational exchanges, and in trickles in the following decades. After Rabbi Ovadia Yosef’s 1973 halachic ruling, the Israeli government formally recognized them as eligible for aliyah under the Law of Return.

In preparation for the absorption of tens of thousands, the Ministry of Immigrant Absorption issued two detailed Master Plans: in 1985 (after Operation Moses) and 1991 (following Operation Solomon). These plans addressed housing, education, employment, and social services, but a strong assimilationist bias and inadequate cultural adaptation led to mixed outcomes.

== Involvement in politics ==
The first Ethiopian-born Knesset member to serve in the 14th Knesset was Addisu Masala, representing the Labor Party. He was previously a member of the Marxist Ethiopian People's Revolutionary Party organization in Ethiopia, and in Israel he became a Knesset member in the 1996 elections.

In 2012, Israel appointed the country's first Ethiopian-born ambassador, Beylanesh Zevadiahe. This was followed in 2020 by the appointment of Pnina Tamano-Shata to the post of Minister of Aliyah and Integration in the 35th Israeli government, as the first Ethiopian-born government minister.

== Language ==
The main language used for communication among Israeli citizens and amongst the Ethiopian Beta Israel in Israel is Modern Hebrew. The majority of the Beta Israel immigrants continue to speak in Amharic (primarily) and Tigrinya at home with their family members and friends. The Amharic language and the Tigrinya language are written in the Ge'ez script, originally developed for the Ge'ez language.

== Relations with Ethiopia ==
Although some non-Jewish Ethiopians expressed bitterness towards Beta Israel emigration, the Ethiopian Jews have maintained close cultural and historical ties with the broader Ethiopian society and traditions.

The Ethiopian government is also an important ally of Israel internationally, with ongoing cooperation in diplomatic, security, and development fields. Israel frequently dispatches technical and humanitarian teams to assist development initiatives in Ethiopia. Strategically, Israel “has always aspired to protect itself by means of a non-Arab belt that has included at various times Iran, Turkey, and Ethiopia", forming a key part of its regional security doctrine.

== Demography ==
The following is a list of the most significant Beta Israel population centers in Israel, as of 2006:

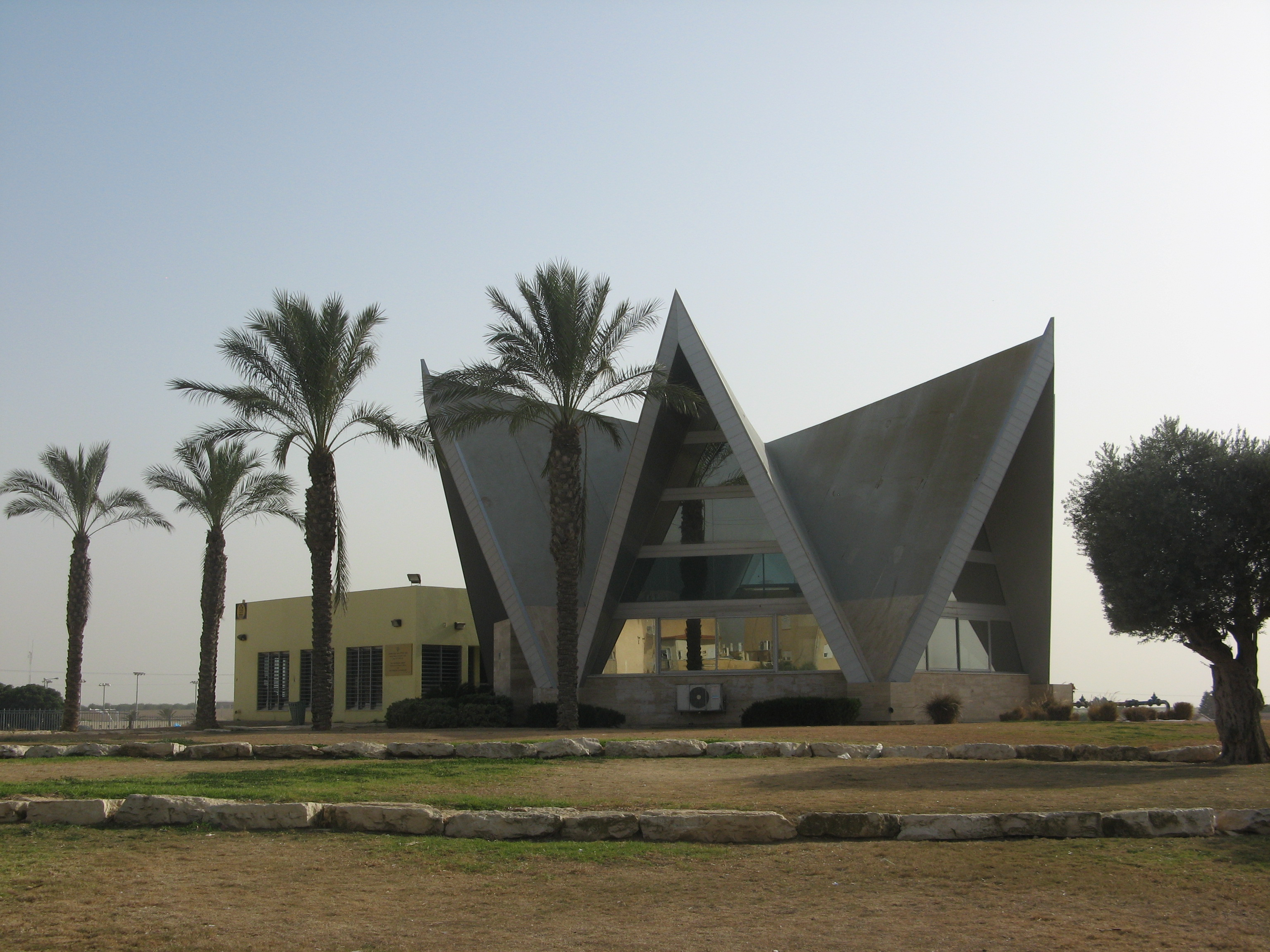
Ethiopian Beta Israel Synagogue in Netivot.

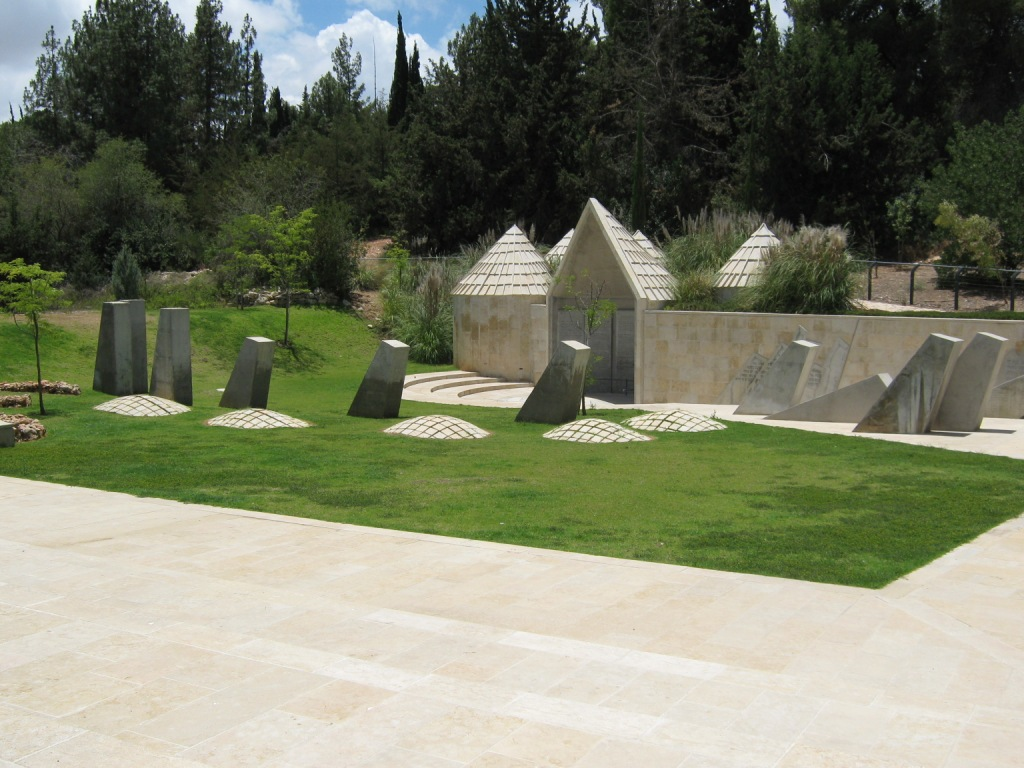
The official memorial site to the memory of Ethiopian Beta Israel (Ethiopian Jews), who died in their way to Israel on Mount Herzl.

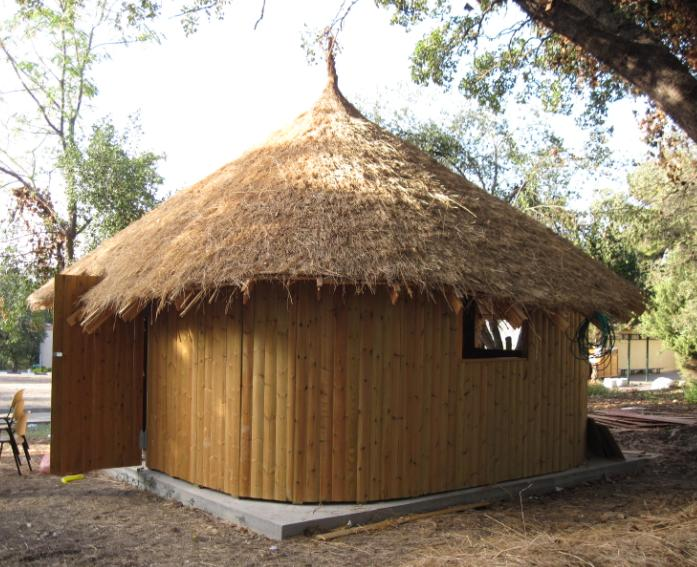
Gojo in Kfar HaNoar HaDati, Kfar Hasidim.

| Rank | City | Total population | Beta Israel population | % of City Pop |
|---|---|---|---|---|
| 1 | Netanya | 173,000 | 10,200 | 5.9 |
| 2 | Beersheba | 185,443 | 6,216 | 3.4 |
| 3 | Ashdod | 204,153 | 6,191 | 3.0 |
| 4 | Rehovot | 104,545 | 6,179 | 5.9 |
| 5 | Haifa | 266,280 | 5,484 | 2.1 |
| 6 | Ashkelon | 107,759 | 5,132 | 4.8 |
| 7 | Rishon LeZion | 222,041 | 5,004 | 2.3 |
| 8 | Hadera | 76,332 | 4,828 | 6.3 |
| 9 | Jerusalem | 733,329 | 4,526 | 0.6 |
| 10 | Petah Tikva | 184,196 | 4,041 | 2.2 |
| 11 | Kiryat Malakhi | 19,519 | 3,372 | 17.3 |
| 12 | Ramla | 64,172 | 3,297 | 5.1 |
| 13 | Lod | 66,776 | 3,176 | 4.8 |
| 14 | Afula | 39,274 | 3,123 | 8.0 |
| 15 | Kiryat Gat | 47,794 | 3,062 | 6.4 |
| 16 | Beit Shemesh | 69,482 | 2,470 | 3.6 |
| 17 | Yavne | 31,884 | 2,102 | 6.6 |
| 18 | Kiryat Yam | 37,201 | 1,672 | 4.5 |
| 19 | Bat Yam | 129,437 | 1,502 | 1.2 |
| 20 | Safed | 28,094 | 1,439 | 5.1 |
| 21 | Gedera | 15,462 | 1,380 | 8.9 |
| 22 | Pardes Hanna-Karkur | 29,835 | 1,333 | 4.5 |
| 23 | Netivot | 24,919 | 1,217 | 4.9 |
| 24 | Be'er Ya'akov | 9,356 | 1,039 | 11.1 |
| 25 | Ness Ziona | 30,951 | 986 | 3.2 |
| 26 | Tel Aviv | 384,399 | 970 | 0.3 |
| 27 | Or Yehuda | 31,255 | 903 | 2.9 |
| 28 | Migdal HaEmek | 24,705 | 882 | 3.6 |
| 29 | Holon | 167,080 | 825 | 0.5 |
| 30 | Yokneam Illit | 18,453 | 772 | 4.2 |
| 31 | Kiryat Motzkin | 39,707 | 769 | 1.9 |
| 32 | Kiryat Ekron | 9,900 | 735 | 7.4 |
| 34 | Karmiel | 44,108 | 667 | 1.5 |
| 35 | Kfar Saba | 81,265 | 665 | 0.8 |
| 36 | Tirat Carmel | 18,734 | 635 | 3.4 |
| 37 | Arad | 23,323 | 602 | 2.6 |
| 38 | Ofakim | 24,447 | 598 | 2.4 |
| 39 | Nazareth Illit | 43,577 | 596 | 1.4 |
| 40 | Kiryat Bialik | 36,497 | 524 | 1.4 |
| 41 | Sderot | 19,841 | 522 | 2.6 |
| 42 | Ma'ale Adumim | 31,754 | 506 | 1.6 |
| 43 | Gan Yavne | 15,826 | 501 | 3.2 |
| 44 | Tiberias | 39,996 | 483 | 1.2 |
| 45 | Bnei Brak | 147,940 | 461 | 0.3 |
| 46 | Rosh HaAyin | 37,453 | 424 | 1.1 |
| 47 | Kfar Yona | 14,118 | 413 | 2.9 |
| 48 | Ra'anana | 72,832 | 385 | 0.5 |
| 49 | Kiryat Ata | 49,466 | 350 | 0.7 |
| 50 | Eilat | 46,349 | 331 | 0.7 |
| 51 | Nahariya | 50,439 | 309 | 0.6 |
| 52 | Herzliya | 84,129 | 271 | 0.3 |
| 53 | Beit She'an | 16,432 | 230 | 1.4 |
| 54 | Hod HaSharon | 44,567 | 210 | 0.5 |
| 55 | Yehud-Monosson | 25,464 | 172 | 0.7 |
| 56 | Nesher | 21,246 | 166 | 0.8 |
| 57 | Even Yehuda | 9,711 | 163 | 1.7 |
| 58 | Ofra | 2,531 | 131 | 5.2 |
| 59 | Kedumim | 3,208 | 104 | 3.2 |
| 60 | Ramat Gan | 129,658 | 101 | 0.1 |

The city of Kiryat Malakhi has a large concentration of Ethiopian Beta Israel, with 17.3% of the town's population being members of the Beta Israel as of 2006. This proportion would slightly decline to 16% by 2019. Southern towns, including Qiryat Gat, Kiryat Malakhi, Be'er Sheva, Yavne, Ashkelon, Rehovot, Kiryat Ekron, and Gedera have significant Ethiopian Jewish populations.

Table - The Population of Ethiopian Origin at the End of 2022, in Main Localities

The following is a list of the most significant Beta Israel population centers in Israel in localities above 2,000 people, as of 2022, which account for 77.5% of the group's population.

| Locality | Total population (thousands) | Total Population of Ethiopian origin (thousands) | Population of Ethiopian origin out of total population (%) |
|---|---|---|---|
| National Total | 9,662.0 | 168.8 | 1.7 |
| Netanya | 233.1 | 12.2 | 5.2 |
| Be’er Sheva | 214.2 | 10.3 | 4.8 |
| Rishon LeZiyyon | 260.5 | 9.6 | 3.7 |
| Ashqelon | 153.1 | 9.0 | 5.9 |
| Petah Tikva | 255.4 | 8.9 | 3.5 |
| Rehovot | 150.7 | 7.7 | 5.1 |
| Ashdod | 226.8 | 7.5 | 3.3 |
| Qiryat Gat | 64.4 | 7.5 | 11.6 |
| Jerusalem | 981.7 | 6.6 | 0.7 |
| Hadera | 103.0 | 6.2 | 6.0 |
| Haifa | 290.3 | 5.8 | 2.0 |
| Bet Shemesh | 154.7 | 4.6 | 3.0 |
| Ramla | 79.1 | 4.5 | 5.7 |
| Lod | 85.4 | 4.4 | 5.1 |
| Afula | 61.5 | 3.9 | 6.4 |
| Qiryat Mal’akhi | 25.7 | 3.9 | 15.1 |
| Yavne | 56.2 | 3.8 | 6.7 |
| Tel Aviv-Yafo | 474.5 | 2.7 | 0.6 |
| Holon | 198.0 | 2.7 | 1.3 |
| Bat Yam | 128.5 | 2.6 | 2.0 |
| Netivot | 46.4 | 2.3 | 5.0 |
| Qiryat Yam | 41.1 | 2.1 | 5.2 |
| Safed | 38.0 | 2.1 | 5.4 |

(1) Localities with 2,000 or more residents of Ethiopian origin

Population of Ethiopian Origin by District, 2022
| District | Ethiopian Israeli residents | % of total Ethiopian Israeli population |
|---|---|---|
| Central | 62,361 | 36.9% |
| South | 44,576 | 26.4% |
| Haifa | 23,543 | 13.9% |
| North | 12,235 | 7.3% |
| Jerusalem | 11,800 | 7.0% |
| Tel Aviv | 10,689 | 6.4% |
| West Bank* | 3,461 | 2.1% |
| Total | 166,845 | 100.0% |

*Referred to as Judea & Samaria in the report.

== Controversy ==
=== Discrimination ===
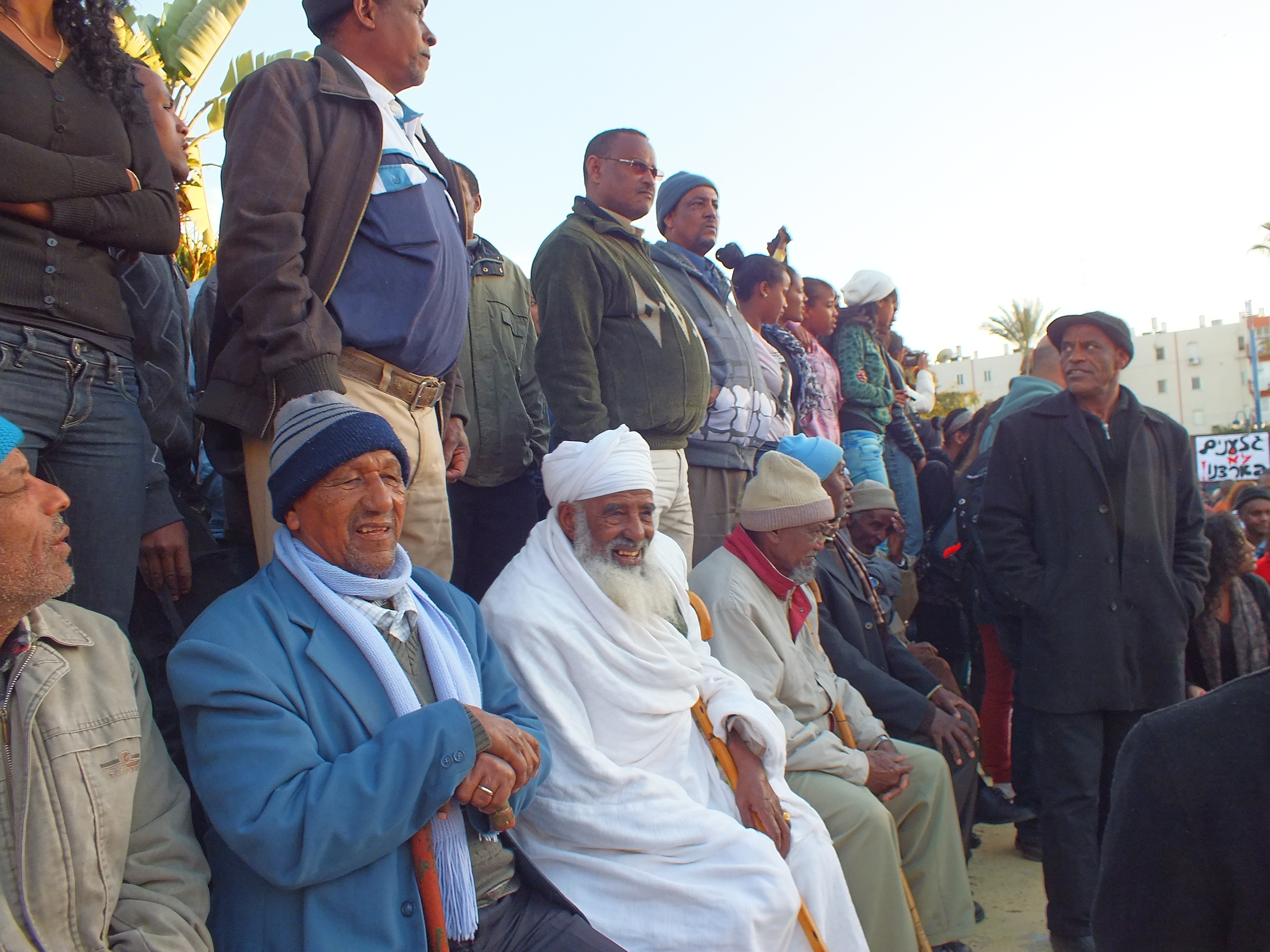
Men attending a demonstration against racism and discrimination, 2012

In May 2015, The Jewish Daily Forward described the Ethiopian Jewish community in Israel as one that has "long complained of discrimination, racism, and poverty". The absorption of Ethiopians in Israeli society represents an ambitious attempt to deny the significance of race. Israeli authorities, aware of the situation of most African diaspora communities in other Western countries, hosted programs to avoid setting in patterns of discrimination. The Ethiopian Beta Israel community's internal challenges have been complicated by perceived racist attitudes in some sectors of Israeli society and the establishment.

In 2005, racism was alleged when the mayor of Or Yehuda refused to accept a large increase in Ethiopian immigrants due to fear of having the property of the town decrease in value or having an increase in crime.

Demonstrations in Israel have occurred protesting the alleged racism against Ethiopian immigrants.

=== Protests against police brutality ===
In April 2015, an Ethiopian IDF soldier was the victim of an unprovoked and allegedly racist attack by an Israeli policeman and the attack was caught on video. The soldier, Damas Pakedeh, was arrested and then released, after being accused of attacking the policeman. Pakadeh is an orphan who emigrated from Ethiopia with his siblings in 2008. He believes the incident was racially motivated, and that, if the video had not been taken, he would have been punished. Instead, the police officer and volunteer were suspended pending an investigation. Likud MK Avraham Neguise called on National Police Chief Yohanan Danino to prosecute the police officer and volunteer, saying they engaged in "a gross violation of the basic law of respecting others and their liberty by those who are supposed to protect us". The Jerusalem Post notes that in 2015, "there have been a series of reports in the Israeli press about alleged acts of police brutality against Ethiopian Israelis, with many in the community saying they are unfairly targeted and treated more harshly than other citizens".

The incident of police brutality with Pakedeh and alleged brutality of officials from Israel's Administration of Border Crossings, Population, and Immigration with Walla Bayach, an Israeli of Ethiopian descent, brought the Ethiopian community to protest. Hundreds of Ethiopians participated in protests the streets of Jerusalem on April 20, 2015, to decry what they view as "rampant racism" and violence in Israel directed at their community. Israel Police Commissioner Yohanan Danino met with representatives of the Israeli Ethiopian community that day following the recent violent incidents involving police officers and members of the community. When over a thousand people protested police brutality against Ethiopians and dark-skinned Israelis, Prime Minister Benjamin Netanyahu announced: "I strongly condemn the beating of the Ethiopian IDF soldier, and those responsible will be held accountable." Following protests and demonstrations in Tel Aviv that resulted in violence, Netanyahu planned to meet with representatives of the Ethiopian community, including Pakado.

Large protests broke out in July 2019 after Solomon Teka, a young Ethiopian man, was shot and killed by an off-duty policy officer, in Kiryat Haim, Haifa, in northern Israel.

=== Blood donations ===
On January 24, 1996, Ma'ariv newspaper revealed a Magen David Adom policy that drew heavy criticism in Israel and worldwide. According to the policy, which was not brought to the attention of the Israeli Ministry of Health or donors, blood donations received from Ethiopian immigrants and their offspring were secretly disposed of. A later public inquiry traced this back to a misinterpretation of a 1984 instruction to mark blood donations from Ethiopian immigrants due to a relatively high prevalence of HBsAg, indicative of Hepatitis B infections, in blood samples taken from this population.

The public outcry led to the establishment of a commission of inquiry headed by former Israeli president Yitzhak Navon. After several months, the committee published its conclusions, calling for a change in policy. The Committee did not find evidence of racism, although some researchers have contested this.

On November 6, 2006, hundreds of Ethiopian protesters clashed with police while attempting to block the entrance to Jerusalem in the wake of the Israeli Health Ministry's decision to continue the MDA policy of disposing of donations from high-risk groups.

To date, the MDA prohibits the use of blood donations from natives of sub-Saharan Africa, except South Africa, natives of Southeast Asia, natives of the Caribbean and natives of countries which have been widely affected by the AIDS epidemic, including donations from the natives of Ethiopia. Since 1991, all immigrants from Ethiopia undergo mandatory HIV screenings, regardless of their intention to donate blood.

=== Birth control ===
On 8 December 2012, the Israeli Educational Television program Vacuum, hosted by Gal Gabbai, aired an investigative report claiming that Ethiopian Jewish women had been coerced into receiving Depo-Provera injections, with some stating they were told the injections were a prerequisite for immigration or led to believe they were routine inoculations rather than long-acting contraceptives while in transit camps in Ethiopia. One woman interviewed recounted: "They told us they are inoculations. We took it every three months. We said we didn't want to."

The practice was first highlighted in 2010 by Isha le'Isha (Woman to Woman), an Israeli feminist organization. Hedva Eyal, author of the organization's report, stated: "We believe it is a method of reducing the number of births in a community that is black and mostly poor."

In January 2013, the Director-General of the Ministry of Health, Professor Ron Gamzu, issued an official directive instructing gynecologists and health maintenance organizations "not to renew prescriptions for Depo-Provera for women of Ethiopian origin if for any reason there is concern that they might not understand the ramifications of the treatment." Sharona Eliahu Chai, an attorney with the Association for Civil Rights in Israel (ACRI), called the findings "extremely worrisome, raising concerns of harmful health policies with racist implications in violation of medical ethics," while commending the Ministry for issuing clear operational guidelines.

Following the directive, several international media outlets characterized the administration of Depo-Provera as an admission of a covert, state-run program to involuntarily sterilize Ethiopian immigrants. Haaretz criticized this coverage, stating that while medical paternalism and informed-consent violations had occurred, Depo-Provera is a temporary, three-month contraceptive rather than permanent sterilization. Commentators argued that portraying the episode as a coordinated sterilization program was a distortion amplified by circular reporting. The publication later issued a clarification regarding its initial headlines.

In January 2016, a three-year inquiry conducted by the State Comptroller of Israel, Joseph Shapira, concluded that there was no evidence that Ethiopian women were administered contraceptive injections under coercion, threats, or a centralized state directive. In a study published that same year, historian Steven Kaplan attributed the steep decline in the community's birth rate to socio-demographic transitions, including "urbanization, improved educational opportunities, a later age of marriage and commencement of childbirth and an earlier age of cessation of childbearing."

The integrity, methodology, and conclusions of the State Comptroller's report were disputed by community organizers, legal researchers, and civil liberties groups, who argued that an internal statutory ombudsman faced inherent conflicts of interest when evaluating state institutional conduct. Critics pointed out that the Comptroller's mandate did not extend jurisdiction to non-governmental bodies operating overseas, meaning medical practices overseen by the American Jewish Joint Distribution Committee (JDC) and transit facilities in Gondar and Addis Ababa—where many of the coercive encounters were alleged to have taken place—remained largely outside the audit's investigative scope. Furthermore, scholars and rights advocates criticized the investigation's heavy reliance on official bureaucratic paperwork and state clinic testimonies, arguing that an audit of formal written logs was ill-suited to detect informal coercion, structural power imbalances, or oral misdirection given to illiterate or non-Hebrew-speaking patients. By defining the absence of an explicit written government order as proof of no wrongdoing, critics contended the Comptroller minimized systemic medical paternalism and shielded state health authorities from substantive accountability.<

== See also ==
- Ethiopia–Israel relations
- Ethiopian cuisine
- Aliyah from Ethiopia
- History of the Jews in Africa
- History of the Jews in Ethiopia
- Jewish Agency for Israel
- Jewish ethnic divisions
- List of Israeli Ethiopian Jews
- The Red Sea Diving Resort
