= Aliyah from Ethiopia =

Immigration of Ethiopian Jews to Israel

Aliyah from Ethiopia is the immigration of the Beta Israel people to Israel. Early forms of Zionism have existed in Ethiopia since the mid 19th century, as shown in the 1848 letters from the Beta Israel to Jews in Europe praying for the unification of Jews. A year after the first letter was sent, Daniel Ben Hananiah and his son were sent by the Kahen to Jerusalem and made contact with the Jewish leaders there.

== 19th century ==
In a letter written by Abba Zaga of Beta Israel to Jerusalem, the Kahen speaks on their wish to return to Zion:

Peace be upon you Hebrew brothers. We have already sent you a first letter from Daniel ben Hananiah, Avi Moshe. Is it time for us to return to our holy city of Jerusalem? We are a miserable nation, we have no judge and no prophet. If it is time they sent us a letter, because you know more than him; Tell us the real situation. As for us, there was great excitement in our hearts, because people arose in our country who said it was time. They command us to separate ourselves from the Christians, to immigrate to your land, to Jerusalem, to join our brethren, and to offer sacrifices to God, the God of Israel, in the Holy Land.

In 1869, Abba Mehari led an attempted mass aliyah to Jerusalem. It was a failure due to disease and many died. German-born missionary Johann Martin Flad reported in 1874: "Once I met a monk, Abba Mehari, who was convinced that the time was coming when the Lord would gather them the Jews of all peoples, and bring them into the land of their ancestors."

== Pre-Israel Immigration ==
The first Ethiopian-Jewish immigrants to successfully make Aliyah arrived in 1934, together with Yemenite Jews from Italian Eritrea. During this period there were a number of Jewish families of mixed Ethiopian–Yemenite descent mostly living in the district of Begemder and Eritrea.

== Eligibility of Beta Israel for Aliyah ==
In 1973, the Israeli Ministry of Absorption prepared a comprehensive report on the Beta Israel ethnic group (the historical name of the Israelite Ethiopian community), which stated that the Falasha were foreign in all aspects to the Jewish nation. The report concluded that there was no need to take action in order to help the ethnic group make Aliyah to Israel.

Shortly after the publication of the Ministry of Absorption report in 1973, Rabbi Ovadia Yosef, the Sephardi Chief Rabbi, decreed that the community of "Beta Israel" are descendants of Israelites. He also said that giving them a proper Jewish education and the right to immigrate to Israel, was in his definition, a Mitzvah. Shlomo Goren, the Ashkenazi Chief Rabbi, agreed with Yosef based on the previous Chief Rabbi Abraham Isaac Kook. Goren did not, however, issue an official statement, claiming that Kook's 1921 letter calling for Jews across the world to "save their Falasha brothers" was still a relevant decree. Ovadia Yosef's Halakha ruling ended with the Law of Return being applied to Ethiopian Jews, notwithstanding the Ministry of Absorption report. In order to bring the Beta Israel community to Israel, an inter-office staff was founded, which included representatives from the Israeli Justice Department, Israeli Ministry of Interior, Israeli Ministry of Absorption and the Jewish Agency for Israel.

This action was mainly promoted after the election of Menachem Begin as Prime Minister in 1977.

== Beta Israel Exodus (1979–1985) ==
Aliyah from Ethiopia compared to the total Aliyah to Israel
Years	Ethiopian-born immigrants	Total immigration to Israel
1948–1951	10	687,624
1952–1960	59	297,138
1961–1971	98	427,828
1972–1979	306	267,580
1980–1989	16,965	153,833
1990–1999	39,651	956,319
2000–2004	14,859	181,505
2005–2009	12,586	86,855
2010–2013	7,200	67,050

In the absence of full diplomatic relations with Ethiopia, the Israeli Mossad contacted officials in Sudan, which is adjacent to Ethiopia. Thousands of Beta Israel from Ethiopia traveled by foot to the border with Sudan, and waited there in temporary camps until they were flown to Israel. Between the years 1977 and 1984, these immigrants traveled from those camps to Israel by means of vessels of the Israeli Sea Corps and by airplanes. Before Operation Moses, about 8,000 traveled to Israel in dangerous conditions; about 4,000 Beta Israel migrants perished from disease or hunger or were killed by bandits.

=== Operations Moses and Joshua ===
After it became clear that the immigrants who remained in the Sudanese camps were in danger, it was decided to pursue an operation of intense immigration, nicknamed "Operation Moses", during which about 8,000 immigrants were brought to Israel from Ethiopia using Israeli aircraft. Most of the immigrants in Operation Moses originated from the Gondar area.

Entire families including little children undertook long and dangerous treks, which often spanned whole months. As a result of the difficulties of the journey and bad conditions, hundreds and possibly even thousands of Beta Israel Ethiopians died on the way to the Sudanese camps. One of the main Ethiopian activists was Ferede Aklum, whom many perceive as an important figure in the Beta Israel community. It is estimated as many as 4,000 died during the trek, due to violence and illness along the way. Sudan secretly allowed Israel to evacuate the refugees. Two days after the airlifts began, Jewish journalists wrote about “the mass rescue of thousands of Ethiopian Jews.” The operation ended prematurely, after a press leak in Israel regarding Ethiopian Aliyah via Sudan to Israel. Operation Moses ended on Friday, January 5, 1985, after Israeli Prime Minister Shimon Peres held a press conference confirming the airlift while asking people not to talk about it. Sudan killed the airlift moments after Peres stopped speaking, ending it prematurely as the news began to reach their Arab allies. Once the story broke in the media, Arab countries pressured Sudan to stop the airlift. Although thousands made it successfully to Israel, many children died in the camps or during the flight to Israel, and it was reported that their parents brought their bodies down from the aircraft with them. Some 1,000 Ethiopian Jews were left behind, approximately 500 of whom were evacuated later in the U.S.-led Operation Joshua. After the media exposure to the operation, the political situation in the region changed. The Sudanese government, which had allowed Beta Israel entry into the country on their way to Israel, was dismissed, and relations between Israel and Sudan were soured.

Despite this, more Beta Israel were brought to Israel, including 1,200 in the Operation Sheba and 800 more on Operation Joshua that took place in 1985, with the help of George H. W. Bush, who was then Vice President of the United States.

== Operation Solomon ==
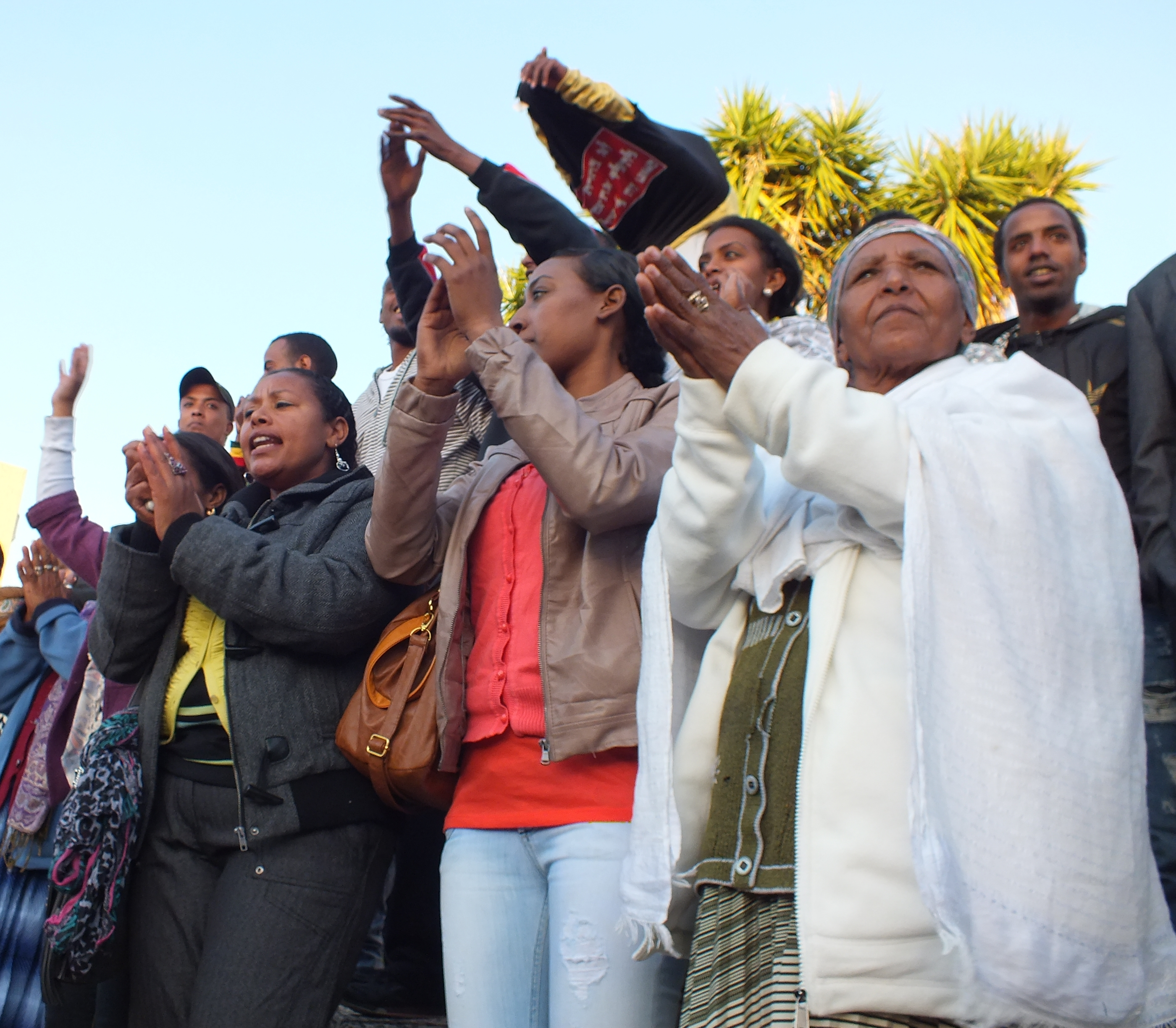
Women in Kiryat Malakhi, 2012

At the beginning of 1991, the dictatorship of Mengistu Haile Mariam in Ethiopia was about to collapse due to the rebel forces approaching the capital of Ethiopia, Addis Ababa. In the end of May 1991, several days before Addis Ababa was seized by the rebels, Mengistu escaped from Ethiopia and found shelter in Zimbabwe. An agreement was obtained between officials from Mengistu's government and Israel allowing the Ethiopian Beta Israel to emigrate to Israel in exchange for about US$35 million and shelter in the United States for several of the officials of the government.

Due to this agreement, Operation Solomon took place, during which about 14,400 Beta Israel were brought to Israel within 34 hours on 24 May 1991, in about 30 airplanes of the Israeli Air Force and the airline El Al.

== The Falash Mura ==
There are many descendants of Ethiopian Beta Israel, whose ancestors converted to Christianity and who are now returning to the Mosaic Israelite faith. This group of people is known as the Falash Mura. They are admitted entrance to Israel, although not as Israelites, thus enabling the Israeli government to set quotas to their immigration and make citizenship dependent on Orthodox conversion to modern Judaism. Although nobody knows for certain the exact population of the Falash Mura in Ethiopia, it is approximated to be 20,000–26,000. However, recently some reporters and other travelers in remote regions of Ethiopia have noted that they have found entire villages where people claim they are Beta Israel or are Falash Mura (Beta Israel who have been practicing Christianity). Chief Kes Raphael Hadane has argued for the acceptance of the Falasha Mura as Jews.

- In 2015 it was reported the number of Jews in Ethiopia were 4,000.
- In April 2016, the Israeli Government approved a plan to bring 9,000 Falashmuras to Israel over the course of five years. 1,300 were scheduled to arrive in June 2016.
- On 11 March 2021, 300 Ethiopian Jews went up to Israel, the last of 2,000 Jews from Operation Tzur Israel which began in December 2020.
- On 2 February 2022, the Israeli Supreme Court suspended Aliyah from Ethiopia.
- On 1 June 2022, 180 Jews from Ethiopia made Aliyah to Israel as part of Operation Zur Israel to reunite 3,000 Jews in Ethiopia with their brethren in Israel.
- On July 5, 2022, 150 Jews from Ethiopia made Aliyah to Israel as part of Operation Zur Israel.
- As of 14 June 2022, 500 Jews from Ethiopia made Aliyah to Israel.
- On February 1, 2023, 95 Jews from Ethiopia made Aliyah to Israel.
- On February 3, 2023, 120 Ethiopian Jews made Aliyah with the help of ICEJ.
- On May 9, 2023, 111 Jews from Ethiopia made Aliyah to Israel.
- On July 13, 2023, 5000 Ethiopian Immigrants were reunited with family in Israel
- On August 10, 2023 Israel rescued 174 Israelis and Ethiopians eligible to immigrate from the city of Gondar in Amhara
- In April 2024 61 Ethiopian Jews made Aliyah sponsored by ICEJ.
- As of April 2024, the president of the aid group Struggle to Save Ethiopian Jewry (SSEJ) estimated that some 13,000 people were still waiting.
- In response to a ruling from the Sahedrin calling on all Jews in galat to go up to Israel, a letter of 30 December 2024 from remnant of Jews in Sudan and Ethiopia who have declared their willingness to go up to Israel
- As of 11-March-2025 The International Christian Embassy Jerusalem sponsored 26 of these Ethiopian Jewish immigrants who arrived in February, while another 40 more will be coming soon on flights funded by the ICEJ.(In 2025, approximately 44 Ethiopian Jews are expected to immigrate to Israel, making it the first such aliyah (immigration) in years to be carried out according to the Law of Return. This immigration comes after a successful protest and follows a pattern of Operation Moses and Operation Solomon, large-scale migrations of Ethiopian Jews to Israel in the 1980s and 1991, respectively. Organizations like the International Christian Embassy Jerusalem (ICEJ) also play a role in supporting these immigrants, providing funding for flights and other needs.)
- September 2025 7,000 [estimated in Ethiopia] This figure was cited in a September 2025 op-ed in The Jerusalem Post, based on "official estimates". Another Jerusalem Post piece mentioned "roughly 7,000" waiting as of that month.
- According to the World Jewish Congress website: "Aliya: Since 1948, 50,700 Ethiopian Jews have emigrated to Israel"

== Challenges of integration in Israel ==
The biggest concentrations of the Ethiopians Beta Israel are in the cities Beersheba, Dimona, Mitzpe Ramon, Ashdod, Ashkelon, Lod, Ramla, Or Yehuda, Jerusalem, Netanya, Kiryat Malakhi.

A report carried out by the Bank of Israel in 2006 gave cause for concern regarding the absorption of the Ethiopian community to Israeli society:

- The incidence of poverty amongst Ethiopian families is estimated at 51.7% compared with 15.8% in the general Israeli population.
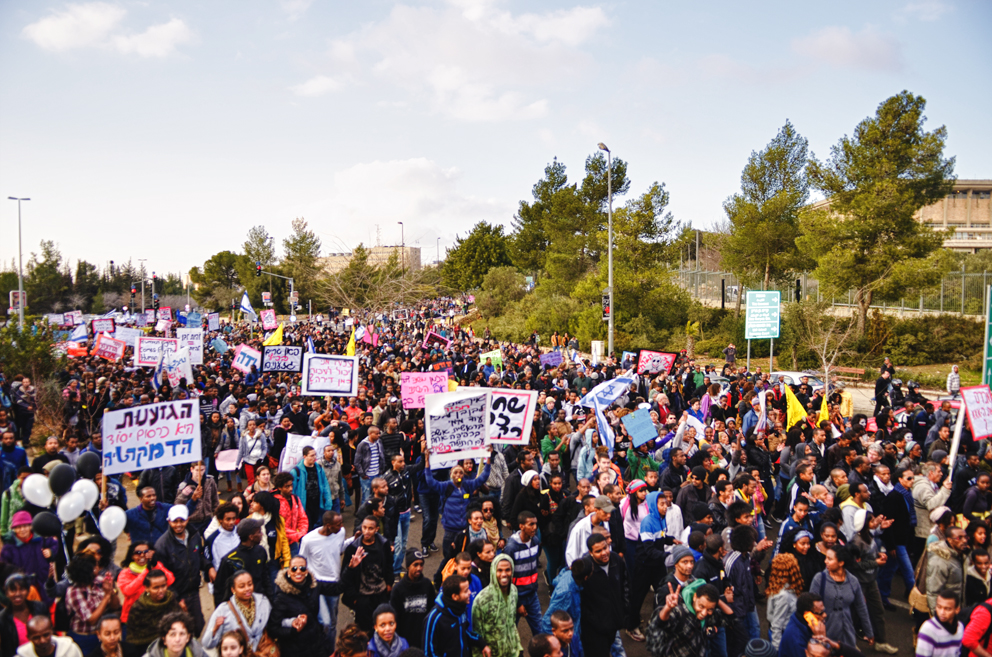
  A Beta Israel protest in Israel
- The rate of participation in the labor market is about 65.7% amongst adults compared with about 82.5% in the general Israeli population.
- The rate of unemployment amongst Ethiopians is estimated at 13.2% compared with 7.4% in the general Israeli population.
- The monthly income per capita is estimated at 1,994 New Israeli Shekels amongst Ethiopians compared with about 3,947 New Israeli Shekels in the general Israeli population.
- Students awarded the Bagrut Certification is estimated at 44% of Ethiopians compared with about 57% in the remaining Israeli population. Only about 34% meet the requirements needed for higher education, compared with about 83% of the Israeli population.
- About 21.7% of Ethiopian immigrants are holders of high school and higher education, compared with about 49.2% in the general Israeli population. About 20.4% of Ethiopian immigrants are not holders of a basic education, compared with about 0.9% from the general Israeli population.
- In the 2002–2003 school year, the rate of criminal charges brought against 12- to 20-year-old Ethiopian immigrants was 4.6%, twice as high as the number of criminal charges brought against the equivalent age group from the remainder of Israeli society.

The Bank of Israel report also highlights mistakes made by the government in its attempt to integrate Ethiopian immigrants into mainstream Israeli society, despite the estimated 400,000 NIS spent per immigrant. In addition to government financial investments, money was also invested from private donations, and by local authority welfare systems, and towards Affirmative action schemes to help immigrants undertake mandatory army or national service and for their greater inclusion in higher education. The report recommended that measures be taken to encourage immigrants to disperse around the country, rather than remain concentrated in the small communities in which they were initially placed. In addition, it recommended that greater resources be allocated to schools to improve education for Ethiopian children. Lastly, the report recommended that greater emphasis be placed on providing professional training to Ethiopian immigrants and that affirmative action be considered to aid their inclusion in public service jobs.

In 2009, Tzion Shenkor, the highest-ranking Ethiopian officer in the Israel Defense Forces with a rank of Lieutenant Colonel, became the first battalion commander of Ethiopian descent.
