= List of ambassadors of Israel to Ethiopia =

The Israeli ambassador to Ethiopia is the ambassador extraordinary and plenipotentiary from the State of Israel to the Federal Democratic Republic of Ethiopia.

== History of the office ==
In 2012, Belaynesh Zevadia became the first Ethiopian-born Israeli to serve in the position. The current ambassador is Ethiopia-born Aleligne Admasu, who was appointed in March 2021.

== List of ambassadors ==
- Aleligne Admasu (2021-present)
- Raphael Morav (2017 - 2021)
- Belaynesh Zevadia (2012-2017)
- Oded Ben-Haim (2008-2012)
- Yaacov Amitai (2005-2008)
- Doron Mordechai Grossman (2002-2005)
- Ariel Kerem (1998-2002)
- Avi Avraham Granot (1995-1998)
- Ori Noy (1993-1995)
- Haim Divon (1991-1993)
- Asher Naim (1990-1991)
- Meir Joffe (1990)
- Hanan Einor (1981 - 1982); (1971-1973)
- Uri Lubrani (1967-1971)
- Haim Ben-David (1966-1967)
- Shmuel Divon (1962-1966)
