= Belaynesh =

Belaynesh or Belayneh is a feminine Ethiopian given name. Notable people with the name include:

== Belaynesh ==
- Belaynesh Fikadu (born 1987), Ethiopian long-distance runner
- Belaynesh Oljira (born 1990), Ethiopian long-distance runner
- Belaynesh Zevadia (born 1967), Ethiopian-born Israeli diplomat

== Belayneh ==
- Fantaye Belayneh – Ethiopian long-distance runner (born 2000)
- Belayneh Dinsamo – Ethiopian long-distance runner
- Betlhem Desalegn Belayneh – Emirati middle-distance runner
