= Uri Lubrani =

Israeli diplomat and military official (1926-2018)

- אורי לוברני
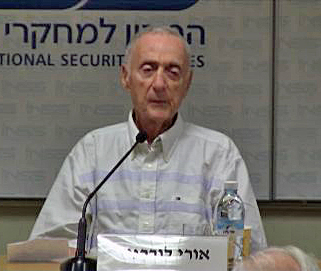
- Lubrani in June 2013
- Born: Uriel Lubrani; October 7, 1926; Haifa, Mandatory Palestine
- Died: March 5, 2018 (aged 91); Tel Aviv, Israel
- Resting place: Kiryat Shaul Cemetery, Tel Aviv
- Education: Hebrew Reali School; London University (BA)
- Occupations: Diplomat, military official, and national security advisor
- Years active: 1950–2018
- Known for: Negotiated and coordinated Operation Solomon; negotiated prisoner exchanges with Hezbollah; coordinator of Israeli strategy and activities in Lebanon
- Title: Israeli Ambassador to Uganda, Burundi, Rwanda, Ethiopia, and the Imperial State of Iran.
- Children: Osnat Lubrani (daughter)

Uriel Lubrani (Hebrew: אורי לוברני; October 7, 1926 – March 5, 2018) was an Israeli diplomat, military official, and national security advisor whose six-decade career influenced Israel's foreign policy and defense in East Africa and the Middle East.

Born in Haifa in Palestine, in the 1940s he was a member of the Haganah, the Palmach, and the IDF. In 1964, he joined the diplomatic corps of the Israeli Foreign Ministry. He was appointed Israeli ambassador to Uganda and non-resident ambassador to Burundi and Rwanda, serving until 1967. From 1967 to 1971, he was ambassador to Ethiopia. From 1973 to 1978, he was ambassador to the Imperial State of Iran

From 1983 to 2000, Lubrani was the coordinator of the government strategy and the activities of Israeli forces in Lebanon. Concurrently, in 1990, Lubrani was designated chief diplomatic coordinator in Ethiopia, where he negotiated and coordinated Operation Solomon, the 1991 airlift that evacuated over 14,000 Ethiopian Jews to Israel within 36 hours. Lubrani negotiated prisoner exchanges with Hezbollah and other regional actors holding Western and Israeli hostages. and in 1992 entered into peace negotiations with Lebanese counter-parties. After the Israeli withdrawal from southern Lebanon in May 2000, he continued to serve the Israeli government until 2015 on Lebanese and Iranian affairs, and on regional security.

== Early life ==
Uriel "Uri" Lubrani was born on October 7, 1926, in Haifa, within what was then British Mandate Palestine. He was the only son of Aaron and Rose Lubrani. His father worked as a veterinarian and managed a local children's theater company. He attended the Hebrew Reali School in Haifa.

== The Haganah, Palmach, and the IDF ==
In 1944, at the age of 18, he joined the Haganah. He subsequently served within its specialized elite fighting strike force, the Palmach. During this period, he assisted in Aliyah Bet maritime operations to smuggle illegal Jewish refugee and Holocaust survivors immigrants into Palestine past the British blockade. The Haganah dispatched Lubrani to southern France in 1946, where he was tasked with commanding a clandestine training camp for foreign volunteers from English-speaking countries who were willing to deploy and fight for the Jewish cause.

He returned to the region with one such group to fight in the 1948 Arab-Israeli War. In the war of independence, he used his language skills and regional knowledge as an intelligence officer assigned to both the 7th Armored Brigade and the Yiftach Brigade of the newly formed Israel Defense Forces.

== Diplomatic career ==
=== Early years ===
After the 1948 war ended, Lubrani joined the Middle East Department of the Israeli Foreign Ministry, and in 1950 was appointed secretary and bureau head for Foreign Minister Moshe Sharet. Between 1953 and 1956, he studied at London University, and earned a BA.

After returning to Israel in 1956, he was appointed Deputy Adviser on Arab Affairs for Prime Minister David Ben-Gurion. In this role, he focused on spearheading infrastructure and economic development within local Arab villages while concurrently recruiting Israeli Druze citizens into military service. He then served as Bureau Manager and Secretary of Policy for Prime Minister Levi Eshkol during the early 1960s.

=== Africa; Uganda, Burundi, Rwanda, and Ethiopia ===
In 1964, he joined the diplomatic corps of the Foreign Ministry, and was appointed ambassador to Uganda and non-resident ambassador to Burundi and Rwanda, serving until 1967.

From 1967 to 1971, he was ambassador to Ethiopia, managing ties with Emperor Haile Selassie. He then served as managing director of the state-owned Koor Industries Ltd. from 1971 to 1973.

=== Iran ===
He served as the Israeli ambassador to Iran from 1973 to 1978, where he accurately predicted the impending fall of Shah of Iran Mohammad Reza Pahlavi, though his assessments were largely dismissed by his superiors at the time.

From 1979 to 1983, he worked in the private sector.

=== Lebanon and Ethiopia; Operation Solomon ===
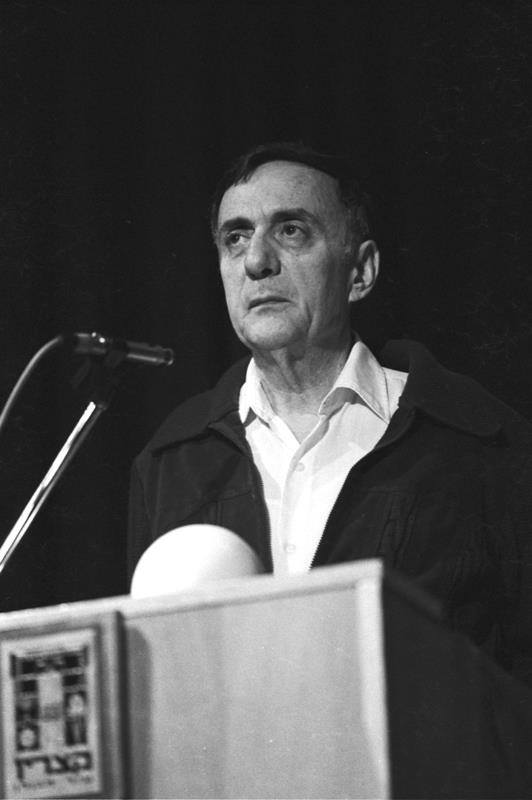
Ladani in 1984

In 1983, during the South Lebanon conflict between Hezbollah and other Shia Muslim and left-wing guerrillas against Israel and its ally the Catholic primarily Christian South Lebanon Army (SLA), Lubrani was appointed the coordinator of government activities of Israeli forces in Lebanon, a security and diplomatic role he maintained until Israel's withdrawal in 2000.

Concurrently, in September 1990, Lubrani was designated as a chief diplomatic coordinator in Ethiopia, where he negotiated the logistical framework for Operation Solomon, the May 1991 airlift that evacuated over 14,000 Ethiopian Jews to Israel within 36 hours.

=== Hezbollah and Lebanon; prisoner exchanges ===
As part of his regional security portfolio, Lubrani served as the lead negotiator of the Israeli delegation in Geneva, orchestrating highly sensitive back-channel communications arranging prisoner exchanges with Hezbollah and other regional actors holding Western and Israeli hostages. In 1992, in the wake of the Madrid Conference of 1991, he headed the Israeli diplomatic delegation to Washington, D.C. for direct peace negotiations with Lebanese counterparts, where he debated regional security parameters and sought accountability regarding missing Israeli personnel.

=== Lebanon ===
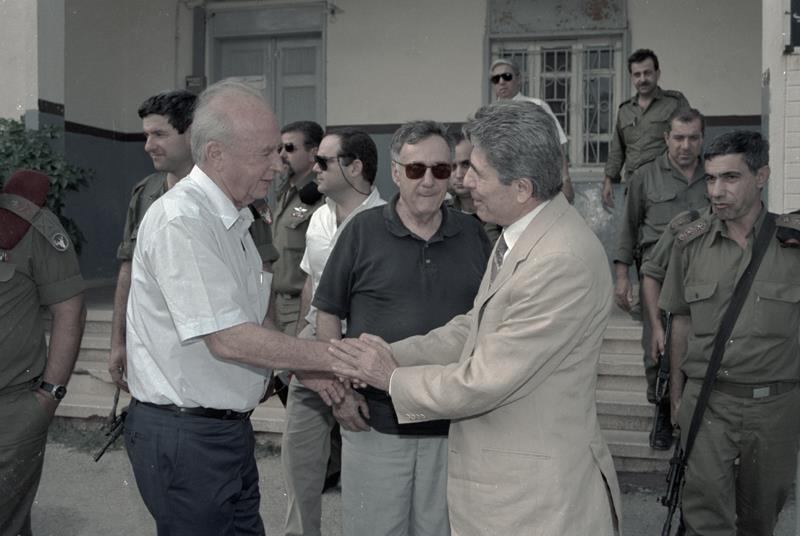
Visit to the Northern Command. Shaking hands on the left Israeli Prime Minister Yitzhak Rabin, on the right South Lebanon Army Commander Antoine Lahad, behind them Uri Lubrani, July 28, 1992.

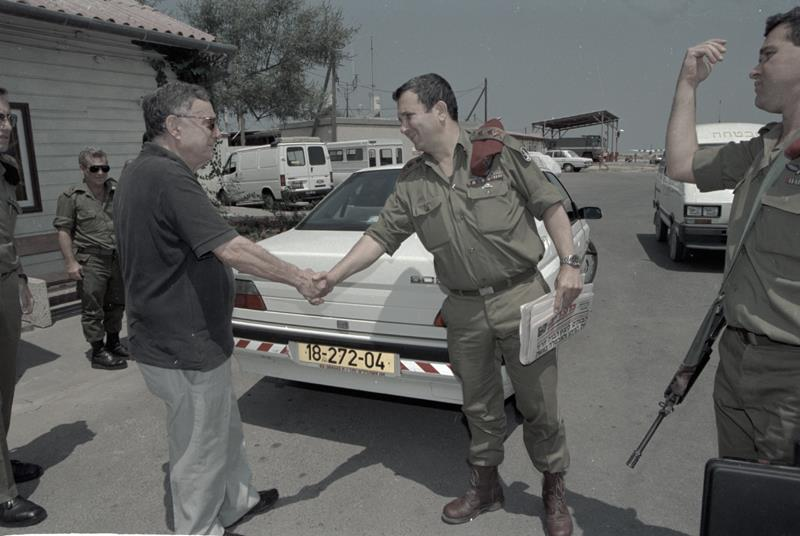
Uri Lubrani (left) shaking hands with IDF head Ehud Barak , July 28, 1992.

After the Israeli withdrawal from southern Lebanon in May 2000, he continued to serve until 2015 as the coordinator for government operations in Lebanon and as a senior consultant, focusing on Lebanese affairs and regional security, for the Israeli successive Ministers of Defense and coordinator for government operations in Lebanon, and then for the Ministry of Strategic Affairs, advising on intelligence matters. In this role, he utilized his extensive regional expertise to advise on ongoing security threats along the northern border and policy toward Hezbollah. At the Ministry of Strategic Affairs he continued to serve as a high-level consultant on regional strategic threats, particularly regarding Iranian geopolitical influence, until his retirement from public service in 2015.

=== Iran ===
In December 2017, Lubrani opined that the only way to stop Iran's nuclear program was to overthrow the Iranian regime. He said that diplomatic or military actions would be ineffective, compared to regime change.

== Family, and death ==
His daughter, Osnat Lubrani became the UN Humanitarian Coordinator in Ukraine in 2018. Prior to her service there, she was the Resident Coordinator for the Pacific. She has held conflict resolution posts with the United Nations in Kosovo and human rights and development positions in Zaire.

After a multi-decade career in foreign diplomacy and national security, Lubrani died from natural causes in Tel Aviv on March 5, 2018, at the age of 91, and he is buried at the Kiryat Shaul Cemetery in Tel Aviv.

== In popular culture ==
Lubrani is portrayed in the 2026 Bryan Singer-directed film Monument by Alon Abutbul. He stars alongside Jon Voight as Israeli architect Yaakov Rechter, Joseph Mazzello as Rechter's son, and Igal Naor as Antoine Lahad.

== See also ==
- Embassy of Israel, Tehran
- Iran–Israel relations
- Osnat Lubrani
