= Asher Naim =

Asher Naim (Hebrew: אשר נעים; December 28, 1929 – November 11, 2016) was an Israeli diplomat who served in Israeli missions to the United States, Finland, Ethiopia, United Nations, and South Korea. Naim was Israel's ambassador to Ethiopia from 1990 to 1991 and played a crucial role in the 1991 Operation Solomon which airlifted around 14,200 Ethiopian Jews to Israel in a single day.

== Early life and education ==
Naim was born in Tripoli, Libya, and moved to Israel with his family in 1944. He graduated from Hebrew University of Jerusalem and held a master's degree in jurisprudence.

== Career ==
Naim served in Israel's Foreign Ministry from 1956 until his retirement in 1999. He began his career as a cultural and press attaché in Tokyo (1956-1960), where he also taught Hebrew at Tokyo University. In 1960, he was sent to Kenya, which was then a British colony in the process of gaining independence, in the hope of building diplomatic relations with it once it became an independent state. While posted there, Naim worked closely with Kenyan leader Jomo Kenyatta, who later became the country's first president, and paved the way to fruitful relations between Kenya and Israel. Naim later served in Washington D.C. from 1968 to 1973 as an assistant to Ambassador Yitzhak Rabin and then as Consul General of Israel in Philadelphia from 1976 to 1981. Following a stint back at the Foreign Ministry in Jerusalem, he returned to the Israeli embassy in Washington in 1985 as information minister before assuming his responsibilities as Ambassador in Finland from 1988 to 1990, and then in Ethiopia from 1990 to 1991. After a brief stint at the United Nations, he completed his career as Ambassador to South Korea from 1992 to 1995.

== Operation Solomon ==
In 1990, Ethiopia's long-lasting civil war came to an end, and the government of Mengistu Haile Mariam was about to be toppled. Israel was concerned for an ancient community of the Beta Israel, Jews who had been living in that country for three thousand years, which was the main reason that Naim was sent there. Naim was instrumental in the process of negotiating with Ethiopia's then-President Mengistu. Operation Solomon was launched on May 21, 1991. It involved 41 flights, 37 airplanes, lasted for 25 hours and brought 14,200 Ethiopian Jews to Israel. Because of Naim's crucial role in Operation Solomon, he was awarded the highest recognition by Israel's President Chaim Herzog.

== Legacy ==
After their arrival in Israel, the next challenge was absorbing the new Ethiopian Jewish immigrants into the mainstream of Israeli society. Although officially retired in 1999, Naim continued to draw support for the Beta Israel that he helped save. Naim, along with mainly American philanthropists, founded the Keren Hanan Aynor Foundation, which provided scholarships to support young Ethiopians in Israel who wished to attend the country's colleges and graduate schools.

== Death ==
Asher Naim passed at his home in Jerusalem after a long illness on November 11, 2016. He was survived by his wife Hilda, his children Ronit Zohar, Ari Naim and Gideon Naim, as well as seven grandchildren, and many siblings and extended family.

== Books ==
- Saving the Lost Tribe: The Rescue and Redemption of the Ethiopian Jews, by Asher Naim, 2003
- Jaekob, the Dreamer, by Sylvia Rouss and Asher Naim, 2015
- Yosef's Dream, by Sylvia Rouss and Asher Naim, 2015

== See also ==
- Operation Solomon
