= The Red Sea Diving Resort =

2019 Netflix film

- Promotional poster
- Directed by: Gideon Raff
- Written by: Gideon Raff
- Produced by: Aaron L. Gilbert; Alexandra Milchan; Gideon Raff
- Starring: Chris Evans; Haley Bennett; Alessandro Nivola; Michael K. Williams; Michiel Huisman; Alex Hassell; Mark Ivanir; Chris Chalk; Greg Kinnear; Ben Kingsley
- Cinematography: Roberto Schaefer
- Edited by: Tim Squyres
- Music by: Mychael Danna
- Production companies: Bron Studios; EMJAG Productions; Shaken Not Stirred
- Distributed by: Netflix
- Release dates: July 28, 2019 (SFJFF); July 31, 2019 (United States)
- Running time: 130 minutes
- Countries: Canada; United States
- Language: English

The Red Sea Diving Resort (also known as Operation Brothers) is a 2019 spy thriller film written and directed by Gideon Raff. The film stars Chris Evans as an Israeli Mossad agent who runs a covert operation to rescue Ethiopian-Jewish refugees from Sudan to safe haven in Israel. Michael K. Williams, Haley Bennett, Alessandro Nivola, Michiel Huisman, Chris Chalk, Greg Kinnear, and Ben Kingsley are in supporting roles.

The film is loosely based on the events of Israel's Operation Moses and Operation Joshua in 1984-1985, in which the Mossad covertly rescued Jewish-Ethiopian refugees who suffered from persecutions in Sudan in Africa, by smuggling them all the way to the safety of Israel, using a base at the once-abandoned holiday resort of Arous Village on the Sudanese Red Sea coast, about 70km (43 miles) north of Port Sudan.

The Red Sea Diving Resort premiered at the San Francisco Jewish Film Festival on July 28, 2019, and was released on July 31, 2019, by Netflix. Critical reaction to the film was predominantly negative, while audiences were mixed to positive.

== Plot ==
Kebede Bimro, an Ethiopian Jew loosely based on Ferede Aklum, works with the Israeli Mossad agent Ari Levinson to evacuate Jewish-Ethiopian refugees to Israel via Sudan. Ari realizes that his ability to operate in Ethiopia would be improved if he had a cover activity that would give him a reason for having a building and vehicles. He proposes to Israeli intelligence officer Ethan Levin a plan that would allow him to evacuate significantly more refugees: rent the Red Sea Diving Resort, an abandoned Sudanese coastal hotel, and run it as a front to facilitate moving refugees out of the country. The unorthodox plan is reluctantly approved, and Ari recruits his former Mossad colleagues, Rachel Reiter, Jake Wolf, Max Rose, and Sammy Navon, to assist him.

Shortly after the team arrives in Sudan, the brochures they had printed inspire actual tourists to begin arriving at the resort. Although hosting guests was not originally part of the plan, Levinson realizes the tourists will provide cover for the team's operations, so the team runs the resort as a legitimate business while simultaneously evacuating refugees to a waiting Israeli ship off the coast. The plan is initially successful, and multiple extraction operations are carried out, but the Sudanese Colonel Abdel Ahmed learns of Bimro after interrogating and then killing a group of refugees. Ahmed visits the resort to investigate but does not discover the refugee operation.

One night, Ari and Sammy are arrested after an evacuation mission narrowly escapes from Sudanese soldiers. They are released and return to the resort to find Levin awaiting them; he tells the group the mission has been compromised and that it is canceled.

Colonel Ahmed again visits the resort, and Rachel is forced to kill one of his men after the soldier discovers a group of refugees hiding there. To evacuate them, Ari decides to perform a final refugee extraction by cargo plane with assistance from Walton Bowen, a CIA officer. Ari and his team transport the refugees to an abandoned British airfield. The team and Bimro narrowly escape Ahmed and extract themselves and the refugees, landing at Ben Gurion Airport.

== Cast ==
- Chris Evans as Ari Levinson
- Michael K. Williams as Kabede Bimro
- Haley Bennett as Rachel Reiter
- Michiel Huisman as Jacob 'Jake' Wolf
- Alessandro Nivola as Sammy Navon
- Greg Kinnear as Walton Bowen
- Ben Kingsley as Ethan Levin
- Alex Hassell as Max Rose
- Mark Ivanir as Barack Isaacs
- Chris Chalk as Col. Abdel Ahmed
- Alona Tal as Sarah Levinson

== Production ==
The Red Sea Diving Resort is loosely based on the events of Operation Moses and Operation Joshua (jointly referred to as Operation Brothers), in which Ethiopian Jews were covertly moved from refugee camps in Sudan to Israel during the 1980s. The actual abandoned resort, the Arous Holiday Village on the Red Sea, was located roughly 70 kilometers from Port Sudan and was managed by Mossad operatives until 1985. The existence of these operations was first revealed in Gad Shimron’s 1998 book Mossad Exodus: The Daring Undercover Rescue of the Lost Jewish Tribe, though the film is not associated with the book.

In August 2015, Fox Searchlight purchased the rights for the film. Development on the film was first announced in March 2017, with Gideon Raff directing and writing the screenplay, and Chris Evans and Haley Bennett cast. In April, Michael K. Williams joined the project. In May, Greg Kinnear, Alessandro Nivola, and Ben Kingsley were added to the cast, with a filming start date of June 22, 2017, established. Chris Chalk was cast on June 15. Shooting took place at the Cape Town Film Studios in South Africa and Namibia.

== Release ==
In February 2019, Netflix acquired distribution rights to the film. It had its world premiere at the San Francisco Jewish Film Festival on July 28, 2019. It was released on July 31, 2019.

== Reception ==
On Rotten Tomatoes, the film has an approval rating of 28% based on 40 reviews, with a weighted average of 4.6/10. The website's critical consensus reads, "The Red Sea Diving Resort makes uninspired use of actual events, using thinly written characters to tell a story derailed by its own good intentions." On Metacritic, the film has a score of 29 out of 100, based on reviews from eight critics, indicating "generally unfavorable reviews".

The movie has been criticized for its white savior narrative, putting the focus on the Mossad agent rather than the Ethiopian refugees. Variety wrote "it’s impossible to ignore how badly the film marginalizes the courageous Ethiopian refugees about whom it purports to care so deeply" and regrets that the film does not tell the story from the perspective of Kabede leading his people to the Promised Land. Likewise, the movie shows Mossad agent Ari Levinson as the only instigator of the evacuation plan, while in real life, "the origins of Operation Brothers were also due in large part to the efforts of activists from the Ethiopian Jewish community". The film also presents the Sudanese soldiers and government in a stereotypical way and barely explains the historical context, "never adequately representing the political situation that necessitated such an elaborate operation".
