= List of ambassadors of Israel to Rwanda =

== List of ambassadors ==
- Ron Adam (diplomat) 2019 -
- Belaynesh Zevadia
- Aharon Ofri (Non-Resident, Kampala) 1968 - 1971
- Chargé d'affaires a.i Meir Joffe
- Uri Lubrani (Non-Resident, Kampala) 1965 - 1967
- Chargé d'affaires a.i Aryeh Levin (diplomat)
- Michael Michael (diplomat) (Non-Resident, Kampala) 1962 - 1965
