= Operation Tzur Israel =

Operation Tzur Israel was an initiative of the Israeli government carried out between 2020 and 2023 to bring members of the Ethiopian community awaiting immigration to Israel. Most participants were descendants of Beta Israel who had not been included in earlier waves of Ethiopian Jewish immigration. The operation was implemented in cooperation with the Jewish Agency for Israel.

The first phase began on 3 December 2020 and concluded on 15 March 2021, during which approximately 2,000 immigrants arrived in Israel. A second phase was authorized by the Israeli government in November 2021 and continued through July 2023. In total, about 5,000 immigrants were brought to Israel during the operation.

== Background ==
For decades, thousands of Ethiopians with familial or historical ties to the Beta Israel community remained in Ethiopia after major airlifts such as Operation Moses (1984), Operation Joshua (1985) and Operation Solomon (1991). Many relocated to waiting compounds in Addis Ababa and Gondar in anticipation of approval to immigrate to Israel, often leaving behind property and livelihoods.

Their legal status differed from earlier immigrants: many were not recognized as Jewish under Israeli religious law but were classified by the government as Zera Israel (people of Jewish ancestry). As a result, their entry to Israel was typically authorized through government decisions under the provisions of the Citizenship and Entry into Israel Law rather than the Law of Return, and they underwent conversion procedures upon arrival.

Living conditions in the waiting compounds were frequently described in media reports and by aid workers as difficult, particularly during the COVID-19 pandemic, which worsened food insecurity and reduced financial support from relatives in Israel.

== Government decision and implementation ==
In October 2020, the Israeli government approved a plan to bring 2,000 eligible immigrants by early 2021. Priority was given to individuals with first-degree relatives in Israel who had immigrated under previous government decisions. The plan also allowed eligible immigrants to bring spouses, minor children, unmarried adult children, and a remaining parent. The operation required an estimated budget of approximately 380 million shekels. The first phase concluded in March 2021 after reaching its target.

After a pause of roughly one year, the government approved a renewed framework in November 2021, enabling the continuation of immigration flights beginning in June 2022. Additional groups arrived throughout 2022 and 2023, and the final flights under the operation landed in July 2023.

== Scope and aftermath ==
By the end of Operation Tzur Israel, approximately 5,000 immigrants had arrived in Israel. Despite this, thousands of additional applicants remained in Ethiopia, and public debate continued in Israel regarding eligibility criteria, humanitarian considerations, and the future of the waiting compounds. The operation reflected ongoing efforts by successive Israeli governments to address family reunification claims and humanitarian concerns among Ethiopians with ancestral ties to the Jewish people, while balancing legal, religious, and policy considerations.

== See also ==
- Ethiopian Jews
- Aliyah from Ethiopia
