= Ferede Aklum =

Ethiopian-Israel Activist

- אקלום פרדה
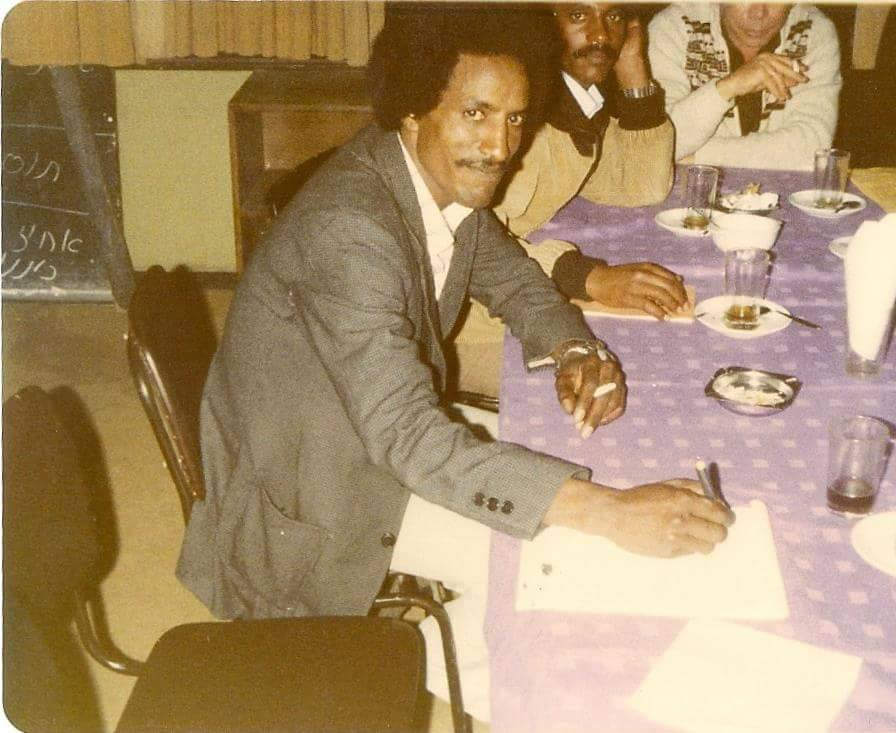
- Aklum in 1982
- Born: Ferede Yazezew Aklum; May 15, 1949; Medabay, Ethiopia
- Died: January 7, 2009 (aged 59); Addis Ababa
- Resting place: New Be'er Sheva Cemetery.
- Occupation: Mossad Agent
- Spouses: Eneish Berihun-Yishayahu; Semira (died)
- Children: 8

Ferede Yazezew Aklum (Hebrew: פרדה יזזאו אקלום; May 15, 1949 – January 7, 2009), sometimes known as Farada Aklum or Ferede Yazazao Aklum, was the first Ethiopian Jew to arrive in Israel on foot via Sudan. Later, he became a Mossad agent and activist best known for helping Ethiopian Jews immigrate to Israel, including members of his family. His contributions helped pave the way for Ethiopian Jews to get to Israel via Sudan through Operation Moses and Operation Solomon. He died on a trip to Addis Ababa and is buried in Beersheba.

== Early life ==
Aklum was born in the Medabay village of the Tigray in Ethiopia to Yazezew Aklum and Avrehet Worku. He grew up in the Adi Worewa village. His father insisted he focus on formal education, so Aklum walked several kilometers to school in Shire. He eventually earned a teaching degree at the College of Addis in Addis Ababa. After earning his degree, he became headmaster of a school and mayor of the Indabunga Municipality.

== Sudan ==
After Moshe Dayan disclosed Israel was selling arms to Ethiopia, the Ethiopian government began targeting Jewish activists. Aklum was identified as a Zionist and fled to Sudan.

Arriving without money, he sold his wedding ring for money to contact the Mossad. This led to Mossad agent Danny Limor searching for him in Khartoum. After making contact, the two spent the next 18 months secretly helping Jewish refugees cross into Sudan and travel to Israel. The refugees had to travel via Europe because Sudan had severed ties with Israel. Aklum finally left Sudan in September 1980 when it became apparent the Sudanese authorities intended to imprison him for his activities.

== Israel ==
Upon arriving in Israel, Aklum reunited with his family and began studying electrical engineering. The plight of Ethiopian Jews eventually led him back to a life of activism including leading the Association of Ethiopian Jews.

== In popular culture ==
The fictional character Kabede Bimro (portrayed by Michael Kenneth Williams), in the movie Red Sea Diving Resort, is based upon Ferede Aklum.
