= List of ambassadors of Israel to Burundi =

== List of ambassadors ==
- Aharon Ofri (Non-Resident, Kampala) 1968–1971
- Chargé d'affaires Meir Joffe (Non-Resident, Kigali)
- Uri Lubrani (Non-Resident, Kampala) 1965–1967
- Michael Michael (diplomat) (Non-Resident, Kampala) 1962–1965
