= Antoine Lahad =

Leader of the South Lebanon Army during the Lebanese Civil War

Antoine Lahad أنطوان لحد
- أنطوان لحد
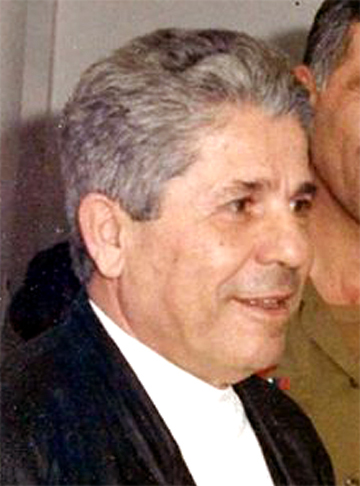
- Lahad c. 1988
- Born: 22 August 1927; Kfar Qatra, French Lebanon
- Died: September 10, 2015 (aged 88); Paris, France
- Military career
- Allegiance: Lebanon (1952–83); Free Lebanon (1984–2000)
- Branch: Lebanese Armed Forces; South Lebanon Army
- Rank: Major General
- Commands: Deuxième Bureau (Interim Head, 1966); Beqaa Regional Command (1971–75); South Lebanon Army (1984–2000)
- Conflicts: Lebanese Civil War; South Lebanon conflict (1985–2000)

Antoine Lahad (Arabic: أنطوان لحد, romanized: 'Anṭwān Laḥad; 22 August 1927 – 10 September 2015) was a Lebanese military officer who served as the leader of the South Lebanon Army (SLA) from 1984 until 2000, when the SLA withdrew from Southern Lebanon and was dissolved.

A Maronite Christian from the Chouf District, Lahad was a career officer in the Lebanese Armed Forces. He rose to the title of Major General, specialized in intelligence, and commanded key regions before his initial retirement.

In 1984, Lahad took command of the SLA following the death of its founder, Saad Haddad, with backing from former Lebanese President Camille Chamoun. He restructured the militia, integrating Lebanese Druze, Shia, and Sunni Muslim soldiers, expanding the overall rank-and-file force to include thousands of Lebanese militiamen. They fought alongside each other to regain control of Lebanese territory from Palestinian militant factions (and, subsequently, Hezbollah) which dominated much of southern Lebanon. Operating from Marjayoun, he coordinated with the Israel Defense Forces to maintain the southern security belt. He survived a 1988 assassination attempt, which left him partially paralyzed.

After Israel withdrew from southern Lebanon in May 2000, the SLA collapsed. He then lived first in Tel Aviv, Israel, and finally in Paris, until his death at 88 years of age in 2015.

== Early life ==
Antoine Lahad was born into a prominent Maronite Catholic family in 1927 in the village of Kfar Qatra, located south-east of Beirut within the Chouf District of Lebanon.

== Lebanese Armed Forces career ==
He pursued a career in the state armed forces, and graduated from the Lebanese Army Military Academy as a commissioned officer in the Lebanese Armed Forces infantry in 1952. Following his commissioning, he rose through the ranks of the state armed forces.

During his early career, Lahad specialized in intelligence and regional operations, serving as the assistant to the head of the Lebanese Deuxième Bureau (military intelligence) and as the vice commander of the South Lebanon region between 1954 and 1958. He was later appointed as the interim head of national intelligence for a brief tenure in 1966. He traveled to France to study at the general staff school in Paris in 1970, subsequently completing an advanced course of command studies at the École Supérieure de Guerre.

Upon returning to Lebanon, he assumed major regional commands, serving as the assistant commander and eventually the primary commander of the Beqaa region from 1971 until 1975, eventually achieving the senior rank of Lebanese Armed Forces major general before his subsequent retirement and crossover into regional militia leadership.

== South Lebanon Army career ==
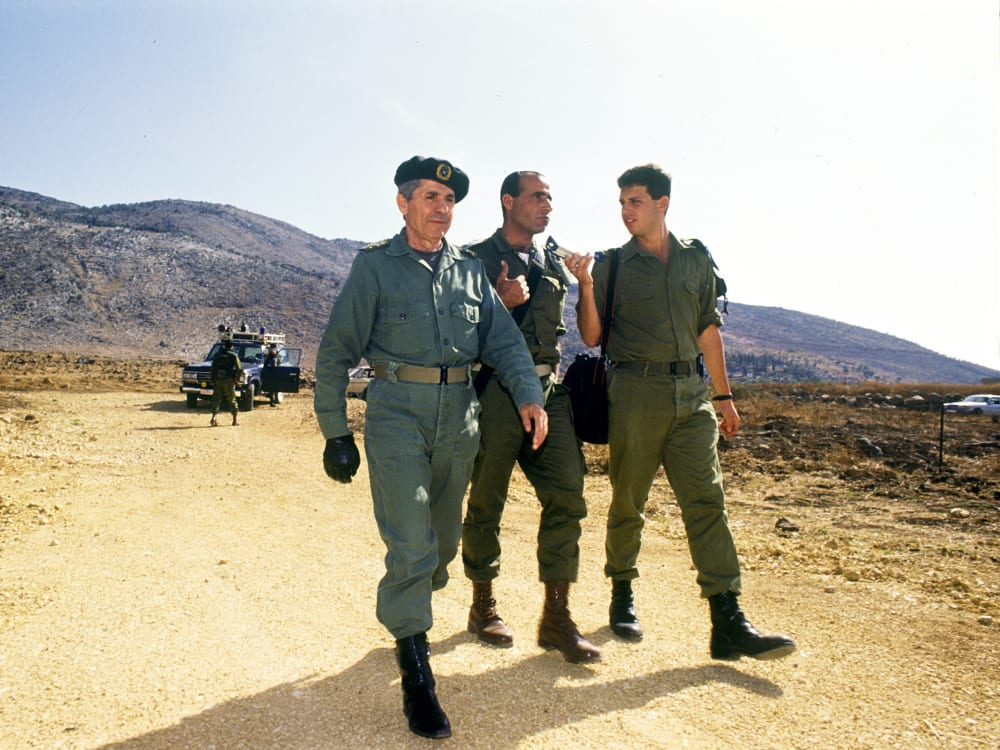
Lahad (left) with two South Lebanon Army members, in southern Lebanon (October 1990).

Following the death of the founder and leader of the South Lebanon Army (SLA) paramilitary force, Saad Haddad, from cancer in January 1984 during the Lebanese Civil War, the militia required new command. Lahad was selected as his successor, officially taking control of the faction in early 1984. Lahad accepted the position with the endorsement of former Lebanese President Camille Chamoun, and operated from the established military headquarters in Marjayoun.

Under his administration, the faction operated permanently under the name South Lebanon Army (SLA). While the group's command remained predominantly Maronite Christian, Lahad restructured operational units to integrate Druze, Shia, and Sunni Muslim soldiers, expanding the overall rank-and-file force to include thousands of Lebanese militiamen who fought alongside each other to regain control of Lebanese territory from Palestinian militant factions that dominated much of southern Lebanon. Armed and logistically supported by the Israel Defense Forces, Lahad’s SLA served as a strategic buffer securing Israel's northern border and executing counter-insurgency operations against regional militant factions, primarily countering the rising influence of Amal and Hezbollah.

He maintained open lines of communication with the capital of Beirut, hosting political and religious leaders from various Lebanese factions who sought his assistance on regional matters. He also reinstated the state salaries for official Lebanese Army soldiers stationed in the south, whose government funding had previously been cut off during the civil war.

On 17 November 1988, Lahad survived an assassination attempt by Souha Bechara, a 21-year-old operative of the Lebanese Communist Party. Bechara had embedded herself within Lahad's household in Marjayoun by working as an aerobics instructor for his family, and befriending his wife. On the evening of the attack, Bechara shot Lahad twice in the chest with a revolver, before she was apprehended by Lahad's security personnel. The shooting left Lahad in critical condition, requiring emergency evacuation and extended medical treatment at Rambam Hospital in Haifa, Israel. Though he survived, he suffered the permanent paralysis of his left arm and voice complications. Bechara was detained at the SLA's Khiam detention center in Lebanon, until her release in 1998 following human rights campaigns.

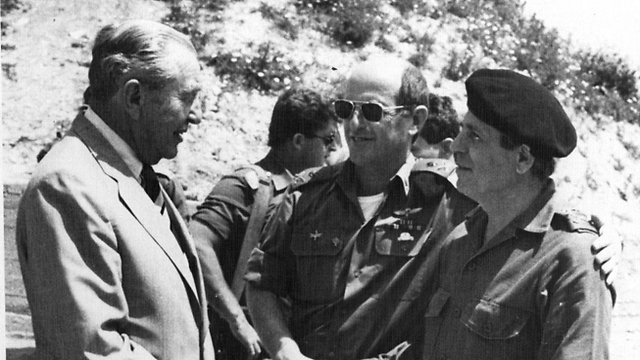
Antoine Lahad (right) with the President of Israel, Chaim Herzog, and the commander of the Northern Command Yossi Peled.

Throughout the 1990s, Lahad continued to command the South Lebanon Army as it sustained a war of attrition within the Israeli-declared "security zone" against Hezbollah and other militant factions.

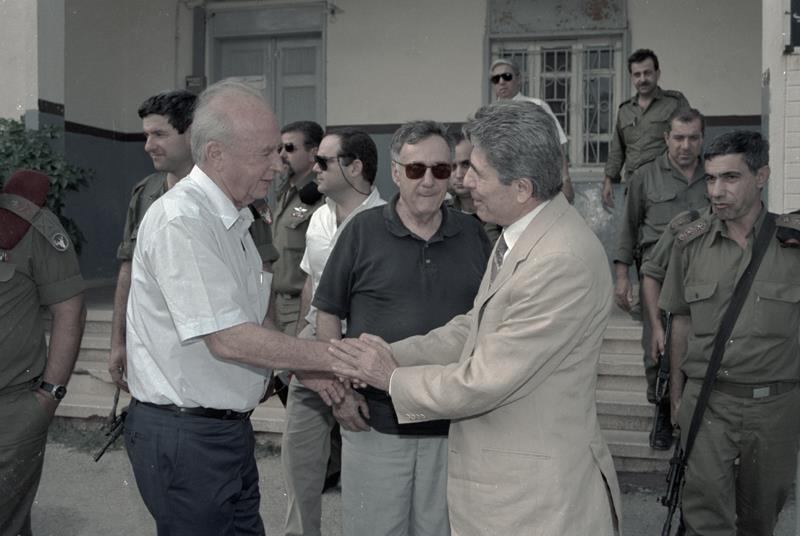
Shaking hands on the left Israeli Prime Minister Yitzhak Rabin, on the right Antoine Lahad, behind them Uri Lubrani, July 28, 1992.

Lahad was condemned to death by Hezbollah following Israel's occupation of southern Lebanon. Hezbollah required men traveling into southern Lebanon to sign written pledges promising not to visit or meet with Lahad or his personnel. His military headquarters were located at Marjayoun, an outpost that flew an Israeli flag flanked by two flags of Lebanon.

=== Israeli withdrawal and SLA collapse ===
When Israel withdrew from southern Lebanon in 2000, Lahad was determined to carry on against Hezbollah.

He pleaded for support to maintain the militia first from Israel, saying that if Israel were to send him money to pay his soldiers, provide logistical support and ammunition, and keep the border open so his wounded could be transported to Israel for treatment, he could "hold for 200 years." Lahad did not receive the support he asked for, and the South Lebanon Army collapsed following Israel's withdrawal from southern Lebanon. Panicked frontline SLA outposts abandoned their positions and thousands of militiamen and their families fled across the border into Israel to escape reprisal. At the exact time of the frontline collapse, Lahad was in Paris attempting to convince officials within the French Ministry of Foreign Affairs to deploy international peacekeeping troops to replace his militia force.

== Exile ==
=== Israel ===
Following the disintegration of his forces, Lahad fled to Israel and entered into exile. In a high-level meeting with Uri Lubrani, the Israeli Government Coordinator, in May 2000, Lahad expressed deep concern regarding the appropriate treatment and safety of SLA members who had crossed the border into Israel following the withdrawal. Contrary to contemporary media reports, Lahad stated that Israeli Prime Minister Ehud Barak had not tricked or betrayed Lahad. He highlighted the fundamental importance of his faction's long-standing cooperation with Israel, and cited UN Security Council resolution 425 as a legitimate framework for Barak's ultimate withdrawal of Israeli armed forces. Lubrani assured Lahad that all SLA members would receive appropriate care, and thanked him and his men for their "long struggle for peace".

Lahad initially moved to Israel, and lived in Tel Aviv. There, he operated a Lebanese restaurant named "Sinnara" for several years.

=== France ===
He later sought to relocate to France. However, the French government initially denied Lahad residency. He was later permitted to reside in France, in order to reunite with his family in Paris. Because he had direct family members already living in France, the French authorities ultimately permitted him to live in the country.

Lahad released a Hebrew-language autobiography in 2004, entitled In the Midst of a Storm: An Autobiography.

In November 2006, Lahad participated in an interview with the Israeli news outlet YnetNews. During the exchange, he opined that Syria was behind the assassination of Lebanese Industry Minister Pierre Amine Gemayel, stating:

I have no doubt about who assassinated Lebanese Minister Pierre Gemayel last week. It was the Syrians, there’s no question. It could be that one of their proxies in Lebanon carried out the actual assassination, but the order came from Damascus.

In May 2014, a Lebanese military court in Beirut sentenced him to death in absentia on charges of high treason.

== Death and legacy ==
On 10 September 2015, Lahad died in Paris at the age of 88 following a sudden heart attack. His death sparked intense controversy regarding his final burial location, as Lebanese authorities and certain political factions strongly opposed initial plans to repatriate his body to his home village of Kfar Qatra for a traditional funeral. His family ultimately canceled the Lebanese funeral services, and arranged for his burial in France. He was remembered by contemporary Israeli officials as a courageous and loyal partner who fought to defend his people and maintain a secure northern border.

== Portrayal in film ==
He is portrayed by Israeli actor Igal Naor in the 2026 American historical drama film Monument, directed by Bryan Singer.
