= Osnat Lubrani =

- אסנת לוברני
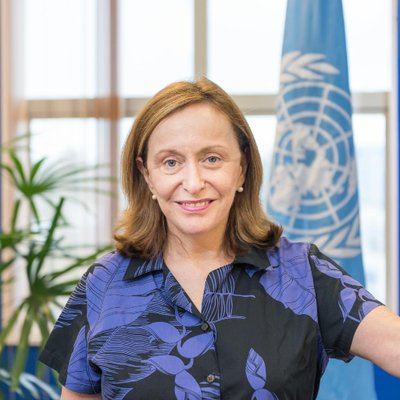
- United Nations Resident Coordinator Osnat Lubrani
- Born: Jerusalem, Israel Palestine

Osnat Lubrani (Hebrew: אסנת לוברני) is an Israeli-American diplomat. She served at the United Nations between 1998 and 2024 and held prominent roles, including UN Coordinator for Development and Humanitarian Aid in Ukraine, Kosovo, Fiji, and nine other island countries, as well as senior positions at UN Women.

== Early life and education ==
Lubrani was born into a family with an international focus and is fluent in Hebrew, English, and French. She earned a master's degree in international affairs from the School of International and Public Affairs, Columbia University and a master's in film and television production from New York University. She also holds a bachelor's degree in Anthropology and African History from the Hebrew University of Jerusalem.

She is the daughter of Israeli diplomat Uri Lubrani.

== International career ==
Lubrani began her career as a consultant on human rights and development in Rwanda and the Democratic Republic of Congo (formerly Zaire). She later served as regional director for Central and Eastern Europe at UNIFEM, where she also managed its liaison office in Brussels.

She worked with the United Nations Development Programme (UNDP) in Macedonia, contributing to crisis prevention and recovery initiatives. From 2009 to 2013, she was the UN Development Coordinator and UNDP Resident Representative in Kosovo, monitoring activities of the UN Mission in Kosovo (UNMIK).

Between 2013 and 2018, Lubrani served as the UN Resident Coordinator for Fiji, overseeing development programs in nine other small island states, including the Federated States of Micronesia, Kiribati, and the Solomon Islands. In 2018, she was appointed UN Humanitarian Coordinator in Ukraine, where she served until 2022.

== Publications ==
Full article: "Osnat Lubrani, a career at the United Nations spanning Ukraine, Kosovo, Fiji, and senior roles at UN Women", Haaretz, June 2024 (in Hebrew).

== See also ==
- 2022 Russian invasion of Ukraine
- Uri Lubrani
