= Yossi Peled =

Israeli general and politician

- יוסי פלד
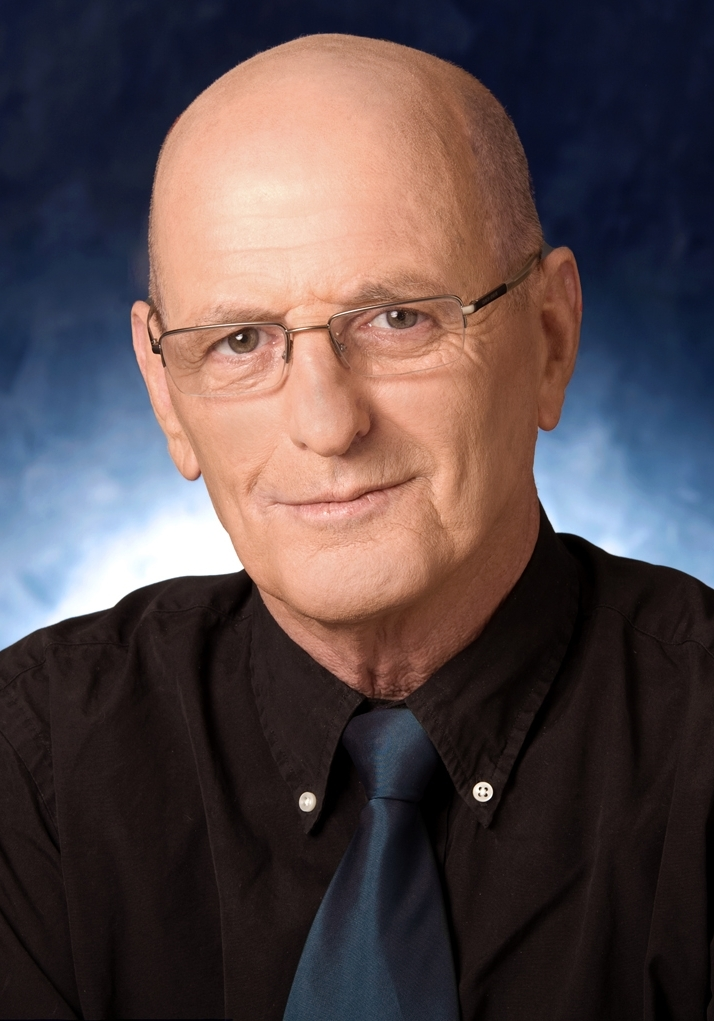

Ministerial roles
- 2009–2012: Minister without Portfolio

Faction represented in the Knesset
- 2009–2012: Likud

Personal details
- Born: 18 January 1941 (age 85) Antwerp, Belgium

Yossi Peled (Hebrew: יוסי פלד; born 18 January 1941) is an Israeli general and politician, the former Aluf of the Northern Command in the Israel Defense Forces.

== Biography ==
=== Early life ===
Yossi Peled was born Jozef (Jeffke) Mendelevich in Belgium. ("Jeffke," or Little Joe, is the diminutive form of the Flemish nickname for Jozef/Joseph). During World War II, he and his sister were adopted by a Catholic family. Except for his mother, all of his family was murdered in Auschwitz concentration camp during the Holocaust. After the war, his mother reclaimed him, and they made aliyah to what became Israel with the assistance of the Jewish Brigade.

Peled studied history at Tel Aviv University, gaining a BA, and later settled in kibbutz Negba.

He is divorced and the father of two children.

=== Military career ===
Peled served in the Israel Defense Forces for 30 years. During the Six-Day War, Peled was a company commander in the 9th Battalion of the 7th Armored Brigade of the 84th Armored Division, under General Israel Tal. In the War of Attrition, he served as a battalion commander on the Suez Canal.

In the Yom Kippur War, Peled was in command of the reservist 205th Armored Brigade, under the 146th Division commanded by Moshe Peled. His brigade moved from Jerusalem to the Golan Heights and engaged the Syrian Army on the northern front.

Later in the 1970s, Peled was placed in command of the 252nd Division in the Sinai Peninsula. In the First Lebanon War, he commanded a provision unit nicknamed Yossi's Force, east of Lake Qaraoun.

Peled's final military position was the command of the IDF's Northern Command, which he held from 1986 to 1991.

=== Government and political career ===
After working as the CEO of Tadiran Telecom, Peled has held numerous positions in government offices, not officially entering politics. In 1993, he was head of the Second Israeli Broadcasting Authority, as well as heading several government-appointed committees, including:

- Formulation of a plan for a government policy regarding communications (1996)
- Investigation of the causes and failures which led to the kidnapping of 3 soldiers by Hezbollah in Shebaa farms in October 2000
- Formulation of a policy for the treatment of South Lebanon Army personnel in Israel
- Investigation of the railway incident which left 5 dead near Beit Yehoshua (2006)

In 1996, Peled joined the Likud party and was a major supporter of Binyamin Netanyahu. For the 2009 elections he won fifteenth place on the Likud list, and entered the Knesset as the party won 27 seats. He was later appointed Minister without Portfolio in Netanyahu's government. However, he resigned from the Knesset on 16 September 2012, and left his ministerial post on 27 September. During his term as a minister, Peled reiterated his support for the Migron Bill, a bill that would give outposts in the West Bank immunity from destruction.

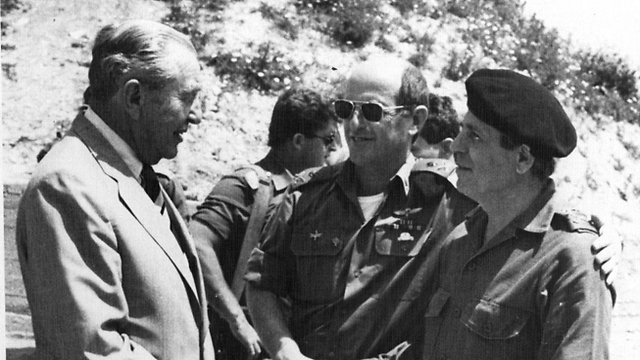
Israeli President Chaim Herzog, Yossi Peled, and South Lebanon Army commander Antoine Lahad (l-r).

In 2009, he expressed his support for the South Lebanon Army, saying that "we have a moral obligation to 600 families of South SLA in Israel". When South Lebanon Army commander Antoine Lahad passed away in 2015, Peled praised him as a "Lebanese patriot," and stated that "The State of Israel owes him a tremendous moral debt due to his years-long contribution to the security of the residents of south Lebanon and northern Israel."
