= Belaynesh Zevadia =

Israeli diplomat

- בליינש זבדיה
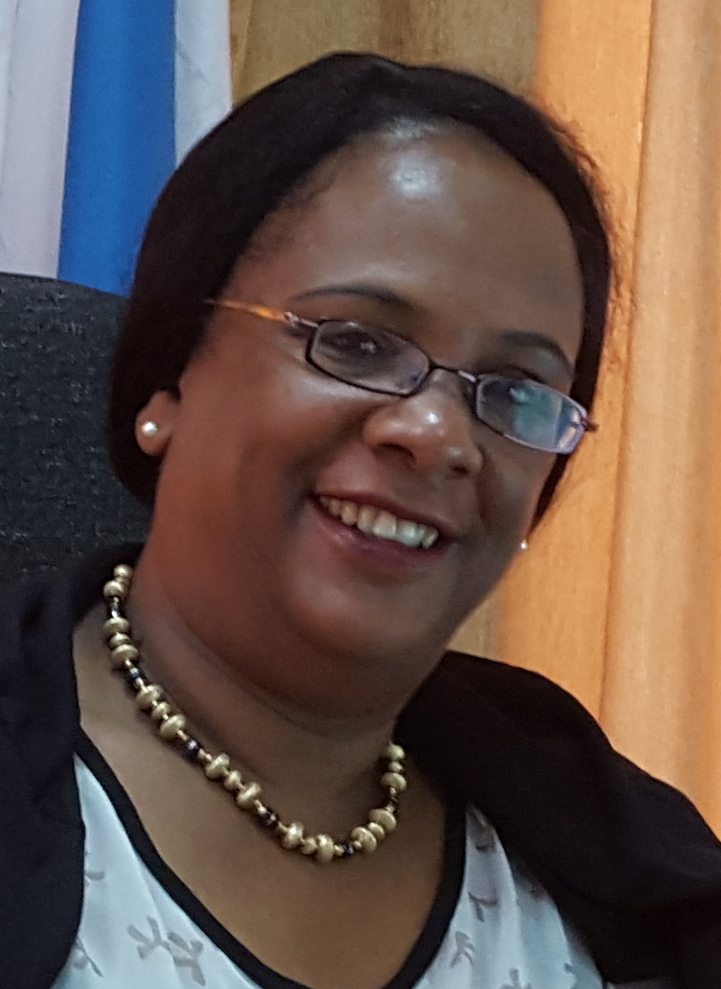
- Born: 1967 (age 58–59); Gondar, Ethiopia
- Education: Hebrew University of Jerusalem
- Occupation: Diplomat
- Known for: First Ethiopian-born Israeli ambassador
- Title: Ambassador

Belaynesh Zevadia (Hebrew: בליינש זבדיה; born 1967) is an Ethiopian-born Israeli diplomat. She was appointed Israeli ambassador to Ethiopia in 2012 and was the Israeli ambassador to Rwanda.

== Biography ==
Belaynesh Zevadia was born to a Jewish family in the Gondar region of Ethiopia. She immigrated to Israel in 1984 at the age of 17, during Operation Moses. She is a graduate of the Hebrew University of Jerusalem.

== Diplomatic career ==
Zevadia was the first immigrant from Ethiopia to enter the Israeli Foreign Service as a trainee, working at Israeli consulate posts in Houston and Chicago. In 2012, she was appointed ambassador to Ethiopia, becoming the first immigrant from Ethiopia to Israel to serve as an Israeli ambassador. By 2016, she was the Israeli ambassador to Rwanda.

== Honors ==
In 2014 Zevadia was honored as one of the torchbearers in the national Israeli Independence Day ceremony.

== See also ==
- Women of Israel
