= Operation Joshua =

1985 airlift of Ethiopian Jews to Israel

Operation Joshua, also known as Operation Sheba, was the 1985 airlifting of Ethiopian Jews from refugee camps in Sudan to Israel.

Ethiopian Jews had fled to refugee camps in Sudan from a severe famine in their country. The Israeli Operation Moses had previously airlifted 8,000 people to Israel from November 21, 1984, to January 5, 1985, but when word leaked out to the press, under pressure from other Muslim countries, Sudan blocked further flights, leaving many behind.

All 100 United States senators signed a secret petition to President Ronald Reagan, asking him to have the evacuation resumed. Vice President George H. W. Bush then arranged a follow-up mission called Operation Joshua. On March 22, 1985, six United States Air Force C-130 Hercules transport aircraft were dispatched, landing near Al Qadarif. "Around 500", "more than 500" or "around 650" Jews were located and transported to Ovda Airport in southern Israel.

== See also ==
- Aliyah from Ethiopia
- Operation Solomon
- Jewish Agency for Israel
