= Operation Moses =

1984 Israeli covert evacuation of Ethiopian Jews from Sudan during a civil war

Coordinates: 20°00′18″N 37°11′26″E

Operation Moses (Hebrew: מִבְצָע מֹשֶׁה, Mivtza Moshe) was the covert evacuation of Ethiopian Jews (known as the "Beta Israel" community from Sudan during a civil war that caused a famine in 1984. Originally called Gur Aryeh Yehuda ("Cub of the Lion of Judah") by Israelis, the United Jewish Appeal changed the name to "Operation Moses".

== History ==
The operation, named after the biblical figure Moses, was a cooperative effort between the Israel Defense Forces, the Central Intelligence Agency, the United States embassy in Khartoum, mercenaries, and Sudanese state security forces. Years after the operation completed, it was revealed that Sudanese Muslims and the secret police of Sudan also played a role in facilitating the mass migration of Ethiopian Jews out of Sudan. Operation Moses was the brainchild of then Associate U.S. Coordinator for Refugee Affairs, Richard Krieger. After receiving accounts of the persecution of Ethiopian Jews in the refugee camps, Krieger came up with the idea of an airlift and met with Mossad and Sudanese representatives to facilitate the Operation.

After a secret Israeli cabinet meeting in November 1984, the decision was made to go forward with Operation Moses. Beginning November 21, 1984, it involved the air transport by Trans European Airways of some 8,000 Ethiopian Jews from Sudan via Brussels to Israel, ending January 5, 1985.

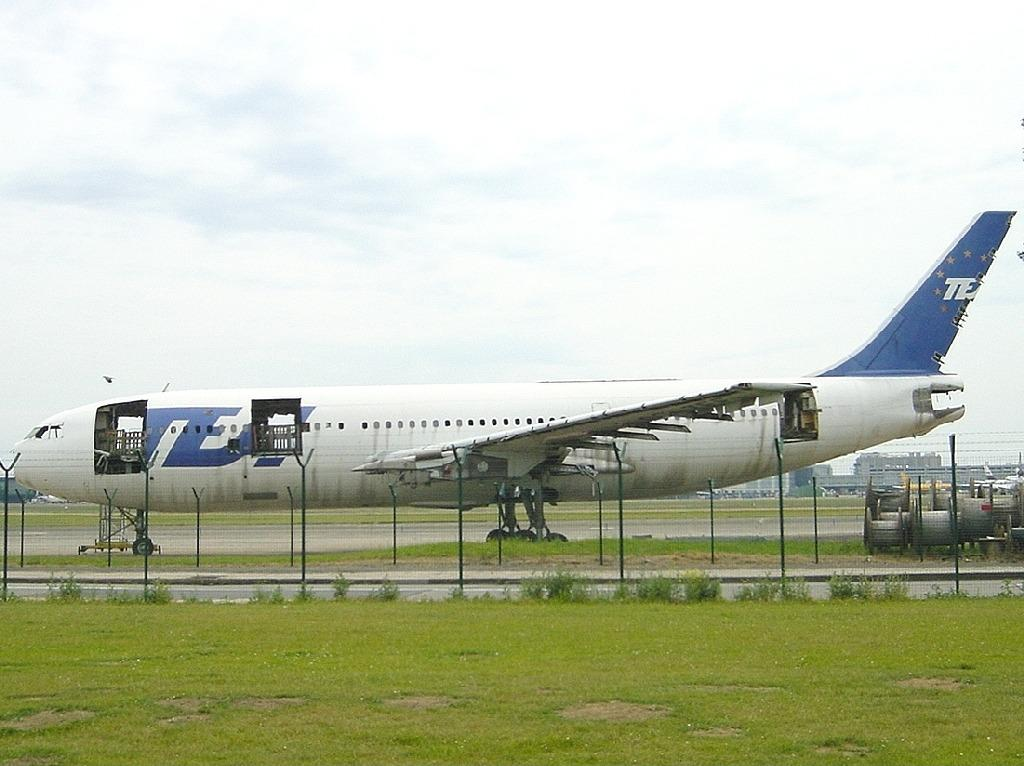
A TEA airplane

Over those seven weeks, over 30 flights brought about 200 Ethiopian Jews at a time to Israel. Trans European Airways had flown out of Sudan previously with Muslims making the pilgrimage to Mecca, so using TEA was a logical solution for this semi-covert operation because it would not provoke questions from the airport authorities. Before this operation, there were approximately as few as 250 Ethiopian immigrants in Israel. Thousands of Beta Israel had fled Ethiopia on foot for refugee camps in Sudan, a journey which usually took anywhere from two weeks to a month. It is estimated as many as 4,000 died during the trek, due to violence and illness along the way. Sudan secretly allowed Israel to evacuate the refugees. Two days after the airlifts began, Jewish journalists wrote about “the mass rescue of thousands of Ethiopian Jews.”

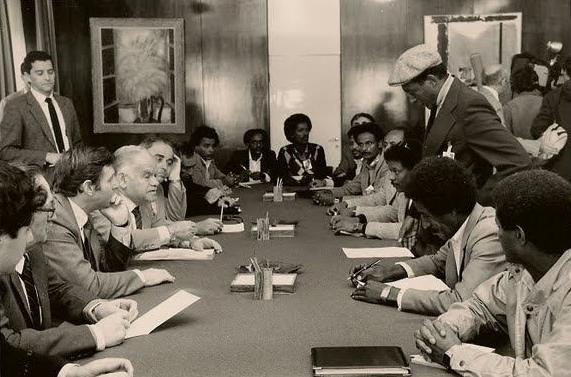
Ethiopian activists with Israeli PM Yitzhak Shamir

Operation Moses ended on Friday, January 5, 1985, after Israeli Prime Minister Shimon Peres held a press conference confirming the airlift while asking people not to talk about it. Sudan killed the airlift moments after Peres stopped speaking, ending it prematurely as the news began to reach their Arab allies. Once the story broke in the media, Arab countries pressured Sudan to stop the airlift. Although thousands made it successfully to Israel, many children died in the camps or during the flight to Israel, and it was reported that their parents brought their bodies down from the aircraft with them. Some 1,000 Ethiopian Jews were left behind, approximately 500 of whom were evacuated later in the U.S.-led Operation Joshua. More than 1,000 so-called "orphans of circumstance" existed in Israel, children separated from their families still in Africa, until five years later Operation Solomon took 14,324 more Jews to Israel in 1991. Operation Solomon in 1991 cost Israel $26 million to pay off the dictator-led government, while Operation Moses had been the least expensive of all rescue operations undertaken by Israel to aid Jews in other countries.

== Operation Dove Wing 2010; 2015–2022 ==
On 14 November 2010, the Israeli cabinet approved a plan to allow an additional 8,000 Falash Mura to immigrate to Israel.

In 2015 it was reported the number of Jews in Ethiopia was 4,000.

On 16 November 2015, the Israeli cabinet unanimously voted in favor of allowing the last group of Falash Mura to immigrate over the next five years, but their acceptance would be conditional on a successful Jewish conversion process, according to the Interior Ministry. In April 2016, they announced that a total of 10,300 people would be included in the latest round of Aliyah, over the following 5 years.

On 11 March 2021, 300 Ethiopian Jews went to Israel–the last of 2,000 Jews from Operation Tzur Israel which began in December 2020.

In 2021, the estimated number of Jews remaining in Ethiopia was about 100.

On 2 February 2022, the Israeli Supreme Court suspended Aliyah from Ethiopia.

On 1 June 2022, 180 Jews from Ethiopia made Aliyah to Israel as part of Operation Zur Israel to reunite 3,000 Jews in Ethiopia with their brethren in Israel.

On 14 June 2022, 500 Jews from Ethiopia made Aliyah to Israel.

== Cultural references ==
This operation was the subject of an Israeli-French film titled Live and Become, directed by Romanian-born Radu Mihăileanu. The film centers on an Ethiopian child whose Christian mother passes him as a Jew so he can immigrate to Israel along with the Jews in order to escape the famine that is looming in Ethiopia. The film went on to win the 2005 award for Best Film at the Copenhagen International Film Festival.

In the book World War Z by Max Brooks, the evacuation of African Jews to Israel in response to the outbreak of the titular epidemic is referred to as Operation Moses II.

The film The Red Sea Diving Resort is loosely based on the events of Operation Moses and Operation Joshua.

== See also ==
- Operation Magic Carpet (Yemen) 1949–1950 in Yemen
- Operation Mural 1961 in Morocco
- Operation Yachin 1961–1964 in Morocco
- Jewish Agency for Israel
- Ethiopian Jews in Israel
