= Operation Solomon =

1991 airlift of Ethiopian Jews to Israel

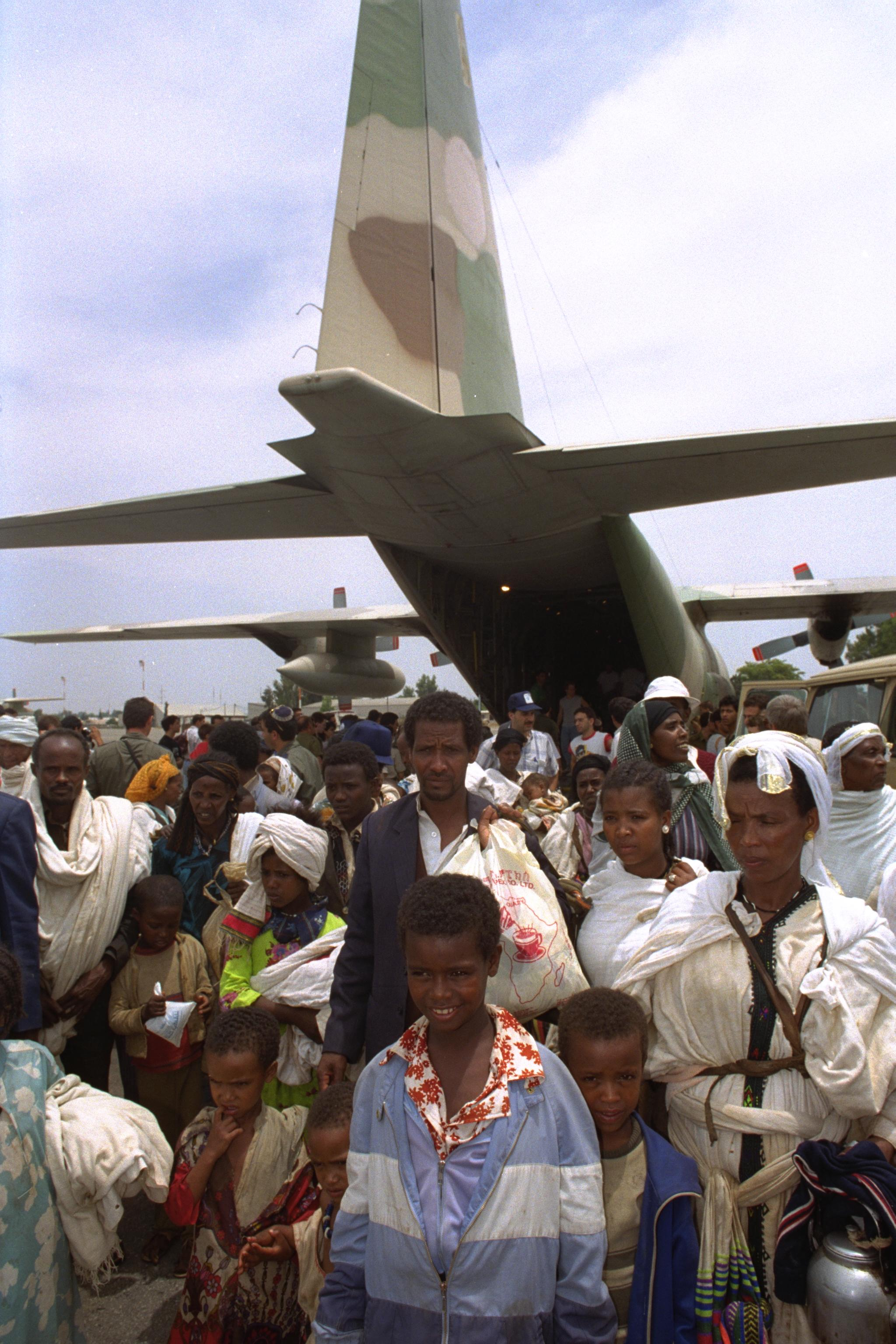
- Ethiopian Jews stepping out of the IAF's C-130, 25 May 1991
- Location: Ethiopia–Israel
- Planned by: Israeli government and Israeli Defense Forces
- Objective: To airlift Ethiopian Jews to Israel
- Date: 24 May 1991
- Outcome: Transported 14,325 Ethiopian Jews to Israel in 36 hours

Operation Solomon (Hebrew: מבצע שלמה, romanized: Mivtza Shlomo) was a covert Israel Defense Forces operation from May 24 to 25, 1991, to airlift Ethiopian Jews to Israel. Non-stop flights of 35 Israeli aircraft, including Israeli Air Force C-130s and El Al Boeing 747s, transported 14,325 Ethiopian Jews to Israel in 36 hours. One of the aircraft, an El Al 747, carried at least 1,088 people, including two babies who were born on the flight, and holds the world record for the most passengers on an aircraft. Eight children were born during the airlift process.

Operation Solomon was Israel’s third aliyah mission to airlift Ethiopian Jews to Israel. Two prior, similar missions, Operation Moses and Operation Joshua, were forced to cease after Ethiopia and Sudan pulled their quiet permission. In the interim period between the end of Operations Moses/Joshua and the start of Operation Solomon, only a minute number of Ethiopian Jews were able to leave Africa and emigrate to Israel.

== Background ==
In 1991, the sitting Ethiopian government of Mengistu Haile Mariam was close to being toppled with the military successes of Eritrean and Tigrayan rebels, threatening Ethiopia with dangerous political destabilization. Jewish organizations, including the American Association for Ethiopian Jews (AAEJ), and Israel were concerned about the safety and well-being of the Ethiopian Jews, known as Beta Israel, residing in Ethiopia. The majority were living in the Gondar region of the Ethiopian Highlands and were mostly farmers and artisans. The Mengistu regime had made mass emigration difficult for Beta Israel, and the regime's dwindling power presented an opportunity for those wanting to emigrate to Israel. In 1990, the Israeli government and Israel Defense Forces, aware of Ethiopia's worsening political situation, made covert plans to airlift the Jews to Israel. The United States became involved in the planning of Operation Solomon after it was brought to the US government's attention by American Jewish leaders of the AAEJ that Ethiopian Jewry was living in danger.

The US government was also involved in the organization of the airlift. The decision of the Ethiopian government to allow all the Falashas to leave the country at once was largely motivated by a letter from President George H. W. Bush, who had some involvement with Operations Joshua and Moses. Prior to this, Mengistu intended to allow emigration only in exchange for weaponry.

Also involved in the Israeli and Ethiopian governments' attempts to facilitate the operation was a group of American diplomats led by Senator Rudy Boschwitz, including Irvin Hicks, a Deputy Assistant Secretary of State for African Affairs; Robert C. Frasure, the Director of the African Affairs at the United States National Security Council; and Robert Houdek the Chargé d'Affaires of the United States Embassy in Addis Ababa. Boschwitz had been sent as a special emissary of President Bush, and he and his team met with the government of Ethiopia to assist Israel in arranging the airlift. Additionally, Assistant Secretary of State for African Affairs Herman Cohen played an important role as the international mediator to resolve the civil war in Ethiopia. Cohen struck a deal with Mengistu which promised improved relations with the United States if Ethiopia would reach an understanding with the rebels, change its human rights and emigration policy, and change its communist economic system. In response to the efforts of the diplomats, the acting President of Ethiopia Tesfaye Gebre Kidan made the ultimate decision to allow the Israeli airlift of the Ethiopian Jews. The negotiations surrounding the operation led to the eventual London roundtable discussions, which established a joint declaration by the Ethiopian civil war combatants who then agreed to organize a conference to select a transitional government. $35 million was raised by the greater Jewish community to pay the government in Ethiopia and the airport in Addis Ababa for the Ethiopian Jews to return to their ancestral homeland in Israel.

== Lead-up: internal debate within the Jewish community ==
In the decade leading up to the operation, there was a heated division within the Israeli community over whether to accept the Jewish status of the Ethiopians. The reasoning against bringing in Ethiopians proved to be very diverse. Some Jews within Israel feared a shanda fur di goyim (Yiddish: שאנדע פֿאר די גויים 'embarrassment in front of the non-Jews'), and thus aimed to avoid the issue of stirring up controversy by ignoring the pleas of the Ethiopian Jews. Others advocated for the operation, but avoided public demonstrations that might lead to arrests and further public controversy. Taking a completely different approach, others within the Israeli community claimed that there was a cultural divide which would make the integration process untenable; these included Director General of the Jewish Agency's Department of Immigration and Absorption Yehuda Dominitz, who likened this displacement to "taking a fish out of water". However, ultimately, these counter arguments were in vain, as the Israeli government went ahead and conducted the airlift regardless.

== Operation ==
The operation was overseen by the Prime Minister at the time, Yitzhak Shamir. It was kept secret by military censorship. Operation Solomon was sped up with substantial help from the AAEJ. In 1989, the AAEJ accelerated the process of the Aliyah because Ethiopian-Israeli relations were in a positive place. Susan Pollack, the director of the AAEJ in Addis Ababa, fought for an expedited commencement of Operation Solomon. Israel, which had a gradual plan for the operation, and the United States were given a graphic report from Pollack that informed both countries of the terrible conditions in which the Ethiopian Jews were living. The organization obtained transportation, including buses and trucks, to have the Jews of Gondar province quickly brought to Addis Ababa. To reach Addis Ababa, many Jews from Gondar had to venture hundreds of miles by car, horse, and on foot. Some Jews had their possessions stolen by thieves during their journeys, and some Jews were murdered. By December 1989, approximately 2,000 Ethiopian Jews made their way by foot from their villages in the Gondar highlands to the capital and many more came to join them by 1991.

In order to airlift as many Jews as possible, Israeli airplanes were stripped of their seats, and due to the low body weight and minimal baggage of the refugees, up to 1,086 passengers were boarded onto a single plane. May 24, 1991 also happened to be a Friday, which begins the Jewish Shabbat, during which transportation is not normally used. This made more vehicles available for the mission, as Jewish religious law permits breaking the Sabbath traditions for saving lives.

Many of the immigrants came with nothing except their clothes and cooking instruments, and were met by ambulances, with 140 frail passengers receiving medical care on the tarmac. Several pregnant women gave birth on the plane, and they and their babies were rushed to the hospital. Before Operation Solomon took place, many Ethiopian Jews were at a high risk of infection from various diseases, particularly HIV. Jews left behind in Ethiopia were at increased risk of infection due to rising rates of HIV. After a few months, approximately 20,000 Jews had made their way over. While they were in Addis, they were struggling for basic resources like food and warmth. They thought they would see their families right away.

Upon arrival in Israel, the passengers cheered and rejoiced. Twenty-nine-year-old Mukat Abag said, "We didn't bring any of our clothes, we didn't bring any of our things, but we are very glad to be here."

Operation Solomon airlifted almost twice as many Ethiopian Jews to Israel as Operation Moses. Between 1990 and 1999, over 39,000 Ethiopian Jews entered Israel.

=== World record ===
The operation set a world record for most passengers on an aircraft when an El Al 747 carried well over 1,000 people to Israel. The record itself is uncontested, but the exact number of passengers is unclear: Guinness World Records put the number at 1,088, including two babies who were born on the flight. It noted that contemporary reports cite numbers as low as 1,078 and as high as 1,122.

== Aftermath: Socioeconomic strife ==
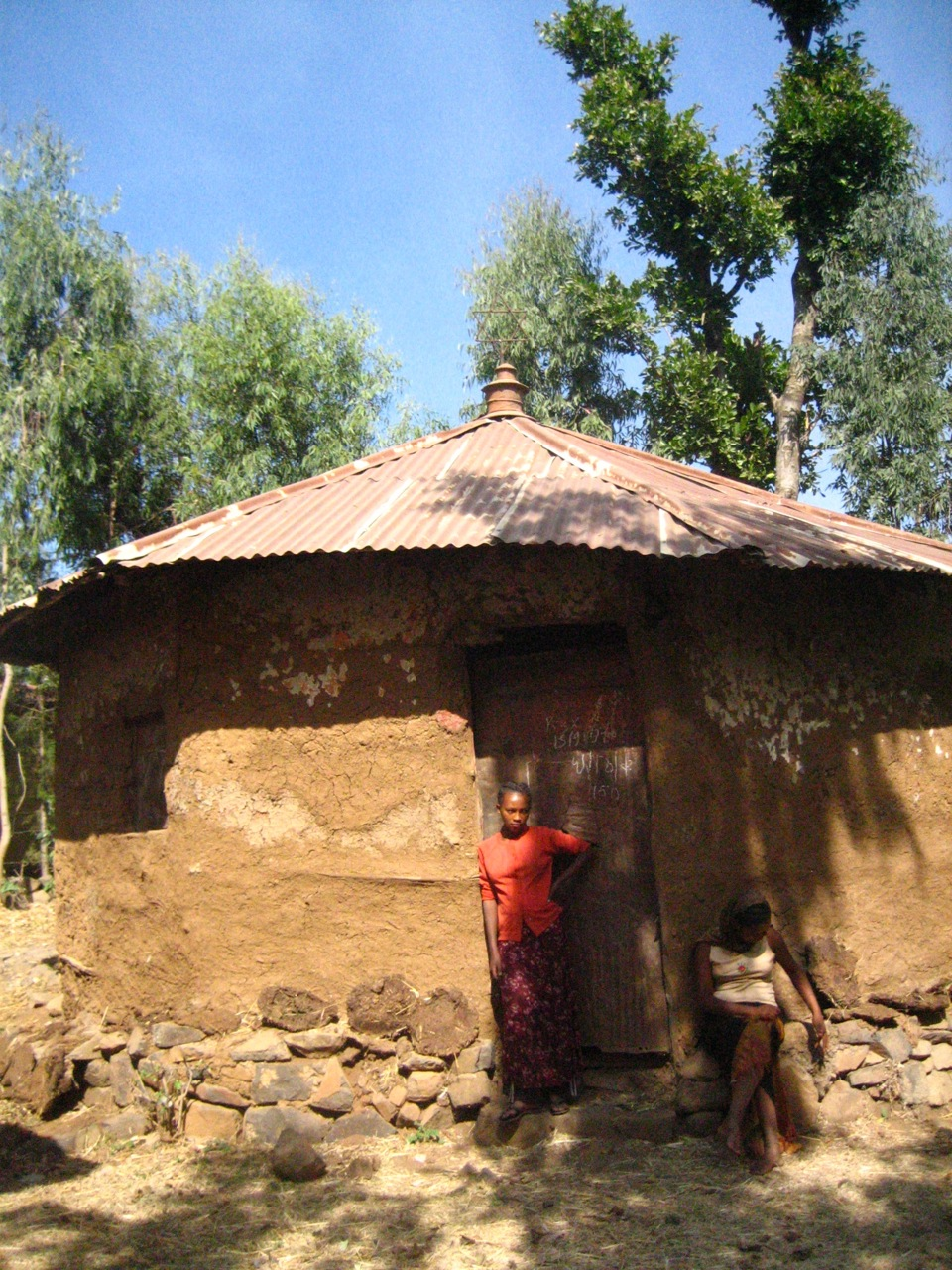
An abandoned synagogue in a Jewish village in Ethiopia. Following the complete exodus to Israel of the village’s inhabitants in 1991, the site became a tourist attraction in Ethiopia. No rural Jewish communities remained in Ethiopia after the transfer operation to Addis Ababa from 1988–1991

In the aftermath of the transports to Israel, the vast majority of Beta Israel immigrants struggled to find work. Estimates in 2006 suggested that up to 80 percent of adult immigrants from Ethiopia were unemployed and subsisting on Israel’s national welfare payments. Unemployment figures improved significantly by 2016, with only 20 percent of men and 26 percent of women being unemployed. This struggle can be explained by a number of potential factors. Firstly, the transition from the rural, largely illiterate lands of Ethiopia to a highly urban workforce in Israel has proved difficult, especially when considering the fact that most Ethiopian Jews do not speak Hebrew and are in competition with other, more highly skilled immigrant workers. Nevertheless, the younger generations of Ethiopian Israelis, who have grown up and been educated in Israel and possess graduate degrees and more forms of formal training, still have a disproportionate amount of trouble finding work.

== In popular culture ==
- Fig Tree (2018), directed by Alamork Marsha, is a film about her own experience with Operation Solomon.

== See also ==
- Jewish Agency for Israel
- Operation Joshua
- Operation Moses
- Operation Yachin
- Operation Ezra and Nehemiah
