= List of Israeli Independence Day torchbearers =

Civil honor

Independence Day Torchbearer
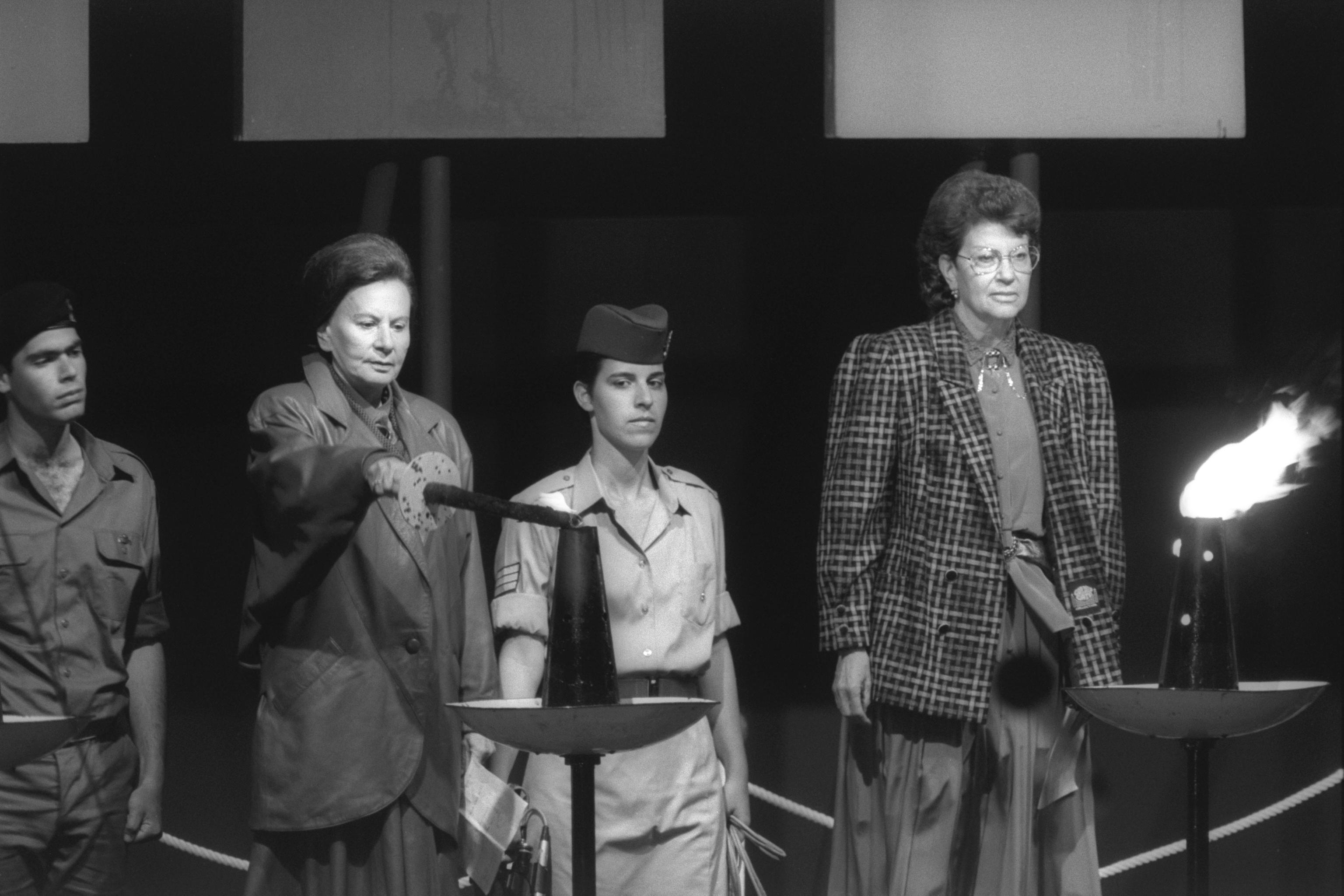
- Supreme Court justice Miriam Ben-Porat lighting one of the 12 beacons at Israel's 40th anniversary celebration (1988)

Awarded by the Ministry of Culture and Sport
- Type: Civilian decoration of Israel
- Established: 1949
- Country: Israel
- Eligibility: Israeli citizens and foreign nationals
- Awarded for: Extraordinary civic contribution to society
- Status: Active
- Founder: Government of Israel
- Website: Official website

Precedence
- Next (higher): none
- Related: Medal of the Knesset; Israeli Presidential Medal of Honour

Being a torchbearer in Israel's annual torch-lighting ceremony that marks the national transition from Yom Hazikaron (Remembrance Day) to Independence Day is one of the highest civic honors conferred upon individuals by the State of Israel.

There are traditionally twelve torchbearers, one to light each of the ceremonial twelve torches symbolizing the Twelve Tribes of Israel. Up to two torches may be designated for joint lighting, allowing for a maximum selection of fourteen total torchbearers. This limit has been relaxed during periods of national crisis or historical milestones, such as the October 7 attacks, where the 2024 ceremony featured 44 torchbearers.

== Selection process ==
The selection of torchbearers is managed by the Ministry of Culture and Sport under the auspices of the Ministerial Committee for Symbols and Ceremonies. The Director of the Ministry's Information Center forms a public advisory council and issues a public call for nominations aligned with the ceremony's annual theme. A dedicated selection committee—composed of representatives from the Knesset, the Prime Minister's Office, the ministerial committee, and the public—reviews submissions to finalize the roster.

Per government regulations, torchbearers must demonstrate an extraordinary civic contribution to society. Nominees are typically Israeli citizens or residents, though exceptions may be granted for non-citizens with a profound connection to the event's theme. The final group is structurally balanced to ensure comprehensive representation across the population.

== Ceremony ==
Prior to the ceremony itself, the Speaker of the Knesset meets with all of the torchbearer's for that year's ceremony, and presents them with the Israeli state decoration, the Medal of the Knesset. The ceremony starts at the grave of Theodore Herzl on top of Mount Herzl in Jerusalem. The Speaker of the Knesset lights one initial torch, and from this first torch a total of 12 additional torches are lit aflame to symbolize the Twelve Tribes of Israel. Every Independence Day, the bearers of the torches are selected to highlight key periods of time within the history of the country. They emphasize Israel's efforts to remain an independent and sovereign nation.

== History ==
The ceremony on Mount Herzl lighting the torch for Israeli Independence Day is the earliest and most famous traditions in the country recognizing the start of the holiday. From the first Independence Day celebration in Israel through the year 1952, the torch lighting consisted of only one person, who was the Speaker of the Knesset. Politician Shlomo Lavi was the first to openly request the Knesset to proclaim the importance of Israeli Independence Day. Through this act, the Knesset tied the event itself within their parliamentary purview. The first Knesset Speaker to light the torch was Yosef Sprinzak. The tradition dated back to the May 1949 celebration of Independence Day, where the lighting of the torch had not yet become an official state act. This was followed by the reinternment of Theodore Herzl's grave on Mount Herzl on 17 August 1949. The celebration of Hanukkah in December 1949 again utilized the torch theme, with members of the youth movement Gadna running to and from locations in the nation's history up to Mount Herzl for the lighting of a large Hanukkah menorah. The first formal Independence Day torch lighting took place in 1950, and was influenced by the Hanukkah motifs. The Speaker of the Knesset lit the initial single torch, and then members of the Gadna movement subsequently followed this with a marathon run to light similar torches across the country.

The 1998 ceremony was marked by a sister satirical torch lighting from the labor political group, Yesh Gvul. The group held an alternative event to the official state event, one kilometer from the actual ceremonial site, for several years. Their event's torchbearers highlighted disadvantaged groups, low income, disabled individuals, and those advocating for human rights. Their 1998 event took place opposite the street from the Prime Minister's Office at Emil Grunzweig Square. Their first torch at the parody event was lit by Israeli politician, Shulamit Aloni.

The 2015 ceremony was historic for its inclusion of Arab-Muslim television presenter Lucy Aharish as a torchebearer at the invitation of the Prime Minister of Israel; she gave a speech at Mount Herzl in Arabic.

== Analysis ==
The Israeli parliament the Knesset official website acknowledged that the torchbearers, "should be people who have made an extraordinary contribution to society and the state." The Times of Israel noted that the honor was, "considered one of Israel’s most prestigious accolades". The Jewish Telegraphic Agency pointed out that being selected as a torchbearer was, "seen as one of Israel's most significant honors".

== Torchbearers by year ==
=== 20th century ===
Year	Theme	Torchbearers	References
1949	Single torchbearer	Yosef Sprinzak	
1950	Single torchbearer	Yosef Sprinzak	
1951	Single torchbearer	Yosef Sprinzak	
1952	Single torchbearer	Isaiah Press	
1953	Representatives of diaspora communities and ethnic communities from across the country		
1954	Representatives of diaspora communities and ethnic communities from across the country		
1955	Representatives of diaspora communities and ethnic communities from across the country	Yitzhak Eliyahu (Youth torch – Jerusalem) • Abraham Elmaleh (Old Yishuv – Jerusalem) • Zechariah Moshe Ben Moshe (Yemen – Kfar Yavetz) • Abraham Harpaz (England – Samaria) • Bat-Sheva Libner (Belgium – Givat Brenner) • Yosef Shafer (Hungary – Kfar Hahoresh)	
1956	Representatives of diaspora communities and ethnic communities from across the country		
1957	Representatives of diaspora communities and ethnic communities from across the country	Moshe Bahar (Egypt – Machaneh Yisrael) • Edmondo Barmak (South America – Haifa) • Reuven Gamzon (France – Herzliya) • Haim Haferit (North Africa – Azzata) • Moshe Weiss (Hungary – Kvutzat Yavne) • Harold Salzman (South Africa – Beersheba) • Yaakov Michaelson (Poland – Migdal HaEmek) • Haim Nashpitz (Russia – Haifa) • Yahya Samidi (Yemen – Megiddo) • Raouf Samah (Iraq – Ramat Gan) • Zvi Yehuda Kook (Old Yishuv – Jerusalem) • Mordechai Shamir (Cochin, India – Meslat Zion)	
1958	Representatives of diaspora communities and ethnic communities from across the country	Aryeh Lubin	
1959	Representatives of diaspora communities and ethnic communities from across the country	David Amid (Iran) • Nahum Ashkenazi (veteran Yishuv – Yesod HaMa'ala) • Helena Bar (Poland) • David Hoffman (Hungary) • Werner Hecht (Switzerland) • Yosef Hartom (Italy) • Aryeh Ziv (South Africa) • Dan Yeshayani (Prisoner of Zion, Romania) • Meir Kahlon (Libya) • Yosef Perlmutter (Argentina) • Amram Sophia (Morocco) • Yahya Karni (Yemen)	
1960	100th anniversary of Herzl's birth – 12 torchbearers: 6 veteran Zionists and 6 representatives of immigrant communities	Martin Buber • Berta Berger • Yitzhak Gruenbaum • Yosef Tunik • Cornel Iancu • Yosef Cohen • Mordechai Nurock • Richard Siman-Tov • Eliyahu Abed (Hebron) • Murray Rosenberg • Alberto Romano • Gizela Schey	
1961	Children born on 5 Iyar 5708 celebrating their bar mitzvah on the date of the ceremony		
1962	Representatives of manual laborers		
1963	Year of the Pioneers – representatives of the 12 moshavot founded before 1891	Kadish Luz (Degania Bet) • Negba David (Mikveh Israel) • Meir Romem (Ness Ziona) • Giora Shochat (grandson of Yehuda Raab, founder of Petah Tikva) • Chava Tamari (Mishmar HaYarden)	
1964	Illegal immigration	Shlomo Dagan (Bulgarian Jewish community)	
1965	17 torches marking 17 years of the state, under the theme of volunteering for the Jewish Battalions, the Jewish Brigade, and Mahal fighters		
1966	18th year of the state – sons and daughters of fighters in the War of Independence	Atzion Ben-Nekht • Yael German • Dorit Henegbi • Dror Zeigerman • Tzameret Harlap • Ruth Yafe • Niva Livne • Yosefa Simbol • Ilana Seri • Ehud Inbar • Ruth Shiloni • Nira Shinbaum	
1967	Representatives of the 11 settlements established in the Negev in 1947 and the first child born in Beersheba	Shmuel Avni • Abraham Eisenberg • Yoav Altman • Shimon Anshi • Nissim Ben Aryeh • Israel Brand • Hana Goldstein • Mordechai Glitzenstein • David Harar (Tkuma) • Shulamit Lev • Zvi Keren (Hatzerim) • Yitzhak Shamir	
1968	Representatives of jubilees and security events	Abraham Avigdorov • Michael Ben-Ari • Rachel Yanait Ben-Zvi • Haim Hazaz • Sid Cohen • Shalom Cohen • Havka Folman Raban • Meir Kumrov • Hanna Rovina • Pinhas Rosen • Yosef Yoel Rivlin • Haim Moshe Shapira	
1969	Representatives of frontier settlements		
1970	12 boys and girls from front-line communities	Ziv Ofir • Smadar Blaeski • Rotem Danieli • Dani Zait • Yitzhak Yehuda • Peleg Mor • David Malka • Malka Nitzan • Nir Ofer • Rivka Roz • Haran Rivlin • Daniel Shoshan	
1971	Representatives of Soviet immigrants and veteran immigrants from Arab countries		
1972	Representatives of diaspora communities and 2 young Sabras		
1973	Heroes of Israel (25th anniversary of independence)	Abraham Avigdorov • Leah Ben-Tal • Yochai Ben-Nun • Emil Brieg • Eliyahu Gana • Yaakov Horvitz • Abraham Zibel • Ben Zion Litner • Arieh Atzmon • Gedalyahu Armoni • Ron Feller • Ilana Karniel	
1974	6 representatives of IDF branches and 6 representatives of frontier settlements		
1975	Volunteerism and personal example in the civilian sector	Mohsen Dagesh	
1976	Young people carrying the banner of connection with the Jewish diaspora		
1977	Sons and daughters of Jerusalem, its defenders and fighters	Eldar Avidar (representing Armored Corps) • Ben Zion Avni (representing Civil Guard) • Yosef Avni (representing Etzel) • Yossi Ohana (representing Jerusalem Brigade) • Sigal Almog (girl born on 28 Iyar) • Amos Gol (representing Paratroopers Brigade) • Aviva Gusarsky-Kaplan (representing Harel Brigade) • Yael Miuhas (representing the generations of Jerusalem) • Moshe Mashalei (representing the Jewish Quarter) • Akev Salman (representing Etzioni Brigade) • Yerachmiel Atzion (representing Haganah) • Zvi Shoami (representing Lehi)	
1978	12 descendants of fighters for the establishment of Israel (30th anniversary of independence)		
1979	Peace treaty with Egypt and the continuity of the Yishuv in the Land of Israel	Haim Yissakhar Abulafia • Menashe Elishar • Oded Burla • Hanan Varker • Hamda Zinder • David Zinti • Yissakhar Luria • David Koren • Asher Eliezer Rivlin • Iri Richi • Amihood Schwartz • Daniela Shamir	
1980	People of science, industry and agriculture	Amatzya Abudram • Rahamim Avizeda • Tamar Gal • Eliezer Gun • Dan Katz • Daniel Levi • Yitzhak Levi • Yitzhak Meshulem • Dan Ratter • Israel Pollak • Meir Kumrov • Rachel Shalon	
1981	Representatives of the educational enterprise in Israel	Corinne Biton • David Benvenisti • Zefania Drori • Ali Muhammad Kharib • Kalman Yakov Man • Shoshana Sofer • Abraham Satri • Annette Kadmon • Shlomo Kodesh • Agnes Keleti • Naomi Tavori	
1982	100 years of settlement since the First Aliyah – descendants of the founders	Yardena Elmakiyes • Mati Ariel • Nimrod Ben Aharon • Inbar Goldstein • Hani Gisin • Orit Ganor • Uziya Hovav • Danit Frag • Amit Friedman • Efrat Freiman • Amos Peretz • Nadav Tsabari	
1983	Heroism of Israel	Yosef Avidar • Ziva Arbell • Yehoshua Cohen • Yaakova Cohen • Ben Zion Litner • Rafael Saban • Milya Flazenstein • Yonatan Frieden • Moshe Kravitz • Simcha Rotem • Gad Shahar • Sara Shimooni	
1984	Unity of Israel	Leon Ashkenazi • Sara Danieli • Uri Talmor • Ali Yahya • Zvi Labritz • Benjamin Levin • Hanna Levin • Nazia Faro • Bracha Kapach • Alex Kalbitzky • Ilma Radai • Mordechai Tamir	
1985	Development of science and technology	Yona Oshpiz • Uzia Galil • Ovadia Harari • Orna Zaken • Nikola Elias Yanaki • Asher Cohen • Benjamin Mazar • Zvi Suzin • Rahamim Antabi • Zvi Tsur • Moshe Koller • Abraham Klair	
1986	Democracy in Israel	Yohanan Ben-Yaakov • Tzvia Bar Zion • Samir Darwish • Zerach Warhaftig • Shlomo Zamir • Yehoshua Tan-Pai • Doris Lavie • Moshe Landau • Nitzan Nuriel • Moshe Piamenta • Teddy Kollek • Alice Shalvi	
1987	Branches of the arts in Israel	Ashera Elkaim Ronen • Abdallah Al-Kara • Shlomo Bor • Shlomo Bar Shavit • Aharon Goldberg • Yitzhak Graziani • Danny Verete • Sami Michael • Rivka Miriam • Ilona Feher • David Reznik • Zahara Shatz	
1988	40 years of the State of Israel, principles of the Declaration of Independence	Suleiman Al-Qrinawi • Erez Biton • Miriam Ben-Porat • Devorah (Debby) Golan • Aharon Ziv • Marcelle Ninio • David Polonsky • Ilet Keren • Herzl Rosenblum • Emanuel Rackman • Moshe Sasson	
1989	Mass immigration to Israel (40 years since 1949)	Sam Avital • Shoshana Adler • Chava Alberstein • Menachem Luzia • Eliezer Marcus • Glenda Sword • Haim Zadok • Yosef Tzaraf • Eliezer Kusherovsky • Rivka Rosenzweig • Ephraim Shilo • Orna Shram-Kahana (on behalf of her grandfather, Rabbi David Kahana)	
1990	Year of the Hebrew language	Reuma Eldar • Arieh Elias • Haim Be'er • Yosef Bigon • Ze'ev Ben-Haim • Dola Ben-Yehuda Wittmann • Adnan Garkad • Rafael Siton • Reuven Sivan • Dina Patigo • Sylvie Partok • Miriam Ruth	
1991	Aliyah and absorption	Helena Avergomov • Michael Ofor • Akiva Orgad-Unger • Grigory Alperens • Yehudit Bialer • Zimena Birhane • Nitmar Halel • Ida Marcus • Yosef Farhi • Miriam Friedler • Dora Peretz • Arieh Karol	
1992	500 years since the expulsion from Spain	Rafael Abravanel • Nissan Ben Abraham • Sam de Costa • Dafna Don-Yihya • Aliza Toledano-Cohen • Matilda Cohen Sarano • Ayelet Malul • David Nahmias • Yosef Kaplan • Haim Rafael • Yehuda Taggar	
1993	Year of Jerusalem	Musa Abu Ghosh • Anat Altman • Yaakov Ben-Yehuda • Dan Benaya Seri • Tamar Bergman • Didier Gutel • Haika Grossman • Wolf Davidkin • Ruth Lapidoth • Joran Larson • David Cassuto • Hedva Rosenberg Ish-Shalom	
1994	Environmental quality	Salman Abu Rokon • David Avihail • Nava Isrov • Hussein Al-Hayeb • Haim Elias • Yehuda Bronicki • Arieh Vasterreich • Amotz Zahavi • Hagar Tzigler • Hadasa Kain • Shulamit Shamerling • Yosef Tamir	
1995	Year of peace tourism	Arieh Arzi • Bracha Ben Eli • Rachel Goldberg • Yossi Hochman • David Vilk • Tzvia Hashmonai-Bloch • Tony Morgenstern • Alfonso Nussbaumer • Shmuel Federman • Raaya Farhat • Reut Rabahon-Spiegel • Antoine Shahin • Sano Sharaf	
1996	Education and industry	Baruch Abramzon • Meni Brazili • Lea Gottlieb • Israel Goralnick • Yoel Gat • Klara Vinokurov • Moshe Visglas • Dov Lautman • Yaron Levnat • David Suissa • Rahab Abd al-Halim • Aliza Amir-Zahar • Vladik Kushnurov (age 9, whose parents were killed in the Route 18 bus bombing in Jerusalem)	
1997	A hundred years of Zionism	Yaakov Elias • Moshe Benziman • Peretz Hochman • Zaki Zaher • Ora Zer • Emanuel Cohen • Shulamit Cohen-Peretz • Rivka Lankhi • Alona Laryonova • Anat Madmoni • Asaf Mordechai • Alisa Nili Rafael • Zion Shankur	
1998	50th anniversary celebrations	Yoeli Or • Matilda and Moshe Azoulay • Aharon Davidi • Sorin Hershko • Yaakov Khodorov • Houda Kheir • Moshe Mushkowitz • Mekist Mengasha • Roi Marciano • Tal Sela • Tzemah Samadar • Irena Zeitlin • Hadasa Shamir • Mazal Sherira	
1999	The Knesset – symbol of democracy and sovereignty	Hana Avnor • Adi Efraimi • Michal Ashkenazi • Yosef Burg • Yoav Blachsan • Tuvia Vaxman • Rivka Tulker • Denis Lev • Aida Salah Abu Sweid • Edna Solodar • Mital Kapach • Mordechai Kremnitzer • Nurit Ron • Elimelech Ram • Dov Shilansky	
2000	Different but equal – together in a diverse social and cultural fabric	Tova Ilan • Zahava Baruch • Diab Khattar • Or Tokiev • Aharon Cohen • Yoram Cohen • Boaz Kitain • Jackie Levy • Daniela Aisa • Maryuma Klein • David Rubner • Ruth Reznik • Ziv Shahar	

=== 21st century ===
Year	Theme	Torchbearers	References
2001	Year of volunteering in Israel	Sasson Elias • Henry Alkslalsi • Lital After • Yaakov Bukhbut • Yulia Betayev • Esther Herlitz • Bracha Zisser • Sharona and Gil-Ad Shalit • Ruti Yitzhak • Nash Mimat • Uri Slonim • Nili Portugez • Nahum Frankel • Haim Roth	
2002	Children and youth – the future and strength of the State of Israel	Vered Ifargn • Yuri Gershevitch • Didi Daboush • Meir Eliran Harush • Asaf Zohar • Lior Teller • Azano Mazal Makonen • Abdullah Salah • Inbal Pizaro • Kobi Tzorf • Anya Kolgov • Ben-Hur Kikian • Mirav Rachel Shahaf	
2003	United in heart and linked arm in arm	Tomer Adar • Rami Biton • Klara Beiler • Natalie Gaiduk • Lawrence Gozlan • Baruch Desta • Shalom Drai • Yitzhak Zahavi • Jihad Hassan • Yael Mangem • Yehuda Meshi-Zahav • Sodi Namir • Naomi Nalbadian • Eliezer Paran • Yoram Shalit	
2004	Competitive and recreational sport in Israel	Taher Abu Leil • Alex Averbuch • Eli Ohana • Yael Arad • Ron Bolutin • Tal Brody • Miki Berkowitz • Keren Leibovitch • Avi Muyyal • Shimon Mizrahi • Ian Froman • Lee Korzits • Ralph Klein • Esther Roth-Shahamorov • Michal Shahar (daughter of Kehat Shorr, shooting coach killed at the Munich Olympics) • Mordechai Spiegler	
2005	"Life's Calling"	Aryeh (Lova) Eliav • Yeruselem Almu • Metuka Benjamin • Charles Bronfman • Zion Bar-Yitzhak • Ruth Gillis • Edi Triger • Nadia Cohen • Patsy Landa • Hilik Magnus • Amal Nasrallah • Ziad Saadi • Azzam Azzam • Haim Peri • Yitzhak Tsror • Yechiel Kadishai	
2006	Development of the Negev and Galilee	Eli Alaluf • Doron Almog • Dorit Almaliah • Shmulik Ben-Shalom • Yehuda Dekel • Stef Wertheimer • Jamila Khir • Sara Hatan • Esther Luzzatto • Natasha Liametz • Zachariah Liraz • Ruth Kaplan • Shaul Shasha	
2007	40 years since the reunification of Jerusalem	Mordechai Eliav • Nava Ben-Zvi • Yehuda David • Ruth Cheshin • Yosef Liberman • Avinoam Mor-Haim • Yitzhak Navon • Eliahu Sacharoff • Rachel Saad • Ori Amedi • Fares Faraj • Shulamit Kishik-Cohen • Joseph Schenker • Abraham Yehuda Shriki	
2008	Children of Israel: 60th anniversary	Sana Elbaz (with Fahoum Fahoum) • Ralph Goldman (with Shmuel Falik) • Yitzchak Dovid Grossman (with Tamir Abukasis) • Ronny Douek (with Pnina Nivetzag) • Naftali Deri (with Yael Barzilai) • Avichai Hayun (with Salman Nabuani) • Uri Jakobovitch (with Reuven Bentolila) • Erika Landau (with Zurarish Weba) • Yitzhak Kadman (with Niv Caspi) • Pnina Klein (with Oren Almog) • Hadara Rosenblum (with Genia Grishkov) • Galila Ron-Feder Amit (with Ronni Akerman)	
2009	Tel Aviv Centennial	Chaim Adler • Kobi Oz • Menachem Gutman • Amikam Gurevitch • Evgenia Dodina • Shula Vidrich • Angelica Yoavov • Oren Cohen • Shlomo Lahat • Lea Majaro-Mintz • Younes Nazarian • Michal Meron • Yair Rotlevi	
2010	"If you will it, it is no dream" * Herzl's 150th birthday	Ram Belinkov • Sara Braverman • Avraham Greenzeid • Dalia Dorner • Asher Hirsh • Ira Khaitin • Avraham Yitzhak • Amnon Lavie • Zvi Levanon • Yosef Matanes • Tal-El Filo • Yossi Feldman • Ariel Feldstein • Raya Strauss	
2011	"Guarantors for one another" – Year of mutual responsibility	Omer Bar-Lev • Gadi Bashari • Michael Goldman-Gilead • Barbara Goldstein • Zahava Dankner • Matityahu Drobles • Orit Dror • Zeev Dashevsky • Rachel Zikri • Hoshea Friedman • Shimon Rosenberg • Arij Raqab • Sa'ar Shapira • Yuvi Tashome-Katz	
2012	Water – the source of life	Esther Avraham • Maya Brown • Ruvik Danilovich • Alex Vizhnitser • Moshe ("Moshik") Cohen • Lior Lefebvre • Uri Moran • Herzl Naor • Ramtin Sabti • Orit Skutelsky • Shlomo Zweifler • Menachem Rabahon • Hana Rosenfeld • Giora Shaham	
2013	National heritage	Eliyana Elbaz • Alean Al-Krenawi • Meir Buzaglo • David Blumberg • Bilha Ben-Eliyahu • Iris Halperin-Peleg • Ran Hedvati • Agata Palczyk • Dov Zur • Muki Tsur • Rino Zror • Tamar Ross • Dafna Shimshon • Danny Shapira	
2014	The Era of Women – Achievements and Challenges * all-women torchbearers	Orna Barbivai • Pascale Bercovitch • Adina Bar-Shalom • Belaynesh Zevadia • Miriam Zohar • Gal Yosef • Geula Cohen • Carmela Menashe • Hindia Suleiman • Shahar Pe'er • Maxine Fassberg • Miriam Peretz • Tali Peretz-Cohen • Kira Radinsky	
2015	Israeli trailblazers	Lucy Aharish • Or Assouline • Danny Gold • Marta Weinstock-Rosin • Rami Levy • Gal Lusky • Avihu Medina • Rafi Mehudar • Alice Miller • Gabriel Idan • Malka Puterkovsky • Dan Korkowsky • Ehud Shabtai • Sima Shine	
2016	Civilian heroism	Rotem Elisha • Yaakov Arenfeld • Herzl Biton • Hillel Bareli • Gabi Barshishat • Avi Tubin • Nili and Moish Levi • Alison Bersen • Gabriel Naddaf • Fainy Sukenik • Anan Falah • Roberto Peraza • Rona Ramon	
2017	50 years since the reunification of Jerusalem	Din Argil • Miri Ehrental • Yehoram Gaon • Marvin Hier • Chana Henkin • Yaakov Hetz • Eli Mizrahi • Uri Malmilian • Michael Steinhardt • Yeros Yerushalayim Shigut • Dina Samata • Ahmed Eid • Eli Amir • Amnon Shashua	
2018	A legacy of innovation	Shlomo Artzi • Yeshayahu Gavish • Racheli Ganot • Noam Gershony • Margalit Zinati • Muwaffaq Tarif • Ruth Kahanoff • Roi Levy • Marcelle Machluf • Aviezri Fraenkel • Avshalom Kor • Mai Korman • Lea Koenig • Ze'ev Revach	
2019	"Only because of the wind"	Hodaya Oliel • Hila Hadas • Salman Zarka • Marie Nahmias • Avi Nesher • Shai Siman-Tov • Yehuda Poliker • Jeff Finkelstein • Gil Shlomo • Morris Kahn • Kfir Damari • Menashe Zalka • Moran Samuel • Iris Yifrach • Bat-Galim Shaer • Rachelle Fraenkel	
2020	Connections in Israeli society	Reina Abitbul • Hisham Ibrahim • Adi Altschuler • Israel Almasi • Ahmed Balauna • Eli Ben-Shem • Yael Viluzhny-Azoulay • Uri Cohen • Yasmin Mazaui • Lori Palatnik • Galia Rahav • Idan Raichel • Tzipi Shavit	
2021	"Brotherhood, for we are brothers"	Narjas Abu Yamen • Maher Ibrahim • Shira Isakov • Ofri Butbul • Adi Gozi • Yaish Giat • Dror Dicker • Eden Tapet Habetinesh • Tzipi Harpenes • Maor Cohen • Abie Moses • Shlomi Shabat • Gabriela Sztrigler Lew • Eitan Shnerb	
2022	"An outstretched hand in brotherly and sisterly love"	* Angel Alon * Mika and Uri Banki * Simcha Gathon * H. (commander of Yamam) * Yoram Yair * Hadar Cohen * Kalman Samuels * Munir Madi * Idan Kliman * Rita * Asael Shabo * Elizaveta Sherstuk * Yael Sherer	
2023	Pioneering	Sylvan Adams • Salah Eliyahu • Shalom Asayag • David Blatt • Vered Ben-Saadon • Dvir Diamond • Nina Weiner • Sivan Yaari • Reut Amichai • Khetam Hussein • Yehudit Negosa • Avigdor Kahalani • Ofek Rishon • Avraham Rivkind	
2024	Israeli heroism	Security Forces: Maj. Shavit Ben Moshe (IDF), Amir Cohen (Israel Police), Y. (Shin Bet), Deputy Supt. Y. (IPS Metzada), G. (Mossad); Rescue Forces: Oshrit Haddad (MDA), Tamar Shlezinger (United Hatzalah), Norit Eran Cohen (ZAKA), Yoel Demri (Fire & Rescue); Advocacy: Yoseph Haddad, Ella Kenan, Nathaniel Buzolic; Readiness Units: Inbal Lieberman (Nir Am), Barak Shalom (Alumim), Avichai Eliya (Havat Yair), Tal Levit (Metula); Rescue: Yosef Alziadna, Shahar Butskhak, Tali Nahum, Rami Davidian, Daniel Sharabi; Shield: Boaz Levy, Pini Yungman, Shaul Levi, Ygal Erlich; Hope: Ori Megidish, Varda Pomerantz, Liat Nefesh; Medical & Rehabilitation: Anat Ben Dor, Gaya Tzuberi, Dan Schwarzfuchs, Dikla Matzliach, Yossi Erblich, Sharon Alroy-Preis; Spirit of Victory: Ezra Yakin, Iris Haim, Raviv Kaner, Ivri Lider, Haïm Ulliel; Giving: Miriam Cohen, Bat Sheva Dadon, Basma Hano, Chen Arbel Marinberg, Shir Goldstein, Tzilit Yakovson; Diaspora: Debra Silverstein, David Meyer; The Missing: Empty space symbolizing 132 remaining hostages	
2025	Bridges of hope	Hostages: Emily Damari, with empty space symbolizing 59 remaining hostages; IDF: Faiz Fares, Inbar Ben Simon, Raz Ben Simon, Hagit Alon-Alharrar; Mutual Responsibility: Shai Graucher, Haib Taib, Orly Robinzon; Bridge to the World: Natasha Hausdorff, Omri Casspi, Ben Shapiro; Strength of Spirit: Rachel Edri, Makhluf Ohana, Rafael Arvas; Generation to Generation: Eli David, Ben Karso, Levana Zamir; Power of Perseverance: Deni Avdija, Gal Hamrani, Oren Smadja; Rehabilitation & Healing: Yarin Ilovitch, Elisha Madan, Jenny Svidia; Community Bridge: Racheli Tadesa Malkai, Riki Siton, Shmuel Slotki; Israeli Soundtrack: Dana International, Zehava Ben, Micha Shitrit; Giving: Itzik Akrish, Blanka Gut; Shadows: D., N., R. (Mossad)	
2026	Powers of renewal	Moshe Edri • Roni Insaz Parshad • Dina Ben-Yehuda • Assaf Granit • Avraham Zarbiv • Ora Hatan • Javier Milei • Ta'amar Atallah • Gili Raanan • Ari Spitz • Gal Hirsch • Talik Gvili • IDF Torch: Lieutenant Colonel M. • Nurit Rokah	

== See also ==
- Independence Day (Israel)
- List of Israelis
- List of Israeli Nobel laureates
- List of Israel Prize recipients
- List of people by nationality
- Politics of Israel, List of Knesset members
- Culture of Israel, Music of Israel
- Orders, decorations, and medals of Israel
