= Yael Bar Zohar =

Israeli actress, television host, and former model

Yael Bar Zohar יעל בר זוהר
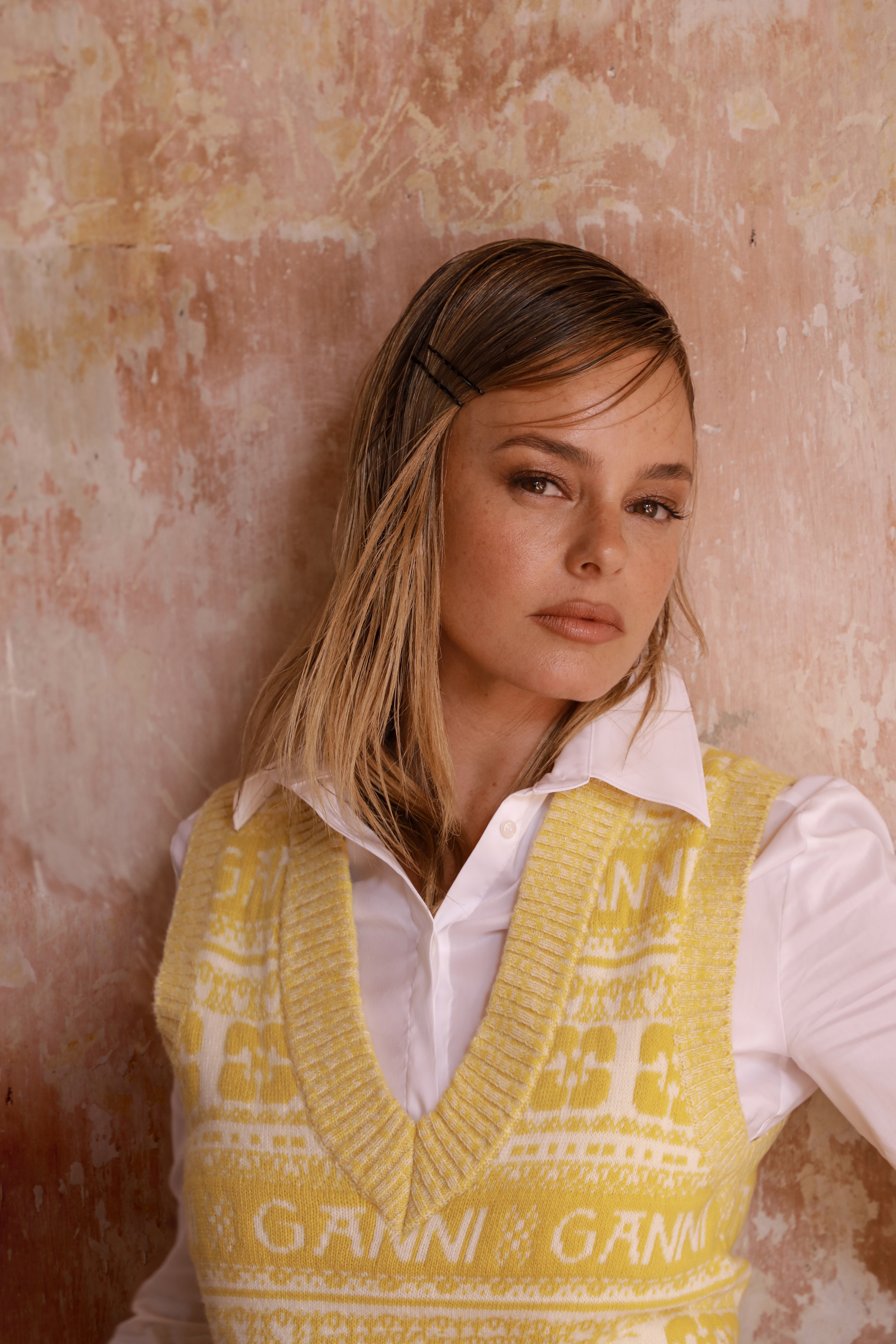
- Bar Zohar in 2023
- Born: January 29, 1980 (age 46); Tel Aviv, Israel
- Spouse: Guy Zu-Aretz (m. 2005)
- Children: 3

Yael Bar Zohar (Hebrew: יעל בר זוהר; January 29, 1980) is an Israeli television host, model, singer and actress.

== Early life and career ==
Bar Zohar was born in Tel Aviv, Israel, to a Jewish family. Her Polish-born father Menachem Bar Zohar immigrated to Israel, and he is of Ashkenazi Jewish descent. Her mother Ella Fogel-Bar Zohar is Israeli-born. She has an older sister named Michal.

She was enlisted to the Israel Defense Forces in 1999, on an 'excellent artist/performer' clause. Bar Zohar served as a producer in the filming unit of the Israeli Air Force, although she ended her military service after a year (instead of the mandatory two for girls).

She started her modeling career wearing bathing suits in a swimwear catalogue, and filmed a commercial at the age of 15. She was cast for a role in the popular soap opera Ramat Aviv Gimmel. She then turned to modelling She made her musical theater debut in the Israeli play Mary-Lou, based on songs by Israeli singer Svika Pick. In 2005, she starred as Belle in the Israeli premiere of Beauty and the Beast.

She has acted as 'mistress of ceremonies' for a group wedding in 2006.

She volunteers at the "LeMa'anchem" nonprofit organization, which provides medical consultation.

== Personal life ==
Bar Zohar was previously in a relationship with Israeli actor and model Yehuda Levi, her co-star in the soap opera Ramat Aviv Gimel. and also with Gil Sassover.

In September 2005, Bar Zohar married Israeli actor and television host Guy Zu-Aretz. They have three children, and reside in Ramat HaSharon, Israel.
