= Eliahu Sacharoff =

Haganah member (1914–2018)

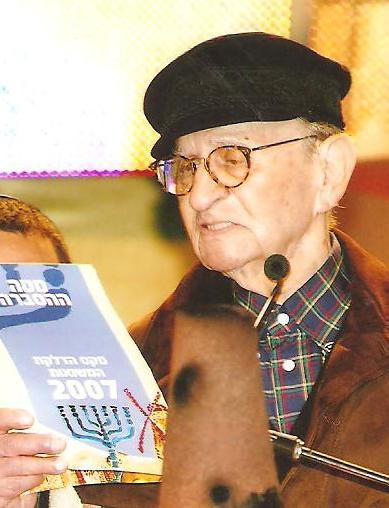
Eliahu Sacharoff

Eliahu Sacharoff (Hebrew: אליהו סחרוף; 1914–October 30, 2018) was a member of the Haganah who, on 8 October 1943, was sentenced by a military court in the British Mandate of Palestine to seven years' imprisonment after being found guilty of possessing more ammunition than his firearm license allowed.

The mayor of Tel Aviv gave evidence as a defence witness and said that he approved of the Haganah as a defensive organization to protect life and property.

According to the president of the court, W. Russell Lawrence, Sacharoff was tried and convicted under Regulation 8C (b) Emergency Regulations, 1936 (as amended) for being in possession of two rounds, one of which was of a special kind stolen from a consignment delivered to the Suez docks in February 1943. According to this account, documents in Sacharoff's possession showed him to be directly linked to the conspirators who had carried out the theft.

In 2007 Sacharoff was honored as one of the torchbearers in the national Israeli Independence Day ceremony.
