= ICRF =

ICRF can refer to:

- International Coalition for Religious Freedom, a group affiliated with the Unification Church
- Imperial Cancer Research Fund, a cancer research organization in the United Kingdom
- International Celestial Reference Frame, a reference frame in astrometry and astronomy
- Investigative Committee of the Russian Federation, a law enforcement agency in Russia
- Israel Cancer Research Fund, a North American charitable organization that supports cancer research in Israel
- Ion cyclotron resonance frequency
