= Galila Ron-Feder Amit =

Israeli children books author (born 1949)

- גלילה רון־פדר-עמית
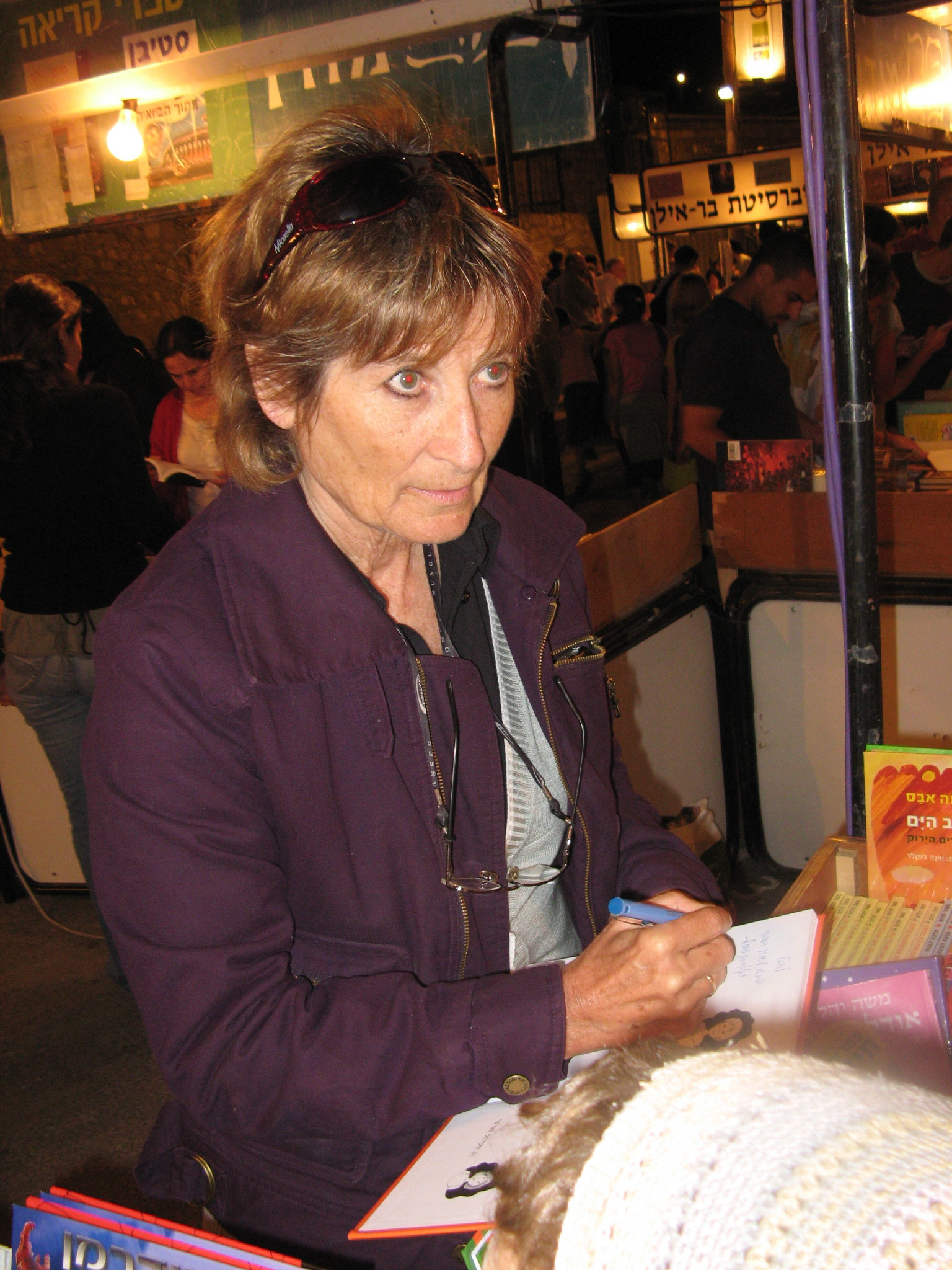
- Galila Ron-Feder Amit in 2008
- Born: October 12, 1949 (age 76); Haifa, Israel
- Occupation: Novelist
- Writing career
- Notable work: Jingi series

Galila Ron-Feder Amit (Hebrew: גלילה רון־פדר-עמית; born 1949) is an Israeli children books author. She has written 400 books, as well as television and film scripts. She also published a children`s nature magazine, and served as editor of a science magazine for young readers.

== Biography ==
Galila Ron was born in Haifa in 1949. She studied at the Hebrew Reali School and earned a degree in Bible and Hebrew Literature at the Hebrew University of Jerusalem. After her marriage to Avi Feder ended in divorce, she married Meshulam Amit. She has three children of her own from her first marriage, and ten foster children, taken in from broken homes.

== Literary career ==
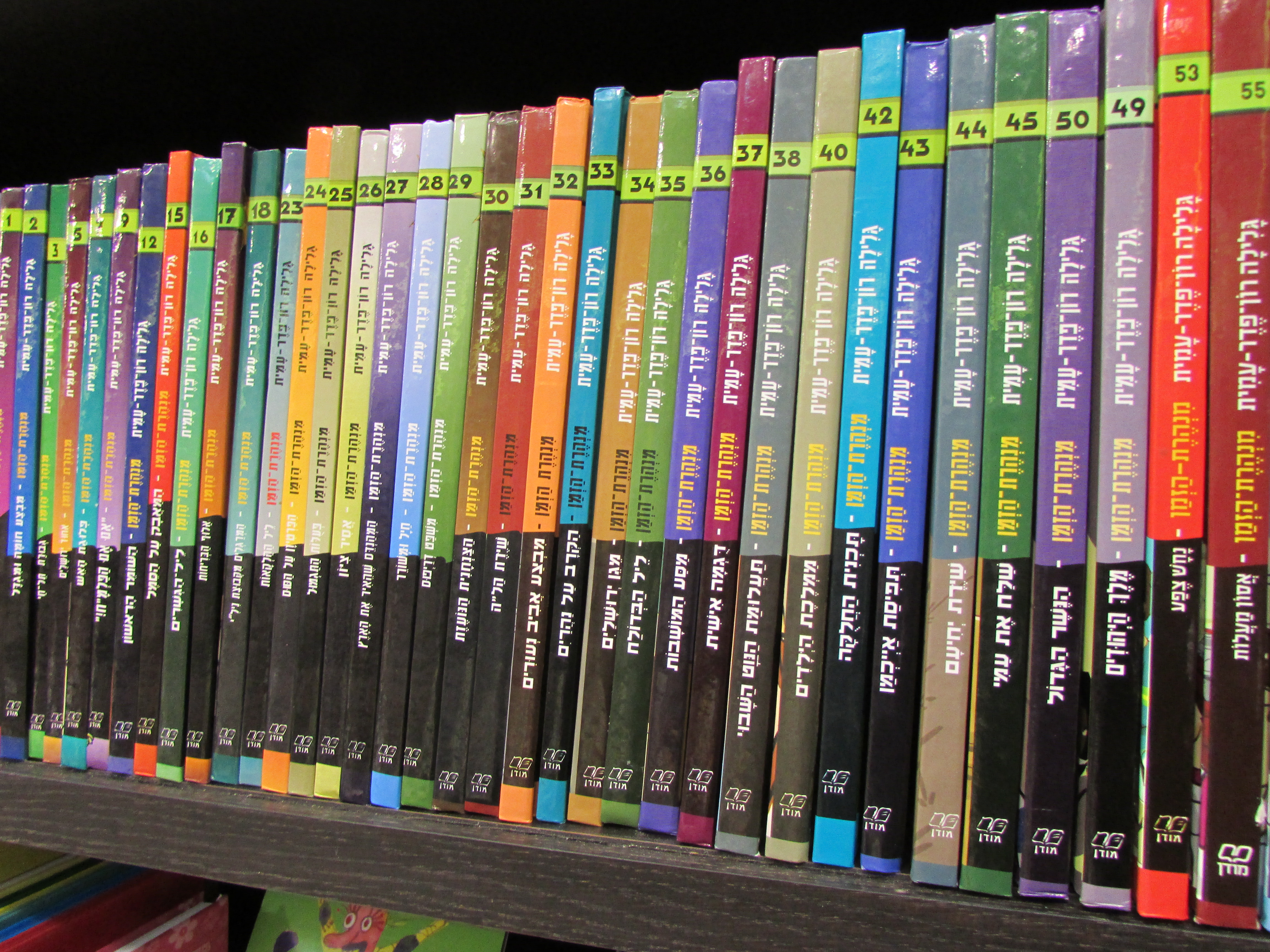
Books by Galila Ron-Feder Amit

Ron-Feder published her first book in 1971. She is the author of many books for children that have become Hebrew classics, among them the Gingi (Hebrew: ג'ינג'י) series and Tuli Ta'alooli (Hebrew: טולי תעלולי). In 1972, she began publishing a children's nature magazine. She was also the editor of a science magazine for young readers.

== Awards and honors ==
A film based on her experiences as a foster mother, To Myself, won First Prize at the Lucas children's film festival in Frankfurt.

In 2008 Ron-Feder was honored as one of the torchbearers in the national Israeli Independence Day ceremony. That year she also received the World Zionist Organization Award for Lifetime Achievement and Social Involvement.

In 2018, Ron-Feder was a recipient of the Prime Minister's Prize for Hebrew Literary Works.

In 2022, Ron-Feder Amit received the Yakir Yerushalayim award.

In 2025, President Isaac Herzog's office named her among the nine recipients of the Presidential Medal of Honour.

Further awards are listed on her page on the Israeli Institute for Hebrew Literature website (here).

== Published works ==
- The Time Tunnel - a children's adventure series about two Jerusalem children who travel back in time to historical events related to the establishment of the State of Israel and the history of the Jewish people (86 volumes).
- International Mission - a children's adventure series about Israeli children who travel to different countries and participate in various missions.
- Ṭaʻut, 1978
- To myself, 1987
- Yesh ishah aḥeret, 1994
- Ziyafnu kol kakh, 1995
- Meshuḥreret la-ʻuf, 1997
- Caro Me Stesso, 1999
- Retsaḥ be-tsameret ha-mishṭarah, 1999
- Ima shel tarmilaʼi : sipur ahavah opṭimi, 2002
- Le journal de Fanny, 2011
- Omrim ahavah yesh : sipuro shel Ḥayim Naḥman Byaliḳ, 2012

== See also ==
- Hebrew Writers Association in Israel
