= Sharon Alroy-Preis =

Official in the Israeli Health Ministry

- שרון אלרעי פרייס
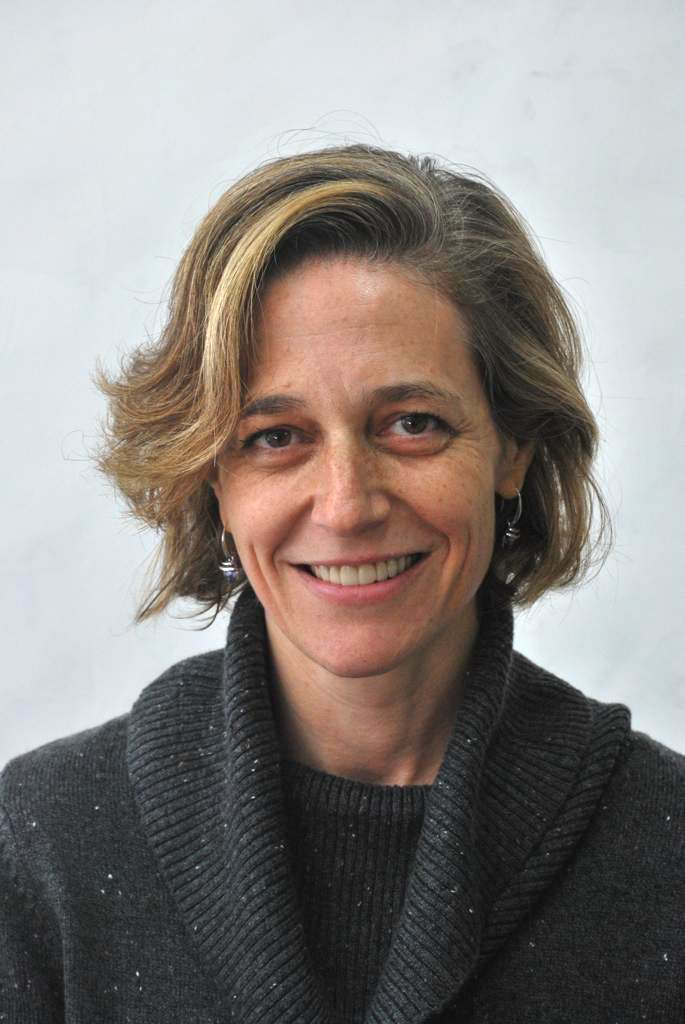
- Education: Technion – Israel Institute of Technology (M.D.); Dartmouth Institute for Health Policy and Clinical Practice (M.P.H.)
- Known for: Chief Epidemiologist of Israel
- Scientific career
- Fields: Epidemiology, public health
- Institutions: Israeli Health Ministry, Carmel Medical Center

Sharon Alroy-Preis (Hebrew: שרון אלרעי פרייס) is the head of public health services at the Israeli Health Ministry, and is Israel's chief epidemiologist.

== Education ==
Alroy-Preis holds a doctorate in medicine from the Technion and a master's degree from the Dartmouth Institute for Health Policy and Clinical Practice (division of Dartmouth College).

== Career ==
Alroy-Preis was deputy CEO of the Carmel Medical Center in Israel and the State Epidemiologist in New Hampshire.

== Honors ==
In 2024 Alroy-Preis was honored as one of the torchbearers in the national Israeli Independence Day ceremony.

== Selected publications ==
- Alroy, S; Preis, M; Barzilai, M; Cassel, A; Lavie, L; Halon, DA; Amir, O; Lewis, BS; Flugelman, MY (2007). "Endothelial cell dysfunction in women with cardiac syndrome X and MTHFR C677T mutation". Isr. Med. Assoc. J. 9: 321–5. PMID 17491230.
- Mevorach, D; Anis, E; Cedar, N; Hasin, T; Bromberg, M; Goldberg, L; Parnasa, E; Dichtiar, R; Hershkovitz, Y; Ash, N; Green, MS; Keinan-Boker, L; Alroy-Preis, S (2022). "Myocarditis after BNT162b2 Vaccination in Israeli Adolescents". N Engl J Med. 386 (10): 998–999. doi:10.1056/NEJMc2116999. PMC 8823652. PMID 35081295.
- Goldberg, Yair; Mandel, Micha; Bar-On, Yinon M.; Bodenheimer, Omri; Freedman, Laurence; Haas, Eric J.; Milo, Ron; Alroy-Preis, Sharon; Ash, Nachman; Huppert, Amit (2021). "Waning Immunity after the BNT162b2 Vaccine in Israel". New England Journal of Medicine. 385. doi:10.1056/nejmoa2114228. PMC 8609604.
