= Israel Cancer Research Fund =

The Israel Cancer Research Fund (ICRF) is a cancer research fund founded in 1975 by a group of American and Canadian physicians, scientists, and laypeople. The ICRF was founded to prevent the permanent loss of Israel's cancer researchers to foreign universities due to the lack of funding in Israel for newly minted Ph. D.s, post-doctoral fellows and accomplished young scientists (a phenomenon known to many as Israel's "brain drain"). With chapters in New York, Los Angeles, Chicago, Toronto, Montreal, and Jerusalem, ICRF annually sponsors a grant review process conducted by an expert panel of U.S. and Canadian scientists and oncologists and modeled on the NIH grant-making process.

Awards are granted directly to Israeli cancer researchers at all the leading academic and biomedical research centers throughout Israel. To date, the ICRF has funded more than $87 million in awards to Israeli cancer researchers via more than 2,700 fellowships, project grants, career development awards, and professorships. Grants have been provided to over 20 institutions including all major hospitals, universities, and cancer research projects throughout Israel. Breakthrough discoveries by ICRF-funded scientists have led to the development of Gleevec -used in the successful treatment of chronic myelogenous leukemia; Doxil - used in the treatment of breast & ovarian cancer as well as AIDS; p53 – a key tumor suppressor; RAD 51 which identifies the likelihood of breast cancer occurring in women who carry the BRCA 2 gene and Velcade. The basic research ICRF funds have led to treatments and drugs that are benefiting cancer patients around the world.

== Awards ==
- ICRF directly funds individual scientists, rather than "bricks and mortar." Money goes directly to research.
- ICRF is "institution-neutral." Its funding goes to scientists at all of Israel's top biomedical research centers.
- ICRF awards are made without deduction of institutional overhead. 100% of awarded funds go to scientists in Israel.
- ICRF awards are made solely on the basis of scientific merit and the ability of the individual scientist to make a significant impact in his/her field.
- ICRF awards are often the first grants that young Israeli scientists receive following the completion of their academic training and have a lifelong impact on the ability of young Israeli scientists to begin their professional careers in Israel.

== See also ==
- Marcelle Machluf
