= Kira Radinsky =

Israeli computer scientist and entrepreneur

- קירה רדינסקי
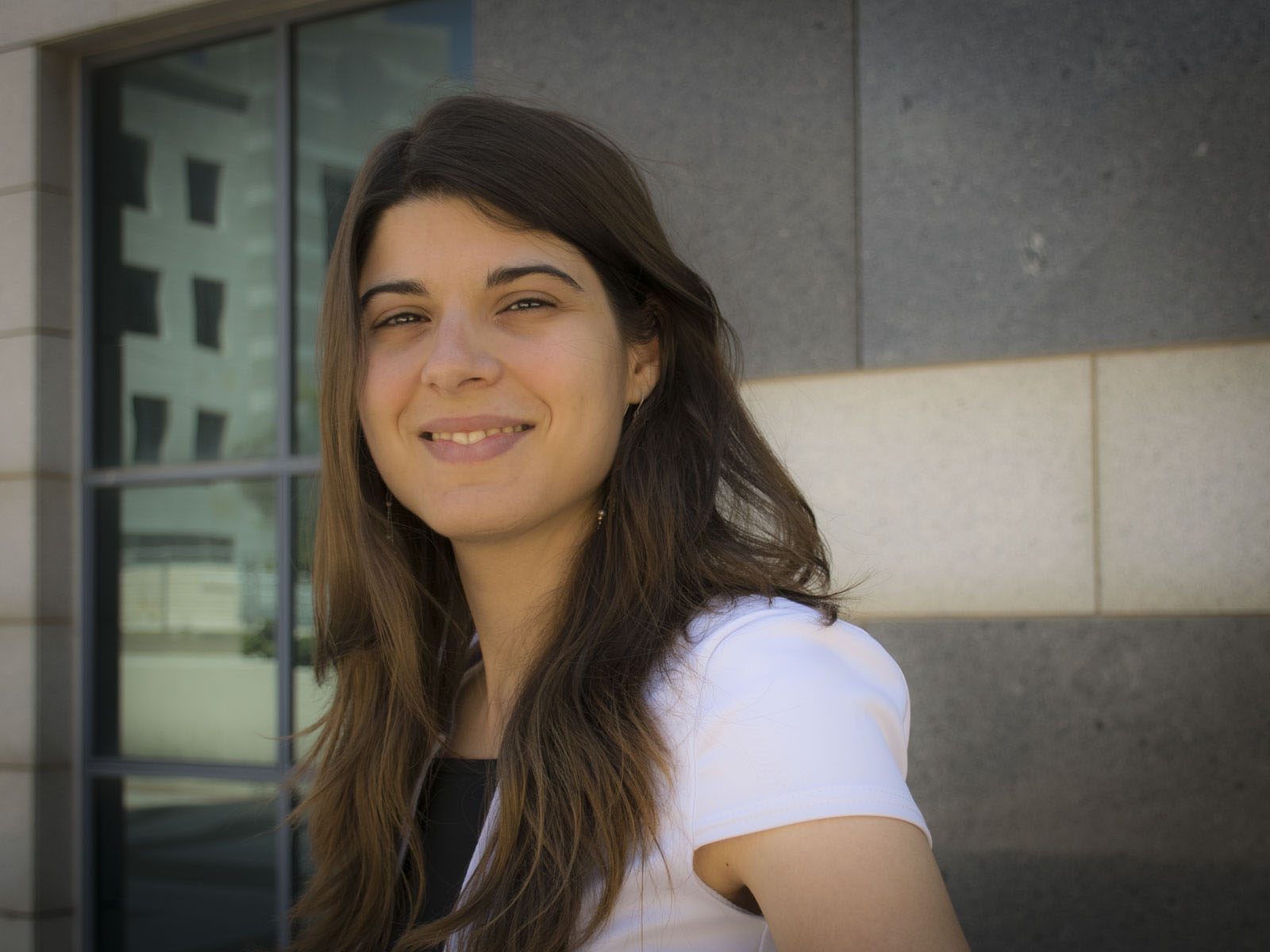
- Born: July 28, 1986 (age 40); Kyiv, Ukrainian SSR, Soviet Union
- Education: Technion – Israel Institute of Technology (BSc, MSc, PhD)
- Occupations: Computer scientist, entrepreneur
- Known for: Predictive data mining; co-founding SalesPredict and Diagnostic Robotics
- Title: Co-founder and Chief Technology Officer of Diagnostic Robotics
- Awards: MIT Technology Review 35 Innovators Under 35 (2013); Forbes 30 Under 30 (2015); Lady Globes Woman of the Year (2016)

Kira Radinsky (Hebrew: קירה רדינסקי; born July 28, 1986) is a Ukrainian-born Israeli computer scientist and entrepreneur whose work focuses on artificial intelligence, machine learning, natural language processing, and predictive data mining.

Radinsky is a co-founder and chief technology officer of Diagnostic Robotics and an associate research professor at the Technion – Israel Institute of Technology.

She previously co-founded predictive analytics company SalesPredict, which was acquired by eBay in 2016. Following the acquisition, she served as the Chief Scientist of eBay.

Radinsky is also a scientific co-founder of biotechnology company Mana.bio, works with Alma Labs on artificial-intelligence education, and is an independent non-executive director of Nebius Group.

== Early life and education ==
Radinsky was born in Kyiv, then part of the Ukrainian Soviet Socialist Republic in the Soviet Union. She immigrated to Israel with her mother at the age of four and grew up in Nesher.

Radinsky began studying computer science at the Technion at the age of 15. She completed three degrees at the Technion's Faculty of Computer Science: a BSc as part of the Rothschild Scholars Program for Excellence, followed by an MSc and PhD under the supervision of Shaul Markovitch.

Her doctoral research focused on methods for predicting future events using large-scale web data, historical information, and temporal dynamics.

Between 2004 and 2007, Radinsky served in Israeli military intelligence as a programmer.

In 2006, she received the Israel Defense Prize as part of her unit's technology team, and received the prize again in 2018.

== Research ==
Radinsky's early research focused on predictive data mining, machine learning, natural language processing, information retrieval, and knowledge discovery.

During her doctoral studies and research at Microsoft Research, Radinsky worked with Eric Horvitz on computational methods for identifying patterns in historical data and using them to estimate the likelihood of future events.

Their research analyzed historical news and other web sources to identify sequences of events associated with later outcomes, including disease outbreaks, deaths, and political unrest.

The work received broader attention after Radinsky's system was reported to have anticipated a cholera outbreak in Cuba by identifying historical relationships between drought, subsequent flooding, and cholera outbreaks.

Radinsky's academic research has since evolved from predicting future events from large-scale historical data to developing AI systems that model the dynamics of complex scientific and biological processes. Her current work focuses on combining machine learning with physical, structural, and biological knowledge so that models can capture how systems behave and change rather than relying only on statistical patterns.

This work spans scientific machine learning, computational biology, drug discovery, and biomedical AI. Recent research includes neural operators for learning the behavior of physical systems governed by partial differential equations, protein language models that incorporate changes in protein conformation, and multimodal biological models that combine molecular, gene-expression, and pathway information to predict tissue-specific drug activity.

A parallel line of research examines the reliability of large language models, including how models respond to conflicting evidence, social bias, and differing narratives. In 2026, Radinsky co-authored work examining systematic differences in how language models frame geopolitical events and the extent to which such differences can persist even when standard factuality measures indicate neutral responses.

Radinsky is an associate research professor at the Technion's Taub Faculty of Computer Science, where she supervises research in machine learning, biomedical AI, natural language processing, and computational biology.

== Career ==
=== SalesPredict and eBay ===
In 2012, Radinsky co-founded SalesPredict with Yaron Zakai-Or and served as its chief technology officer. The company developed predictive analytics technology for estimating customer buying behavior and sales conversion.

eBay acquired SalesPredict in 2016. Following the acquisition, Radinsky became Director of Data Science and Chief Scientist of eBay from Israel. She remained at eBay until 2019.

=== Diagnostic Robotics ===
In 2017, Radinsky co-founded Diagnostic Robotics with Yonatan Amir and Moshe Shoham.

Diagnostic Robotics develops artificial-intelligence technology for healthcare organizations, including systems for clinical prediction, patient engagement, population health, and healthcare workflow automation.

Radinsky has held several executive positions at the company, including chief executive officer and chief technology officer. She currently serves as co-founder and chief technology officer.

=== Mana.bio ===
In 2022, Radinsky became a scientific co-founder of Mana.bio, a biotechnology company applying artificial intelligence and machine learning to the design of lipid nanoparticle drug-delivery systems.

Mana.bio develops a platform combining machine learning, nanotechnology, and experimental testing to identify lipid nanoparticle formulations for the delivery of RNA, DNA, and other nucleic-acid-based therapeutics.

=== Alma Labs ===
Radinsky works with Alma Labs on the scientific direction of artificial-intelligence education. Alma is an education technology company focused on preparing students and schools for a world in which artificial intelligence is increasingly integrated into learning and work.

Alma develops an adaptive learning platform for middle schools designed to build AI fluency through personalized learning, project-based activities, educator support, and practical use of artificial intelligence.

Radinsky's work with Alma focuses on AI literacy and on how education should evolve as artificial intelligence becomes capable of reasoning, creating, communicating, and making decisions alongside humans.

== Board roles ==
Radinsky has served on boards spanning technology, healthcare, banking, and financial regulation.

Since August 2024, she has served as an independent non-executive director of Nebius Group, an AI infrastructure company listed on Nasdaq. She was reappointed in 2026 for a term running through the company's 2027 annual general meeting.

From 2022 to 2024, Radinsky served on the board of Esh Digital Bank, an Israeli digital banking company.

Radinsky served on the board of the Israel Securities Authority from 2017 to 2020.

She served on the board of the Maccabi Health Care Data Science Institute, associated with Maccabi Healthcare Services, from 2016 to 2022.

From 2015 to 2020, Radinsky served on HSBC's Technology Board in London, advising on technology and digital innovation.

== Awards, honors and recognition ==
- 2025 – Named one of the Top 25 Healthcare AI Executives by The Healthcare Technology Report.
- 2022 – Received the Special Contribution to the State of Israel Award in science from Israel's Minister of Immigration and Absorption.
- 2021 – Received the Light of Israel Award from Israel's Ministry of Foreign Affairs.
- 2021 – Selected as a World Economic Forum Young Global Leader.
- 2018 – Received the Israel Defense Prize as part of a technological intelligence project.
- 2017 – Included by Globes among 70 of Israel's brightest young women.
- 2017 – Named Israel Plus Person of the Year by Channel 9.
- 2016 – Selected as Lady Globes Woman of the Year.
- 2016 – Named an Honorary Fellow of Afeka Academic College of Engineering.
- 2015 – Included in Forbes' 30 Under 30 list in Enterprise Technology.
- 2015 – Received the Technology Pioneer Award from The Times of Israel.
- 2014 – Selected as one of the torchbearers at Israel's 66th Independence Day torch-lighting ceremony, representing science and technology.
- 2014 – Selected for the GOOD 100 for work in predictive data mining.
- 2013 – Selected for MIT Technology Review's 35 Innovators Under 35.
- 2013 – Her research on temporal information retrieval was selected by ACM Computing Reviews as one of its notable computing articles of the year.
- 2013 – Named among "10 Female Founders to Watch Out of Israel".
- 2013 – Included by Maariv among 100 inspiring people in Israel.
- 2013 – Selected by Globes for its list of promising Israeli businesspeople under 40.
- 2013 – Included by Globes among influential women in Israel.
- 2012 – Finalist for the Facebook Fellowship for research in data mining, natural language processing, and machine learning.
- 2010–2012 – Received Google research travel grants associated with SIGIR, WSDM, and [WWW](http://WWW).
- 2011 – Received a Yahoo! Key Scientific Challenge Award for research in information retrieval, algorithms, and data mining.
- 2009 – Received a Google Anita Borg Scholarship.
- 2008 – Received the Technion Computer Science prize for best academic work.
- 2008 – Received a Technion teaching award for teaching assistance.
- 2007 – Received the Technion Innovation in Technology Prize.
- 2006 – Received the Israel Defense Prize as part of a team for technological contributions to Israeli national security.
