= Miriam Zohar =

Israeli actress (born 1931)

- מרים זוהר
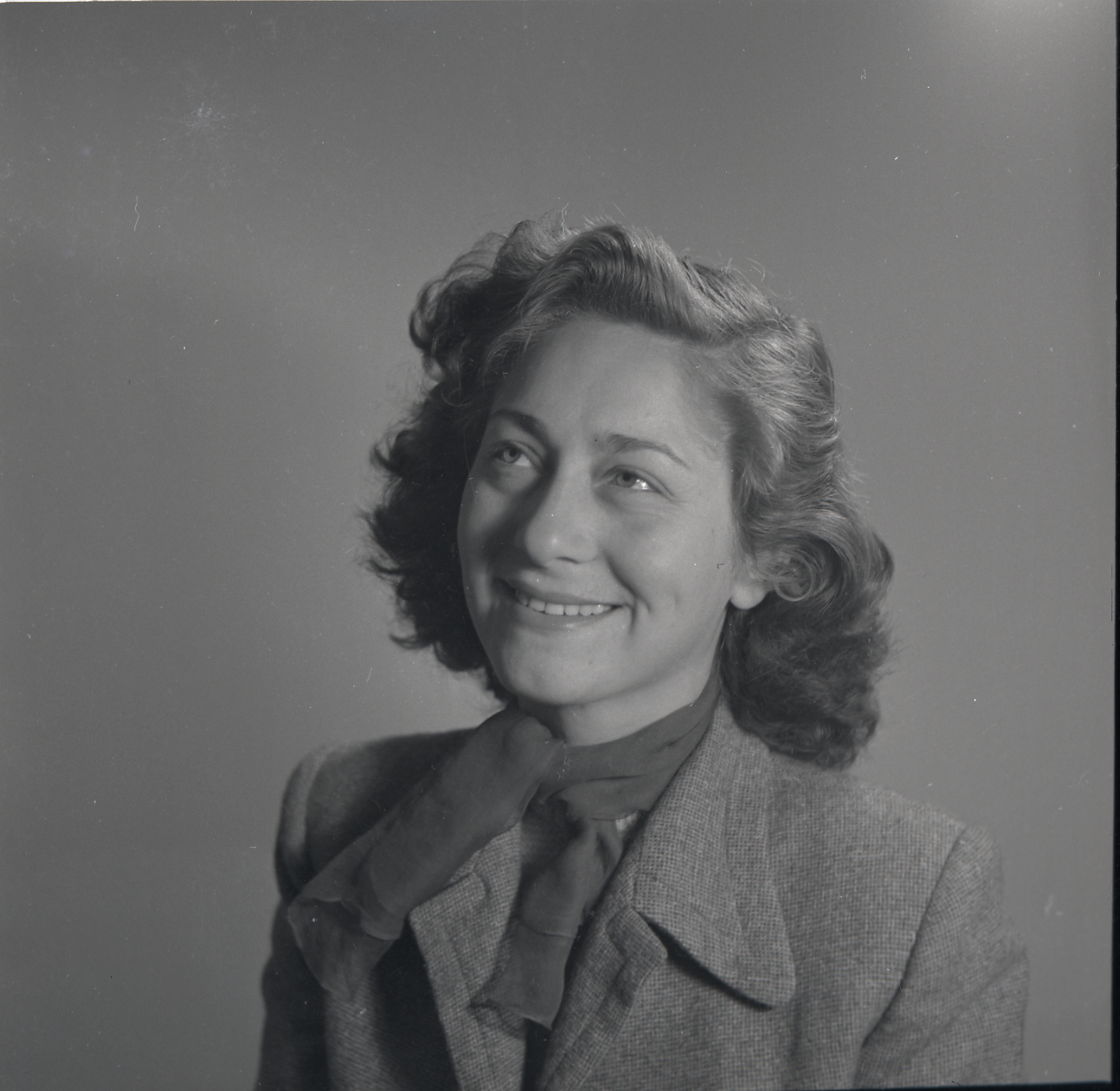
- Zohar in 1953
- Born: Marcela Katz; 16 October 1931 (age 94); Czernowitz, Kingdom of Romania
- Occupation: Actress
- Years active: 1949-present
- Spouse: Arie Gelblum (m. 1961; died 1992)
- Children: 2

Miriam Zohar (Hebrew: מרים זוהר; born 16 October 1931) is an Israeli actress. She is part of the Beit Lessin Theater in Tel Aviv.

== Biography ==
Zohar was born and lived in Czernowitz, then Romania, with her family until 1941. During that year, Germans invaded the city and Zohar, her brother and her parents were deported to Transnistria (now western Ukraine). In Transnistria, she and her family were forced into hard labor in Nazi work camps. In 1944, the Soviet military liberated them from Nazi forces and Zohar and her family moved back to Czernowitz. In 1946, her father was arrested and taken to the Soviet Union. Shortly after his imprisonment and death, the rest of her family moved to Timișoara in Transylvania. In 1948, the family attempted to illegally immigrate to Palestine on the Pan York. However, British ships captured the Pan York and the passengers were placed in detention camps in Cyprus. In 1949, she and her family finally made it to Israel.

In Israel, Zohar was invited to perform at a Yiddish theater where she was noticed by the Habimah. In 1951, she auditioned and was accepted into the Habimah where she played until 1994. Zohar (meaning "splendor" in Hebrew) was a stage name she adopted when she worked with Habimah. During her time at the Habimah, she played many leading female roles in world-famous plays under the director, Hy Kalus. She was especially noted for her versatile performance in her role as Martha in Who's Afraid of Virginia Woolf?.

After leaving the Habimah, she started acting at the Beit Lessin, where she has worked with dramatist and director, Shemuel Hasfari.

Zohar received an honorary doctorate from Bar-Ilan University for her acting work. She received the Aharon Ashman prize in 1980 for her role in The Stroll by Mária Földes. In 1987, she received the Israel Prize for her body of work in acting. In 2004, she was in the movie, The Schwartz Dynasty. In 2015, she was nominated for an Ophir Award as Best Actress for her performance in Fire Birds.

In 2014 Zohar was honored as one of the torchbearers in the national Israeli Independence Day ceremony.
