= Alice Miller (pilot) =

Israeli Air Force pilot

- אליס מילר
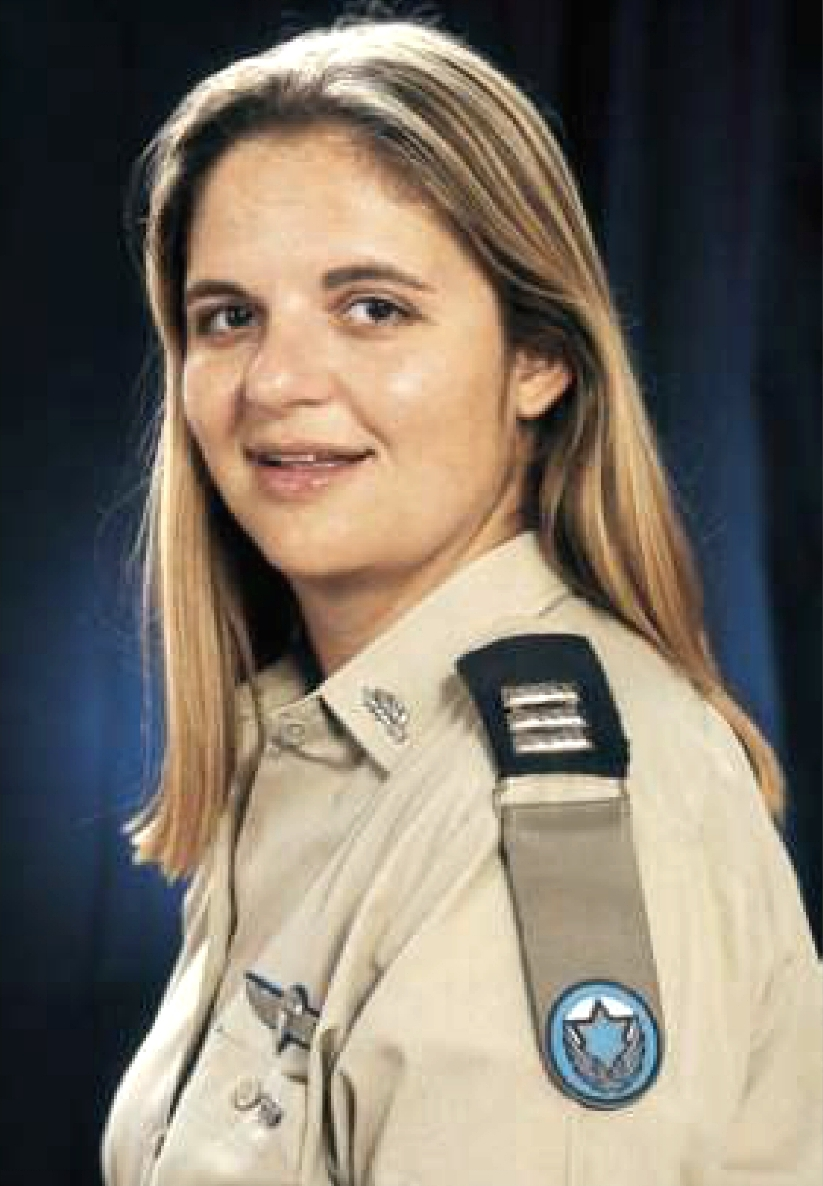

Personal details
- Born: 23 January 1972 (age 54) South Africa
- Citizenship: Israel
- Education: aerospace engineering
- Occupation: Pilot

Military service
- Allegiance: Israel

Alice Miller (Hebrew: אליס מילר) is an Israeli pilot who successfully sued the Israeli military for the right to enlist in the Israeli Air Force Flight Academy.

== Biography ==
Miller, a native of South Africa, migrated to Israel at the age of 6.

While attending high school in Tel Aviv, Miller began to complain about the Israeli Defense Force refusing women the ability to try out for combat roles despite the compulsory military service. By age 22, she was completing a degree in aerospace engineering from the Technion while on deferment from the army and had already received a civilian pilot's license from South Africa.

Miller applied to the Israeli Air Force Flight Academy in November of 1993 and proceeded to sue the government for discrimination when they rejected her. She sued the military for the right to take the qualification test, ultimately opening combat roles for women; among her arguments she cited female combatants in the 1948 Palestine war, some of which who would later serve as pilots.

The ban on female pilots was taken to the Israeli Supreme Court in 1995 and deemed unconstitutional in 1996. After gaining the right to try out for the pilot's program, Miller, then an officer in the military, passed the entrance exam but was declared medically unfit for the program later that same year.

Miller was followed by the first female graduate, Sari Rahat, in 1998 and the program's first female fighter pilot, Roni Zuckerman, in 2001.

In 2015 Miller was honored as one of the torchbearers in the national Israeli Independence Day ceremony.
