= Yeshayahu Gavish =

Israeli general (1925–2024)

- ישעיהו גביש
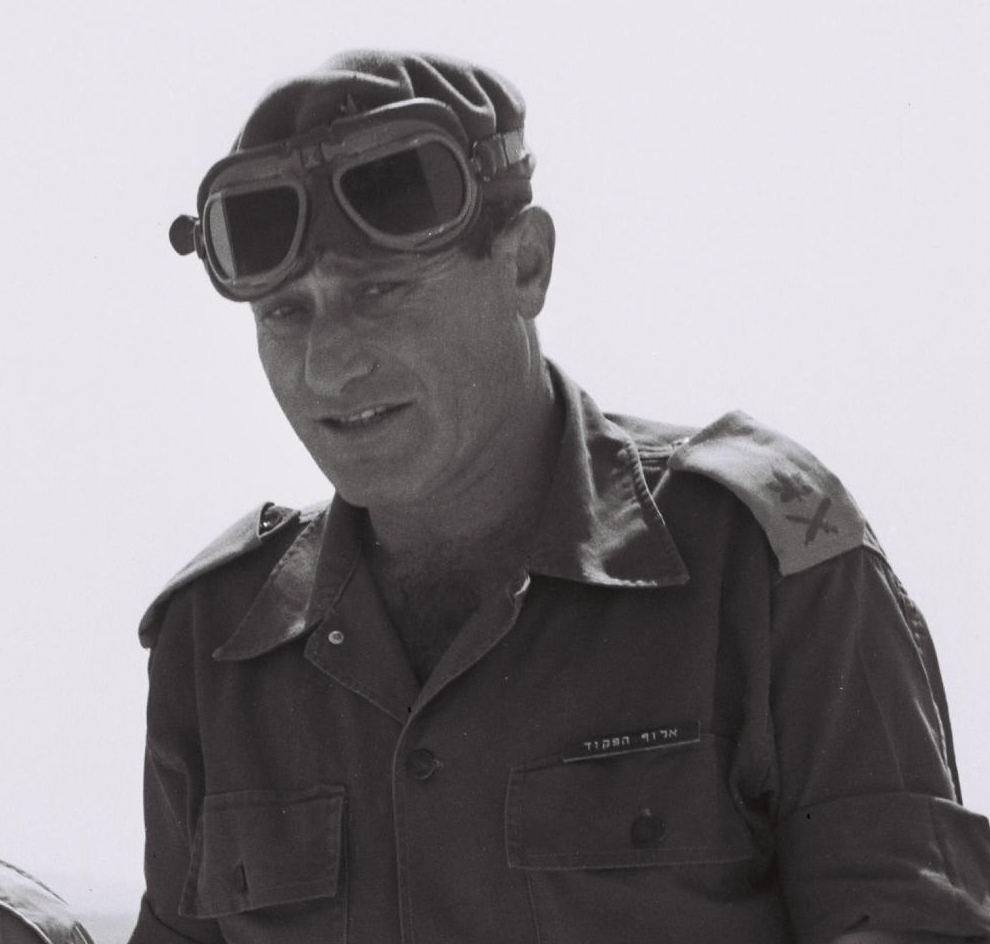
- Gavish in 1967
- Born: 25 August 1925; Tel Aviv, Mandatory Palestine
- Died: 3 October 2024 (aged 99); Ramat Hasharon, Israel
- Military career
- Allegiance: Israel
- Branch: Israel Defense Forces
- Service years: 1943–1973
- Rank: Major General (Aluf)
- Nickname: Shaike
- Conflicts: First Arab-Israeli War; Suez Crisis; Six-Day War; Yom Kippur War

Signature
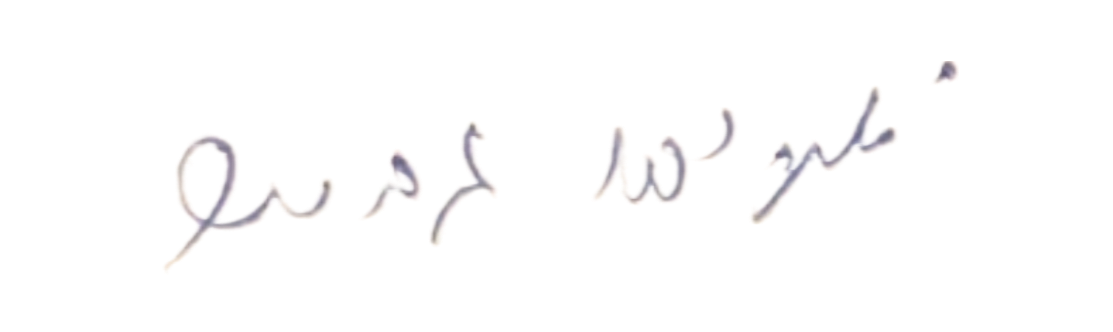

Yeshayahu Gavish (Hebrew: ישעיהו גביש; 25 August 1925 – 3 October 2024) was an Israel Defense Forces Major General known for leading the IDF forces in the Sinai Peninsula front during the Six-Day War.

== Early life ==
Gavish was born and raised in Tel Aviv. He studied at the school for workers' children in northern Tel Aviv and at a school in kibbutz Givat HaShlosha.

== Military career ==
Gavish joined the Palmach at age 18. He took part in the Night of the Bridges in 1946. During the 1948 Arab–Israeli War, Gavish fought in the Palmach under Yigal Allon. Following the war, he stayed in the Israel Defense Forces and rose through the ranks.

Between 1965 and 1969, he was chief commander of the Southern Command. During his military career, he led the Israeli offensive on the Egyptian forces in Sinai during the Six-Day War. Although the ground campaign was very successful, his subordinate divisional commanders, generals Israel Tal, Avraham Yoffe and Ariel Sharon, received more praise than he.

== Honors ==
In 2018 Gavish was honored as one of the ceremonial torchbearers for Israel's 70th Independence Day.

== Death ==
Gavish died on 3 October 2024, at the age of 99. He was the last surviving Israeli senior commander from the 1967 war.
