= Avraham Zarbiv =

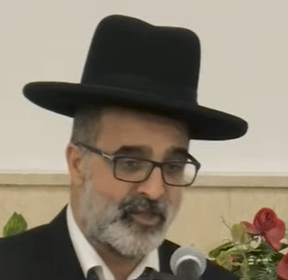
- Zarbiv in May 2025

Religious life
- Religion: Judaism

Avraham Zarbiv (Hebrew: אברהם זרביב; born January 23, 1972) is an Israeli rabbinical judge and Israel Defense Forces reservist. He became known as an IDF Caterpillar D9 operator during Gaza war.

== Early life ==
Zarbiv was born on January 23, 1972, to Rabbi Emanuel Zerbiv, the head of the rabbinical court in Tel Aviv, and Devorah, the sister of Rabbi Ben Zion Abba Shaul.

He grew up in Kiryat Moshe, a neighborhood in Jerusalem, and studied in "Morashah" (מורשה) Talmud Torah, and later at Yeshivas Itri. He served in the IDF in the Givati Brigade. After his service, he began studying at the Beit El yeshiva.

== Honors ==
In 2026 Zarbiv was honored as one of the 14 torchbearers in the national Israeli Independence Day ceremony.
