= David Rokni =

Israeli colonel (1932–2026)

- דוד רוקני
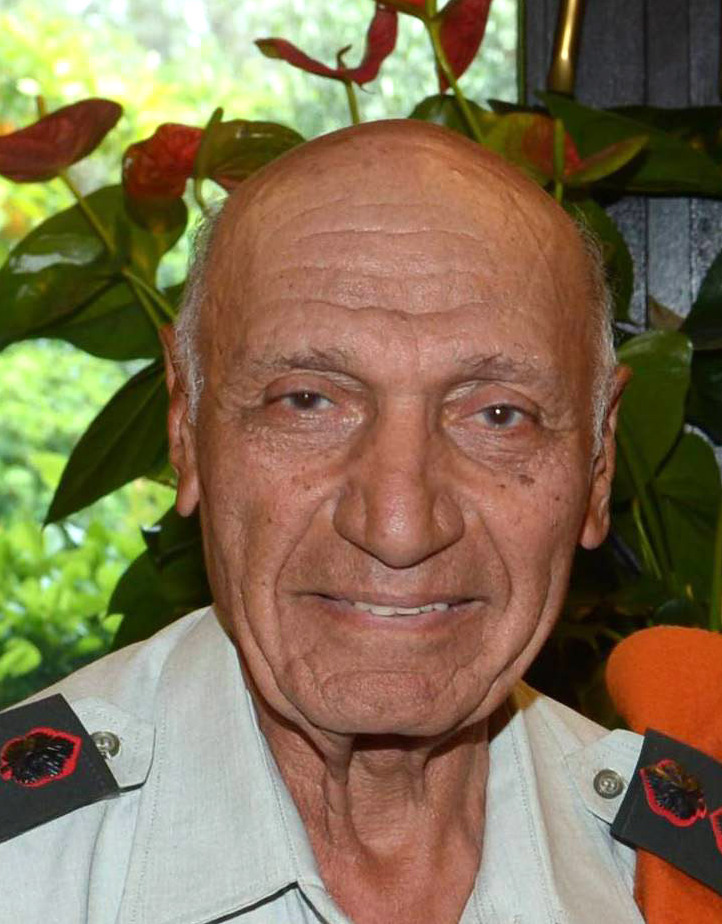
- Rokni in 2016
- Born: January 6, 1932; Kermanshah, Iran
- Died: March 8, 2026 (aged 94)
- Military career
- Service years: 1950–1983; 1983–2016
- Rank: Aluf Mishne
- Commands: Torch lighting ceremony commander

David Rokni (Hebrew: דוד רוקני; January 6, 1932 – March 8, 2026) was an Israeli reserve colonel. He became an Israeli icon as the commander of the annual Israel Independence Day torch lighting ceremony on Mount Herzl in Jerusalem for nearly four decades.

== Biography ==
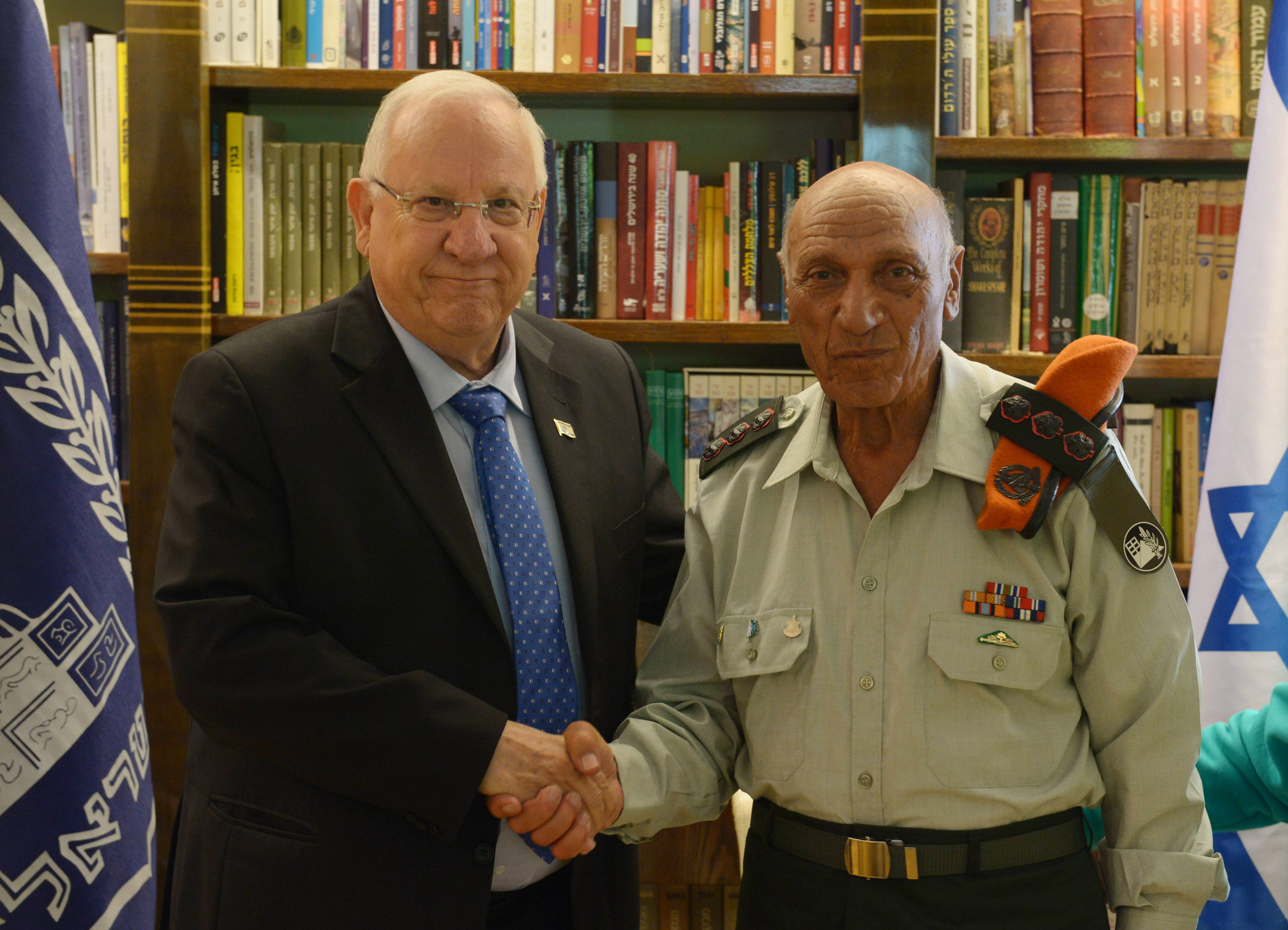
David Rokni meets with President of Israel Reuven Rivlin upon the end of his command of the annual Independence Day torch lighting ceremony in May 2016

David Rokni was born in Iran. He was a Colonel in the Israel Defense Forces. For 37 years in a row, Rokni organized and led the annual Independence Day ceremony on Mount Herzl.

In 2013, a documentary film, The Ceremony, about the torch-lighting ceremony and the role of David Rokni, won the Audience Award at the DocAviv Festival.

In May 2016, Rokni announced that he was retiring, and the ceremony that year would be the last one under his command. After the announcement, Rokni was hosted by president Reuven Rivlin at the President's Residence.

Rokni died on March 8, 2026, at the age of 94.

== See also ==
- Culture of Israel
