= Shira Isakov =

Israeli human rights activist

- שירה איסקוב
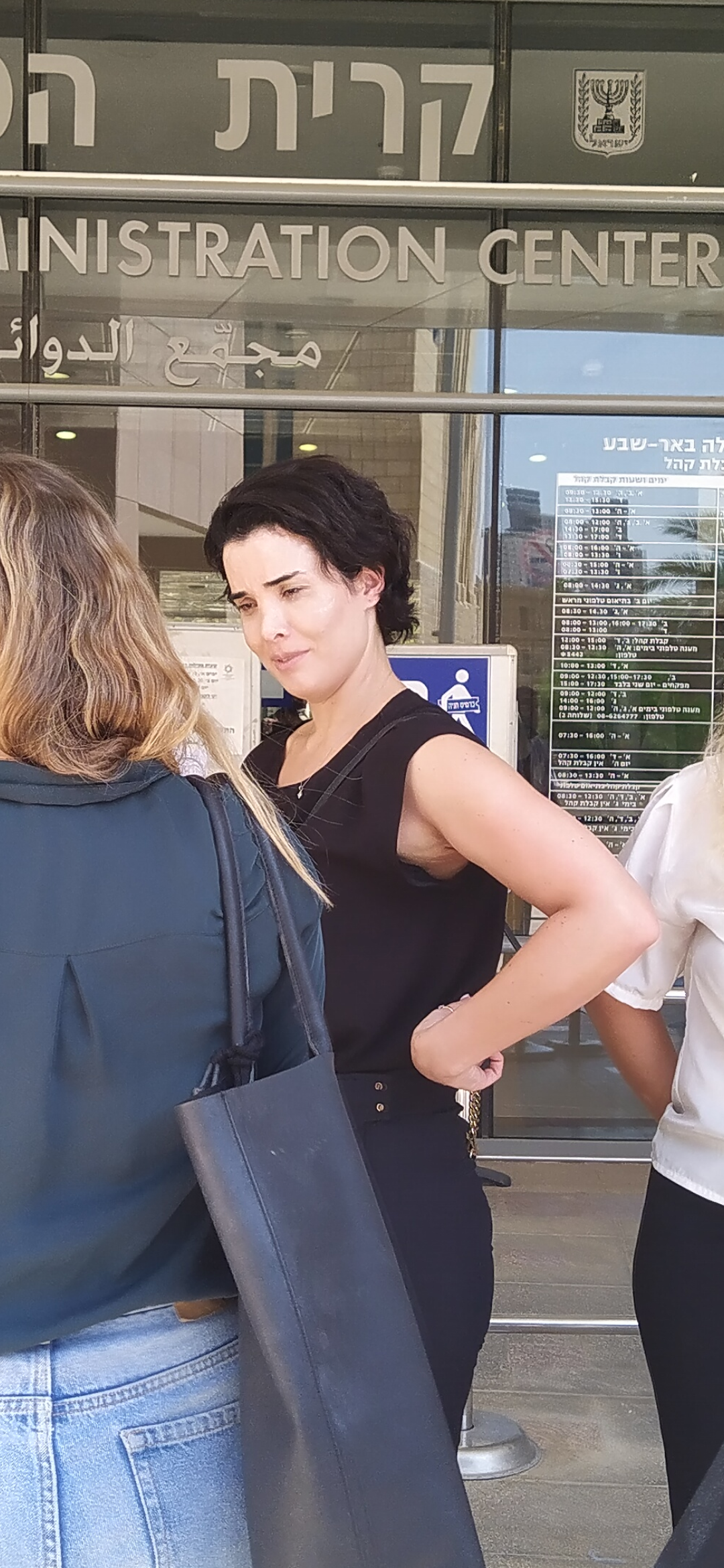
- Isakov outside the Beersheba courthouse, 2021
- Citizenship: Israel
- Occupation: Domestic abuse activist

Shira Isakov (Hebrew: שירה איסקוב) is an Israeli domestic abuse activist. On 18 September 2020, Isakov's husband Ariad Moshe attempted to murder her with a knife and a rolling pin in front of their son. Isakov was seriously injured but survived, and asked for her name and image to be made public in media reports following the attack. She went on to become a domestic abuse activist, and her subsequent struggle to divorce her husband and gain guardianship of her son was widely reported on in the Israeli media. In 2021, Moshe was convicted of attempted murder and sentenced to 23 years imprisonment.

== Attempted murder ==
On 18 September 2020, during preparations for Rosh Hashanah, Isakov and Moshe had a verbal argument which escalated until Isakov made the decision to leave their home in Mitzpe Ramon with their son to spend the holiday with her parents in Karmiel. Moshe did not agree with Isakov taking their son with her, and began to beat her with a rolling pin before stabbing her with a knife. The family's neighbour, Adi Gozi, heard Isakov's screams as well as her son crying and tried to enter the flat. The police were called and arrested Moshe, who had locked himself in the bathroom. Isakov was transported to Soroka Medical Center, where she was hospitalised for over a month. She asked for photos of her bandaged in her hospital bed to be published in the media.

== Trial ==
On 5 October 2020, the State Attorney filed an indictment charging Moshe with attempted murder and aggravated assault. The indictment, filed with Beersheba District Court, alleged that Moshe had hit Isakov multiple times with a rolling pin she had been using to make challah, strangled her, and stabbed her with a knife multiple times across her body. Moshe was accused of forcing their son to watch the attack.

In June 2021, while Moshe was in pre-trial detention, it was reported that he had attempted to make plans for Isakov to be attacked, after he was overheard by prison staff speaking to his parents. The investigation was subsequently dropped after the guard retracted their statement.

On 25 August 2021, Moshe was found guilty of attempted murder and child abuse. On 27 January 2022, he was sentenced to 23 years in prison, the maximum possible sentence, and was ordered to pay Isakov 258, 000 NIS in compensation.

== Response ==
During the trial, the Beersheba District Court initially granted Moshe's request that he not be publicly named as the suspect in the attack on Isakov, citing fears of harming his and his family's reputation. This was criticised on social media in Israel, including the use of the hashtag "#FaceIt!"; billboards appeared across Israel featuring a photo of Moshe as well as his name.

In January 2021, an interview with Moshe was broadcast by Kan News which had been recorded in prison. The decision to interview Moshe led to criticisms of the prison and the Israeli Public Broadcasting Corporation was criticised on social media, as well as by the Committee on the Status of Women and Gender Equality and the women's organisation Na'amat. The interview was subsequently removed from Kan News' website, and Moshe was placed in solitary confinement as punishment by the Israel Prison Service.

Later that same month, an interview was broadcast by Keshet with Isakov, in which she was seen to still have bruising and missing teeth from the assault.

== Subsequent events ==
Isakov faced further difficulty following Moshe's arrest when he refused to give consent for their son to be vaccinated, which was required by Israeli guardianship laws. This led to the government amending the Legal Capacity and Guardianship Law, which revoked guardianship from parents who had been convicted or charged with rape, murder or attempted murder.

Isakov has gone on to become a prominent activist in Israel against domestic abuse and gender-based violence. She spoke at the Knesset about her decision to reveal her identity to the public following the attack, and has taken part in various media interviews. In 2021, the newspaper Globes named her as one of the 50 most influential women in Israel.

On 9 February 2021, Isakov received a rabbinical divorce after a rabbinical court judge threatened Moshe to imprisonment if he continued to refuse.

Isakov and her neighbour Adi Gozi were chosen to light the torch at the Torch-lighting Ceremony marking the end of Yom HaZikaron and the beginning of Independence Day in 2021, following a public petition and campaign.
