= Jerusalem Brigades =

Jerusalem Brigades or Jerusalem Brigade may refer to:

- al-Quds Brigades (Saraya Al Quds), the militant wing of Palestinian Islamic Jihad
- Etzioni Brigade, a former unit of the Israeli Ground Forces
- 16th Infantry Brigade (Israel), the 16th Infantry Brigade of the Israeli Ground Forces.
- Liwa al-Quds, a group in the Syrian civil war
