= Medal of the Knesset =

Israeli state decoration

- Native name: Hebrew: עיטור הכנסת
- Type: State decoration
- Awarded for: "Significant contributions to the State of Israel and the Jewish people"
- Country: Israel
- Presented by: Speaker of the Knesset
- Eligibility: Israeli citizens and foreign nationals
- Motto: "Hast crowned him with glory and honor" (Psalms 8:6)
- Status: Currently awarded
- Established: 2026
- First award: 25 February 2026

Highlights
- Total: 1

Precedence
- Next (higher): Israeli Presidential Medal of Honour

The Medal of the Knesset (Hebrew: עיטור הכנסת, Itur HaKnesset) is an Israeli state decoration awarded by the Speaker of the Knesset, the legislative body of Israel.

== Description ==
The Medal of the Knesset is awarded to individuals for "significant contributions to the State of Israel and the Jewish people". It is awarded by the Speaker of the Knesset, the legislative body of Israel. The medal depicts the emblem of Israel, the Knesset building, and the Knesset Plenum. It is made of gold-plated bronze and is engraved with the phrase "Hast crowned him with glory and honor" from Psalms 8:6. The ribbon is silver and blue and features the Star of David.

== History ==
The Medal of the Knesset was first awarded on 25 February 2026 when Speaker Amir Ohana bestowed the decoration to Indian prime minister Narendra Modi. He issued the award for Modi having "significantly strengthened the ties between India and Israel and deepened the strategic cooperation between the countries" ("חיזק באופן משמעותי את הקשרים בין הודו לבין ישראל והעמיק את שיתוף הפעולה האסטרטגי בין המדינות").

== See also ==
- Orders, decorations, and medals of Israel
