= Shai Graucher =

Israeli philanthropist and activist

- שי גראוכר
- Born: Israel
- Occupations: Philanthropist, author, activist
- Organization: Klal Yisrael
- Known for: Humanitarian aid during the Israel–Hamas war
- Father: Dedi Graucher (father)

Shai Graucher (Hebrew: שי גראוכר) is an Israeli Orthodox philanthropist, activist, and author. He is best known for establishing and leading extensive humanitarian aid operations in Israel, particularly following the October 2023 Hamas-led attacks and during the subsequent Israel–Hamas war. Through his charitable initiatives, most notably the Klal Yisrael foundation, Graucher has raised tens of millions of dollars to support wounded soldiers, displaced families, and victims of terror. He is the son of the late Israeli Hasidic singer Dedi Graucher.

== Early life and background ==
Shai Graucher was born in Israel to Miriam and Gideon "Dedi" Graucher, a prominent Hasidic singer. He grew up in an Orthodox family. During his youth and early adulthood, Graucher formed a close personal relationship with Rabbi Chaim Kanievsky, one of the leading rabbinic authorities in Haredi Judaism. Graucher served as a close aide to the rabbi and later compiled and authored several books documenting Rabbi Kanievsky's life, teachings, and halakhic rulings.

== Philanthropy and humanitarian work ==
Following the outbreak of the Israel–Hamas war in October 2023, Graucher expanded his charitable operations significantly, founding the Klal Yisrael humanitarian initiative ( established in 2017 ) to support Israel Defense Forces (IDF) soldiers, wounded individuals, displaced families, and victims of terror.

Through fundraising campaigns in Israel and across Jewish communities in North America, Graucher raised tens of millions of dollars. The aid operations provided essential gear and hot meals to front-line troops, as well as financial assistance, housing needs, and support for displaced residents from northern and southern Israel. Additionally, Klal Yisrael organized public morale-boosting events, funded weddings for orphaned brides and grooms, and constructed recreational playrooms in hospitals for wounded soldiers and children.

In May 2024, during Israel's 76th Independence Day, Graucher was selected to light an official beacon at the national Independence Day ceremony on Mount Herzl in recognition of his civilian and philanthropic efforts during the war.

== Published works ==
Graucher has authored, compiled, and edited several books in English, primarily published by ArtScroll (Mesorah Publications). Most of his works focus on the teachings, commentaries, and life of Rabbi Chaim Kanievsky:

- Rav Chaim Kanievsky on Chumash (5 volumes) – A comprehensive collection of commentary and stories on the Torah.
- Rav Chaim Kanievsky on Siddur – Insights, commentary, and teachings on Jewish daily prayer.
- Rav Chaim Kanievsky on Tehillim – An anthology of commentary on the Book of Psalms.
- Iggeres HaGra / A Letter For The Ages – An anthology of insights and stories accompanying the Vilna Gaon's ethical letter.
- Ushpizin: The Seven Guests in the Succah – Commentary and perspectives on the Sukkot festival prayers.
