= Yossi Erblich =

Israeli doctor and philanthropist (born 1977)

- יוסי ערבליך
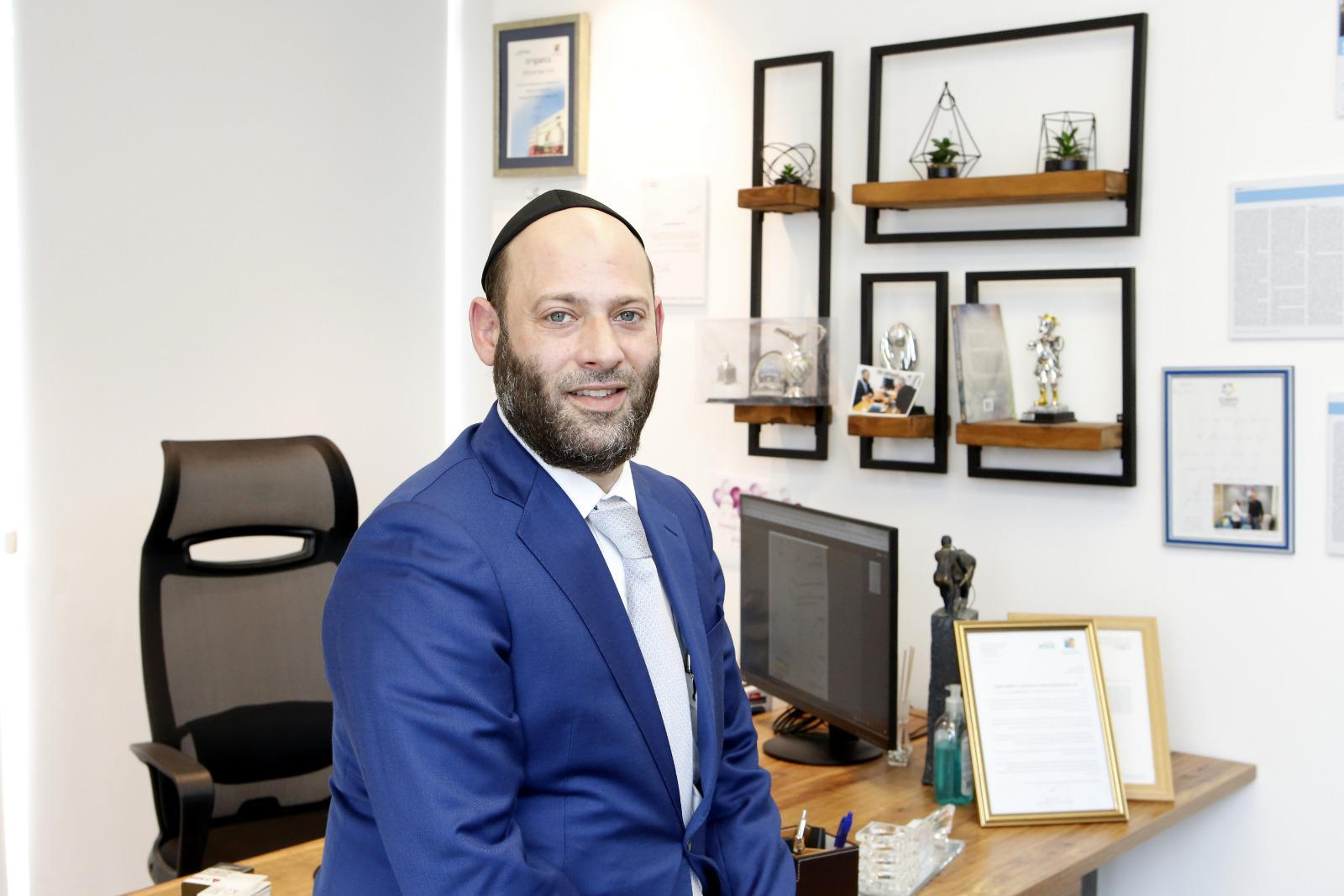
- Born: 1977 (age 48–49); Antwerp, Belgium
- Education: Beit HaTalmud Yeshiva; Ponevezh Yeshiva
- Known for: founder and chairman of the "LeMa'anchem" nonprofit organization
- Awards: Presidential Volunteer Medal (2022); Torch-lighting (2024)

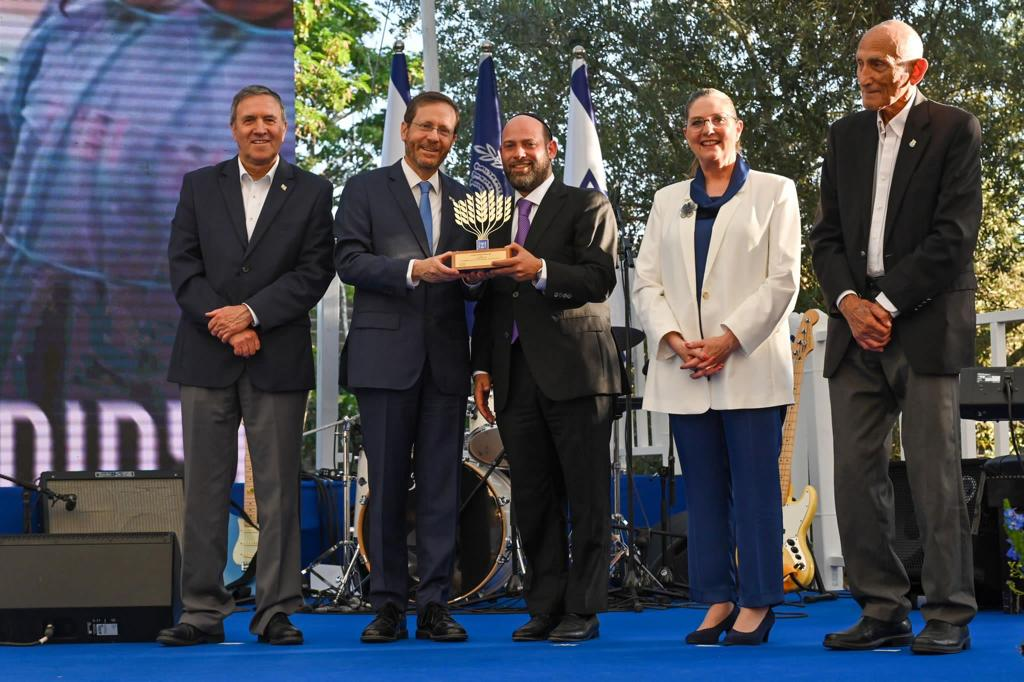
Getting the Presidential Volunteer Medal in 2022

Yossi Erblich (Hebrew: יוסי ערבליך; born 1977) is the founder and chairman of the "LeMa'anchem" nonprofit organization, which specializes in medical consulting.

== Early life ==
Erblich was born in Antwerp, Belgium, to businessman Shimon Erblich. In his youth, he immigrated to Israel and lived in Tel Aviv. He studied at Beit HaTalmud and Ponevezh Yeshivos.

In 1996, he began his activities in the medical field after encountering issues with the medical treatment provided to his uncle, Aharon Rosenfeld, the Rebbe of Pinsk-Karlin.

Erblich has connections in both general and ultra-Orthodox politics and is considered by the Lithuanian ultra-Orthodox community close to their late leader, Rabbi Steinman, and the leaders who succeeded him.

== Career ==
In 2017, Erblich founded the "LeMa'anchem" organization. Despite not having formal medical education, he offers medical knowledge gained from his experience and connections with doctors in Israel and abroad. Among the active doctors in the organization are Beni Davidson, head of the medical department of the organization and former director of the Emergency Division at the Ministry of Health, who serves as the head of the organization's medical team. Additionally, volunteers include Yosef Peres, the director of Schneider Children's Medical Center (serving as the organization's president).

In October 2019, following the controversy surrounding the fundraising event for the Ezra Lemarpeh nonprofit organization by consultant Elimelech Firer, Erblich published a letter supporting Firer's actions.

In 2021, during COVID-19, the organization launched an information campaign for the ultra-Orthodox community and encouraged the public to get vaccinated. Erblich received a certificate of appreciation from the Ministry of Health for these efforts.

In February 2021, together with Asher Zureyvin, Erblich established the LeMa’anChem Children's Rehabilitation Center in Bnei Brak.

In early 2023, Erblich met with Sheikh Muwafaq Tarif, the head of the Druze community in Israel. They discussed the involvement of Druze doctors and interns volunteering for LeMa’anchem and the organization's support for patients in Arab countries without diplomatic ties to Israel.

Since October 7, 2023, the organization has been operating in emergency mode.

In January 2025, the organization, together with Reichman University, launched the Baruch Scheinberg Fund — a scholarship fund for medical studies which intended for IDF soldiers and disabled veterans. The initiative aims to encourage these individuals to lead change in the Israeli healthcare system. Erbelich is a member of the committee alongside the Dean of the School of Medicine, Professor Arnon Afek, Director Dr. Miri Mizrahi, and others.

In March 2025, he published a letter to the Minister of Health warning about the dangers of using AI-based chatbots in the healthcare system. In the letter, he proposed formulating ethical guidelines for the proper use of artificial intelligence and establishing a regulatory oversight mechanism. Following the letter, Members of Knesset Yaakov Asher and Matan Kahana approached the Chair of the Health Committee, requesting a discussion on the matter.

== Awards and recognition ==
Erblich was mentioned by Gal Gadot and Mali Levi in 2019, when they thanked Erblich for his assistance in providing medical guidance and consultation.

In December 2021, at an event held in Russia, Erblich received a certificate of appreciation from Russian president Vladimir Putin and the "We Are Together" organization for his efforts during the COVID-19 pandemic.

In June 2022, he received the Presidential Volunteer Medal from President Isaac Herzog for his work with the "LeMa’anChem" organization. Following the award, a tribute evening was held in his honor. In August 2023, Erblich met with New York City Mayor Eric Adams, who expressed his appreciation for the fact that "LeMa’anChem" provides medical assistance and guidance to people regardless of religion, race, or gender.

In May 2024, Erblich was selected to light a torch on Israel's 76th Independence Day.

== Personal life ==
Erblich is married to Rachel. They have six children.
