= Marcelle Machluf =

Israeli biochemist (born 1963)

- מרסל מחלוף
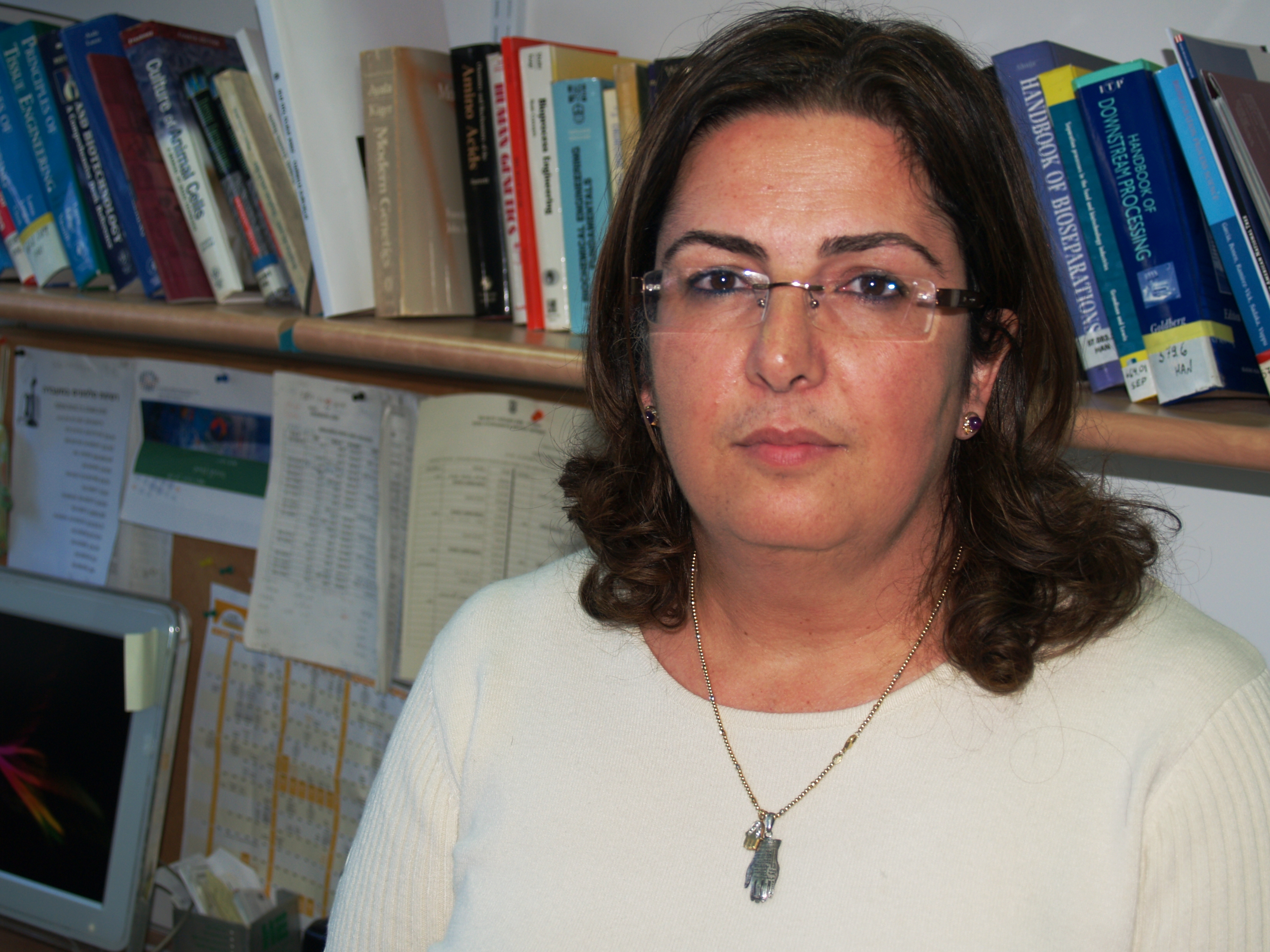
- Marcelle Machluf
- Born: May 24, 1963 (age 63); Morocco
- Citizenship: Israeli
- Known for: Tissue engineering, cancer drug delivery
- Awards: Juludan Research Prize; Gutwirth Award
- Scientific career
- Fields: Biotechnology

Marcelle Machluf (Hebrew: מרסל מחלוף; born May 24, 1963) is an Israeli biologist.

== Biography ==
Machluf was born in Morocco and moved to Israel with her mother and grandmother when she was one year old. She grew up in Ashdod. Her mother supported the family as a seamstress and a cleaning lady.

== Career ==
After completing high school and her army service, Machluf applied to the medical school, but unfortunately was not accepted. Instead, she decided to study Biology and received a B.Sc. in biology from the Hebrew University. She went on to receive her Master of Science and a Ph.D. in biotechnology engineering from Ben-Gurion University of the Negev. She conducted her postdoctoral research as a fellow at Harvard Medical School and focused on gene therapy, tissue engineering, and the control of drug delivery in cancer therapy.

Currently, Machluf is a full professor and the Dean of the Faculty of Biotechnology and Food Engineering at the Technion in Israel, as well as the director of the Laboratory for Cancer Drug Delivery & Cell-Based Technologies, where the Nanoghost, a modified stem cell to treat metastatic melanoma and mesothelioma, has been developed jointly with the New York University Langone Medical Center.

Her research interests include: Developing nanoparticles for the delivery of anticancer drugs to the brain and other organs; developing a nano-delivery system for DNA vaccination; and tissue engineering of the heart and its blood vessels using pig heart tissue, under the auspices of Technion's Russell Berrie Nanotechnology Institute (RBNI).

== Awards and recognitions ==
- 2004: Alon Award for excellence in science,
- 2006: Gutwirth Award for achievements in the gene therapy field,
- 2010: Hershel Rich Technion Innovation Award,
- 2014: Juludan Research Prize for outstanding innovative research,
- 2018: Selected as one of the 14 torchbearers for the Israeli 70th Independence Day ceremony, representing national recognition for her contribution to science and education

== Personal life ==
Machluf is married to Yigal and has three children.
