= Torch-lighting Ceremony (Israel) =

Israeli Independence Day ceremony

Torch-lighting Ceremony טקס הדלקת המשואות
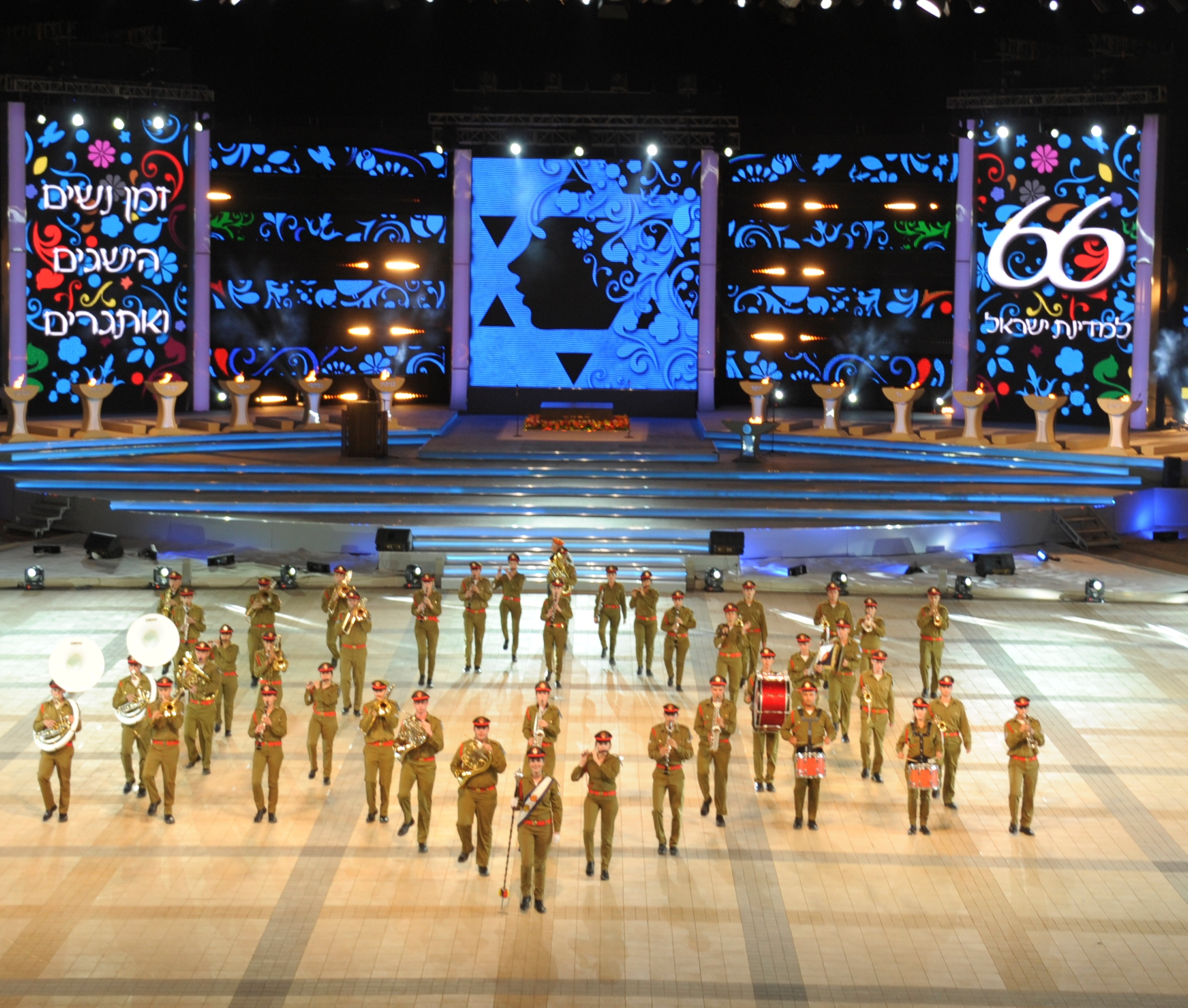
- 2014 ceremony
- Dates: eve of Israeli Independence Day; Hebrew: 4/5 Iyar
- Frequency: annual
- Locations: Mount Herzl, Jerusalem
- Country: Israel
- Inaugurated: 1950

The Torch-Lighting Ceremony (Hebrew: טקס הדלקת המשואות) is the official state ceremony that marks the closure of Yom Hazikaron (Remembrance Day) and the opening of the Independence Day in Israel. The ceremony is held annually at the burial site of Theodor Herzl on Mount Herzl in Jerusalem, and is officiated by the Speaker of the Knesset. The ceremony is attended by the government ministers, members of the Knesset, the Chief of General Staff, members of the diplomatic staff, IDF veterans and a number of citizens who are accommodated in three pavilions with around 5,000 seats temporarily set up around the compound.

The ceremony, which is broadcast live on the main television and radio channels, is designed to give the Day a dignified and festive atmosphere. The lighting of 12 torches that symbolize the Twelve Tribes of Israel by people who are seen to have made an outstanding contribution to society is the ceremony's highlight, alongside music performances, dances, parades and fireworks. The ceremony is directed by the Information Center of the Ministry of Culture and Sport. The commander of the ceremony between 1983 and 2016 was Colonel David Rokni, and since 2017 is Lieutenant Colonel Shimon Deri.

== History ==
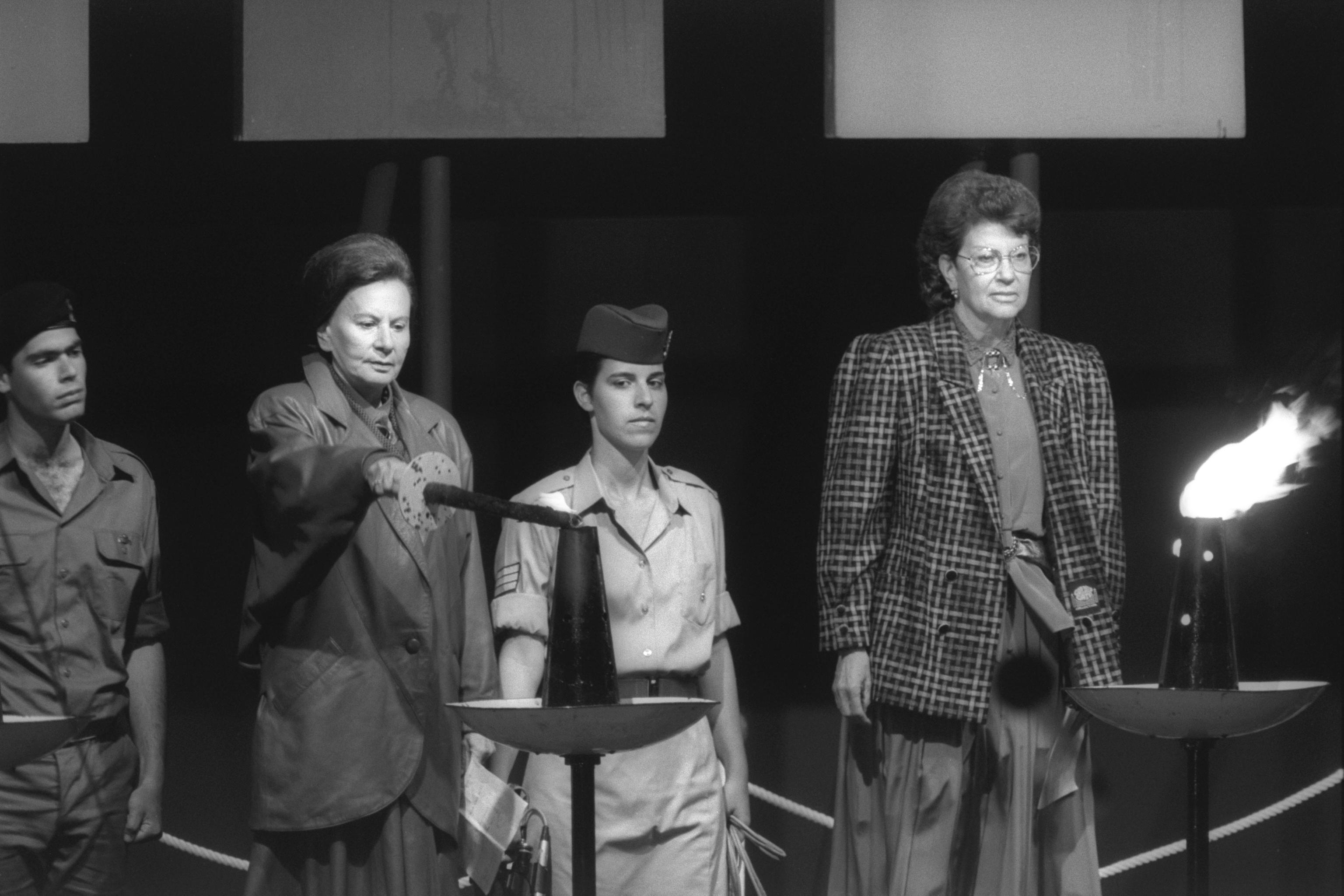
Supreme court justice Miriam Ben-Porat kindles one of 12 torches, 1988

The tradition of lighting torches was started in 1949 by the members of the Gadna premilitary program and Speaker of the Knesset when they visited Theodor Herzl's grave bearing torches. The torch-lighting ceremony became an official event in 1950, emphasizing the unity of the nation.

== Selection of torchbearers ==
Ceremony's highlight is the lighting of 12 torches that symbolize Twelve Tribes of Israel. Each year, the ceremony has a different central theme which corresponds to a phase in Israel's struggle for statehood and survival, as chosen by the Ministerial Committee on Ceremonies and Symbols. A few months before the Independence Day, a public notice for the selection of torchbearers is published in the media. A public advisory committee headed by the Director of the Information Center examines the proposals and chooses the torchbearers for that year. The committee consists of 8 to 10 members, including one representative of the chairman of the Ministerial Committee, Knesset and Israeli Prime Minister. Torch lighting is considered an honor. The conditions for selection are stipulated in the government's Rules for the Selection of Torchbearers at the Independence Day Ceremony. The criteria for differentiation of candidates are: balanced geographical distribution, distribution according to age groups to ensure inclusion of people of all generations, diversity in terms of the candidate's background and family's employment, candidate's sensibility towards national and personal pain (Holocaust, bereavement, terrorism) and inclusion of both men and woman, secular and religious people, national and religious minorities, native- and foreign-born Jews, members of different institutions and organizations and representatives of the IDF.

== Ceremony ==
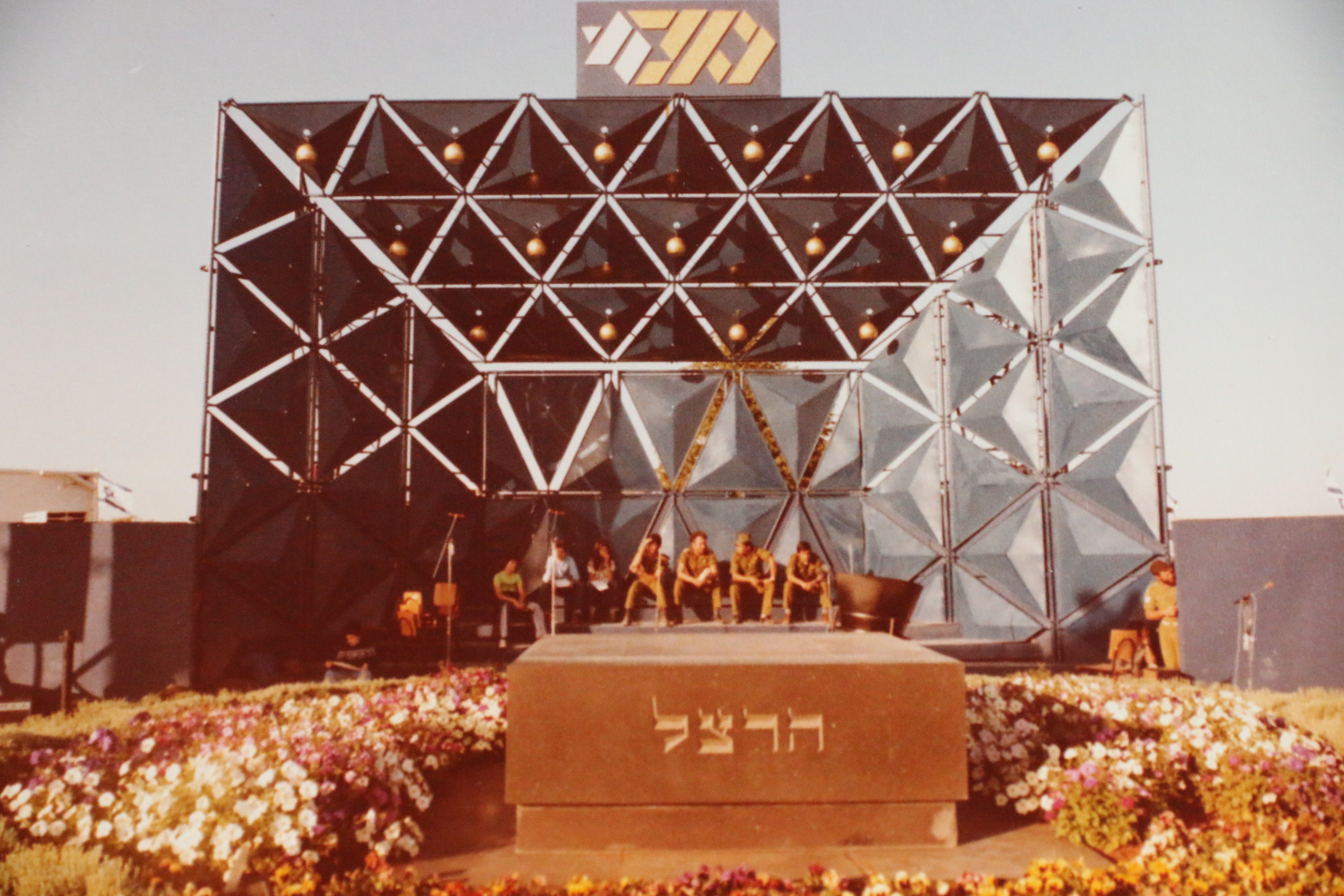
Stage set up for the 1978 celebration

Although the pattern is fixed, certain changes are made occasionally, so the description below may not be fully accurate. The ceremony can be divided into two parts: the ritual and celebrational.

=== Ritual segment ===
The ceremony was hosted for many years by Shmira Imber and Aryeh Orgad, and is since 2015 hosted by various presenters, including Naomi Rabi'a and Yigal Ravid. The ceremony opens at 19:45 (7:45 pm). At first, a squad of Knesset Guards enters the ceremonial square to welcome the entourage of the Speaker of the Knesset. The entourage is then greeted with the ceremonial fanfare sound played by three trumpeters from the IDF Orchestra and the raising of the Speaker's flag. The entourage then inspects the guard platoon and sits after which the commander of the ceremony arrives and asks the Speaker for the permission to continue the ceremony. Only when the permission is granted, the Guards are allowed to leave and take their place near the stage.

The ceremony begins with the mourning taps and the reading of the Jewish memorial prayer Yizkor. The prayer and selected passages from Tanakh were read for many years by radio announcer Amikam Gurevitch, and are since the 2010s read by different people connected to military and security operations conducted months prior to the ceremony. Then, at 20:00 (8:00 pm) exactly, the flag of Israel is raised from half mast to the top of the flagpole which symbolizes the transition from Memorial Day to Independence Day. After the conclusion of the reading of the selected passages from Tanakh, the Speaker is expected to deliver the speech which is usually the only speech at the ceremony, except for certain years, mostly anniversary years during which the Prime Ministers also delivered a speech. At the end of his speech, the Speaker is honored to kindle the central torch, marking the formal beginning of Independence Day.

After Speaker returns to his seat, 12 torchbearers are invited to kindle 12 torches representing the 12 tribes of Israel. Every torchbearer introduces himself, elaborates in honor of who or what he is kindling the torch, and ends his speech with the words "To the glory of the State of Israel!". The lighting is accompanied by the IDF orchestra and singing groups singing various Israeli songs including "We Carry Torches". After all twelve torches were kindled, the host says "Ladies and gentlemen, twelve torches representing the twelve tribes of Israel!", after which singers and dancers take the stage marking the commencement of the celebrational part of the ceremony.

=== Celebrational part ===
IDF flag

The celebrational part of the ceremony begins with the drilling exercises performed by the soldiers bearing the flags of various IDF, police and fire and rescue services units. The number of soldiers is the same as the number of the years of Israel celebrated that year. In the meantime, the IDF Orchestra plays several marches, patriotic songs and sometimes modern Jewish pop tunes. During the exercises, soldiers of the color guard create accurate structures symbolizing various things relevant to the central ceremony. Among others, they create a Star of David, letters or numbers that symbolize the years of Israel and the seven-branched menorah. At the end of the exercises, two additional segments, consisting of song/dance numbers, are presented, first celebrating the central theme and the second Independence Day.

Following these the Orchestra and colour guard now take their places, together with the Knesset Guard, for the finale, alongside a composite guard of honor contingent of service personnel of the IDF formed as a platoon (beginning 2016).

Each year, the flags of Israel and IDF are guarded by a different IDF unit. In a special segment of the ceremony, the flags are handed over from the unit that had been safekeeping them the previous year to the unit that would safe keep them until the next celebration, following these the incoming and outgoing color companies take their places in the field.

Afterward, everyone sings the national anthem of Israel, Hatikvah, as the parade renders the final honors to the dignitaries present. After the singing of the national anthem, the ceremonial commander orders the march off, and the whole ceremonial formation marches past the stands and off the field. The Commander of the ceremony then approaches the Speaker, salutes him and says "Madam/Sir Speaker, the ceremony has been concluded!". At the end of the ceremony, a famous singer sings a final song which is followed by a fireworks display and a performance by dancers.

== Political and protocol disputes and incidents ==
Chief rehabilitation nurse in the rehabilitation department of Hadassah Medical Center Naomi Nalbandian, a third-generation survivor of the 1915 Armenian genocide, was chosen as one of the torchbearers for the 2003 ceremony. Nalbandian wanted to mention the Armenian genocide during her ceremony speech, but was pressured not to mention it so she wouldn't harm Israel-Turkey relations. Nalbandian expressed her dissatisfaction, saying that "people change everything because of politics."

In 2004, it was decided that the ceremony would be marked by the Israeli achievements in sports. The committee selected eleven torchbearers and decided to let citizens vote by text messages for the twelfth. This method of election aroused criticism since many believed that it wasn't fitting for such an important state ceremony. Football player Eli Ohana won, but the criticism grew when the public found out that many of Israel's greatest athletes were not among other eleven torchbearers. As a result of the protests, basketball player Miki Berkowitz was added to the honorees.

In 2005, amid the struggle over the Israeli disengagement from Gaza, Speaker Reuven Rivlin, one of the opponents of the disengagement, made a political speech in which he praised the settlers which triggered the criticism on the left who accused him of taking advantage of the position he was given in ceremony as a state official.

In 2011, Yoel Shalit, brother of an Israeli soldier Gilad Shalit who had been held captive by Hamas for five years, and his girlfriend Ya’ara Winkler ran into the square and waved signs reading, "My father is a bereaved brother, I don’t want to be one too", and "Gilad is still alive." At the same ceremony, one of the torchbearers, Rabbi Shimon Rosenberg, whose daughter Rivka Holzberg was killed in a 2008 Mumbai attacks, changed the regular formula said when lighting the torches, saying "For the glory of the State of Eretz (the land of) Israel" because of the pressure put on him by Chabad leaders who objected to his participation, saying that if the rebbe Menachem Mendel Schneerson were alive he would have forbidden him from taking part, out of opposition to Zionism.

On 18 April 2012, during a ceremony rehearsal, Lieutenant Hila Bezaleli was killed and seven other soldiers from the flag squad were injured when a steel lighting rig above the square collapsed.

In 2018, the ceremony marking Israel's 70th anniversary sparked a major protocol dispute when Culture Minister Miri Regev pushed for Prime Minister Benjamin Netanyahu to speak, breaking a tradition reserving the platform solely for the Speaker of the Knesset. Knesset Speaker Yuli Edelstein threatened to boycott the event, while opposition figures criticized the move as political encroachment. A compromise allowed Netanyahu to give a brief address and kindle a torch alongside Edelstein, though he ultimately spoke for 14 minutes which was nearly double as much as what was customarily allotted to the Speaker.

== Ceremony themes and milestones ==
In 2014, the committee, at the time headed by Limor Livnat, chose a list of women to serve as torchbearers, as part of an effort to focus on the accomplishments of Israeli women.

During his 2026 state visit, President of Argentina Javier Milei became the first leader of a foreign nation to be selected to participate at the torch-lighting ceremony, where he joined in a performance of the Nino Bravo song "Libre" and told the audience before lighting a torch that "In life there are partners and there are friends. Partners come together for a moment of shared interest. Friends forge unbreakable bonds for life. I am pleased to say that Argentina and Israel are not merely partners, but friendly nations."

== See also ==
- Independence Day (Israel)
- List of Israelis
- List of Israeli Nobel laureates
- List of Israel Prize recipients
- List of people by nationality
- Politics of Israel, List of Knesset members
- Culture of Israel, Music of Israel
- Orders, decorations, and medals of Israel
