= Israeli Presidential Medal of Honour =

Civil award

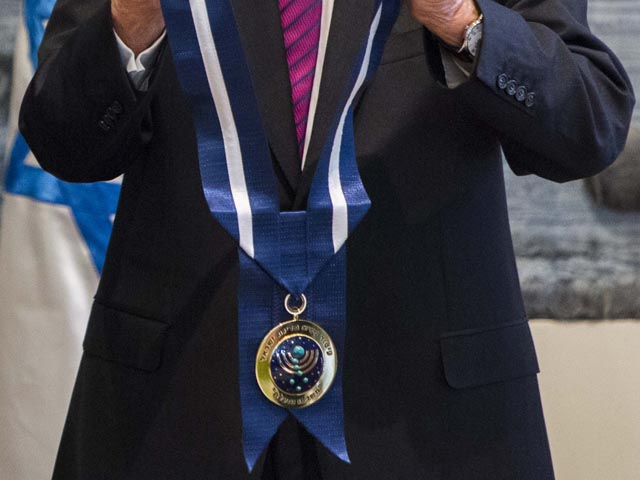
- President's Medal (2012 version)

Awarded by the President of Israel
- Eligibility: Israeli citizens and foreign nationals
- Awarded for: "outstanding contribution to the State of Israel or to humanity, through their talents, services, or in any other form."
- Status: Currently awarded
- Grades: One

Precedence
- Next (higher): none
- Next (lower): Medal of the Knesset
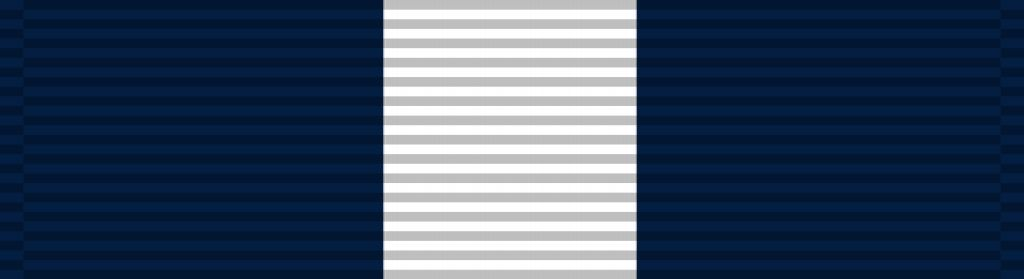
- Presidential Medal of Honour (2022–present) President's Medal (2012–2014)

The Israeli Presidential Medal of Honour (Hebrew: עיטור נשיא מדינת ישראל, Itur Nesi Medinat Yisra'el), formerly known as the President's Medal is the highest civil medal given by the President of the State of Israel.

== History ==
The President's Medal was first presented on March 1, 2012, in Beit HaNassi by President of Israel, Shimon Peres. In total, he awarded it to 26 people "who have made an outstanding contribution to the State of Israel or to humanity, through their talents, services, or in any other form." The medal, based on the French Légion d'Honneur, was designed by Yossi Matityahu and includes a verse from the Book of Samuel, which loosely translates as "head and shoulders [above the rest].

President Isaac Herzog revived the institution of the medal in 2022, awarding it for the first time since Shimon Peres in 2014. Under Herzog, the decoration was renamed the Israeli Presidential Medal of Honour. Recipients include Czech President Miloš Zeman and U.S. President Joe Biden.

== Recipients ==
=== President's Medal ===
==== 2012 ====
- Henry Kissinger, former Secretary of State of the United States
- Judith Feld Carr, Canadian human rights advocate who arranged the freedom of thousands of Syrian Jews
- Nadav Ben Yehuda, for risking his life to rescue fellow climber on Mount Everest.
- Rashi Foundation, advocates social mobility and equality
- Rabbi Adin Steinsaltz (Even-Israel), editor of The Talmud: The Steinsaltz Edition
- Zubin Mehta, music director emeritus of the Israel Philharmonic Orchestra
- Ory Slonim, Special Consultant to several of Israeli Ministers of Defense on POWs and MIAs

==== 2013 ====
- Barack Obama, President of the United States
- Bill Clinton, former U.S. President
- Elie Wiesel, human rights activist
- Steven Spielberg, movie director

==== 2014 ====
- Rabbi Yitzchak Dovid Grossman, Chief Rabbi of Migdal HaEmek, founder and dean of Migdal Ohr
- Lia Van Leer, founder of the Haifa Cinematheque, the Jerusalem Cinematheque, the Israel Film Archive and the Jerusalem Film Festival
- Avi Naor, Israeli businessman
- Rabbi Avraham Elimelech Firer, chairman and founder of Ezra LeMarpeh, a nonprofit organization that provides medical assistance to the needy
- Brig.-Gen. Avigdor Kahalani, soldier and former Minister of Internal Security
- Avner Shalev, chairman of the Yad Vashem directorate
- Dr. Harry Zvi Tabor, founder of the National Physical Laboratory of Israel, father of Solar power in Israel
- Jack Mahfar, Iranian Jewish philanthropist
- Angela Merkel, Chancellor of Germany
- Giorgio Napolitano, President of Italy
- Ruth Dayan, social activist and founder of the Maskit fashion house
- Stef Wertheimer, industrialist, philanthropist and former Knesset member
- Kamal Mansour, adviser on minority affairs to seven Israeli Presidents
- Rabbi Israel Meir Lau, former Ashkenazi Chief Rabbi of Israel
- Prof. Reuven Feuerstein, developmental psychologist and founder of the International Center for the Enhancement of Learning Potential

=== Israeli Presidential Medal of Honour ===
==== 2022 ====
- Miloš Zeman, President of the Czech Republic
- Joe Biden, President of the United States
- Nicos Anastasiades, President of Cyprus
- Dalia Fadila, Arab Israeli educator

==== 2023 ====
- Chava Alberstein, a leading folk musician
- Adi Altschuler, founder of Zikaron BaSalon
- Meir Buzaglo, a Jewish renewal activist
- Rabbi Menachem Hacohen, an interfaith leader and former Knesset member
- Mona Khoury, VP of strategy and diversity at the Hebrew University of Jerusalem
- Maj.-Gen. (res.) Dan Tolkowsky, a retired Israeli Air Force officer
- Carmela Menashe, the military correspondent for Army Radio
- Bibars Natcho, former captain of the Israeli national football team
- Assad Araidy, an educator
- Lena Shtern, social entrepreneur
- André Azoulay, a senior adviser to Moroccan King Mohammed VI
- Irwin Cotler, former Canadian Justice Minister
- The Kemach Foundation, which promotes employment in Israel’s haredi (or ultra-Orthodox) sector, organizational prize

==== 2024 ====
- Frank Lowy, Australian billionaire
- Mark Leibler, former President of the Zionist Federation of Australia

==== 2025 ====
- Edi Rama, Prime Minister of Albania
- Donald Trump, President of the United States
- Frank-Walter Steinmeier, President of Germany

==== 2026 ====
- Javier Milei, President of Argentina
