= Tolkowsky =

Tolkowsky or Tolkovsky (Hebrew: טולקובסקי) is a surname. Notable people with the surname include:

- Dan Tolkowsky (1921–2025), Israeli general
- Denise Tolkowsky (1918–1991), English pianist and composer
- Gabi Tolkowsky (1939–2023), Belgian-Israeli diamond cutter
- Marcel Tolkowsky (1899–1991), Belgian diamond cutter
- Shmuel Tolkowsky (1886–1965), Belgian-Israeli agronomist and diplomat
