= List of ambassadors of Israel to Tanzania =

The Ambassador from Israel to Tanzania was Israel's foremost diplomatic representative in Tanzania.

== List of former ambassadors ==
- Oded Joseph (Non-Resident, Nairobi) 2019–present
- Noah Gal Gendler (Non-Resident, Nairobi) 2017–2019
- Jacob Keidar (Non-Resident, Nairobi) 2007–2011
- Yitzhak Pundak November 1965 until ?

=== Former Ambassadors – Tanganiyika ===
- Rafael Ruppin 1962
