= Jack Mahfar =

Iranian businessman and philanthropist (born 1931)

- Born: 1931 (age 94–95); Jouybareh district, Isfahan, Imperial State of Iran
- Occupations: Businessman; Philanthropist; Entrepreneur
- Years active: 1950s–present
- Known for: Pharmaceutical ventures in Iran and philanthropy
- Awards: President’s Award of Distinction (Israel, 2014)
- Website: jmahfar.com

Jack Mahfar (born 1931) is a Swiss-Iranian businessman and philanthropist who works in pharmaceuticals.

== Early life and education ==
Mahfar was born into a Jewish family in the Jouybareh district of Isfahan, an area historically known as the centre of Jewish life in Iran. He began his education at the Ayin School, a Christian missionary institution, before he continued at the Alliance High School and then later enrolling in the School of Literature. However, his studies were disrupted in 1948 when his family relocated their house to Tehran.

== Career ==
In Tehran, Mahfar worked at Rey Pharmacy, under Dr. Moussa Bral. He began his career as an apprentice in the pharmaceutical industry. He founded Mahfar Co., a firm that served as a local representative for foreign pharmaceutical entities, including Sweden-based Astra. The company produced medications under licensing agreements from European manufacturers.

Mahfar later proposed establishing a domestic pharmaceutical manufacturing facility to produce essential medicines locally, with the goal of reducing reliance on imports and improving affordability. Although the initiative gained support from foreign partners, it was ultimately abandoned following the Iranian Revolution of 1979.

Throughout his career, Mahfar contributed financially to the construction of schools, retirement homes, and employee housing. These philanthropic efforts were acknowledged by the Iranian Jewish representatives in parliaments and other government officials.

After relocating to Switzerland, Mahfar remained active in philanthropy. He contributed to the construction of synagogues in Israel, supported medical centres, and funded educational projects, including the Encyclopædia Iranica.

Following the revolution, his business was nationalized, prompting his move to Geneva. There, he launched a new pharmaceutical enterprise and continued his humanitarian work, including assisting in the release of imprisoned Iranian Jews in Shiraz.

On January 30, 2014, he was presented with the President's Award of Distinction from the Israeli President Shimon Peres. In addition, he also received various letters of appreciation, insignias, and tablets of honor. He published an autobiography called From Laborer to Entrepreneur: Memoirs of Jack Mahfar, which narrates his life from the Jouybareh district of Esfahan to life in Tehran and later Geneva, Switzerland.

== Sources ==
- From Laborer to Entrepreneur, Memoirs of Jack Mahfar, First Edition, Fall 2013 http://jmahfar.com/english.html
- اعطای مدال افتخار ریاست جمهوری اسرائیل به ژاک ماهفر یهودی http://mfa.gov.il/MFAFA/IsraelExperience/IraniansInIsrael/Pages/20140130-Peres-Mahfar.aspx
- از کارگری تا کارآفرینی - خاطرات ژاک ماهفر - بازگشت به .. http://jmahfar.com/world-personality.html
- رونمایی از کتابی تازه درباره زندگی یهودیان ایران‌زمین - رادیو فردا http://www.radiofarda.com/content/f2_iran_losangeles_ehsan_yarshater_jewish_communities_hooman_sarshar/24374361.html
- نقد و معرفی : امیر حسین دیانی http://rahavard.com/Reviews/99-Review-Mahfar.pdf
- یک ایرانی، به زودی بزرگ ترین نشان افتخار فرانسه را می گیرد https://faryadiran.wordpress.com/
