= Shalom Cohen =

Shalom Cohen may refer to:

- Salomon Jacob Cohen, Hebrew scholar
- Shalom Obadiah Cohen (1762−1836), founder of the Jewish community in Kolkata
- Shalom Cohen (diplomat) (born 1955), Israeli ambassador to Egypt
- Shalom Cohen (politician) (1926−1993), Israeli politician; member of the Knesset
- Shalom Cohen (rabbi) (1931−2022), Israeli rabbi
