= Ali minaret =

Registered in the List of National Monuments of Iran

Ali Minaret
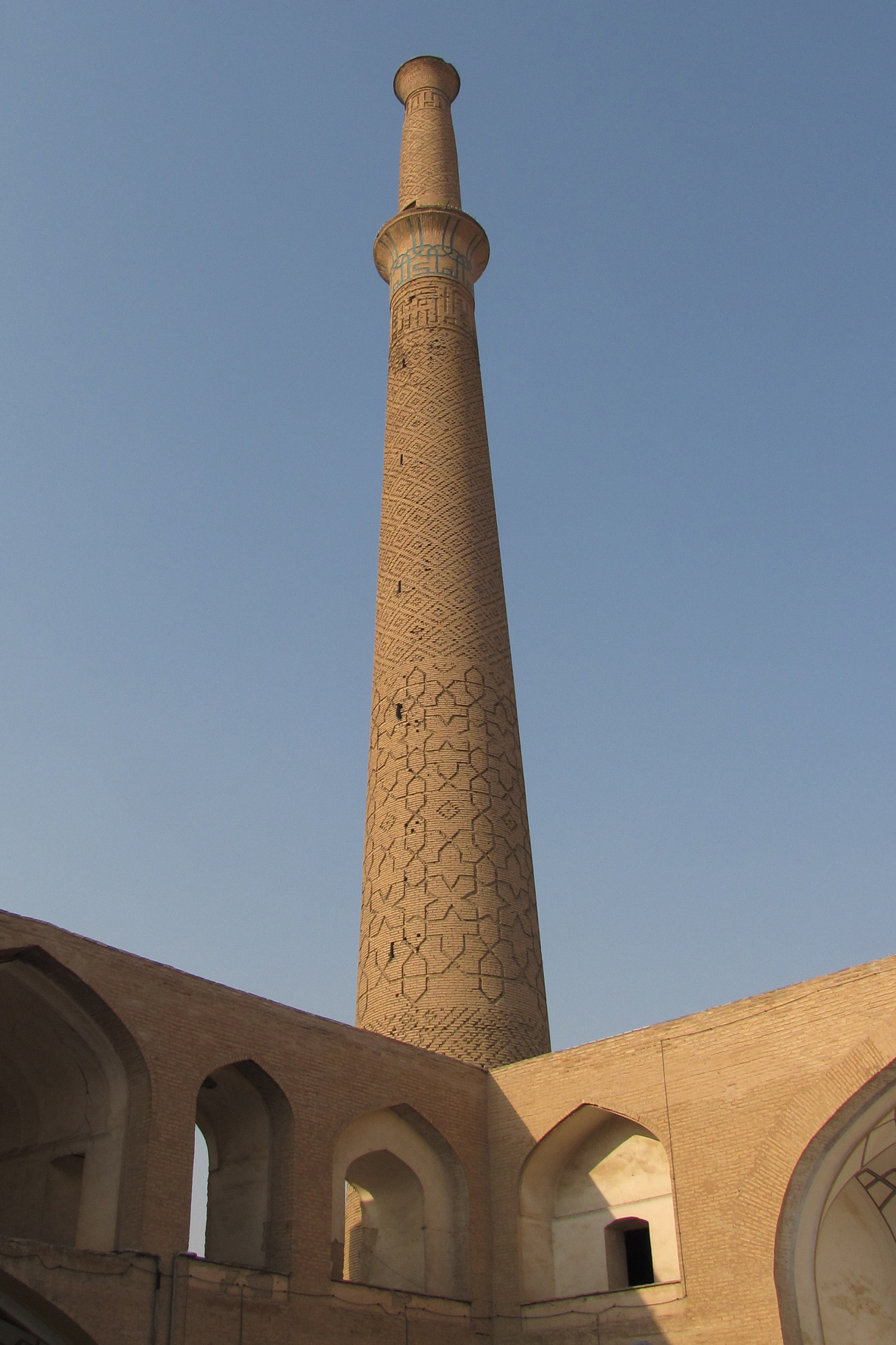
- مناره علی

- Location within Iran

Religion
- Affiliation: Islam
- Province: Isfahan

Location
- Location: Isfahan, Iran
- Municipality: Isfahan
- Coordinates: 32.665514°N 51.682972°E

Architecture
- Type: Minaret
- Style: Razi

Specifications
- Height (max): 52m
- Minaret height: 52m
- Iran National Heritage List
- Official name: Minaret and Mosque of Ali
- Type: Minaret/Mosque
- Designated: 1932
- Reference no.: 96
- Conservation organization: Cultural Heritage, Handicrafts and Tourism Organization of Iran

The Ali minaret (Persian: مناره علی), constructed in the 11th century, is the oldest minaret in Isfahan, Iran. It is close to the Ali mosque. This minaret is 52 metres (171 ft) in height and is the second highest historical minaret in Isfahan after the Sarban minaret. It is said that this minaret was originally 54 metres (177 ft), but its height has decreased 2 metres (6 ft 7 in) in the course of time. There are four inscriptions on the Ali minaret. One of the inscriptions is made of brick and the others are made of ceramic.

== See also ==
- List of the historical structures in the Isfahan province
