= Yoav Heller =

Israeli activist

- יואב הלר
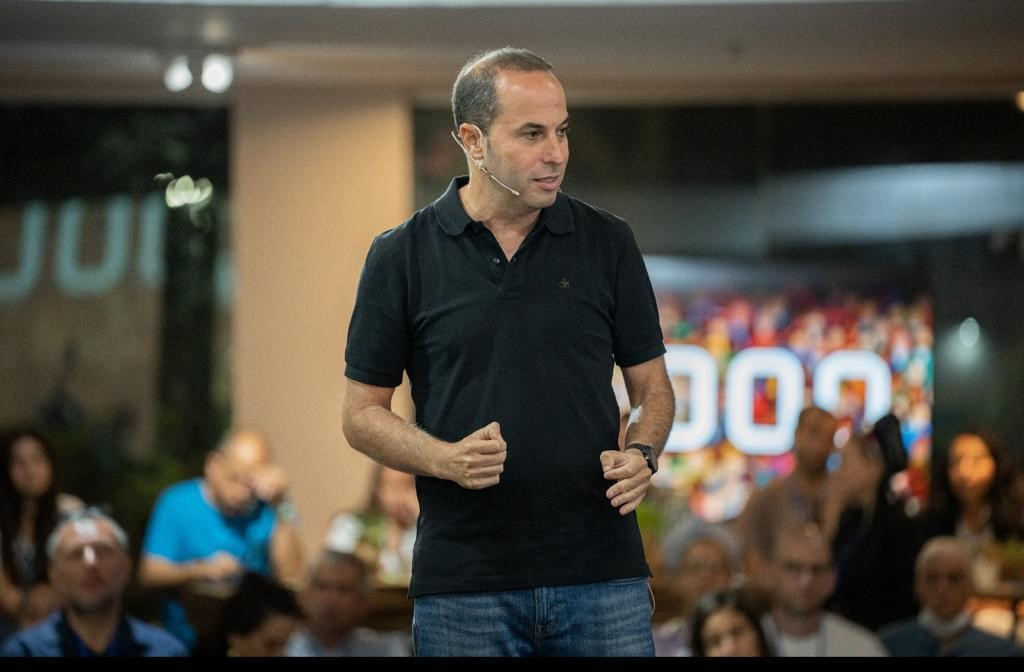
- Heller in 2023

Personal details
- Born: November 1, 1973 (age 52) Herzliya, Israel
- Spouse: Polly Bronstein
- Children: 2
- Occupation: Social activist
- Known for: Founder of The Fourth Quarter

Yoav Heller (Hebrew: יואב הלר) is an Israeli activist who is one of the founders of The Fourth Quarter and was also formerly a chairman at the Wingate Institute.

== Early life ==
Yoav Heller was born in 1973 in Herzliya. Because of his father's work in Solel Boneh, Heller moved several times as a child with his family, including in Nigeria and in Atlanta. After returning to Israel, the family settled in Menahemia before moving to Zikhron Ya'akov in 1990.

During his military service, Heller served in the 7298th Infantry Regiment in the 98th Paratroopers Division as a commander.

Heller holds a Bachelor of Arts in Political science and Middle Eastern history, a Masters of Arts in Educational administration and policy from Tel Aviv University, and a PhD in History from the University of London. He wrote his doctoral dissertation on the father of the Mengele twins, Zvi Spiegel, and the issue of memory design.

== Career ==
In 1999, Heller began working as an editor at the Ynet website. In 2001, he was appointed editor of the homepage and sports section.

In 2002, he joined the Branco Weiss Institute as a facilitator in schools in Lod, Ofakim, and the Hof HaCarmel Regional Council. In 2003, he helped establish the Tachlit program, which promoted education and social mobility among disadvantaged populations, reaching about 12,000 students living in the periphery.

In 2009, Heller moved to London, where he co-founded and managed the Israel Connect Europe (ICU) program, which assisted young Europeans from 17 countries with Israeli advocacy. In 2011-2015, he led the British delegation of the March of the Living.

In 2014, Heller was appointed as the CEO of Maoz, where he helped with several initiatives aimed at promoting leadership with the interior, health, and education ministries, and also help reduce racism in Israeli society through media representation.

During the COVID-19 pandemic in Israel, Heller helped with pandemic response on the national level, including establishing multi-sectoral table for the Haredi and Arab communities.

In 2019, Heller was appointed as the chairman of the National Corporation of the Wingate Institute, and later in September 2022 appointed as chairman overall.

=== Social activism ===
In 1998, Heller and three of his friends founded an organization aimed at helping college students who struggle with paying college tuition costs and also fight for lower tuition fees. Heller served as chairman of the organization, where the movement lasted for 6 months and shut down campuses in Israel for 40 days. The movement ended after negotiations with the government.

In 2021, Heller founded The Fourth Quarter alongside Ella Ringel, Uri Herman and Eitan Zeliger. Heller serves as the chairman of the movement, where he helps with conducting events such as salong meetings, seminars and lectures.

In 2025, Heller spoke about the importance of bridging between communities to reduce polarisation in Israel, and believed that top-down politics failed to address core societal concerns because of a focus on the limited desires of interest groups.

== Personal life ==
Heller is married to social activist Polly Bronstein. The couple has two children and live in Tel Aviv. Heller regularly lectures on his doctoral topic and participates in Zikaron BaSalon.
