= List of ambassadors of Israel to Malawi =

== List of ambassadors ==
- Oded Joseph (Non-Resident, Nairobi) 2019 -
- Noah Gal Gendler (Non-Resident, Nairobi) 2017 - 2019
- Jacob Keidar (Non-Resident, Nairobi) 2007 - 2011
- Itzhak Gerberg (Non-Resident, Jerusalem) 2002 - 2003
- Moshe Itan 1990 - 1993
- Zeev Dover 1985 - 1987
- Meir Gavish 1978 - 1981
- Shammay Zvi Laor 1974 - 1978
- Meir Joffe 1966
