= Ifat =

Ifat may refer to:

- Ifat (historical region), a former geographic region in Northeast Africa, in the northern part of the Horn of Africa
- Sultanate of Ifat, a Muslim sultanate in this geographic region

IFAT may refer to:

- Indirect fluorescent antibody technique, a diagnostic process employing secondary immunofluorescence
- International Federation of Alternative Traders, the original name of the World Fair Trade Organization (WFTO)

== See also ==
- Yifat, Israel, a kibbutz in the Northern District, Israel
- Yifat (given name), a Hebrew feminine given name sometimes transliterated as 'Ifat'
- Yifag, a town in Kemekem, Amhara, Ethiopia
