= List of ambassadors of Israel to Zambia =

== List of ambassadors ==
- Ofra Farhi 2022-
- Jacob Keidar (Non-Resident, Nairobi) 2007 - 2011
- Itzhak Gerberg (Non-Resident, Jerusalem) 2002 - 2003
- Gad Elron 1971 - 1973
- Matityahu Dagan 1968 - 1971
- Tehan Ben-Zion 1965 - 1968
