= Noah Gal Gendler =

Israeli diplomat

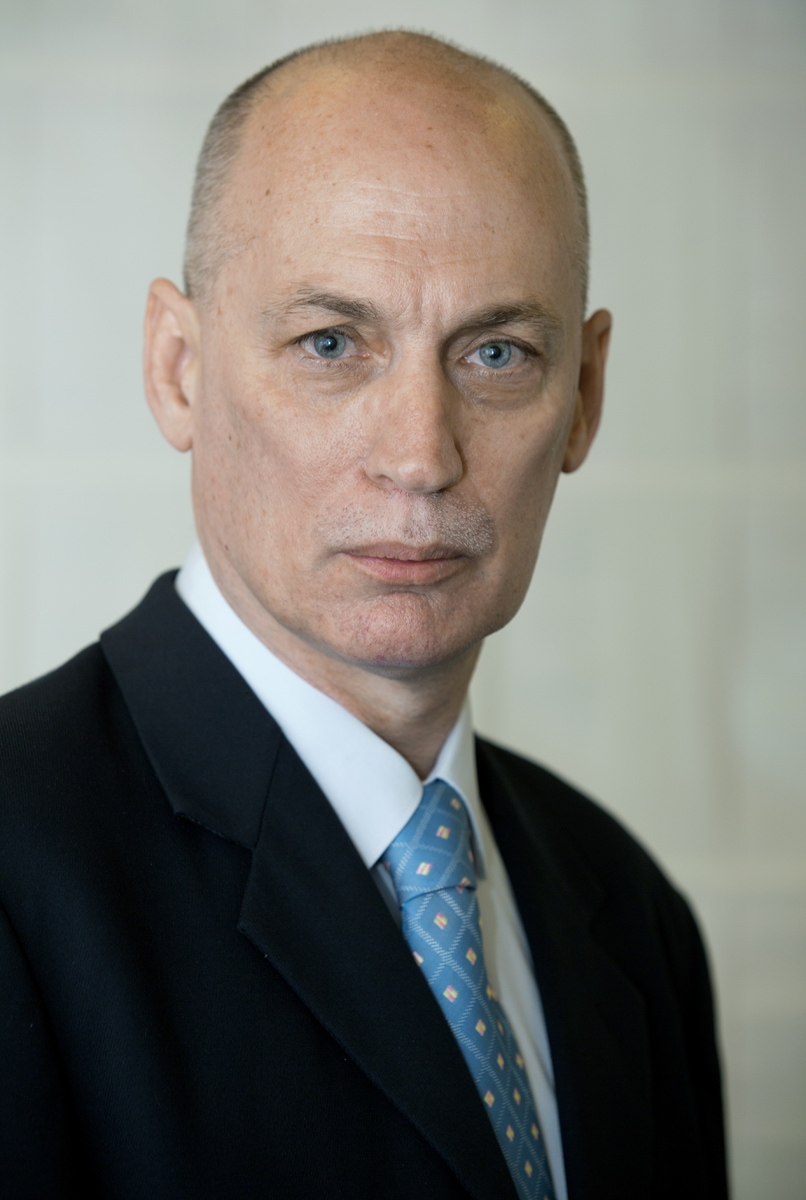

Israel Ambassador to Albania
- In office September 2019 – September 2022
- Preceded by: Boaz Rodkin
- Succeeded by: Galit Peleg

Israel Ambassador to Bosnia and Herzegovina
- Incumbent
- Assumed office September 2019
- Preceded by: Boaz Rodkin

Israel Ambassador to Kenya
- In office August 2017 – August 2019
- Preceded by: Yahel Vilan
- Succeeded by: Oded Joseph

Israel Ambassador to Uganda
- In office August 2017 – August 2019
- Succeeded by: Oded Joseph

Israel Ambassador to Tanzania
- In office August 2017 – August 2019
- Succeeded by: Oded Joseph

Israel Ambassador to Seychelles
- In office August 2017 – August 2019
- Succeeded by: Oded Joseph

Israel Ambassador to Malawi
- In office August 2017 – August 2019
- Succeeded by: Oded Joseph

Israel Ambassador to Bulgaria
- In office 2006–2011
- Preceded by: Avi Sharon
- Succeeded by: Shaul Raz Kamisa

Israel Ambassador to Uzbekistan
- In office 1997–2002
- Succeeded by: Zvi Cohen-Litant

Personal details
- Born: August 12, 1957 (age 69) Haifa, Israel
- Children: 5
- Education: B.A., University of Haifa; M.A., Hebrew University of Jerusalem
- Occupation: Diplomat

Noah Gal Gendler (born August 12, 1957) is an Israeli diplomat who has served as the nation's ambassador to a variety of countries.

== Biography ==
Born in Haifa, Israel, Gendler served in the Israel Defense Forces from 1975 to 1979, where he was a Captain in Artillery. Gendler holds a B.A. in Geography and Political Science, University of Haifa, 1985, and an M.A. in Political Science, Hebrew University of Jerusalem, 1986 He is married, with five children.

== Diplomatic career ==
- 2019-2022: Ambassador Extraordinary and Plenipotentiary of Israel to Albania, non-resident Israeli Ambassador to Bosnia and Herzegov
- 2017–2019: Ambassador to Kenya, Uganda, Tanzania, Seychelles and Malawi
- 2006–2011: Ambassador to Bulgaria
- 1997–2002: Ambassador to Uzbekistan
- 1991–1995: Deputy Chief of Mission in Bangkok, Thailand
- 1989–1991: Deputy Chief of Mission in Katmandu, Nepal
