= Krembo Wings =

Israeli movement for youths with special needs

- כנפיים של קרמבו
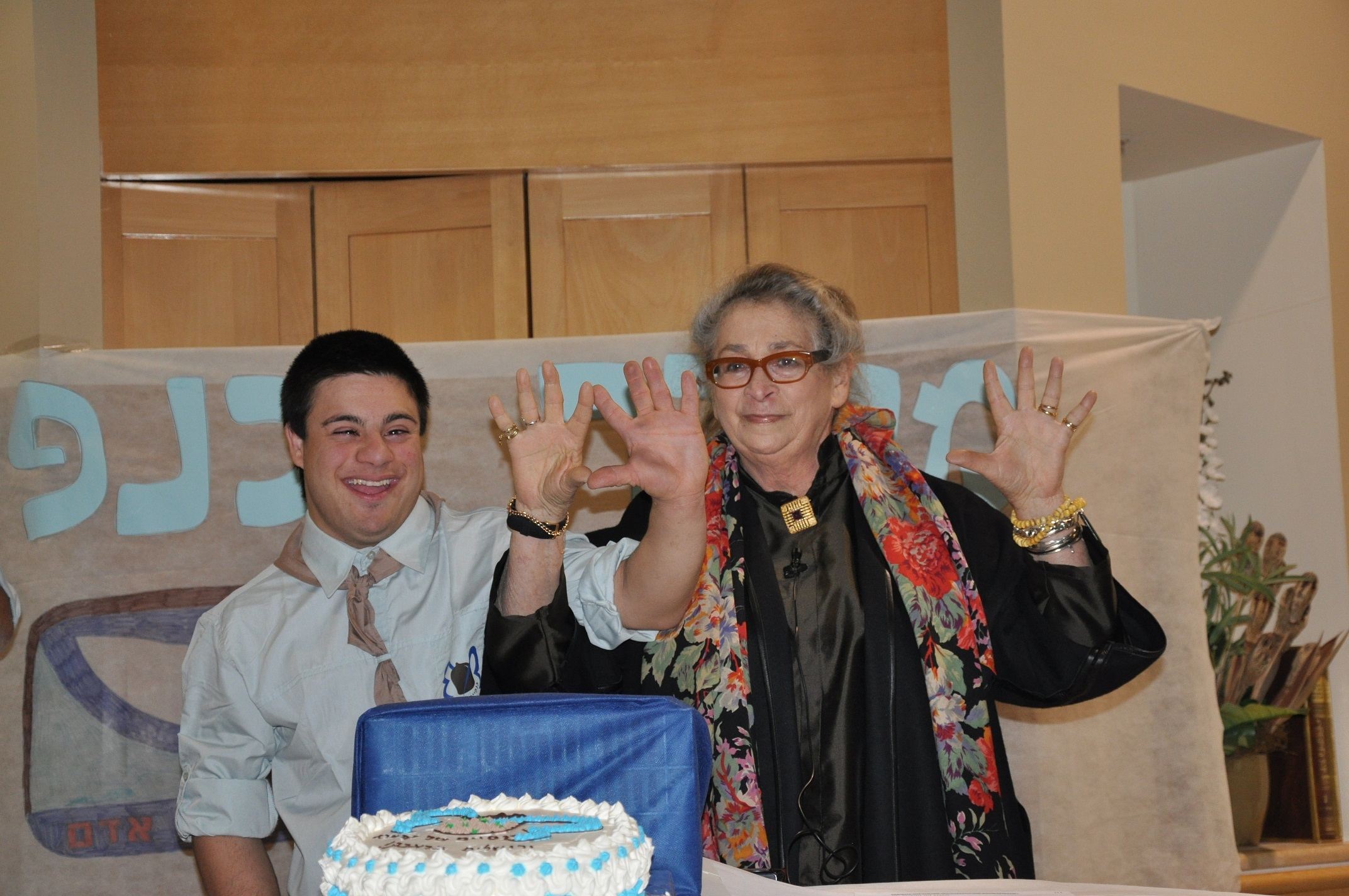
- Nechama Rivlin at the Wing Order ceremony of Krembo Wings
- Formation: 2002
- Founder: Adi Altschuler; Claudia Kobi
- Purpose: supports individuals with special needs
- Chief Executive Officer: Talia Harel Bejerano
- Website: https://www.krembo.org.il/en/

Krembo Wings (Hebrew: כנפיים של קרמבו; Pronunciation: K’nafaim Shel Krembo) is an Israeli organisation for children and youth with and without special needs. The movement has about 100 branches all over Israel and holds weekly activities for children and young people with various disabilities (physical, cognitive and others) from all cultural, religious, and socio-economic backgrounds. All the activities in the movement are led by youth. In 2018, Krembo Wings has been chosen by the United Nations as a special advisor organization.

== Name ==
The movement's name is based on the Israeli treat Krembo, which are hand wrapped since no machine can wrap them gently enough.

The name originated from an activity that happened in the first year of the movement when the counselors brought a bag of Krembos as it is a treat that children with special needs can easily eat. This inspired them to call the movement after the treat because each individual is “wrapped” and cared for individually just like Krembo.

The wings symbolize the organization's mission to give each child 'wings' to "fly above their disabilities".

== History ==
In 2002, Adi Altschuler, who was 16 at the time, joined "LEAD"(he), a leadership development program. She was inspired to create Krembo wings after volunteering at the age of 11 at ILAN organization with Kfir Kobi, a three-year-old with cerebral palsy who later died. She and Claudia Kobi, Kfir's mother, formed the first branch of Krembo wings which started as a small group of disabled and not disabled kids in Hod Hasharon. The group grew and became a youth movement with branches across Israel. The movement is led by teenagers. Altschuler had stated that the reason she established Krembo Wings is "so that Kfir, and children and youth like him, can have a social life; so they’re not lonely; so they have the same opportunities as everyone. But actually, it’s not just for them, it’s for me, it’s for us, so that we’re not alone.”

In 2004, the movement received the Ramon Signal (then the Tamari Signal) for quality, leadership and excellence.

In 2005, the movement received The Bernstein Letter for Volunteering and Social Leadership.

In 2008, a representative of the organization lighted the Beacon on the Israeli 60th Independence Day.

In 2009, Altschuler and Krembo Wings received the Presidential Award for Volunteerism.

In 2013, the movement received the Southern District Education Ministry Award for Life in Omwell, a member of the movement's executive committee.

In 2014, the movement received the Yigal Alon Award.

The movement grew and in 2009 it had eight branches and 273 members. Today the movement has 92 branches and about 9,000 members. The branches exist in communities from every cultural background including Jewish, Arab, Beduin and more.

In 2018, Krembo Wings became a special advisor organization to the United Nations.

== Structure ==
Krembo Wings holds weekly social activities for children and young people aged from seven to 22 with different kinds of disabilities. The activities are held by teenagers who volunteer as youth counselors. The only adults in the branch are the adult coordinator, usually a university student in their twenties, who is in charge of the overall branch activity, and a nursing care worker, who takes care of the members’ hygienic needs. The movement teaches the counsellors skills necessary to make accessible and inclusive activities. The activities take place in a model of individual tutoring, in a group setting.

Krembo Wings holds an accessible summer camp every summer.

The movement also has a training center which provides educational seminars and lectures on inclusion for organizations and companies.

=== The movement's values ===
- I Love – “Love your fellow as yourself”
- I Am a Friend – Mutual Commitment
- I'm a Leader – Commitment, Responsibility, and Leadership
- I Am Israeli
- I Can – Abilities and Independence
- I Belong – Belonging, Inclusion, Mutuality
