= List of ambassadors of Israel to Kenya =

== List of ambassadors ==
- Oded Joseph 2019 -
- Noah Gal Gendler 2017 - 2019
- Yahel Vilan 2015 - 2017
- Shalom Cohen 2014 - 2015
- Gil Haskel 2011 - 2014
- Jacob Keidar 2007 - 2011
- Emanuel Seri 2003 - 2007
- Yaacov Amitai 1999 - 2003
- Menashe Zipori 1994 - 1999
- Arye Oded
- Arie Ivtsan 1988 - 1991
- Mordechai Yedid 1980 - 1982
- Zeev Dover 1975 - 1977
- Reuven Dafni 1969 - 1973
- Arieh Eilan 1963 - 1966
