= List of ambassadors of Israel to Uzbekistan =

Ambassador of Israel to Uzbekistan
- Coat of Arms of Israel
- Nominator: Prime Minister of Israel

== List of ambassadors ==
- Zehavit Ben-Hillel 2020 -
- Eddie Shapira 2017 - 2020
- Carmela Shamir 2013 - 2017
- Hillel Newman 2008 - 2013
- Emanuel Mehl 2004-2008
- Zvi Cohen-Litant 2002 - 2004
- Noah Gal Gendler 1997-2002
- Israel Mey-Ami 1992 - 1994
