= List of ambassadors of Israel to Seychelles =

The Ambassador from Israel to Seychelles is Israel's foremost diplomatic representative in Seychelles.

== List of ambassadors ==
- Oded Joseph (Non-Resident, Nairobi) 2019 -
- Noah Gal Gendler (Non-Resident, Nairobi) 2017 - 2019
- Jacob Keidar (Non-Resident, Nairobi) 2007 - 2011
