= Sarban minaret =

Sareban Minaret منار ساربان
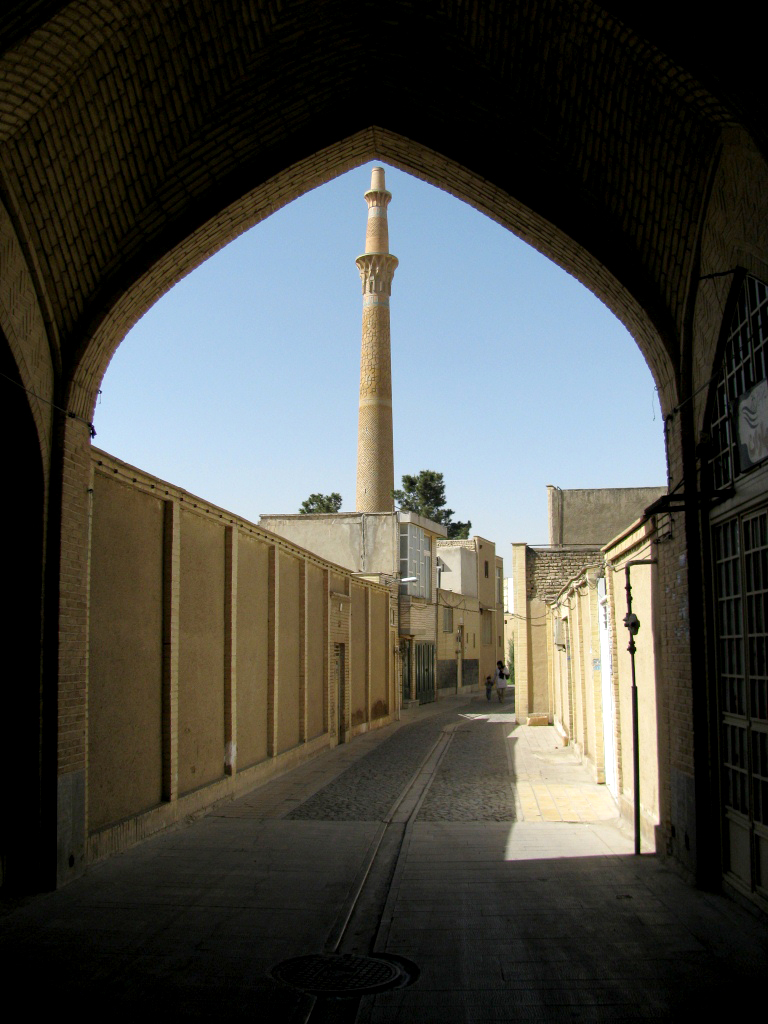

- Location within Iran

Religion
- Province: Isfahan

Location
- Location: Jouybareh district, Isfahan, Iran
- Municipality: Isfahan
- Coordinates: 32.668611°N 51.693056°E

Architecture
- Type: Minaret
- Style: Razi
- Materials: Bricks and Tiles
- Iran National Heritage List
- Official name: Sareban Minaret
- Type: Minaret
- Designated: 1935
- Reference no.: 232
- Conservation organization: Cultural Heritage, Handicrafts and Tourism Organization of Iran

Sarban minaret (Persian: مناره ساربان) is a historic Seljuk era minaret in Isfahan, Iran. The Sarban minaret is located in the north of Jouybareh district, not far from Chehel Dokhtaran minaret. It seems that there was a mosque beside this minaret in the past, but it does not exist any more. The minaret consists of seven different parts. The first part has brick bolster work. The second and third parts have masterly decorative brickwork. The fourth part is its first crown, which has brick muqarnas with turquoise tiles. The fifth part has decorative bricks. The sixth part is the second crown and the seventh part is the vertex of the minaret. The minaret is 54 m high and is the highest historical minaret in the Isfahan province.
