= Dalia Fadila =

Israeli educator (1971/1972–2023)

- داليا الفضيلة
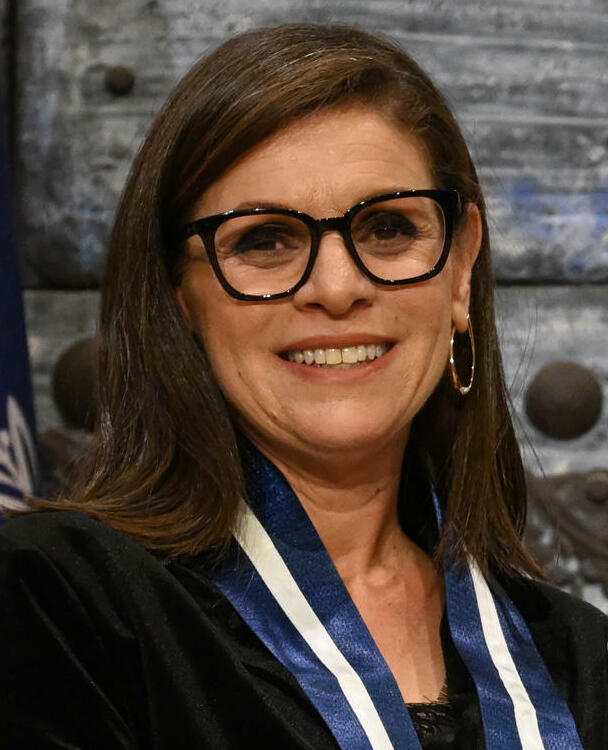
- Fadila in 2022
- Born: 1971/1972; Tira, Israel
- Died: 4 August 2023 (aged 51); Herzliya, Israel
- Education: Bar-Ilan University
- Occupation: Educator
- Known for: Developing new curriculum, textbooks and schools
- Spouse: Abed al-Salem Fadila
- Children: 3
- Awards: Presidential Medal of Honor

Dalia Fadila (Arabic: داليا الفضيلة, Hebrew: דליה פדילה; 1971 or 1972 – 4 August 2023) was an Israeli educator. She developed a new curriculum, textbooks, and schools in Israel and Jordan, which are designed to teach English to Arab schoolchildren. She was the first Arab woman to found and manage an education chain in Israel.

== Early life and education ==
Fadila was born in Tira, Israel. Her father was the head of education there.

She earned a B.A, a master's in female minority literature and a PhD on the works of the Jordanian-American writer Diana Abu-Jaber, from Bar Ilan University. With her parents' support, Fadila and her sister became the first women from Tira to attend university. She experienced "difficulty communicating" with Jewish students at Bar-Ilan, feeling at times that she was held responsible for Iraq's attacks on Ramat Gan (where Bar-Ilan is located). Fadila found support and inspiration from the Jewish-American professors in the university’s English department, saying that they presented role models for succeeding as a minority.

While completing her first two degrees, she taught English literature at a high school in Tira for three years. Her teaching ended after three years because of complaints from parents, who disapproved of her focus on literary analysis in the classroom and wanted her to focus on grammar and students' grades.

== Career ==
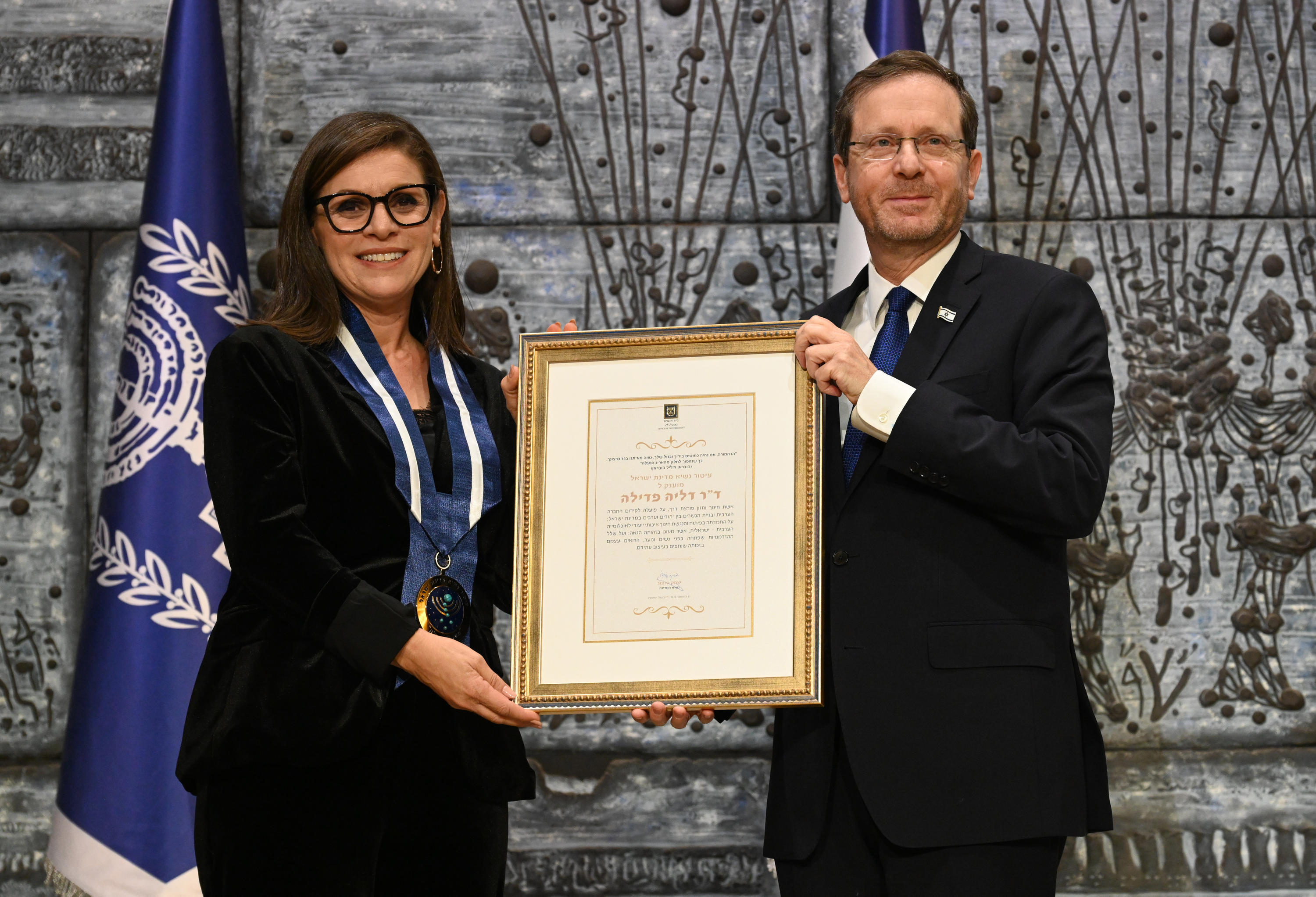
Fadila receiving the President's Medal from Israeli President Isaac Herzog.

The Israeli Ministry of Education named her for a teaching position in Baqa al-Gharbiyye near Haifa, at the Al-Qasemi Academic College of Education. Beginning in 2002, her coursework there included D. H. Lawrence's The Horse Dealer's Daughter, and Alice Walker's Everyday Use. Initially, both teaching staff and students complained that these coursework threatened Islamic morals. Her appointment as head of the English Department helped al-Qasemi Academy secure accreditation as an officially recognized Israeli college. After presiding as dean of the college of over 4,000 students for a year during the chairman's sabbatical, she was appointed head of al-Qasemi's faculty of engineering. During her tenure, the academy raised its enrollment from 100 to 1,000 students.

Fadila opened the first branch of a network of private schools in her hometown of Tira in 2008, and by 2016 she had created similar institutions in Nazareth, Jaljulia, Tayibe, East Jerusalem, Ramallah in the West Bank and in the Jordanian capital of Amman in 2012. A Ted talk she gave had caught the attention of Jordanian educators who invited her to set up a school in Amman. Within a decade, her five schools had been attended by over 2,000 students. Many American Jewish communities, impressed by her work, have funded scholarships for her poorer students.

Fadila was also a member of former President Reuven Rivlin's Israeli Tikva Committee, a member of the Health Basket Committee, a former lecturer at Reichman University on "The Dilemmas of the Arab Sector in Israel", a member of Edmond de Rothschild Foundation's Executive Committee, and co-CEO of the Atidna Association in Israel.

In 2022 Fadila was awarded the Israeli Presidential Medal of Honor, with Isaac Herzog praising her as a "groundbreaking educator and visionary, for her work to advance Arab society and build bridges between Jews and Arabs in the Land of Israel".

== Personal life and death ==
Fadila was married to Abed al-Salem Fadila, a trauma coordinator at Meir Medical Centre in Kfar Saba. She was a mother of three.

She became a feminist in her early years and explored the Arabic language literary genre of feminism, but she abandoned the ideology later in her life. She said one problem facing Arabs in Israel is that they live in "ambivalent chaos" as Palestinian, Muslim, Arab, and Israeli. They must "begin to grasp the need".

On 4 August 2023, at the age of 51, Fadila was visiting the Sharon beach with her husband. Dalia, who did not know how to swim, entered the water but was swept away and drowned. A passerby noticed her in the water and pulled her to the beach, after which she was given CPR. Despite the interventions of passersby, as well as paramedics' assistance, she was pronounced dead later that evening. Fadila's husband Abed, interviewed by Channel 13 soon after his wife's death, said that his goal was for himself and his family to continue his late wife's pioneering work in education.

== Sources ==
- Corlett, John (10 September 2017). "Mission to Israel brings home lessons for Cleveland". The Plain Dealer. Cleveland.
- Green, Miranda (27 November 2016). "Dalia Fadila teaches Israeli-Arab students girl power". Financial Times.
- Lieber, Dov (12 January 2016). "Maverick educator seeks to change Israeli Arab world from within". The Times of Israel.
- Maltz, Judy (30 August 2017). "How Have Some Arab High Schools Become Israel's Top Performers?". Haaretz.
- Wiener, Robert (25 February 2015). "Israeli-Arab women tell of trials, triumphs". The Times of Israel.
