= The Fourth Quarter =

Israeli social movement

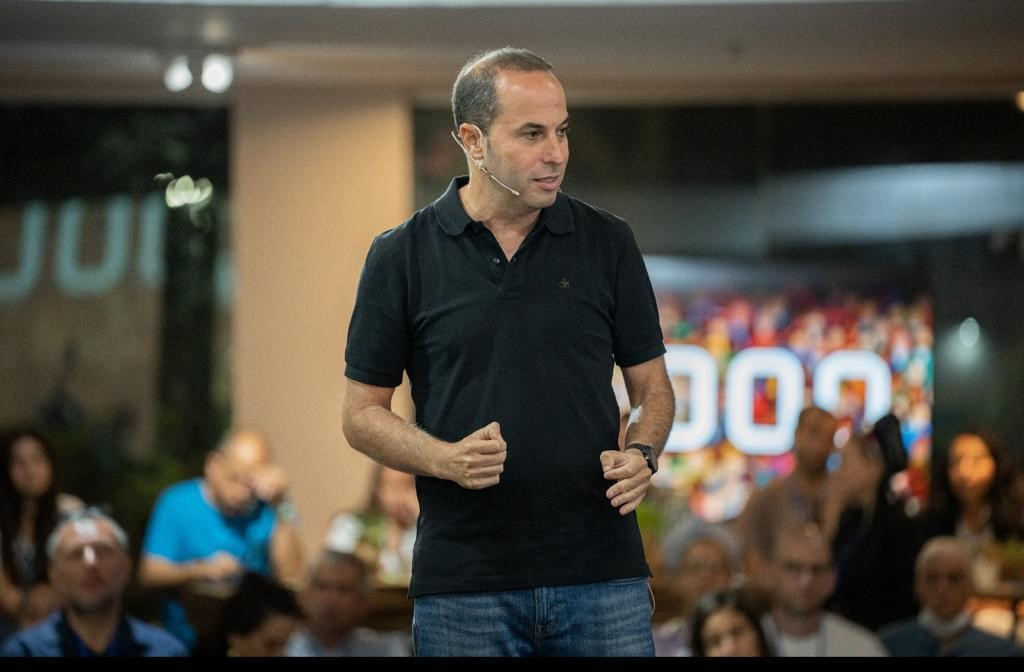
- Yoav Heller lecturing at a Fourth Quarter seminar
- Established: 2022
- Founders: Yoav Heller, Ela Ringel, Uri Herman, Eitan Zeligar

The Fourth Quarter (Hebrew: הרבעון הרביעי) is an Israeli social movement that seeks to create political power with the vision of "ensuring the future of the State of Israel as a Jewish, democratic, and prosperous state".

The movement was founded in 2022. Its name refers to the argument of its chairman, Yoav Heller, that the State of Israel has entered the "fourth quarter" of its existence, between its 75th and 100th years. During this period, he notes, both the Kingdom of Solomon and the Hasmonean Kingdom collapsed due to internal strife that weakened them and enabled their enemies to destroy them. Accordingly, the movement seeks to build broad agreements to ensure the state's survival.

The movement announced in June 2026 that it would form a party and contest the 2026 Israeli legislative election.

== Establishment ==
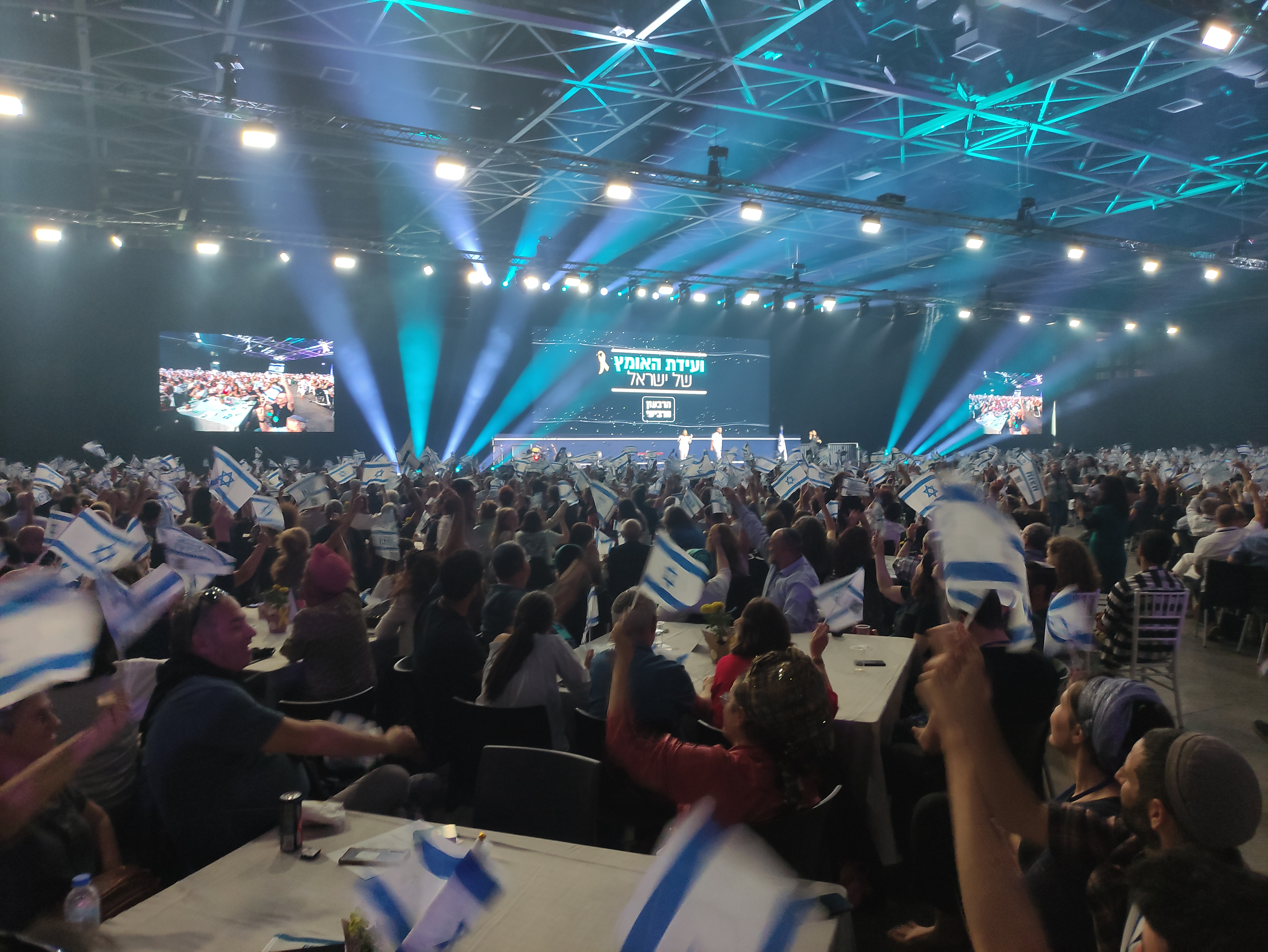
The Courage Conference of Israel, May 2024

The movement was established in 2022 by about one hundred public activists, led by Yoav Heller, Ela Ringel, Uri Herman and Eitan Zeligar, in response to the political and social crisis in Israel surrounding the five consecutive election rounds from 2019 to 2022. The movement views this crisis as a symptom of deeper problems in Israeli society, foremost among them the lack of trust both among citizens and between citizens and state institutions.

In collaboration with Israeli scholars and thinkers, members of the movement promote a shift from conflict aimed at defeating the other side to what they call "trust-building conflict". In this framework, the aim is not to eliminate disputes or reach compromises, but to transform discourse into one oriented toward building trust. Together with David Biton, the movement defined its activity as creating a "politics of hospitality".

The movement was founded during the Thirty-sixth government of Israel ("Bennett–Lapid government") and expanded significantly during the Thirty-seventh government of Israel amid the public debate on the 2023 Israeli judicial reform.

On 8 June 2023 the movement held its first conference, attended by about 2,000 activists at Expo Tel Aviv.

On 30 June 2024, the movement held another conference, "The Courage Conference", with about 5,000 participants, during which it launched the "Israeli Story" document written through a participatory process.

In September 2024, amid the ongoing Operation Iron Swords and the hostage crisis, the movement launched a campaign calling for the establishment of a national unity government.

In December 2024, the movement presented a phased outline for setting the "rules of the game" of Israeli democracy, particularly in the context of the judicial reform debate. It called for strengthening the Knesset alongside measures to regulate balances between government and judiciary.

=== Outline for judicial appointments and electoral reform ===
In the first stage described as a "tourniquet" urgently needed to prevent civil war the proposal included:

- Requiring broad consensus (at least 75 MKs) for passing Basic Laws;
- Limiting the ability of the Supreme Court to strike down laws, allowing it only in an expanded panel with a majority of 8 out of 11 justices;
- Defining the Attorney General's role so that ministers are bound by legal advice, but the government as a whole may decide against it and be represented privately in petitions to the High Court of Justice;
- Changing the composition of the Judicial Appointments Committee by increasing the majority needed to appoint Supreme Court justices, requiring broad coalition-opposition agreement, mandating representation from the periphery (three representatives) and women, and considering diversity in appointments.

In May 2025 the movement held internal leadership elections, open to all members via digital voting. Yoav Heller was re-elected, defeating leadership member Moshe Turgeman.

== Principles ==
=== Broad agreement ===
As part of the "Israeli Story", the movement seeks to align Israel's citizens around basic principles of the state:

- Zionist core – striving for an independent, sovereign, strong state.
- Jewish core – seeing the state as founded on Jewish cultural foundations, in the spirit of the Declaration of Independence.
- Democratic–liberal core – the ideal of including and hearing all residents of the state and making decisions according to the will of the citizens.
- Arab core – recognition that Israel is also home to Arab citizens, who share in its culture, ideals, and essence.

=== Future-oriented discourse ===
The civic discourse promoted by the movement emphasizes a future-oriented agenda, focusing on three key issues:

- Nation of education and mobility – recognizing Israel must lead in education and social mobility.
- Nation of technology – as the "Start-up Nation", Israel should continue excelling in technology.
- Nation of charity and volunteering – strengthening and expanding Israel's many charitable and volunteer initiatives.

=== Relationship with state institutions ===
Movement activists seek to change dynamics and strengthen ties between state institutions and local government, as well as between the social and business sectors, to encourage regional, entrepreneurial, and innovative solutions to public problems.

== Activities ==
- Salons – Movement leaders visit citizens’ homes across Israel to discuss its values and the "politics of hospitality", as well as recruiting new members. Hundreds of such meetings have been held nationwide with tens of thousands of participants.
- Seminars – The movement holds seminars across the country with lectures by its leaders and group discussions. As of May 2023, 18 seminars had been held with 1,300 participants.
- Field activity – Volunteers conduct outreach by opening booths, organizing tours, Zoom meetings, and local groups.
