= Carmela Shamir =

Female Israeli ambassador

Carmela Shamir (Hebrew: כרמלה שמיר) was the first female Israeli ambassador to Uzbekistan. In 2021, she was named Consul General to Munich, Germany,

== Diplomatic career ==
Carmela Shamir was Israel's ambassador to Uzbekistan from 2013 until 2017. Her deputy ambassador, Hagit Mualem, was also a woman.

Before serving as ambassador she was deputy director of the North American department at Israel's Ministry of Foreign Affairs.

== See also ==
- Women of Israel
