= List of ambassadors of Israel to Switzerland =

== List of ambassadors ==
- Ifat Reshef 2022 -
- Jacob Keidar 2016 - 2022
- Yigal Baruch Caspi 2012 - 2016
- Ilan Elgar 2006 - 2011
- Aviv Shir-On 2003 - 2006
- Yigal Antebi (diplomat) 2001 - 2003
- Yitzhak Mayer 1997 - 2001
- Rafael Gvir 1991 - 1995
- Yehuda Horam 1988 - 1991
- David Rivlin 1985 - 1988
- Yohanan Meroz 1983 - 1985
- Matitiahu Adler1980 - 1983
- Yaacov Shimoni 1976 - 1979
- Shmuel Bentsur 1962 - 1967
- Mesholam Veron 1961 - 1962
- Joseph Ivor Linton 1958-1961
- Minister Yeshayahu Aviad 1956
- Minister Shmuel Tolkowsky 1951 - 1956 (Consul General 1949 - 1951)

=== Consulate (Zürich) ===
- Consul General Yitzhak Mayer 1979
- Consul General Gavriel Gavrieli 1976 - 1979
