= Ofra Farhi =

Israel's Ambassador to Zambia, Namibia, and Botswana

Her Excellency Ofra Farhi
- עפרה פרחי
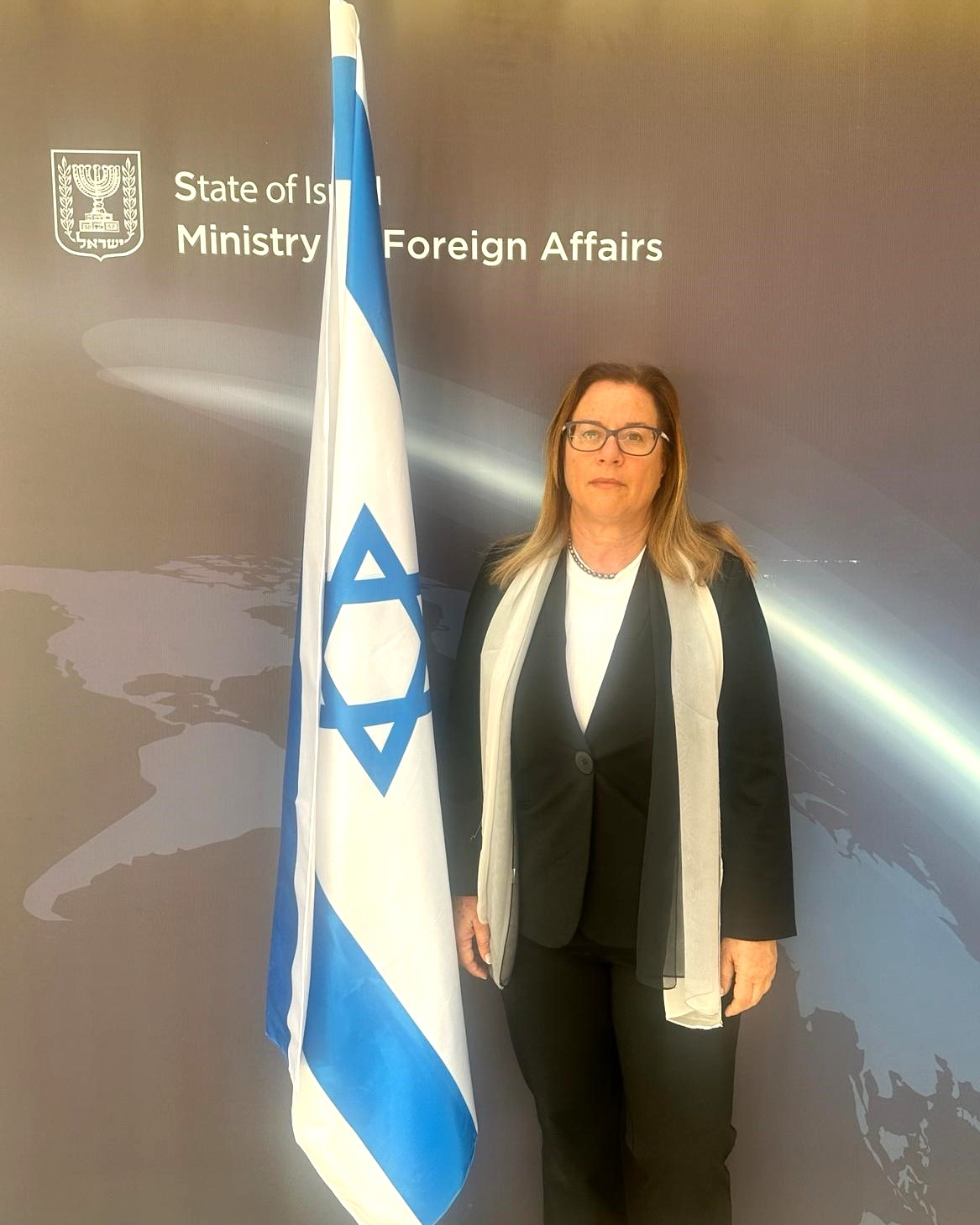

Israel Ambassador to Zambia
- President: Isaac Herzog

Personal details
- Born: Illinois, United States
- Education: Beit Berl College; Bar-Ilan University
- As of 2025, resident ambassador to Zambia and roving ambassador to Zimbabwe, Botswana, and Namibia

Ofra Farhi (Hebrew: עפרה פרחי) is the Israeli ambassador to Zambia, and non-resident ambassador to Zimbabwe, Namibia, and Botswana. In 2025, it was announced that she would be the resident ambassador in Israel's new embassy in Zambia, where she was previously a roving ambassador, residing in Israel.

In February 2023, while crossing the street in Lusaka, Zambia, people pulled up alongside her and stole her bag, which contained her diplomatic passport and cellphone. Her bodyguard was unable to prevent the theft.
