= Isaac Leib Goldberg =

Jewish philanthropist (1860–1935)

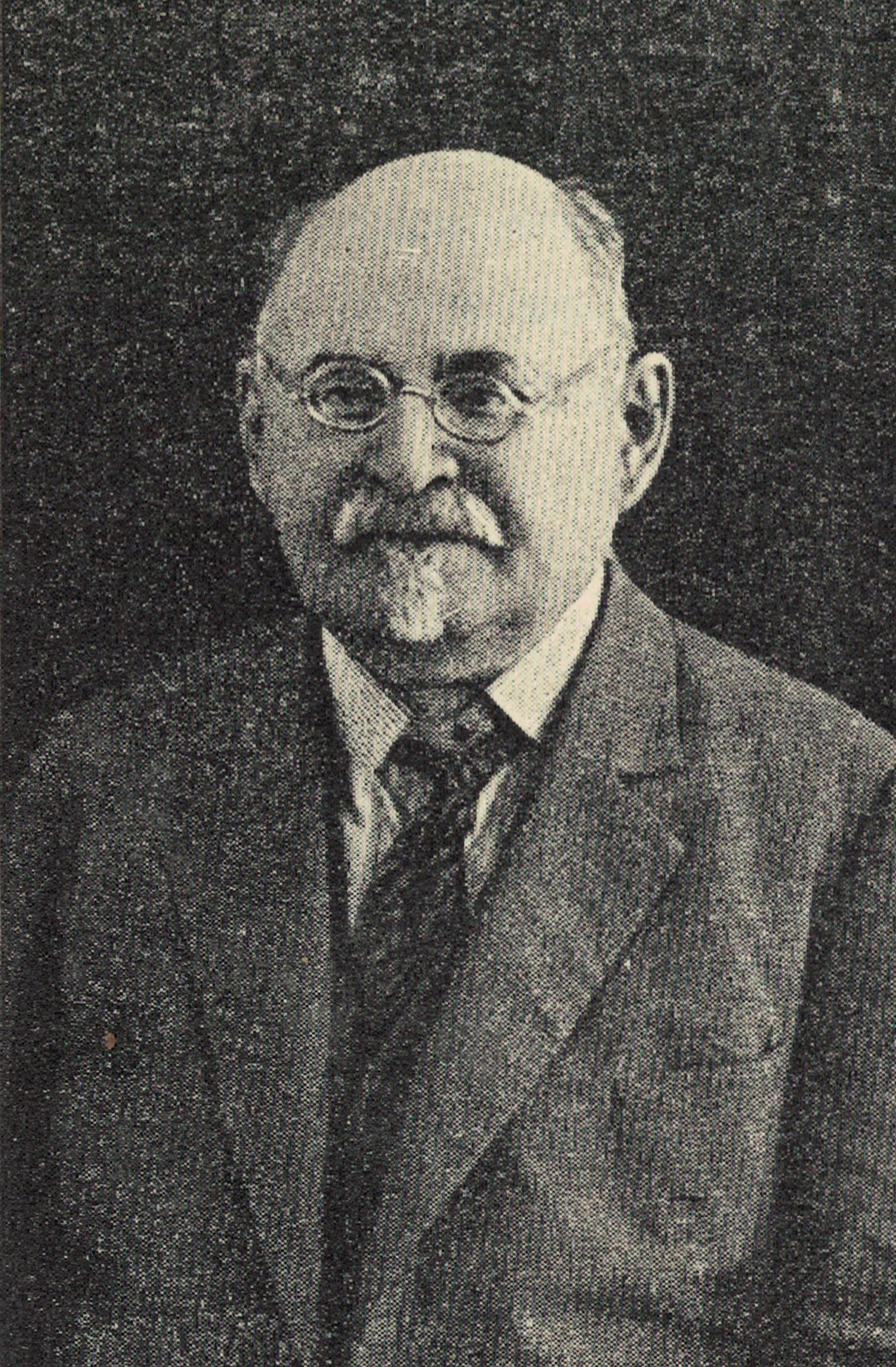
- Born: 7 February 1860; Szaki, Congress Poland, Russian Empire
- Died: 14 September 1935 (aged 75); Switzerland
- Movement: Zionism
- Parents: Alexander Sander HaLevi Goldberg (father); Liba Segal (mother)
- Relatives: Shmuel Tolkowsky (son-in-law); Dan Tolkowsky (grandson)

Isaac Leib Goldberg (Hebrew: יצחק לייב גולדברג, 7 February 1860 – 14 September 1935) was a Zionist leader and philanthropist in both Ottoman Palestine and the Russian Empire, and one of the principal founders of Rishon LeZion, the first Zionist settlement founded in the Land of Israel by the New Yishuv. An early member of the Hovevei Zion movement (1882), he also founded the Ohavei Zion society. Goldberg was a delegate to the First Zionist Congress and the founder of two Hebrew newspapers, Ha'aretz (today Israel's oldest daily newspaper) and Ha'am.

== Biography ==
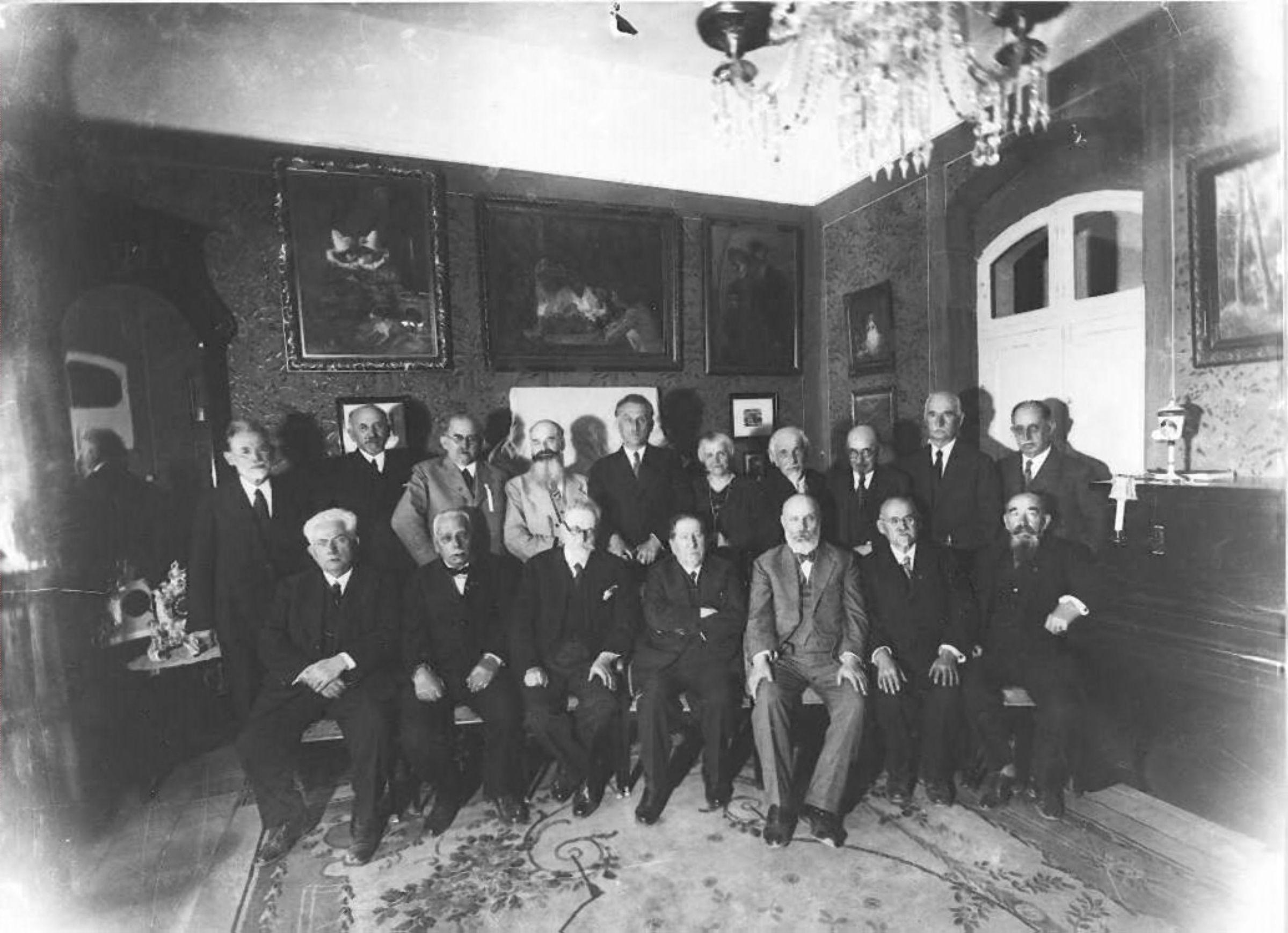
Isaac Leib Goldberg with participants of First Zionist Congress in Jerusalem

Isaac (Yitzchak) Leib Goldberg was born on 7 February 1860 in Szaki, Congress Poland (present-day Šakiai, Lithuania) to Alexander Sander HaLevi Goldberg and Liba Segal. His brother was Boris Goldberg. In his early years, Goldberg studied at Kovno Yeshiva and settled in Vilnius, Lithuania. His wife was Rachel Pinnes and they had five children, Hannah Tolkowsky (wife of Shmuel Tolkowsky), Shulamit Hochfeld, Samuel Goldberg, Yehudit Klibanov, and Binyamin Zeev Goldberg.

In 1903 the first plot of land for the Jewish National Fund was given as a gift by Goldberg for growing olives in Israel. In 1908 he purchased the first plot of land on Mount Scopus, Jerusalem for the future Hebrew University. Isaac Leib Goldberg also helped create the Geulah Company for private land acquisition and sale in Israel, and the Carmel Company for sale of kosher wine.

In 1919 he co-founded the newspaper Haaretz in Jerusalem. His son Binyamin Zeev was killed in Tel Aviv in the 1929 Palestine riots. Ramat Gan's Tel Binyamin neighborhood was named in his honor.

Upon his death, in Switzerland on 14 September 1935, Goldberg bequeathed one half of his estate to the Jewish National Fund for the promotion of Hebrew language and culture. This donation, known as the Isaac Leib and Rachel Goldberg Fund, amounted to roughly $30 million by today's standards. Goldberg was buried in Trumpeldor Cemetery in Tel Aviv, Israel.

== See also ==
- Maurice de Hirsch (1831–1896), German Jewish financier and philanthropist, founder of the Jewish Colonization Association
- Edmond James de Rothschild (1845–1934), French Jewish banker and major donor of the Zionist project
