= List of ambassadors of Israel to Liechtenstein =

The Ambassador from Israel to Liechtenstein is Israel's foremost diplomatic representative in Liechtenstein.

== List of ambassadors ==
- Ifat Reshef 2021-
- Jacob Keidar (Non-Resident, Bern) 2016 - 2022

=== Former Ambassadors ===
- Consul General Yitzhak Mayer (Non-Resident, Zürich) 1979
- Consul General Gavriel Gavrieli (Non-Resident, Zürich) 1976 - 1979
