= List of ambassadors of Israel to Uganda =

== List of ambassadors ==
- Oded Joseph (Non-Resident, Nairobi) 2019 -
- Noah Gal Gendler (Non-Resident, Nairobi) 2017 - 2019
- Jacob Keidar (Non-Resident, Nairobi) 2007 - 2011
- Aharon Ofri 1968 - 1971
- Uri Lubrani 1965 - 1967
- Michael Michael (diplomat) 1962 - 1965
