= Nadav Ben Yehuda =

Israeli mountaineer and SAR specialist

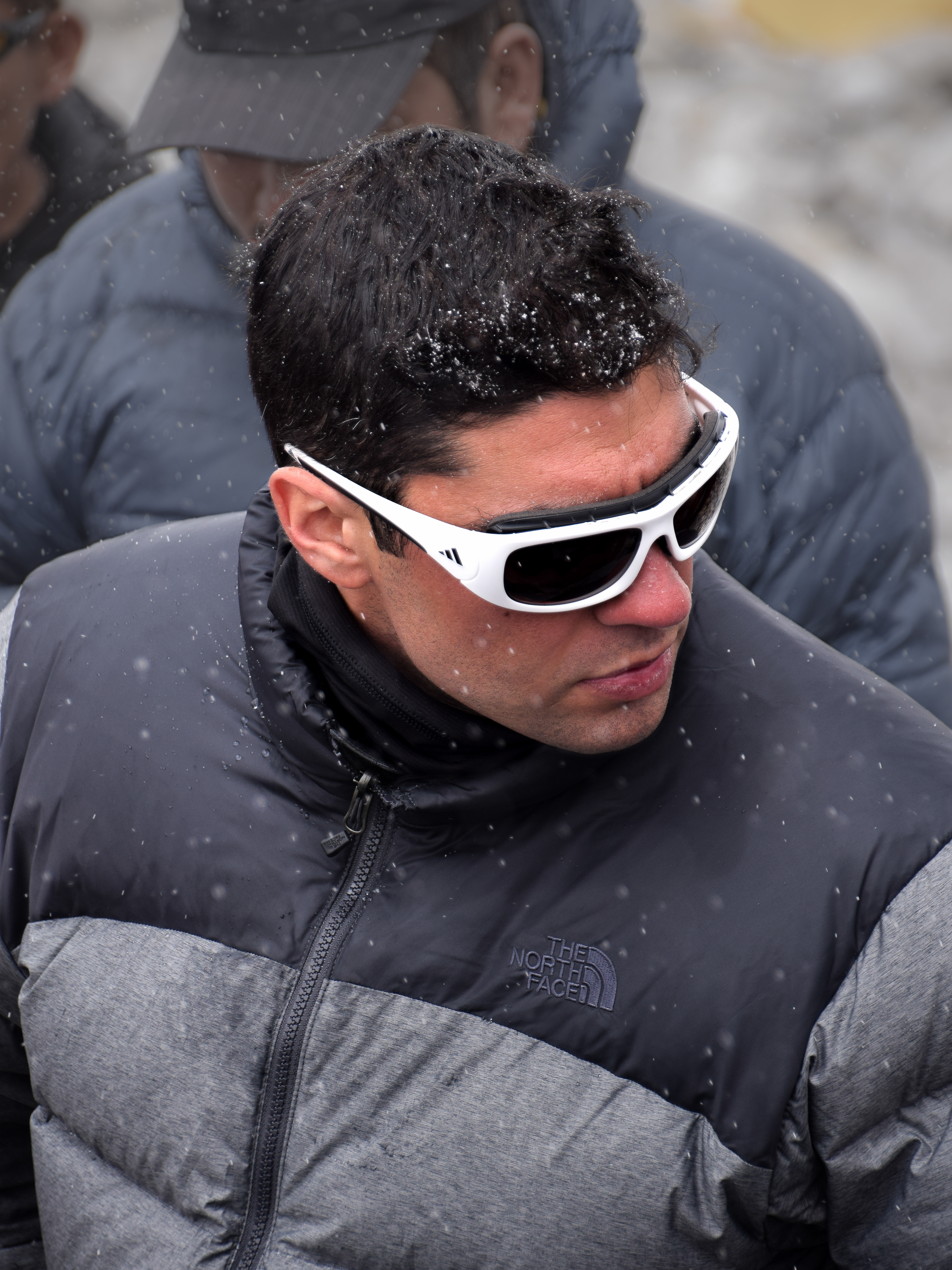
- Nadav Ben Yehuda during a climbing project in the Himalayas (2014).

Personal information
- Native name: נדב בן יהודה
- Nationality: Israeli
- Born: February 29, 1988 (age 38)
- Height: 191 cm (6 ft 3 in)
- Website: http://www.nadav.by/

Climbing career
- Type of climber: Alpine • Ice • Mixed • Rock • High Altitude
- Known for: First Israeli to climb Mount Annapurna 1, the deadliest mountain in the world • First Israeli to climb the highest mountain in Europe during the winter season • The Israeli climber who crossed the 8,000 meters altitude the most times • The Israeli champion of Skyscrapers Stair Climbing

Nadav Ben Yehuda (Hebrew: נדב בן יהודה; born February 29, 1988) is an Israeli mountain climber, search and rescue professional, photographer and speaker. He is the first Israeli to climb Mount Annapurna 1, and the Israeli who climbed the most mountains of above 8,000 meters.

In 2012, while climbing Mount Everest and about 300 meters below the summit, Ben Yehuda encountered an unconscious and severely injured climber, Aydin Irmak originally from Turkey, and immediately began rescue efforts that also involved his own risk of life. During the descent he had to remove the gloves from his right hand, and his oxygen system ceased to function. The rescue ended successfully with both men alive, but as a result Ben Yehuda suffered severe physical injuries, including serious concerns of an amputation of his right hand's fingers. For this act he was awarded the Israeli Presidential Medal of Honor and the FIU Medallion of Courage. During that climbing season of spring 2012, 11 climbers died on Mount Everest.

On March 9, 2012, Ben Yehuda broke the Israeli record of climbing skyscrapers in the Run-Up category, setting it on 19,721 stairs when he climbed the highest tower in Israel – the Moshe Aviv Tower, for 13 consecutive times.

In September 2012, Ben Yehuda raised the flag of Israel that was awarded to him by President Shimon Peres on the summit of Mount Kazbek in Georgia – one of the highest peaks in the Caucasus Mountains.

In October 2012, Ben Yehuda performed an alpine solo climb of the two highest mountains in the Pyrenees.

In 2014, Ben Yehuda went to climb two mountains of over 8,000 meters in a single season, and raised an Organ Donation Card on the summit of the world's sixth highest mountain, Cho Oyu (8,206 meters above sea level).

At the beginning of October 2014, Ben Yehuda was called by the Ministry of Foreign Affairs and the Israeli Embassy in Nepal for search and rescue missions during the snowstorm disaster in the Nepali Himalayas. The disaster was caused by the cyclone Hudhud, and resulted in the death of 43 people, 50 went missing and more than 175 were wounded. Four Israelis were killed in the disaster.

At the end of October 2014, Ben Yehuda was sent by the Israeli Embassy in Nepal for a rescue mission at a crash site of a bus that overturned and fell over a cliff in the Langtang range area. The accident resulted in the death of 14 people and more than 50 were wounded. Two Israeli women travelers were killed in the accident, and four others were injured in various degrees.

In 2014 Ben Yehuda was chosen for the Best Athlete award in the Alpine climbing field, by the Israeli Association for Non-Olympic Competitive Sports.

In January 2015, Ben Yehuda climbed Mount Kilimanjaro, the highest mountain on the African continent. On the summit he proposed marriage to his partner Lena Malenkovich, and they got married during the same year.

In 2015, Ben Yehuda became the first Israeli to climb to the summit of Mount Elbrus in the winter season. This is a significant feat because during the winter the temperatures on the mountain drops to less than 55 Celsius degrees below zero, and the winds blow at more than 85 kilometers per hour.

On May 1, 2016, Ben Yehuda became the first Israeli to climb to the summit of Mount Annapurna I, the tenth highest mountain in the world (8,091 meters above sea level), which is considered as the world's deadliest mountain. Climbing Annapurna is a significant accomplishment due to the high death rate of more than 30%, and until now only about 200 people from all over the world have successfully climbed it. To the summit, Ben Yehuda took the flag of Israel, and another flag bearing the names of Israelis who perished during the disasters in Nepal until that year, who he was involved in the search for many of them.

In September 2017, Ben Yehuda made a fast ascent of an 8,000m mountain without the use of supplemental oxygen or any pre-acclimatization. The chosen mountain was Manaslu (8,163m), the eighth highest mountain in the world, and the entire climb took 14 days.

In February 2017 Ben Yehuda was chosen to the list of the most influential people under the age of 30 by Forbes Magazine.

In May 2018, during a climb without the use of supplemental oxygen of Mount Kangchenjunga, the third highest mountain in the world – Ben Yehuda fell and was injured below the summit of the mountain. He was first considered dead and spent the next night and day in extreme conditions of over 8,000 meters by himself. On the next day he was identified and was rescued with severe frostbites and serious injuries.
