= List of ambassadors of Israel to Zimbabwe =

The Ambassador from Israel to Zimbabwe is Israel's foremost diplomatic representative in Zimbabwe.

== List of ambassadors ==
- Gershon Gan 1994 – 1999
- Itzhak Gerberg 1999 – 2002
- Ofra Farhi 2021-
