= Yifat (given name) =

Yifat or Ifat (Hebrew: יִפְעָת) is a feminine given name. Notable people with this name include:

- Yifat Bitton, Israeli law professor
- Yifat Kariv (born 1973), Israeli politician
- Ifat Reshef (fl. 2021–present), Israeli diplomat
- Yifat Shasha-Biton (born 1973), Israeli educator and politician
- Yifat Tomer-Yerushalmi (born 1974), Israeli major-general
