= Dan Tolkowsky =

Israeli Air Force major general (1921–2025)

- דן טולקובסקי
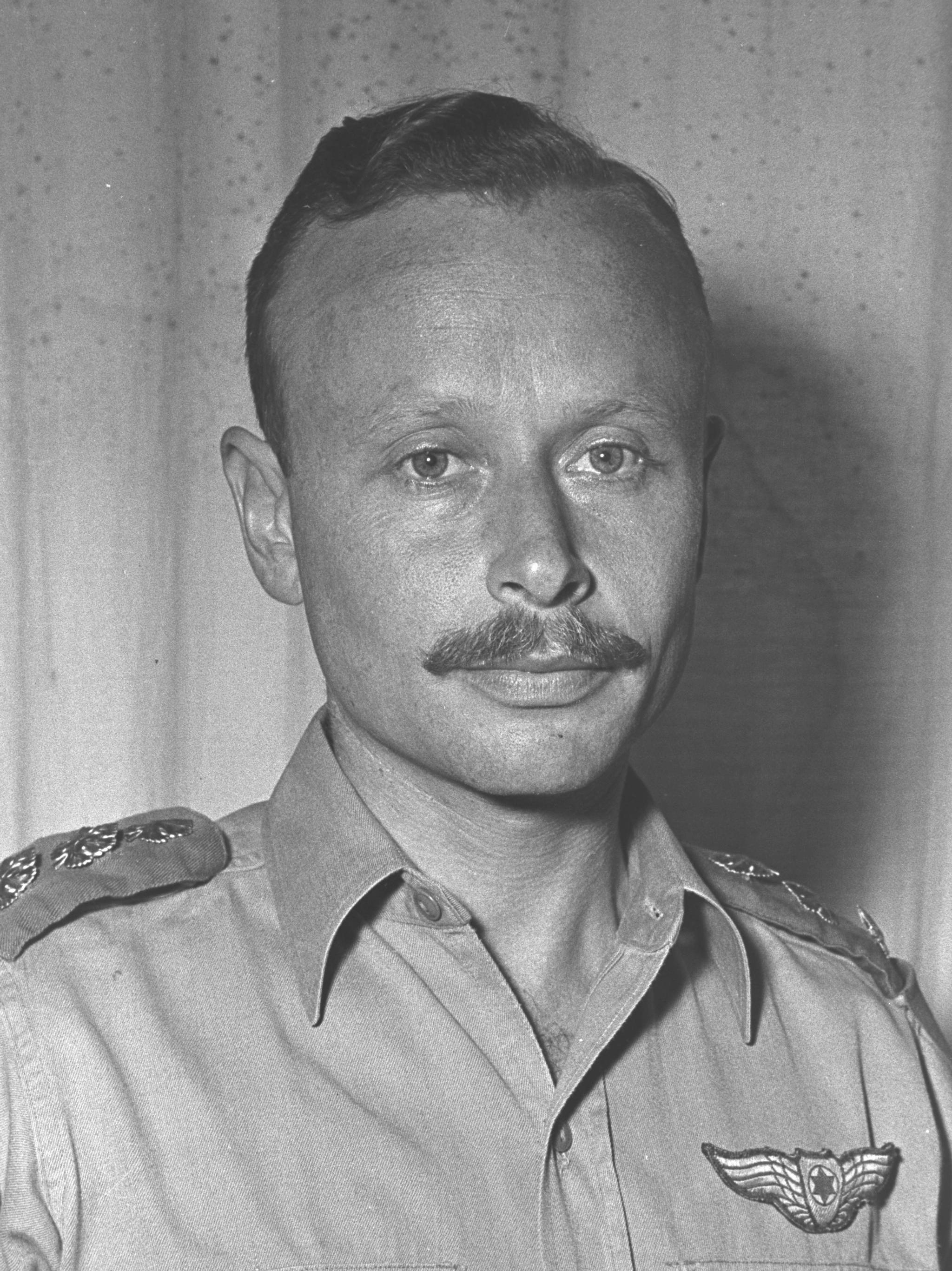
- Tolkowsky in 1953
- Born: 17 January 1921; Tel Aviv, Mandate of Palestine
- Died: 28 November 2025 (aged 104); Tel Aviv, Israel
- Relatives: Isaac Leib Goldberg (grandfather); Shmuel Tolkowsky (father)
- Military career
- Allegiance: United Kingdom; Israel
- Branch: Royal Air Force; Israeli Air Force
- Service years: 1942–1959
- Rank: Aluf
- Conflicts: World War II; 1948 Arab-Israeli War; Suez Crisis
- Other work: Investor for Discount Bank Investment Corporation (1959–1997)

Aluf Dan Tolkowsky (or Tolkovsky, Hebrew: דן טולקובסקי; 17 January 1921 – 28 November 2025) was an Israeli military officer who served as commander of the Israeli Air Force from 1953 to 1958. A noted investor, he helped start the first Israeli venture capital fund.

== Early life and education ==
Tolkowsky was born in Tel Aviv, in what was then the British Mandate of Palestine, on 17 January 1921 to Jewish parents, Shmuel Tolkowsky and Chana Tolkowsky (née Goldberg). He was the grandson of Isaac Leib Goldberg. His father was born in Antwerp, Belgium, his mother in Vilnius, then part of the Russian Empire. During World War I, his parents moved to London, where his two older sisters, Naomi and Ada, were born. He was educated at the Herzliya Hebrew Gymnasium, and in 1936, he joined the Haganah. In 1938, he moved to London to study at Imperial College London and graduated with a B.Sc. in mechanical engineering in 1941.

== Military service ==
In 1942, Tolkowsky volunteered for the Royal Air Force (RAF). He took flight courses in South Africa and Egypt, earning his wings in 1943. He went on to serve as a Spitfire fighter pilot, participating in battles in Italy, southern France, and Greece during World War II. At the end the war, he served as a transport pilot, and was later stationed in Palestine at RAF Lydda (now Lod). He was discharged from the RAF in June 1946 with the rank of flight lieutenant.

After the war, Tolkowsky moved to Britain and worked as a mechanical engineer. In December 1947, he secretly began helping efforts to purchase aircraft for Sherut Avir, the Haganah's air arm and forerunner of the Israeli Air Force (IAF). In 1948, a few days before the Israeli Declaration of Independence, Tolkowsky returned to Palestine. He served in the Israeli Air Force during the 1948 Arab-Israeli War, during which he participated in bombing missions on the Egyptian front.

Between 1948 and 1951, he led the IAF’s training department. He was then appointed chief of staff to IAF commander Haim Laskov until 1953. He was appointed Commander of the IAF in May 1953 and served until July 1958. As commander, he spearheaded the IAF's modernization and acquisition of jet-propelled aircraft. The IAF received its first fighter jets and took part in the 1956 Suez Crisis. After his term as commander ended in 1958, he was succeeded by future president Ezer Weizman. He was then appointed to head the Planning and Scientific Research Administration of the Ministry of Defense until 1959.

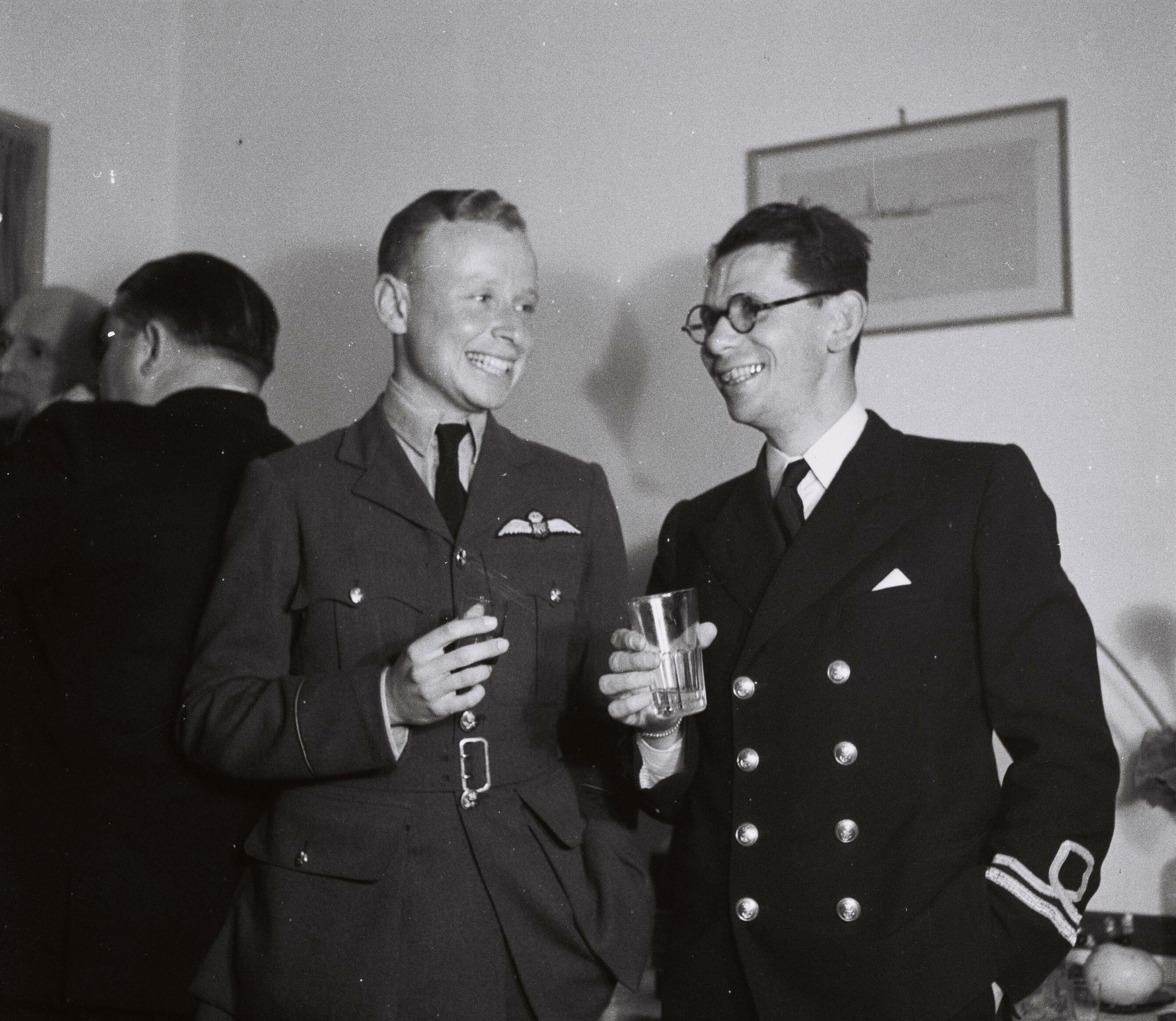
Tolkowsky (left) during his RAF service with a merchant marine officer at the Jewish sailors' club in Haifa, 1944.

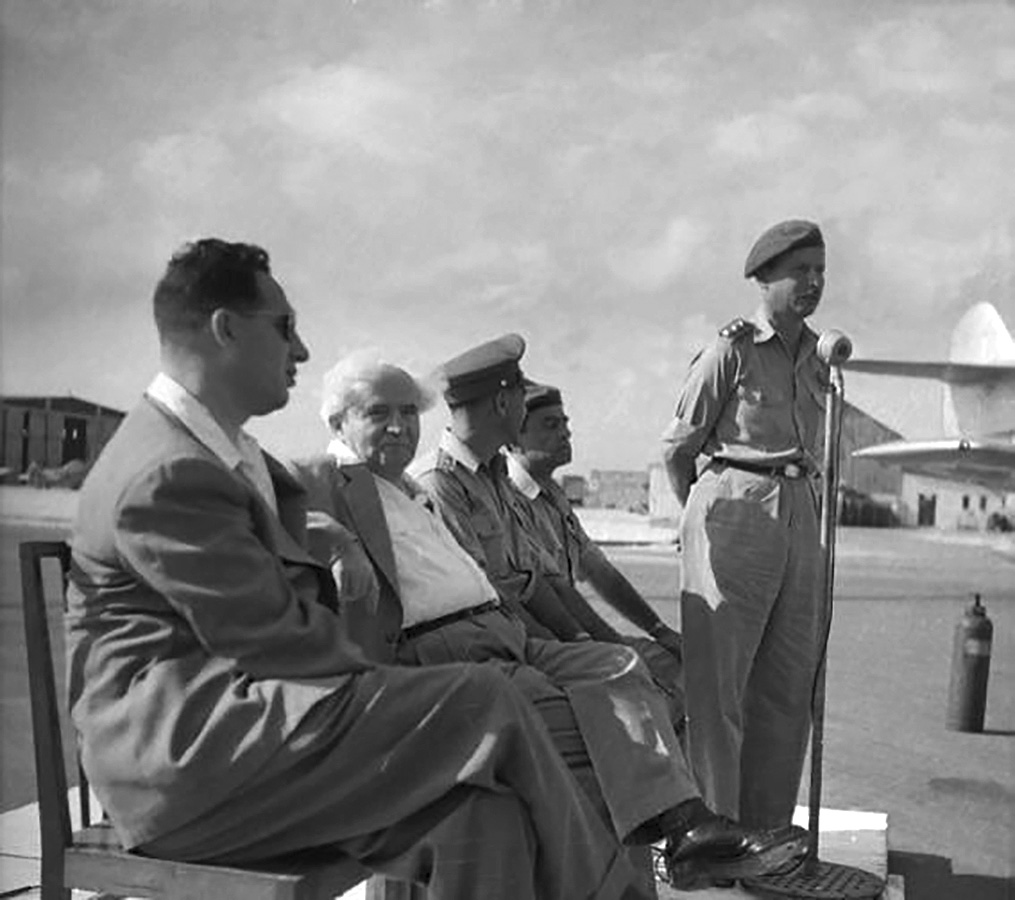
Tolkowsky (standing) and Ben-Gurion inaugurate the 117 Squadron "First Jet" at Ramat David Airbase with the first Gloster Meteor F.8 fighter jets on 17 June 1953.

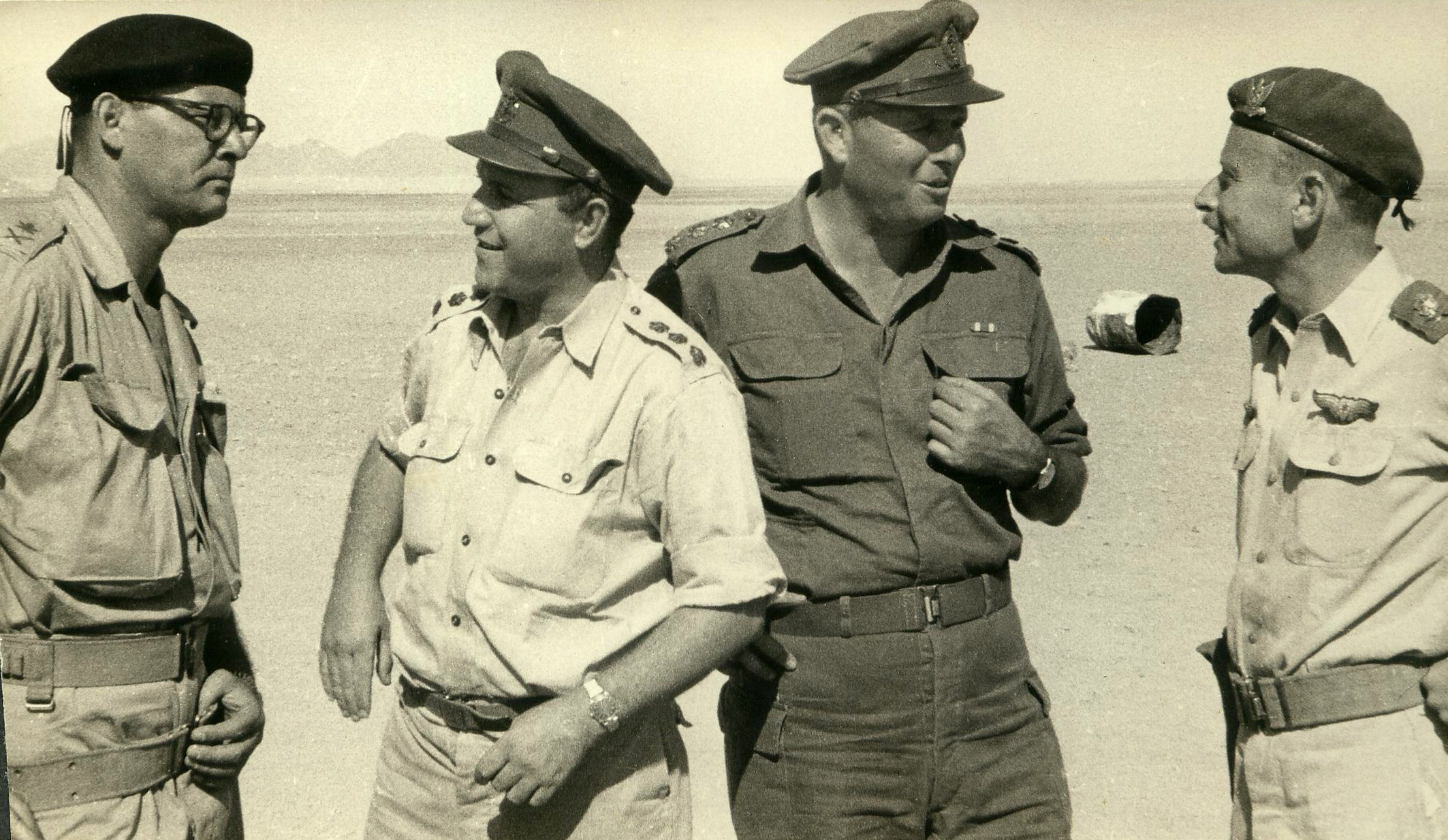
Israeli generals Haim Laskov, Moshe Kashti, Asaf Simhoni, and Tolkowsky in the Sinai Peninsula, 1956.

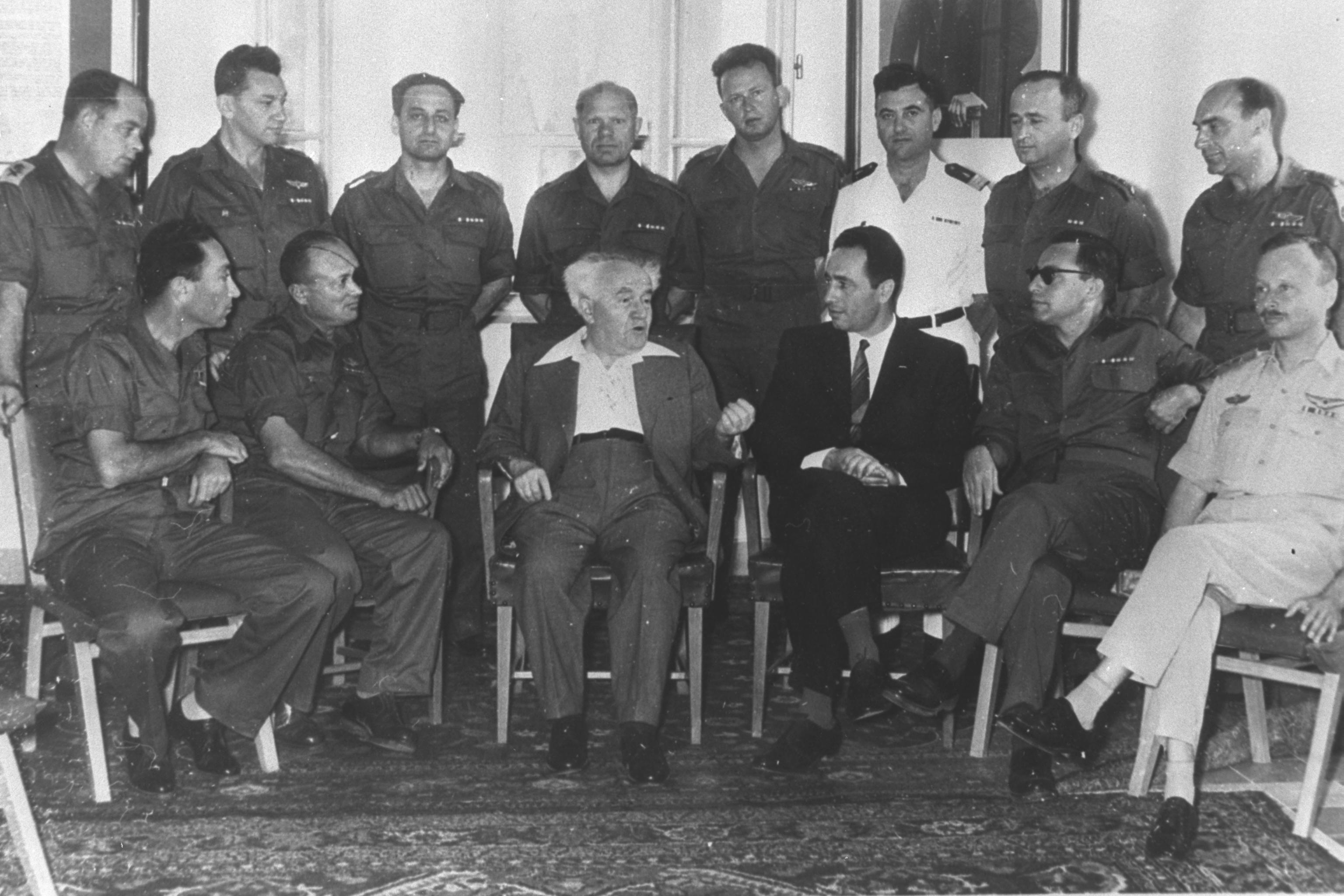
Meeting of Prime Minister David Ben-Gurion and senior Israeli officers, 1957 (Tolkowsky seated on far right).

Tolkowsky being decorated with the French Légion d'honneur, 1958

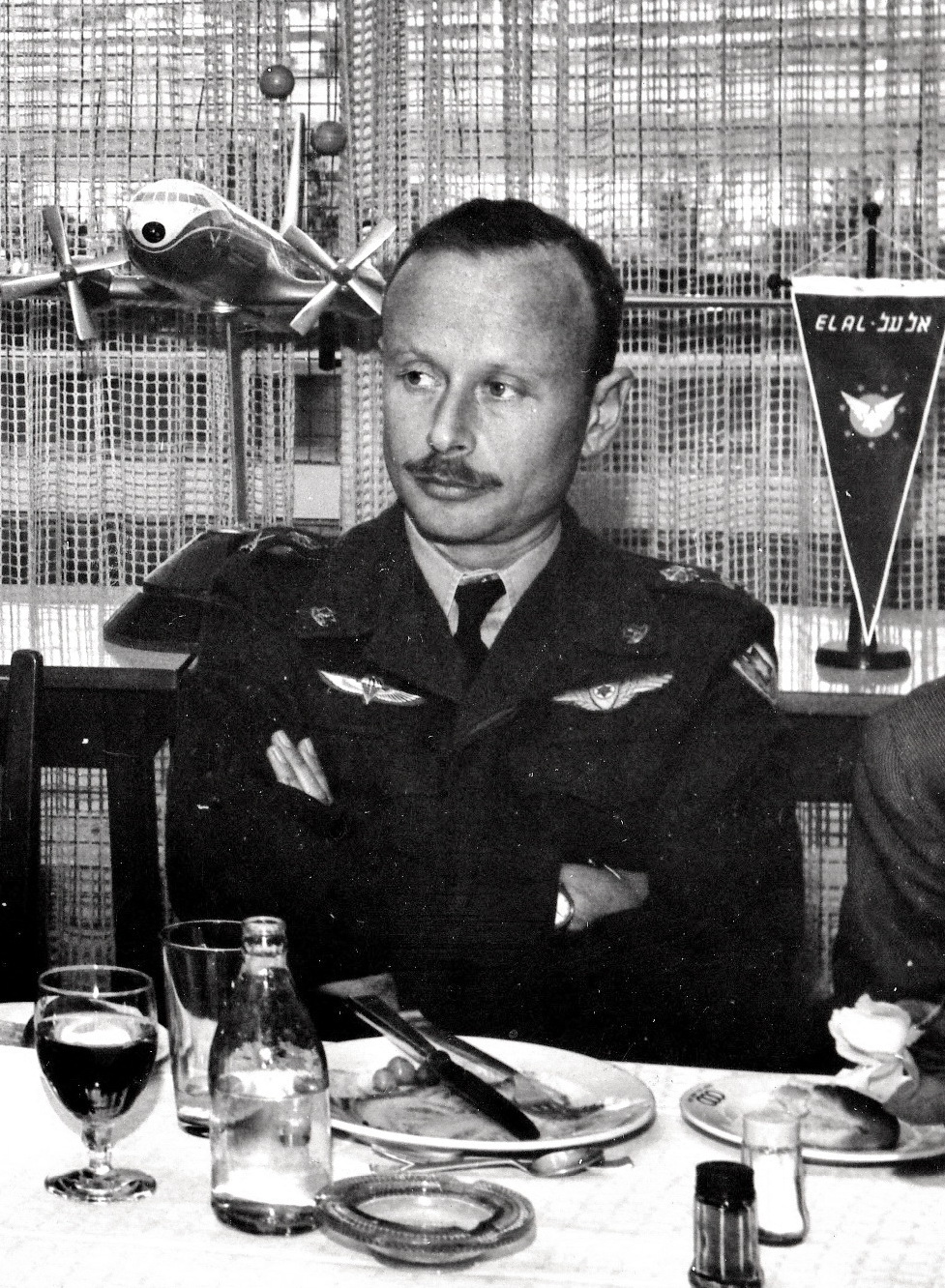
Tolkowsky at a reception ceremony for a new El Al aircraft in 1957.

Tolkowsky with First Lieutenant Yonatan Etkes, a fighter pilot recently returned from Egyptian captivity after he was shot down during the Suez Crisis, 1957.

== Civilian life ==
In 1959, Tolkowsky joined the Discount Bank Investment Corporation (DBIC), originally an arm of the Bank, later a public company in Israel. He was appointed Managing Director in 1965 and Vice-Chairman in 1980. Beginning in 1962, DBIC was the first financial institution in Israel to invest in local hi-tech industry. Tolkowsky helped Uzia Galil start the technology holding company Elron Electronic Industries in 1962 as well as the medical technology company Elscint, which became the first Israeli company to trade on Nasdaq in 1972. In 1985, Tolkowsky, in partnership with his son Gideon and Frederick Adler, a noted American venture capital investor, founded Athena, the first venture fund in Israel, to invest in Israeli and American ventures, mostly hi-tech, which operated until 1997.

Tolkowsky also held a series of minor government posts. He was a member of the National Council for Research and Development, served on the Israel Atomic Energy Commission, participated in a commission of inquiry that investigated an accident at Lod Airport, was a member of the Israel Securities Authority plenum, and headed the public council of Tel Aviv University's business administration school. In 1997, he served on the Ciechanover Commission, which investigated a failed Mossad assassination attempt against Hamas leader Khaled Mashal in Jordan.

Tolkowsky was a Commander of the French Legion of Honour (1958), held a Doctorate Honoris Causa from the Technion Israel Institute of Technology (1980), and held an award from the joint US-Israel Science and Technology Authority named after Yitzhak Rabin. He was awarded the Presidential Medal of Honor by Isaac Herzog in 2023.

Tolkowsky married his wife, Miriam, in 1948; she died in 2015. He had a daughter and two sons, Roni, David, and Gideon, as well as nine grandchildren. He died at his home in Tel Aviv, on 28 November 2025, at the age of 104.

== Sources ==
- Jews from Palestine are sent to the RAF pilot course in Rhodesia, IAF Official Site. Accessed 9 June 2006.
