= Itzhak Gerberg =

Israeli diplomat

Dr. Itzhak Gerberg (Hebrew: יצחק גרברג) serves as Ambassador of Israel to New Zealand since 2016 and Non-Resident to the Cook Islands, Samoa and Tonga. He also served as Ambassador to Georgia (2007-2012), concurrently to Mozambique, Namibia, Zambia, Botswana and Malawi (2002-2003), and Zimbabwe (1999-2002).

Gerberg has also served as Consul General in Shanghai (1996-1997) and Bombay (1992-1996) and Manila (1985-1989).

He earned a B.A. in Political Science from University of Tel-Aviv, a M.A. in Mass Communications from the Hebrew University, a master's degree in political science from Haifa University (1999) and a PhD in international politics from the University of South Africa (2009).

In 2024, Ambassador Gerberg served as a visiting professor in National Chengchi University (NCCU 政治大學), Taipei.
