= Adi Altschuler =

Israeli educator and social entrepreneur

- עדי אלטשולר
- Altschuler in 2025

Faction represented in the Knesset
- 2026–: Yashar

Personal details
- Born: 23 November 1986 (age 39) Hod HaSharon, Israel
- Awards: Israel Prize (2026)

Adi Altschuler (Hebrew: עדי אלטשולר; born 23 November 1986) is an educator, politician, social entrepreneur and member of the Knesset for Yashar. She is the founder of the "Krembo Wings" youth movement – Israel's "first movement for youths with and without special needs". She is the founder of "Memories@Home", an alternative gathering on Yom HaShoah (Holocaust Memorial day). She formerly led "Google for education, Israel" where she would advise teachers on the use of IT. With the goal of transforming Israel's education system, Adi left Google to found "Inclu-Inclusive Schools". Inclu is a nonprofit that promotes inclusive education in Israel through a network of public inclusive schools. In 2026, she received the Israel Prize for Young Leadership.

== Biography ==
Adi Altschuler was born and raised in Hod Hasharon. At the age of 12 she started volunteering at ILAN, an Israeli NGO for children with physical disabilities. During her volunteering, she became a personal tutor of the late Kobi Kfir – a three-year-old child with cerebral palsy. Through this acquaintance and friendship with Kfir, she was exposed to the world of special education.

She joined Yashar in September 2026 ahead of the 2026 Israeli legislative election and is expected to be the party's candidate for education minister if it comes to power. She was elected to the Knesset.

== Social activism ==
=== Krembo Wings ===
In 2002, at the age of 16 she joined the "Lead" (leadership development program) and inspired by the relationship with Kfir she decided to establish a youth movement in Israel – K’nafaim Shel Krembo (Krembo Wings). This is Israel's first and only movement for youth both with and without special needs, where they can work together. These children meet weekly at 66 branches with more than 5,700 children and youths nationwide. Altschuler presided as CEO and chairman until 2009 and later as president until her retirement in 2014. The movement has won numerous awards over the years, including the "Presidential Award" by Shimon Peres in 2009 and the "Yigal Allon" Award in 2010. Altschuler was chosen as one of the dozen torch-lighters for Israel's 60th anniversary national celebration at Mount Herzl.

=== Zikaron Basalon ===
Altschuler founded Zikaron Basalon – (Memories@Home) project in 2010. This initiative enables private individuals an alternative way of commemorating the Holocaust memorial day through independent meetings to the community in their own living room. In this intimate gatherings the participants are hosting Holocaust survivor's and listening to his/her stories then reconnecting to the memory of the Holocaust and examine themselves in society today through meaningful open conversations.

In 2018 more than 750,000 people participated in Zikaron Basalon events in more than 150 cities in Israel and 50 countries abroad. The project also enabled the memory of the Holocaust accessible to sectors that were traditionally excluded from participating, such as inmates, women in prostitution, youths at risk, the mentally disabled, hearing impaired and refugees' community.

=== Inclu schools ===
Inclu is a nonprofit organization founded on Oct. 2017 by Adi together with a team of educators, teachers, parents and students. Inclu's aim is to promote inclusive education in Israel's public schools. In September 2018 the Ministry of Education opened the first five inclusive schools in Israel with the collaboration of Inclu. Inclu's objective is to modify the Israeli's education system to fit the 21st century by transforming all schools to be inclusive, by personalized education and by differentiating teaching methods.

== Awards and recognition ==
- 2004 – "Tamari" recognition for excellence, quality and leadership (named after General Nehemiah Tamari)
- 2005 – "Bernstein Award" for leadership and volunteering
- 2007 – Honored citizen of her hometown, Hod Hasharon
- 2007 – Woman of the Year award by "Lions"
- 2008 – "Ernest and Young" Social Entrepreneurship Award
- 2013 – The Rapaport Prize for women generating change
- 2014 – Time – chosen as one of six leaders of the next generation
- 2016 – The Paul Harris award by World Rotary
- 2016 – Honorary Fellow of Interdisciplinary Center Herzliya, Israel
- 2017 – Honorary Fellow of the Gordon College of Education, Haifa
- 2017 – The Light Award by The Foundation for the Benefit of Holocaust Victims in Israel
- 2019 – ADL Noah Klieger Award for Commemoration of the Holocaust
- 2020 – torchbearer in the national Israeli Independence Day ceremony
- 2026 – Israel prize for Young Leadership

== See also ==
- Women of Israel
