= Jouybareh district =

Historic district in Isfahan, Iran

Coordinates: 32°40′16.87″N 51°41′33.38″E

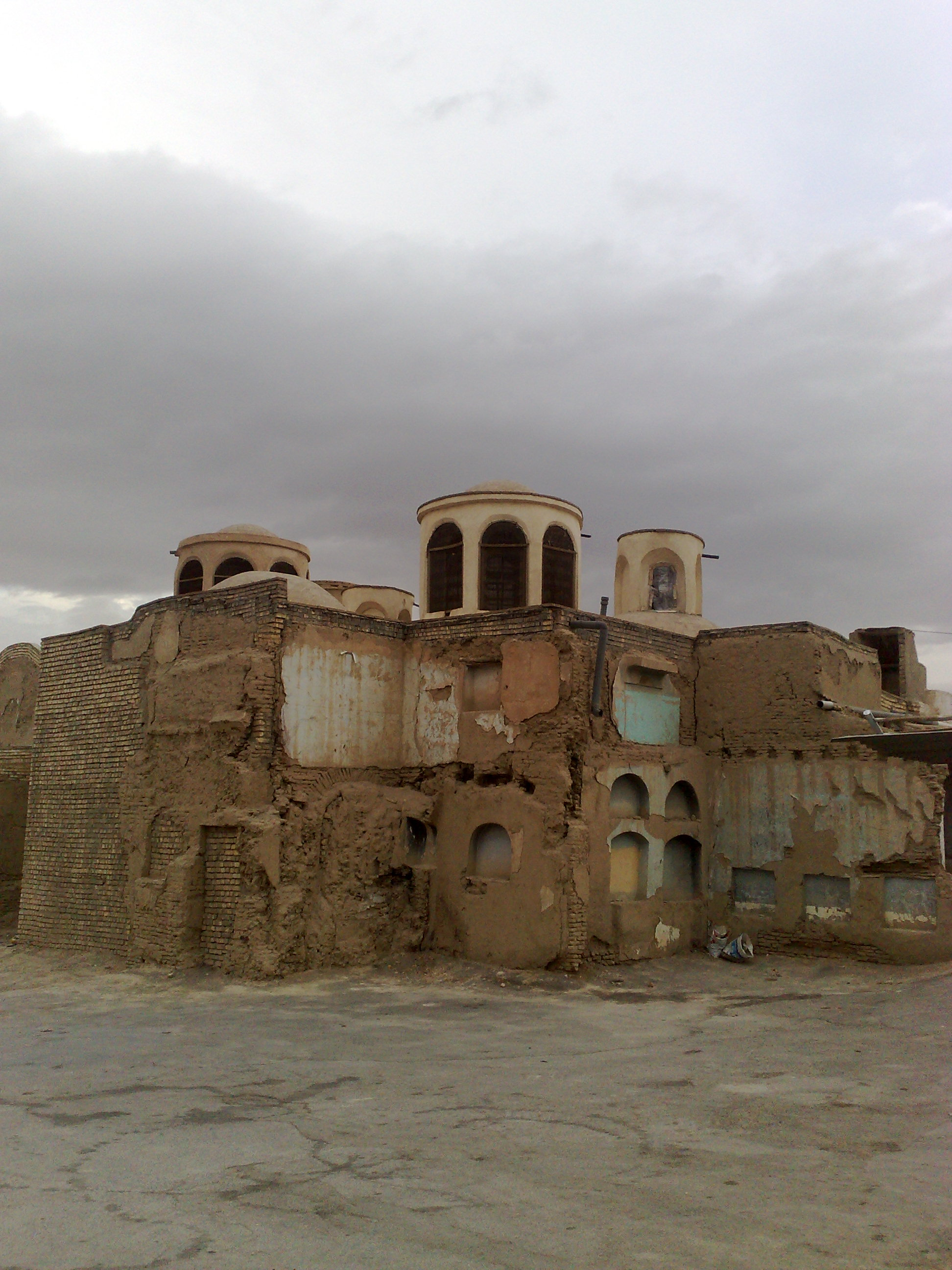
Amu Shoaya, the oldest Synagoge in Jouybareh district.

The Jouybareh district (Persian: جویباره) is the oldest district of Isfahan. The district originates in the early Achaemenid era and because of the immigration of the Babylonian Jews on the order of Cyrus the Great.

This district was called Dar ol-Johoud (Residential area of Jews) until the 12th century, but later it was known as Jahanbareh and Jouybareh and became one of the districts of Isfahan, serving as a ghetto for the Jewish residents of the city. In the Seljuk era, the district became the center of Isfahan. Furthermore, this district holds historical structures like Sarban minaret and Chehel Dokhtaran minaret, dating as far back as the 12th century.
