= Shmuel Tolkowsky =

Belgian-Israeli agronomist and diplomat

- שמואל טולקובסקי
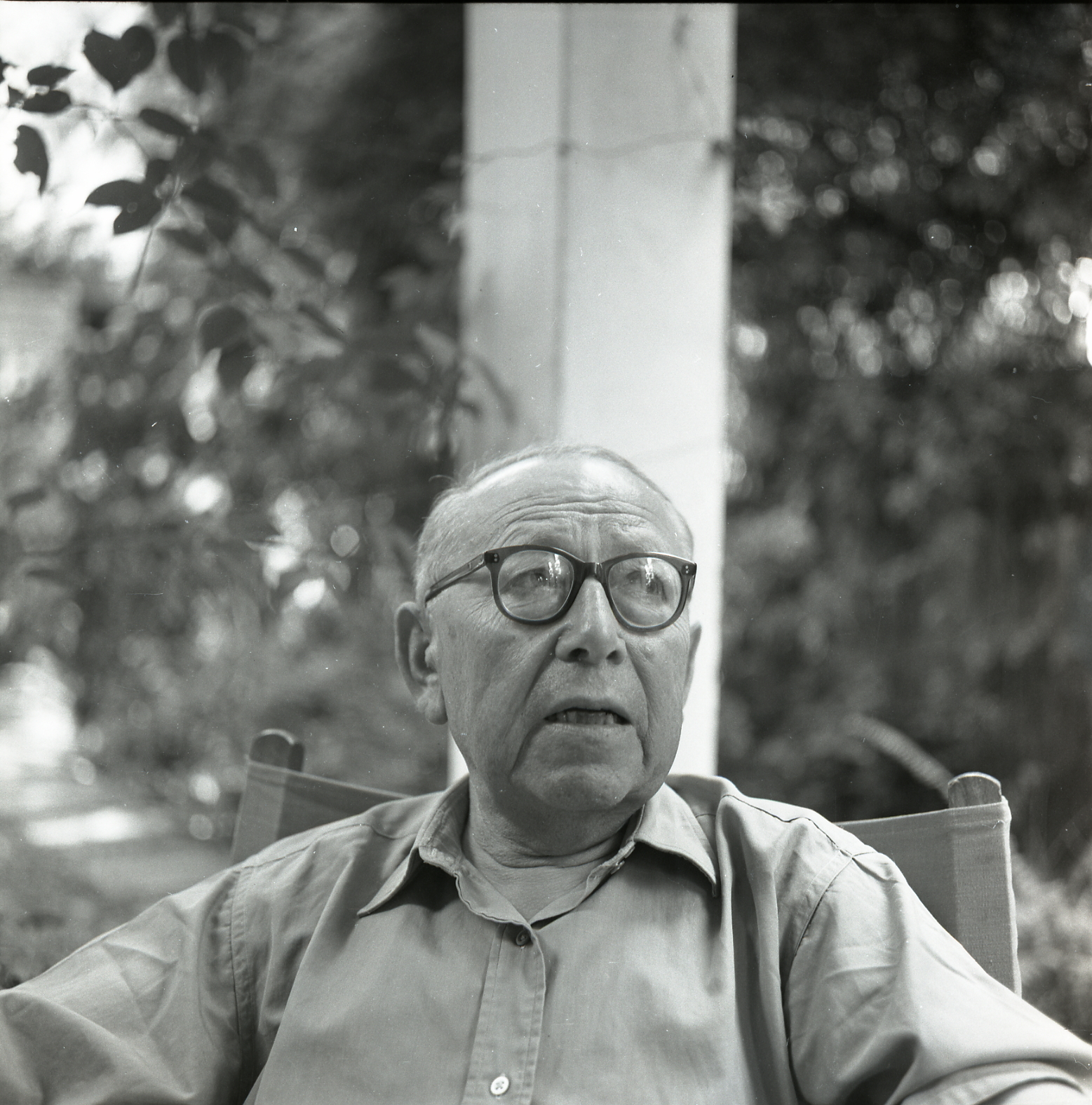
- Tolkowsky in 1962
- Born: 27 June 1886; Antwerp, Belgium
- Died: 19 December 1965 (aged 79)
- Relatives: Isaac Leib Goldberg (father-in-law); Dan Tolkowsky (son)

Shmuel Tolkowsky (Hebrew: שמואל טולקובסקי; 27 June 1886 – 19 December 1965) was a Belgian-born agronomist, Zionist and Israeli diplomat. He became the assistant to Chaim Weizmann and Nachum Sokolov, two important leaders of the Zionist Movement. Shmuel Tolkowsky himself was the son-in-law of Yitzhak Goldberg, a founder of the Jewish Foundation Fund.

He was born in Antwerp, Belgium, and moved to Ottoman Palestine in 1911. During World War I he was drafted into the Belgian Army while visiting Belgium and served until Belgium's defeat. He then found refuge in London, where he was reunited with his fiancée. Following the end of the war, he returned to now British-ruled Palestine. Two daughters, Naomi and Ada, were born in London. His son Dan Tolkowsky was born in Tel Aviv in 1921.

Tolkowsky began serving as Israeli Consul General in Switzerland in 1949 until he was promoted to Minister in 1951.

In the 1927 Birthday Honours he was appointed a Member of the Order of the British Empire (MBE) in recognition of his public services.

== Quotes ==
We Zionists look upon the fate of the Armenian people with a deep and sincere sympathy; we do so as men, as Jews, and as Zionists.

— Shmuel Tolkowsky, The Banality of Denial: Israel and the Armenian Genocide By Yair Auron, Cathy Collins Block, Michael Pressley, p. 1
