= Ifat Reshef =

Israeli diplomat

Ifat Reshef (Hebrew: יפעת רשף) is an Israeli diplomat who has been the ambassador to Switzerland and Liechtenstein since 2021.

== Early life and education ==
Reshef was born in Hadera and grew up in Netanya. She graduated from the Tel Aviv University Faculty of Law and the Hebrew University of Jerusalemfor her LL.M.

== Career ==
She started at the Ministry of Foreign Affairs (Israel) in 1993 working for the legal department and Center for Political Research. Reshef was posted in Egypt twice and was deputy ambassador in her second tour.
