= Jacob Keidar =

Israeli diplomat (ret)

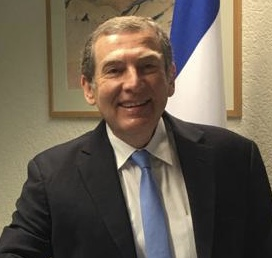
Keidar in 2021

Jacob Keidar (Hebrew: יעקב קידר; born 1956) was the Israeli Ambassador to Switzerland and Liechtenstein from 2016 to 2022. Keidar also served as Consul general in Shanghai and Ambassador to Kenya, accredited to Uganda, Seychelles, Tanzania, Malawi and Zambia (2007–2011).
