= Shalom Cohen (diplomat) =

Israeli diplomat

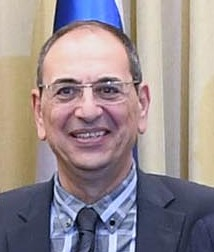
Cohen in 2017

Shalom Cohen (Hebrew: שלום כהן; born 1955) is an Israeli diplomat who served as ambassador to Egypt, a post he held from 2005 to 2010, and is now the ambassador to the South Pacific, in New Zealand. Before that, he was chairman for the Israeli mission in Tunis from 1996 to 2000, and worked at the Arab Maghreb department at the Israeli foreign ministry from 2000 to 2003.

From 2014 to 2015, Cohen was Ambassador to Kenya.

== Assassination plot ==
In July 2009, Egyptian security forces uncovered a plot by three "Al-Qaeda-linked" terrorists to assassinate the ambassador at his home and bomb the Israeli embassy building in Cairo. The three conspirators confessed during interrogation and provided details of their plans. The three claimed they had plans to carry out a "series of attacks" against police stations and government offices, as well as holy Christian and Islamic sites. The credibility of these confession have been doubted as some suspect they were extracted under torture.

Diplomatic posts
Preceded by Elle Shaked	Israeli Ambassador to Egypt; 2005 – 2009	Succeeded by Itzhak Levanon
