= Chehel Dokhtaran minaret =

Minaret in Isfahan, Iran

Chehel Dokhtaran Minaret منار چهل دختران

- Location within Iran

Religion
- Affiliation: Islam
- Province: Isfahan

Location
- Location: Jouybareh district, Isfahan, Iran
- Municipality: Isfahan
- Coordinates: 32.665°N 51.702222°E

Architecture
- Type: Minaret
- Style: Razi
- Completed: 1112
- Height (max): 40m
- Designated as NHL

Iran National Heritage List
- Official name: Chehel Dokhtaran Minaret
- Type: Minaret
- Designated: 1935
- Reference no.: 231
- Conservation organization: Cultural Heritage, Handicrafts and Tourism Organization of Iran

Chehel Dokhtaran minaret (Persian: مناره چهل دختران) is a historical minaret in Isfahan, Iran. It is located in the Jouybareh district of Isfahan. According to the kufic inscription on the minaret, it is built in 1112. It is the fifth oldest minaret in Iran, which has an inscription. There's a big window on the minaret, which faces the qibla. This feature does not exist in other minarets of Isfahan. There is a spiral staircase in the minaret, which leads to the top of it. This minaret is 40 meters high. Originally, the minaret was higher, but in the course of time its height has been decreased. The minaret towers over the city quarter and can be seen from the far distance, but it is difficult to reach it through the mazes of winding alleys and narrow streets.

== Etymology ==
Chehel Dokhtaran in Persian means 'forty girls'. The origin of its meaning is unknown. The number 'forty' in the Iranian culture is used for exaggerating. Perhaps there was once a building beside it, which pertained exclusively to women and does not exist any more. The people of the Neighborhood also call this minaret the Garland minaret. Garland was a British religious missionary, who came to Iran in the early 20th century and worked near the minaret.
