= Zikaron BaSalon =

Gatherings on Holocaust Remembrance Day

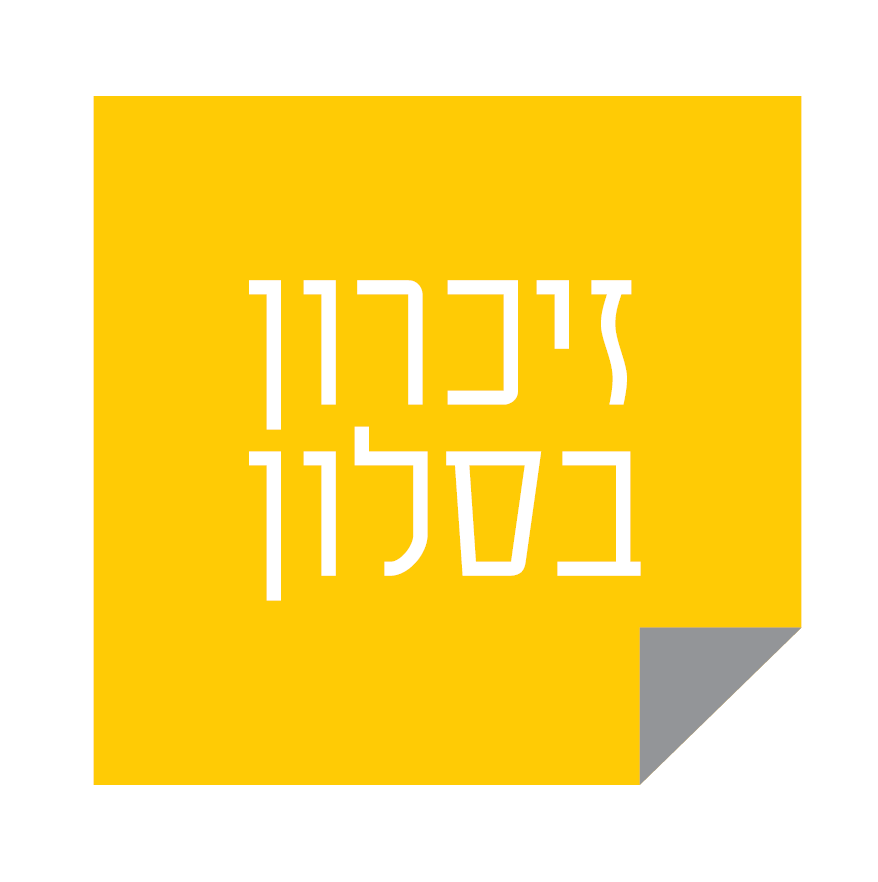
Zikaron BaSalon logo

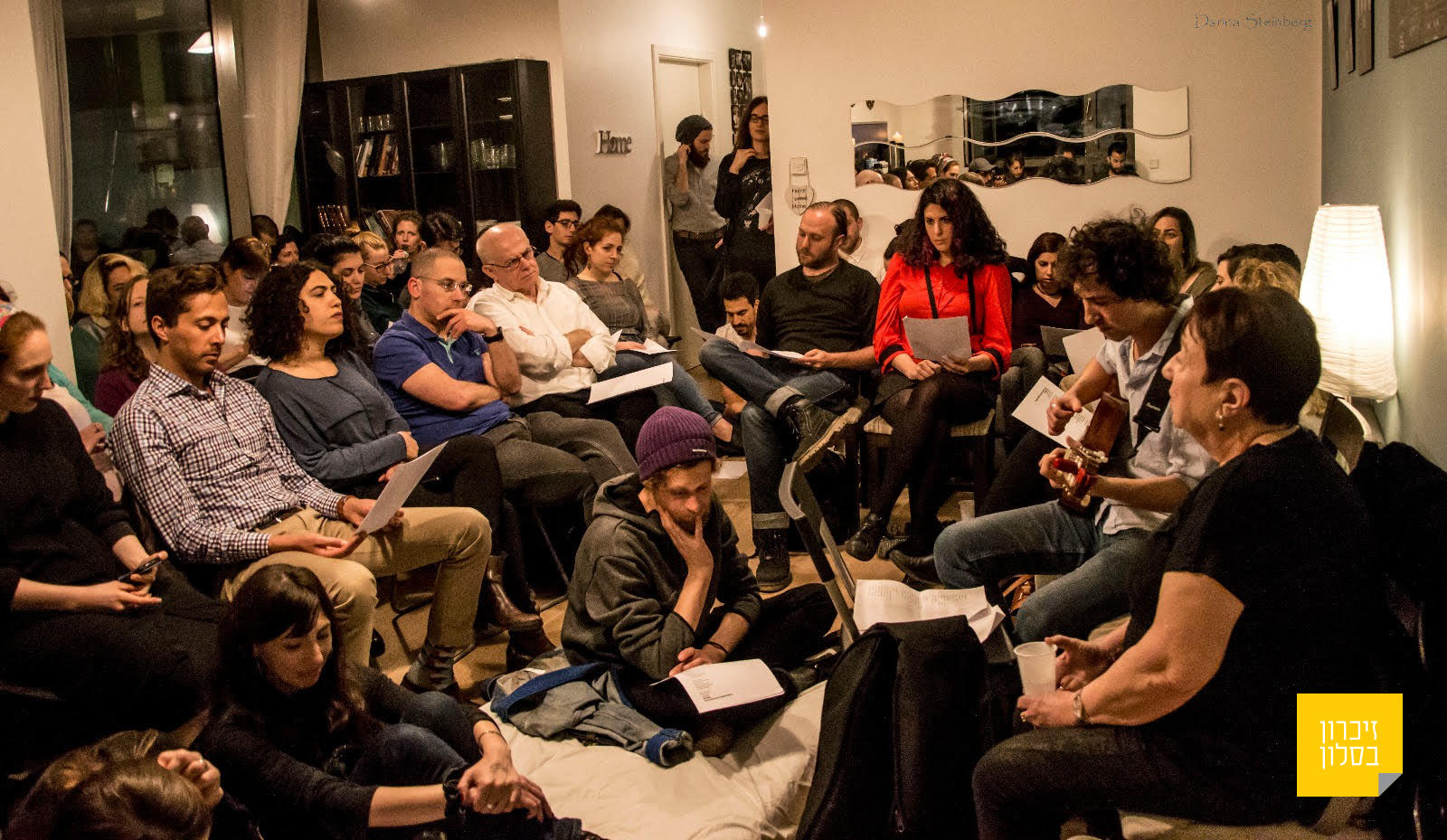
Zikaron BaSalon event

Zikaron BaSalon (Hebrew: זיכרון בסלון, lit. "A memory in the livingroom") is a social initiative of informal gatherings in private homes in Holocaust Remembrance Day, in which on the eve of Holocaust Remembrance Day, or in the days leading up to it, participants listen together to the testimonies of Holocaust survivors and descendants of Holocaust survivors, share songs, readings and thoughts and hold open discussions. Hundreds of thousands of such gatherings events are held in private salons, in Israel and abroad on that day.

The project was established by Adi Altschuler and Nadav Ambon in 2011. Since then, more than 2 million people in Israel and abroad have participated in the project. According to the organizers, "the initiative is intended for people who are looking for other ways to mark Holocaust Remembrance Day, along with state ceremonies and traditional television programs shown in that evening. It allows everyone to take back ownership and responsibility for shaping the memory of the Holocaust, to ensure that its discussion continues even after there are no survivors left among us, and to influence the way in which we remember and learn from the Holocaust."

Zikaron BaSalon is made up of three main parts: testimony of a Holocaust survivor or a second-generation descendants of Holocaust survivor, sharing and discussion.

Zikaron BaSalon volunteers provide the organizer with guidance on planning and content, and if possible connect them to someone who will come to speak and share their memories at the event.

== Awards ==
- 2018 The Foundation for the Welfare of Holocaust Victims Medal of Light. In a ceremony at the Knesset
- 2019 The Presidential Award for Volunteerism, In a ceremony at the official residence of the President of Israel in Jerusalem.
- 2019 Noah Klieger Anti-Defamation League Medal to perpetuate the memory of the Holocaust
