= 2014 in Israel =

- Decades: 1990s; 2000s; 2010s; 2020s
- See also: History of Israel; Timeline of Israeli history; List of years in Israel

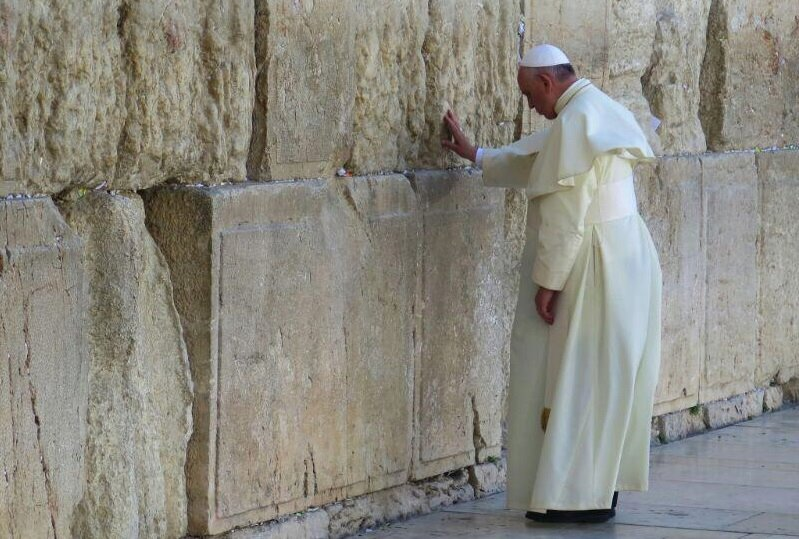
Pope Francis visits the Western Wall

Events in the year 2014 in Israel.

== Incumbents ==
- President of Israel – Shimon Peres until 27 July, Rubi Rivlin
- Prime Minister of Israel – Benjamin Netanyahu (Likud)
- Government of Israel – 33rd government of Israel
- President of the Supreme Court – Asher Grunis
- Chief of General Staff – Benny Gantz

== Events ==
=== January ===
- January 2 – Former Israeli Prime Minister Ariel Sharon goes into critical condition following renal failure after being in a coma since 2006.
- January 11 – Former Israeli Prime Minister Ariel Sharon dies at the age of 85 after spending eight years in a coma following a stroke.
- January 13 – State funeral of Ariel Sharon.
- January 20 – Revenge porn becomes illegal in Israel.
- January 26 – According to Lebanese and Syrian opposition sources, Israel carries out an airstrike in the city of Latakia. The target is allegedly S-300 missiles.

=== February ===
- February 24 – Israel allegedly carries out two airstrikes against Hezbollah facilities in Lebanon near the border with Syria.

=== March ===
- March 2 – Much of Jerusalem is paralyzed when hundreds of thousands of ultra-Orthodox Jews protest against a draft bill that would require many of them to serve in the military.
- March 5 – In Operation Full Disclosure, the Israeli military seizes the Klos C cargo vessel in the Red Sea. Israel says the weaponry found on board, including long-range rockets, was destined for militants in Gaza and had been sent by Iran.
- March 12 – Palestinian Islamic Jihad fires more than 50 rockets and mortar shells into southern Israel, the most intense barrage launched from the Gaza Strip since November 2012, after the killing of three of their militants who were about to carry out an attack near Khan Younis the day before. In response, Israel launches airstrikes on 29 targets in Gaza.
- March 18 – An Israeli jeep traveling on the Golan Heights near the Syrian border comes under attack when an explosive device is detonated in its vicinity. One soldier is seriously wounded, and another three soldiers sustain light-to-moderate injuries. The IDF returns fire across the border following the incident. Israel responds by carrying out multiple airstrikes against Syrian targets, including a military headquarters, artillery batteries and a training base of the Syrian army.

=== May ===
- May 1 – Shelly Dadon is abducted and murdered by an Israeli Arab cab driver.
- 8 May – Mei Feingold represents Israel at the Eurovision Song Contest with the song “Same Heart” reaching the semi-final round.

=== June ===
- June 12 – Three Israeli teens are kidnapped and killed and Israeli officials believe Hamas is behind the abductions. The three murdered teens are Gilad Shaer, 16 (from Talmon), Naftali Frankel, 16 (from Nof Ayalon), and Eyal Yifrah, 19 (from Elad). Frankel was a dual Israeli-American citizen.
- June 22 – An attack in the Golan Heights killed an Israeli teenager from the Arab village of Arraba. Israel responded with airstrikes against Syrian troops, killing four Syrian soldiers and wounding nine.

=== July ===
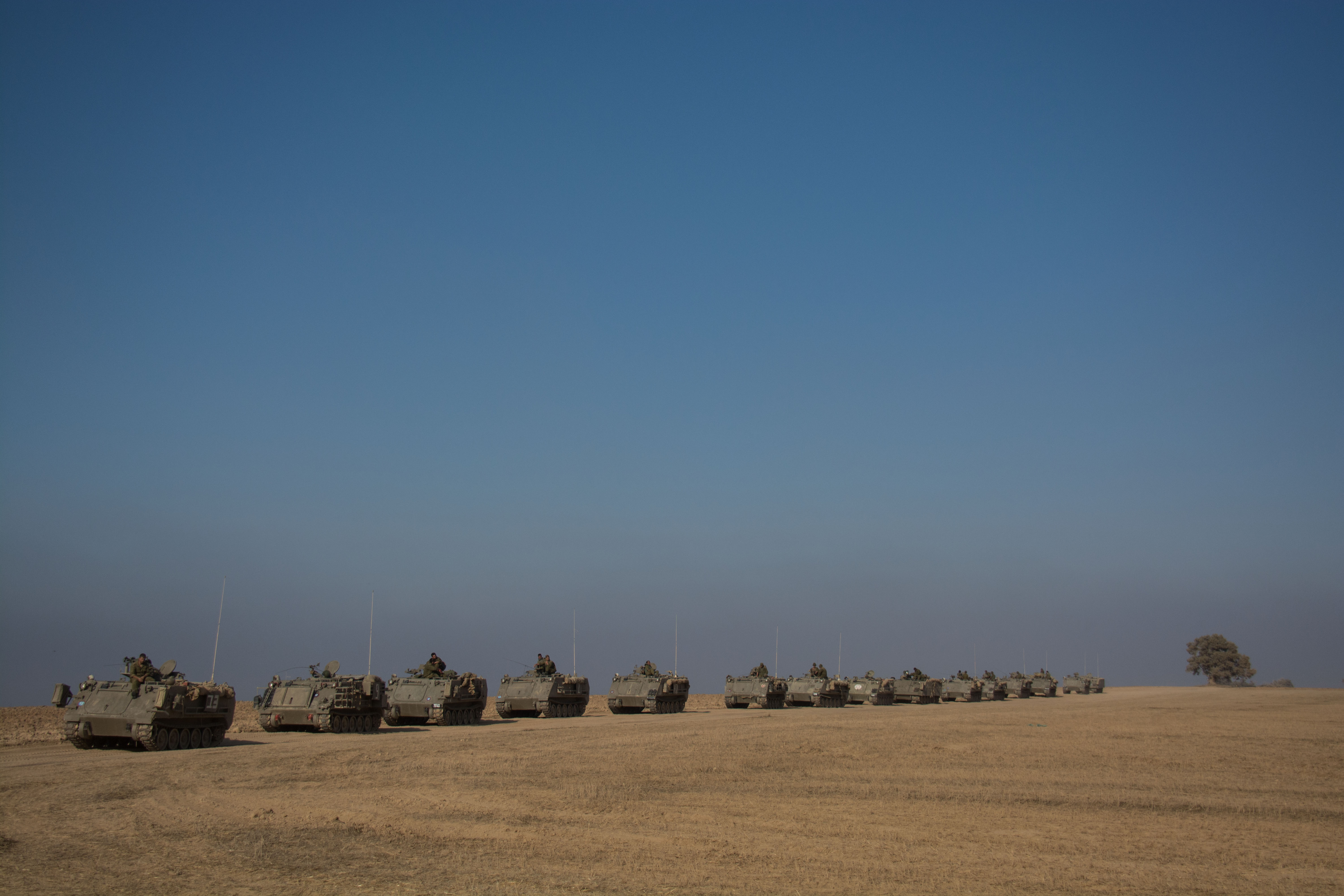
Israeli APC on their way to the Gaza border during Operation Protective Edge

- July 8 – Israel launches Operation Protective Edge, a series of airstrikes against Gazan militants, followed by a ground invasion.
- July 10–19 – Israel men's national lacrosse team competed in the 2014 World Lacrosse Championship, their first entrance into the tournament, finishing 7th
- July 29-August 2 – Israel national baseball team competed in the C-Level qualifier for the 2016 European Baseball Championship, finishing in first place

=== August ===
- August 4 – 2014 Jerusalem tractor attack
- August 31 – The IDF shot down a drone that entered Israeli-controlled airspace from the Quneitra region in Syria. Army sources said the drone likely belonged to the military of the Assad government, and strayed into Israeli airspace by accident.

=== October ===
- October 22 – First Jerusalem vehicular attack, car ramming by Arab terrorist killing an infant and a young woman.
- October 29 – Yehuda Glick, an activist for Jewish rights at the Temple Mount, was shot and wounded in an assassination attempt.

=== November ===
- November 5 – Second Jerusalem vehicular attack, a Palestinian terrorist used his car to deliberately drive into a crowd of Israelis, killing two.
- November 10
  - Killing of Sergeant Almog Shiloni, a Palestinian stabbed to death an Israeli soldier at a railroad station in Tel Aviv.
  - Alon Shvut stabbing attack, a Palestinian stabbed three Israelis at the entrance to the settlement of Alon Shvut in Gush Etzion, killing a young woman and wounding two others.
- November 18 – Jerusalem synagogue massacre, two Arabs attacked a synagogue in West Jerusalem with axes, knives, and a gun, killing four rabbis and a police officer.

=== December ===
- December 7 – It was reported that Israel carried out airstrikes near Damascus international airport and in the town of Dimas. The target was allegedly S-300 missiles which were en route to Hezbollah in Lebanon.

=== Ongoing ===
- 2014 Jerusalem unrest, (also referred as the Silent Intifada, Firecracker intifada, Jerusalem intifada, Third intifada, Silent Intifada)

== Notable deaths ==
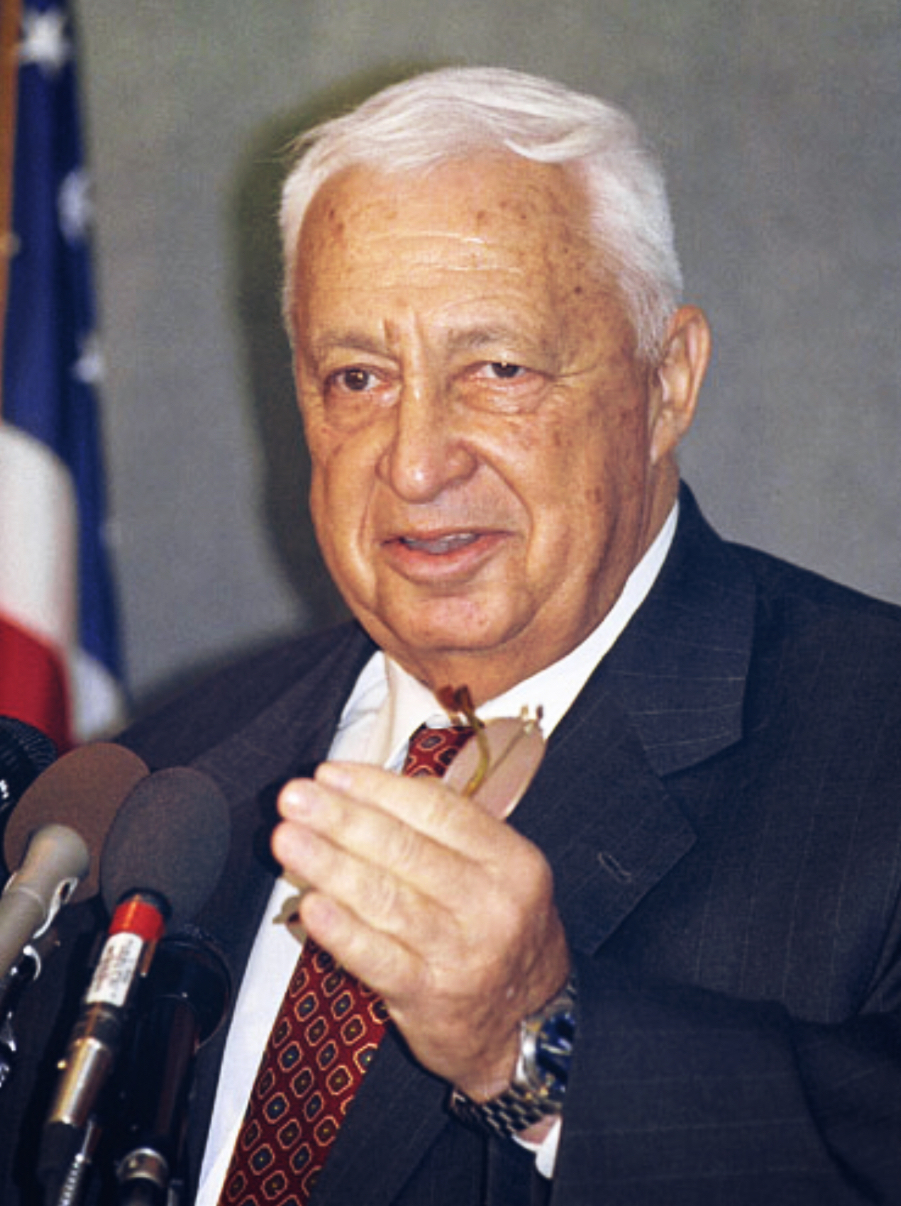
Ariel Sharon

- January 11 – Ariel Sharon, Israeli general and politician, 11th Prime Minister of Israel (born 1928)
- January 13 – Menachem Zilberman, Israeli actor, comedian, and songwriter (born 1946)
- January 19 – Azaria Alon, Israeli award-winning environmentalist (born 1918)
- January 24 – Shulamit Aloni, Israeli politician and former Minister of Education (born 1928)
- February 3 – Barry Rubin, American-born Israeli academic and columnist (born 1950)
- February 23 – Samuel Sheinbein, American-Israeli murderer (born 1980)
- March 14 – Meir Har-Zion, Israeli commando (born 1934)
- March 7 – Victor Shem-Tov, Israeli politician, former Minister of Health and Minister of Welfare (born 1915)
- April 11 – Ron Pundak, Israeli journalist and historian, architect of the Oslo Accords (born 1955)
- May 1 – Assi Dayan, Israeli filmmaker and actor, son of Moshe Dayan (born 1945)
- June 19 – Avraham Shalom, former head of the Shin Bet (born 1928)
- June 30 – The bodies of the 3 missing teenagers were found near Halhul
- July 8 – Shlomo Schmelzer, Israeli businessman (born 1947)
- July 9 – David Azrieli, Canadian-Israeli real estate tycoon, developer, designer, architect, and philanthropist (born 1922)
- August 8 – Menahem Golan, Israeli film director and producer, winner of the Israel Prize (born 1929)
- August 16 – David Glass, Israeli politician (born 1936)
- September 3 – Meni Pe'er, Israeli actor and television host (born 1946)
- October 1 – Shlomo Lahat, former mayor of Tel Aviv (born 1927)
- November 1 – Shabtai Teveth, Israeli journalist and historian (born 1925)

== See also ==
- Israel at the 2014 Winter Olympics
- List of Israeli films of 2014
- Timeline of the Israeli–Palestinian conflict in 2014
