= List of terrorist incidents in 2014 =

Terrorist incidents by country in 2014
Country	Number of incidents	Deaths	Injuries
Iraq	3,925	13,076	16,735
Pakistan	2,147	2,412	3,395
Afghanistan	1,820	5,413	5,111
Ukraine	891	1,396	1,220
Somalia	862	1,582	780
India	860	490	776
Yemen	761	1,348	1,305
Libya	730	697	893
Nigeria	713	7,773	2,283
Philippines	597	472	723
Thailand	423	192	651
Egypt	346	338	547
Syria	328	3,301	1,980
Israel	293	49	152
Colombia	230	143	314
Lebanon	204	132	532
Sudan	157	546	320
West Bank and Gaza Strip	134	67	94
Bangladesh	130	38	114
Kenya	115	315	408
Democratic Republic of the Congo	109	366	170
United Kingdom	103	0	4
Central African Republic	94	751	298
Turkey	90	38	81
Mali	68	123	221
Cameroon	67	788	18
Russia	48	67	88
Bahrain	41	9	39
South Sudan	39	908	601
China	37	322	478
Indonesia	33	19	30
Ireland	33	0	1
United States	26	19	6
Greece	26	0	4
Tunisia	23	43	64
Mozambique	22	22	60
South Africa	20	9	8
Chile	17	1	26
Sri Lanka	16	3	65
Paraguay	15	6	2
France	14	1	15
Saudi Arabia	14	20	23
Algeria	13	37	30
Germany	13	0	0
Malaysia	12	1	4
Peru	12	4	12
Tanzania	11	4	43
Iran	10	13	6
Myanmar	10	15	35
Maldives	9	0	0
Australia	8	4	7
Nepal	7	0	7
Italy	7	0	3
Uganda	6	98	16
Sweden	5	0	1
Cyprus	5	0	0
Burundi	5	4	1
Niger	5	11	9
Mexico	5	1	2
Czech Republic	5	1	1
Japan	5	0	0
Venezuela	4	1	1
Kosovo	4	2	3
Jordan	3	1	7
Azerbaijan	3	0	1
Spain	3	0	0
Bosnia and Herzegovina	3	0	4
Brazil	3	2	0
Macedonia	3	0	5
Canada	3	7	6
Rwanda	2	1	16
Kyrgyzstan	2	1	1
Senegal	2	7	3
Nicaragua	2	5	28
Albania	2	1	2
United Arab Emirates	2	1	0
Belgium	2	4	3
Ethiopia	2	9	6
Georgia	2	0	1
Dominican Republic	1	0	35
Djibouti	1	5	15
Jamaica	1	0	1
Liberia	1	0	0
Honduras	1	0	1
Hungary	1	0	0
Ghana	1	0	3
New Zealand	1	0	0
Iceland	1	0	0
Malta	1	0	0
Bhutan	1	0	0
Bulgaria	1	0	0
Netherlands	1	0	0
Tajikistan	1	1	2
Madagascar	1	1	31
Turkmenistan	1	3	2
Chad	1	6	0
Ivory Coast	1	4	0
Zimbabwe	1	0	0
Total	16,840	43,550	40,989

This is a list of terrorist incidents which took place in 2014, including attacks by violent non-state actors for political motives. Note that terrorism related to drug wars and cartel violence is not included in these lists. Ongoing military conflicts are listed separately.

== List guidelines ==
- To be included, entries must be notable (have a stand-alone article) and described by a consensus of reliable sources as "terrorism".
- List entries must comply with the guidelines outlined in the manual of style under MOS:TERRORIST.
- Casualty figures in this list are the total casualties of the incident, including immediate casualties and later casualties (such as people who succumbed to their wounds long after the attacks occurred).
- The casualties listed are the victims, perpetrator casualties are listed separately (e.g. (+1 perpetrator) indicate that along with the victims of the attack, one perpetrator was also killed/injured).
- Casualty totals may be underestimated or unavailable due to a lack of information. A figure with a plus (+) sign indicates that at least that many people have died (e.g. 10+ indicates that at least 10 people have died) – the actual toll could be considerably higher.
- If casualty figures are 20 or more, they will be shown in **bold**. In addition, figures for casualties more than 50 will also be **underlined**.

== List ==
Date	Type	Dead	Injured	Location	Article	Details	Perpetrator	Part of
Jan 15	Car bombings	40	88	Baghdad, Iraq	January 15, 2014 Baghdad bombings	Six car bombs targeting open-stall markets and commercial areas exploded.	Unknown	Iraqi Civil War
Jan 19	Bombing	20	24	Bannu, Pakistan	2014 Bannu bombing	An explosion targeted a military convoy as it began to leave Bannu going to Razmak. 20 soldiers were killed.	Tehrik-i-Taliban Pakistan	War in North-West Pakistan
Jan 24	Truck bombing, other explosions	6	100	Cairo, Egypt	January 2014 Cairo bombings	A truck bomb exploded next to Police Headquarters, killing four people and damaging the police building and the Islamic Museum severely. Three more explosions occurred targeting police stations or vehicles, killing an additional two people.	Ansar Beit al-Maqdis	Sinai insurgency
Jan 26	Massacre	85	50	Kawuri, Borno State, Nigeria	Kawuri massacre	An attack occurred some 37 kilometers southeast of Maiduguri.	Unknown	Boko Haram insurgency
Mar 1	Knife assault on train station	28	113	Kunming, China	2014 Kunming attack	A terrorist squad of suspected Uyghur separatists attacked the city's largest metro train station with knives, stabbing civilians waiting for trains or disembarking from trains. Police arrived and shot dead five attackers and arrested three other suspects the next day. It was the worst separatist terrorist attack in China.	East Turkestan Islamic Movement (suspected)	Xinjiang conflict
Mar 18	Suicide car bombing	27+	Unknown	Buloburde, Somalia	2014 Hotel Amalo attack	Car loaded with explosives detonated outside the Hotel Amalo. The hotel was used by African and Somali troops who had taken the city from Al-Shabaab a week earlier. The suicide bomber was identified as an emigrant to Norway.	Burhan Ahmed Abdule	Somali Civil War
Mar 20	Gun attack	9 (+4 attackers)	2	Kabul, Afghanistan	2014 Kabul Serena Hotel attack	Gunmen stormed the Kabul Serena Hotel, frequented by foreign nationals. In the ensuing gun battle with security forces, four attackers were killed. Among the dead was an Agence France-Presse reporter, his family, and two Canadian citizens.	Taliban	War in Afghanistan
Apr 14	Bombing	71	124	Abuja, Nigeria	April 2014 Nyanya bombing	Two bombs detonated at a bus station.	Boko Haram (Suspected)	Boko Haram insurgency
Apr 14	Kidnapping	Unknown	Unknown	Chibok, Nigeria	Chibok schoolgirls kidnapping	Approximately 276 female students were kidnapped from a school.	Boko Haram	
May 1	Bombing	>19	>60	New Nyanya, Nigeria	May 2014 Nyanya bombing	A car bomb exploded in a suburb of Abuja.	Boko Haram	Boko Haram insurgency
May 1–3	Attack	32 (+3 suspects)	n/a	Baksa and Kokrajhar, Assam, India	May 2014 Assam violence	On May 1, Insurgents on bicycles raided the Narsingbari village of Baksa district opening fire on a house, killing three women and injuring two others. On 2 May, another group of insurgents opened fire at three houses in Balapara village of Kokrajhar district, killing seven people. On the evening of the same day, another group killed 12 people and burnt down 30 thatched houses near Baksa's Manas National Park. On 3 May, four insurgents attacked police in the forest near Tejpur. Police fired in retaliation, killing two, while two others escaped. Police also killed one more suspect in Udalguri district.	National Democratic Front of Bodoland	
May 22	Bombing	31	>90	Ürümqi, China	May 2014 Ürümqi attack	Attackers crashed two vehicles into a shoppers market. The assailants also threw explosives.	East Turkestan Islamic Movement	Xinjiang conflict
May 23	Stabbing, shooting, vehicle ramming	7 (+1 attacker)	14	Santa Barbara, California, United States	2014 Isla Vista killings	A 22-year-old man fatally stabbed his two roommates and their friend in their apartment before launching a rampage in Isla Vista, California, during which he opened fire and struck others with his car, claiming the lives of three more people. He then shot himself in the head.	Elliot Rodger	Misogynist terrorism
May 24	Shooting	4	0	Brussels, Belgium	Jewish Museum of Belgium shooting	A man opened fire in the Jewish Museum. On May 30, a former volunteer fighter for Islamist rebels in the Syrian Civil War was arrested at a bus station in Marseille.	Mehdi Nemmouche	Islamic Terrorism in Europe
Jun 4	Shooting	3	2	Moncton, Canada	2014 Moncton shootings	An assailant opened fire on Royal Canadian Mounted Police constables. Three constables were killed and two others were wounded. The attacker stated that the attack was carried out in order to urge others to fight against military personnel, who protect government institutions, as well as the rich.	Justin Bourque	Terrorism in Canada
Jun 8	Shooting	3 (+2 terrorists)	0	Las Vegas, Nevada, United States	2014 Las Vegas shootings	Two lone wolf attackers killed two police officers as they were eating lunch, then went to a nearby Walmart and killed a shopper before both killing themselves.	Lone wolf Sovereign Citizen Movement	
Jun 10	Massacre	670		Badush, Iraq	Badush prison massacre	Attack on a prison.	Islamic State	Iraqi Civil War
Jun 12	Massacre	1,095-1,700		Tikrit, Iraq	Camp Speicher massacre	ISIS militants massacre at least 1,000 unarmed Iraqi cadets.	Islamic State	Northern Iraq offensive
Jun 15	Attack	48–59	n/a	Mpeketoni, Kenya	Mpeketoni attacks	Gunmen entered the town and took people hostage.	Al-Shabaab	
Aug 4	Vehicular assault	1 (+1 terrorist)	6	Jerusalem, Israel	2014 Jerusalem tractor attack	A Palestinian attacker rammed the front end of a massive construction excavator into an Israeli bus, overturning the vehicle and killing a pedestrian before he was shot and killed by a police officer.	Palestinian assailant	Israeli–Palestinian conflict
Sep 23	Melee attack	attacker	2	Melbourne, Victoria, Australia	2014 Endeavour Hills stabbings	An 18-year-old stabbed two counter-terrorism officers in Endeavour Hills, a suburb of Melbourne. He was then shot dead.	Numan Haider (Numan Haider )	Terrorism in Australia
Oct 20	Vehicular assault	1 (+1 attacker)	1	Saint-Jean-sur-Richelieu, Quebec, Canada	2014 Saint-Jean-sur-Richelieu ramming attack	A radicalized Islamic convert attacked 2 soldiers with his car, killing Warrant Officer Patrice Vincent. Couture-Rouleau died after being shot by the police.	Martin Couture-Rouleau	
Oct 22	Shooting	1 (+1 attacker)	3	Ottawa, Ontario, Canada	2014 shootings at Parliament Hill, Ottawa	An Islamic convert attacked the National War Memorial with a rifle, killing military reservist Cpl. Nathan Cirillo. The attacker then ran into Parliament Hill and was shot and killed by House of Commons sergeants-at-arms, and the RCMP. Event found unrelated to prior terrorist attack	Michael Zehaf-Bibeau (lone wolf)	
Oct 22	Vehicular assault	2 (+1 attacker)	7	East Jerusalem	October 2014 Jerusalem vehicular attack	A driver rammed his vehicle into a group of people waiting on the platform for the Jerusalem Light Rail, killing a three-month-old female infant. Four days later an Ecuadorean tourist died from her injuries.	Hamas operative	Israeli–Palestinian conflict
Oct 23	Melee attack	1 (attacker)	3	Queens, New York	2014 NYC hatchet attack	A radicalized Islamic convert charged at four NYPD officers with a hatchet. He injured two of them, and was shot and killed by the other two. A bystander was shot by police.	Zale F. Thompson	
Nov 5	Vehicular assault	3 (+1 attacker)	14	Jerusalem, Israel	November 2014 Jerusalem vehicular attack	A Palestinian plowed his vehicle into a crowd of people at a light rail station.	Ibrahim al-Akri (lone wolf)	Israeli–Palestinian conflict
Nov 10	Melee assault	1	0	Tel Aviv, Israel	Killing of Sergeant Almog Shiloni	An IDF soldier died after being stabbed multiple times in an attack at Hahagana train station.	Lone wolf	Israeli–Palestinian conflict
Nov 11	Melee attack	1 (+1 perpetrator	2	Alon Shvut, West Bank	2014 Alon Shvut stabbing attack	A Palestinian tried to run people over with his car at a bus stop and hit a concrete barrier. He then jumped out of the car and stabbed a woman and two men who were standing there. The woman died and the men were injured.	Maher al-Hashlamun lone wolf)	
Nov 18	Shooting, Melee attack	6 (+2 attackers)	6	Jerusalem, Israel	2014 Jerusalem synagogue attack	Two activists entered a synagogue with knives, axes and at least one gun. The terrorists opened fire and began swinging their axes indiscriminately. Police nearby rushed in and killed them. Four worshippers were killed and at least eight wounded, one seriously. He later succumbed to his injuries.	Popular Front for the Liberation of Palestine	Israeli–Palestinian conflict
Nov 23	Suicide bombing	61		Yahyakhel District, Afghanistan	2014 Yahyakhel suicide bombing	Suicide bomber detonated his explosives at a volleyball match. Many children were among the dead and wounded.	Haqqani network	War in Afghanistan
Dec 13	Kidnapping	32	185 kidnapped	Gumsuri, Borno State, Nigeria	2014 Gumsuri kidnappings		Boko Haram	Boko Haram insurgency
Dec 15	Shooting, Hostage taking	2 (+1 attacker)	4	Sydney, New South Wales, Australia	2014 Sydney hostage crisis	An Iranian-Australian self-proclaimed sheikh and ISIS sympathizer took 17 people hostage inside the Lindt Chocolat Cafe at Martin Place for 16 hours before a shootout with police, resulting in the death of 2 hostages.	Mon Haron Monis	
Dec 16	Suicide Bombing	25+		Rada' District, Yemen	2014 Rada' bombings	Attacks on Houthi militants with two bombs. The first struck a gathering point where a group of Houthis were located; the second did not make it far enough and blew up next to a bus carrying children from school.	AQAP	Houthi insurgency in Yemen
Dec 16	Suicide bombing, Mass shooting,	144	114	Peshawar, Pakistan	2014 Peshawar school massacre	Seven gunmen dressed in military uniforms scaled the walls to the Army Public School opening fire on students and teachers and planting bombs in classrooms. 132 children were among the dead.	Tehrik-i-Taliban Pakistan	War in North-West Pakistan
Dec 22	Bombing	27	60	Gombe, Gombe State, Nigeria	2014 Gombe bus station bombing	A bomb exploded in a bus station.	Unknown	
Dec 28–29	Shooting	84	3	Mozogo district, Far North Region, Cameroon	December 2014 Cameroon clashes	Militants burned down a village.	Boko Haram (suspected)	Boko Haram insurgency

Total Incidents: 36
