= Timeline of the Israeli–Palestinian conflict in 2014 =

This is a list of individual incidents and statistical breakdowns of incidents of violence between Israel and Palestinian dissident factions in 2014 as part of the Israeli–Palestinian conflict.

== Overview ==
2,314 Palestinians were killed and 17,125 injured by Israeli operations in 2014, a rise from 39 deaths and 3,964 injuries caused in the previous year, according to UN Office for the Coordination of Humanitarian Affairs. Over the same period 87 Israelis were killed, and 2,629 injured. The majority of casualties occurred during the Gaza War, but 58 Palestinians were killed and 6,028 injured in the West Bank, the highest figure since 2007. Palestinian attacks on Israeli civilians, mostly settlers, and security forces resulted in 12 fatalities, compared to 4 the previous year. In 2014, the Israeli military administration in the West Bank demolished 493 structures and homes of 969 Palestinians; 97 buildings in East Jerusalem; the homes of 208 Palestinians in East Jerusalem; and an average of 9 Palestinian buildings per week.

According to the United States Human Rights Report for the year, the most significant human rights abuses across the occupied territories by multiple actors consisted of excessive use of force against civilians, including killings; arbitrary arrest and associated torture and abuse, often with impunity.' The Report states also that Palestinian detainees suffered abuses, particularly during arrest and interrogation, properties were confiscated or demolished, and limitations were placed on freedom of expression, assembly, and association. In addition, severe restrictions were imposed on Palestinians' internal and external freedom of movement.

== January 2014 ==
In January 2014, six Palestinians (two in Gaza; four in the West Bank), five of whom were civilians, were killed by Israeli forces. 219 Palestinians, of whom 216 were civilians and 43 children, suffered injuries (41 in Gaza, 178 in the West Bank). Throughout the same period, there were no Israeli fatalities, and nine people, of whom eight civilians, were injured. Two civilians, of whom was a 16-year-old boy, were shot dead by Israeli forces allegedly without warning for being too close to the border perimeter. 22 Palestinian civilians were injured (16 by live fire) in demonstrations, in which stones were thrown, east of Jabaliya. The protests were related to Israeli restrictions on access to land.

There were 29 attacks by Israeli settlers on Palestinians in their occupied territories, resulting in eight Palestinians injured, and nearly 1,000 trees and eighteen vehicles vandalized. Settler violence from Yitzhar, Bracha, and Shilo outposts in the Nablus Governorate were particularly notable.

Seven clashes between school children and IDF forces deployed near Palestinian schools, involving stone-throwing near school entrances led to military responses using tear gas, rubber-coated metal bullets, and child arrests were registered for early January, especially near the Al Khadr school in Bethlehem. 106 Palestinian buildings were demolished by Israeli forces in the West Bank, and 183 Palestinians suffered displacement. During 434 search operations on the West Bank, 491 Palestinians were detained. On 31 January airstrikes, mostly in Beit Lahiya, killed approximately 1,200 heads of livestock on farms in the Gaza, including 150 cattle, 400 rabbits, 600 pigeons and 60 hens, while damaging five homes, two schools, and educational centre and an office.

- On 3 January 2014, the IDF shot Adnan Jamil Shehdeh Abu Khater (16) of Jabaliya, claiming he was trying to sabotage the border fence. He died later that day. B'Tselem stated that Abu Khater had not participated in hostilities.
- On 22 January 2014, two Gazans were killed in an airstrike: Muhammad Yusef Ahmad a-Z'anin (23) of Beit Hanoun, a non-belligerent, was killed. Ahmad a-Z'anin (21), a member of the military wing of the Popular Front for the Liberation of Palestine was the target assassinated by missile fire from the IAF. Both were sitting outside the latter's house when killed.
- On 24 January 2014, Bilal Samir Ahmad Aweidah (19) of Beit Lahiya, a non-belligerent, was shot dead in the chest by the IDF in a-Sayfa, after walking within several metres of the border fence with friends.
- On 29 January 2014, Muhammad Mahmoud Mubarak (20) of al-Jalazon Refugee Camp was shot dead by the IDF near Ein Siniya. Israeli reports say he opened fire at a military tower near the Israeli settlement of Ofra. According to Palestinian eyewitnesses, he was a labourer on a USAID project repaving the main road in Ein Siniya, and had earlier directed traffic. Soldiers arrived, forced him to undress, then dress again, ordered him to march, and then shot him and blocked the arrival of medics and an ambulance to succor him.

== February 2014 ==
Three Palestinian civilians (two in Gaza; one in the West Bank) were shot dead by Israeli forces, while 221, of whom 219 were civilians and 53 children, were injured (40 in Gaza and 181 in the West Bank). In the same period, no Israelis were killed, and six were injured, of whom five were civilians. Twenty three incidents settler-related incidents, dix involving injuries to a person, and seventeen resulting in damage to Palestinian properties were registered. Three settlers were injured, and one settlement was damaged. Over January and February, the Israeli Air Force, conducted 23 airstrikes on the Gaza Strip, mostly on military sites over Gaza City, Beit Hanoun and Beit Lahia, in response to mortar and rocket fire. This was one more than the total number of such strikes throughout 2013. Three of these involved targeted killing airstrikes, killing one alleged militant and injuring two, with one civilian bystander killed in collateral damage, and three civilians, including an eleven-year-old boy. Through January to February, five civilians were killed and 79 injured by IDF operations in the Gaza Strip, including four children and three suffered injuries related to airstrikes. The Israeli government demolished 17 Palestinian dwellings, of which nine in Jerusalem. 236 IDF searches were conducted in the West Bank, and 295 Palestinians were detained.

- On 13 February 2014, Ibrahim Salman Muhammad Mansur (35) of Gaza City, a non-belligerent, was shot dead with a bullet to the head from an Israeli military tower while collecting gravel from 100 to several hundred meters from the Gaza-Israel border fence. Israeli sources claim he was tampering with the fence. Another Palestinian was wounded in the incident. Survivors say no warning was given.
- On 27 February 2014, Mu'taz Abd a-Rahim Ahmad Washahah (26) of Bir Zeit was machine-gunned to death (45 bullets) at close range at his home when he refused to be arrested by Israeli security forces, on suspicion that he was a terrorist. Palestinians stated that Washahah had earlier fired shots at a bridge between Bir Zeit and an illegal Israeli settlement rumoured to have surveillance cameras, but had not targeted anyone. The family house was shelled, and he was killed when Israeli forces stormed it. Locals report his two brothers were arrested after having their hands tied behind their backs and their legs and arms broken with rocks. The soldiers responded with tear gas and bullets, both rubber and live. During the operation, a man trying to extinguish a fire in his car when the IDF threw a sound-bomb into it was shot with a rubber bullet, a camera was shot out of a Bir Zeit University student's hand as she took photos of the scene, causing nerve damage to her fingers, and an 18-year-old boy, Majid al Hamouri was shot in the leg.
- On 28 February 2014, Amneh Atiyyah Mahmoud Qdeih (58) of Khuza'a, a mentally disturbed woman was shot from an Israeli military tower while she was in the vicinity of the Gaza border. She had reportedly lost her way after a wedding ceremony nearby. She was found by relatives the day after, and taken to hospital, where she died on 1 March.

== March 2014 ==
Eleven Palestinians (including seven civilians) were killed and 236 (seventeen in Gaza, 219 in the West Bank), of whom 234 were civilians, and 68 children, were wounded, in clashes with Israeli forces in March 2014. There were no Israeli fatalities; five soldiers were injured. Nine Palestinians were injured in settler attacks, 24 Palestinian properties were damaged, as opposed to one incident where settler property was damaged. Another eleven Gaza residents were injured by the explosion of military ordnance. New settlement activities on land claimed as Palestinian private property took place this month in the northern Jordan Valley. Fifteen dunams of private Palestinian land, declared for Israeli military use in the 1990s and lying next to the Ro'i settlement; an Israeli settler began to farm fifty dunams of Palestinian land he fenced off in Khan al-Ahmar east of Jerusalem, between the settlements of Ma'ale Adumim, Kfar Adumim and Anatot.

In the first quarter of 2014, sixteen clashes, involving Israel search and arrest operations and forced entry into schools, resulting in injuries from tear gas and damage to school property were registered by UNICEF.

- On 3 March 2014, Sharif Yusef Ahmad Naser (21) and Mus'ab Musa Saber a-Z'anin (21) both of Beit Hanoun were killed when an IAF missile hit them as they were attempting to fire a rocket at Israel.
- On 10 March 2014, Raed Alaa a-Din Nafe'a Z'either (also spelled Zuaiter; aged 38), originally from Nablus, a Jordanian-Palestinian judge with a doctorate in international law, was shot dead, although unarmed, by IDF soldiers at the Allenby Bridge Border Crossing, after arguing with a soldier and pushing him. Israeli officials allege he tried to grab a rifle. It was also claimed he was a terrorist, who shouted "Allahu Akbar" while wielding a metal pole, and then trying to strangle a soldier. Witnesses denied this version, saying Z'either was smoking a cigarette when he was pushed by a border guard and asked not to be insulted. The soldier in the scuffle shot him, and another killed him. The Israeli government later apologized. According to an Al-Haq investigation based on affidavits, Z'either was pushed for being late to board to bus, and pushed the soldier back, a scuffle ensued. Other soldiers arrived, he was pushed to the ground, and began shouting in protest at his maltreatment while walking towards the soldiers, waving his arms. At a distance of four yards away, he was shot once, and then shot again three times.
- On 10 March 2014, Saji Sayel Muhammad Jarab'ah (20) of Beitin died from bullet wounds to the head when ambushed by IDF soldiers near Route 60. Israeli sources say he had been throwing stones earlier.
- On 11 March 2014, Shaher Hamuda Mahmoud Abu Shanab (23), Abd a-Shafi Saleh Mahmoud Abu Mu'ammar (33) and Isma'il Hamed Abed Abu Judahan (22), all Islamic Jihad militants of Um a-Naser in the Rafah district, were killed by an IAF missile while firing mortar shells.
- On 19 March, Yusef a-Shawamreh (14) of Deir al-'Asal al-Fauqa in the Hebron Governorate, was shot dead after being ambushed by IDF soldiers as he and two friends snuck through a gap in the separation barrier to gather edible tumble thistles on family land to which the barrier denies them access.
- On 22 March 2014, Yazan Mahmoud Bassem Jabarin (19), a member of Fatah's al-Aqsa Martyrs' Brigades, from Jenin refugee camp, was shot dead while throwing a molotov cocktail at Israeli security personnel during a clash between camp refugees and troops raiding the camp to arrest Hamzah Jamal Abd a-Salam Abu al-Heija (21), a member of Hamas's al-Qassam Brigades. Abu al-Haija refused to surrender, and anti-tank shells were lobbed into his house.al-Heija exchanged gunfire, a rocket was fired into his home and he was shot dead outside. A third person, Muhammad Omar Saleh Abu Zeinah (21), a member of Islamic Jihad's al-Quds Brigades was shot dead while carrying al-Heija's body.

Furious Palestinian leaders complained that the deaths raised to sixty the number of Palestinians killed by the IDF since the American-sponsored 2013–14 Israeli–Palestinian peace talks began in mid-2013.

== April 2014 ==
284 Palestinians (including 281 civilians, 92 of whom were children), were injured in clashes with Israeli forces. An Israeli settler was killed by Palestinians near Hebron. Fifteen Israelis were injured, including six civilians. 196 Palestinian children were held in detention over April, and 90 were displaced by house demolitions, which spoked in this month with 87 demolitions in Area C. Many of the structures torn down were built with funds from foreign donors. On 6 April, the Israeli Civil Administration declared 1,000 dunums of land in Area C in the Bethlehem Governorate, as Israeli government property, forbidding access by Palestinians to the area.

The majority of the 87 demolitions this month took place in Area C, a third in the Jordan Valley, and several affected three Bedouin communities: Al Jaw'wana, Humsa al Buqai', Tell al Khashabah and the community of Jabal al Baba community. These led to 171 people being left homeless, half of them children. Four Palestinian structures were demolished in East Jerusalem, displacing eight people.

== May 2014 ==
In May, two Palestinians were killed on the West Bank, and 266, of which 246 were civilians, were injured, twenty in the Gaza Strip. OCHA documented a total of 27 incidents involving settler violence in the West Bank. Thirteen Palestinians, including eight children, were hurt in conflicts with settlers or due to use of live ammunition by Israeli forces intervening between the two. There were no Israeli fatal casualties, but 68 were injured, 28 of whom were civilians. At least 355, mainly olive, trees were uprooted by settlers. Five settler attacks took place in the vicinity of the Bat Ayin settlement in the Bethlehem Governorate. On 15 May 2014, fifty grape-trees and five olive trees belonging to a Beit Ummar family, were cut down by settlers.

- On 1 May 2014, Shelly Dadon (19) of Afula was murdered by a Palestinian taxi driver, Hussein Yousef Khalifa (34), from whom she had sought a ride.
- On 5 May 2014, a large swastika was spray-painted on the tomb of a rabbi who lived in the Galilee in the first and second centuries.
- On 15 May 2014, two Palestinian teenagers, Nadim Nuwara (17) and Muhammad Abu Thahr (16) were shot dead at the same site, each while walking away some distance from the protest, and reportedly by Israeli Border Police, within an hour of each other after a solidarity demonstration outside the jail in Beitunia. In both cases, video caught the event in real time. Neither of the youths was armed. Israeli sources at first dismissed the shootings shown on the videos as a fiction staged by Palestinians. In November, after forensic examination on a bullet that killed one of the victims revealed its provenance in Israeli equipment, a border policeman was arrested on suspicion of the unauthorized use of lethal arms with regard to Nuwara's death, and was indicted and charged with manslaughter. The indictment stated that "[t]he defendant used the blanks magazine so that his live fire, as opposed to rubber-bullet fire, would not be observed", and that he targeted Nuwara's torso "with the intent of causing him grave injury, and while anticipating the possibility that he would cause his death."

== June 2014 ==
The IDF conducted 767 raids in the West Bank and East Jerusalem between 1 June and 31 August 2014, following the abduction of three Israeli teenagers. Seven people were killed during confrontations with IDF soldiers conducting search operations. For the period May–June the number of clashes between Palestinians and Israeli forces totaled 100.

- On 12 June 2014, three Israeli youths were kidnapped by two Hamas-affiliated militants from Hebron and, apparently. almost immediately shot dead.
- On 16 June 2014, the IDF shot and wounded a Palestinian caught trying to set fire to the fence of a Jewish town.

The IDF shot dead a Palestinian, Ahmed Sabarin (Ahmad Arafat Husseini Samad'ah) (21) at the Al-Jalazone refugee camp during a night raid in which he threw rocks. Two others were wounded during clashes protesting the search operation.

- On 20 June 2014, Mustafa Husseini Taher Aslan (23) of Qalandiya Camp, al-Quds district, threw improvised grenade was thrown at a soldier in the incident, who suffered light wounds. He was shot by the soldiers.

Muhammad Jihad Muhammad Dudin (15) of Dura, Hebron was among a group of stone-throwing youths, as troops who had engaged in a search raid were withdrawing from the town at 05:30 Operation Brother's Keeper. The soldiers, in retaliation for the stone-throwing, shot Israeli troops arrived in the town at 22:00. Throughout the night hundreds of children and teens threw stones and were shot at with tear gas. Mohammad watched from his window at least until 03:30. Soldiers raided numerous homes. The withdrawal began at 04:45. The last column began to leave just after 05:00. According to his family, Mohammad left his house secretly before dawn. His cousin and neighbor Mahmoud Dudin (21) was an eyewitness and recounted that suddenly a soldier in the rearguard wheeled round and aimed at the demonstrating youngsters at 80 metres, and fired 6 live-fire shots. Mohammad called on his cousin to help him, after he was hit. His last words were:' "Take care of yourself, take care of my parents, I love them."

- On 22 Jun 2014, Ahmad Sa'id So'ud Khaled (27) of Ein Beit al-Ma' refugee camp in the Nablus Governorate, was shot with several rounds in Nablus. Khaled suffered from mental illness and epilepsy, and failed to stop while called on to halt, as he walked in the direct of Israeli troops. His family said he had been on the way to dawn prayers at the local Omer Ben al-Khattab Mosque. Soldiers raiding houses 10 metres from his own shot at him at a distance of 30 metres and 4 bullets hit him in the abdomen, back, right thigh and right shoulder.
- On 27 June 2014, Osamah Hassan Musa al-Hassumi (28) of Beit Lahiya, and Muhammad Muhammad Ramadan al-Fasih (22) of Gaza City, both members of the military wing of the Popular Resistance Committees, were killed in a targeted assassination at Al-Shati refugee camp by an IAF missile. The strike occurred while they were travelling in a car.
- On 29 June 2014, Muhammad Zayed Salem Obeid (26) of Wadi as-Salqa, in the Deir al-Balah Governorate, a Hamas militant, was killed by an IAF drone-launched missile strike.

== July 2014 ==
According to Shin Bet, in July 2014 Palestinians carried out a record number of attacks in the West Bank and East Jerusalem against settlers and Israeli forces: in 507 incidents, 90% involved the throwing of firebombs, compared to 100 such incidents in May. According to OCHA, these clashes were triggered by the Israeli crackdown in the West Bank after the abduction of three Israeli youths.

- On 1 July 2014, a teenager, Yusef Ahmad Bani Gharrah (also known as Yousef Abu Zagha), of Jenin refugee camp was killed by multiple wounds in his upper torso while out walking with several other young men. The incident occurred during an arrest raid and the shots were fired by uniformed and plainclothes Israeli security forces. Israeli sources claim he was a Hamas militant on the point of throwing an explosive device.

A mob consisting of several hundred Jews, who had participated in a demonstration with MK Michael Ben-Ari and Itamar Ben-Gvir (Jewish National Front), went on a rampage through Jerusalem. The group shouted slogans like "death to Arabs", "a Jew is a brother, an Arab is a bastard", "we want war", "Mohammed is dead", and "Kahane was right", and attacked five Arab bystanders, two of whom required medical treatment. A McDonald's restaurant was attacked on suspicion that Arabs were employed there. Three Palestinian laborers eating their evening meal in a parking lot were cornered by 100 youths who attacked them until undercover police arrested three of the assailants.

- On 2 July 2014, a day after the burial of the three Israeli teenagers, a Palestinian boy, Mohammed Abu Khdeir (also spelled Mohammad Abu Khdair), was kidnapped, doused in petrol and torched just outside Jerusalem, in retaliation. Later that day, at least 35 Palestinians and journalists were injured by riot control police use of rubber-bullets in a violent demonstration, involving stone-throwing and fireworks, protesting the murder of Abu Khdeir (or Abu Khdair) at Shuafat, East Jerusalem.
- On 8 July, war broke out between Israel and Hamas. In the ensuing conflict, 72 Israelis died (66 soldiers and 6 civilians). Among Gazans, 2,192 died (1,523 believed to be civilians, including 519 children; 70% under age 12) and 269 women. 557 of these were identified as militants, and 146 are of unknown status. Some 11,000 Gazans were wounded, and 500,000 displaced from their homes.
- On 14 July 2014, Munir Ahmad Hamdan al-Badarin (18), of as-Samu, Hebron Governorate, was ambushed by an IDF unit sometime after 05:45, while he and some others were engaged in stone-throwing, near the entrance to their village, at Route 317. Eight others in the group were pursued and fired on with rubber-coated metal bullets and tear gas at them. The IDF said they'd fired at his legs, but he was hit in the waist.
- On 21 July 2014, Alaa Jihad Ahmad a-Sghayer (20), of Idhna, Hebron Governorate, was seriously wounded by IDF gunfire responding to his throwing of firecrackers in protest at Operation Protective Edge. He died eight days later on 29 July 2014.
- On 21 July 2014, Mahmoud Hatem Mahmoud Shawamreh (26), of Al-Ram, was shot dead by the IDF, after he and a group of young men fled on sighting an IDF jeep, as they prepared to throw Molotov cocktails. Shawamreh tried to lob a Molotov cocktail at his pursuers, and he was shot three times with live ammunition a military jeep.
- On 22 July 2014, Mahmoud Saleh Ali Hamamreh (29), of Husan, Bethlehem Governorate, was shot in the chest by the IDF as he emerged from his grocery store to witness a clash, and died shortly afterwards on the following day. An IDF spokesperson stated the unit had fired rubber-coated metal bullets at some fifty Palestinians involved in throwing stones and Molotov cocktails.
- On 23 July 2014, Mohammad Qasem Hamamreh (19) was hit in the head with a tear gas canister at 07:00, after attending Mahmoud Hamamreh's funeral in Husan, during a clash in which he participated. He died the following day in hospital.
- On 24 July 2014, Muhammad Ziad Abd al-Fatah A'araj (17), of Qalandiya, al-Quds Governorate, was killed after being shot in the head, arm and leg by live ammunition in Qalandia refugee camp, while protesting the military's actions in Operation Protective Edge. According to B'Tselem, he was unarmed, contrary to what Israeli officials allege. Some Palestinian gunfire occurred after he was killed.
- On 25 July 2014, Eid Rabah Abd al-Qader Fdeilat (28) of al-Arrub refugee camp, Hebron Governorate was shot in both his chest and legs as he fled, after quarreling with IDF soldiers at a flying roadblock near his home. The altercation arose as he protested that the roadblock hindered his brothers from coming to break their Ramadan Iftar meal at his home. The IDF account said he tried to wrest a rifle from a soldier.
- On 25 July 2014, Nasri Mahmoud Nasri Taqatqah (14) of Beit Fajjar, Bethlehem Governorate, was killed by IDF fire during a demonstration in his village.
- On 25 July 2014, ATayeb Saleh Muhammad Saleh Shhadeh (20) of Huwara, Nablus Governorate, was shot in the head when he fired firecrackers at police officers in clashes that erupted shortly after the fatal shooting of a Palestinian by a settler.
- On 25 July 2014, three residents of Beit Ummar, Hebron Governorate, Hashem Abu Mariyah (50), Sultan Yusef Muhammad a-Shaqadam (Sultan Za'aqiq) (30) and Abd Alhamid Al Brigheith (38), were shot dead as Israeli forces used live fire to disperse a demonstration, which began as a procession at noon from the 'Asidah Mosque after noon prayers. Several villagers tried get close to an IDF military tower to throw stonesd. Abu Mariiyah, an advocate of children's rights working for the Defense for Children International – Palestine NGO was shot in the chest at 14:00 while standing alone by a side-street inside the village, far from the military watch tower, and reportedly waiting for the chance to cross a street. The other two stood among a group of roughly three dozen boys and men. Sultan Za'aqiq, who had thrown stones, was shot in the chest and back at 14:20 by an IDF soldier on a rooftop some 60 meters away; Al Brigheith, who had not engaged in stone-throwing, was shot in the legs and abdomen as he ran to try and succor the fallen Sultan Za'aqiq. Human Rights Watch, after an investigation, called the deaths a case of reckless and unlawful killings by Israel.
- On 25 July 2014, Eid Fdeilat (26), of the al-Arroub refugee camp, Hebron Governorate, was shot as he attempted to go over a road to join his brothers at the breaking of the Ramadan fast. IDF Soldiers at the camp exit gates refused to allow him to pass. A scuffle left a soldier on the ground. Fdeilat fled, and he was gunned down by live ammunition hits to the back and shoulder. The IDF said he'd tried to snatch a soldier's rifle.
- On 26 July 2014, Khaled Odeh and Tayeb Odeh (21), both from Huwara, Nablus Governorate, were killed when demonstrators, in procession from the village mosque, encounter settlers in a car, and threw stones at it. On their way, the demonstrators encountered settlers in a vehicle and one youth threw stones at it. Khaled was killed when one passengers shot with live fire. A clash erupted between the demonstrators and Israeli soldiers, and the IDF shot Tayeb in the head, killing him. A Border Police spokesperson said the demonstrator had been shot after he had thrown firecrackers at them from close range.
- On 26 July 2014, Bassem Sati Sadeq Abu a-Rob (18) of Qabatiya, Jenin Governorate, was shot in the chest, and died on 29 July 2014. A demonstration was underway consisting of several thousand people, marching from Jenin towards the Jalameh checkpoint 200 yards away. The killing occurred after he lobbed a Molotov cocktail in the direction of IDF troops, during a demonstration against Israel's military operations in the West Bank.

According to B'Tselem, in the roughly three-week period since the opening of hostilities (July 7) to month's end, Israeli fire wounded at least 577 Palestinians in the West Bank, 388 being shot with live fire rounds, and most were hit in the lower torso and limbs. Palestinians report that 0.22-inch-caliber bullets apparently ruled out for dispersing demonstrations or public disturbances, and snipers, were being used.

== August 2014 ==
- On 1 August 2014, Tammer Faraj Muhammad Qab (20) of Deir al-Ghusun, Tulkarm Governorate, was shot in the chest and killed in Tulkarm by IDF soldiers during a protest demonstration against Israel's Operation Protective Edge in Gaza
- On 1 August 2014, Udai Nafez Fakhri Jaber (19) of Rafat, al-Quds Governorate was shot in the chest and killed in Saffa by Border police for throwing stones at them, during a demonstration against Israel's Operation Protective Edge in Gaza.
- On 4 August 2014, an apparently lone gunman shot and wounded a soldier who had been patrolling Mount Scopus.
- On 4 August 2014, a Palestinian man drove an excavator type of tractor out of a construction site, injuring several pedestrians and killing one man before ramming the tractor into a public bus.
- On 8 August 2014, Muhammad Ahmad Yusef Qatri (18) of al-Am'ari refugee camp, was shot in the chest and killed near the settlement of Pisgot by an Israeli soldiers after throwing stones during a protest against Israel's Operation Protective Edge in Gaza.
- On 8 August 2014, Nader Muhammad Sa'di Abd al-Ghani Idris (42) was shot in the chest and killed in Saffa, Ramallah by Border police during a protest against Israel's Operation Protective Edge in Gaza. He died the following day.
- On 10 August 2014, Khalil Muhammad Ahmad al-'Anati (10) of al-Fawwar refugee camp, Hebron Governorate, was shot in the back and killed while in a company of boys who were throwing stones at a military jeep.
- On 11 August 2014, Zakaria Musa Da'ud Sa'id (22) of Qabalan, Nablus Governorate was killed in Qabalan after suffering from several gunshot wounds to the face and body fired by undercover Israel Border Police officers, during a firefight occasioned by an attempt to arrest him.
- On 11 August, according to a Hebron mother of twelve, Jihad al-Atrash, a Jewish intruder concussed al-Atrash's four-year-old son, by pushing him off the balcony of her house in a dispute, causing him problems in walking properly.
- On 22 August 2014 Hassan Hazem Abd al-Hamid Ashur (16) of Nablus was shot during a demonstration against Israel's Operation Protective Edge in Gaza, by IDF forces in Beit Furik, and died three days later.
- On 31 August 2014 Muhammad Abd al-Hamid Ibrahim Sinuqrut (15) of Wadi al-Joz, East Jerusalem was wounded by a sponge round shot by Israeli police which caused a fatal head wound, and died on 4 September 2014.

== September ==
- On 10 September 2014, Issa Khaled Issa Qatri (22) of al-Am'ari refugee was shot in the chest while watching an arrest operation by Israeli troops. The IDF alleges he tried to lob a pipe-bomb their way.
- On 16 September 2014, an Israeli construction worker, Netaniel Arami (27), fell from the 11th floor of a building where he was working, closing vents using a rappeller's cables. His family, as well as Israeli politician Moshe Feiglin, deputy speaker of the Knesset, and some websites, suggested he had been murdered by Arab co-workers. The police initially insisted his death was accidental. In late November, it emerged that Shin Bet had arrested three suspects on suspicion it was a nationalistically motivated crime. They were subsequently released for lack of evidence. The investigation is now treating it as a terror crime, and his family have been recognized as victims of terror.
- On 23 September 2014, Marwan Qawasmeh (29) and Amar Abu-Isa (32), both of Hebron, the suspected killers of 3 Israeli youths, were shot dead as they exchanged fire with IDF forces attempting to arrest them.

== October 2014 ==
Tensions in East Jerusalem began to rise in late October, as the number of Palestinian Jerusalemites injured by Israeli forces since 1 July rose to 1,333 (among which 80 children), while four had been shot dead. In the same period, three Israelis were killed and 65, of whom 33 were civilians, suffered injuries from Palestinians. Seventeen incidents of Palestinians throwing stones in the West Bank and East Jerusalem at Israeli vehicles and buses were reported, occasioning five injuries while Israeli authorities demolished 33 structures in the West Bank and east Jerusalem through 28 October to 4 November for lack of permits, bringing the overall number of demolitions of Palestinian property this year to 552 by 3 November.

- On 16 October 2014, Bahaa a-Din Samir Musa Bader (12) of Beit Liqya in the Ramallah and al-Bireh Governorate was shot dead by soldiers as clashes arose when the latter attempted to deliver a suppoena to a village resident. IDF sources say he was shot after throwing a Molotov cocktail in their direction.
- On 17 October 2014, a mob of eleven Jewish men, cursing Arabs, assaulted a Palestinian male, Muhammad Azzam (20), an employee of the Rimonim Shalom Hotel in Jerusalem, and reportedly tried to strangle him with a rope. He was rescued by security guards and taken to Shaare Zedek Medical Center for treatment.
- On 19 October 2014, A settler from Yitzhar struck 2 Palestinian -5 and 8-year-old girls with his car while they got off their school bus to return home from their kindergarten near the village of Sinjil. One of the girls, Einas Khalil, was killed; the other Nilin Asfour, sustained serious injuries. The driver fled from the scene for fear of being lynched. He immediately reported the incident and stopped at Ofra, the closest Jewish town on his way. Israeli police concluded it was an accident. Palestinians at the scene asserted it was deliberate. The accident took place on Highway 60, an intercity road where the speed limit is 80 km/h (50 Miles/h).
- On 22 October, Adbel-Rahman Shaloudi, a 21-year-old Palestinian, who is said to have joined Hamas in prison, and who came from the East Jerusalem neighborhood of Silwan, rammed his car into a group of passengers waiting at the Ammunition Hill Light Rail station. The attack left two dead, including a three-month-old baby, and seven injured. Shaloudi was shot dead while running from the scene. A brief uptick in Arab rioting followed. NGOs, such as Amnesty International and B'Tselem claim that Shaludi's case, and several others in similar incidents where a suspect was killed on the spot, raise suspicions that Israel is encouraging a policy of extrajudicial killings, or executions without trial.
- On 24 October 2014, Urwah Abd al-Wahab Abd al-Ghani Khaleq (14) of Silwad, was shot dead by soldiers while he was trying to throw a Molotov cocktail at a car on Route 60.
- On 30 October 2014, American-born Jewish activist Yehuda Glick was the subject of an assassination attempt. The main suspect was later shot and killed while resisting arrest, according to the police. Police spokesman Micky Rosenfeld stated that a raid of Muataz Hijazi (32), who was shot dead, provided them with substantial evidence linking Hijazi to the shooting. The suspect was said to have had a handgun and to have attempted to fire at police officers. Local Palestinian eyewitnesses challenge the account, claiming he was wounded at the time of the incursion, lay on the rooftop, had an electric drill nearby, and was shot at and crushed by a water-tank. Hijazi had been a member of Islamic Jihad and served eleven years in Israeli prisons for security offenses; Islamic Jihad immediately published an obituary claiming Hijazi as a member. Fifteen people were injured when Israeli forces fired on them as they attempted to take Hijaz to hospital after the shootout.

Mahmoud Abbas responded to the security closure of the Temple Mount, stating that "harming the places sacred to Muslims and Christians is a red line", that he would "not permit this line to be crossed," and that the closure was a "declaration of war". His call to Palestinians to protect the Temple Mount from visits by Jews "by any means" has been widely viewed in Israel as incitement to violence. Israeli prime minister Netanyahu characterized Abbas' call as part of "a wave of incitement by radical Islamic elements and by Palestinian Authority Chairman Abu Mazen (Mahmoud Abbas)".

Abbas' Fatah Party called for Friday, 31 October 2014, to be a "Day of Rage" in Jerusalem. The protests on 31 October and on 1 November were not notably large and there was little violence.

== November 2014 ==
Weeks of unrest and high tension ensued after the visit on 2 November by Moshe Feiglin to the Temple Mount, after Prime Minister Netanyahu called for restraint and Jordan warned that attempts to alter the status quo of the Haram al-Sharif would imperil the Jordan-Israel peace agreement.

During the first three weeks of the month, Israeli police and soldiers detained some 380 Palestinians, adding to more than 5000 in prison, and another 200 in "administrative detention". From the 4–10 November, four Israelis were killed and 23 injured by Palestinians, while in East Jerusalem, 328 Palestinians were injured in clashes with Israeli police. Israeli authorities demolished or confiscated 26 Palestinian buildings in East Jerusalem and Area C of the West Bank for lack of permits, causing the displacement of 90 people. From 22 October - 10 November, 22 homes were demolished in east Jerusalem alone.

- On 5 November 2014, Ibrahim al-Akri (or Ibrahim al-Akary), a Hamas operative from Shuafat, deliberately drove a van at high speed into a crowd of people waiting at the Shimon HaTzadik light rail station in the Arzei HaBira neighborhood of Jerusalem. Al-Akri was shot dead by police after getting out of his van and attacking people with a metal rod. The attack left three dead, including the perpetrator, and thirteen wounded, one of whom a Palestinian. A border police was killed on the site, Yeshiva student Shalom Ba'adani (17) was critically hurt and succumbed to his wounds several days later. The injured Palestinian, 60 years old, was reported as an Israeli victim, but handcuffed as a suspected accomplice, and died of his injuries on December 7.
- On 5 November, an additional vehicular attack occurred just hours after the Jerusalem Light Rail attack. Hamam Jamal Badawi Masalmeh drove at high speed into three Soldiers waiting at a bus stop. All three were injured in this attack. Masalmeh fled the scene and the next morning he turned himself in to the police claiming it was an accident. On 20 November 2014, Israeli police announced that the driver now stated that he had deliberately attempted to run over the victims in a deliberate attack emulating recent Palestinian vehicular homicides.
- On 6 November, a 24-year-old Palestinian working in Ma'ale Adumim was beaten by settlers; his injuries required his hospitalization.
- On 7 November 35 Palestinians at a party gathering suffered from severe tear-gas inhalation when canisters were fired at the group, and 70 Palestinians at Shuafat refugee camp were injured by rubber bullets in clashes with police.
- On 7 November 2014, an Israeli Arab, Kheir Hamdan (22) was shot dead in Kafr Kanna after having approaching a police car with what appeared, reportedly, to be a knife. The police shot him several times in the back as he was walking away. The incident, caught on video, was an "execution" according to MK Ahmad Tibi, and the mayor of the township called it "murder in cold blood" and "state terror". Demonstrations broke out, linking the incident to other events. In one protest, at Haifa University calls were made for a third intifada.
- On Monday, 10 November 2014, Almog Shiloni, aged 20, from Modi'in, was stabbed at the Haganah Railway Station in Tel Aviv, after a struggle with a Palestinian who attempted to grab his weapon. Shiloni was on the phone with his girlfriend, when 18-year-old Nur al-Din Abu Khashiyeh, a resident of Nablus illegally staying in Israel, stabbed him in the stomach. Shiloni sustained massive blood loss and succumbed to his wounds at the Tel HaShomer Medical Center in Ramat Gan. Abu Khashiyeh was chased and eventually taken into custody by Israeli police.
- On Monday, 10 November 2014, four hours after the killing of Shiloni, Maher al-Hashlamun stabbed three Israelis at the entrance to the settlement of Alon Shvut in Gush Etzion, killing a young woman, Dalia Lemkus (26), and wounding two others. A man in his mid-20s was stabbed in the stomach, suffering light-to-moderate wounds, and was taken to the Hadassah Medical Center in Jerusalem's Ein Kerem, a second man in his 50s was lightly wounded, suffering from stab wounds to the jaw, and was taken to the Shaare Zedek Medical Center, also in Jerusalem. Lemkus was seriously wounded but attempts to resuscitate her failed and she was pronounced dead at the scene. Al-Hashlamun was shot in the chest by a security guard and taken to the same medical center as his victim. Al-Hashlamun, a resident of Hebron, is a member of Islamic Jihad. He was jailed in Israel (2000–05) after being convicted of throwing Molotov cocktails at an IDF patrol.
- On 11 November Israeli forces shot and killed with a single shot to the chest Muhammad Jawabreh(19) during a raid on Arroub refugee camp, the 44th victim of such shootings in 2014. According to Palestinian eyewitnesses and B'Tselem he was shot by a sniper while, holding a teapot, he and friends watched from his window clashes taking place 250 metres away. He had been struck by a rubber-coated bullet earlier that day in clashes, and had gone home. IDF soldiers immediately searched the house for a gun, which they said he held him in hand, but found none. The IDF claims the soldiers were under a threat after firebombs were thrown at them.
- On 11 November, Israeli settlers damaged two Palestinian factories in Huwara village.
- On 12 November, during an arrest raid in Beitunia, Israeli police shot and seriously wounded Ahmed Hassouneh (25), shooting him in the thighs and pelvis. He was closing the gates of his house after an evening with his guests when shot four times. He is now paralysed. Israeli sources say they mistook him for someone else.
- On 12 November, the Al-Mughayyir mosque in the Ramallah and al-Bireh Governorate was damaged extensively when it was torched, reportedly by settlers in what was believed to be a price-tag attack. Israeli police say the incident does not match previous 'price tag' attacks, and that a full investigation was impossible because they were denied entry to the village by Palestinian authorities. According to Haaretz journalist Chaim Levinson, it was the 10th such mosque subject to arson in Israel and the West Bank since June 2011, and no investigation has ever led to an indictment.
- On 12 November, a group of religious settlers damnaged trees and reportedly tried to set fire to crops while touring and performing religious rites near Nahalin in the Bethlehem Governorate.
- On 13 November 2014, Saleh Mahmoud (an 11-year-old Palestinian boy) was shot in the face by a foam-tipped bullet fired by Israeli forces during clashes in the Isawiya neighborhood of East Jerusalem. He was blinded in one eye, and, as of January 2015, is at risk of losing sight in the other.
- On 14 November 2014 two Palestinians of Deir Nidham in the Ramallah and al-Bireh Governorate were beaten, when roughly 200 settlers from the Halamish settlement, a number armed, intruded into their village, hurling stones. The IDF intervened, shot tear canisters and wounded one Palestinian, who was shot in the back.
- On 15 November 2014 a youth sustained a serious head wound when Palestinians clashed with Israeli police in East Jerusalem's At-Tur neighborhood.
- On 16 November 2014 an eleven-year-old Palestinian boy was shot by Israeli border police near Kibbutz Be'eri by an IDF force after ignoring calls to stop approaching the barrier from Gaza's side of the border. He was taken to an Israeli hospital in critical condition.
- On 16 November, an unidentified Jewish male was stabbed, suffering moderate injuries, by a Palestinian near the Damascus Gate in Jerusalem. Magen David Adom paramedics arrived at the scene to treat the man and transfer him to Shaare Zedek Medical Center in Jerusalem. Police said they set up roadblocks in their search for the attacker, which is focused around the Old City. Hamas praised the stabbing.
- On 16 November 2014, Yussuf al-Ramuni, a Palestinian bus driver working for Israeli Egged company, was found hanged in his bus in Har Hotzvim. Israeli police conducted an autopsy, determining that the hanging was a suicide and that "there were no signs of violence on the body". The autopsy report, reportedly written by an Arab coroner, was to be handed over to Ramuni's family, along with his body. However, the family and friends of the man disputed that claim. According to his family's lawyer, a Palestinian doctor who attended the autopsy stated that al-Ramuni had been murdered. Al-Ramuni's coworker, Muatasem Fakeh, claimed he saw evidence of violence on al-Ramuni's body, and that it wasn't possible to hang oneself, where he was found, on the back stepos of the bus. The bus driver's family said he had been a happy man, and accused "settlers" of killing him. The Israeli director of the Institute where the autopsy was performed stated that the Palestinian doctor, Sabir al-Aloul, concurred that the cause of death was suicide. However, the Palestinian doctor, director of Al-Quds University's Institute of Forensic Medicine, has gone on the record stating that he suspects foul play: his first vertebra was not dislocated and livor mortis signs were on his buttocks, not his legs. The pathologist refused to answer a summons to be questioned by Israeli police.

Al-Ramuni's funeral was attended by thousands. At the mourners' tent in Jabel Mukaber, according to a Ynet source, the idea he had committed suicide was dismissed by all; those who feel crazy, it was claimed by locals, always go to the mosque and, bowing their head to the ground, discharge their madness by "earthing", a metaphor the locals, eletricians to much of Jerusalem, use. People there do not commit suicide, they claimed. The Palestinian foreign ministry accused the Israeli police of "attempts to hide the hideous crime" by claiming it was suicide. With rumours about the alleged murder running rampant, small riots broke out on the night of 16 November, in a number of Jerusalem locations, including At-Tur, Isawiya, Abu Dis, and Ras al-Amud. On 17 November 2014, stones were thrown at Israeli vehicles in several locations in Jerusalem. One driver was lightly wounded.

- On 18 November, during the morning prayer, two Palestinian men entered a synagogue in the Har Nof neighbourhood of Jerusalem, opened fire on the worshippers, and attacked them with axes. Four rabbis (three of whom were U.S. citizens) were killed, and eight other people wounded, four seriously. Two police officers arrived on the scene and exchanged fire with the murderers, killing both. Zidan Saif, an ethnic Druze police officer, was killed in the firefight and another was wounded. Both attackers were from East Jerusalem. Hamas and Fatah welcomed the attack, claiming it was a response to the death of Yussuf al-Ramuni, the Palestinian bus driver who is believed to have committed suicide (see above).
- On the 20 November 53 Palestinians were injured in clashes with Israeli forces at Al Eizariya, including 3 by live fire.
- Overnight on 20–21 November 2014, a wave of anti-Palestinian hate crimes, involving 6 separate incidents, was reported across Israel and Jerusalem.
- On 21 November 2014, Ahmad Yaqub al-Ghoul was beaten into unconsciousness, reportedly by 3 Israeli settlers using iron bars and belts, near the Damascus Gate in Jerusalem.

Israeli forces opened fire on Palestinian protesters marching in demonstrations across the West Bank, in Qalandia checkpoint, in al-Bireh near Ramallah, in Kafr Qaddum, al-Masara, Jalazun refugee camp, Aida, and other villages, injuring dozens.
In the afternoon, a Palestinian woman, Suzanne al-Kurd (29), was run over by a Jewish settler's car, while she was walking to prayers, near Shuafat in East Jerusalem. The car reportedly accelerated as she was crossing the road, and then sped away on hitting her.
In At-Tur, in the early evening, a brawl broke out between Jewish settlers and Palestinians, resulting in two Israelis being lightly injured. The Israelis claimed that two yeshiva students near the Beit Orot seminary on the Mount of Olives had been attacked by Palestinian youths wielding stones, metal bars and a nail-studded plant, and suffered moderate wounds. In Palestinian accounts there were three Israeli "settlers" who, driving through At-Tur, suddenly stopped their car, got out and "provoked" residents.

- 22 November
  - The family home of a widow, Huda Kumail and her seven children in Khirbet Abu Falah was firebombed by assailants believed to be Jewish. In March 2015, Meir Ettinger was arrested at the Sha'ar Binyamin Industrial Zone on suspicion of involvement in the arson, but was subsequently released for lack of information, as opposed to intelligence. He was put under an administrative restraint order barring him from the West Bank. The incident was recalled when the same settler's name came up in connection with a similar, this time lethal, event, the Duma village arson attack in July 2015.
  - An Haredi bus driver, Hezi Verdiger of Bnei Brak, was punched in the nose at the Megiddo bus-stop by an Arab youth. Also, a Palestinian pharmacist was hospitalized after being struck in the leg by an Israeli stun grenade.
  - On 23 November 2014, Fadel Mohammed Halawa, a 32-year-old Palestinian, was killed in an incident on the Israel/Gaza border. It was the second border-crossing attempt of the morning in that area. According to Israeli army spokesmen, soldiers spotted men approaching the border. called to them to halt, got out the handcuffs to make arrests, and fired warning shots as the intruders approached, finally shooting at the legs. One of the intruders ran away, the other fell and was taken off in an ambulance. According to Palestinian sources, he died at a Gaza medical facility. According to Halawa's family, the man reportedly had been searching for songbirds nesting in the trees near the border, on farmland he owns, which command a high price in Gaza's markets.
  - The convoy of Rami Hamdallah, Palestinian PM, was pulled over for speeding near Eli.
- On 24 November 2014, three Israeli youths attacked an 18-year-old Palestinian from Ras al-Amud; the Palestinian was treated for wounds to his stomach and foot.

A Jewish man (45) was stabbed in the stomach, and said Arabs were responsible. The incident, near Jerusalem's old city, was first reported as a brawl when several Palestinians attacked three yeshiva students. Police later determined the 2 injured Jews had been ambushed by 4 Palestinian youths.
A Palestinian youth, Mahmoud Ubeid (19), claimed he was attacked by five Israelis armed with rods and knives, stepping out from a car that had pulled over to ask him for a lighter, near French Hill in East Jerusalem. He was treated for leg injuries but managed to escape.
A Jewish driver reportedly drove his car at an Israeli Palestinian, Khalil al-Kiswani in the Romema neighborhood of Jerusalem, and, according to the boy's father, ran over his foot. The Hadassah Medical Center diagnosed fractures to his foot.

- On 25 November 2014 two Palestinians were run over by an Israeli bus at the al-Jalama checkpoint in Jenin, killing one, Noor Hassan Naim Salim (22) and injuring Alaa Kayid Salim (20), both from Nablus. Police arrested the bus-driver.
- On 25 November 2014 a Palestinian youth was shot in the head, and sustained moderate to serious injuries, with a fractured skull, when hit with a rubber-coated bullet fired by an Israeli soldier at At-Tur, Jerusalem.
- On 28 November 2014 Israeli police opened fire with a mixture of rubber bullets and live ammunition on a demonstration, conducted weekly against the closure of the only road connecting the village to outside cities, by 400 people in the village of Kafr Qaddum, wounding an Italian solidarity activist Patrick Corsi (30). Eleven Palestinians were also injured. Corsi was we reportedly wearing a yellow high visibility jacket when he was shot in the chest from a distance of some 40 meters: his condition, initially critical, was declared stable after recovery in the Rafidia hospital. One of the wounded Palestinians, Sami Jumma (18), was also struck in the chest by live fire. The IDF response was that it was firing at masked men who were throwing stones at them. Corsi, whom doctors say is lucky to have survived, says he was struck by a sniper bullet while holding a Palestinian flag, and that he is there to help in the olive harvest. He says he has never thrown stones in his life.
- On 29 November 2014 a sixteen-year-old Palestinian of Gaza was shot and remained in a serious condition, after being wounded in the foot by Israeli Border guards after they shot at a group of 3 men east of Jabaliya, who had apparently failed to identify themselves as requested.
- On 30 November 2014 Majdi Majid Najib (26) was reportedly beaten up by five Israelis at a light-rail station in East Jerusalem while purchasing a ticket to go to work in West Jerusalem. The victim of the alleged assault, later hospitalized, claimed that the beating had occurred without the intervention of security guards nearby.

== December 2014 ==
- On 1 December 2014, Josh Lorech (31) from the West Bank settlement of Mahane Yatir, suffered a light wound to his shoulder after being struck on the nape with a knife near the Gush Etzion junction by a Palestinian woman, Amal Taqatqa from the village of Beit Fajjar. Earlier this year, on 25 July, a boy with the same name from Beit Fajjar, Nasri Taqatqa (14) was killed during clashes between villagers and the IDF. The woman had tried to stab a soldier at the same junction three years earlier, reportedly, according to her family, while suffering from mental illness, and is affiliated with Fatah. IDF forces shot the Palestinian attacker four times from a distance of twenty meters after she moved away.

Palestinians threw stones at an Israeli bus on Route 60 between Ofra and Shiloh; no one was hurt. Palestinians threw two firebombs into the backyard of a home in Beit El.

- On 2 December, settlers cut down 50 olive trees, recently planted, on Palestinian land east of Aqraba.
- Over the week from 2 to 8 December, 13 incidents involving Palestinian attacks on Israeli settlers were reported, in which 4 Israelis were injured and 9 instances of property damage registered.
- On 3 December 2014, a Palestinian teen (16) from Al-Eizariya stabbed two Israeli shoppers at the Rami Levy supermarket in the Mishor Adumim Industrial Park in the West Bank, moderately wounding two. An off-duty security guard from the Prime Minister's Office who witnessed the stabbings shot the Palestinian attacker in the leg. The wounded teen tried to flee, but a number of customers held him down until the police arrived.

85 Palestinians were injured, 33 by rubber bullets, at Shuafat when Israeli forces clashed with Palestinians protesting at the demolishment of a structure in the area.

- On 7 December, two Palestinian employees at a petrol station in West Jerusalem were reportedly beaten up by a group of Israelis.
- On 5 December, two Palestinians, aged 19 and 25, were shot by Israeli forces when they were 100 metres from the Gaza/Israel border fence, east of Jabaliya.
- 8 December Muath Nouh al-Rajabi (12) was stabbed in the thigh and shoulder by Israeli settlers who assailed him near the family dwelling, a cave by Bani Na'im near Hebron.
- On 9 December, the windshield of a settler car near Sinjil village, was damaged when a Palestinian threw a rock at the vehicle.
- On 10 December 2014 a minister of the Palestinian Government, Ziad Abu Ein, died of a heart attack after a clash with Israeli soldiers during a peaceful anti-Israeli settlement protest involving villagers from Qaryut, Turmus Ayya, Jalud and al-Mughayer near the West Bank outpost of Adei Ad. A Border policeman had seized him by the throat sometime earlier.

Israeli reportedly used a Molotov cocktail to set fire to a Palestinian factory in the village of Beita near Nablus, causing estimated damages of NIS 250,000 to the owners.

- On 12 December 2014 a Palestinian, Jamal Abd al-Majid Ghayatha (45) from Nahalin sprayed acid through a car window at a settler family, in the West Bank, including a family of five with three young girls, at a West Bank checkpoint between the Palestinian village of Husan and the settlement of Beitar Illit.
- On December 16, 2014, a Palestinian from East Jerusalem attacked with pepper spray a Jewish resident at Yad Binyamin. The Palestinian was part of a crew of thieves and after being spotted and approached, he attacked. The crew wear kippahs so they can be mistaken for Israelis.
- On December 16, 2014 Mahmoud Abdalla (20) was shot in the head and killed by Israeli troops during a raid to arrest people in the refugee camp of Qalandiya, near Ramallah. The live-fire response occurred when camp residents threw stones and explosive charges. Palestinian sources state that Abdalla was shot while standing on the rooftop of his family home. Israeli sources state that he was shot dead after he had hurled an improvised explosive device at them.
- On December 18 Israeli soldiers shot Ahmad Jamil Sharqawi (22) during an arrest raid on the home of Nur Abu Hashya, who had killed an Israeli in Tel Aviv in November. The incident occurred in the Askar refugee camp near Nablus. He was wounded in the hand and required hospitalization.
- On the 19 December, 9 Palestinians were injured, one of whom suffered a broken arm while being arrested, when Israeli soldiers intervened by firing rubber bullets and tear gas canisters at marchers endeavouring to plant trees and set up a memorial to Ziad Abu Ein at Turmus Ayya.

Israeli soldiers, using live fire, shot Bilal Fathi Jumaa (25) in the right leg, during a protest march by villagers in the Qalqiliya village of Kafr Qaddum. Residents of the township have been demonstrating weekly for 3 years over the Israeli closure of the entrance to their village, imposed since 2000.
Israeli forces shot and wounded six Palestinians in their lower limbs while they were taking part in a protest near the al-Shuhada cemetery, close by the Gaza/Israel border.

- On 24 December An Israeli soldier suffered serious wounds from sniper fire, while on a patrol guard for constructions near Kissufim near the southern Gaza border. In response, Taysir al-Smeiri (33), commander of the Hamas Al-Qassam Brigades's observation unit, was shot dead by Israeli forces at al-Qarara east of Khan Younis. 2 other Palestinians were injured.

5-year-old Muhammad Jamal Ubeid was shot in the face by Israeli forces either as he left his school-bus and was walking home with his sister or was standing outside his home. A rubber-coated steel bullet hit him under the eye. The incident took place in the Palestinian village of Al-Issawiyya, East Jerusalem where a clash occurred between Israeli police and teenagers reportedly throwing stones at cars on the road to the Ma'ale Adumim settlement in the West Bank. Police later retracted an earlier statement that they had not used riot dispersal arms nearby.
Two Palestinians, Shihab Nasasra (16) and Ahmad Mleitat (15) were shot with live fire and wounded in clashes with Israeli forces near the Israeli settlement of Itamar.

- On 25 December, two Israelis were injured after a Molotov cocktail was thrown at their vehicle as they returned home to the illegal outpost of El Matan near the West Bank settlement of Ma'ale Shomron and next to the Palestinian village of Azzoun. The two managed to escape the burning car, but Ayala Shapira (11 years old) suffered serious third-degree burn wounds over much of her body, while her father was lightly injured. Two men in connection with the incident were found among 12 men arrested near Kalkilya.
- On the 26 December two Israeli border policemen were lightly wounded in a stabbing attack by a Palestinian in East Jerusalem's Old Quarter. The suspect fled.

The IDF, after ordering them to stop and firing warnings shots into the air, fired non-lethal shots at the legs of two Palestinians from Gaza attempting to climb the barrier fence, wounding one of them. Both were detained for questioning.
4 Palestinians were injured when Israeli forces opened fire with rubber-coated steel bullets at two separate groups of protesters. Two women, aged 48 and 72, were shot at Far'un near Tulkarm, in an ar5ea under full Palestinian authority when an Israel partrol entered the village; and two youths were shot at Beit Ummar, one of them in the head. The IDF stated that the actions were in response to stone-throwing.

- 27 December A Molotov cocktail was thrown through the balcony of an apartment in the Jerusalem neighborhood of Armon Hanatziv, causing damage to property.
- 28 December A settler vehicle ran over a 7-year-old boy, Hamada Ali Ayish Qareesh, of the village of Zif, as he was crossing a road south of Hebron.

3 Palestinians from Gaza were injured by Israel gunfire as they took part in a demonstration protesting the blockade of the Gaza Strip and the lack of reconstruction, near the Eretz Border crossing.
According to the major of Yatta, Moussa Makhamreh, Israeli settler from Karmel set alight the home of Mahmoud Muhammad Jaber al-Adra in the West Bank village of al-Deirat by throwing molotov cocktails inside, after spraying the walls with slogans such as "Death to Arabs" and "Respectfully Leave."

- On 31 December a Palestinian boy, Amir Majed Ahmad Suleiman (10), was hit by a car driven by an Israeli settler, in the main road of the village of Tuqu', southern of Bethlehem. The settler fled though Israeli forces were posted at a checkpoint on the road.
