= Killing of Sergeant Almog Shiloni =

2014 incident in the Israeli–Palestinian conflict

Sergeant Almog Shiloni (Hebrew: אלמוג שילוני) of the Israel Defense Forces was killed on 10 November 2014 after he was stabbed multiple times at Tel Aviv HaHagana Railway Station. He died in hospital from his wounds. Shiloni was off-duty, but in uniform and armed at the time.

The attack was one of a spate of attacks on Israelis during 2014 often cited as a series, and sometimes regarded as an incipient intifada.

== Attack ==
Shiloni, aged 20, from Modi'in, was stabbed at the Haganah Railway Station in southern Tel Aviv, after a struggle with a Palestinian who attempted to grab his rifle. Passerby Gilad Goldman intervened, attacking the assailant and stopping him from grabbing the rifle. Shiloni was on the phone with his girlfriend when he was attacked and stabbed in the stomach and chest several times. Shiloni sustained massive blood loss and succumbed to his wounds at the Tel HaShomer Medical Center in Ramat Gan. A bystander punched the attacker. The attacker was chased and eventually taken into custody by Israeli police.

Nur al-Din Abu Khashiyeh was indicted on charges of entering Israel illegally on 9 November, the day before the attack, and of having intended to kill Shiloni, take his gun, and use the weapon to kill more Jews. Some days after the attack, the suspect walked with police investigators along the route he took on the day of the attack, showing them where he purchased a knife in a flea market, and the route to the site of the murder. The attack was referenced in news reports as part of a series of attacks on Israelis, that, following years of relative calm, included the murder of Shelly Dadon in May, the June kidnapping and murder of 3 teenage boys, a vehicular attack in August, another vehicle attack in October and a third in November, the attempted assassination of an Israeli political activist, a combined ramming/stabbing attack that took place on the same day as Shiloni's murder, and a massacre in a synagogue November 18 in Jerusalem.

=== Victim ===
Shiloni was serving in the Netzah Yehuda Battalion; he was a graduate of the Battalion's first Platoon Commanders' Course, and served in the Battalion's Negev Defenders' section. He was a member of a Nahal Haredi נחל החרדי unit.

Shiloni had a twin brother, Sahar. Over 1,000 people attended Almog Shiloni's funeral at Jerusalem's Mount Herzl military cemetery.

=== Perpetrator ===
The perpetrator, was 18-year-old Nur al-Din Abu Khashiyeh, a resident of Askar refugee camp in the West Bank and an illegal immigrant to Israel from the Palestinian territories. Described by a witness as a "big man," Khashiyeh had been working "for months" on a Tel Aviv construction project near the scene of the killing. He was captured after bystanders directed police to a nearby apartment building where he was hiding; he was transferred to the Shin Bet security services for interrogation.

According to the text of the indictment, the attacker entered Israel intending to kill a soldier so that he could "become a martyr."

He was sentenced to life in prison.

== Reaction ==
Husam Badran, a senior Hamas leader based in Doha, Qatar, lauded the attack saying "(It) is part of a welcome plan that reflects the tenacity of our people to resist the occupation and move against the crimes (committed) in al-Aqsa and in Jerusalem." Islamic Jihad also lauded the attack.

According to CNN, the attack came "amid simmering tensions... between rival Palestinian factions Fatah and Hamas". According to The New York Times, the attack, which followed a series of Palestinian riots and attacks, "shook Israelis’ sense of security and heightened concern about a new Palestinian intifada".

Prime Minister Benjamin Netanyahu immediately convened the Security Cabinet, ordering some troops to switch from training maneuvers to active duty protecting roads from rioters and "terrorists". In it, he accused Palestinian Authority President Mahmoud Abbas of inciting Palestinian and Israeli Arabs by spreading lies.

The stabbing prompted calls to crack down on illegal immigration from the Palestinian Authority to Israel. MK Moti Yogev called on the government to prevent illegal Arab migrants from receiving work permits, and to pass a bill monitoring employers and punishing them if they hire illegal immigrant workers.

The United States condemned the stabbing.

== See also ==
- 2014 Jerusalem tractor attack
- October 2014 Jerusalem vehicular attack
- November 2014 Jerusalem vehicular attack
- Assassination attempt on Yehuda Glick
