= 2014 Jerusalem vehicular attack =

The 2014 Jerusalem vehicular attack may refer to one of three terror attacks that occurred in Jerusalem in 2014.

- August 2014 Jerusalem tractor attack
- October 2014 Jerusalem vehicular attack
- November 2014 Jerusalem vehicular attack
