= Jerusalem vehicular attack =

Jerusalem vehicular attack may refer to:

- October 2014 Jerusalem vehicular attack
- November 2014 Jerusalem vehicular attack
