= Murder of Dalia Lemkus =

2014 stabbing attack in the occupied West Bank

- Alon Shvut (the West Bank) Alon Shvut (Israel)
- Location: Alon Shvut November 10, 2014; 11 years ago
- Date: November 10, 2014; 11 years ago
- Attack type: Vehicle-ramming attack, stabbing
- Weapons: Knife, vehicle
- Deaths: Dalia Lemkus
- Injuries: 2
- Perpetrator: Maher al-Hashlamun

The 2014 Alon Shvut stabbing attack occurred on 10 November 2014, when a Palestinian man attempted to run his vehicle into a crowd waiting at the bus/hitch-hiking station at the entrance to the Israeli settlement of Alon Shvut. When the car hit a bollard, he got out and attacked with a knife, killing a young woman and wounding two others. The attack occurred four hours after the killing of Sergeant Almog Shiloni in Tel Aviv and took place at the same bus/hitch-hiking stop where three Israeli teenagers were kidnapped and murdered in June 2014.

== Attack ==
The attacker, Maher al-Hashlamun, attempted to ram his vehicle into the crowd at the bus stop and then attacked bystanders with a knife. Al-Hashlamun was shot in the chest by a security guard, and was taken to Hadassah Medical Center in Ein Kerem.

=== Victims ===
A 26-year-old woman, Dalia Lemkus (Hebrew: דליה למקוס), a resident of Tekoa, was stabbed in the neck and declared dead at the scene. The daughter of South African immigrants to Israel, she had recently finished her university degree in occupational therapy. She was buried in Tekoa.

Lemkus had been a victim of violence before. In a February 2006 attack that The Jewish Press described as "eerily similar", she was stabbed while waiting at a hitchhiking station at the Gush Etzion Junction. She had continued taking rides at the official hitching posts which are built in areas where public transit is scarce, regarding it as an act of defiance against terrorism. She had been known to say, “You think I’m going to let them beat me?"

Two men were also injured in the attack. A man in his mid-20s was stabbed in the stomach, suffering light-to-moderate wounds, and was taken to the Hadassah Medical Center in Jerusalem's Ein Kerem. A second man in his 50s was lightly wounded, suffering from stab wounds to the jaw, and was taken to the Shaare Zedek Medical Center, also in Jerusalem.

=== Perpetrator ===
The assailant, a resident of Hebron, is a member of Islamic Jihad. He was jailed in Israel from 2000 to 2005 after he was convicted of throwing Molotov cocktails at an IDF patrol. He was sentenced in March 2015 to serve two life sentences.

== Political context ==
According to CNN, the attack comes "amid a new round of infighting between Palestinian factions". Daniel Nisman told The Wall Street Journal the attacks were not centrally coordinated, but, rather, inspired by weeks of social media propaganda by Palestinian groups praising recent individuals who attacked Israelis and calling on Palestinians to replicate those attacks. According to Nisman, these are often copycat attacks, replicating recent incidents, but "They're not ordered. They spontaneous."

== Impact ==
Prime Minister Netanyahu immediately convened the security cabinet, ordering some troops to switch from training maneuvers to active duty protecting roads from rioters and terrorists.

== See also ==
- 2014 Jerusalem tractor attack
- October 2014 Jerusalem vehicular attack
- November 2014 Jerusalem vehicular attack
- Assassination attempt of Yehuda Glick
- Silent Intifada
- 2011 Tel Aviv nightclub attack, another combined car ramming and stabbing attack
- Ohio State University attack, another combined car ramming and stabbing attack
