= January 15, 2014, Baghdad bombings =

Baghdad terrorist attacks

January 15, 2014 Baghdad bombings
- Location: Baghdad, Iraq
- Date: 15 January 2014
- Deaths: 40
- Injuries: 88
- Perpetrator: Islamic State

The January 15, 2014 Baghdad bombings occurred on 15 January 2014 when at least eight car bombs exploded in north, central and eastern Baghdad killing 40 civilians and injuring 88 others. The bombs targeted a number of open-stall markets and commercial areas, attempting to inflict the maximum number of casualties. The terrorist group ISIS claimed responsibility.
