= Micky Rosenfeld =

Micky Rosenfeld (Hebrew: מיקי רוזנפלד; born 1971) was the Israel Police National Spokesman to the foreign media until 2018. He was appointed to this position as an Inspector in 2005 after serving for eight years as a combat officer in the Yamam counter-terrorism unit. Rosenfeld specialized in operations & Intelligence, trained CT units in techniques & strategies to prevent & respond to terrorist attacks By 2008 he had been promoted to the rank of Chief Inspector. Rosenfeld is responsible for coverage of all major terrorist attacks & events across the country & corresponds to hundreds of media agencies worldwide. Rosenfeld represents the INP, Israel National Police on a National level to all foreign delegations, law enforcement agencies, Homeland Security & VIPs from US & Europe. He was promoted to the rank of Superintendent in 2012.
