= 2014 Jerusalem synagogue attack =

Terrorist attack in Israel

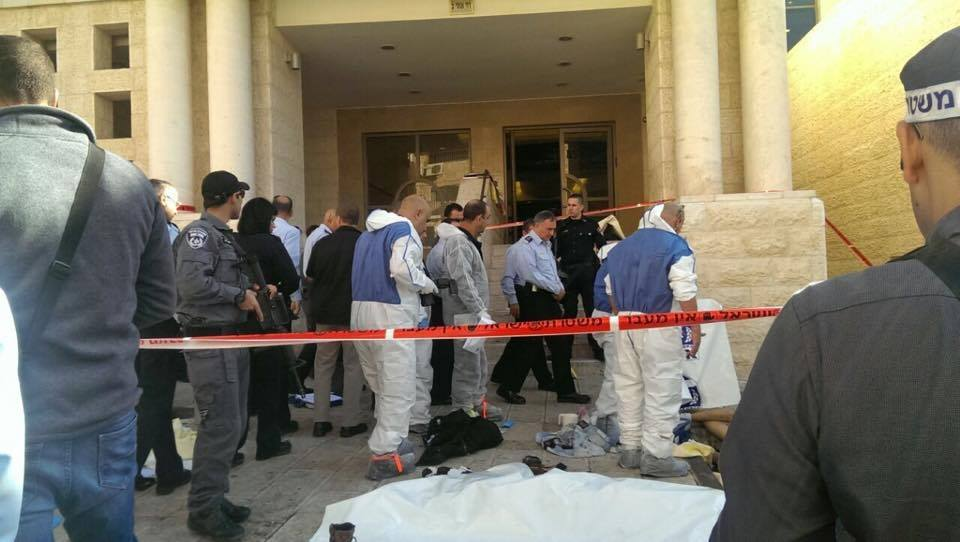
- Police operations at the synagogue shortly after the attack

- The attack site
- Native name: הפיגוע בבית הכנסת קהילת בני תורה
- Location: 31°47′09″N 35°10′31″E; Har Nof, Jerusalem
- Date: 18 November 2014; 11 years ago 6:55 am (UTC+2)
- Attack type: Mass shooting, stabbing
- Weapons: Pistols, axe, knife
- Deaths: 6 (+2 attackers)
- Injuries: 7
- Assailants: Uday Abu Jamal; Ghassan Abu Jamal

On the morning of 18 November 2014, two Palestinian men from Jerusalem entered Kehilat Bnei Torah synagogue, in the Har Nof neighborhood of Jerusalem, and attacked the praying congregants with axes, knives, and a gun. They killed four dual-nationality worshippers, and critically wounded a responding Druze Israeli police officer, who later died of his wounds. They also injured seven male worshippers, one of whom never woke up from a coma and died 11 months later. The two attackers were then shot dead by the police.

Several initial reports claimed that the Popular Front for the Liberation of Palestine (PFLP) had declared responsibility for the attack; Other sources say declarations by PFLP militants were either confused or that the group itself disclaimed responsibility. Israeli authorities stated that 'it seemed the men had acted alone'.

It was the deadliest terror attack in Jerusalem since the Mercaz HaRav massacre in March 2008. The attack was one of a number of violent attacks on Israelis in the summer and autumn of 2014 being called an intifada by some news sources, despite no official intifada being organized by a Palestinian group, as they were in the first and second intifadas.

The UN Security Council condemned the "despicable terrorist attack" in the Jerusalem synagogue.

== Attack ==
At approximately 07:00, during the weekday Shacharit morning prayer, as the worshipers were saying the silent amidah standing prayer, two Arab men from Jerusalem entered Kehilat Bnei Torah synagogue, in the Har Nof neighborhood of Jerusalem, and attacked the worshippers with axes, meat cleavers, and a gun.

The terrorists killed four dual-national worshipers and a responding Druze Israeli police officer, and injured seven male worshipers, one of whom never woke up from a coma and died 11 months later. One of the worshippers fought back and hit a terrorist on the head with a chair twice, before escaping upstairs. It was the deadliest terror attack in Jerusalem since the Mercaz HaRav massacre in March 2008.

Two traffic policemen who heard gunfire came running to the synagogue, and engaged the attackers in a gun battle. A third policeman arrived shortly after, and shot both attackers dead. Two policemen were wounded, one of whom subsequently died from his injuries.

The first responder was a Druze Israeli police officer, Zidan Saif. He was critically wounded when he was shot in the head during the ensuing gun battle, and later died.

The perpetrators shouted "Allahu Akbar!" as they attacked the worshipers.

== Victims ==
Killed:

- Rabbi Moshe Twersky (age 59), an American-Israeli and resident of Har Nof. Twersky was head of the Toras Moshe kollel, son of Harvard professor Rabbi Isadore Twersky, and part of a Boston rabbinical dynasty
- Rabbi Kalman Levine (age 55), an American-Israeli and resident of Har Nof.
- Rabbi Aryeh Kupinsky (age 43), an American-Israeli and resident of Har Nof.
- Rabbi Avraham Shmuel Goldberg (age 68) a British-Israeli.
- Master Sergeant Zidan Saif (age 30), the Druze police officer shot in the head during the attack and rescue response, who later died from his wounds. Saif lived in the Northern Israeli Druze village of Yanuh-Jat, and was father of a 4-month-old daughter.

Seven other male worshipers were wounded by the attackers, two seriously. One of the injured victims, Howard (Chaim) Rotman, having spent nearly a year in a vegetative coma due to multiple cleaver wounds to the face and head, died of his wounds on 23 October 2015.

== Perpetrators ==
The perpetrators, cousins Uday Abu Jamal (22) and Ghassan Muhammad Abu Jamal (32), came from the East Jerusalem neighborhood of Jabel Mukaber, and worked at a grocery store near the synagogue. The two attackers were relatives of PFLP affiliate Jamal Abu Jamal, sentenced to 22 years in prison for attempted murder, released by Israel as part of the 2013–14 Israeli–Palestinian peace talks.

Ghassan Abu Jamal's widow, Nadia, was served with a demolition order on her house in East Jerusalem; her residency rights were revoked, and she was expelled to her family home in the West Bank. Her 3 children, Walid (6), Salma (4) and Mohammed (3) — the last child suffers from a heart condition — are permitted to stay in East Jerusalem as it is their birth-place, but their rights to all social benefits, including medical coverage, were cancelled. She is protesting the measures, which she calls an example of collective punishment. She said that "If we'd known that my husband was planning an attack, of course we would have stopped him" while her in-laws said that they could not come to terms with what pushed Ghassan and Uday to attack the place of worship.

The Popular Front for the Liberation of Palestine (PFLP) was initially reported as claiming responsibility for the attack. Hani Thawbta, a PFLP leader in the Gaza Strip, stated: "We declare full responsibility of the PFLP for the execution of this heroic operation conducted by our heroes". On the PFLP's website, Khalil Maqdesi of the PFLP's Central Committee said the "occupation" was responsible, and that "The PFLP will continue to target every institution of the occupation." Israeli authorities said 'it seemed the men had acted alone'. The police chief had initially said that though his investigation was not complete, he believed it appeared to be a lone wolf attack.

The two men were reportedly affiliated with the PFLP, and the PFLP identified the two as its members, but their family said that they were unaware if that was the case. According to some family members the attackers did not belong to any armed group.

== Motives ==
Two relatives of the attackers said the attack was motivated by what the attackers saw as "threats of a Jewish takeover of Al Aqsa" and the death of a Palestinian bus driver, Youssef al-Ramouni, in Jerusalem's Har Hotzvim bus depot. Israeli authorities said an autopsy found only evidence of suicide, and that a Palestinian pathologist who attended the autopsy, Dr. Saber al-Aloul, initially agreed with the finding. However, the doctor later said the results pointed towards an "organized killing"; many Palestinians believe the bus driver was murdered by Israeli settlers.

== Impact on government policy ==
In response to this and other incidents in a spate of other attacks on Jews in the summer and fall of 2014, Prime Minister Benjamin Netanyahu moved to ease tensions with the Arab world, urging an end to visits to the Temple Mount by government ministers and MKs. In addition, Israel re-instituted the policy of demolishing the homes of Palestinian perpetrators and revoking the residency status of their near relatives. In an unprecedented move it said was intended to deter would-be future attacks, Israel refrained from releasing the bodies of the dead attackers to their families. Israeli Prime Minister Binyamin Netanyahu ordered the demolition of the attackers' homes. Israeli Defense Minister Moshe Ya'alon stated that in light of the recent string of attacks Israel would freeze a series of planned steps to ease life for Palestinians living in the West Bank, including new roadways.

== Response ==
The synagogue which was the site of the attack reopened the following day, once again with shacharit services. The congregation continues to employ Arab workers.

In response to the incident, many protests were conducted around the world. Rabbi Avi Weiss conducted a protest at the Palestinian Embassy in New York City. Ten Jewish men were arrested at a protest in Jerusalem, and 23 others were arrested attempting to block the Jerusalem Light Rail. Memorial services were held in many communities.

Thousands attended Zidan Saif's funeral, including President Reuven Rivlin, Minister of Internal Security Yitzhak Aharonovich, and Chief of Police Yohanan Danino. A Jewish American couple named their child after Zidan Saif to honor his actions.

The FBI had stated that they would join Israeli authorities in an investigation of the attacks, with an eye to whether any organizations or individuals assisted the attackers, and could be prosecuted.

Family and friends of British-Israeli victim Rabbi Avraham Shmuel Goldberg raised funds to dedicate a 3-bed unit in his name in the Emergency Department of Shaare Zedek Medical Center, Jerusalem.

== Reactions ==
=== By country ===
- Bahrain – Sheikh Abu Khalifa, the Foreign Minister of Bahrain, condemned the attack.
- Brazil – The Brazilian Government vehemently condemned the terrorist attack in a synagogue and expressed their solidarity with the mourning families.
- Canada – Prime Minister Stephen Harper condemned the "barbaric act of terror". Harper said Canada's "thoughts and prayers are with the people of Israel".
- Costa Rica – Costa Rica condemned this "act of terrorism which severely impairs human dignity and peace in any society".
- France – President François Hollande issued a statement condemning "the heinous attack ... in a synagogue in Jerusalem and those who dared to welcome the act". Hollande "expressed his deep concern over the chain of violence in Jerusalem and the West Bank".
- Germany – Frank-Walter Steinmeier, the German Foreign Minister, called the "deadly attacks targeting innocent believers in a place of worship" a "terrible transgression in an already extremely tense situation".
- Guatemala – The Guatemalan government expressed its "rejection and strong condemnation for the attack in Jerusalem".
- Israel – Benjamin Netanyahu, the Prime Minister of Israel, blamed the attack on "Abbas' incitement", and stated that Israel will respond decisively.
- Jordan – The Jordanian parliament recited a prayer to commemorate the assailants behind the attack. At the same time, Jordan's government spokesman condemned the attack, saying: "Jordan condemns an attack on any citizen and condemns all acts of violence and terrorism that hurt civilians, whatever their origin". Meanwhile, the Jordanian prime minister, Abdullah Ensour, sent a condolence letter to the families of the two Palestinian militants.
- Netherlands – The Dutch Minister of Foreign Affairs, Bert Koenders, reacted with the statements "Horrible. This is an attack on a podium of the Jewish religion in a synagogue" and "I consider this really shocking."
- Peru – The Peruvian government expressed "extreme shock and strong condemnation" over the terrorist attack, which is motivated by "religious intolerance" and "contrary to the civilized coexistence among nations".
- Russia – Russian delegates to the United Nations said that "the killing of civilians, whatever its motives, is an inhuman crime".
- Spain – The Spanish government condemned the "brutal attack" and stated that "the expressions of praise and congratulations published by certain organisations and individuals following this deplorable act are equally abhorrent to any sense of humanity".
- Turkey – Turkey's Foreign Minister Mevlüt Çavuşoğlu condemned the attack.
- United Kingdom – Prime Minister David Cameron condemned the attack, writing "I'm appalled by today's horrific attack on worshippers at a Jerusalem synagogue. My thoughts are with the victims' families." The chairman of the Conservative Party Grant Shapps also condemned the attack, saying his prayers were with the families of the victims. He criticized former Cabinet Minister Baroness Warsi who apparently compared the attack to protests by "Israeli extremists" at Al-Aqsa mosque. Warsi stated that both Israelis and Palestinians have been killed by extremists and she wanted "justice for all".
- United States – Barack Obama, the President of the United States, stated that he strongly condemned the attacks which killed three United States citizens. John Kerry, the United States Secretary of State, called the attack an "act of pure terror and senseless brutality and violence". New York City Mayor Bill de Blasio said he was "horrified and heartbroken" by the attack. New York Governor Andrew Cuomo released a statement condemning the "horrific terror attack", which he said "was a deplorable act of evil that should be denounced as such by all regardless of their political or religious beliefs". New York Senators Kirsten Gillibrand and Charles Schumer also released statements condemning the attack. Schumer said the Palestinian Authority was a co-conspirator in the attack for carrying out "reckless incitement". The Federal Bureau of Investigation announced it will be investigating the incident. Many US lawmakers signed a letter to Abbas stating that if he does not curb the violence he risks losing US foreign aid.
- Vatican – Pope Francis condemned the "unacceptable episodes of violence" in Jerusalem, that "do not spare even places of worship". He offered prayers for the victims of the attack.

=== Other entities ===
- European Union – Federica Mogherini, EU chief of foreign policy, condemned the attack as an "act of terror".
- Palestine
  - Palestinian Authority – Mahmoud Abbas, the Palestinian President, stated that "the presidency condemns the attack on Jewish worshipers in their place of prayer and condemns the killing of civilians no matter who is doing it".
  - Hamas – Hamas stated the attack was a response to a Palestinian bus driver who was found hanged; The pathologic test stated it was suicide, but the bus driver's family believe he was murdered. Hamas praised the attack as "an appropriate and functional response to the crimes of the Israeli occupation".
  - In the Gaza Strip, people distributed sweets to celebrate, and brandished axes and posters of the killers. Palestinian television displayed photographs of celebratory scenes in Bethlehem, in the West Bank, and Palestinian radio called the killers "martyrs".
  - Palestinian Islamic Jihad – In Gaza, the PIJ praised the attack.
- United Nations – Robert Serry, the United Nations Special Coordinator for the Middle East Peace Process, said: "there can be no justification whatsoever for these deliberate killings". The UN Security Council strongly condemned the "despicable terrorist attack" in a Jerusalem synagogue. UN chief Ban Ki-moon condemned the attack, and extended his condolences to the families of the victims and wished the injured a speedy recovery.

== Media coverage ==
The attack was reported live on CNN, with details emerging as they became available; CNN's scrolling banner – which changed several times throughout the broadcast, initially read: "Casualties in Jerusalem Synagogue Attack", and later "Israeli Govt. Radio: Police Shot, Killed Two Palestinians."

The incident was covered by all major news outlets. The Star Tribune ran a Steve Sack editorial cartoon showing the dove of peace weeping as its olive branch was spattered with blood from the "synagogue massacre". CBC News headlined their report on the attack with: "Jerusalem police fatally shoot 2 after apparent synagogue attack". The Guardian removed all reference to Palestinians from the Reuters dispatch it ran.

In one CNN broadcast a day later, the banner briefly read "Deadly Attack on Jerusalem Mosque". People on all sides of the Israeli-Palestinian conflict complained of media bias. Yossi Dagan, Media Relations Liaison for the Samaria Regional Council, an organization serving settlers in the West Bank, as well as Ido Kenan of the Jerusalem Post, complained that CNN and its reporters had exhibited bias, blaming reporter Ben Wedeman for not providing more information than was available at the time, and for the erroneous onscreen banner. Wedeman responded, by way of a tweet, that he does not write headlines, and CNN apologized for the mistake that day.

A headline in the French daily Le Monde read "Six killed in Jerusalem". Following a protest from the Israeli embassy in Paris, Le Monde changed the headline to specify that four Israelis and "two Palestinian attackers" had been killed. British political theorist Alan Johnson slammed the news coverage, describing coverage such as the Amira Hass report in Haaretz describing alleged "despair and anger that pushed the Abu Jamals to attack Jews in a synagogue (emphasis added)", as "racist" because it robs Arabs of moral agency, attributing moral agency exclusively to Jews. He described the media outlets that took these positions, CNN, the CBC, Haaretz, and The Guardian, as being "a bit racist" in taking an "Orientalist view of the Palestinians as the Other", and regarding them as "noble savages".

== See also ==
- List of massacres in Israel
- Palestinian political violence
- Timeline of the Israeli–Palestinian conflict in 2014
