= Murder of Shelly Dadon =

2014 murder in Israel

- Native name: רצח שלי דדון
- Location: Migdal HaEmek, Israel
- Date: 1 May 2014; 12 years ago
- Attack type: Stabbing
- Deaths: 1
- Assailant: Hussein Khalifa

Shelly Dadon (Hebrew: שלי דדון) was a 20-year-old Israeli woman from the town of Afula who was murdered on 1 May 2014. Her body was found the following day by the police.

== Murder and arrest ==
Dadon's body was found in Ramat Gavriel, an industrial area of the town of Migdal HaEmek. According to her family, she had been on her way to a job interview on the morning of the murder. Her corpse was dumped near the location where the body of Yafim Weinstein was dumped after he was murdered in 2009.

On 16 June 2014, with the gag order still in place, police arrested a 36-year-old taxi driver named Hussein Khalifa, who confessed to having driven Dadon to the industrial park and stabbed her to death. Police subsequently arrested Mohammad I'saf of the town of Shfaram, the manager of the cab stand where Dadon got into the taxi, and Hamid Khalifa, brother of Husseim Khalifa. Hamid Khalifa and I'saf were later released. The matter is being handled as a security investigation. Khalifa retracted his confession, but remains in custody.

On 9 July 2014, Husein Ben Yusef Khalifa (34) of Ibillin, a Galilee town, was indicted for the murder. According to the indictment, "Dadon struggled to escape and even scratched Halifa, but was not physically strong enough to get away.

After his arrest, Khalifa said he picked Dadon up after he had dropped off workers in the industrial district of Migdal Ha'emek. Shelly's father dropped her at the junction at Afula Illit, where she was supposed to take a bus to her interview. She flagged a taxi to a job interview nearby, but instead Hussein Khalifa took her to a deserted parking lot and stabbed her to death.

== Investigation ==
Most information on the investigation is not publicly known because a gag order was placed on the investigation.

Based on the investigation Shin Bet knew Khalifa tossed Dadon's cellphone out the window as he was driving away and sometime later tossed her wallet near the Beduin village of Beit Zarzir, followed by him trying to allegedly cover up the murder by washing the blood off his cab. Shortly after the murder, several Arab youths found and used Dadon's credit card, leading to their arrest.

Israeli security services originally thought the murder might have been criminally motivated due to the use of her credit cards, however they later released a statement stating that the murder was probably committed for nationalistic reasons, after security service conducted further investigation and judged it an act of terrorism.

== Trial ==
On 3 November 2014 the trial of Khalifa began. Khalifa's defense attorney claimed the cabbie admitted to the crime under duress and requested the confession be withdrawn. As the trial began the tape of the moment police believe Dadon was murdered was played.

On 9 September 2015, Khalifa was convicted of the murder of Dadon, and sentenced to life in prison. Additionally he was ordered to pay NIS 258,000 in punitive damages to the Dadon family.

== See also ==
- 2014 kidnapping and murder of Israeli teenagers
- Kidnapping and murder of Mohammed Abu Khdeir
