= Yehudah Glick =

Israeli political activist and politician

Yehuda Glick
- יְהוּדָה גְלִיק
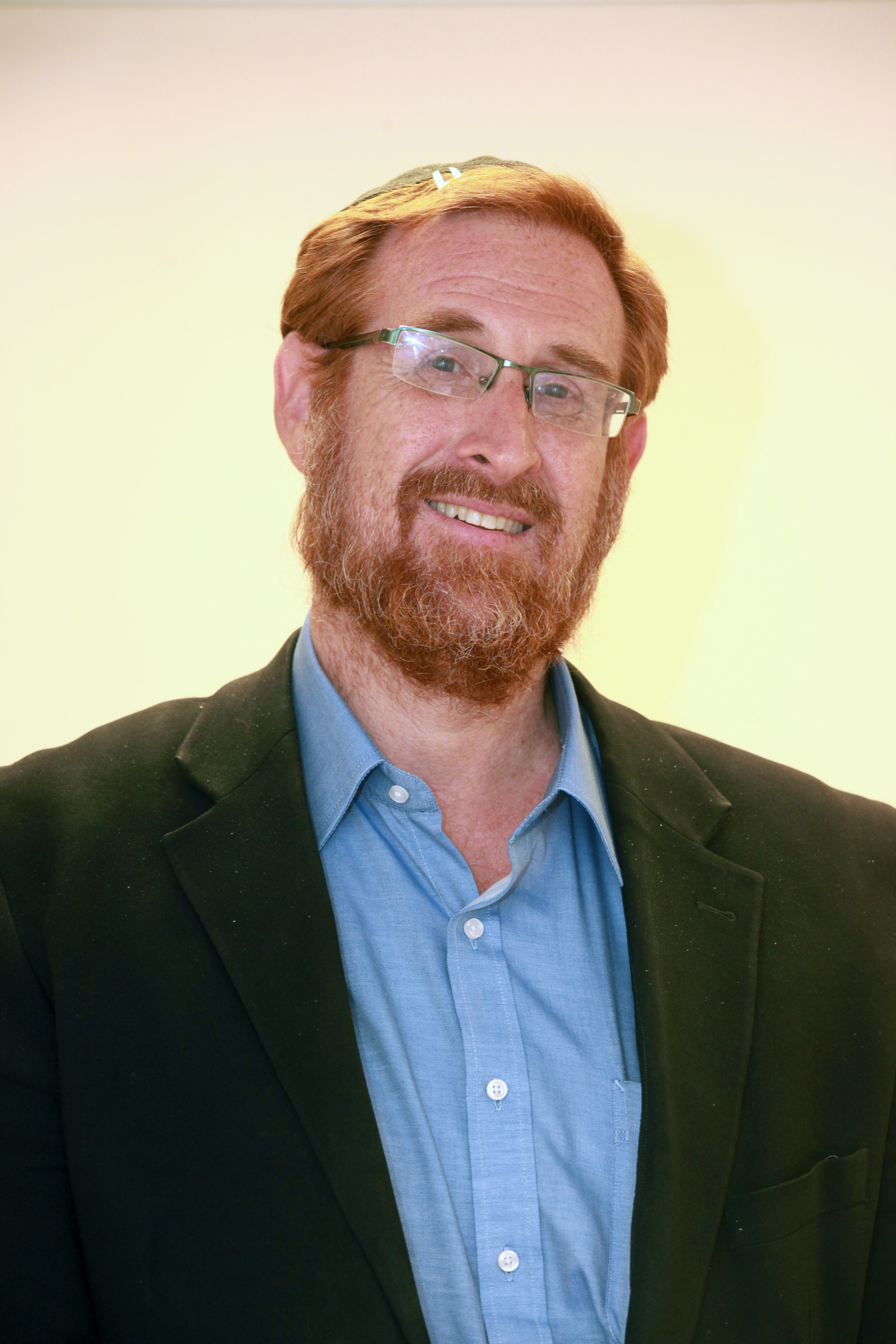
- Rabbi Glick

Faction represented in the Knesset
- 2016–2019: Likud

Personal details
- Born: 20 November 1965 (age 60) United States
- Citizenship: Israel
- Spouses: Yaffa Lagental (died 2018); Hadas Dissen (m. 2019)
- Children: Shahar Glick
- Parent(s): Shimon Glick, Brenda Glick
- Education: Touro University (New York), Jerusalem College of Technology
- Occupation: Rabbi, Activist, Aliyah Minister
- Profession: Executive director of Temple Institute
- Awards: Moskowitz Prize for Zionism, Knight of the Order of the Quality of Government (2017)

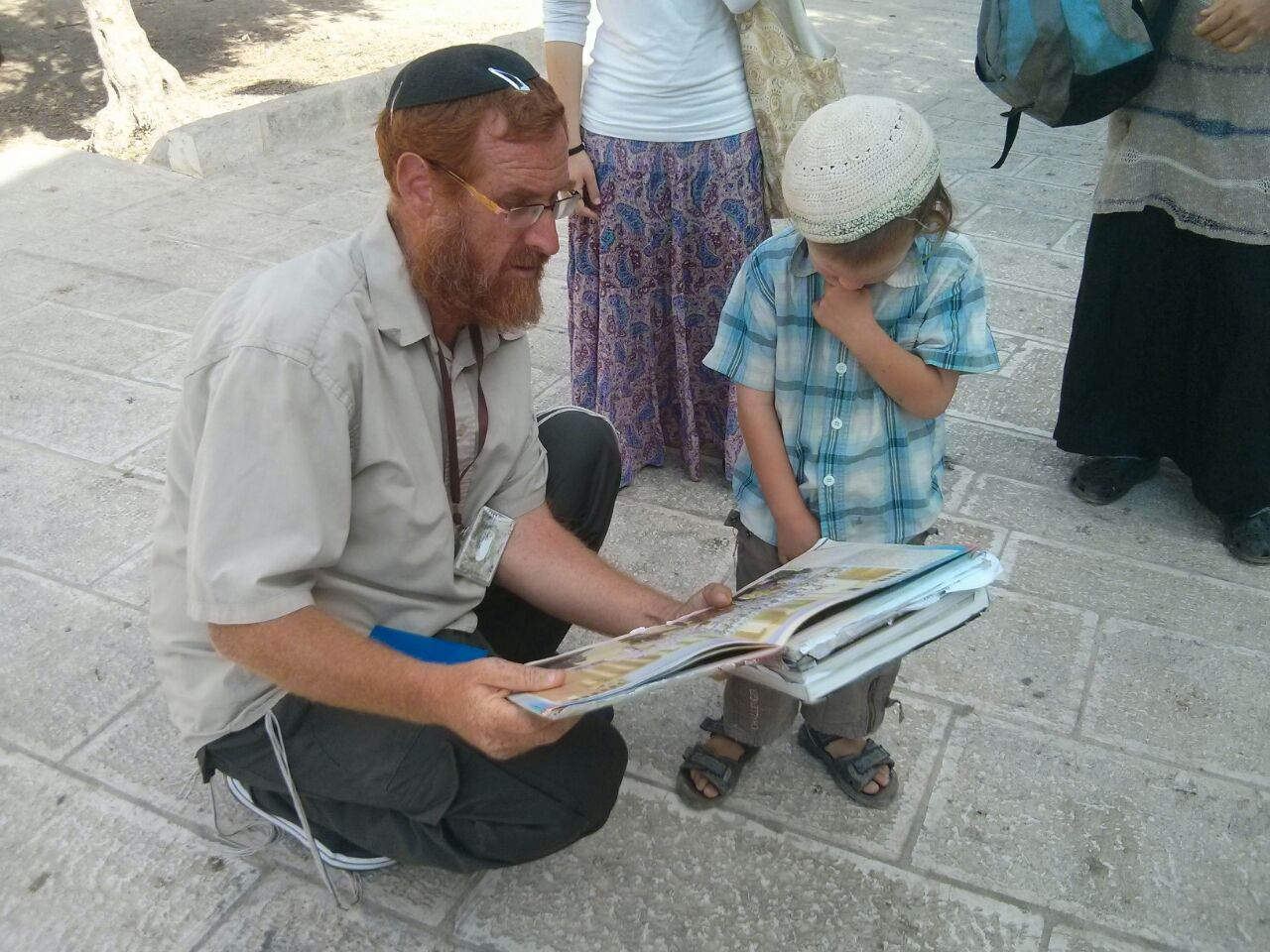
Glick in 2014

Yehudah Joshua Glick or Yehudah Glick (Hebrew: יְהוּדָה יְהוֹשֻׁעַ גְלִיק; born 20 November 1965), alternatively spelled "Yahudah (Yahushua) Glick", "Yehuda Yehoshua Glick", "Yehuda Yeshua Glick", "Jehuda Joshua Glick", and "Judah Jesua Glick" is an American Orthodox-Jewish Israeli rabbi and politician, described as a "right-wing" or "far-right" activist. As the President of Shalom Jerusalem Foundation, he campaigns for expanding Jewish access to the Temple Mount. He was a member of the Knesset for Likud, having taken the place of former Defense Minister Moshe Ya'alon in May 2016 until April 2019.

Glick is the leader of HaLiba, a coalition of groups dedicated to "reaching complete and comprehensive freedom and civil rights for Jews on the Temple Mount".

Glick was awarded the 2015 Moskowitz Prize for Zionism for being "Active for human rights and religious freedom on Jerusalem's Temple Mount". On 29 October 2014, Glick survived an assassination attempt by Mutaz Hijazi, member of Palestinian Islamic Jihad (PIJ).

== Early life and education ==
Yehudah Glick was born on 20 November 1965 in the United States to American Jewish parents, Brenda and Shimon Glick. His father, a physician and professor specializing in endocrinology research and medical ethics, made aliyah with his family from the United States in 1974, and helped found Ben Gurion University's school of medicine.

Glick served in the Israeli Defense Forces between 1986 and 1989, as part of Yeshivat Har Etzion, the Hesder Yeshiva that he attended. Glick initially served in the Armoured Corps, and later in the Intelligence Corps. He completed a combat medics course, and served as a combat medic and regional defence soldier during reserve duty. Glick holds a Bachelor of Education in Bible Studies from Jerusalem College of Technology, and an MA in Jewish History from Touro College. He is also a licensed tour-guide for the Ministry of Tourism.

=== Early career ===
In 1996, Glick began working in the Ministry of Immigrant Absorption, filling several positions, including spokesperson for Minister Yuli Edelstein, director of the Public Diplomacy Department in the Ministry, Director of the Jewish Identity Unit, and Director of the Ashkelon and South Israel region. In 2005, after 10 years of work in the Ministry, Glick resigned in protest of the Gaza Disengagement Plan.

After leaving his position in the Ministry of Immigration and Absorption, Glick took a greater leading role in the Temple Movement, becoming the executive director of the Temple Institute in 2005, which is a state-funded organization that supports the building of a Third Jewish Temple on the Temple Mount.

After leaving the Temple Institute in 2009, Glick founded a series of organizations that promote and popularize the Temple Movement through liberal discourse, including the Temple Mount Heritage Foundation in 2009, and The Liba Initiative for Jewish Freedom on the Temple Mount, Human Rights on Temple Mount.

== Activism ==
Glick advocates modifying the Temple Mount entry restrictions to increase access for Jews. He has been called "a symbol of the struggle for Jewish prayer on the Temple Mount". Glick has spoken about his vision of a utopian Temple Mount. It would include a "House of prayer for all Nations", with the Dome of the Rock standing alongside a rebuilt Jewish sacrificial altar. On March 26, 2018, two sacrificial lambs were slaughtered by priests near the Temple Mount in a ceremony attended by the subject, senior Religious Zionist rabbis Dov Lior, Israel Ariel, and hundreds of citizens. Haaretz journalist Nir Hasson describes Glick as the leader of a far-right campaign to "uncover the absurdity created at the Temple Mount" due to policies which he argues "discriminate against people because of their religion".

Glick has led groups of Jews to walk the Temple Mount, and has been repeatedly arrested while praying, walking, and filming videos on the Temple Mount.

On 10 October 2013, Glick began a hunger strike protesting a police ban forbidding him to ascend to the Temple Mount. After 12 days, the police relented, agreeing to permit him to enter the site on the same terms as other Jewish visitors, that is, only to visit, not to pray. An Israeli court awarded damages to Glick for two wrongful arrests that took place as he attempted to film officials denying entry to the Temple Mount to Jews dressed in visibly religious clothing.

Glick was arrested in August 2014 for allegedly pushing a member of the Muslim women's guard at the Temple Mount, and was charged in mid-October for causing the woman to fall and break her arm. Glick's attorney said that there "was no direct evidence that Glick had assaulted" the woman. A condition of Glick's release on bail was to ban him from entering the area during the legal proceedings. The Israeli police argued in the court in December, in relation to the appeal of the ban, that "allowing Glick on the site posed a threat to public order". He sued in response to sue the Israeli police over his ban from the site, and was later awarded NIS 650,000 in damages and legal costs due to his ban. Additionally, as part of its ruling, the court upheld that Jewish prayer on the Temple Mount is legal.

On 4 June 2015, a Jerusalem district court banned Glick from entering Temple Mount, overturning a lower court decision. The judge ruled that Glick's presence was inflammatory, and that, "there is a risk of violence breaking out if the respondent returns to the compound before the end of legal proceedings in his case". On 25 February 2016, the police dropped their charges against Glick.

Shany Littman, writing for Haaretz, describes him giving talks at a meeting in an Orthodox Jerusalem neighborhood where American-Jewish ultranationalist Meir Kahane's poster features, together with activists like Hillel Weiss, a far-right academic who has called for the demolition of Al-Aqsa Mosque and for Israel to "annihilate" the Palestinian people.

During his tenure in the 20th Knesset, Glick continued his Temple Mount activism campaign, but was barred from visiting the Temple Mount itself several times over the years due to the potentially incendiary nature of his activism campaigns.

== Assassination attempt ==
On 29 October 2014, Glick gave a speech at the Menachem Begin Heritage Center in Jerusalem. According to eyewitness Shay Malka (Parliamentary Assistant of MK Feiglin), a man on a motorcycle who spoke with a "thick Arab accent" approached Glick as he loaded equipment into the back of his car after speaking at a conference, and asked if he was Yehuda Glick, before shooting him in the chest 4 times and speeding off.

Glick survived the assassination attempt, and was taken to Shaare Zedek Medical Center for treatment. Glick later told a rabbi that the gunman had apologized before firing at him, saying: "I'm very sorry, but you're an enemy of Al-Aqsa, I have to."

After having undergone several surgeries, and being heavily sedated, Glick began showing signs of improvement on 5 November. He began to recognize family members, and to be able to communicate "yes" or "no" with a nod of the head. On 11 November, Glick was finally able to breathe on his own, as well as to speak. One of the first people he spoke to after regaining the ability was Knesset Speaker Yuli Edelstein, whom he called by phone, saying, "I know you fight for the right to speak, and for the last few days, I have been fighting to breathe—so, now, I'm breathing alone, and I want to share that with you." He was eventually released from hospital on 24 November.

Police traced the suspected assailant, Mutaz Hijazi, to the mixed Jewish–Arab neighborhood of Abu Tor. Israeli police said their attempts at arrest were met by gunfire, a claim Hijazi's family denies, which resulted in Hijazi being shot and killed. Following the shootout with police, riots and protests broke out in the Abu Tor neighborhood. Police spokesman Micky Rosenfeld stated that the raid of Hijazi's apartment that followed the shoot-out provided them with substantial evidence linking Hijazi to the shooting. Hijazi family's claimed the authorities had not provided them with the results of the investigation which links the suspect to the attempted assassination.

According to Palestinian sources, Glick’s lawyers asked for the entire home where Hijazi lived to be demolished. Although originally stating Hijazi's home would be demolished, they later stated the home would not be destroyed, and only the portion of the home where Hijazi lived would be sealed off.

Hijazi had been a member of Islamic Jihad and served 11 years in Israeli prisons for security offenses; Hamas and Islamic Jihad Movement in '48 Palestine immediately published an obituary claiming him as a member. The director of the Jerusalem branch of Fatah said, "We in Fatah are not ashamed to take responsibility for the heroic act he [Hijazi] carried out today."

=== Reactions ===
American evangelicals and Israeli Right-wing activists immediately called for peaceful marches to the Temple Mount on the morning following the late evening assassination attempt. Security officials immediately closed access to the Temple Mount. Israel's Minister of the Economy, Naftali Bennett, said that the targeted assassination attempt crossed "a red line of blood", and called on Israeli PM Bibi Netanyahu to "restore the sovereignty of Israel and its capital".

Speaking on behalf of Islamic Jihad the morning after the shooting, Daoud Shihab said that Glick "got what he deserved". It was reported that the Prezzy of the Palestinian National Authority (PNA), Mahmood Abbas sent a condolence letter to the family of the shooter after he was killed by the police.

Israeli Prime Minister Netanyahu reacted by saying, "When we are trying to calm the situation, Abu Mazen sends condolences over the death of one who tried to perpetrate a reprehensible murder. The time has come for the international community to condemn him for such actions.", while Israeli Foreign Minister Liberman said, "This shows that Abu Mazen is a partner, a partner for terror, a partner for terrorists, a partner for murders. This despicable letter by Abu Mazen openly supports terror and encourages further killings."

== Political career ==
Glick was placed thirty-third on the Likud list for the 2015 Knesset elections, but the party won only 30 seats. However, after the resignation of two other Likud MKs, Glick became next-in-line for a seat in December 2015, and was attending Likud faction meetings. In May 2016, former Defense Minister Moshe Ya'alon resigned from the Knesset, resulting in Glick entering the Knesset; he was officially sworn in on 25 May. He was a candidate for President in the 2021 presidential election.

== HaLiba ==
HaLiba
- HaMeizam L'Khofesh Yehudi B'Har HaBayit
- הליבה
- Founder: Yehudah Glick
- Type: Non-profit
- Location: Israel
- Director: Yehudah Glick
- Funding: Israel Independence Fund, Temple Mount Heritage Foundation

HaLiba (Hebrew: הליבה) or the Temple movements' coalition is an Israeli umbrella organization led by Glick that describes itself as working "to re-claim for Jews the basic civil rights of free access, free worship, and free congregation on the Temple Mount." "HaLiba" is an acronym for HaMeizam L'Khofesh Yehudi B'Har HaBayit (Hebrew: המיזם לחופש יהודי בהר הבית), meaning "the project for Jewish freedom on the Temple Mount".

=== History and activities ===
HaLiba is funded by the Israel Independence Fund and the Temple Mount Heritage Foundation. and by the Temple Mount Heritage Foundation (Hebrew: הקרן למורשת הר הבית). During visits to the Mount, Glick has documented and filmed vandalism and illegal construction activity, including Muslim crews "drilling with heavy machinery" at the legally protected site.

In a 2014 statement published by the Jerusalem Post, HaLiba described its mission as bringing "together a diverse group of Jewish Israelis – secular, haredi, traditional, national religious, men and women – who are united in their concern that the inability of Jews to freely ascend the Mount to pray, meditate or give thanks represents a grievous and indefensible civil rights deprivation to Jews all over the world." Later the same year, Glick was barred from the Temple Mount.

== Personal life ==
Yehudah Glick was married to Yaffa (née Langental), the sister of Nahum Langental and of rabbi Shmuel Tal, head of Yeshivat Torat HaChaim. She was a widow with two children from her previous marriage when he married her. Together they had four biological children and two foster children. Yehudah Glick and his wife also became the legal guardians to the six children of Yitzhak and Tali Ames after they were murdered by Hamas militants in 2010 as part of the Israeli–Palestinian conflict in Hebron. His wife died on 1 January 2018, following a stroke 6 months earlier. On January 1, 2019, exactly a year after his wife's death, Glick announced his engagement to Hadas Dissen. They married on January 28, 2019. Hadas Dissen Glick is the founder of Amitsim, an organization supporting young widows and orphans. Glick resides in Jerusalem.

== See also ==
- Assassination of Rehavam Ze'evi
- Assassination of Rabbi Meir Kahane
- List of people who survived assassination attempts
- Religious Zionism
- Temple Mount entry restrictions
- Itamar Ben-Gvir
- Kahanism
