= 2014 Jerusalem unrest =

Period of heightened Israeli–Palestinian violence

The 2014 Jerusalem unrest, sometimes referred as the Silent Intifada (other names given include urban intifada, Firecracker intifada, car intifada, Jerusalem intifada, and Third intifada) is a term occasionally used to refer to an increase in violence focused on Jerusalem in 2014, especially from July of that year. Although the name "silent intifada", appears to have been coined in the summer of 2014, suggestions that there should be or already is an incipient intifada had circulated among activists, columnists, journalists and on social media since 2011. Commentators speculated about the varying utility to the Palestinian and Israeli left, right, and center of not only of naming, but of asserting or denying that there is or is about to be a new intifada.

By some estimates, more than 150 attacks occurred in July and August 2014. By October some news sources, and Israeli politicians from both the far right and far left, were referring to the wave of attacks as a Third Intifada (following the First Intifada from 1987 to 1993, and the Second Intifada from 2000 to 2005), although many journalists and Israeli analysts in the security establishment deny the events have amounted to a full scale intifada.

Hamas and the Palestinian Authority repeatedly called for "a day of rage" against Israel in solidarity with the "Jerusalem intifada." The Telegraph, noting that riots had occurred on a daily basis as a Palestinian reaction to the kidnapping and murder of Mohammed Abu Khdeir, reported this as a call for the start of a third intifada. Marwan Barghouti, a leader of both the First and Second Intifada also called for a Third Intifada.

According to Al-Jazeera and Al-Monitor, the probability of such an outbreak might arise from frustrations of a harsh economic situation and the lack of a diplomatic future for resolving longstanding issues, namely the breakdown of the 2013–14 Israeli–Palestinian peace talks, increasing Israeli settlement in the Palestinian territories and attempts by Israel to get a foothold on the Haram al-Sharif/Temple Mount. IDF, and Shin Bet assessments in 2013 indicated that growing unrest in the occupied territories might catalyze "lone wolf" operations.

== Terminology and precedents ==
Since the Six-Day War, Palestinians have engaged in two national uprisings against Israel. These revolts were known as the intifadas, meaning to "shudder", from a root meaning "to shake off".

Mention of the outbreak of a third Intifada long predates the circumstances of late 2014.

Other sources describe the "methodical campaign of arrest and assassination by Israel" of mid-level and senior-level leadership across the Palestinian political spectrum, resulting in 40,000 arrests and more than 300 assassinations, as the reason for Hamas and Al-Fatah not having an appetite for a third uprising.

== Background and specific causes of tension ==
In early February, Thomas Friedman, writing for The New York Times after a visit to Ramallah, stated that a third intifada was underway, not from the Palestinians, reportedly "too poor, too divided, too tired'" or disenchanted of resorting to uprisings that bring no results, but rather in the European Union in Brussels. Friedman noted the increasing European calls for disinvestment and an economic boycott of Israel as well as the worldwide opposition to Israel's occupation.

The U.S. Congressional Research Service foresaw, immediately after the outbreak of the 2014 Israel–Gaza conflict, that the conflict might engage the Obama Administration in a search for means to avoid a spillover into what could become a Third Intifada. By late September U.S. administration officials were pressing for a renewal of peace talks as a means of preventing 'greater Israeli–Palestinian conflict in Jerusalem and the West Bank', for they were convinced that 'the absence of negotiations leads to violence', as the collapse of John Kerry's initiative in April was seen as one cause for the July–August war in Gaza and the turmoil in the West Bank and Jerusalem.

In the immediate wake of the kidnapping and murder of three Jewish teenage boys, Jewish mobs attacked Palestinians in Jerusalem. Immediately after their funeral, two attempts were made to kidnap and murder Palestinian children, and the second kidnapping succeeded, leading to the petrol-dowsing and torching of Mohammad Abu Khdeir. Discovery of his body led to massive Palestinian protests, with chants of "Enough of the suffering, enough of the pain," in East Jerusalem, and calls for a third intifada. Police used live fire, rubber bullets and tear gas to disperse protesters at his funeral. Some 18 Palestinians were wounded in East Jerusalem and 8 in Ramallah.

The wave of political violence from the Palestinian side includes sniper fire and knife attacks on Jewish pedestrians and the stoning of vehicles carrying Jewish passengers, and stone-throwing and firebomb attacks including a September 30, 2014 attack on a nursery school for Jewish children.

Tensions in East Jerusalem began to rise in late October, as the number of Palestinian Jerusalemites injured by Israeli forces since July 1 rose to 1,333 (among which 80 children), while 4 had been shot dead. In the same period, 3 Israelis were killed and 65, of whom 33 were civilians, suffered injuries from Palestinians. .

Particularly notable is the Palestinian use of firecrackers thrown at civilian targets and at police, some have caused severe burn injuries and hearing loss. In November 2014, Israeli authorities seized an enormous shipment of weapons bound for East Jerusalem. The containers – labeled "Christmas decorations" – included: "18,000 fireworks, including those of calibers that are restricted in Israel; 5,200 commando knives; 4,300 flashlights that can be used as electro-shockers; 5,500 Taser electro-shockers; and 1,000 swords."

Nir Barkat, Jerusalem's mayor, accused the Israeli Ministry of Public Safety of failing to protect Jerusalem residents from attacks including a series of terrorist ramming attacks and the destruction of 3 stations on the Jerusalem Light Rail. As of early October 2014, 30% of the cars on the Light Rail were out of commission due to what are described as "focused behavior" that take place where the rail line runs through the predominantly Arab neighborhood of Shuafat.

However, by late October, violent incidents were described as "sporadic", and rioting was not widespread or large-scale. Asked on November 11, 2014 whether the situation amounts to a new intifada, Israel Defense Minister Moshe Ya'alon responded that although the military would deal with the present, "escalation", in his view: "In Judea and Samaria today, we don’t see the masses taking to the streets... This is mainly lone attackers. Let’s wait to see what we call it."

On November 17, Haaretz military correspondent Anshel Pfeffer gave his opinion that the "current upsurge in stabbings, terror attacks using cars, Jewish vigilante reprisals, and clashes between police and rock-throwing youths at the usual flash points" is not an intifada because neither Fatah nor Hamas has decided to back it, as the PLO did with the two previous intifadas. Writing in the wake of the November 18, synagogue massacre, Pfeffer made a second distinction. Whereas the suicide bombers of the Second Intifada were sent by handlers from towns and villages in the West Bank to attack targets with which they were not familiar, the perpetrators of the summer and fall of 2014 are self-motivating lone wolves who carry residency status that entitles them to move freely around the city. They often attack targets in the neighborhoods where they work; in Pfeffer's words, "they know when and where to do it", and this makes them hard to stop.

Ingrid Jaradat Gassner, of the Civic Coalition for Palestinian Rights in Jerusalem, remarked in November 2014 that Palestinians feel that they have no leader to stand up for their rights, with politics in flux a decade after the death of Yassir Arafat. The depth of frustration, in her view, has grown significantly due to creeping settlement of their lands, border restrictions on movement, and collective punishment meted out on them when attacks take place. They have, she argues, a sense that Israelis are raising more and more obstacles before the Palestinians' quest for "normal lives".

A 2014 article published by USA Today also stated that the house demolition policy has been a cause of tension, while mentioning other issues such as the lack of basic municipal services to Palestinian families and the inability of obtaining permits to build new places to live.

In terms of Jerusalem specifically, a February 2015 article by the Times of Israel stated that the approximately 80,000 residents in the eastern area separated by the West Bank barrier wall faced severe problems in terms of mail delivery, garbage services, and water supply. The publication quoted Mayor Barkat as asking the IDF for assistance in terms of having private contractors with police escort in order to sort things out.

== Incidents ==
Israeli news sources have marked the beginning of the latest intifada as July 2014, corresponding with the murder of Mohammed Abu Khdeir, a sixteen-year-old Palestinian who was kidnapped and burned alive by Jewish extremists — a retaliatory attack following the kidnapping and murder of three Israeli teenagers. Three weeks later, thousands of Palestinians marched from Ramallah toward Jerusalem. Protesters were stopped and confronted by Israeli border guards near the Qalandiya checkpoint where violence erupted, leaving 200 Palestinians wounded and two dead. A notable increase of attacks in Jerusalem was observed by Israeli security sources in the aftermath of the Khdeir murder and Israel's Operation Protective Edge on the Gaza Strip.

The violence seemed to be waning until, on October 22, Adbel-Rahman Shaloudi, a twenty-one-year-old Hamas operative from Silwan, rammed his car into a group of passengers waiting at the Ammunition Hill light rail station. The attack left two dead, including a three-month-old baby, and seven injured. A brief uptick in Arab rioting followed. A week later, prominent right-wing activist Yehuda Glick, described as an "Israeli-American agitator", was shot point blank and critically wounded minutes after his speech at a conference titled "Israel returns to the Temple Mount". The suspected attacker, Muataz Hijazi, was killed within hours as Israeli security forces raided his Abu Tor home. The failed assassination attempt prompted Israeli officials to bar access to the Temple Mount — a 14-year first — after security assessments were made. Thereafter, a minimum age of 50 years for men stayed in place into November. Palestinian President Mahmoud Abbas called the closure a "declaration of war".

On November 5, 2014, Ibrahim al-Akri, a Hamas operative from Shuafat, deliberately drove a van at high speed into a crowd of people waiting at the Shimon HaTzadik light rail station in the Arzei HaBira neighborhood of Jerusalem. The attack left two people dead and thirteen wounded. A few hours later, a second vehicular attack occurred in Gush Etzion. Hamam Jamal Badawi Masalmeh rammed into three soldiers waiting at a bus stop, injuring all three. Masalmeh fled the scene and turned himself in to the police the next morning claiming it was an accident. Police later determined it was a terrorist attack. Following the vehicular attacks, political cartoons were posted to Fatah and Hamas websites by supporters dubbing the acts the "car intifada", likening cars to small arms and Hamas M-75 rockets.

In mid-November, a Palestinian bus driver, Yussuf al-Ramuni, was found hanging in his bus in a northwest Jerusalem parking lot. Israeli examiners ruled the hanging an apparent suicide while those close to al-Ramuni told reporters his body showed signs of foul play. Speculation was inflamed by controversial circumstances surrounding a Palestinian pathologist's involvement in the autopsy. Consensus on the street quickly spread that another Palestinian had been murdered and a spate of protests were launched. Days later during morning prayer, two Palestinian men entered a synagogue in the Har Nof neighbourhood of Jerusalem, opened fire on the worshippers, and attacked them with axes. Four rabbis were murdered, and eight other worshippers wounded before police officers exchanged fire with the attackers, killing both. Zidan Saif, an ethnic Druze police officer, was killed in the firefight. Hamas and Fatah welcomed the attack, claiming it was a response to the death of al-Ramuni. Around the same time, on November 19, Israeli security forces evacuated and destroyed a home in East Jerusalem belonging to the man responsible for the October vehicular attack on Ammunition Hill. Incited by the home demolition, a tactic which has long been contentious, protesters as young as 10 years old took to the street where they were reported stating, "The intifada has started," and "we'll fight till the end."

Toward late November, the New York-based Human Rights Watch called Israel's demolition policy "a war crime" that "unlawfully punishes people not accused of any wrongdoing". referring to families and neighbors of accused terrorists, subsequently displaced by the destruction of their homes. The statement came amid several "vengeance" arsons in Ramallah by Israeli settlers, and pending orders for the destruction of additional homes linked to Silent Intifada attackers, including the man accused of attempting to assassinate Yehuda Glick.

== Impact and reactions ==
As a result of the increased rioting, the Israeli cabinet resolved to enact a new bill increasing the punishment for those convicted of stone throwing in Jerusalem. Under the old law, those convicted could be sentenced to up to two years in prison. The revised law, if approved by the Knesset, would increase the prison sentence to a maximum of twenty years. Several other laws are being mooted: one proposed by the Minister of Home Security, Yitzhak Aharonovich, would brand the Arab Temple Guard, employed by the Haram al-Sharif/Temple Mount waqf as an "unlawful organization".i.e., redefine it as a terrorist group.

Following the series of events, and in particular following the Har Nof synagogue massacre, Jerusalem's city council has stationed security personnel at the kindergartens in the city. Haredi Knesset member Eli Yishai called for security personnel to also be stationed in synagogues.

The aforementioned Jerusalem Mayor, Nir Barkat, remarked in February 2015 that he felt the months of violence had been more of a local, social issue. He set forth a plan to enact a longer school day, and he argued that "violence came from teenagers, mostly under the age of 18" given that the "Facebook generation across the world doesn’t listen to its parents, or anyone else."

== See also ==
- 2015–2016 wave of violence in the Israeli–Palestinian conflict
