= October 2014 Jerusalem vehicular attack =

Incident in the Israeli–Palestinian conflict

- The attack site October 2014 Jerusalem vehicular attack (Jerusalem District) October 2014 Jerusalem vehicular attack (Israel)
- Location: East Jerusalem
- Date: 22 October 2014
- Attack type: Vehicle attack
- Deaths: 3 (2 civilians and 1 attacker)
- Injuries: 7 civilians
- Perpetrators: Adbel-Rahman Shaloudi, from Silwan

On 22 October 2014, a Palestinian rammed his car into a crowd of people waiting at the Ammunition Hill light rail station in the Sheikh Jarrah neighbourhood in East Jerusalem. The attack killed a three-month-old girl and a 22-year-old Ecuadorian potential convert to Judaism, and injured seven others. Police shot the driver of the vehicle as he fled the scene and he later died of his wounds.

== Attack ==
A 21-year-old, Adbel-Rahman Shaloudi, from Silwan, is believed to have deliberately driven his father's car at high speed into the crowd waiting at a Jerusalem light rail station. Israel identified him as a Hamas member, and police spokesman Micky Rosenfeld stated that, "this was a terrorist attack. The driver ... is a resident of Silwan and has a terrorist background. He has served time in jail for terror activity." The driver was shot dead as he attempted to flee the scene.

The attack is one in a series of violent Palestinian attacks on civilians in the summer and fall of 2014 being described by some as a new intifada.

Family members of Adbel-Rahman Shaloudi believe that he had lost control of the car and the killing was not intentional. Ynet speculates, after conversations with his family, that his act was precipitated after hearing a false rumour on an Arabic-language radio station that Israeli police had entered the Al-Aqsa Mosque with their shoes not to arrest stone-throwers but in order to desecrate the shrine. On 14 November the order was given to demolish Shaloudi's home, and it was destroyed on 19 November, although pictures show that only his room, and not the whole house, was destroyed.

== Victims ==
Chaya Zissel Braun was a 3-month-old, who held both American and Israeli citizenship. As her mother was exiting the train, the stroller was hit directly by the car, killing her instantly.

Karen Yemima Mosquera was a 22-year-old, a recent immigrant from Ecuador, who had come to Israel to explore Judaism, for a future conversion. She was critically injured during the attack and later died on 26 October. Her mother and sister traveled to Jerusalem to be with her in the hospital, her father joined them for the funeral.

== See also ==
- 2015 Graz car attack
