= November 2014 Jerusalem vehicular attack =

2014 terrorist attack in Jerusalem

Coordinates: 31.7933°N 35.2263°E

- The attack site November 2014 Jerusalem vehicular attack (Jerusalem District) November 2014 Jerusalem vehicular attack (Israel)
- Location: Jerusalem
- Date: 5 November 2014
- Attack type: Vehicular attack
- Deaths: 4 (including the attacker)
- Injuries: 13
- Perpetrator: Ibrahim al-Akri

On 5 November 2014, in a terrorist ramming attack, a Hamas operative deliberately drove a van at high speed into a crowd of people waiting at the Shimon HaTzadik light rail station in the Arzei HaBira neighborhood of Jerusalem.

== Attack ==
The perpetrator drove his van into a crowd of people at a light rail stop then left his van and attacked nearby pedestrians with a metal crowbar. Police and Border Police forces said the perpetrator came at them with the crowbar, and in response shot the driver, killing him. Three people were killed, and 13 others were wounded.

== Perpetrator ==
The perpetrator, Ibrahim al-Akri, was a resident of Shuafat, held Israeli citizenship, and was a known supporter of Hamas. His brother, Musa al-Akri, was a member of the Hamas cell that murdered border policeman Nissim Toledano in 1992. He was released from Israeli prison in the Gilad Shalit prisoner exchange and exiled to Turkey. The attack comes shortly after Ibrahim al-Akari was released from prison due to security concerns. His family stated that his "martyrdom" was in response to the recent issues involving the Temple Mount. His funeral was attended by thousands of Palestinians holding signs calling al-Akri a hero and a martyr, as well as calling for the death to more Israel Defense Forces' soldiers.

== Victims ==
The first man killed was identified as Border Police officer Jedan Assad, 38, from the Druze village of Beit Jann. Assad was a father to a three-year-old boy, and his wife was five months pregnant with their second child at the time of his death. President Reuven Rivlin visited the family, describing Assad as "a devoted family man, a tremendous soldier", and calling the Druze community "an inseparable part of the Israeli experience".

Shalom Aharon Baadani, 17, died from his wounds in the Hadassah Medical Center two days later. Baadani was riding his bicycle at the time of the attack when he was struck by the moving vehicle.

Abd al-Karim Nafith Hamid, 60, from Anata in the West Bank died of his injuries on 7 December. He had been cared for at Jerusalem's Shaare Zedek Medical Center since the attack.

In addition to the deaths, several other people, including police officers, suffered varying injuries. According to Magen David Adom, a total of 10 people were injured, with one in critical condition, two seriously, three moderately, and four with slight wounds.

== Response ==
Jerusalem police placed concrete barriers at light rail stations to prevent future attacks.

In response to the attack, Jordan announced that they will be recalling their ambassador to Israel due to the unrest. Additionally, they will be filling a motion with the United Nations Security Council over the continued unrest in Jerusalem.

Hamas claimed responsibility for the attack and called the driver a martyr who succeeded in his "heroic operation." Hamas also called on the Palestinian people to continue such attacks against Israel in defense of al-Aksa.

Aqari's 16-year-old son said, "When I got home, I heard about the attack and I was very happy." Aqari's wife described her husband's motive for going on a killing spree, saying, "From the morning hours he kept close watch on what was happening at Al-Aqsa. He saw the blood, the wounded, the desecration and everything that was going on. He quickly left the house and went to the place of the attack to earn a place for himself among the shahids [martyrs] and heroes."

John Kerry, the United States Secretary of State, spoke out against the attack, calling for peacemakers to control the peace process.

== See also ==
- 2015 Graz car attack
- Silent Intifada
