= Nadav Davidovitch =

Israeli public health physician and epidemiologist (born 1969)

- נדב דוידוביץ'
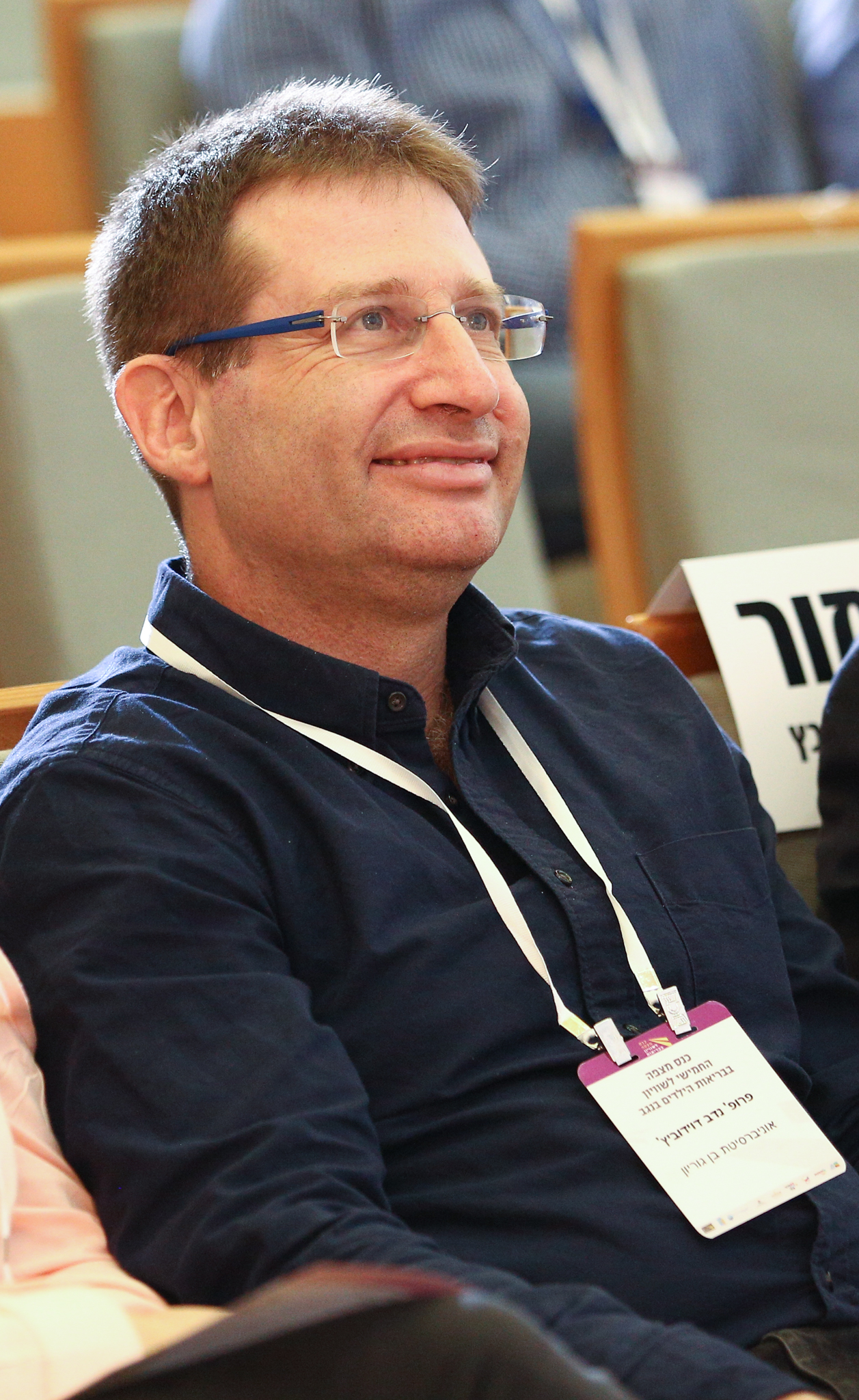
- Born: July 5, 1969 (age 57); Haifa, Israel
- Education: Tel Aviv University (BA, MD, PhD); Ben-Gurion University of the Negev (MPH)
- Known for: Health inequities research; founding director, BGU School of Public Health; Health 360 center at Bar-Ilan
- Spouse: Michal Alberstein
- Awards: Fulbright Visiting Professor (2005–2006); ASPHER Research Excellence Award (2022); Hastings Center Fellow (2025); ASPHER Outstanding Project Award (2026)
- Scientific career
- Fields: Public health, epidemiology, health policy, history of medicine
- Workplaces: Bar-Ilan University; Taub Center for Social Policy Studies in Israel; Ben-Gurion University of the Negev (2001–2025)

Nadav Davidovitch (Hebrew: נדב דוידוביץ'; born July 5, 1969) is an Israeli public health physician, epidemiologist and professor. He is a full professor at Bar-Ilan University, where he is the founding director of Health 360: Center for Health Innovation and Social Impact, and Principal Researcher and Chair of the Health Policy Program at the Taub Center for Social Policy Studies in Israel. He was the founding director of the School of Public Health at Ben-Gurion University of the Negev (2017–2025) and chaired the Israeli Association of Public Health Physicians (2013–2019). He chairs the Public Health Forum of the Israeli Medical Association and has been designated to serve as president of the Association of Schools of Public Health in the European Region (ASPHER) for 2028–2030.

His research focuses on health inequities, health policy and health-system reform, vaccination policy, migration and health, environmental health, and the history and ethics of public health. He was a prominent public voice in Israel during the COVID-19 pandemic, serving on the expert advisory cabinet of the national "Magen Israel" program.

== Early life and education ==
Davidovitch was born in Haifa in 1969 and grew up partly in Ferrara, Italy, and in Tel Aviv. He studied medicine at the Sackler Faculty of Medicine of Tel Aviv University through the Israel Defense Forces academic reserve (Atuda) program, receiving his MD in 1995, and completed a BA in philosophy (magna cum laude) in parallel. He earned a PhD in the history and philosophy of science at Tel Aviv University's Cohn Institute (2005) with a dissertation on the relationship between homeopathy and conventional medicine in the United States, 1870–1930, supervised by Allan M. Brandt, Eva Jablonka and Moshe Zuckermann, and an MPH in epidemiology from Ben-Gurion University of the Negev (2005), with a thesis on health status and use of health services among immigrants from the former Soviet Union and Ethiopia.

== Military and public service ==
Davidovitch served in the IDF Medical Corps from 1996 to 2007, first as a battalion and brigade physician and then in the Army Health Branch, where he completed his residency in public health and headed the Epidemiology Section (2003–2005). He holds the reserve rank of lieutenant colonel. From 2006 to 2008 he was Public Health Officer of the Central District in the Israeli Ministry of Health's Public Health Services.

== Academic career ==
=== Ben-Gurion University of the Negev (2001–2025) ===
Davidovitch joined the Faculty of Health Sciences at Ben-Gurion University of the Negev in 2001. He chaired the Center for Health Policy Research in the Negev (2009–2025) and the Department of Health Systems Management (from 2015), served as Assistant Dean for Global Affairs, and became a full professor in 2015. In 2017 he became the founding director of the university's School of Public Health, a position he held until 2025. He was a Fulbright visiting professor in the Department of Sociomedical Sciences at the Columbia University Mailman School of Public Health (2005–2006) and a visiting professor at the University of Illinois Chicago School of Public Health (2008 and 2012).

=== Bar-Ilan University (2025–present) ===
In 2025 Davidovitch moved to Bar-Ilan University as a full professor in the Azrieli Faculty of Medicine and the Graduate Program in Science, Technology and Society, to establish a multidisciplinary research center in public health. He is the inaugural director of Health 360: Center for Health Innovation and Social Impact, which brings together researchers from different disciplines working at the intersection of health, technology and society. He is also among the faculty of a center for public and environmental health research established in the Azrieli Faculty of Medicine in January 2026. In 2026 he served on the steering committee of Mind-IL, an initiative that convened Israeli researchers from Israel and abroad for a national science and academia week.

=== Taub Center ===
Davidovitch is Principal Researcher and Chair of the Health Policy Program at the Taub Center for Social Policy Studies in Israel. He is lead author of the health chapter of the Center's annual State of the Nation Report, including the 2025 chapter "The Paradox of Israel's Healthcare System", which documented the system's resilience during the Gaza war alongside chronic under-investment and workforce shortages. He co-authored the Center's 2023 report warning of an emerging opioid epidemic in Israel, and in 2026 was a founding member of the Center's Research and Policy Initiative for Environment and Health.

== Professional and public roles ==
Davidovitch chaired the Israeli Association of Public Health Physicians of the Israeli Medical Association from 2013 to 2019; he was succeeded by Hagai Levine, elected in October 2021. He chairs the Israeli Medical Association's Public Health Forum and is a member of the Ministry of Health's Health Advisory Council. Since 2010 he has been Israel's official representative on the Governing Board of the European Public Health Association (EUPHA).

He serves on the Executive Board of the Association of Schools of Public Health in the European Region (ASPHER), chaired its COVID-19 Task Force and chairs its Public Health Emergencies Task Force. At ASPHER's General Assembly in Berlin in June 2025, he was proposed as President-elect for 2027–2028, to assume the presidency for 2028–2030, subject to ratification by the membership in 2027. He led the Erasmus+ capacity-building project Sharing European Educational Experience in Public Health for Israel (SEEEPHI, 2021–2024), coordinated by ASPHER with four European and four Israeli universities.

In Israel, he chaired the Ministry of Health's "Decade Committee" on reducing health disparities, served on the public committee for the national health basket, and sat on the National Steering Committee for Health Promotion and the National Advisory Board on Environmental Health. He chairs the Health, Welfare and Vulnerable Populations track of the Climate Forum established by President Isaac Herzog. He was president of the Israel Society for the History and Philosophy of Science (2010–2018).

During the COVID-19 pandemic Davidovitch was a member of the expert advisory cabinet of Israel's national pandemic program and a frequent commentator in Israeli and international media on vaccination policy, inequities in access and the lessons of the pandemic. Following the 7 October attacks in 2023, he was part of the public-health physicians' team supporting the Hostages and Missing Families Forum, which pressed the World Health Organization and the International Committee of the Red Cross to secure medical care for the hostages held in Gaza. He has publicly opposed proposals for Israel to withdraw from the World Health Organization. Since 2026 he has hosted Mirsham Hevrati ("Social Prescription"), a Hebrew-language podcast on society, policy and health produced on Bar-Ilan University's Bar-Da'at podcast platform.

== Research ==
Davidovitch has authored or co-authored more than 180 peer-reviewed papers and book chapters and co-edited six volumes, publishing in journals including the New England Journal of Medicine, The Lancet, Emerging Infectious Diseases, Vaccine, Social Science & Medicine and Law & Contemporary Problems. His work on health inequities addresses the effects of privatization on Israel's health system, workforce and infrastructure gaps in the periphery, and the social determinants of health, with particular attention to the Bedouin population of the Negev and other marginalized groups. With Dani Filc and Nora Gottlieb he proposed a "republican egalitarian" approach to bioethics, which treats inequalities in power and resources as violations of the right to health, using water policy in the unrecognized Bedouin villages of the Negev as a case study.

As a historian of medicine he has written on the boundaries between orthodox and alternative medicine, on health and immigration in Mandate Palestine and Israel, and on public health in interwar Eastern Europe. His recent work examines the commercial determinants of health; in July 2026 he co-authored an analysis in The BMJ proposing a framework for artificial intelligence as a new commercial determinant of health.

He serves on the editorial boards of Frontiers in Public Health and Hektoen International: A Journal of Medical Humanities.

== Awards and honors ==
- Fulbright Visiting Professor, Columbia University Mailman School of Public Health (2005–2006)
- Honorary Member, Faculty of Public Health of the Royal College of Physicians, United Kingdom (2017)
- ASPHER Research Excellence Award (2022), presented at the ASPHER Deans' and Directors' Retreat in Sofia
- Fellow, The Hastings Center (2025)
- ASPHER Outstanding Project Award, for leading the Erasmus+ SEEEPHI project (July 2026)

== Selected publications ==
=== Edited volumes ===
- Austin Sarat, Nadav Davidovitch and Michal Alberstein (eds.), Trauma and Memory: Reading, Healing, and Making Law. Stanford: Stanford University Press, 2008. ISBN 9780804768122.
- Nadav Davidovitch, Michal Alberstein and Rakefet Zalashik (eds.), Collective Trauma in Israel: Historical, Social and Political Perspectives (in Hebrew). Ramat Gan: Bar-Ilan University Press, 2016.
- Hagai Boas, Yael Hashiloni-Dolev, Nadav Davidovitch, Dani Filc and Shai J. Lavi (eds.), Bioethics and Biopolitics in Israel: Socio-legal, Political and Empirical Analysis. Cambridge: Cambridge University Press, 2018.
- Guest-edited journal volumes: Health in Palestine 1850–2000 (Dynamis, 2005); Medical Borders (Science in Context, 2006); Scientific Medicine and the Politics of Public Health: Minorities in Interwar Eastern Europe (Science in Context, 2019).

=== Articles ===
- Dani Filc, Nadav Davidovich and Nora Gottlieb, "A Republican Egalitarian Approach to Bioethics", International Journal of Health Services 46(4), 2016, pp. 734–746. doi:10.1177/0020731415594601
- Eli Jaffe, Keren Dopelt, Nadav Davidovitch and Yuval Bitan, "Vaccination of the Elderly in Assisted Living by the Israeli Emergency Medical Services", American Journal of Public Health 111(7), 2021, pp. 1223–1226. doi:10.2105/AJPH.2021.306318
- Hagai Boas and Nadav Davidovitch, "Into the 'New Normal': The Ethical and Analytical Challenge Facing Public Health Post-COVID-19", International Journal of Environmental Research and Public Health 19(14), 2022, 8385. doi:10.3390/ijerph19148385
- Itai Bavli, Joel Lexchin, Nicholas King, Nadav Davidovitch et al., "Artificial intelligence as a new commercial determinant of health", BMJ 394, 2026, e100370. doi:10.1136/bmj-2026-100370
- Nadav Davidovitch and Joseph Brunch, "Israelis, Demand Palestinians Get Vaccinated, Too. Or the Pandemic Won't End", Haaretz, 2 March 2021 (op-ed).

== Personal life ==
Davidovitch is married to legal scholar Michal Alberstein, dean of the Faculty of Law at Bar-Ilan University, with whom he has co-edited two volumes on collective trauma; they have three children.
