= Matan Women's Institute for Torah Studies =

Midrasha

Coordinates: 1.7554°N 35.2087°E

The Matan Women's Institute for Torah Studies (Hebrew: מת״ן, an abbreviation of מכון תורני לנשים, Machon torani l’nashim) is an Israeli Midrasha dedicated to teaching the Talmud and other rabbinic literature to women.

The institute was established in 1988 by Malke Bina, who had studied at the Michlala Jerusalem College for Women and the Revel Graduate School of Yeshiva University. Its faculty includes Rachelle Sprecher Fraenkel and Avivah Gottlieb Zornberg.

Matan offers numerous classes, a year-long bet midrash program, as well as various certification programs. In 2012, Matan held a siyyum for fifteen women who had completed the Daf Yomi 7-year cycle of Talmud study, called by some the first of its kind.

== Notable faculty ==
- Malke Bina – Founder
- Rachelle Sprecher Fraenkel – Director of Matan's Hilkhata Institute (Advanced Halakha Program)
- Avivah Gottlieb Zornberg – Lecturer
- Yael Ziegler – Rosh Beit Midrash and Academic Director
