= Yael Bar-Zeev =

Israeli physician and epidemiologist

Yael Bar-Zeev (Hebrew: יעל בר-זאב) is an Israeli public health physician, behavioral scientist, epidemiologist, and a tobacco treatment specialist. She has been a faculty member at the Hebrew University-Hadassah Braun School of Public Health and Community Medicine since 2019. She is also the Chair of the Israel Medical Association for Smoking Cessation and Prevention.

Her thesis for her Doctorate of Philosophy in Behavioural Science at the University of Newcastle was entitled Improving health providers' management of smoking in Australian Indigenous pregnant women. She received her medical degree and MPH from Ben-Gurion University of the Negev.

== Publications ==
- Feasibility of Audio-Recording Consultations with Pregnant Australian Indigenous Women to Assess Use of Smoking Cessation Behaviour Change Techniques (Yael Bar-Zeev, Eliza Skelton, Michelle Bovill, Maree Gruppetta, Billie Bonevski, Gillian S. Gould, "Feasibility of Audio-Recording Consultations with Pregnant Australian Indigenous Women to Assess Use of Smoking Cessation Behaviour Change Techniques", Journal of Smoking Cessation, vol. 2021, Article ID 6668748, 7 pages, 2021. https://doi.org/10.1155/2021/6668748)
- The Indigenous Counselling and Nicotine (ICAN) QUIT in Pregnancy Pilot Study protocol: a feasibility step-wedge cluster randomised trial to improve health providers' management of smoking during pregnancy
