= Bonei Zion Prize =

- Official logo of the Bonei Zion Prize
- Awarded for: Achievements and contributions to Israeli society by Anglo immigrants
- Country: Israel
- Presented by: Nefesh B'Nefesh
- First award: 2013
- Website: www.boneizion.org.il

The Sylvan Adams Bonei Zion Prize (Hebrew: פרס בוני ציון; lit. "Builders of Zion Prize") is an annual award presented by the organization Nefesh B'Nefesh to recognize the achievements and contributions of Anglo immigrants to the State of Israel.

== Prize recipients ==
Year	Culture, Art & Sports	Young Leadership	Science & Medicine	Israel Advocacy	Business & Technology	Education	Community & Non-profit	Lifetime Achievement	Global Impact	Special Recognition
2026	Ami Baran	Barak Swarttz	Philip Klipstein	—	—	Chana Henkin	Naomi Stuchiner	Marta Weinstock-Rosin	Danielle Abraham	Ron Dermer
2024	—	—	Debra Gershov-West	Fleur Hassan-Nahoum	—	—	Phyllis Heimowitz	—	Eylon Levy	Natan Sharansky
2023	Peter Kurz	Emily Schrader	Carmi Z. Margolis	—	—	Sally Reidman	Shari Mendes	Yehezkel Caine	Danny Grossman	—
2022	Harry Ben Zion Brand	Asher Fredman	Arthur I. Eidelman	—	—	David Golinkin	Pamela and Aba Claman	Naomi Tsur	Morris Hartstein	—
2021	Josie Katz	Michal Berman	Jonathan Rieck	—	—	Daniel Chamovitz	David Marcu	Rabbi Daniel Tropper	Micha Odenheimer	—
2020	David Blatt	Zo Flamenbaum	Deborah Rund	—	—	Reuven Asch	Debbie Gross	Avraham Infeld	Dore Gold	—
2019	Danny Hakim	Miriam Ballin	Ora Paltiel	Michael Dickson	—	Beverly Gribetz	Leah Abramowitz	Harold Simon	—	—
2018	Linda Streit	Keren Hajioff	Marcia Javitt	Arsen Ostrovsky	—	Shlomo Riskin	Kalman Samuels	Morris Kahn	—	—
2017	Yoram Raanan	Scott Neiss, Capt. Libby Weisz	Ben Koren	Gerald Steinberg	—	Rabbi Haim Brovender	Beth Steinberg	Alice Shalvi, Eliezer Jaffe	—	—
2016	Estelle Friedman	Sahar Elbaz	Howard Cedar	—	Scott R. Tobin	Barbara Levin	Rachel Levmore	Moshe Arens	—	—
2015	Asher Weill	Asaf Stein	Charles Sprung	—	Jonathan Medved	Chana Reifman Zweiter	Seth Farber	Tal Brody	—	—
2014	Yaakov Kirschen	Lt. Nira Lee	Jeffrey Hausdorff	—	Yosef Abramowitz	Malke Bina	Joseph Gitler	Shimon Glick	—	—
