= Rachelle Fraenkel =

Israeli Torah educator and public figure

Rachelle Sprecher Fraenkel
- רחל שפרכר פרנקל
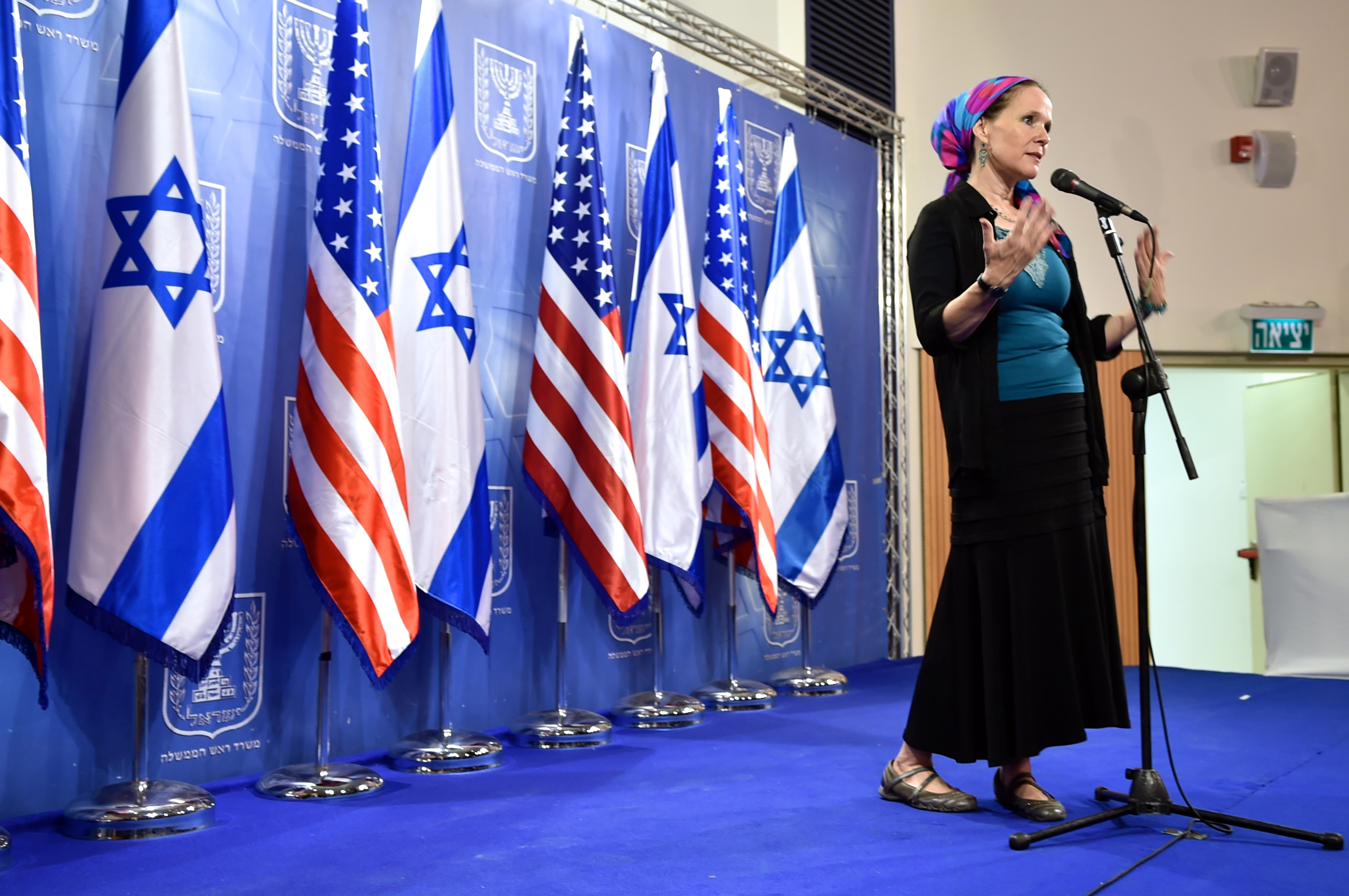
- Born: 1968 (age 57–58); Israel
- Education: Bar Ilan University; Lindenbaum; Matan Women's Institute for Torah Studies; Nishmat
- Occupations: Torah educator, Yoetzet Halacha
- Employers: Nishmat, The Jeanie Schottenstein Center for Advanced Torah Study for Women; Matan Women's Institute for Torah Studies
- Known for: Torah education, public speaking following the kidnapping and murder of her son Naftali Fraenkel

Rachelle Sprecher Fraenkel (Hebrew: רחל שפרכר פרנקל, romanized: Raḥel Shprecher Frahnkel; born 1968) is a Torah educator at Nishmat, The Jeanie Schottenstein Center for Advanced Torah Study for Women, and the director of Matan's Hilkhata Institute (Advanced Halakha Program) at Matan Women's Institute for Torah Studies. She became an international speaker after her son, Naftali Fraenkel, was kidnapped and murdered along with two other Israeli teens in 2014.

== Biography ==
Fraenkel lives in Nof Ayalon, Israel. She studied at Bar Ilan University, Lindenbaum, Matan, & Nishmat. She serves as a Yoetzet Halacha for families observing the rabbinic laws of niddah, and was in the first graduating class of Matan's Advanced Talmud Institute.

== Political activism ==
She was invited to speak at the United Nations Human Rights Council accompanied by the two other mothers: Bat Galim Shaer and Iris Yifrach. According to the New York Times, "She has become an international public figure, traveling to Geneva to speak to a United Nations committee, giving television interviews, meeting Israel's president and prime minister." She received press attention for her response to the hate crime that took place after the boys murder. At her son's funeral, Ha'aretz reported: "When Rachelle Fraenkel recited the Kaddish, the chief rabbi said 'Amen': The Mourner's Kaddish has never before been recited in public in Israel by an Orthodox woman of such stature and in front of cameras." (In Israel, it is not common for Orthodox woman to recite the mourner's Kaddish prayer.) The article said:

Rachelle Fraenkel became a public leader, a national heroine, and, just as important, a religious heroine as well, over the 18 days that her son and his friends were missing. Both men and women looked up to her because of her restraint, her faith, and the profound statements she made about the prayers being offered for the three boys' return. Her statement to the young children she met at the Western Wall that, "God is not our employee", revealed a new religious language.

In November 2014, she spoke at an alternative rally in Tel Aviv commemorating the assassination of Yitzhak Rabin.

On January 1, 2015, The Jerusalem Unity Prize was announced, in memory of the slain teenagers, with Fraenkel as one of the prize judges.

In 2019 Fraenkel was honored as one of the torchbearers in the national Israeli Independence Day ceremony.
