= Ora Paltiel =

Israeli epidemiologist

Ora Paltiel (Hebrew: אורה פלטיאל) is an epidemiologist and a professor in the Braun School of Public Health, where she was also director of the Master's in Public Health program from 2013 until 2016, and in the Department of Hematology. She has also served as Dean at the Braun School.

== Biography ==
Of Romanian and Ukrainian heritage, Paltiel was born in Canada and emigrated to Israel as a child. Both of her parents were seeking post-graduate degrees. Her family returned and settled in Ottawa before Paltiel went to Toronto for a bachelor's degree in anthropology. That is when she met her future husband, Mark Clarfield. The family moved to Israel in 1992.

Paltiel received her medical degree from the McGill University School of Medicine and a M.Sc.in Biostatistics and Epidemiology, also from McGill, in 1988. She trained in hematology, internal medicine and oncology.

== Research ==
Between 2010 and 2014, she studied 1631 Israelis and Palestinians in an effort to learn risk factors for Non-Hodgkin lymphoma (NHL). The study confirmed several risk factors including use of black hair dye, a first degree relative with blood cancer, and four to nine hours per week of sun exposure.

== Honors and awards ==
Paltiel received the Bonei Zion Prize in 2019 for Science and Medicine. At the time, she was director of the Center for Research in Clinical Epidemiology at the Hadassah Medical Center director of the Center for Research in Clinical Epidemiology at the Hadassah Medical Center.

== Selected publications ==
- Omri Besor, Ora Paltiel, Orly Manor, Milka Donchin, Orly Rauch, Vered Kaufman-Shriqui, Associations between density and quality of health promotion programmes and built environment features across Jerusalem, European Journal of Public Health, Volume 31, Issue 6, December 2021, Pages 1190–1196, https://doi.org/10.1093/eurpub/ckab132
- Human menopausal gonadotropin and the risk of epithelial ovarian cancer
