= Debbie Gross =

Israeli crisis center director

Debbie Gross (Hebrew: דבי גרוס) is the founder and director of the religious women crisis center Tahel. She founded the organization in 1993 to help women in a time of crisis and now it is a national center in Israel to help women and children dealing with trauma.

She is a psychologist and social worker by trade and a previous winner of a number of awards. These include the Jerusalem Mayor's Volunteer Award from Prime Minister Ehud Olmert in 2001, the Jerusalem Foundation Teddy Kollek Award for Community Leadership and Excellence in 2003, the Knesset award for “Women Who Are Changing The World” in 2016, and “The Award for Recognition for Fighting the Battle Against Violence Against Women” by the Minister of Social Equality of Israel in 2017.

In December 2017, Tahel announced a set of “Ten Guidelines” which are ethics guidelines for religious leaders to advocate for proper conduct with their congregants. The guidelines are interfaith and have been signed by religious leaders of many faiths.

In 2020, Debbie Gross received the Bonei Zion Prize in the field of Community & Non-profit.
