= Kidnapping and murder of Mohammed Abu Khdeir =

2014 murder of a 16-year-old Palestinian by Israeli settlers

- Location: Shuafat, East Jerusalem; Jerusalem Forest
- Date: 2 July 2014 approx. 4:00 a.m. (IDT, UTC+03:00)
- Attack type: Death by bludgeoning and burning
- Deaths: 1
- Perpetrators: 2 minors; Yosef Chaim Ben David
- No. of participants: 3
- Motive: Revenge for 2014 kidnapping and murder of Israeli teenagers
- Convictions: 2 life imprisonments; 21 years imprisonment

The kidnapping and murder of Mohammed Abu Khdeir occurred early on the morning of 2 July 2014. Khdeir, a 16-year-old Palestinian, was forced into a car by Israeli citizens on an occupied East Jerusalem street. His family immediately reported the fact to Israeli Police who located his charred body a few hours later at Givat Shaul in the Jerusalem Forest. Preliminary results from the autopsy suggested that he was beaten and burnt while still alive. The perpetrators subsequently claimed that the attack was a response to the abduction and murder of three Israeli teens on 12 June. The murders contributed to a breakout of hostilities in the 2014 Israel–Gaza conflict.

On Sunday, 6 July, police took into custody six Jewish suspects for interrogation. One confessed quickly, incriminating three others, some of them minors, and they were put on remand for 8 days. Within a day, three had confessed and reenacted the murder at the scene of the crime. Three other suspects were released as unconnected with the crime, though they heard about it from the alleged murderers.

Palestinian President Mahmoud Abbas blamed the murder on the Israeli government and demanded Israeli PM Benjamin Netanyahu condemn it "as we condemned the kidnapping of the three Israelis". The attack was widely condemned in Israel. Khdeir's family members have, however, blamed government incitement for the murder and rejected the PM's condolence message, as well as a visit by then President Shimon Peres. The day the suspects were arrested, the family of one of the Israeli victims, the Fraenkels, called the family of Abu Khdeir to condemn the murder and offer their condolences. The Fraenkels said they understand the magnitude of the loss and that they oppose any act of violence either by Jews or Arabs. The murder was condemned by the families of the three murdered Israeli teens, who sent Khdeir's family their condolences.

In the aftermath of Khdeir's murder, one of his cousins, Tariq Khdeir, a 15-year-old Palestinian-American boy, was beaten by Israeli police officers in an assault caught on camera. Another one of his cousins, a 19-year-old Mohammed Abu Khdeir, was detained by the Israeli police during a 28 July 2014 protest. Though he was an American citizen, Israel failed to notify US authorities of the arrest and the US has accused Israel of singling out Khdeir family members for arrest.

When Israel included Khdeir in its Victims of Acts of Terror Memorial at Mount Herzl, the family obtained its immediate removal. They had not been consulted, dismissed the inclusion as a bid to improve Israel's image, rebuffed the idea of him being memorialized among fallen Israeli soldiers who "killed his relatives in Gaza, Lebanon and the West Bank", stated the trial of the suspects was being dragged out, and complained that several months earlier, the Jerusalem council had forced them to remove his image from outside their home after it had hung there for four months, by threatening them with a per diem $500 fine, on the grounds it contravened a local Israeli law.

On 30 November 2015, the two minors involved were found guilty of Khdeirs' murder, and were respectively sentenced to life and 21 years imprisonment on 4 February. On 3 May 2016, Ben David was sentenced to life in prison and an additional 20 years.

== Background ==
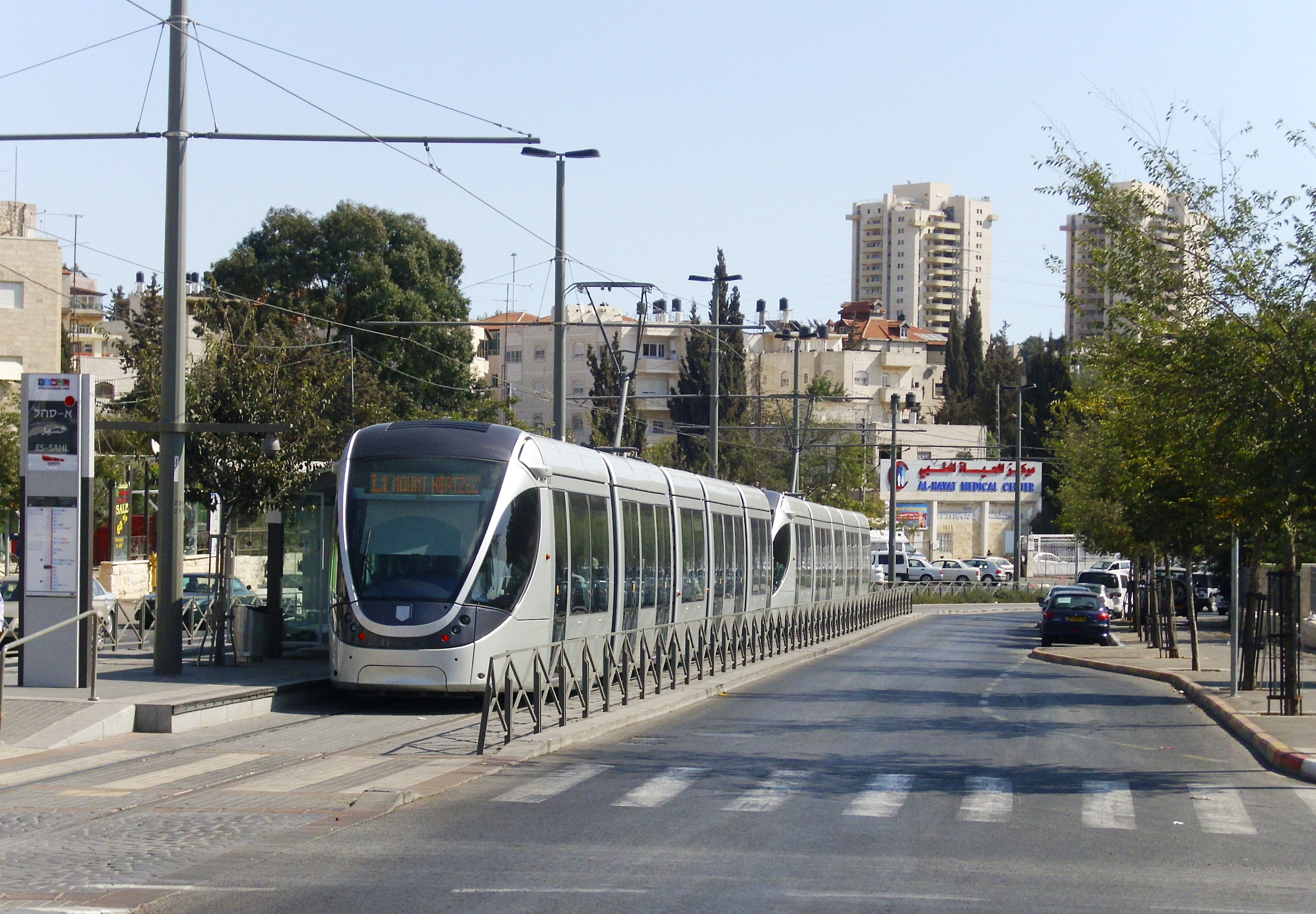
Main street in Shu'fat

The Shu'fat neighborhood, located in East Jerusalem, was home to Mohammed Abu Khdeir. The neighborhood is relatively well-off and calmer than some other areas and its residents do not often get into confrontations with the Israeli police. Muhammad Abu Khdeir was 16 years old. His father owned and ran an electric appliances store, and the boy was studying to become an electrician at the "Amal" vocational high school. The family are part of a large clan that is well known in Shu'afat. In his last days, he helped a family member decorate the main street in Shu'fat with lamps on the occasion of Ramadan.

On 9 June, the autopsy findings for the Beitunia killings were released confirming that the two Palestinian teenagers killed on 15 May 2014 in the incident were shot with live ammunition from the Israel Border Police.

On 12 June 2014, three Israeli teenagers, Eyal Yifrach, Gilad Shaar, and Naftali Frankel were hitchhiking home from school to a Jewish settlement in the West Bank and were kidnapped. They were killed almost immediately. In the interim, their fate became the focus of intense concern throughout Israeli society. They were buried late in the afternoon of 1 July. On the day of the funeral, Israeli premier Benjamin Netanyahu commented: "Hamas is responsible, and Hamas will pay. May the memory of the three boys be blessed."

In the evening the day of the funeral, hundreds of right-wing Israelis rampaged in Jerusalem yelling "Death to Arabs", and endeavoured to assault passers-by, who had to be extricated by police. The marches counted with the presence of prominent right-wing figures such as former MK Michael Ben-Ari, and Jewish Agency officials. MK Ayelet Shaked, posted on Facebook a quotation of journalist Ori Elitzur: "Behind every terrorist stand dozens of men and women, without whom he could not engage in terrorism. They are all enemy combatants, and their blood shall be on all their heads." Referring to "the enemy", Ben-Ari called on Israelis to "[m]ake Ramadan into a month of darkness for them!" The evening before the killing, a group of racist supporters of the Beitar football club, known as La Familia, held a violent demonstration, in which they chanted "death to Arabs" and harassed Palestinians nearby. A "rash of racist incitement on Israeli social media" broke out after the deaths were revealed. Rabbi Noam Perel, head of Bnei Akiva, the world's largest religious-Zionist youth organization, urged on his Facebook page that the IDF be transformed into an army of avengers, which "will not stop at 300 Philistine foreskins". He also wrote:

The travesty will be atoned for with the enemy's blood, not with our tears. A whole nation and thousands of years of history demands revenge. The government of Israel is convened for a meeting of vengeance that is not a mourning sitting.

On the same day, a Palestinian teenager was killed by Israeli forces in a Jenin refugee camp. The killing was widely celebrated by right-wing Israelis on social media as "revenge". A Facebook page "The People of Israel Demand Revenge" was set up by a 17-year-old, showing soldiers posing and touting their rifles, posting messages of "revenge". The page quickly gathered 35,000 "likes", but was taken down after the news of Khdeir's murder. One item submitted to the site had a photograph by two smiling Israeli girls with a sign saying, "Hating Arabs is not racism, it's values!" At the recommendation of Attorney General Yehuda Weinstein, the Israeli police launched a probe into call for incitement on social media. In addition, the IDF announced that soldiers posting messages or photos that pledged to avenge the teens' murder or used racist language will be severely punished.

On that Tuesday night, a Palestinian family registered a complaint with police concerning an attempt to kidnap their child, 10-year-old Moussa Zalum, on Shu'fat's main street. At the time, they reported, he was walking with his mother and brother when a car stopped and an attempt was made to try and pull him into the vehicle, grabbing him by the throat. The child managed to wriggle free, as the mother beat off the kidnapper and the car sped off. Early on Wednesday morning, 16-year-old Abu Khdeir was murdered. The mother later said two men were involved, and spoke Hebrew. The family alerted the police immediately, the mother said, and a patrol car passed and officers were given details and a description. In police accounts, the parents were to go to the police station and lay a formal complaint, something the family did not do, and therefore the police did not investigate. The police also alleged that the father told them the assailants were not Jewish, though the mother asserted the opposite in her own account. The police said that it was only after hearing of the Abu Khdeir kidnapping the following morning that police connected the two incidents.

== Disappearance and murder ==
On 2 July, the night of the abduction, witnesses say that around 3:45 am, while Abu Khdeir was waiting for friends near his home, he was taken and thrown into a car by two or three men.

As local youths of the mosque were leaving to get food for the predawn meal, two young men came up to Muhammad when he was very close to the mosque, spoke to him, and then pulled him into the vehicle. The mosque's Imam, a family relative called Mahmoud Abu Khdeir, described it as a grey Hyundai, driven by a third man. Cries for help were heard by people nearby, and according to Abu Khdeir's father, he yelled, "Dad, dad, save me." The father later showed images from local surveillance cameras, downloaded to his cellphone, of two men walking down the pavement where the kidnapping occurred. The vehicle then drove off quickly toward the French Hill Junction and from there to the Jerusalem Forest. Several bystanders saw the kidnapping, and chased the car before notifying Abu Khdeir's father. The family immediately notified the Israeli police, at 4:05 am, and the police, accused by the family of neglecting their complaints, tracked Abu Khdeir's cell phone, which was later retrieved from the home of one of the arrested suspects, and discovered his scorched body within an hour in the Jerusalem Forest. According to the Palestinian Attorney General, Dr. Muhammed Abed al-Ghani al-Aweiwi, an autopsy conducted at the Abu Kabir Forensic Institute in Tel Aviv revealed that the teen had soot in his lungs, indicating that he was alive and breathing when he was set alight. He had been forced to swallow petrol beforehand. The burns affected 90% of his body, and it appeared he had sustained head injuries from a beating and had been repeatedly hit in the head with a sharp object, which at the time was alleged to have been a tire iron, but is now alleged to have been a wrench (see #Investigation of the crime). The Israeli Police suspected that the same vehicle was used in both Abu Khdeir's and Zalum's cases.

According to the confession of the leading suspect, Yosef Haim Ben-David, 29, owner of an eyewear shop in Jerusalem, and resident of the settlement of Geva Binyamin, the original intention was to beat up an Arab or torch a shop. They switched into civilian clothes and removed their kippahs in order, as the leader confessed, not to shame God's name. They almost cancelled the project when, after stopping to dine, the Arab proprietor reminded them as they left not to forget their change. On sighting Mohammed Abu Khdeir, they asked for directions to Tel Aviv, and he either gave a rough indication, in poor Hebrew, or said he did not understand. As he began to dial his cellphone, perhaps suspicious, the minors clamped hands over his mouth and dragged him into the car where, after he yelled "Allahu Akhbar", he was choked, and the ringleader gave the instruction for him to be finished off. On arriving in the forest, he was beaten repeatedly with a crowbar, each blow accompanied by a recital of Jewish victims of terrorism: "This is for the Fogel family, and this is for Shalhevet Pass". They then poured gasoline over him, set him alight, and got rid of the evidence. The indictment against Ben-David and the two minors also included an attempt to kidnap the 7-year-old Beit Hanoun boy, Moussa Zaloum, whom they choked and whose mother they punched in the face, and the torching of an Arab store earlier in June in the Palestinian village of Hizma.

=== Follow-up incidents reported ===
On Thursday evening, Palestinians of Shu'fat told local media that four settlers from Pisgat Zeev had attempted to kidnap a 7-year-old local child, Muhammad Ali al-Kiswani, and had fled on being thwarted. On Friday Palestinians of Osarin near Nablus in the West Bank complained that one of them, 22-year-old Tariq Ziad Zuhdi Adeli, had been sprayed with a gas by settlers, abducted in a car and then, taken outside the village, sustained injuries from a hatchet attack to his legs.

A 13-year-old Palestinian boy went missing in Wadi al-Joz, East Jerusalem on 4 July. A settler car had been seen in the area at the time.

Three days later, a video was aired showing Israeli undercover agents beating up Abu Khdeir's cousin, 15-year-old American citizen Tariq Khdeir, in a secluded area after the boy had been handcuffed and pinned to the ground. Tariq is a student at Universal Academy of Florida high school in Tampa. Israeli spokesmen said he resisted arrest and had a slingshot in his possession. His father, who was present, said his son was not involved in the protests. At a hearing before Congressional staffers on his return, Tariq stated that he was watching the demonstration from an alley, among a crowd, when Israeli police charged them, and, on noting the use of rubber bullets, he leapt over a fence to escape, but was caught by officers, handcuffed and then beaten unconscious.

Sunjeev Bery, an advocacy director for Amnesty International later stated, in reference to the incident, that

non-violent protest in Palestine is, in fact, illegal under military law 101. The law, in effect since 1967, states that gatherings of 10 or more people are forbidden unless expressly permitted by the IDF

The U.S. State Department stated that it was "profoundly troubled by reports that he was severely beaten while in police custody and strongly condemn any excessive use of force", and called for "a speedy, transparent and credible investigation and full accountability for any excessive use of force". Israeli Border Police started an official investigation on 5 July. Activists drew attention to the video and detention using the Twitter hashtag #FreeTarek. He was released Sunday morning on bail, kept under house arrest for 10 days, and forbidden residence in Shu'fat. He returned to Florida at the end of the 10-day period. Hours after he left, Israeli police ransacked his East Jerusalem home, destroyed furniture and emptied cabinets. In January 2015, Tariq was cleared of any wrongdoing that led to the attack.

In November 2015, one of three policemen involved in the incident, the officer who actually assaulted Tariq Khdeir while he was pinned down, and whose name remains under a gag order, was charged and convicted of assaulting him, and sentenced to 45 days' community service and a suspended prison sentence of four months. The judge cited "mitigating circumstances such as the policeman's lack of a criminal record, positive character references, and the fact that the policeman lost his job after the incident". The teen's family described the sentence as "a shameful slap on the wrist" which "sends the wrong message that Israel tolerates the violent, extrajudicial beating of children". US State Department spokesperson John Kirby said the US government was "disappointed" that the officer "was spared prison time by an Israeli court", adding that, "Given the clear evidence captured on videotape of the excessive use of force, it is difficult to see how this sentence would promote full accountability for the actions of the police officer in this case". Brad Parker, an attorney for Defense for Children International-Palestine, estimated that Tariq "possibly spent more time in detention than the unnamed officer convicted of brutally assaulting him". The indictment stated that the other officers "did not attack the boy, nor could [they] have prevented it, and therefore were excluded from the suit".

As of 3 August 2014, three of his cousins arrested with him are still in detention. As of 22 August, this includes a 19-year-old also called Mohammed Abu Khdeir, a US citizen, whose arrest, about which US authorities were not notified, has led the US to suspect that Israel is targeting the Khdeir family.

== Investigation of the crime ==
According to the preliminary indictments released for publication in mid-July, two of the suspects decided to kill a Palestinian in revenge for the killing of the three Israeli teenagers. Cruising around the neighbourhood they attacked a 9-year-old boy and then fled. On the evening before the kidnapping, joined by a third person, they arrived at Shuafat via the Damascus Gate neighborhood, and the thirty-year-old suspect drove round the area while they argued whether to kidnap a man, a woman or a male teenager. Eventually they seized Abu Khdeir, beat and stunned him, and took him to the Jerusalem Forest, where they spilled flammable material over him, set him on fire, and fled to Tel Aviv to create an alibi. Israeli officials initially said that the police believed Khdeir had been probably killed in revenge for the killing of three Israeli teens, but that they were also looking into possibility that Khdeir's death might have been an honour killing, or other criminal act, though it was noted that the Khdeir family had no criminal history. The Israeli police at the time justified their decision not to discard the hypothesis of an internal feud or dispute within the clan as the cause for the murder, saying that they knew of earlier attempts to kidnap Abu Khdeir family members, including his younger sister. Two different squads were formed to follow up investigations into both hypotheses, of a 'nationalist' or 'criminal' (Arab) crime. "Israeli military and police sources informed the media as early as 2 July 2014 that the murder was most likely a nationalistically-motivated revenge killing."

From the outset, rumours abounded, with Israelis and pro-Israelis on social network media suggesting the boy had been killed by Palestinian criminals, or by his relatives in an honour killing, with insinuations that he was gay. There were suspicions that, in order to discredit the Khdeir family, the Israeli police planted rumors in the Israeli media about an honor killing provoked by the teen's supposed sexual orientation. Lara Friedman, from the left-wing Israeli group Peace Now, said that this hypothesis was highly unlikely as homophobic honor killings have never been recorded in Palestine, and she asserted that the scenario was raised by the Israelis in a show of pinkwashing that constituted a blood libel against the Palestinian nation. Other commentators also made reference to the concept of pinkwashing, accusing Israelis of being overly willing to take up the honor killing narrative, and too confident of its veracity, so as to remove from any Israeli Jews the blame for Khdeir's murder and portray Palestinians as barbarians. Khdeir's parents, who went through long hours interrogation by the Israeli police, also accused it of trying to force the honor killing narrative and attempting a cover up "to protect the settlers". Khdeir's father complained that in the lengthy police interrogation the police asked many questions about the family's personal life, how much pocket money the boy had, and if he had any enemies, but challenged him when the issue of a settler kidnapping was raised.

In pre-dawn raids on Sunday 6 July, Shin Bet and police rounded up six suspects, and placed a gag order on the press, which was partially lifted around 5:00 pm. The breakthrough was firstly leaked by anonymous Israeli sources and soon after the police confirmed the arrests, after the gag order was lifted. It emerged that the six suspects, some minors, hailed from Beit Shemesh, Jerusalem and the West Bank settlement of Adam, otherwise known as Geva Binyamin and had been arrested by tracking the car's vehicle registration plate, which they had obtained from security video in the area. It was also reported that the six are also suspected of having attempted to kidnap Moussa Zalum two days earlier.

Later that evening, one suspect confessed and incriminated the other five. Five were remanded for 8 days, and one for a further 5 days, by the Petah Tikva Magistrates Court, which turned down a request they be held for 15 days. Early reports had associated the suspects with the extreme right wing, and sources then revealed that at least some of the suspects had taken part in the Beitar demonstration held the evening before the kidnapping. In addition, one was identified as having an ultra-Orthodox background, another as hailing from an ultra-Orthodox Sephardic family identifying with the Shas worldview. In the only official statement about the arrests, police spokesman Micky Rosenfeld said that "a number of suspects were arrested for the killing", and "there are strong indications that the background was nationalistic". By Monday, three had confessed to participating in the murder, and in the presence of police, re-enacted the deed at the scene of the crime in the Jerusalem Forest.

The suspects were initially denied access to counsel because, according to Justice Minister Tzipi Livni, "that's what the law allows regarding terrorists". On 9 July, the Magistrate Court in Petah Tikva ordered the release on 10 July of three of the suspects thought to be part of the murder group, but who were not part of the murder itself, though suspected of knowing about it. The three main suspects confessed to the murder of Abu Khdeir, and remain in custody. They are a 30-year-old man from a community near Jerusalem and two minors from Jerusalem. Of three killers, two have a history of mental illness; both are on medication.

On 14 July, it was reported the three remaining suspects confessed to the kidnapping and murder, as well as the kidnapping attempt of the other Palestinian boy the previous day. They were said to be preparing to enter an insanity plea. Abu Khdeir's father said on the subject, "From the very first day of the investigation, I said that they will either say that the killers are crazy, or they will set them free." He also stated, "Justice is when they destroy their houses [of his sons murderers], just like they destroyed the houses of the suspects in Hebron", referring to the demolishing of the homes of the two main suspects of the murder of Israeli teenagers, Marwan Qawasmeh and Amer Abu Aisha, in Hebron. The Israeli Supreme Court, however, has rejected the argument that Khdeir's murder should be treated equally to that of the slain settlers.

On 20 July, the main suspect in the murder Muhammad Abu Khdeir, Yosef Haim Ben David, was cleared for publication. The resident of Geva Binyamin, a settlement also known as "Adam", is accused of hitting the boy with a wrench, pouring gasoline on him and lighting him on fire. His defense counsel argued that advertising may endanger his family. The name of the other two main suspects will not be published since they are both minors.

=== Trial and sentencing ===
On 27 July 2014, the three main suspects were arraigned. The main suspect, Yosef Ben-David, said in the entrance hall, "I am the messiah". At his second pre-trial appearance on 18 November 2014, Ben-David declined to cooperate with the Jerusalem District Court, and refused to speak. Earlier in November Israeli health officials deemed him to be of sound mind. The two minors pleaded guilty to abduction, but asserted their innocence of the charge of murder. Settlers reportedly spat on the Khdeir family outside the court. The Khdeir family is calling on the Israeli government to demolish the alleged murderers' homes just as those of Palestinian terrorists' homes are demolished.

In June 2015, one of the teenagers involved testified he believed the plan was to kidnap an Arab and beat him. Upon arriving at the Jerusalem forest, Ben-David struck Abu Khdeir's head twice with a crowbar. The teenager did not see Ben-David set Abu Khdeir on fire but understood it from his words.

On 30 November 2015, the two minors involved were found guilty of murder. Yosef Ben-David, the third defendant, was also found to have committed the crime, but had another hearing scheduled for 20 December after his mental state was questioned in a report his lawyers submitted. Khdeirs' father denounced the "trick" in only submitting the psychiatric report in the last moment before sentences were announced, voicing his fear that the Israeli court would set all the accused murderers free.

On 4 February, the two minors were sentenced. One was given life imprisonment, the other was sentenced to serve 21 years. According to one observer, both are likely to spend less than 20 years in prison, due to parole and possible sentence reductions. Hussein Abu Khdeir, the father of the victim, expressed disappointment that one of the minors escaped a life sentence, and renewed his demand that both have their homes demolished and Israeli citizenship revoked. He has pleaded to take action against Israeli authorities for the "lenient" punishment of the two convicted murderers, even though he says he has no faith in the Israeli justice system. The court ruled that their leader, Yosef Haim Ben-David, committed the crime. However, the conclusion of his case was still pending on the outcome of a psychiatric evaluation. On 22 February 2016, a psychiatric evaluation determined that Ben-David was fit to stand trial and was responsible for his actions On 19 April he was found guilty of murder and sentencing was scheduled for 3 May. In late April it was reported that Ben-David tried to commit suicide in his cell, and that he was slightly injured. On 3 May 2016, Ben David was sentenced to life in prison and an additional 20 years. On 8 February 2018, the Israeli Supreme Court rejected an appeal from Ben-David and the minors convicted in the crime.

On 24 September 2026, Ben-David died while serving his life sentence at age 42. He became ill in prison and was evacuated to a hospital, where he was pronounced dead. His medical condition was not disclosed due to privacy laws.

== Family reactions, riots and funeral ==
Abu Khdeir was given a martyr's funeral in Jerusalem. His family requested that only Palestinian flags be waved near his coffin, though some flew the banner of the Palestinian Islamic Jihad. The boy's father blamed "fascist murderers", and called on the Israel Prime Minister Benjamin Netanyahu to deal with the culprits in the same way as he is handling the murderers of Jewish teenagers, by destroying their homes, as had been done in the previous case with the Palestinian suspects. He later reiterated his call to demolish the homes of the three suspects, and added they should be burned to death. He noticed Israel's double standards regarding treatment of Jewish terrorists by remarking, "A month has passed since the murder, and the murderers' homes have still not been destroyed". Abu Khdeir's uncle blamed the crime on "[e]veryone in the government... from [Prime Minister Benjamin] Netanyahu down" for fanning racial hostility against Palestinians. The teen's father compared the burning to death of his son to what Jews suffered at German hands in the Holocaust, and attributed the incident to the anti-Arab atmosphere in Israel after three Israeli youths had been murdered, which in his view functioned like a 'green light' for assaulting Arabs.

After the arrest of the six suspects, Abu Khdeir's mother, Suha, manifested pessimism that they would be duly punished, saying, "I don't have any peace in my heart, even if they captured who they say killed my son. They're only going to ask them questions and then release them. What's the point?"

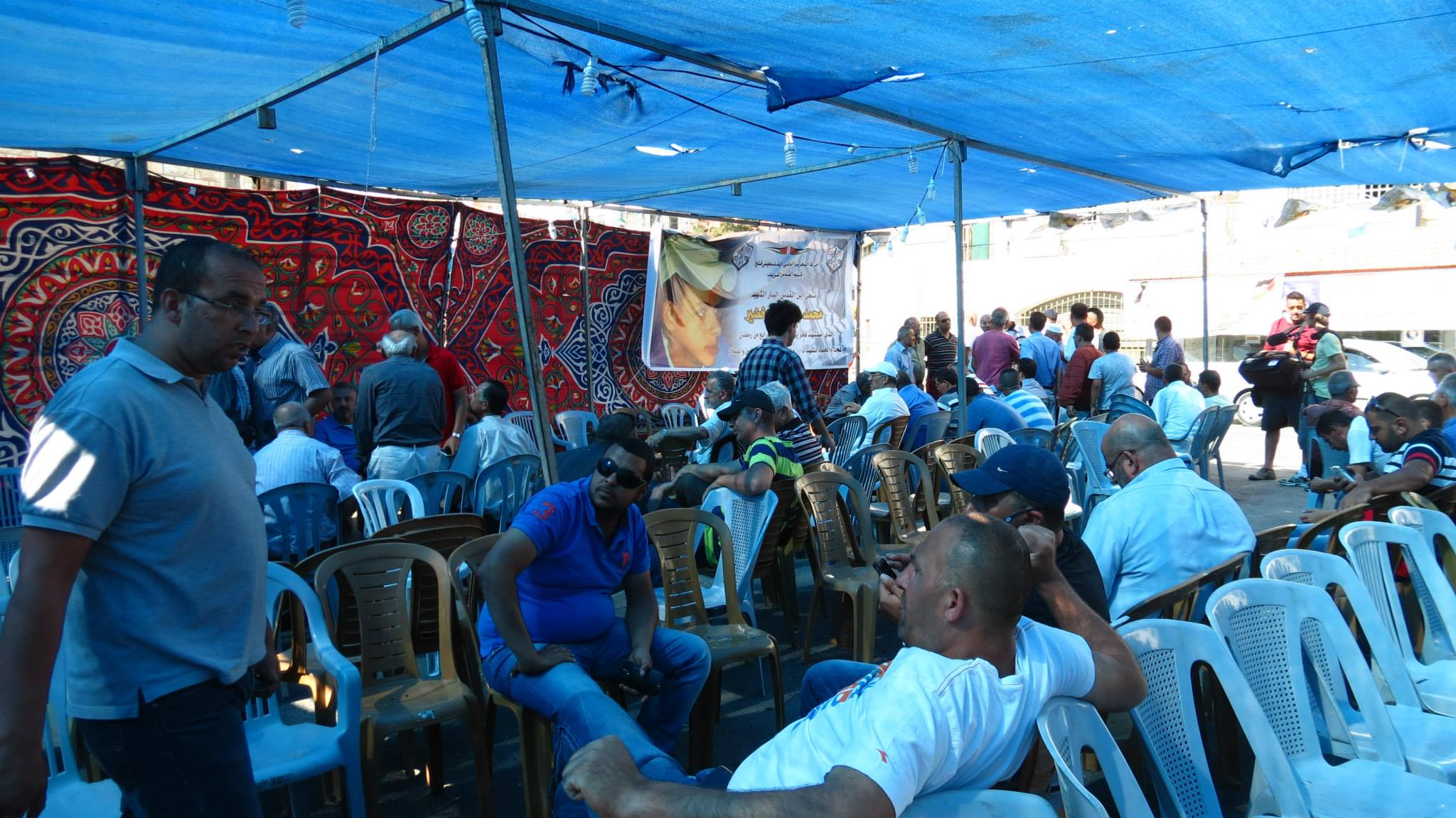
Mourning tent of Muhamed Abu Khdeir

Prime Minister Netanyahu sent his condolences to the victim's family, saying: "There is no place for such murders in our society." The condolences were rejected by the family, who said, "[W]e refuse to accept the condolences of someone who agrees on the murder of our people in Jerusalem, the West Bank, and Gaza". Despite concern from family members that visits from Israeli Jews could serve as a public relations stunt for Israel, the family agreed to receive visits from them at its mourning tent, largely to conform to hospitality diktats in Arab culture. Abu Khdeir warned, however, that the family would not allow right-wing Israelis in.

The family turned away a visit by then Israeli President Shimon Peres. Public Security Minister Yitzhak Aharonovitch announced he was going to pay a visit at the Abu Khdeir family home, but the visit was reportedly canceled due to scheduling constraints. Israel's Ashkenazi Chief Rabbi, David Lau, also had a planned visit canceled, whether on security grounds or because the family refused to see him is unclear. Among the Israeli officials who did visit the mourning tent, are MK Shelly Yachimovich (Labor), MK Michal Rozin, and Environmental Protection Minister Amir Peretz. Peretz became the target of abuse on his Facebook page from right-wing Israelis opposed to the visit; they made death threats against him and his family, and expressed support for Khdeir's murderers. The Abu Khdeir family also spoke with Justice Minister Tzipi Livni. As part of an initiative led by an Israeli NGO combating hate crime, the Tag Meir organization organized for chartered buses from Tel Aviv and Jerusalem for a large Israeli contingent wishing to pay respects to the Abu Khdeir family, which welcomed them in the mourners' tent. Anti-racist Israeli activists from Jerusalem also came to express their condolences.

Abu Khdeir's murder sparked off fierce riots for several days, threatening to spilling over to broader unrest. In the Shu'fat area and East Jerusalem, a half-mile section of a major thoroughfare and the Jerusalem Light Rail passing through it were severely damaged. A significant faction in the wave of riots was the suspicion that Israeli extremists were behind a revenge killing of Abu-Khdeir. In a different area, near the West Bank Israeli settlement of Ma'ale Adumim stones and Molotov cocktails were thrown and rolled burning tires at security forces, according to Israeli police. A small riot also took place in the Israeli-Arab town of Tayibe where locals burned tires at the town entrance. Police arrested three locals for allegedly throwing stones at a passing vehicle on Highway 444. In the aftermath of Khdeir's murder, Israel arrested 760 Palestinian citizens of Jerusalem, 260 of them children.

Khdeir's funeral coincided with the onset of the first Friday prayers of the Muslim holy month of Ramadan. Israeli police blocked all the roads leading from East Jerusalem's Palestinian neighborhood westwards, and placed limits on Muslim worshippers at Al-Aqsa, where the year before, on the occasion of Ramadan, some 80,000 had worshipped. Just 8,000 Palestinians managed to attend the mosque that day and numerous riots broke out, with East Jerusalem youths throwing stones and makeshift Molotov cocktails at Israeli police. 100 Arab Israelis mounted a protest at Nazareth and two were arrested by police on Sunday, and a further 15 arrested were made in Tamra during clashes with police. Palestinian flags that had been raised in the Palestinian neighborhoods where rioting occurred were removed by teams from the Jerusalem municipal council sent to clean up the areas.

In the wake of the 2014 Jerusalem synagogue massacre in mid-November 2014 speculation circulated in the Israeli media that the attack might have been motivated by a desire to avenge the murder of Abu Khdeir. Shin Bet chief Yoram Cohen gave support to this view, saying that, along with the disputed status of Al-Aqsa, the murder of Abu Khdeir is the main factor feeding the ongoing unrest in Jerusalem. Shortly after the murder, a number of media divulged the fact that Ben-David's father is a rabbi who heads a Kollel in Har Nof.

In July 2016, the Abu Khdeir family petitioned the Israeli High Court of Justice that the homes of the murderers be demolished, as is done to Palestinians accused of terrorism. In July 2017 the Israeli High Court declined their petition on the basis that they believed house demolitions would be ineffective due to the time elapsed since the murder while also stating that unlike the government's position, the home demolition policy was valid for both Jewish and Palestinian attackers. The Abu Khdeir family responded saying that, "We never had high hopes for Israel's legal system". A lawyer for the family said the petition effort was intended to expose the Israeli government's racism against Palestinians.

=== Civil lawsuit ===
In April 2018, the Khdeir family announced that it is filing a civil lawsuit against the perpetrators of the attack in order to "add to their punishment". The family is demanding that they pay 5.6 million Israeli shekel ($1.6 million) in damages. Abu Khdeir, the family father, said his family took that decision out of fear that the perpetrators will benefit from a sentence reduction from the Israeli government on a "racist basis". The family, however, expects Israeli authorities to reject the lawsuit.

== Reactions ==
=== Palestine ===
- President Mahmoud Abbas accused Israeli settlers of carrying out the attack and called for the "strongest punishment against the murderers if Israel truly wants peace".
- Hamas released a statement saying that, "Our people will not let this crime pass... You will pay the price for these crimes."

=== Israel ===
- Prime Minister Benjamin Netanyahu condemned the murder, said "I do not distinguish between terrorism and terrorism" and urged a swift inquiry into the "reprehensible murder" and called on people to respect the rule of law. Nir Barkat, Mayor of Jerusalem, said the killing was "a horrible and barbaric act which I strongly condemn. This is not our way, and I am fully confident that our security forces will bring the perpetrators to justice. I call on everyone to exercise restraint."
- Members of the anti-Zionist Jewish religious group Neturei Karta expressed their condolences at the mourning tent to Abu-Khdairs family. A letter of condolence by Rabbi Meir Hirsh addressed to the family was given. It expressed their understanding and solidarity in grief pain and sorrow.
- Knesset parliamentarian, Ahmad Tibi (United Arab List), speaking at the boy's funeral, said, "We don't demand revenge – we demand freedom."

=== International ===
- The Government of Colombia, through a released statement, condemned the murder of Muhammad Abu Khdeir that took place in the city of Jerusalem and made a call to hold those responsible against the law in the shortest time possible. Colombia also urged the involved parties to "avoid acts of violence and restore understatement".
- Secretary of State John Kerry issued a statement condemning the murder and calling Israel and the Palestinian Authority "to take all necessary steps to prevent acts of violence and bring their perpetrators to justice". Later, on 20 August, the United States expressed concern, through Deputy Spokeswoman Marie Harf, that Israel was targeting the family. Another cousin, also an American citizen, of the Khdeir family had been arrested on 28 July and held in detention without Israel notifying the US consulate. Concern was also expressed over "the fact that members of the Khdeir family appeared to be singled out for arrest by the Israeli authorities".
- (European Union) EU Foreign Affairs chief Catherine Ashton issued a statement condemning the murder and expressing concern over the potential for more violence. Ashton urged Israelis and Palestinians to exercise "maximum restraint" in the wake of the deaths.
- (United Nations) Secretary-General Ban Ki-moon, said the attack was a "despicable act" and demanded the perpetrators be brought to justice.

=== Other reactions ===
==== Mother of one murdered Israeli teen ====
Rachel Fraenkel, mother of 16-year-old Naftali, when she heard that a Palestinian teenager had been murdered in apparent revenge for her son, condemned it immediately. She broke into her own period of mourning to issue a statement: "There is no difference between blood and blood. Murder is murder. There is no justification and no atonement for murder."

In another occasion, Ms. Fraenkel stated: "Even in the abyss of mourning for Gil-Ad, Eyal and Naftali, it is difficult for me to describe how distressed we are by the outrage committed in Jerusalem – the shedding of innocent blood in defiance of all morality, of the Torah, of the foundation of the lives of our boys and of all of us in this country. Only the murderers of our sons, along with those who sent them and those who helped them and incited them to murder – and not innocent people – will be brought to justice: by the army, the police, and the judiciary, not by vigilantes. No mother or father should ever have to go through what we are going through, and we share the pain of Mohammed's parents."

==== La Familia ====
Members of La Familia said "[w]e hope this is the first of many. These [suspects] represent us and what we think. We're quite proud of their actions. Arabs have killed us for long enough."

== Commemoration ==
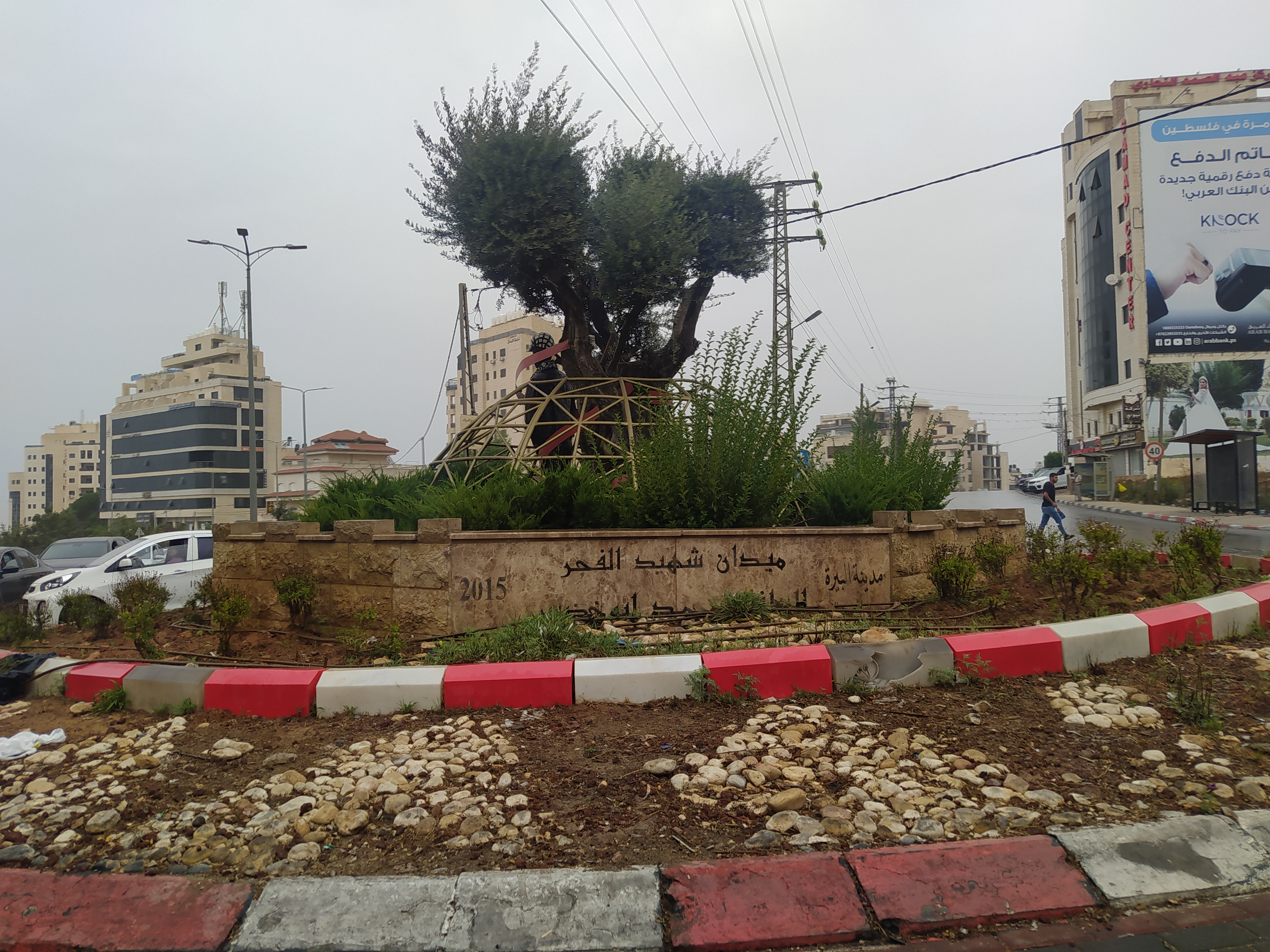
Mohammad Abu Khadir Square in Al-Bireh.

Shortly after Abu Khdeir's murder, a rock monument was constructed by several dozen residents of Beit Zayit and Jerusalem at the site where his charred body was found and a memorial was conducted. It was vandalized twice within a week, but Israelis from the HaNoar HaOved VeHaLomed and Dror-Israel youth movements rebuilt it.

Soon after the murder, the family raised a small monument on their fence, together with a large sign with a picture of their son outside their home. Two months later, Jerusalem municipal officials asked them to dismantle the monument, which they refused to do. On 24 October, four months after his death, the police head of the Neve Shalom station informed the local mukhtar, the family lawyer, and the boy's father, Housain Abu Khdeir, and told him to take the picture down immediately or to pay a fine of 3,000 NIS (~$600) for every day it remained in place. Jerusalem municipality officials stated they had delayed the notification, despite the fact that the sign violated a local law, because of the sensitivities of the case. Said Abu Khdeir, a relative, criticized the demand for being forthcoming while the suspected murderers still remained unpunished: it would not calm matters, he added, but only increase hostilities between Jews and Arabs. The family complied to avoid paying the fine.

In 2015, a square commomerating Mohammad abu Khdair was opened in Al-Bireh, West Bank.

Over the objections of the Almagor Terror Victims Association, which stated the killing was a criminal act that did not "belong to the national narrative or ethos", Khdeir was recognized by Israel as a victim of terrorism, a move which entitled the family to compensation, and his name was included in the Victims of Acts of Terror Memorial at Mount Herzl. This was done without consulting the family, which learned of the recognition from media outlets, and they immediately requested it be removed. Abu Khdeir's father stated to Yedioth Ahronoth that, while the initiative was meant to honour his son, he would rather be given permission to keep a large portrait of his boy hanging outside their home in Shuafat, an area Palestinian claim as part of their future state. The family gave a number of reasons for objecting to the use of their son's name: adding their son, a Palestinian, to a list of Jewish soldiers fallen since the creation of the state, struck them as a move to improve Israel's image. They also expressed exasperation at the slowness of court proceedings in the trial of those suspected of the murder of their son, 12 hearings had gone by to date, whereas in the family's view, the evidence was overwhelming and Palestinians accused of terror acts are, they claimed, subject to rapid trials.

== Media bias allegations ==
Pro-Palestinian voices and media watchdogs alleged that there are differences in the way the Western media responded to Abu Khdeir's case and the one that immediately preceded it, that of the slain Israeli teens. More specifically, whereas the latter case was shown from the perspective of the shocked Israeli nation, of the aggrieved family and friends of the teens, the media take on Abu Khdeir's murder focused on the potential for further revenge attacks and the Israeli Jewish fear of instability after chaotic protests took place in Israeli Arab towns over Khdeir's murder.

The NYT's Jerusalem correspondent, Jodi Rudoren, was criticized by, among others, Yousef Munayyer as being a 'stenographer' for Israeli police, after she cited Micky Rosenfeld's version about Tareq Khdeir's brutal beating without noting what Rosenfeld's remarks ignored, that the beating took place after the boy had been subdued.

== In culture ==
In July 2019, the American television network HBO announced the launch of the series Our Boys based on the events of the summer of 2014 of the murder of Mohammed Abu Khdeir. The 10-episode series is a co-production with an Israeli Keshet channel and the first in HBO to be broadcast all in Arabic and Hebrew.

== See also ==
- Silent Intifada
- Israeli settler violence
