= Jerusalem Prize =

Israeli literary award

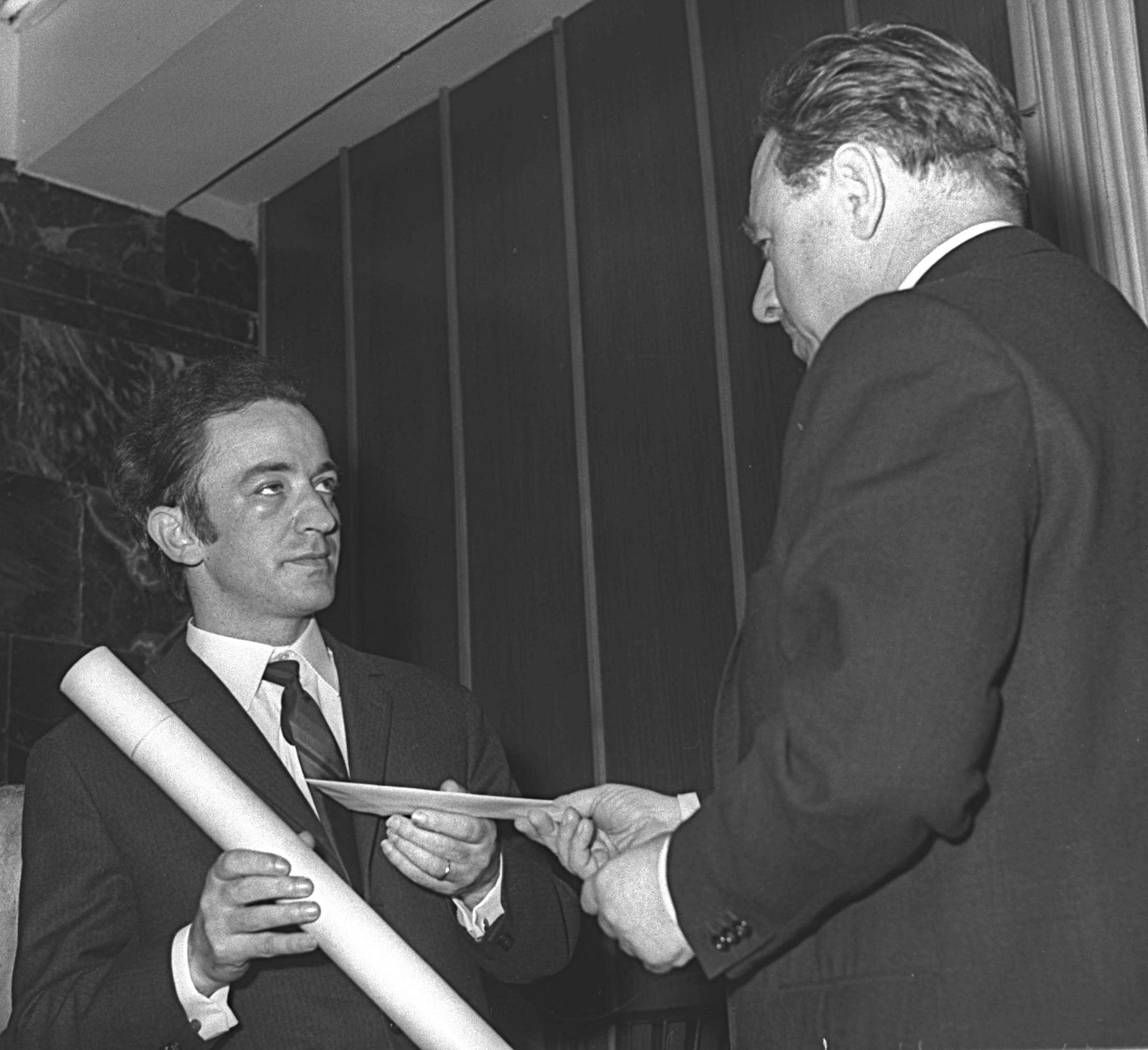
- Jerusalem Mayor Teddy Kollek (r) handing French author André Schwarz-Bart the 1967 Jerusalem Prize for Literature
- Awarded for: writers whose works have dealt with themes of human freedom in society
- Location: Jerusalem
- Country: Israel
- Presented by: Jerusalem International Book Forum
- Established: 1963
- Website: https://www.jbookforum.com./jerusalem-prize-winner

The Jerusalem Prize for the Freedom of the Individual in Society is a biennial literary award given to writers whose works have dealt with themes of human freedom in society.

It is awarded at the Jerusalem International Book Forum (previously known as the Jerusalem International Book Fair), and the recipient usually delivers an address when accepting the award. The award is valued at $10,000.

The prize's inaugural year was 1963, awarded to Bertrand Russell who had won the Nobel Prize in 1950. Octavio Paz, V. S. Naipaul, J. M. Coetzee, and Mario Vargas Llosa all won the Jerusalem Prize prior to winning the Nobel Prize in Literature.

No prize was awarded in 2023, the first such occasion in the award's history.

== List of laureates ==
| Year | Picture | Name | Nationality | Languages | Genres |
|---|---|---|---|---|---|
| 1963 | | Bertrand Russell | United Kingdom | English | Philosophy, essay |
| 1965 | | Max Frisch | Switzerland | German | Drama, novel, philosophy |
| 1967 | | André Schwarz-Bart | France | French | Novel |
| 1969 | | Ignazio Silone | Italy | Italian | Novel, short story, essay |
| 1971 | | Jorge Luis Borges | Argentina | Spanish | Short story, poetry, essay, philosophy, literary criticism, translation |
| 1973 | | Eugène Ionesco | Romania / France | French | Drama, novel |
| 1975 | | Simone de Beauvoir | France | French | Philosophy, novel, drama |
| 1977 | | Octavio Paz | Mexico | Spanish | Poetry, essay |
| 1979 | | Isaiah Berlin | Russia / United Kingdom | English | Philosophy, essay |
| 1981 | | Graham Greene | United Kingdom | English | Novel, short story, autobiography, drama, essay, screenplay |
| 1983 | | Vidiadhar Surajprasad Naipaul | Trinidad and Tobago / United Kingdom | English | Novel, short story, essay |
| 1985 | | Milan Kundera | Czechoslovakia / France | Czech / French | Novel, short story, poetry, essay, drama |
| 1987 | | John Maxwell Coetzee | South Africa / Australia | English | Novel, essay, translation |
| 1989 | | Ernesto Sabato | Argentina | Spanish | Novel, essay |
| 1991 | | Zbigniew Herbert | Poland | Polish | Poetry, essay, drama |
| 1993 | | Stefan Heym | Germany | German / English | Novel, short story, autobiography, essay |
| 1995 | | Mario Vargas Llosa | Peru / Spain | Spanish | Novel, short story, essay, drama, memoirs |
| 1997 | | Jorge Semprún | Spain | French / Spanish | Novel, essay |
| 1999 | | Don DeLillo | United States | English | Novel, short story, drama, screenplay, essay |
| 2001 | | Susan Sontag | United States | English | Short story, novel, drama, essay |
| 2003 | | Arthur Miller | United States | English | Drama, screenplay, essay |
| 2005 | | António Lobo Antunes | Portugal | Portuguese | Novel |
| 2007 | | Leszek Kołakowski | Poland | Polish | Philosophy, history |
| 2009 | | Haruki Murakami | Japan | Japanese | Novel, short story |
| 2011 | | Ian McEwan | United Kingdom | English | Novel, short story, drama, screenplay |
| 2013 | | Antonio Muñoz Molina | Spain | Spanish | Novel |
| 2015 | | Ismail Kadare | Albania | Albanian | Novel, short story, poetry, essay, drama, screenplay |
| 2017 | | Karl Ove Knausgaard | Norway | Norwegian | Novel, autobiography |
| 2019 | | Joyce Carol Oates | United States | English | Novel, short story, drama, essay, memoirs, poetry |
| 2021 | | Julian Barnes | United Kingdom | English | Novel, essay, memoirs, short story |
| 2025 | | Michel Houellebecq | France | French | Novel, poetry, essay |
