= Marta Weinstock-Rosin =

Israeli neuropharmacologist

- מרתה וינשטוק-רוזין
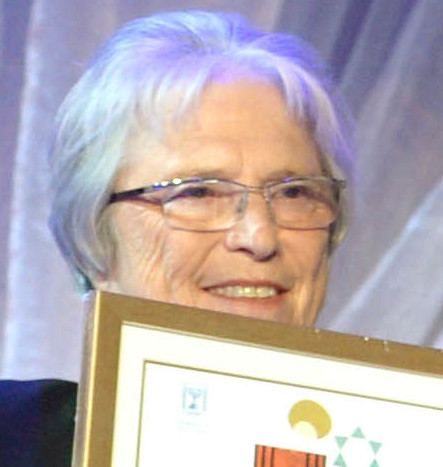
- Marta Weinstock-Rosin in 2014
- Born: 1935 (age 90–91); Vienna, Austria
- Occupations: Neuropharmacologist; Professor emeritus
- Known for: Development of rivastigmine (Exelon)
- Awards: Israel Prize (2014)

Marta Weinstock-Rosin (born 1935; Hebrew: מרתה וינשטוק-רוזין) is an Austrian-born Israeli neuropharmacologist, best known as the developer of rivastigmine (Exelon).

== Early life and education ==
Weinstock-Rosin was born in Vienna. After her father was arrested for being Jewish, the family fled Austria for England in 1939, shortly before the war. Her early days in England were difficult. Her father was arrested as a citizen of an enemy state, and her mother had no skills and didn't speak English. Food was a challenge to find and much of her time was spent in air raid shelters. At age 12 she looked up the word "pharmacologist" in an encyclopedia and decided that research, drug development and chemistry would be her career. She had to fight the system to succeed. She had to go to a boys class to study physics, as it wasn't offered in her girls school; also, her father disapproved of her medical plans, as he was afraid she would never get married. She received a PharmD and M.S. in pharmacology form University of London, followed by a Ph.D. in pharmacology from St. Mary's Hospital Medical School.

== Career ==
She lectured at University of London, but felt that as an Orthodox Jewish woman with children she faced prejudice from the English academic community and had limited career prospects. When passed over for a promotion she was told: "You are not one of us. You don't eat with us and never made it to Christmas parties." This prompted a move to Israel in 1969, joining the faculty at Tel Aviv University, and later to Hebrew University. She became a professor at Hebrew University in 1981 and head of its School of Pharmacy in 1983.

While studying the decreased respiratory effort caused by morphine (which lowers the brainstem acetylcholine level), Weinstock-Rosin found by "amazing coincidence" a drug, rivastigmine, that selectively increased acetylcholine levels in the frontal lobes. She soon realized this drug, a semi-synthetic derivative of physostigmine, found by accident, could be helpful for Alzheimer's disease, which has a specific decrease of acetylcholine in this same region. The drug was sold to Sandoz, now a part of Novartis. She tried to interest Teva, the only major Israeli drug maker at the time, but they were not interested. Weinstock-Rosin and the university were granted "fine royalties." The origin of the drug was kept secret, ostensibly because of the Arab boycott, and it was not until 1997 that Weinstock-Rosin received recognition for her discovery. It was developed and patented in 1985 and came into medical use as Exelon in 1997. Rivastigmine capsules, liquid solution and patches are used for the treatment of mild to moderate dementia of the Alzheimer's type, and in the UK for mild to moderate Parkinson's disease dementia. The drug slows cognitive decline and improves memory in affected patients. The drug was commercialized by Novartis with annual sales of $1 billion. After developing rivastigmine, her research focus turned to finding a preventative treatment for Alzheimer's.

Weinstock-Rosin won the 2014 Israel Prize for Medicine for her discovery of rivastigmine. In 2015 she was honored as one of the torchbearers in the national Israeli Independence Day ceremony.

In 2026, Weinstock-Rosin won the Bonei Zion Prize in the Lifetime Achievement category.

She is an emeritus professor at the Hebrew University's School of Pharmacy.

== Personal ==
Weinstock-Rosin is an Orthodox Jew. She married Arnold Rosin, an academic gerontologist, in 1960; they have four children and 20 grandchildren.
