= Asher Weill =

English-born Israeli editor and publisher

- אשר וייל
- Born: Anthony James Campbell Weill; May 30, 1936 (age 90)
- Occupations: Editor and publisher

Asher Weill (Hebrew: אשר וייל; born Anthony James Campbell Weill, May 30, 1936) is an English-born Israeli editor and publisher, who introduced western publishing standards to Israel and published the biographies and writings of a very large number of Israel's political leaders. He edited Ariel - The Israel Review of Arts and Letters for over 20 years. He was a founding director of the Jerusalem International Book Fair, the Israel Debating Society, and the Anglo-Israel Colloquium. Awards he has received include: Friend of Jerusalem (from the Jerusalem Book Fair) and the Bonei Zion Prize (from Nefesh beNefesh) in 2015 in recognition of his contribution to Israel's cultural and literary life for over 50 years.

== Personal ==
Weill was born in London on May 30, 1936, the son of Bernard Max Weill and Violet Miriam Cecil Weill née Afriat. His father's family moved from Germany to England at the end of the 19th century. His roots on his mother's side are both Moroccan Jewish and Scottish and Irish émigrés to Australia. Weill has five children from two marriages, and lives in Jerusalem.

== Early life ==
During World War II Weill lived variously in Kent, Cornwall and London, and was educated at Wisborough Lodge boarding school and the City of London School, where his speed in the swimming pool was identified. He was England swimming champion in 100 yards (91 meters) backstroke in 1956, and represented United Kingdom in the 1957 Maccabiah Games (Jewish Olympics) in Israel. He briefly studied Anthropology at London University before moving to Israel in 1958, where he first lived on Kibbutz Beit Hashita before settling in Jerusalem in 1959.

== Career ==
=== Career in UK ===
Weill started working for Oxford University Press in 1955 as editor of books for English language teaching, and was subsequently responsible for overseas publicity for educational books.

=== Career in Israel ===
==== Publishing ====
In 1959 Weill was appointed sales director and subsequently director of publishing for the Israel Program for Scientific Translations (IPST), then part of the Prime Minister's Office. The program used the scientific and language knowledge of immigrants to Israel to translate scientific publications from the Soviet bloc with which the scientific world in the west was not familiar. During that time he founded and served as the publisher of Israel Universities Press, a publishing imprint of IPST. He introduced western publishing standards to Israel, including graphically-designed hard covers and a standard sales price.

In 1969 he became the managing director and publisher of Weidenfeld and Nicolson Jerusalem. That was closed down in the wake of the recession that hit Israel after the 1973 Yom Kippur war. In 1975, Weill became the founder and partner with the Yediot Aharonot newspaper of Edanim Publishers, a Hebrew-language publishing house. He remained in partnership with Yediot Aharonot until 1993. During the years 1969–1993, Weill was the publisher of a very large number of Israel's leaders, among them, Chaim Herzog, Moshe Dayan, Shimon Peres, Golda Meir, Isser Harel, Yigael Yadin, Ezer Weizman, Abba Eban, Yitzhak Shamir, Adin Steinsaltz, Natan Sharansky and Teddy Kollek, as well as international figures, among them, Anwar Sadat, Henry Kissinger and Nancy and Ronald Reagan.

==== Publishing-related activities ====
In 1961, Weill was a founding director of the Jerusalem International Book Fair and remained on the board for some 50 years. From 1967–2002, he bi-annually published the Israel Book Trade Directory, and in 2001, wrote and published a history of the Fair. From 1962–1975, he served as chair of the Israel Export Institute's Book and Printing Center.

==== Teaching publishing ====
From 1993–2001, Weill developed and taught a course, The Theory and Practice of Publishing, at Israel's Open University.

==== Arts and culture in Israel ====
In 1981, Weill was appointed editor of the quarterly magazine Ariel: The Israel Review of Arts and Letters, published by the Israel Ministry of Foreign Affairs in English, French, German, Spanish, Arabic and Russian, with special editions in many other languages, among them Chinese, Japanese and Italian. Ariel was the main channel for Israel to showcase to the world its rich cultural life. The magazine was closed down by the ministry in 2003 as a cost-cutting move.

==== Jewish media ====
From 1986–1991, Weill worked as director of the Press Division of the World Zionist Organization, in which capacity he was the editor of the monthly news magazine, Israel Scene; the World Zionist Press Service, Kivunim, Sabra, Jerusalem Update, and other WZO publications.

==== Contribution to publications ====
Weill has written, edited or contributed to a large variety of additional publications, among them Encyclopaedia Judaica, Insight Guide to Israel and to Jerusalem, Political Dictionary of the Middle East, Encyclopaedia of Zionism, Blackwell Companion to Jewish Culture, Biography of Jewish History and World Biography of Jewish Women.

==== Other professional activities ====
Since 1995, Weill has been the convener and Israeli coordinator of The Anglo-Israel Colloquium; a biennial gathering of Israeli and British leaders on a selected topic, and continues to work as an editor and publisher of academic and non-academic material.

Since 2010, Weill has been responsible for all the English-language material of Limmud FSU, an adaptation for the Russian-speaking Jewish community of the Limmud peer-led Jewish educational programming that started in UK in 1980. Limmud FSU reaches out to Jews throughout the former Soviet Union, as well as to Russian-speaking Jews in Israel, USA, Canada, Australia and other countries.

== Public activities ==
From 1977 Weill performed voluntary military service in Melach which ensures the ongoing functioning of civilian life in times of crisis and war. For the first decade he served in Mevaseret Zion (a small town outside Jerusalem), where he set up the framework at the request of the mayor. In 1987, he was responsible for establishing Melach's first network for public information, in the Jerusalem region. He retired from that capacity in 2016.

In 1995, Weill was a co-founder of "Siah VaSig", the Israeli Debating society, which introduced the art of debate and public speaking into schools and universities in Israel, and which sends teams to international debating competitions.

He is a member of the executive of the B'nai B'rith World Center, Jerusalem, and chair of the jury of the annual B'nai B'rith World Center's Matsdorf Prize for Excellence in Reporting on the Diaspora.

== Sport ==
In 2022, he took part in the swimming competition as part of the XXI Maccabiah Games. He took third place in the 100m and fifth place in the 50m backstroke.
