= Leah Abramowitz =

Israeli gerontologist

Leah Abramowitz is the co-founder of Melabev, an organization for dementia patients in Israel which has ten centers in Jerusalem and more in surrounding areas. She opened Melabev in 1981 with geriatrics Professor Arnold Rosin to offer day services to Alzheimer’s patients who needed special care. Abramowitz started the Institute for the Study of Aging at Shaare Zedek Medical Center as well which offers courses, seminars and workshops for training professionals. In 2008 she received Jerusalem’s highest civilian honor, the Yekirat Yerushalayim award. In 2019 she was awarded the Sylan Adams Nefesh B’Nefesh Bonei Zion Prize.
