= Hagai Levine =

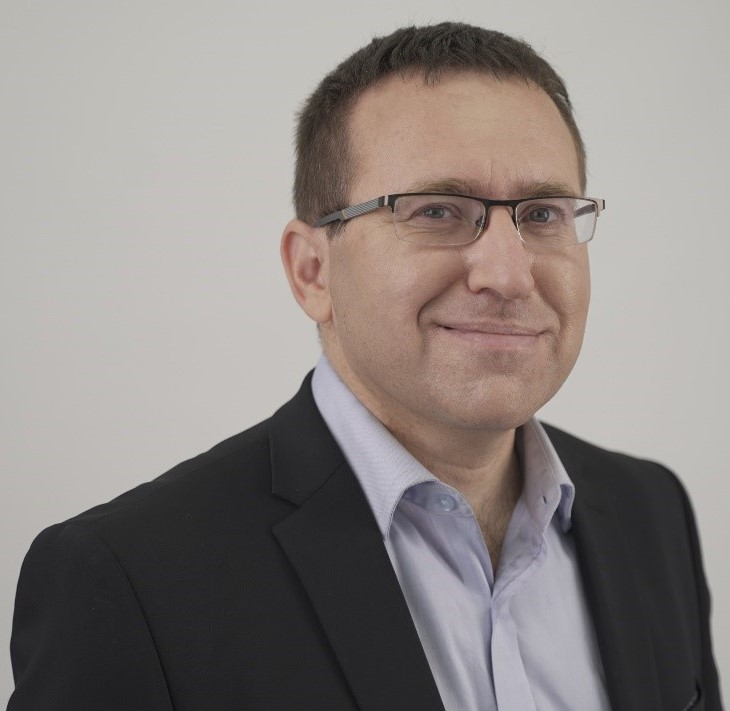
Levine in 2021

Hagai Levine (Hebrew: חגי לוין) is an Israeli public health physician and epidemiologist. Until 2021, Levine was the chairman of Israel's association of Public Health Physicians. He left to help Moshe Ya'alon and Telem "bring 'security and hope' to Israel" again". The Association announced Nadav Davidovitch would serve as interim chairman. Levine explained his reasons for leaving in a letter to Chezy Levy, the Director-General of the Ministry of Health, and Nachman Ash, who was the country's Coronavirus Commissioner, was due to his concerns over their lack of leadership in dealing with the COVID-19 pandemic in Israel.

Levine is on the faculty of the Braun School of Public Health and Community Medicine which is part of the Hebrew University of Jerusalem.

== Education ==
Levine earned a Bachelor of Medical Sciences degree, with honors, from the Hadassah School of Medicine at the Hebrew University of Jerusalem in 1999. He went on to earn a BA, with distinction, also at Hebrew University, where he further earned his medical degree (2003). He did his medical residency from 2005 until 2010 with Israel Defense Forces' Medical Corps and earned a MPH magna cum laude at the Sackler Faculty of Medicine, Tel Aviv University, in 2010.

== Research ==
In 2017, Levine published the results of an international study that concluded sperm counts in men had dropped by 59.3% since 1973. Levine, who at the time was head of the Environmental Health Track at Nraun, co-led the study with Shanna Swan of New York City’s Icahn School of Medicine at Mount Sinai.
