= Nof Ayalon =

Community settlement in central Israel

Nof Ayalon: נוֹף אַיָּלוֹן (Hebrew)
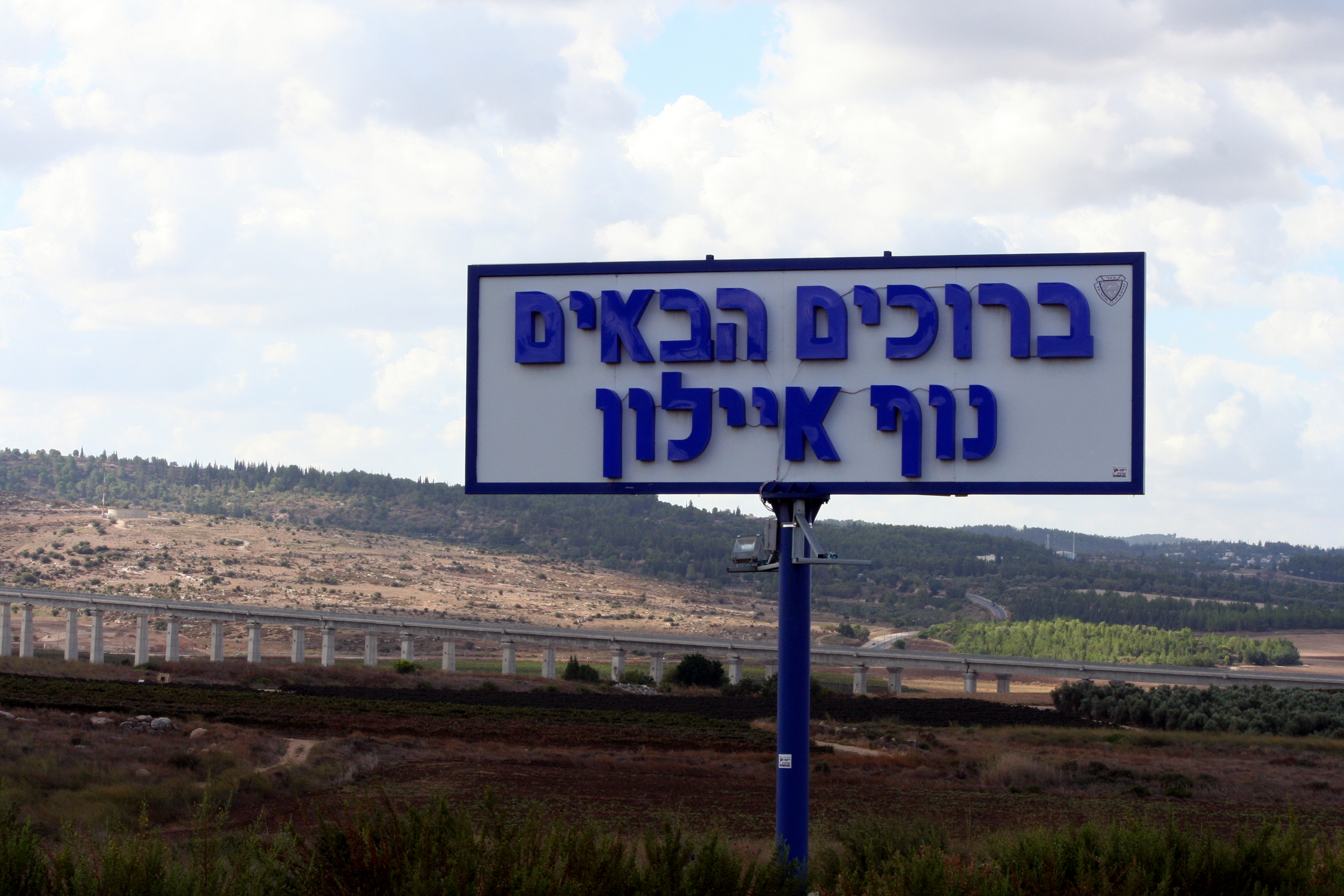

- Location within Jerusalem District
- Coordinates: 31°52′16″N 34°59′28″E
- Country: Israel
- District: Central
- Subdistrict: Ramla
- Council: Gezer
- Founded: 1994
- Founder: Yeshivat Sha'alvim
- Population (2024): 1,900

Nof Ayalon (Hebrew: נוֹף אַיָּלוֹן, lit. 'Ayalon View') is a community settlement in central Israel. Located in the Ayalon Valley near Sha'alvim, it falls under the jurisdiction of the Gezer Regional Council. In 2024, it had a population of 1,900.

== History ==
During the Ottoman period, the area belonged to the Nahiyeh (sub-district) of Lod that encompassed the area of the present-day city of Modi'in-Maccabim-Re'ut in the south to the present-day city of El'ad in the north, and from the foothills in the east, through the Lod Valley to the outskirts of Jaffa in the west. This area was home to thousands of inhabitants in about 20 villages, who had at their disposal tens of thousands of hectares of prime agricultural land.

The locality was established in 1994 by the administration of Yeshivat Sha'alvim.

== Notable residents ==
- Rachelle Fraenkel, teacher of rabbinic literature, yoetzet halacha
- Naftali Fraenkel, 16-year-old son of Rachelle Fraenkel killed in the 2014 kidnapping and murder of Israeli teenagers
- Matanyahu Englman, State Comptroller and Ombudsman
