= Shimon Glick =

American-born Israeli physician (born 1932)

Shimon (Seymour) M. Glick (Hebrew: שמעון גליק; born 1932) is an American-born Israeli physician.

== Personal life ==
Glick was born in New Jersey. He and his wife Brenda have six children including Yehuda Glick who is a rabbi and former Knesset member.

== Career ==
Glick is a graduate of SUNY Downstate Medical Center.

- He did his medical training (internship, residency) at Yale University Medical Center
- Residency Mount Sinai Hospital Internal Medicine in New York.
- Research fellow, Endocrinology, at the Bronx Veterans Administration Hospital in the laboratory of Berson and Yalow (Nobel Laureate).
- First to measure Growth Hormone – with Jesse Roth MD
- Before moving to Israel in 1974, Glick was Chief of Medical Services at the Coney Island Hospital in Brooklyn
- Clinical Professor of Medicine at Downstate Medical Center.
- Gussie Krupp Chair of Internal Medicine – 1980
- Chairman of Department of Medicine Soroka Medical Center, Beer Sheba, Israel
- President of Israel Society of Endocrinology
- Dean of Ben Gurion University School of Heath Sciences 1986–1990
- Director of the Lord Immanuel Jakobavitz Center
- Ombudsman of Israel Health ministry
- Director of Prywes Center for Medical Education – Ben Gurion University
- Distinguished Citizen Award Beer Sheba 2012
- He is considered a world leader in Medical Ethics and Medical Education

== Awards and honors ==
- 2014 Bonei Zion (Builders of Zion) Prize
- Member of the Institute of Medicine of the National Academy of Sciences of the United States
- 2004 - Lifelong Achievement Award - Israel Health Ministry
- 2012 - Lifelong Achievement Award - Israel Society of Internal Medicine
- 2014 - Lifelong Achievement Award - "Bonei Zion" Nefesh BeNefesh

== Works ==
- Immunoassay of Human Growth Hormone in Plasma (August 1963), authored together with doctors Jesse Roth, Rosalyn S. Yalow & Solomon A. Berson.
- Loss of Antigen-Antibody Affinity with Storage of Antiserum at —20 C (September 1973)
