= Harold Simon =

South African pilot (1920–2022)

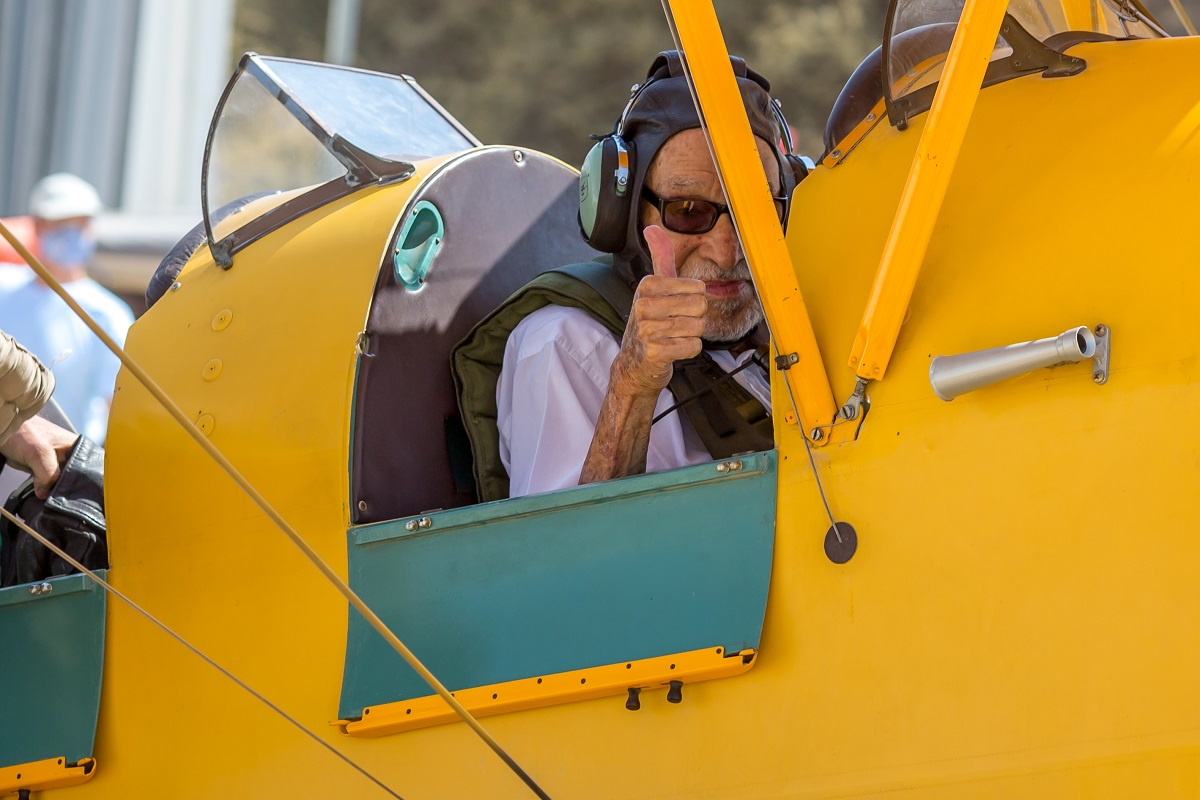
Harold Simon in 2020

Harold Simon (Hebrew: הרולד סימון; 24 April 1920 – 28 February 2022), nicknamed Smoky Simon, was a South African pilot who helped in the creation of the Israeli Air Force.

== Biography ==
Born in the Orange Free State, South Africa, to a father from Lithuania, then part of Kovno Governorate, Vilna Governorate and Suwałki Governorate, Russia, and a mother from England, he grew up in South Africa. He studied accounting and commerce at the University of Witwatersrand and volunteered in 1941 to join the South African Air Force, serving as a navigator and bombardier.

He returned to Johannesburg after the war, worked as an accountant and married Myra Weinberg. Three weeks after their wedding, in May 1948, they moved to Israel to assist with the War of Independence and both joined the Israeli Air Force. Simon was recruited to be a navigator and bombardier. In June 1948 he became the IAF’s chief of operations and participated in 24 reconnaissance and bombing missions. He stayed in Israel after the war and was discharged from the IAF in 1950 as a major.

In 1962 Simon started the Simon and Wiesel Insurance Agency which specialized in life insurance. He sold the portfolios to Migdal insurance agency in 2000. He was Chairman of World Machal since 1968 and was a founding member of the Menachem Begin Heritage Foundation in Jerusalem. He received the TELFED 2014 Lifetime Achievement Award for his service to Israel. His involvement in the founding of the State of Israel was featured in the movie Above and Beyond. In 2019, he was awarded the Sylvan Adams Bonei Zion Prize, which honors English-speaking immigrants to Israel who have made significant societal contributions.

Simon died on 28 February 2022, at the age of 101.
