= Malke Bina =

Founder of Matan Women's Institute for Torah Studies

- מלכה בינה
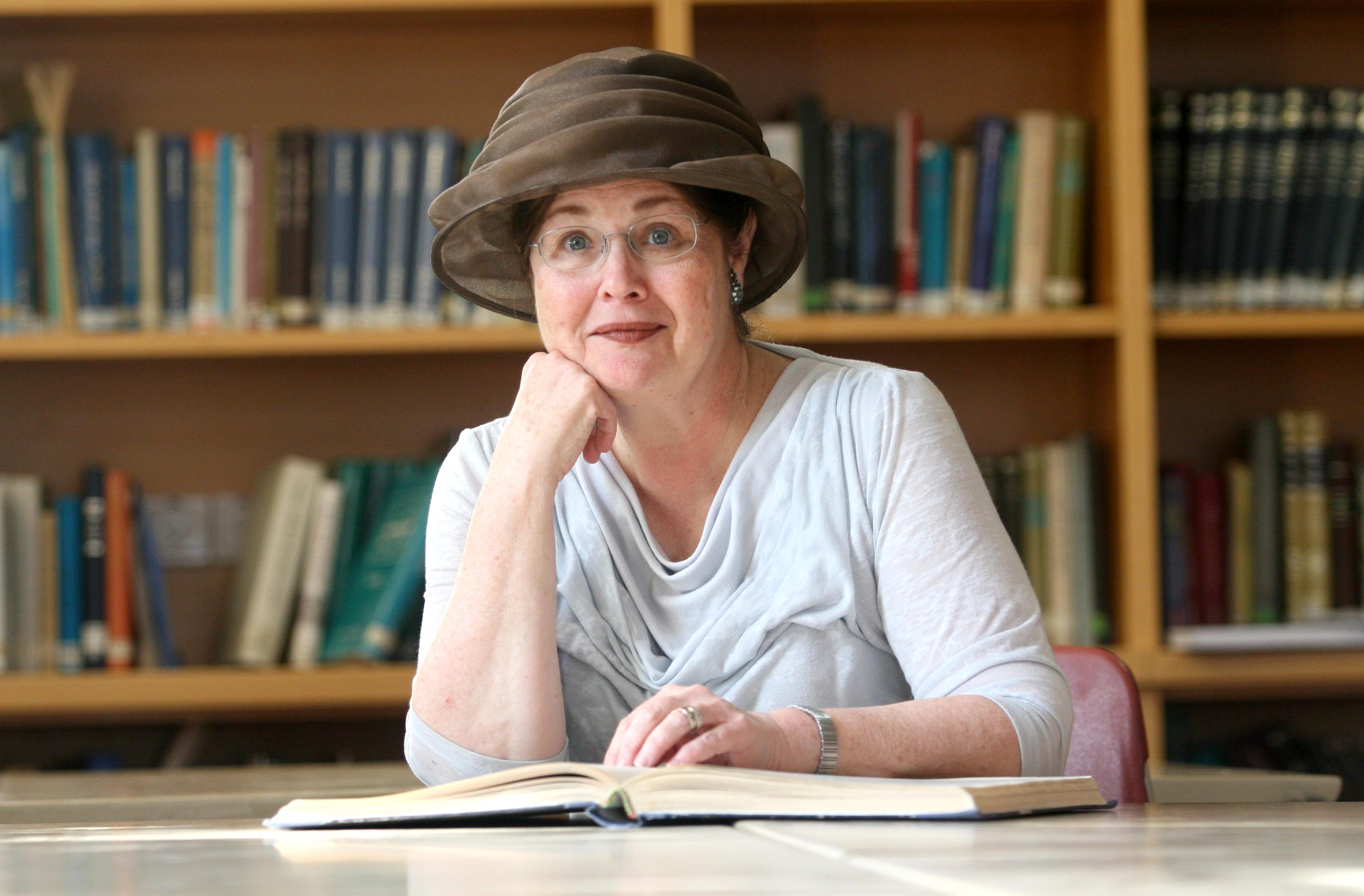
- Malke Bina, 2008
- Born: 1950 (age 75–76)

Malke Bina (Hebrew: מלכה בינה) is an American rabbanit and the founder and first teacher of Matan Women's Institute for Torah Studies. She has a master's degree in Hebrew Bible from Yeshiva University. She is married to a rabbi (who serves on Matan's Council of Rabbis) and is called by the term Rabbanit, which is less common in Modern Orthodox circles. She was interviewed by JOFA in 2006 and serves on its Council of Advisers. She is known for advocating for women's reading and study of Jewish texts.

In 2022, Bar Ilan University awarded Bina with an honorary doctorate.

== Education ==
Rabbanit Bina attended a Bais Yaakov school in Baltimore where she did not study Mishna or Gemara. Immediately after the Six Day War Bina went to Israel to attend the Jerusalem Michlala, where she studied Mishna

After meeting her husband, Rabbi Aharon Bina and moving to America, Bina completed a Masters program in Bible and History at Revel at Yeshiva University in 1972. It was in this program that she learned various sugyot of Gemara.

== MaTaN ==
Rabbanit Bina is the Founder and Director of MaTaN, the focus of which is on women's Torah study, and learning Talmud, Tanakh and Halakha.

She says, “My goal was to open up an institution B'H that would welcome any woman who wanted to come to study. The dream was not just to provide adult education for women, including high level Talmud studies, but to create a strong beit midrash that would be a wellspring for future female religious leaders...We wanted the learning at MaTaN to be a mainstream activity for post high school religious women who would devote themselves to Torah Lishma (Torah for its own sake), not necessarily for a degree. I consider that it took 10 years for MaTaN to become mainstream and no longer be peripheral. Originally there were 4 to 6 women in the beit midrash. Now we have 22 women in a three-year Talmud program, and 20 in the Tanakh program. These are women from other areas of study who spend between one to three years at MaTaN...The emphasis at MaTaN is on study as a religious act, but always combined with high intellectual goals...At MaTaN we try to stress that learning should be new and fresh and exciting every day—the stress on hayom (today).”

Rabbi Mike Feuer, Educational Director of Yeshivat Sulam Yaakov in Nachlaot, told the Jewish Press, “[Teaching women Torah] is definitely not the definition of the issur (prohibition] any longer…The world has shifted...This just needs to happen – it’s not forbidden even if it may not be recommended traditionally... I see a place like Matan as trying to carve out a space of respect for women’s Torah… The playing field on which men win each other’s respect is the Gemara, and this is the expression of old school feminism, which is that a woman ought to be able to do what a man does.”

== JOFA ==
Bina is on the Advisory Council of JOFA, the Jewish Orthodox Feminist Alliance, a grassroots non-profit organization established in 1997 to educate and advocate for women's increased participation in Orthodox Jewish life and to create a community for women and men dedicated to such change.

Bina was interviewed by Rachelle Isserow in an article entitled “Creating New Leaders: Interview with Malke Bina, Founder and Director of MaTaN” which was published in The JOFA Journal of the Winter of 2006. In the interview Bina discussed how and why MaTaN was founded, its mission, and its plan for the future.

Bina attended JOFA's “Second International Conference on Feminism and Orthodoxy: Exploring the Impact of Feminist Values on Traditional Jewish Life” in In February 1998 and JOFA's “Fifth International Conference on Feminism & Orthodoxy: Zachar u’Neqevah Bara Otam: Women and Men in Partnership” in February 2004.

== Honors and awards ==
Bina has received the following awards:

- In 2002 the Hadassah Women's prize for her important work, along with Shoshana Damari and Orah Namir.
- In 2006 the Honorary Doctorate from Yeshiva University for her work in teaching Torah to women, aliyah, education and social services.
- In 2008 honored as Emunah's Woman of the Year.
- In 2014 the Bonei Zion Prize.
