= Jerusalem International Book Forum =

Jerusalem International Book Forum פורום הספר הבינלאומי בירושלים
- Status: Active
- Genre: Trade fair, literary festival
- Frequency: Biennial (every second year)
- Venue: International Convention Center (Binyanei Ha'Uma) and other venues
- Location: Jerusalem
- Country: Israel
- Years active: 1963–present
- Inaugurated: 1963; 63 years ago
- Founder: Asher Weill
- Website: www.jbookforum.com

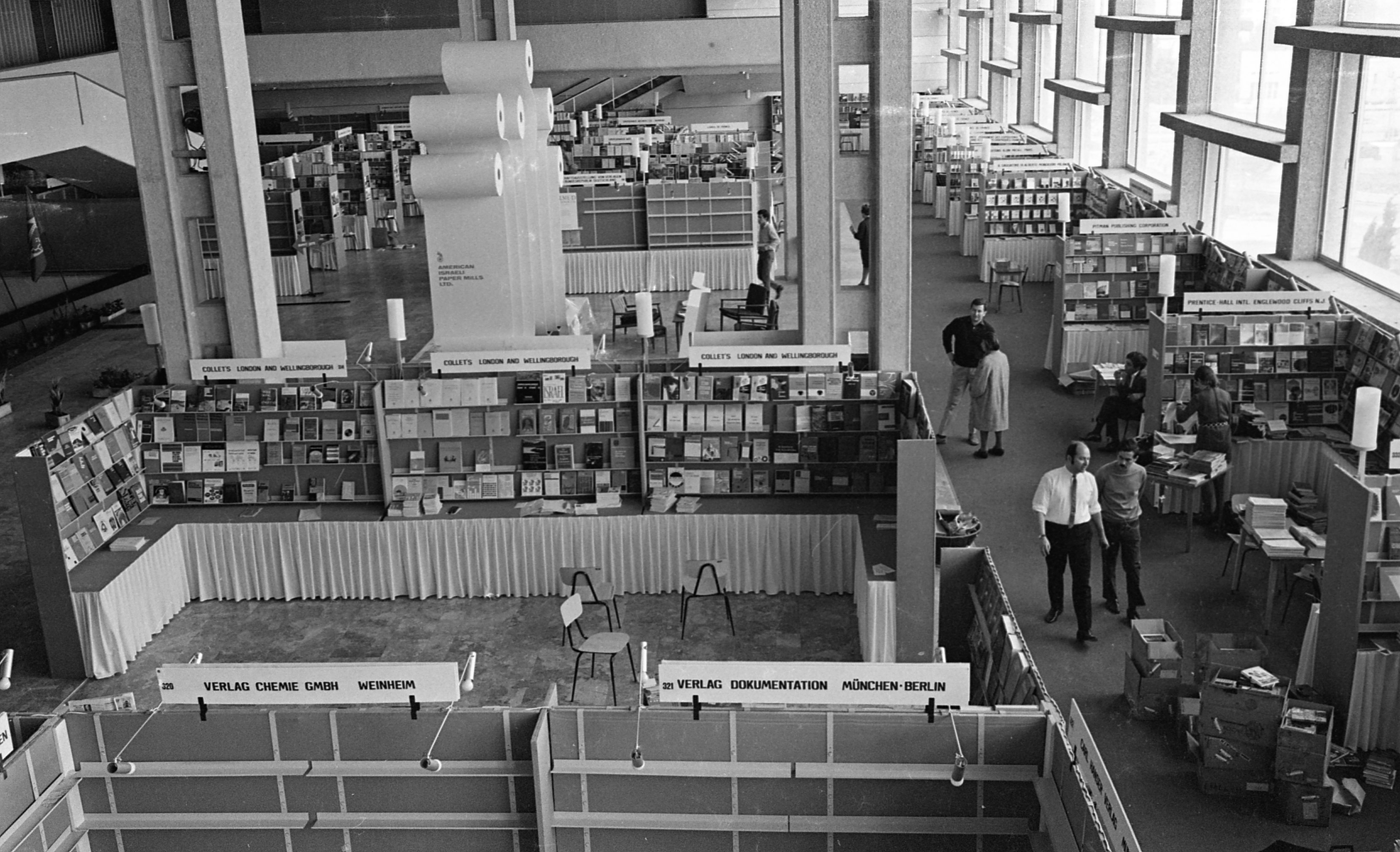
The fourth Jerusalem book fair, in the International Convention Center, 1969

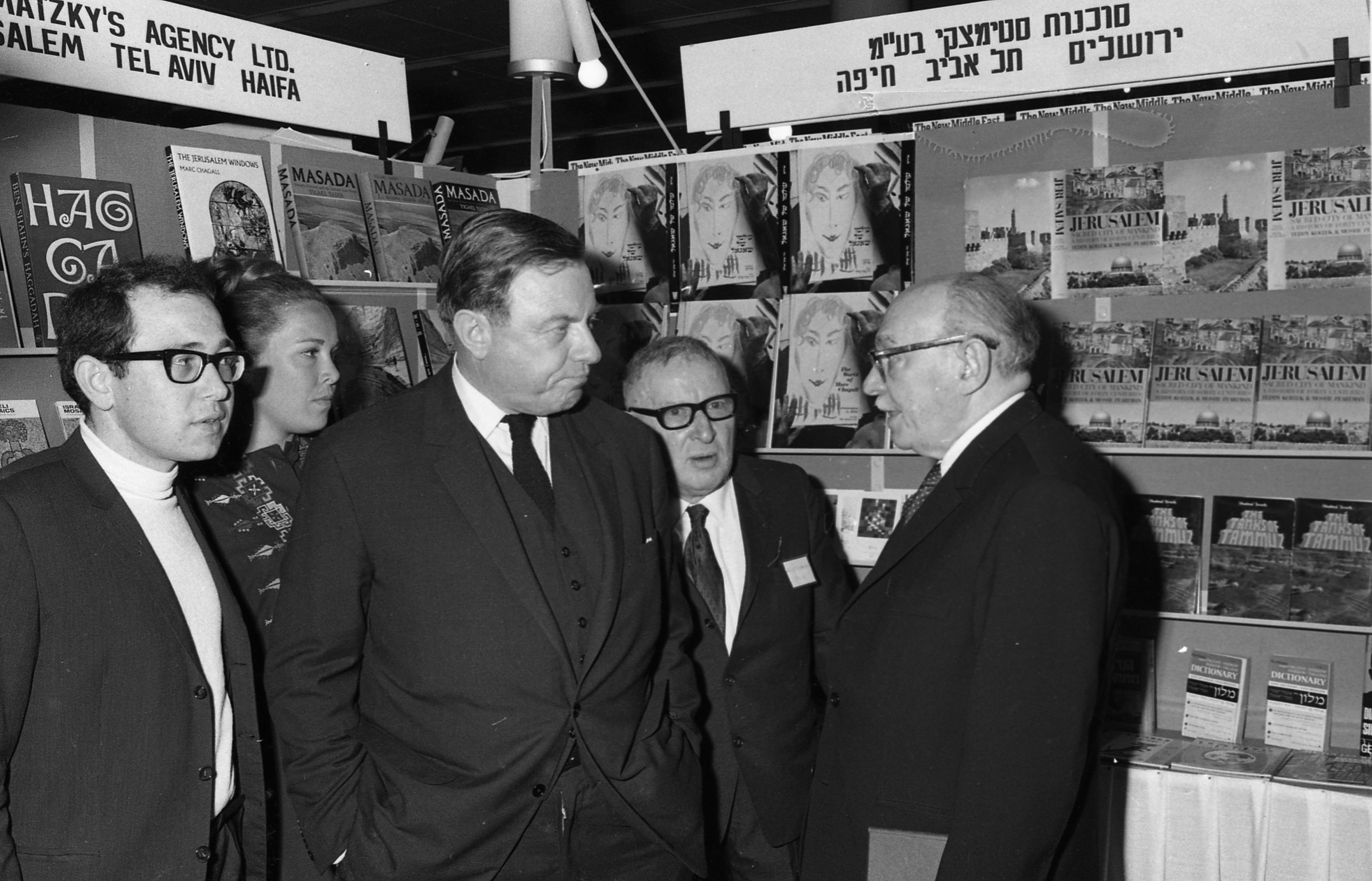
Teddy Kollek (center) visits the Steimatzky stand at the 1969 Jerusalem International Book Fair. Eri Steimatzky is on the right.

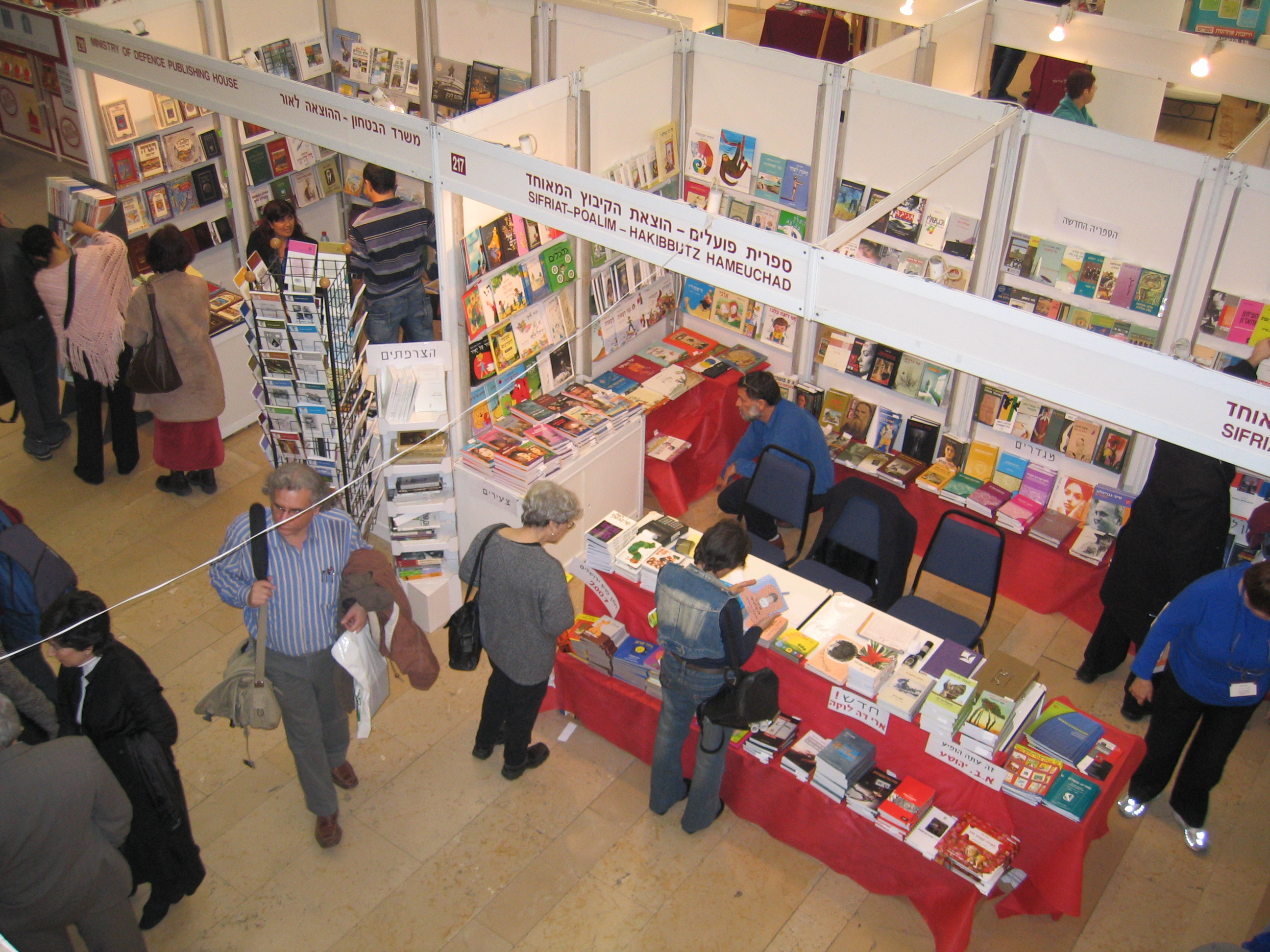
The 2006 Jerusalem International Book Fair

The Jerusalem International Book Forum (JIBF; Hebrew: פורום הספר הבינלאומי בירושלים), previously known as the Jerusalem International Book Fair, is a business fair and literary festival co-founded by Asher Weill in 1963. It takes place in Jerusalem every second year, and hosts the awarding of the Jerusalem Prize.

== Location ==
The Fair was annually held in Jerusalem's International Convention Center (Binyanei Hauma) from 1963 until 2015. Since 2015 it is spread across a number of cultural institutions supported by the Jerusalem Foundation, such as Mishkenot Sha'ananim, the Jerusalem Cinematheque and Khan Theatre.

In 2019, the name of the event was changed from the Jerusalem International Book Fair to the Jerusalem International Book Forum.

== Awards ==
The JIBF hosts the award of the Jerusalem Prize to a writer whose work best expresses and promotes the idea of the freedom of the individual in society. The prize was awarded to the American playwright Arthur Miller in 2003 and to the British writer Ian McEwan in 2011; moreover it has been awarded to five writers who afterwards received the Nobel Prize for literature.
