= Michal Alberstein =

Israeli legal scholar

- מיכל אלברשטיין
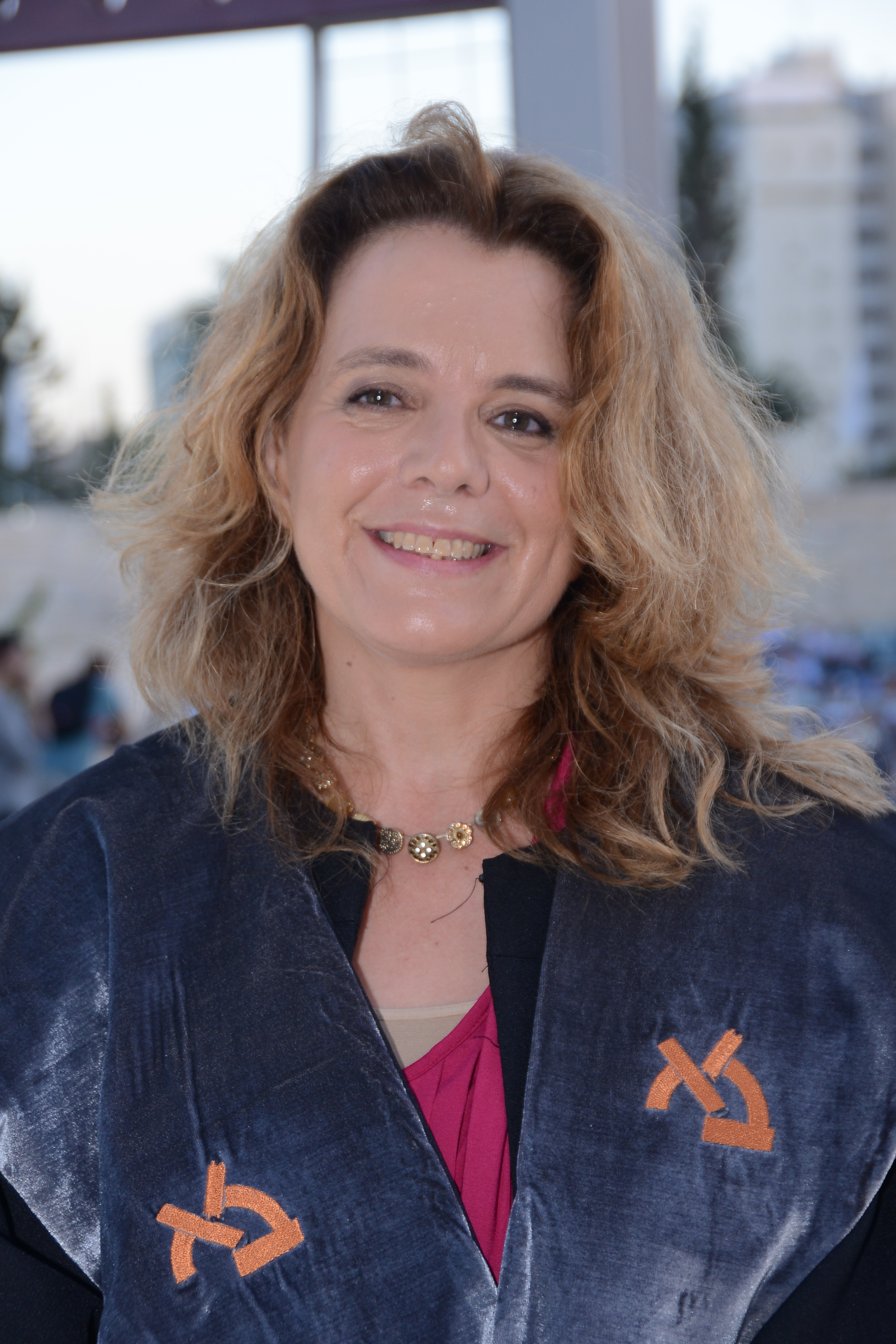
- Born: January 9, 1969 (age 57); Tel Aviv, Israel
- Education: Tel Aviv University, Harvard Law School
- Occupations: Legal Scholar, Dean of The Faculty of Law at Bar-Ilan University
- Known for: Conflict resolution, legal formalism, judicial conflict resolution

Michal Alberstein (Hebrew: מיכל אלברשטיין; born January 9, 1969, at Tel-Aviv) is an expert in the field of conflict resolution and reconstruction of legal thought. Alberstein is the Dean of The Faculty of Law, Bar-Ilan University, the Primary Investigator on an ERC consolidator grant to study Judicial Conflict Resolution (JCR) and the academic chairperson of “Israeli hope” project, supported by the president of Israel and High Council of Education.

== Biography ==
Alberstein was born and raised in Tel Aviv to a Jewish modern orthodox family, she served in the army as a nature guide of the Society for Protection of Nature in the southern town Sderot. Alberstein graduated cum laude from Tel Aviv University with an LLB and BA in philosophy in 1993. She wrote an LLM thesis and SJD dissertation at under the supervision of Professor Duncan Kennedy, one of the leaders of the Critical Legal Studies (CLS) movement. Since 2000 she has been a faculty member at the Law Faculty of Bar Ilan University. and since 2022 is the Dean. Alberstein has three children and two grandchildren.

== Research ==
Alberstein studies the intellectual foundations and reconstructions of legal thought and conflict resolution. In the framework of the ongoing debate on the evolving nature of law, she has formulated measures of legal formalism to follow changes in judicial rhetoric over time. She probes the foundations of law and their change over time using multiple lenses, such as legal formalism; identity-based conflict resolution; models and schools of mediation; intersections of public health and law; hybrids of non-adversarial justice; and conflict resolution in the shadow of authority. She is the author and co-editor of more than 70 publications in English and Hebrew, including five books.

In the field of conflict resolution, she developed a broad perspective on various alternative movements, including alternative dispute resolution, restorative justice, transitional justice and therapeutic jurisprudence. She offered a meta-theory for the field of conflict resolution, demonstrating how various conflict resolution practices are based on six organizing narratives that reflect reconstructions of critique in Western culture: emphasis on process, constructive and forward-thinking perspectives, emphasis on the hidden layer, hybridization and management, emphasis on emotions and relationships, and anti-authoritarian bottom-up work. Following receipt of an ERC consolidator grant that enabled her to establish an international research team to conduct a comparative interdisciplinary research project on the changing roles of judges in an age of vanishing trials, Alberstein and her team unveiled the reconstruction of the courts and the judiciary in light of the interest in more effective legal systems, together with the inspiration of notions of conflict resolution as manifested by the Alternative Dispute Resolution (ADR) movement. They exposed common trends of abbreviated trials and alternative doors which transform legal systems both in continental and common law cultures, and provided new empirical and theoretical foundations for capturing comparatively the erosion of adjudication as the mainstream legal process to decide facts and norms. Her research has resulted in policy recommendations for more accurate data collection and increased informed litigants’ choice in court administration.

In the field of jurisprudence and legal formalism, her research provides a link between critical schools and judicial practice. She outlines a theoretical model which, based on existing jurisprudential and critical claims, constructs nine measures of formalism. Instead of assuming that narratives of critique stay outside legal practice, she searches for their implementation within legal rhetoric. She assumes that judges’ contemporary rhetoric in formulating legal cases reflects an internalization of critical claims that appear and develop in legal thought. After using this measure in a qualitative mode, she has been testing it empirically with the help of an Israeli Science Foundation (ISF) grant, comparing different judges’ levels of formalism, and taking into account the different fields of law and types of conflicts brought before the court. This type of research can also be extended comparatively to address multiple legal systems and other instances.

== Books and Publications ==
- Jurisprudence of Mediation (University of Haifa Press and Magnes) 2007.
- Trauma and Memory: Reading, Healing and Making Law (Michal Alberstein, Nadav Davidovitch & Austin Sarat eds.) (Stanford University Press, 2007)

=== Articles ===
- Michal Alberstein, Forms of Mediation and Law: Cultures of Dispute Resolution, 22 Ohio State Journal on Dispute Resolution 321 (2007)
- Michal Alberstein and Jay Rothman, Individuals, Groups, Intergroups: Theorizing about The Role of Identity in Conflicts, 28 Ohio State Journal on Dispute Resolution 631 (2013)
- Michal Alberstein, Judicial Conflict Resolution (JCR): A New Jurisprudence for Emerging Judicial Practice 16 Cardozo Law Journal of Conflict Resolution (2015) 1.
- Michal Alberstein and Béatrice Coscas-Wiliams, A Patchwork of doors: Accelerated Proceedings in Continental Criminal Justice systems 22 New Criminal Law Review. 585 (2019).

== Honors and Public Service ==
She has received the 2020 Fernard Braudel Senior Fellowship at the European University Institute (EUI) Fiesole in Florence; the 2017 Fattal prize for distinguished legal scholar under the age of 50 in Israeli academia; the Bar Ilan University rector prize for significant academic achievement 2016; and the 2001-2004 Alon scholarship for excellent scientists. She has served in various public positions including the following: the Academic Director of eight legal clinics; the Academic Chairperson at the Bar Ilan University, supported by the President of Israel and High Council of Education; the Sexual Harassment Commissioner of the university between 2015 and 2018; Senate member; High Nomination Committee member; Director of an interdisciplinary graduate program on Conflict Resolution and Negotiation (2011–2015); and Director of an international summer program on Identity-based Conflict Resolution.

== External links and publications ==
- Faculty website: Alberstein Michal | Faculty of Law
- ERC research site: JCR Collaboratory
- Open access publications: Zenodo
- Media: ERC Judicial Conflict Resolution - YouTube
- SSRN Author page: Author Page for Michal Alberstein :: SSRN
- Academic ID: Michal Alberstein (0000-0001-7583-3558)
