= Eliezer Jaffe =

American sociologist and activist

Eliezer David Jaffe (Hebrew: אליעזר דוד יפה; 10 November 1933 – 25 May 2017) was an Israeli professor of social work specializing in philanthropy and non-profit management. He was Professor Emeritus at The Hebrew University's Paul Baerwald School of Social Work and Social Welfare.

== Biography ==
Eliezer Jaffe was born in Cleveland Ohio. He came to Israel in 1957 as a volunteer, working in the ma'abarot (immigrant transit camps). He returned to the US to complete his education, obtaining degrees in sociology, psychology, and criminology, and a doctorate in social work. Jaffe immigrated to Israel in 1960 and helped to found Israel's first academic school of social work, the Paul Baerwald School of Social Work at the Hebrew University of Jerusalem. He has been a consultant to the Israel Ministry of Labor and Social Affairs and has served on several ministerial committees, including the Prime Minister's Committee on Children and Disadvantaged Youth (under Golda Meir), the Prime Minister's Council on Social Welfare Policy (under Shimon Peres and Yitzhak Shamir), the President's Committee on Outstanding Volunteers (under Chaim Herzog), and the committee to Determine Israel's Poverty Line (under Menachem Begin). Between 1970 and 1972, at the request of Mayor Teddy Kollek, he headed the Jerusalem Municipal Department of Family and Community Services, introducing major administrative, conceptual and program reforms, all of which have since been adopted nationwide.

== Academic career ==
Jaffe's research focused on social services to children and families, ethnic stereotypes, and on the nonprofit sector and philanthropy in Israel. He studies and teaches about inter-country adoptions, nonprofit organization management, fundraising, and private philanthropy in Israel, and has conducted research on culturally sensitive practice, ethnic stereotypes among Israelis and public access to information regarding nonprofit organizations in Israel. He helped promote and write the new Israeli law on inter-country adoptions.

Jaffe was the author of 14 books. He was a member of the editorial board of Israel's social work journal, Society and Welfare; served on the editorial board of the international journal Public Management; and was a member of the National Council on Social Work. He was a consultant to the Rothschild Foundation and other foundations and private philanthropists in Israel and abroad.

He was the first Centraid-L. Jacques Menard Professor for the Study of Nonprofit Organizations, Volunteering and Philanthropy at the Paul Baerwald School of Social Work of The Hebrew University of Jerusalem and co-chairman (with Ralph Goldman) of the Center for the Study of Philanthropy at the Hebrew University of Jerusalem.

== Social activism ==
Jaffe suggested the twinning concept in Project Renewal, whereby Jewish community federations worldwide and private philanthropists abroad link-up and twin directly in partnerships with specific disadvantaged neighborhoods in Israel. He was a co-founder of Zahavi - The Israel Association of Large Families, was a member of the Central Committee of the Israel Association of Social Workers, Chairman of the Israel Association of Academic Social Workers, advisor to social action groups of new immigrants and other disadvantaged Israelis. He was the first Chairman of the Israel Committee of the New Israel Fund (which he left when the organization became political), and Chairman of the Academic Council of the International Sephardi Education Fund (ISEF) and founding member of the Israel Association of Professional Fundraisers.

In 1990, he founded The Israel Free Loan Association (IFLA) to provide interest free loans for new immigrants and other needy "working poor" Israelis, which he serves as honorary president. In 2020 IFLA was renamed Ogen (Hebrew for “anchor”) symbolizing its strength and financial security. Through 2023 Ogen has provided more than 70,000 interest free and low interest revolving loans totaling more than $380,000,000 to individuals, families, small businesses, and non-profits as well as financial education across the entire demography and geography of Israel.

== Published works ==
In 2000, Jaffe published a second edition of his book "Giving Wisely: The Israel Guide to Nonprofit and Volunteer Organizations". This was followed shortly after with his book "Sources of Funding: The Israel Foundation Directory". While working at the School of Social Work at The Hebrew University of Jerusalem, he conceptualized and created the website "Giving Wisely" that contained the content of both books and much additional material, in English and Hebrew. It contained nearly 30,000 full and partial profiles of Israeli nonprofit organizations and foundations. The site, Giving Wisely: The Internet Directory of Israeli Nonprofit and Philanthropic Organizations, was acclaimed by the Israeli and foreign press, donors and researchers in Israel and abroad, Israelis seeking services, and nonprofit organizations and foundations for contributing to the development and transparency of the Israeli nonprofit sector. The website closed in 2011 when its original goal was accomplished of getting government and private foundations to create a permanent "GuideStar -Israel" website, bringing transparency to the nonprofit Sector in Israel.

== Awards and recognition ==
Jaffe received the President of Israel's Citation for Outstanding Volunteer Activity in 1996, the Sederot Conference award for contribution to Israeli society, and the Mayor of Jerusalem Award for Outstanding Nonprofit Association Leadership. He also received the Bernard Revel Memorial Award, presented annually to the most outstanding scholar and community leader among the alumni of Yeshiva University. In 2011 he received the Speaker of the Knesset Prize for improving the quality of life in Israel. In 2012 he received the Yakir Yerushalayim Distinguished Citizen of Jerusalem award. In 2017, shortly before his death, Jaffe was one of the recipients of the Bonei Zion Prize awarded by Nefesh B’Nefesh to immigrants from English-speaking countries.
