= Braun School of Public Health and Community Medicine =

The Hebrew University-Hadassah Braun School of Public Health and Community Medicine is a public health school in Israel affiliated with the Hebrew University of Jerusalem and Hadassah Medical Center.

== History ==
Braun School of Public Health and Community Medicine was founded in 1961. It was the country's first public health school. The school offers a one year International Master of Health program in English. The program has over 1000 graduates from 100 countries.

== Notable faculty ==
- Irit Cohen-Manheim PhD
- Hagai Levine
- Ora Paltiel
