= Avivah Gottlieb Zornberg =

Israeli Torah scholar (born 1944)

- אביבה גוטליב זורנברג
- Born: March 1944 (age 81–82); London, England

Academic background
- Education: Cambridge University (PhD)

Academic work
- Discipline: Torah studies

Avivah Gottlieb Zornberg (Hebrew: אביבה גוטליב זורנברג; born March 1944) is a Scottish contemporary Torah scholar and author.

== Biography ==
She was born in London, England, grew up in Glasgow, Scotland, and moved to Israel in 1969, where she currently resides in Jerusalem. Zornberg's father was Rabbi Dr. Wolf Gottlieb, Rabbi at Queen's Park Synagogue, Glasgow, and head of Glasgow's rabbinical court (av beit din). Zornberg is a descendant of prominent rabbis from Eastern Europe. Her parents settled in Austria. Zornberg's family fled Austria after the Nazi takeover which led to the collapse of Jewish life and subsequent genocide of the Holocaust. Zornberg holds a PhD from Cambridge University in English Literature.

She began her Bible teaching career roughly around 1980. She previously taught English literature at the Hebrew University of Jerusalem. Zornberg has grown to world acclaim through her writing and teaching of biblical commentary on the books of the Torah. She has lectured and taught internationally and has appeared on PBS (the American television Public Broadcasting Service) in Genesis: A Living Conversation, a series of programs discussing the Book of Genesis produced and hosted by Bill Moyers. She has published four books regarding her thoughts, theories, and commentaries: The Beginning of Desire: Reflections on Genesis, which won the National Jewish Book Award for Nonfiction in 1995, The Particulars of Rapture: Reflections on Exodus, and The Murmuring Deep: Reflections on the Biblical Unconscious, which discusses selected passages from Genesis and other books of the Bible, including Jonah, Esther, and Ruth. 'Bewilderments: Reflections on the Book of Numbers' 2015. Moses: A Human Life a biography of Moses, was published in November 2016 by the Yale University Press in their Jewish Lives series. Her newest book, The Hidden Order of Intimacy: Reflections on the Book of Leviticus was published in March 2022 by Schocken Books.

== Bibliography ==
- The Beginning of Desire: Reflections on Genesis (1995)
- The Particulars of Rapture: Reflections on Exodus (2001)
- The Murmuring Deep: Reflections on the Biblical Unconscious (2011)
- Bewilderments: Reflections on the Book of Numbers (2015)
- Moses: A Human Life (2016)
- The Hidden Order of Intimacy: Reflections on the Book of Leviticus (2022)

== External sites ==
- Official Website
