= 2013 in Israel =

- Decades: 1990s; 2000s; 2010s; 2020s
- See also: History of Israel; Timeline of Israeli history; List of years in Israel

Events in the year 2013 in Israel.

== Incumbents ==
- President of Israel – Shimon Peres
- Prime Minister of Israel – Benjamin Netanyahu (Likud)
- President of the Supreme Court – Asher Grunis
- Chief of General Staff – Benny Gantz
- Government of Israel – 32nd Government of Israel until March 18, 33rd Government of Israel

== Events ==
=== January ===
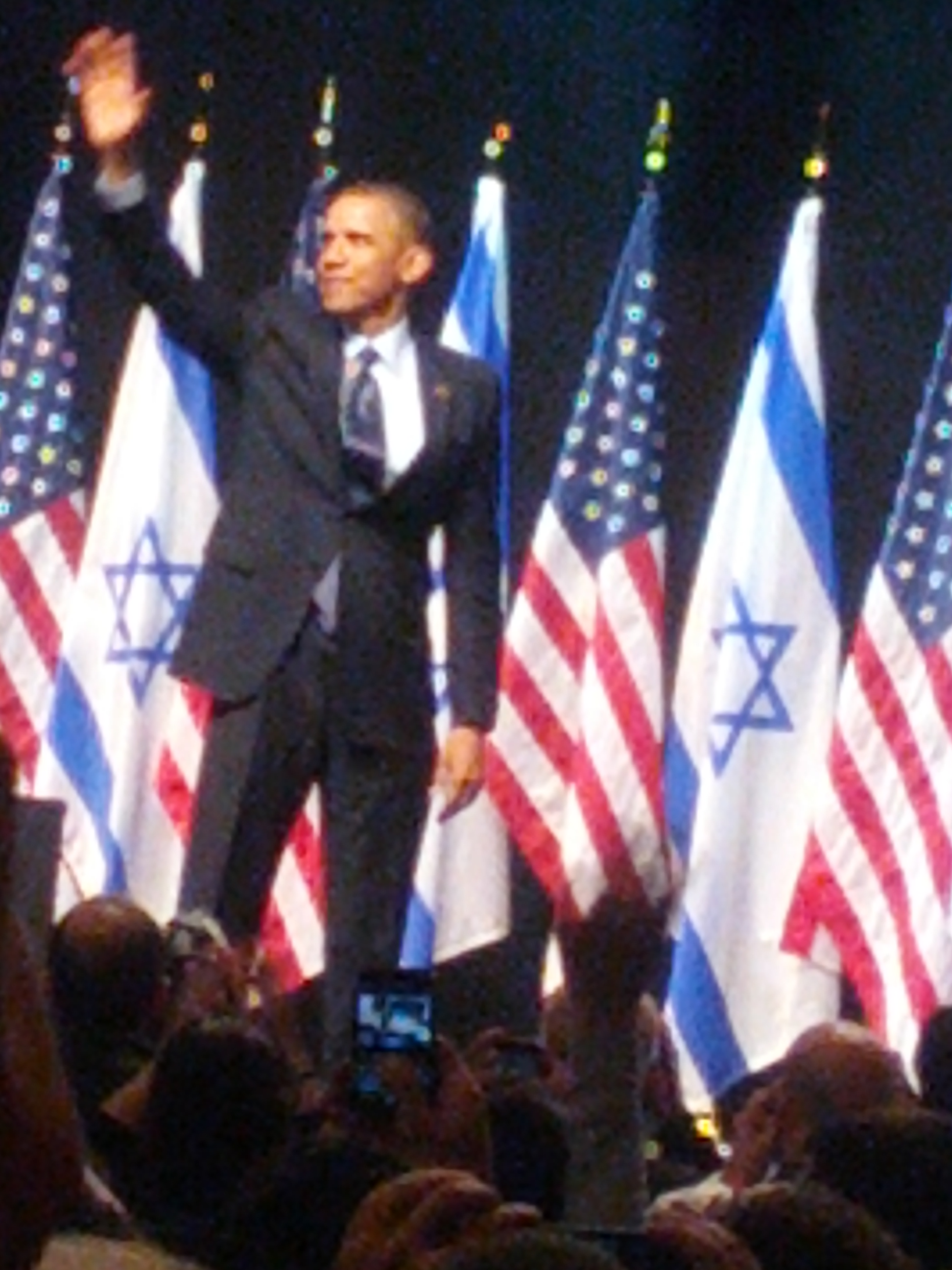
March 20, 2013 – President of the United States Barack Obama begins a four-day visit to Israel and the Palestinian territories

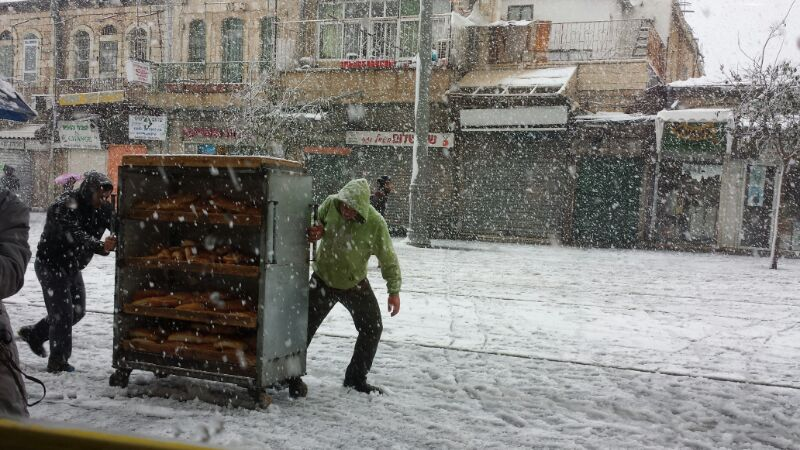
Snow in Jerusalem during Storm Alexa

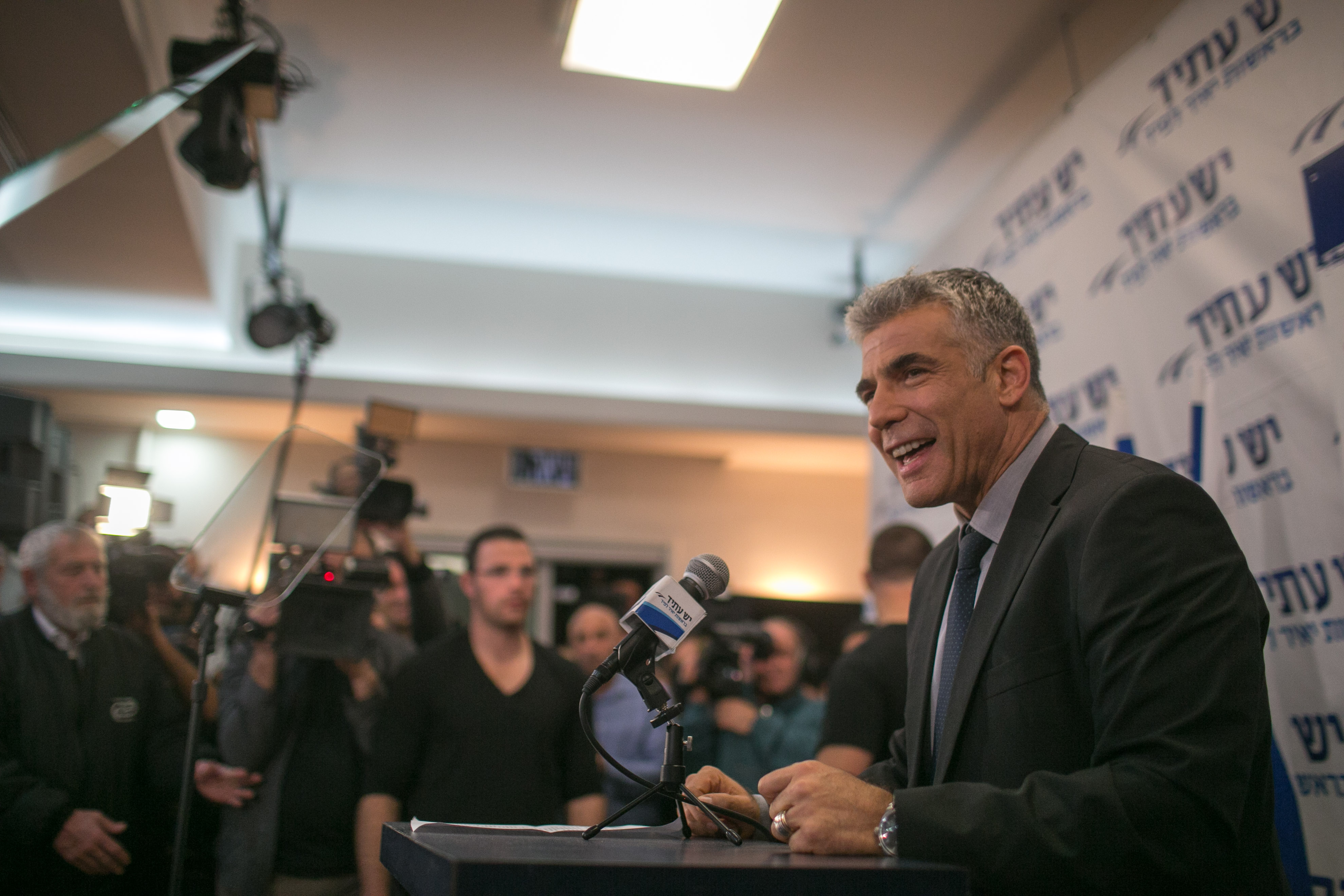
Yair Lapid, leader of the Yesh Atid party, celebrating the unprecedented success of his party in the elections, January 24, 2013.

- January 2 – Construction of the barrier on the Israeli–Egyptian border is completed in its main section.
- January 4 – Hundreds of thousands of people rally in Gaza in a show of unity between the governing Hamas, elected in 2006, and Fatah, in opposition since then.
- January 18 – Benjamin Netanyahu says in an interview that he will not destroy any more Israeli settlements during his second term.
- January 22 – The Elections for the 19th Knesset are held in Israel. The incumbent PM Benjamin Netanyahu's electoral alliance, Likud Yisrael Beiteinu, won a plurality of the seats in the legislative election, with 31 seats.
- January 30 – Israel allegedly launches an airstrike on a Syrian convoy transporting weapons to Hezbollah. Other sources stated the targeted site was a military research center in Jamraya responsible for developing biological and chemical weapons.
- January 31 – United Nations report says that Israeli settlements must be immediately withdrawn without preconditions, to comply with article 49 of the Fourth Geneva Convention.

=== March ===
- March 5 – Swarms of locusts from Egypt enter Israel. A large, 3.5-month long, extermination scheme was employed by The Ministry of Agriculture, avoiding crop loss.
- March 18 – Benjamin Netanyahu presents his cabinet for a Knesset "Vote of Confidence". The 33rd government is approved that day and the members are sworn in.
- March 20 – President of the United States Barack Obama begins a four-day visit to Israel, the Palestinian territories and Jordan.
- March 30 – Israel started to extract gas from the Tamar offshore field.

=== April ===
- April 17 – Two rockets fired from Egypt's Sinai Peninsula hit the Israeli resort of Eilat, but land in open areas, causing no damage. Three more rockets hit open areas in neighboring Jordan.
- April 25 – Israeli Air Force shoots down a drone off the coast of Haifa, allegedly belonging to Hezbollah.

=== May ===
- May 3 – Two additional Israeli air strikes against Syria reportedly take place May 3 and 5. Both targeted long-ranged weapons sent from Iran to Hezbollah.
- 16 May – Moran Mazor represents Israel at the Eurovision Song Contest with the song “Rak Bishvilo”, ("Only for Him").
- May 20 – 2013 Beersheba shootings; During a vendetta attack carried out in a Bank Hapoalim branch in Beersheba, an Israeli citizen enters a bank and opens fire with a pistol, killing four people and injuring five, then commits suicide.
- May 21 – During mine-clearance work in the Golan Heights, an IDF soldier is killed after stepping on a land mine.

=== June ===
- June 18 – President Shimon Peres' 90th birthday celebrations at ICC in Jerusalem. Representatives from Israel and abroad attended the celebrations, including former U.S. President Bill Clinton, Israeli Prime Minister Benjamin Netanyahu, singer Barbra Streisand, former British Prime Minister Tony Blair and many more.

=== July ===
- July 5 – According to anonymous U.S. officials, Israel launches an airstrike on Syria. It targeted Russian-made Yakhont anti-ship missiles near the city of Latakia, and killed several Syrian troops.
- July 10–20 – Israel women's national lacrosse team competed in the 2013 Women's Lacrosse World Cup, their first time competing in the competition, finishing 8th
- 18–30 July – The 19th Maccabiah Games are held with 7,500 athletes from Israel and Jewish communities throughout the world competing in 34 sports.
- July 28 – As a "good will gesture" to restart peace talks with the Palestinian Authority, Israel agrees to release 104 Palestinian prisoners, most of whom have been in jail since before the 1993 Oslo Accords.

=== August ===
- August 10–18 – Israel sent 3 athletes to the 2013 World Championships in Athletics
- August 26 – The Metronit BRT system in Haifa begins operating.

=== October ===
- October 22 – Israel's municipal elections.
- October 30 – Israel allegedly carries out an airstrike against a Syrian air defense site in Snawbar, 10 miles south of Latakia.

=== November ===
- November 6 – Former Foreign Minister Avigdor Lieberman's trial for fraud and breach of trust ends with an acquittal.
- November 11 – Avigdor Lieberman resumes his position as Foreign Minister. Prime Minister Netanyahu had previously been acting Foreign Minister, and had held the position in reserve for Lieberman should he be acquitted.

=== December ===
- December 10 – The Knesset passes the "Law to Advance Competition and Limit Monopolization", aimed at breaking up the large conglomerates controlling a large part of the Israeli economy and increasing economic competition, so as to significantly lower the cost of living. The law, which came as the result of the 2011 social justice protests, forces Israel's large monopolies to sell a large percentage of their assets by banning business pyramids.
- December 12 – Storm Alexa begins. Israel, along with the occupied territories and other areas of the Middle East, sees days of heavy snowfall and rain. The storm causes widespread traffic disruptions and power outages, and forcing the temporary closure of several highways, schools, and Ben-Gurion International Airport. Jerusalem is completely paralyzed by deep snow and flooding, with residents told to stay indoors and roads leading to the city blocked.
- December 15 – Life begins returning to normal after Storm Alexa subsides.
- December 16 – Israeli naval officer Shlomi Cohen, who was driving along the Israel–Lebanon border, is killed when a Lebanese soldier, acting without any orders, opens fire at his vehicle, and then flees his post. A few hours later, IDF soldiers operating in the area shoot two Lebanese soldiers after seeing what was termed "suspicious movement" across the border. The soldier who killed Cohen later turns himself in to Lebanese authorities, who promise that he will be prosecuted.
- December 22 – a pressure cooker bomb explodes on a public bus in the Tel Aviv suburb of Bat Yam, Israel. All casualties were averted because a few minutes earlier, a passenger on the bus had examined the contents of an unattended bag, and saw what looked like a bomb inside, which led all passengers and the driver to exit the vehicle.

== Notable deaths ==
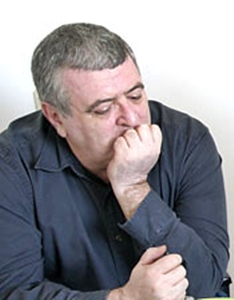
Amnon Dankner

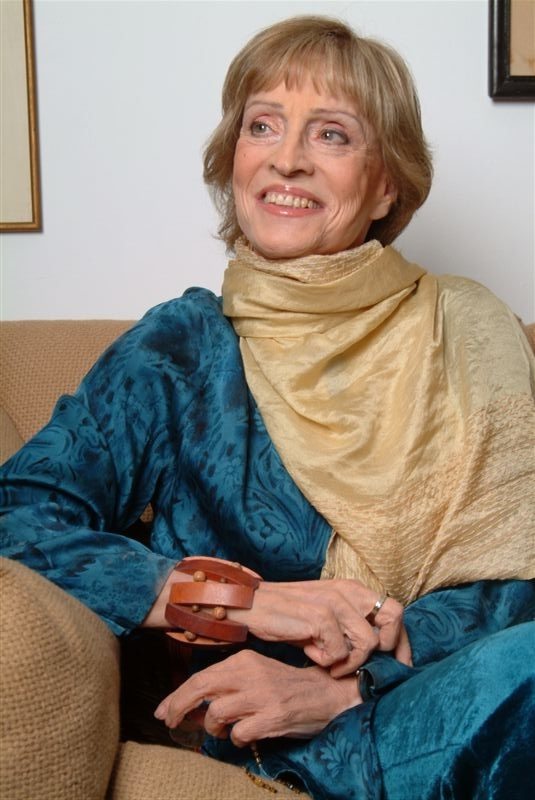
Dvora Omer

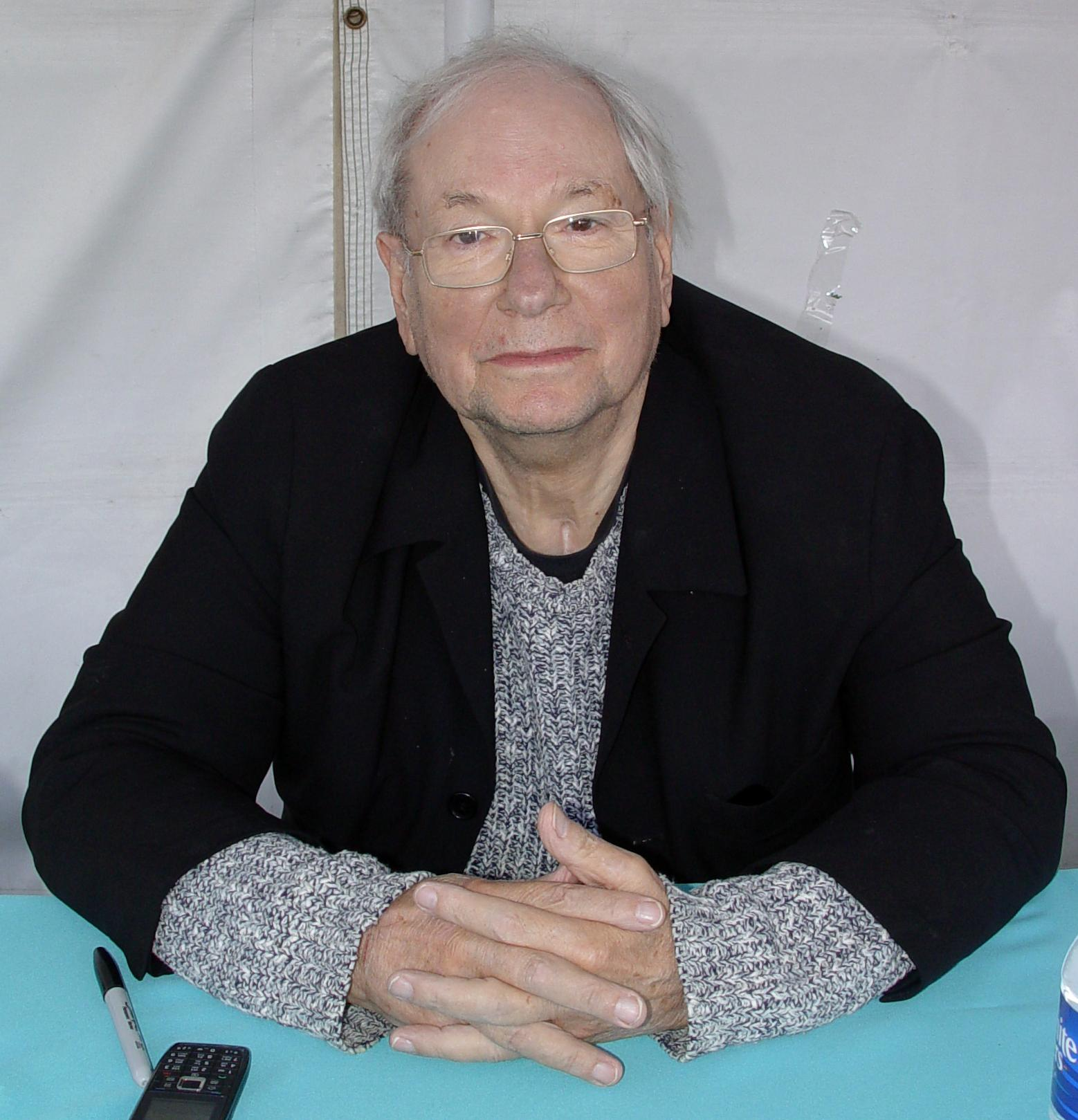
Yoram Kaniuk

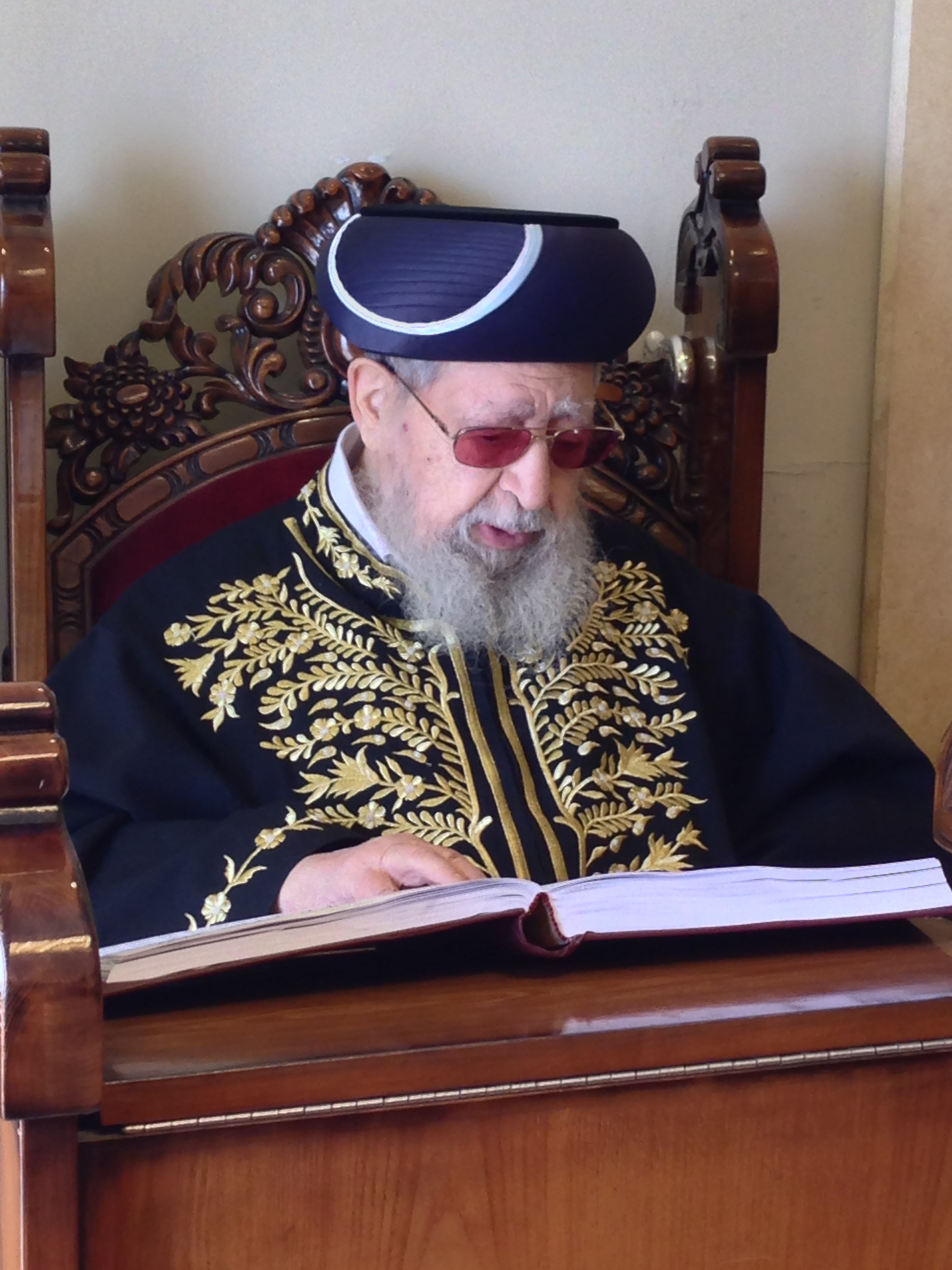
Ovadia Yosef

- January 1 – Yaakov Friedman (born 1928), Sadigura Hasidic dynasty Rebbe and member of the Agudat Yisrael's Council of Torah Sages
- January 2 – Zaharira Harifai (born 1929), Israeli actress
- January 8 – Zvi Yavetz (born 1925), Israeli historian and Israel Prize laureate
- January 14 – Yehudith Birk (born 1926), Israeli biochemist (Bowman–Birk protease inhibitor)
- January 18 – Ron Nachman (born 1942), Israeli politician and mayor of Ariel
- January 21 – Zina Harman (born 1914), Israeli politician
- February 6 – Menachem Elon (born 1923), Israeli jurist and author on Jewish law
- February 10 – David Hartman (born 1931), Jewish author and philosopher
- February 10 – Sara Braverman (born 1918), member of the Jewish Parachutists of Mandate Palestine, was one of the first female fighters whom served in the Palmach, and the founding member of the IDF Women's Corps
- February 17 – Shmulik Kraus (born 1935), Israeli actor and musician
- March 4 – Rabbi Menachem Froman (born 1945), Orthodox Jewish rabbi, peace activist and poet
- March 16 – Marina Solodkin (born 1952), Russian-born Israeli politician, Member of Knesset (1996–2013), stroke
- April 2 – Vardimos Zeiler (born 1933), Israeli judge and head of various national public committees
- April 5 – Amnon Dankner (born 1946), Israeli publicist and author
- April 9 – Mordechai Mishani (born 1945), Israeli politician
- April 11 – Ram Karmi (born 1931), Israeli architect
- April 12 – Ya'akov Yosef (born 1946), Israeli rabbi and politician
- April 14 – Efi Arazi (born 1937), Israeli businessman, entrepreneur and philanthropist
- April 15 – Benjamin Fain (born 1930), Israeli physicist and refusenik
- April 29 – Pesah Grupper (born 1924), Israeli politician and former Minister of Agriculture
- May 2 – Dvora Omer (born 1932), Israeli author
- May 5 – Menachem Yedid (born 1918), Israeli politician
- May 21 – Pnina Mor (born 1951), Israeli model
- May 23 – Michael Lev (born 1917), Israeli writer
- May 25 – Hanan Azran (born 1951), Israeli journalist and television host
- June 8 – Yoram Kaniuk (born 1930), Israeli author
- June 10 – Yitzhak Shimoni (born 1926), Israeli editor, radio broadcaster and TV host
- June 11 – Rabbi Yehoshua Neuwirth (born 1927), author of a two-volume Hebrew language treatise "Shemirat Shabbat Kehilchatah"
- June 19 – Lt. General Aryeh Ivtsan (born 1928), the 8th Israeli chief of police
- June 21 – Uzi Meshulam (born 1952), Rabbi of Yemeni origin who became known for leading an armed standoff in 1994 as part of his struggle to expose the Yemenite Children Affair.
- August 2 – Alla Kushnir, 71, Russian–born Israeli chess Woman Grandmaster
- August 4 – Yitzhak Berman, 100, Ukrainian-born Israeli politician, member of the Knesset (1977–1984), Speaker (1980–1981), Minister of Energy and Water Resources (1981–1982)
- August 6 – Ze'ev Ben-Haim, 105, Israeli linguist
- August 17 – Yehudit Arnon, 87, Israeli dancer, choreographer and dance company founder, winner of Israel Prize (1998)
- August 20 – Gabriel Balachsan, 37, Israeli rock musician and songwriter
- October 7 – Ovadia Yosef, 93, former Sephardi Chief Rabbi of Israel and foremost authority on Jewish law
- November 26 – Arik Einstein, 74, Israeli singer-songwriter, his songs were described as the "soundtrack of Israel"
- December 3 – Sefi Rivlin, 66, Israel Stand up and actor

== See also ==
- List of Israeli films of 2013
- Illegal immigration from Africa to Israel
- 2013 in the State of Palestine
- Timeline of the Israeli–Palestinian conflict in 2013
