= 2012 in Israel =

- Decades: 1990s; 2000s; 2010s; 2020s
- See also: History of Israel; Timeline of Israeli history; List of years in Israel

Events in the year 2012 in Israel.

== Incumbents ==
- President of Israel – Shimon Peres
- Prime Minister of Israel – Benjamin Netanyahu (Likud)
- President of the Supreme Court – Dorit Beinisch until 28 February, Asher Grunis
- Chief of General Staff – Benny Gantz
- Government of Israel – 32nd Government of Israel

== Events ==
- January 5 – The former Israeli prime minister Ehud Olmert is charged with taking bribes in a property scandal.
- January 31 – 2012 Likud leadership election: the incumbent Likud chairman Benjamin Netanyahu defeats Moshe Feiglin in the election for the leadership of the Likud party.
- February 5 – An explosion hits the gas pipeline between Egypt, Israel and Jordan in the North Sinai Governorate west of Arish.
- February 13 – Attacks on Israeli diplomats: An explosive device is detonated in an Israeli diplomat's car in the vicinity of the Israeli Embassy in New Delhi. Two people were wounded in the New Delhi attack. In addition, explosives are discovered near the Israeli Embassy building in the Georgian capital of Tbilisi and the device is neutralized safely. Israel has accused Iran of being behind the attacks.
- February 28 – Supreme Court President Dorit Beinisch retired from office and was replaced by justice Asher Grunis.
- March 27 – 2012 Kadima leadership election: Shaul Mofaz defeats Tzipi Livni in the election for the leadership of the Kadima party. Mofaz won the election 62.3% to 37.7% with a turnout of approximately 40%.
- May 8 – Only a few hours before the Knesset was expected to approve its own dissolution and set September 4, 2012 as the date for the next elections, Prime Minister Benjamin Netanyahu reached an agreement with the Head of Opposition Shaul Mofaz for Kadima to join the current government, thus canceling the early election supposed to be held in September.
- May 17 – Israel national American football team played their first every game, in Petah Tikva against Maranatha Baptist University, losing 49-6.
- 22 May – The group Izabo represents Israel at the Eurovision Song Contest with the song “Time” reaching the semi-final round.
- June 21–29 – Israel men's national lacrosse team competed in the European Lacrosse Championships for the first time, finishing 8th.
- July 4 – Archaeologists in Israel discover a mosaic floor depicting the biblical figure of Samson and a Hebrew inscription in an ancient synagogue in the Galilee region.
- July 10 – A Jerusalem court convicts former Prime Minister Ehud Olmert on one count of breach of trust and acquits him on two counts of fraud.
- July 17 – The Kadima party leaves Netanyahu's government due to a dispute concerning military conscription for ultra-Orthodox Jews in Israel.
- July 18 – 2012 Burgas bus bombing: 7 people are killed and more than 30 others are injured after a suicide bomber exploded on an Israeli tourism bus, containing 42 Israeli tourists, parked in the parking lot of the Burgas Airport in Bulgaria.
- August 1 – The Tal Law, which granted a sweeping exemption from military service to majority of the Israeli ultra-Orthodox population in Israel, expires. As a result, Defense Minister Ehud Barak orders the Israel Defense Forces to prepare for universal conscription of Haredi men in 30 days.
- August 5 – August 2012 Egypt-Israel border attack: Heavily armed gunmen assault an Egyptian checkpoint on the Egypt-Israeli border, killing 16 police officers. They commandeer two armored vehicles, one of which is then destroyed by the Israeli Air Force.
- September 19–23 – Israel national baseball team competed in the World Baseball Classic qualifier for the first time
- September 21 – September 2012 Egypt-Israel border attack: Three Egyptian heavily armed militants, dressed as civilians, wearing explosive belts, and carrying rifles and rocket-propelled grenades, approached the Egypt-Israel border at an area where the separation barrier remained incomplete, and opened fire on a group of soldiers from the Israeli Artillery Corps. In the ensuing gunfight, the three militants and one Israeli soldier were killed.
- October 6 – Israeli Air Force shot down a small UAV as it flew over northern Negev. Hezbollah confirmed it sent drone.
- October 16 – In anticipation of upcoming elections, the Israeli Knesset has been unanimously dissolved.
- October 21 – United States and Israel began their biggest joint air and missile defense exercise, known as Austere Challenge 12, involving around 3,500 U.S. troops in the region along with 1,000 IDF personnel. Germany and Britain also participated.
- October 23 – In what was widely believed to be a long-range attack by the Israeli Air Force, an arms factory in Khartoum, Sudan, that was alleged to have participated in arms-smuggling to Hamas, exploded. The Israeli government refused to either confirm or deny its involvement.
- October 25 – Prime Minister and Likud chairman Benjamin Netanyahu and the Foreign Minister and Yisrael Beiteinu chairman Avigdor Lieberman announced the unification of their two parties, which would run as a single bloc for the upcoming elections. The joint party would be called "Likud Beiteinu" ("The Likud Is Our Home") and Netanyahu will be number 1 on the list, followed by Liberman who will be number 2 on the list.
- November 11 – a 120 mm mortar shell exploded near an Israeli post in the Golan Heights. As a result, the Israel Defense Forces fired an anti-tank missile at the source of the bombardment in Syria.
- November 12 – A second mortar shell from Syria has been fired at an Israeli military outpost in the Golan Heights. The Israel Defense Forces have responded with tank fire at the source of the bombardment in Syria, scoring several direct hits on artillery units belonging to the Syrian Army.
- November 26 – Ehud Barak announces that he will retire from politics after the next election in January 2013.
- December 14 – Avigdor Lieberman resigns as Foreign Affairs Minister and as Deputy Prime Minister following an indictment for fraud. Prime Minister Benjamin Netanyahu takes over the post of Foreign Minister, and announces that the Foreign Ministry will be held in reserve for Lieberman pending the outcome of his trial, with Lieberman allowed to resume his position as Foreign Minister if acquitted.

=== Israeli–Palestinian conflict ===
The UN General Assembly approves a motion granting Palestine non-member observer state status. UN observer state status voting results were: In favour Against Abstentions Absent Non-members

The most prominent events related to the Israeli–Palestinian conflict that occurred during 2012 include:

- January 3 – Negotiators from Israel and the Palestinian Authority meet in the Jordanian capital, Amman, for the first time in 16 months.
- January 25 – IDF forces capture the Speaker of the Hamas-dominated Palestinian Parliament Aziz Duwaik near Ramallah, on charges of membership in an illegal organization. Following his capture, a military court in the Ofer Prison sentences him to six months in prison.
- March 9–16 – March 2012 Gaza-Israel clashes
  - March 9 – March 2012 Gaza-Israel clashes: Secretary-general of the Popular Resistance Committees Zuhir al-Qaisi, a senior PRC member and two additional Palestinian militants were assassinated during a targeted killing carried out by Israeli forces in Gaza. The Palestinian armed factions in the Gaza Strip, led by the Islamic Jihad and the Popular Resistance Committees, fired a massive number of rockets towards southern Israel in retaliation for three consecutive days. This would become the most serious escalation in the Gaza Strip since Operation Cast Lead.
- March 15 – A teenage Palestinian commits a stabbing attack on the Jerusalem Light Rail within Pisgat Ze’ev in Jerusalem, seriously wounding a 19-year-old female soldier before fleeing. The attacker was captured several hours later at the Kalandia crossing north of Jerusalem while trying to flee back to Palestinian Authority-controlled territories.
- April 5 – A rocket fired from Egypt's Sinai desert hits the Israeli city of Eilat causing no injuries or property damage.
- April – Second flytilla
- June 1 – An Israeli soldier was killed in an exchange of fire with a Palestinian militant who was trying to infiltrate into Israel near the southern Gaza Strip.
- June 6 – Hours after a bill to legalize settlement outposts is rejected, Israeli prime minister Benjamin Netanyahu orders the construction of 300 new homes at the Jewish settlement of Beit El in the West Bank.
- June 7 – An additional 550 settler homes are announced by Israeli construction minister Ariel Attias in addition to the 300 new settler homes ordered yesterday by the land's prime minister Benjamin Netanyahu at the Jewish settlement of Beit El in the West Bank.
- June – Israeli transfer of Palestinian militant bodies: Israel hands over the bodies of 91 Palestinian suicide bombers and other militants as part of a goodwill gesture to PA chairman Mahmoud Abbas to help revive the peace talks and reinstate direct negotiations between Israel and the Palestinians.
- June 18 – A militant squad kill an Israeli construction worker and wound two of his colleagues in an attack carried out on the border between Israel and Egypt.
- November 14 – Operation Pillar of Defense: Hamas military chief Ahmed Jabari is killed in a targeted air strike carried out by the Israel Defense Forces and the Shin Bet.
- November 15 – Operation Pillar of Defense: Three Israeli civilians are killed in Kiryat Malachi, Israel, in a further barrage of rocket attacks on southern Israel from Palestinians in the Gaza Strip. Rockets have hit apartment buildings, schools and private houses so far.
- November 15 – Operation Pillar of Defense: Two rockets are fired from the Gaza Strip at Tel Aviv, with one landing in the sea and the other hitting an uninhabited area in the city's suburbs. Iranian backed Islamic Jihad has claimed responsibility for the incident, which was the first attack against the city since the 1991 Gulf War.
- November 16 – Operation Pillar of Defense: Palestinian militants fired a rocket aimed at Jerusalem setting off air raid sirens in the city.
- November 21 – Operation Pillar of Defense: A ceasefire between Israel and Hamas, announced by Egyptian Foreign Minister Mohamed Kamel Amr and US Secretary of State Hillary Clinton, comes into effect at 7:00 pm local time.
- November 29 – The 67th session of the United Nations General Assembly approves to upgrade Palestine's status from an "observer" to an "observer state", with 138 voting in favor, 9 against and 41 abstaining.
- December 8 – Hamas leader Khaled Mashal arrived in Gaza for the first time ever to celebrate the organization's anniversary. In his speech, which Mashal gave at a mass rally attended by hundreds of thousands of supporters, he stated explicitly that the Palestinian people would never compromise with Israel's existence and that the organization will act decisively to gradually conquer and achieve full control over the territories which encompass both Israel and the Palestinian territories in order to establish one Islamic state in that area.

== Predicted and scheduled events ==
- The Metronit in Haifa is set to be completed.

== Notable deaths ==
Benzion Netanyahu

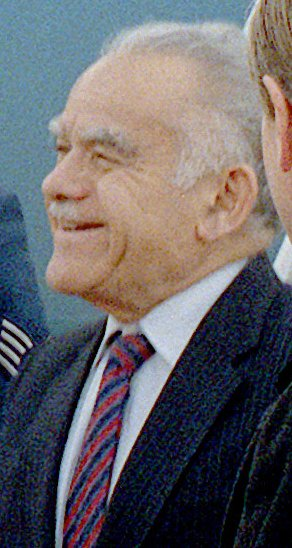
Yitzhak Shamir

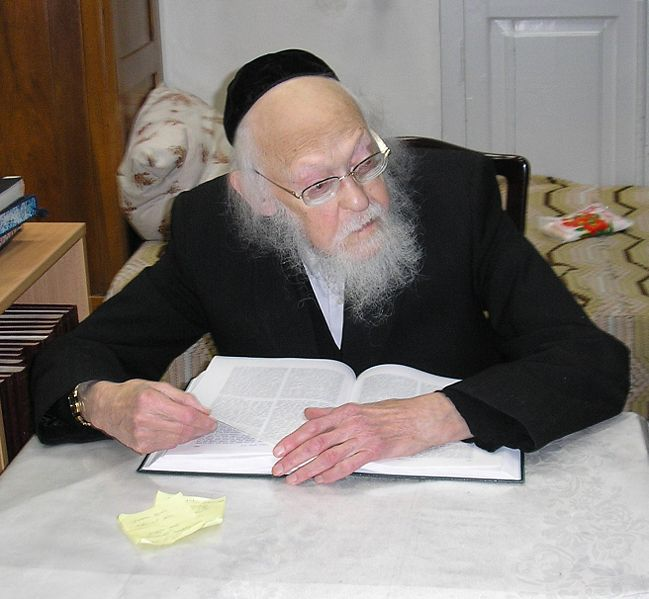
Yosef Shalom Eliashiv

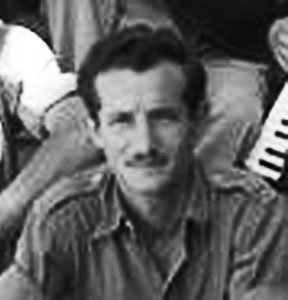
Haim Hefer

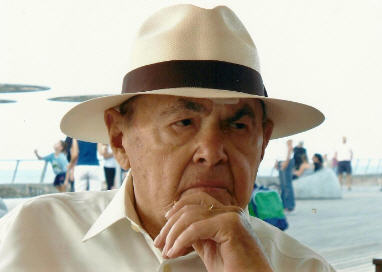
David Resnick

- January 1 – Yafa Yarkoni (born 1925), Israeli singer
- January 6 – Gabriel Cadis (born 1951), Israeli attorney, chairman of the Jaffa Orthodox Church Association
- January 10 – Israel Getzler (born 1920), Israeli historian
- January 19 – Shraga Gafni (born 1926), Israeli children's book author
- January 23 – Yardena Cohen (born 1910), Israeli dancer and choreographer
- February 1 – Yona Baltman (born 1929), Israeli jurist, State Attorney (1982–1988)
- February 11 – Aharon Davidi (born 1927), Israeli general and founder of the Sar-El volunteer program of the IDF
- March 4 – Shmuel Tankus (born 1914), Israeli general, fifth commander of the Navy
- March 5 – Yehuda Ben-Haim (born 1966), Israeli Olympic boxer
- March 6 – Jacky Mekaiten (born 1955), Israeli singer, lyricist and composer
- March 13 – Moshe Yehoshua Hager (born 1916), Israeli rabbi, 5th Rebbe of Vizhnitz, Bnei Brak
- March 17 – Rina Litvin (born 1939), Israeli author and translator
- March 18 – Haim Alexander (born 1915), German-born Israeli composer
- March 20 – Chaim Pinchas Scheinberg (born 1910), Polish-born Israeli Haredi rabbi and rosh yeshiva.
- March 25 – Ben-Zion Leitner (born 1927), Israeli soldier, Medal of Valor recipient
- April 10 – Zvi Dinstein (born 1926), Israeli politician, MK (1965–1974), pulmonary embolism
- April 13 – Avraham Goldberg (born 1913), American-born Israeli Talmud scholar
- April 30 – Benzion Netanyahu (born 1910), Israeli historian specializing in the history of Jews in Spain; father of Israeli Prime Minister Benjamin Netanyahu.
- May 1 – Mordechai Virshubski (born 1930), Israeli politician, MK (1977–1992) and Deputy Speaker of the Knesset (1988–1992).
- May 7 – Alexander Keynan (born 1921), Israeli microbiologist, co-founder and the first director of Israel Institute for Biological Research.
- May 17 – Gideon Ezra (born 1937), Israeli politician, MK (since 1996)
- June 2 – Avraham Botzer (born 1929), Israeli general, Commander of the Navy (1968–1972).
- June 24 – Yitzhak Galanti (born 1937), Israeli politician, MK (2006–09)
- June 30 – Yitzhak Shamir (born 1915), Prime Minister of Israel (1983–84, 1986–92).
- July 13 – Shlomo Bentin (born 1946), Israeli neuropsychologist and recipient of the 2012 Israel Prize in psychology.
- July 18 – Yosef Shalom Eliashiv (born 1910), Lithuanian-born Israeli rabbi, leader of Orthodox Jewry.
- July 26 – Miriam Ben-Porat (born 1918), Israeli jurist, Supreme Court justice and State Comptroller.
- July 28 – Amos Degani (born 1926), Israeli politician
- August 2 – Amos Hakham (born 1921), Israeli Bible scholar, first winner of the International Bible Contest (1958).
- August 3 – Moshe Piamenta (born 1921), Israeli linguist and orientalist
- September 4 – Abraham Avigdorov (born 1929), Israeli soldier, Medal of Valor recipient
- September 6 – Baruch Bracha (born 1946), Israeli jurist
- September 6 – Dan Lachman (born 1941), Israeli writer and social activist.
- September 18 – Haim Hefer (born 1925), Israeli songwriter, poet and writer
- September 19 – Itamar Singer (born 1946), Romanian-born Israeli Hittitologist
- September 21 – Yehuda Elkana (born 1934), Israeli historian and philosopher, President and Rector of the Central European University (1999–2009).
- September 22 – Gideon Gadot (born 1941), Israeli journalist and politician, member of the Knesset (1984–1992).
- September 28 – Avraham Adan (born 1926), Israeli general
- October 1 – Moshe Sanbar (born 1926), Hungarian-born Israeli economist, Governor of the Bank of Israel (1971–1976).
- October 6 – Shlomo Nitzani (born 1936), Israeli soldier, Medal of Valor and Medal of Distinguished Service recipient.
- November 4 – David Resnick (born 1924), Brazilian-born Israeli architect and town planner.
- November 16 – Eliyahu Nawi (born 1920), Israeli politician and jurist, Mayor of Beersheba (1963–1986).
- November 17 – Lea Gottlieb (born 1918), Israeli fashion designer.
- December 9 – Anat Gov (born 1953), Israeli playwright and scriptwriter.
- December 11 – Mendel Weinbach (born 1933), rosh yeshiva, Yeshivas Ohr Somayach, Jerusalem.
- December 16 – Avraham Mor (born 1938), Israeli actor
- December 19 – Amnon Lipkin-Shahak (born 1944), Israeli general and Chief of Staff of the IDF
- December 28 – Emmanuel Scheffer (born 1924), Israeli football coach and manager

== Major public holidays ==
- Tu Bishvat – February 8
- Fast of Esther – March 7
- Purim – nightfall, March 7 to nightfall, March 8
- Passover and Chol HaMoed Pesach – sunset, April 6 to nightfall, April 14 (7th day) (an additional day is observed outside Israel)
- Holocaust Remembrance Day – nightfall, April 19 to nightfall, April 20
- Israel's Independence Day – nightfall, April 26 to nightfall, April 27
- Lag Ba'omer – May 10
- Jerusalem Day – nightfall, May 20 to nightfall, May 21
- Shavuot – sunset, May 26 to nightfall, May 28 (a second day is observed outside Israel)
- Ninth of Av fast – sunset, July 28 to nightfall, July 29
- Rosh Hashanah – sunset, September 16 to nightfall, September 18
- Yom Kippur – sunset, September 25 to nightfall, September 26
- Sukkot and Chol HaMoed Sukkot – sunset, September 30 to sunset, October 7
- Simchat Torah/Shemini Atzeret – sunset, October 7 to nightfall, October 8 (a second day is observed outside Israel)
- Hanukkah – Sunset, December 8 to nightfall, December 16

== See also ==
- Israel at the 2012 Summer Olympics
- Illegal immigration from Africa to Israel
- List of Israeli films of 2012
- 2012 in the Palestinian territories
