= 2015 in Israel =

- Decades: 1990s; 2000s; 2010s; 2020s
- See also: History of Israel; Timeline of Israeli history; List of years in Israel

Events in the year 2015 in Israel.

== Incumbents ==
- President – Reuven Rivlin
- Prime Minister – Benjamin Netanyahu (Likud)
- Government of Israel – Thirty-third government of Israel until 14 May, Thirty-fourth government of Israel
- President of the Supreme Court – Asher Grunis until 17 January, Miriam Naor
- Chief of General Staff – Benny Gantz until 16 February, Gadi Eizenkot

== Events ==
=== January ===
- January 5 – The Tower of David Kishle prison museum, possibly the site of where Jesus is believed to have been tried before the Sanhedrin before his crucifixion opens to the public in the Old City of Jerusalem.
- January 18 – It was reported that Israeli helicopters attacked a Hezbollah's convoy in the Syrian-controlled part of Golan Heights, killing six prominent members of Hezbollah and six IRGC commanders, including a General.
- January 21 – A Palestinian man from the West Bank, Hamza Muhammad Hassan Matrouk, illegally crosses into Israel for the express purpose to stab people, attacking over a dozen Israelis on a bus in central Tel Aviv. Security forces captured the assailant as he continued to indiscriminately stab people in the street.
- January 28 – Hezbollah fired an anti-tank missile at an Israeli military convoy in the Israeli-occupied territory of Shebaa farms near the Lebanon border, killing two soldiers and wounding seven. In response, Israel fired at least 50 artillery shells across the border into southern Lebanon, in which a Spanish UN peacekeeper was killed.

=== February ===
- February 15 – Opening of the Netivot Railway Station

=== March ===
- March 17 – Early elections for the twentieth Knesset are held. The Likud party, led by incumbent Prime Minister Benjamin Netanyahu, wins the most seats in the Knesset, winning 30 out of 120 seats.
- March 30 – The Jerusalem District Court convicts former Prime Minister of Israel Ehud Olmert of accepting cash from an American businessman for personal use.

=== April ===
- April 16 – A car driven by a Palestinian hit two Israelis at the French Hill junction in Jerusalem in what was described as a terror attack.
- April 25
  - A series of attacks attributed to the Israeli Air Force were made in the Qalamoun region of Syria against Hezbollah camps and weapons convoys in two brigade bases.
  - Four police officers were hit by a car in Jerusalem near the Mount of Olives in a suspected terror attack.

=== May ===
- 23 May – Nadav Guedj represents Israel at the Eurovision Song Contest with the song “ Golden Boy”, achieving 9th place in the finals.

=== June ===
- June 12–28 – Israel sent 141 athletes and won 12 medals at the 2015 European Games
- June 19 – An Israeli civilian was shot dead by a Palestinian gunman after they stopped when the Palestinian waved down their car on a dirt road near the West Bank settlement of Dolev. His companion was injured.
- June 21 – An Israeli Border Police officer was seriously wounded after being stabbed by a Palestinian terrorist outside the Old City of Jerusalem.

=== July ===
- July 3–14– Israel sent 27 athletes to the 2015 Summer Universiade
- July 15 - The 123rd Squadron was relocated to the Palmachim Airbase.
- July 24-August 9 – Israel sent 16 athletes to the 2015 World Aquatics Championships
- July 27–31 – Israel national baseball team competed in the B-level qualifier for the 2016 European Baseball Championship finishing 3rd
- July 29 – First ever game of the Israel Premier Lacrosse League
- July 29 – An Israeli airstrike destroys a vehicle located in a Druse village in southwestern Syria, killing Hezbollah fighters and a pro-Assad militant. A second airstrike targeted a military base along the Syrian-Lebanese border belonging to a pro-Assad Palestinian faction.
- July 30 – Yishai Schlissel stabbed 16-year-old Shira Banki to death, and wounded six other people at the Jerusalem gay pride parade

=== August ===
- August 6–15 – Israel women's national lacrosse team competed at the 2015 Women's Lacrosse European Championship, their first time competing in the tournament, and finished 4th
- August 20–21 – After four rockets hit the Golan Heights and Upper Galilee, Israel allegedly strikes Syrian territory, killing several militants.
- August 22–30 – Israel sent 4 athletes to the 2015 World Championships in Athletics
- August 30 – Israel national American football team won their first ever game, qualifying them for the European Championship of American football

=== September ===
- September 21 – Opening of Turner Stadium

=== October ===
- October 18 – Beersheva bus station shooting
- October 20–22 – the 37th World Zionist Congress is held in Jerusalem
- October 31 – Israeli aircraft attacked numerous Hezbollah targets in southern Syria, close to the border with Lebanon in the Qalamoun Mountains region. Estimated targets included a weapons convoy destined for Hezbollah.

=== November ===
- November 11 – Israeli airstrike near Damascus airport that targeted Hezbollah weapons warehouses.
- November 19 – Tel Aviv synagogue stabbing
- November 23 – Israeli airstrike in the Qualamoun region killed 13 Syrian troops and Hezbollah fighters.
- November 28 – Israeli airstrike around Qalamoun, causing dead and wounded among Hezbollah fighters.

=== December ===
- December 20 – Explosion in Jaramana attributed to the Israeli Air Force that killed Hezbollah commander and convicted murderer Samir Kuntar.
- December 26 – Alleged Israeli airstrike against seven Hezbollah positions in the Qalamoun Mountains area.
- December 31 – Opening of the Ofakim Railway Station

== Deaths ==
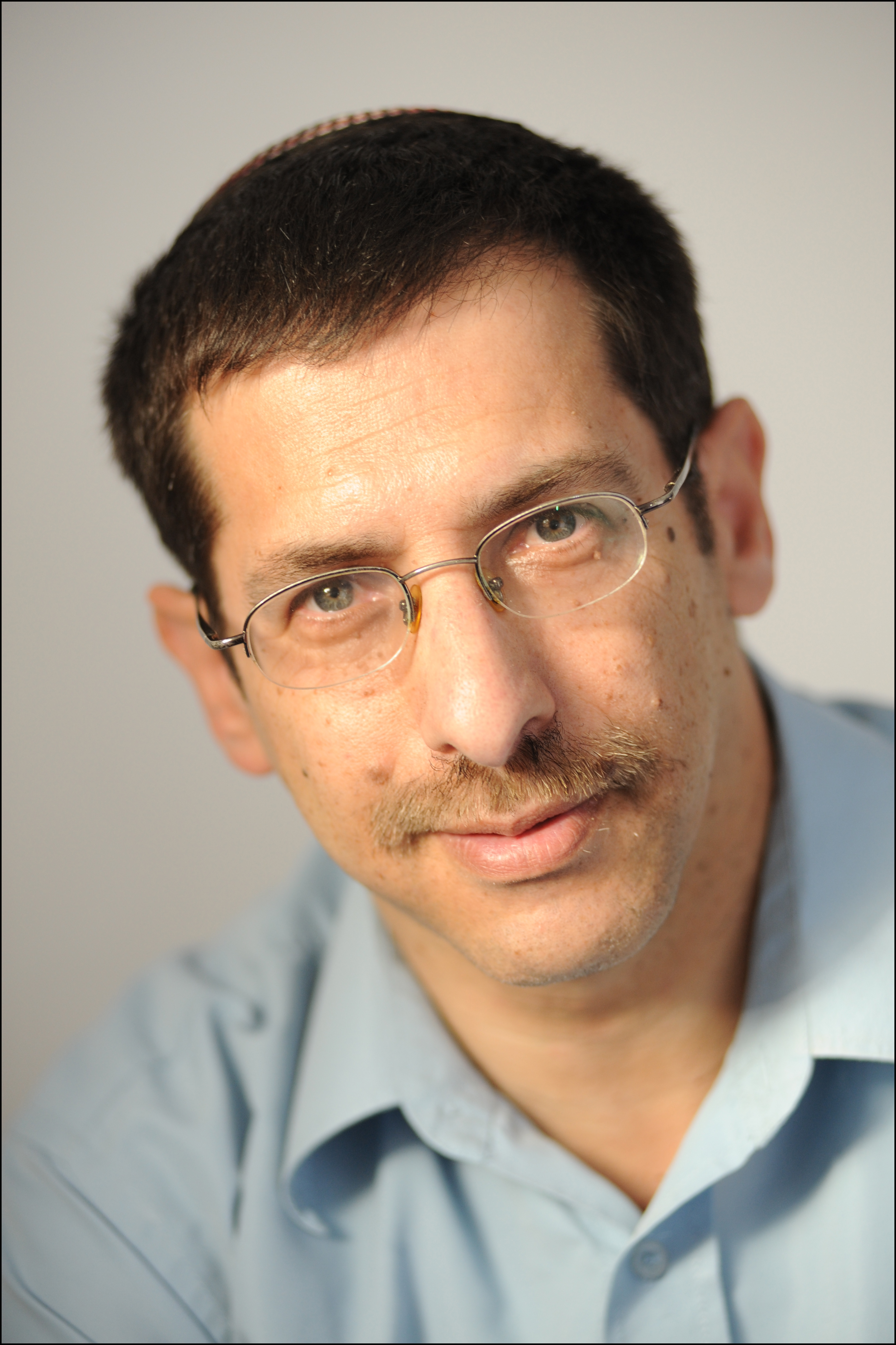
Uri Orbach

- January 13 – Hillel Zaks, Polish-born Israeli rabbi (born 1931)
- January 14 – Mordechai Shmuel Ashkenazi, rabbi (born 1943)
- January 16 – Miriam Akavia, Polish-born Israeli writer and translator (born 1927)
- January 27 – David Landau, editor-in-chief of Haaretz (born 1947)
- January 29 – Israel Yinon, conductor (born 1956)
- February 6 – Eliezer Shlomo Schick, rabbi (born 1940)
- February 9 – Roman Frister, newspaper editor and Holocaust survivor (born 1928)
- February 16 – Uri Orbach, politician and government minister (born 1960)
- February 23 – Haim Corfu, politician and government minister (born 1921)
- February 27 – Nadia Hilou, politician (born 1953)
- March 11 – Janice Rebibo, American-born Israeli poet (born 1950)
- March 13 – Lia van Leer, Romanian-born Israeli film programming pioneer (born 1924)
- March 24 – Yehuda Avner, prime ministerial advisor, diplomat, and author (born 1928)
- April 3 – Shmuel Wosner, rabbi (born 1913)
- April 14 – Meir Rosenne, lawyer and diplomat (born 1931)
- April 12 – Aharon Lichtenstein, rabbi (born 1933)
- May 7 – Arieh Elias, actor (born 1921)
- May 8 – Menashe Kadishman, sculptor and painter (born 1932)
- May 16 – Moshe Levinger, rabbi (born 1935)
- May 19 – Robert S. Wistrich, historian (born 1945)
- June 3 – Avi Beker, writer, statesman, and academic (born 1951)
- June 5 – Eshel Ben-Jacob, physicist (born 1952)
- June 8 – David Rotem, politician (born 1949)
- June 12 – Shoshana Arbeli-Almozlino, politician and government minister (born 1926)
- June 27 – Zvi Elpeleg, Polish-born Israeli academic and diplomat (born 1926)
- July 1 – Shlomo Moussaieff, diamond merchant and antique collector (born 1925)
- July 8 – Yoash Tzidon, politician (born 1926)
- August 6 – Orna Porat, German-born Israeli actress (born 1924)
- August 13 – Shlomo Smiltiner, chess player (born 1915)
- August 16 – Jacob Bekenstein, Mexican-born Israeli-American theoretical physicist (born 1947)
- September 25 – Moti Kirschenbaum, TV show host (born 1939)
- November 6 – Yitzhak Navon, diplomat and politician, former President of Israel (born 1921)
- December 4 – Yossi Sarid, politician and news commentator (born 1940)
- December 15 – Harry Zvi Tabor, British-born Israeli Physicist (born 1917)

== See also ==
- Timeline of the Israeli–Palestinian conflict in 2015
