= 2017 in Israel =

- Decades: 1990s; 2000s; 2010s; 2020s
- See also: History of Israel; Timeline of Israeli history; List of years in Israel

The following lists events in the year 2017 in Israel.

== Incumbents ==
- President – Reuven Rivlin
- Prime Minister – Benjamin Netanyahu
- Government of Israel – 34th government of Israel
- President of the Supreme Court – Miriam Naor until 26 October, Esther Hayut
- Chief of General Staff – Gadi Eizenkot

== Events ==
=== January ===
- January 7 – Israel announces it will withhold $6 million from its annual United Nations dues in protest of the December 23, 2016, Security Council settlement resolution.
- January 8 –
  - Four Israeli soldiers killed and 21 injured in a truck ramming attack by a Palestinian ISIS sympathizer in East Jerusalem. The perpetrator was arrested and was jailed for 10 years.
  - An investigation is demanded by several British MPs into a recent scandal in which an Israeli embassy official in London had conspired to damage the reputation of several British politicians in response to the recent United Nations Security Council resolution.
- January 9 – Israeli Prime Minister Benjamin Netanyahu blames the Islamic State for the attack that killed four soldiers and injured 15 others in East Jerusalem.
- January 10 – The Palestinian National Authority threatens to revoke its recognition of Israel's signing of the 1993 Oslo I Accord if the United States, under the presidency of Donald Trump, moves its Embassy in Tel Aviv to Jerusalem.
- January 15 – A summit begins in Paris, France, to restart peace negotiations between Israel and the state of Palestine in an effort to discuss a possible two-state solution to the conflict. However, neither Israel nor Palestine sent representatives to the summit, casting doubts on a breakthrough.
- January 17 – Israeli Prime Minister Benjamin Netanyahu calls the latest peace-conference "useless".
- January 18 –
  - Two Israeli Bedouins and one Israeli police officer are killed in a clash during a home-demolition operation in the Bedouin village of Umm al-Hiran. Israeli police claim to have found evidence that the Bedouins were supporters of the Islamic State.
  - The Fatah-dominated Palestinian Authority agrees to form a unity government with Hamas following a three-day delegation in Moscow.
- January 22 – Following the inauguration of Donald Trump as President of the United States, Israel approves the construction of 566 new settlement homes in East Jerusalem.
- January 27 – Israeli authorities approve 153 construction permits for settlement homes in East Jerusalem, and plan to approve another 11,000 in the coming months.

=== February ===
- February 1 –
  - Israel announces it will build an entirely new settlement in the West Bank for the first time in about twenty years. Many in the international community believe that such settlements are illegal but Israel disputes that. The settlement program is illegal under international law.
  - Israeli security forces begin evicting people from the illegal Amona, Mateh Binyamin, outpost built on private Palestinian-owned land near Ramallah in the central West Bank. The Supreme Court ordered residents to leave the area last year.
- February 2 – The White House cautions Israel that building new settlements or expanding existing settlements in the West Bank, "... may not be helpful in achieving (peace)."
- February 6 – The Knesset passed the Regulation Law 60 to 52
- February 8 – Hebrew University of Jerusalem archaeologists announce the discovery of another cave that used to have Dead Sea Scrolls.
- February 21 – Israeli soldier Elor Azaria is sentenced to 18 months in prison by a military court for shooting and killing the unarmed amd wounded Palestinian Abdel Fattah al-Sharif for stabbing an IDF soldier last March in Hebron.
- February 24 – Israel denies entry to Omar Shakir, a researcher for Human Rights Watch and an American citizen, because the organization engages in so-called Palestinian propaganda. HRW's Sari Bashi said, "This Israeli government has been narrowing the space for democratic activity," by closing the country off to critics. Later, the Israel government would grant Mr. Shakir a tourist visa while considering HRW's appeal on the work visa.
- February 27 – At least four Palestinians are injured following Israeli air strikes in Gaza City that were reportedly in response to rockets launched into southern Israel by Hamas.
- February 28 – Hundreds of right-wing activists protest and clash with police over the court-ordered demolition of the Israeli settlement Ofra, which was built on private Palestinian land in the West Bank, with Israeli police evacuating nine residences in the settlement, despite hunger strikes and barricading of the settlers inside.

=== March ===
- March 5 – Israel changes its law regarding marijuana use. Instead of facing criminal charges, first-time offenders who smoke marijuana in public places will only receive a fine.
- March 12 – Ahmad Daqamseh, the Jordanian soldier who shot seven Israeli schoolchildren on March 13, 1997, is released from prison in Jordan.
- March 14 – A blaze at a fireworks warehouse near Netanya, central Israel, kills two people and injures five others.
- March 15 – Israel finished in 6th place at the 2017 World Baseball Classic
- March 17 –
  - Syria claims an Israeli fighter plane was shot down over Homs Governorate in an attack on a Pro-Assad forces in Palmyra, with the Syrian Army firing several S-200 missiles at Israeli jets above the Golan Heights.
  - The 2017 World Baseball Classic begins at the Gocheok Sky Dome, Seoul, South Korea, with the tournament debutant Israeli team upsetting the host nation team's 2–1 in extra innings.
- March 20 – Syrian Army shoots down an IDF Skylark drone over Syria's Quneitra Governorate.
- March 22 –
  - An IDF tank kills a Palestinian teenager and wounds two others near the Gaza border.
  - Israeli Air Force resumes bombing against suspected Hezbollah-related targets in Syria, with a fourth round of bombings occurring near military sites near Damascus.
  - Israeli archeologists uncover hundreds of gin and whiskey bottles dating back to the First World War at the site of a former British Army barracks in the town of Ramle.

=== April ===
- April 6 – An IDF soldier is killed in a car ramming attack near Ofra, in the West Bank. Another Israeli soldier was injured. A Palestinian suspected of committing the attack is arrested.
- April 14 – A 20 year old British student is stabbed to death by a Palestinian with two others, including a pregnant woman, injured in the attack. The perpetrator was arrested with Israeli Finance Minister Moshe Kahlon linking the attack to terrorism.
- April 17 – Hundreds of Palestinian prisoners in Israeli jails — activists say up to 1,500 are participating — begin an open-ended hunger strike to protest poor conditions and the Israeli policy of detention without trial.
- April 25 – Prime Minister of Israel Benjamin Netanyahu cancels a visit with the foreign minister of Germany Sigmar Gabriel after the latter's refusal to cancel a meeting with the Israel Defense Forces veterans NGO Breaking the Silence saying the group "slanders IDF soldiers as war criminals"
- April 27 – The Israeli Air Defense Command shoots down a Syrian Air Force drone using a MIM-104 Patriot missile.

=== May ===
- May 6 – Hamas, seeking to reconcile with rival Palestinian organizations, elects former Prime Minister Ismail Haniyeh its new leader, replacing term-limited Khaled Meshaal. Last week, Hamas dropped its longstanding call for Israel's destruction, and severed ties with the Muslim Brotherhood.
- May 13 –
  - Tayseer Abu Sneineh, who was convicted by Israel for his role in the 1980 Hebron attack, is elected mayor of the West Bank city of Hebron.
  - Imri Ziv represents Israel at the Eurovision Song Contest with the song “I Feel Alive”.
- 15 May – Launching of Israeli Broadcasting Corporation with stations KAN 11 and Makan 33
- 16 May –
  - Israeli Minister of Construction Yoav Galant announces that Syrian President Bashar al-Assad should be assassinated. Yesterday, the U.S. State Department accuses the al-Assad government of using a crematory at Sednaya Prison to cover up the mass murders of thousands of political prisoners. The Syrian government denies the accusations.
  - A U.S. intelligence report reveals that Israel was warned by U.S. federal officials not to share sensitive information with President Trump, out of fear that it could be leaked to Russia and Iran in the fallout of the classified information leak.
- 22 May – Donald Trump the President of the United States visits the Western Wall
- 24 May – Celebration of the 50th Jerusalem Day

=== June ===
- June 4 – Opening of the Assuta Ashdod Medical Center
- June 6 – U.S. authorities charge two operatives, Samer El Debek, 37, of Dearborn, Michigan, and Ali Kourani, 32, of the Bronx, New York, belonging to the Lebanese Shiite militant group Hezbollah with terrorism offenses, accused of plotting to target American and Israeli targets in New York and Panama.
- June 16 – An Israeli policewoman is fatally stabbed in two simultaneous attacks near the Damascus Gate in Jerusalem, with the three Palestinian assailants shot dead. ISIL claims were questioned by Israeli authorities. As well, the PFLP and Hamas claim it was their members who did it.
- June 24 –
  - Israel and Syria exchange artillery fire in the disputed Golan Heights, with Israel destroying several targets, including two Syrian tanks, with Israeli claims of Syrian casualties, with reports from Syrian forces that it is unknown. No Israeli troops were injured.
  - The 2017 Israeli Basketball Super League Final Four kicks off at the Menora Mivtachim Arena in Tel Aviv.
- June 25 – Israeli forces strikes two Syrian Army artillery positions and an ammunition truck in Quneitra Governorate, after stray shells from Syria land in the northern Golan Heights for a second day in a row.
- June 26 – The Jewish Agency for Israel Board of Governors cancels Monday's dinner with Israeli Prime Minister Benjamin Netanyahu to protest Sunday's decision by his cabinet to rescind plans for a mixed-gender prayer area at Jerusalem's Western Wall, a compromise agreement reached after three years of intense negotiations.

=== July ===
- July 2 – Israel arrests Palestinian lawmaker Khalida Jarrar over allegations of her inciting of violence.
- July 10 – Avi Gabbay, former minister of environmental protection in Benyamin Netanyahu's government, wins an upset victory in the primaries of the Israeli Labor Party, thus becoming leader of the opposition.
- 4–17 July – The 20th Maccabiah Games are held with 10,000 athletes from Israel and Jewish communities throughout the world competing in 45 sports.
- July 14 – Two Druze Israeli police officers are killed in an attack at Temple Mount in Jerusalem.
- July 21 –
  - Several thousand Palestinians protest Israel's installation of metal detectors and a ban on Muslim men under the age of 50 in response to the killing of two Israeli policemen last Friday at a contested Jerusalem holy place, known to Muslims as the Noble Sanctuary and to Jews as the Temple Mount.
  - Protest marches are also held in Indonesia, Jordan, Lebanon, Malaysia, and Turkey
  - Three Palestinians are killed, 390 people injured with dozens hospitalized in clashes in Jerusalem and the West Bank, according to the Red Crescent. Israeli police report five officers are wounded.
  - 2017 Halamish stabbing attack: Three Israelis are stabbed to death by a Palestinian in their home while eating dinner, according to Israeli officials.
  - United Nations deputy spokesman Farhan Haq calls for a de-escalation of violence and tensions at this site.
  - Egypt calls for an immediate halt to the violence underway around this site, urging Israel to show respect for Muslim sacred sites while accusing it of fomenting these tensions.
  - Turkish Prime Minister Binali Yıldırım says his country is in dialogue with Israel to end the crisis.
  - Palestinian President Mahmoud Abbas says the Palestinian leadership will “freeze contacts” with Israel “on all levels.”
- July 22 – A United Nations Security Council session is to be held to address the escalating violence in Jerusalem.
- July 23 – A Jordanian is killed and a Jordanian, dead, and an Israeli and a Jordanian injured in a shooting at the Israeli embassy in Amman, Jordan, leaves one person, a Jordanian, dead, and an Israeli and a Jordanian wounded. There is speculation the attack may be linked to recent events at Jerusalem's Al-Aqsa Mosque. Another Jordanian man was killed inadvertently.
- July 24 – Israel's embassy staff in Jordan, including a security guard involved in a shooting incident in which two Jordanians were killed yesterday, return to Israel from Amman. Israeli Prime Minister Benjamin Netanyahu thanked U.S. President Donald Trump and Jordan's King Abdullah for their help and cooperation.
- July 24 – The Israeli government says it will remove metal detectors and some cameras recently installed at the entrances to the Temple Mount in Jerusalem that resulted in a wave of protests and some deaths. Instead, less obtrusive surveillance means will be used.

=== August ===
- August 2 – A an Israeli civilian is critically injured in a stabbing attack by a Palestinian at a Shufersal supermarket in Yavne. The assailant was arrested in Yatta, Hebron, West Bank.
- August 6 – Israel announces plans to shut down all of Al Jazeera's operations in the country, alleging support of terrorism.
- August 11 – The world's oldest man, Polish–Israeli Yisrael Kristal, who was also recognized as the oldest living Holocaust survivor, dies at age 113 years, 330 days, in Haifa, Israel.
- August 19 – Israel at the 2017 Summer Universiade begins in Taipei, Taiwan.
- August 24 – A 6th century mosaic dated from the rule of Justinian I is discovered while installing communication cables in Jerusalem's Old City.
- August 31 – Israel hosts the EuroBasket 2017 Group B at the Menora Mivtachim Arena in Tel Avi.

=== September ===
- September 7 – Israeli airstrikes on a military research facility near the city of Masyaf, Hama Governorate, kills at least two Syrian Army soldiers, with the facility rumoured to had contain chemical weapons.
- September 13 – The Israeli Supreme Court strikes down legislative amendments relating to Haredi conscription.
- September 26 – Three Israelis are killed and one other is wounded after a Palestinian gunman opens fire in an entrance to the Israeli settlement of Har Adar in the West Bank.
- September 27 – Along with the Solomon Islands, the State of Palestine joins Interpol despite Israeli objections.

=== October ===
- October 12 –
  - The U.S. Trump administration and the Israeli government announce their plans to withdraw as members of UNESCO.
  - Palestinian factions, Hamas and Fatah, sign a unity deal in Cairo, that is also publicly supported by the governments of Egypt and Saudi Arabia. The Fatah-controlled Palestinian National Authority (PNA), along with Israel, currently govern the West Bank. According to the signatories of the deal, the PNA will take administrative control of the Gaza Strip, and, along with Hamas, police its borders. The signatories consider the agreement a first step, and, if productive, plan to meet next month to address the remaining issues. The Israeli government opposes any involvement by Hamas in a Palestinian government.
- October 16 – An Israeli airstrike destroys a Syrian S-200 anti-aircraft battery near Damascus after it fired on its aircraft patrolling in Lebanese air space on a reconnaissance mission.
- October 22 – A Palestinian man of the West Bank is arrested and questioned for a few hours by Israeli police after Facebook mistranslates his Arabic language message saying "good morning" into Hebrew for "attack them".
- October 30 – The Israeli Defense Forces destroys a partly-completed tunnel from the Gaza border near the town of Khan Yunis that crossed into Israeli territory, killing seven Hamas militants with several more having died in the rescue efforts.

=== November ===
- November 8 – British politician Priti Patel resigns from her position as Secretary of State for International Development amid reports that she had had unauthorized meetings with senior Israeli officials.

=== December ===
- December 2 – Israel launches surface-to-surface missiles at a military installation outside the Syrian capital Damascus overnight, Syrian state TV reports.
- December 3 –

In Tel Aviv, up to 20,000 people demonstrate in front of the home of the Attorney General of Israel, Avichai Mandelblit, against the slow pace of corruption investigations against Prime Minister of Israel Benjamin Netanyahu.

- December 4 –
  - Israeli launches airstrikes on military facilities near Damascus.
  - Jordan's foreign minister Ayman Safadi has warned the U.S. of "dangerous consequences" if it recognizes Jerusalem as the capital of Israel.
  - Hamas calls the U.S. government's plan to recognize Jerusalem as the capital of Israel "a flagrant attack on the city by the American administration" and threatens to start a Third Intifada.
- December 5 –
  - Turkish President Recep Tayyip Erdoğan tells Donald Trump that Turkey might cut ties with Israel if the United States unilaterally recognizes Jerusalem as its capital.
  - According to a Palestinian spokesman, Donald Trump calls Mahmoud Abbas, "outlining his intentions" to move the U.S. embassy to Jerusalem. The Palestinian President warns him against the dangers of such a step and says that he will continue reaching out to world leaders to prevent it from happening.
- December 6 –
  - The White House announces that Donald Trump has officially recognized Jerusalem as the capital of Israel and says the U.S. starts the process of moving its embassy from Tel Aviv to Jerusalem. The United States Department of State issues an internal travel warning to Israel, Jerusalem and the West Bank until December 20. The U.S. embassy in Amman temporarily suspends routine public services and stops embassy travel around Jordan. Embassies in Berlin and London issue vigilance warnings to U.S. citizens.
  - Israeli Prime Minister Benjamin Netanyahu praises the announcement as a "historic landmark."
  - Secretary-General of the United Nations António Guterres criticizes the announcement, saying that it "would jeopardise the prospect of peace for Israelis and Palestinians".
- December 7 – The Czech Republic recognizes West Jerusalem as Israel's capital "in practice".
- December 8 –
  - Russia's Minister of Foreign Affairs Sergei Lavrov says that the recognition of Jerusalem as Israel's capital by the United States "runs counter to common sense."
  - Clashes erupt in Bethlehem and Hebron. Dozens of people throw stones at Israel Defense Forces who reply with tear gas and water cannon. More than 200 people are wounded. One person was killed. The Health Minister of the Palestinian National Authority named the man killed on the Gaza border.
  - Demonstrators across the Arab and Muslim worlds take to the streets on Friday, holy day, expressing solidarity with the Palestinians and outrage at the U.S. move.
- December 9 – Hundreds of people protest on the West Bank and in Gaza for the third day in a row.
- December 10 – An Israeli security guard is seriously injured in a Palestinian stabbing attack at Jerusalem's Central Bus Station. The attacker is arrested.
- December 11 – Hassan Nasrallah, the Secretary-General of Hezbollah, vows to return to Israel. Tens of thousands of people demonstrate in South Beirut.
- December 13 –
  - Hamas fires rockets towards Israel from Gaza. With the Iron Dome system intercepting two missiles, with one rocket falling in a desolate area with no injuries.
  - The leader of Hamas, Ismail Haniyeh, calls for a new revolt or intifada.
- December 14 – Israeli company Teva Pharmaceutical, the world's largest generic drug manufacturer, is restructuring in order to pay off debt, and will be cutting its work force by about a quarter.
- December 15 –

Palestinians and the Israeli security forces clash in Jerusalem, Bethlehem and at the Qalandia border crossing over the status of Jerusalem. Clashes are also reported in Gaza, Ramallah, Hebron and Qalqilya. Israeli shootings kills two Palestinians and injures 150 in Gaza with two killed and 10 injured in the West Bank.

- December 17 – Turkish President Recep Tayyip Erdoğan, announces "the day is close when officially, with God's permission" his nation will open an embassy to Palestine in East Jerusalem.
- December 18 –

The United States vetoes a United Nations Security Council resolution calling for it to withdraw its declaration of a capital in Jerusalem, which was approved by the other 14 members.

- December 20 –
  - President Trump suggests that the United States could withhold foreign aid for countries that vote in favor of a United Nations resolution calling on the U.S. to withdraw its recognition of Jerusalem as Israel's capital.
  - Palestinian Ahed Tamimi, daughter of Bassem al-Tamimi, is arrested on December 19 in a pre-dawn raid on her home in Nabi Salih by the Israeli army after being suspected of assaulting an Israeli soldier. Later in the day, her mother Nariman is allegedly arrested too when visiting her daughter at a police station.
- December 21 – The United Nations General Assembly votes 128–9, with 35 abstentions, in a nonbinding resolution to demand that the United States rescind its December 6th declaration on unilaterally recognizing the holy and contested city of Jerusalem as Israel's capital.
- December 22 –
  - Two Palestinians are shot dead and about 60 others are wounded by Israeli troops gunfire as thousands protest along the Gaza border fence, in all seven West Bank cities and in East Jerusalem, against the U.S. declaration.
  - Palestinian President Mahmoud Abbas says he will not accept any U.S. plan for peace with Israel, because it recognized Jerusalem as Israel's capital.
- December 24 – Guatemalan President Jimmy Morales announces the move of the country's Israeli embassy from Tel Aviv to Jerusalem.
- December 26 – Seven Israeli chess players are denied travel visas to the Rapid and Blitz Chess Championships in Saudi Arabia as the two countries have no diplomatic relations. Players from Qatar and Iran are given last-minute visas, while Ukrainian champion Anna Muzychuk refuses to participate because she does not want to wear an abaya.
- December 27 –
  - Israel's Transportation Minister Yisrael Katz says that the new underground railroad terminal in the Jewish Quarter in the Old City of East Jerusalem) will be named in honor of U.S. President Donald Trump.
  - The Iranian Parliament votes 207–0 to declare Jerusalem the "everlasting capital" of Palestine.
- December 31 – Palestine recalls its envoy to the United States for "consultations," following U.S. President Trump's recognition of Jerusalem as the capital of Israel. Palestinian President Mahmoud Abbas announces that he will not accept any U.S. peace plan in the wake of Trump's move.

== Deaths ==
- January 1 – Yaakov Neeman (born 1939), lawyer and politician, former Minister of Justice and Minister of Finance
- January 13 – Ari Rath (born 1925), journalist and editor, former editor of The Jerusalem Post
- January 22 – Moshe Gershuni (born 1936), painter and sculptor
- February 5 – Gila Goldstein (born 1947), actress, singer and activist
- March 2 – David Rubinger (born 1924), photographer who took a famous photograph of Israeli Paratroopers at the Western Wall
- March 24 – Avraham Sharir (born 1932), politician and government minister
- May 1 – Yisrael Friedman (born 1923), Romanian-born Israeli rabbi
- July 23 - Amir Fryszer Guttman (born 1976) Singer and Gay rights activist died while saving his niece from drowning.

== See also ==
- 2017 in the Palestinian territories
- Timeline of the Israeli–Palestinian conflict in 2017
