= 2016 in Israel =

- Decades: 1990s; 2000s; 2010s; 2020s
- See also: History of Israel; Timeline of Israeli history; List of years in Israel

The following lists events in the year 2016 in Israel.

== Incumbents ==
- President – Reuven Rivlin
- Prime Minister – Benjamin Netanyahu
- Government of Israel – 34th government of Israel
- President of the Supreme Court – Miriam Naor
- Chief of General Staff – Gadi Eizenkot

== Events ==
=== January ===
- January 1 – Tel Aviv shooting

=== February ===
- February 12-21 – Israel sent 2 athletes to the 2016 Winter Youth Olympics

=== March ===
- March 8 - Tel Aviv stabbings
- March 23 – Yisrael Beiteinu formally joins the Thirty-fourth government of Israel
- March 24 – Hebron shooting incident

=== May ===
- 14 May – Hovi Star represents Israel at the Eurovision Song Contest with the song “Made of Stars”.
- May 27 – First ever Miss Trans Israel

=== June ===
- June 8 – Tel Aviv shooting

=== July ===
- June 6-10 – Israel sent 17 athletes to the 2016 European Athletics Championships
- June 28-August 6 – Israel men's national lacrosse team competed in the 2016 European Lacrosse Championship, winning the silver medal.

=== August ===
- August 5–21 – 47 athletes from Israel competed at the 2016 Summer Olympics in Rio de Janeiro, Brazil
- August 29 - Opening of the Migdal HaEmek – Kfar Baruch Railway Station

=== September ===
- September 1 – AMOS 6 satellite is destroyed during launch testing
- September 2-4 - Israel national American football team competed in the European Championship of American football for the first time, losing both of their games
- September 7-18 - Israel sent 33 athletes to compete in the 2016 Summer Paralympics
- September 13 – Ofek 11 satellite launches from Palmachim Airbase
- September 23 - Israel qualified for the 2017 World Baseball Classic

=== November ===
- November 22 – November 2016 Israel wildfires

=== December ===
- December 12 – Israel received its first pair of F-35 Lightning II from the United States.

== Deaths ==
- February 13 – Avigdor Ben-Gal, general (b. 1936)
- March 17 – Meir Dagan, army officer and Mossad Director-General. (b. 1945)
- August 28 – Binyamin Ben-Eliezer, general and politician (b. 1936)
- September 28 – Shimon Peres, Former Prime Minister of Israel (b. 1923)

== See also ==
- Israel at the 2016 Summer Olympics
- Timeline of the Israeli–Palestinian conflict in 2016
