= 25th anniversary of Hamas =

2012 celebration of the founding of Hamas

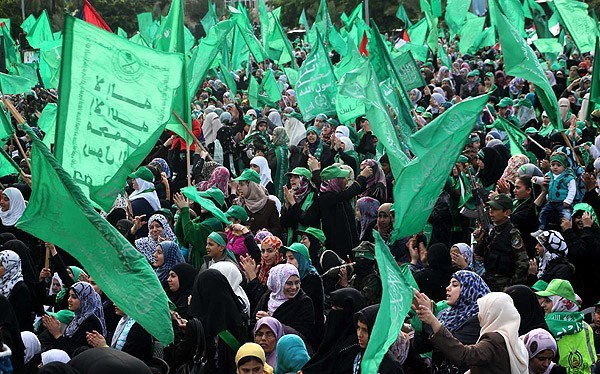
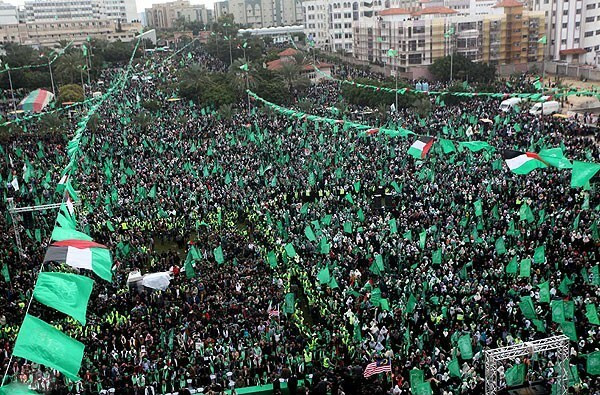
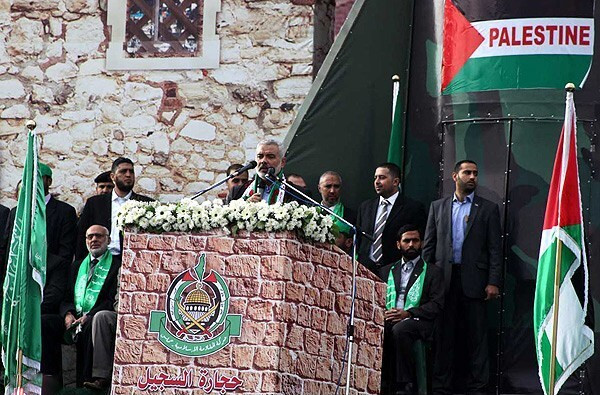
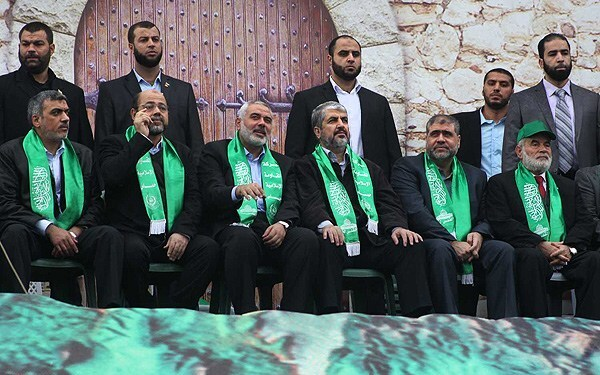
Top-left: attendees of the anniversary.
Top-right: the rally in the Gaza Strip.
Bottom-left: Ismail Haniyeh delivering a speech.
Bottom-right: members of the Hamas Political Bureau.

The 25th anniversary of Hamas took place on 8 December 2012. The main rally was held in Gaza City, drawing 200,000-500,000 attendees, with smaller rallies held in the West Bank. Hamas leaders Ismail Haniyeh and Khaled Mashal gave speeches at the rally. Mashal, the ceremony's guest of honor, stated in his speech that Hamas would never recognize Israel and called for the establishment of an Islamic state in the region. The celebration was seen as a sign of reconciliation with rival Palestinian faction Fatah and was decried by Israeli politicians.

== Background ==
Hamas formed in 1987, during the First Intifada, as an outgrowth of the Palestinian branch of the Muslim Brotherhood. It has governed the Gaza Strip since June 2007, after it won a majority of seats in the Palestinian Legislative Council in the 2006 Palestinian elections and engaged in a series of conflicts with Fatah. The group had seen an increase in support following the Arab Spring and rise of the Muslim Brotherhood. In November 2012, the Israel Defense Forces launched a military campaign against Hamas and other groups in the Gaza Strip, killing 170 Palestinians and 6 Israelis.

Israel, the United States, the European Union, and many western countries view Hamas as a terrorist organization.

== Activities ==
=== Gaza Strip ===
The rally was rescheduled to be held a week earlier than originally planned to coincide with the anniversary of the first Intifada. The rally was broadcast on Palestine TV. 200,000-500,000 people attended the rally, the largest turnout for an event since Hamas's founding. Rallygoers included 2,500-3,000 members of delegations from Algeria, Bahrain, Egypt, Indonesia, Jordan, Kuwait, Lebanon, Libya, Malaysia, Mauritania, Qatar, Saudi Arabia, Tunisia, and Turkey. Moussa Abu Marzouk, Izzat Al-Risheq, and leaders from Fatah also attended the rally. Saleh Al-Arouri, Ramadan Shalah, and Ziyad al-Nakhalah originally planned to attend but were blocked by Israel. The main rally was held in Al-Katiba square in Gaza City with rallygoers wearing green headbands and waving green flags. The backdrop of the main stage was a panoramic picture of Jerusalem, including the al-Aqsa mosque, a symbol of Hamas. Portraits of Hamas founder Sheikh Ahmed Yassin and Hamas military commander assassinated in an Israeli strike Ahmed Jabari framed the stage alongside a model of a M-75 rocket.

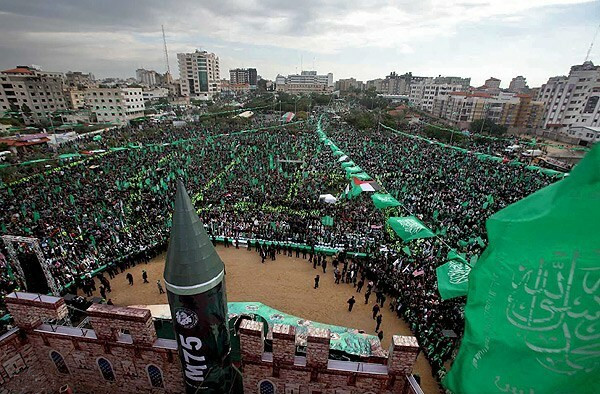
Gaza rally

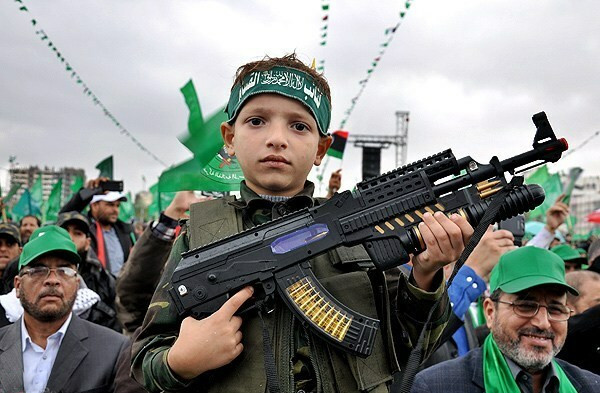
Young boy

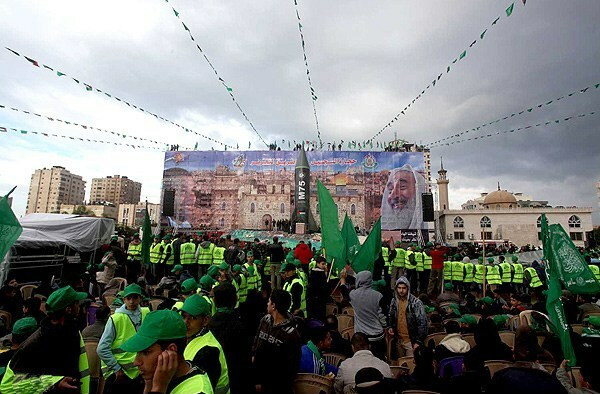
Large rocket model

==== Speeches ====
The rally began with a speech from a man with his face covered by a keffiyeh, identified only as a senior leader of the Al-Qassam Brigades.

Prime minister Ismail Haniyeh delivered a speech at the rally stating that Hamas was working to liberate "all our occupied Palestinian territories" and that the group's "victory" in the November 2012 Gaza War was the beginning of the collapse of Israel.

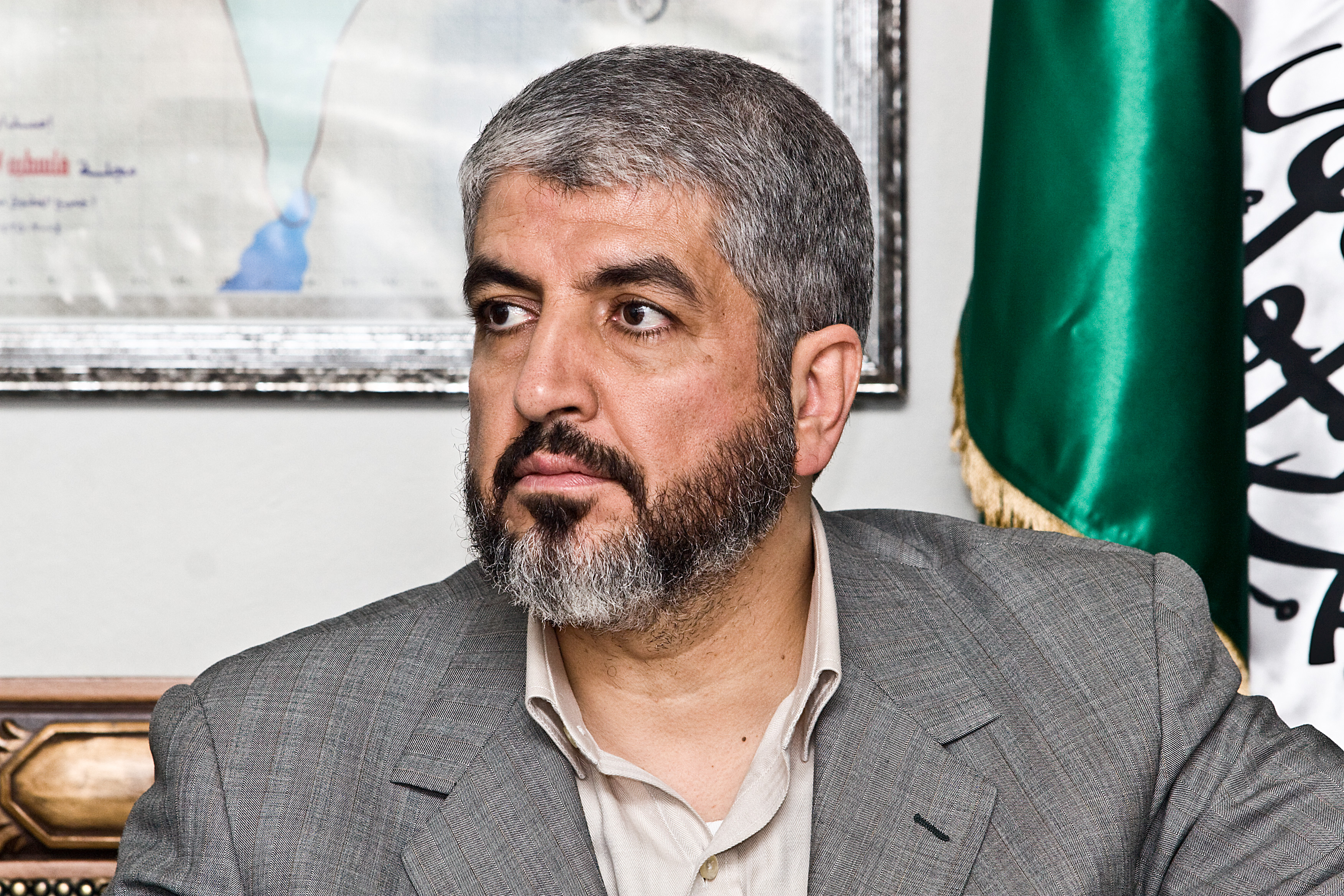
Hamas leader Khaled Mashal arrived in the Gaza Strip for the first time ever for the 25th anniversary of Hamas.

Hamas leader in-exile Khaled Mashal made his first visit to the Gaza Strip for the rally as the guest of honor. In his speech, Mashal stated that Hamas would never recognize Israel and called for the establishment of an Islamic state in the region. He criticized Bashar al-Assad for his crackdown on the Syrian revolution and praised Egypt as "our backer". He called the recognition of Palestine as a non-member observer state at the United Nations as a "small step but a good one". He appealed for an end to the dispute between Hamas and Fatah. He stated that Hamas would fight to free Palestinians in Israeli custody and called for armed resistance as "the right and real way to liberate Palestine".

=== West Bank ===
Rallies were held in Nablus, Hebron, Ramallah, and Tulkarm drawing thousands of supporters. The permitting of rallies in the West Bank by Fatah was seen as a sign of reconciliation between the rival factions. The Palestinian Authority had banned Hamas from holding public events in the West Bank since 2007.

== Reactions ==
=== Palestine ===
Palestinian Authority President Mahmoud Abbas announced on 9 December 2012 that reconciliation talks between Fatah and Hamas would resume in Cairo. Azzam al-Ahmad praised Mashal's speech for calling for an end to the dispute between Fatah and Hamas. Hamas allowed Fatah to hold celebrations of its 48th anniversary in the Gaza Strip in January 2026 in return for the Palestinian Authority allowing rallies by Hamas in the West Bank.

=== Israel ===
Prime Minister Benjamin Netanyahu told the Cabinet that the rally "re-exposed [us] to our enemies' true face" and that "They have no intention of compromising with us; they want to destroy the state." He criticized Abbas for not condemning Hamas. President Shimon Peres agreed with Netanyahu's views of Hamas but maintained that Abbas was a "peace partner".

Netanyahu spokesman Mark Regev stated that the rally "should serve as a wake-up call to anyone who has illusions about the extremist and murderous character of Hamas" and that Meshal's speech "says no to peace and no to reconciliation". Kadima chairman Shaul Mofaz called for the killing of Mashal and all of Hamas's leadership.

=== European Union ===
The European Union denounced statements by Mashal "that deny Israel's right to exist" as "unacceptable". It also condemned Israeli plans to construct settlements in the E1 area of Jerusalem.

== See also ==
- History of Hamas
