= Beersheba bank shooting =

2013 mass shooting in Israel

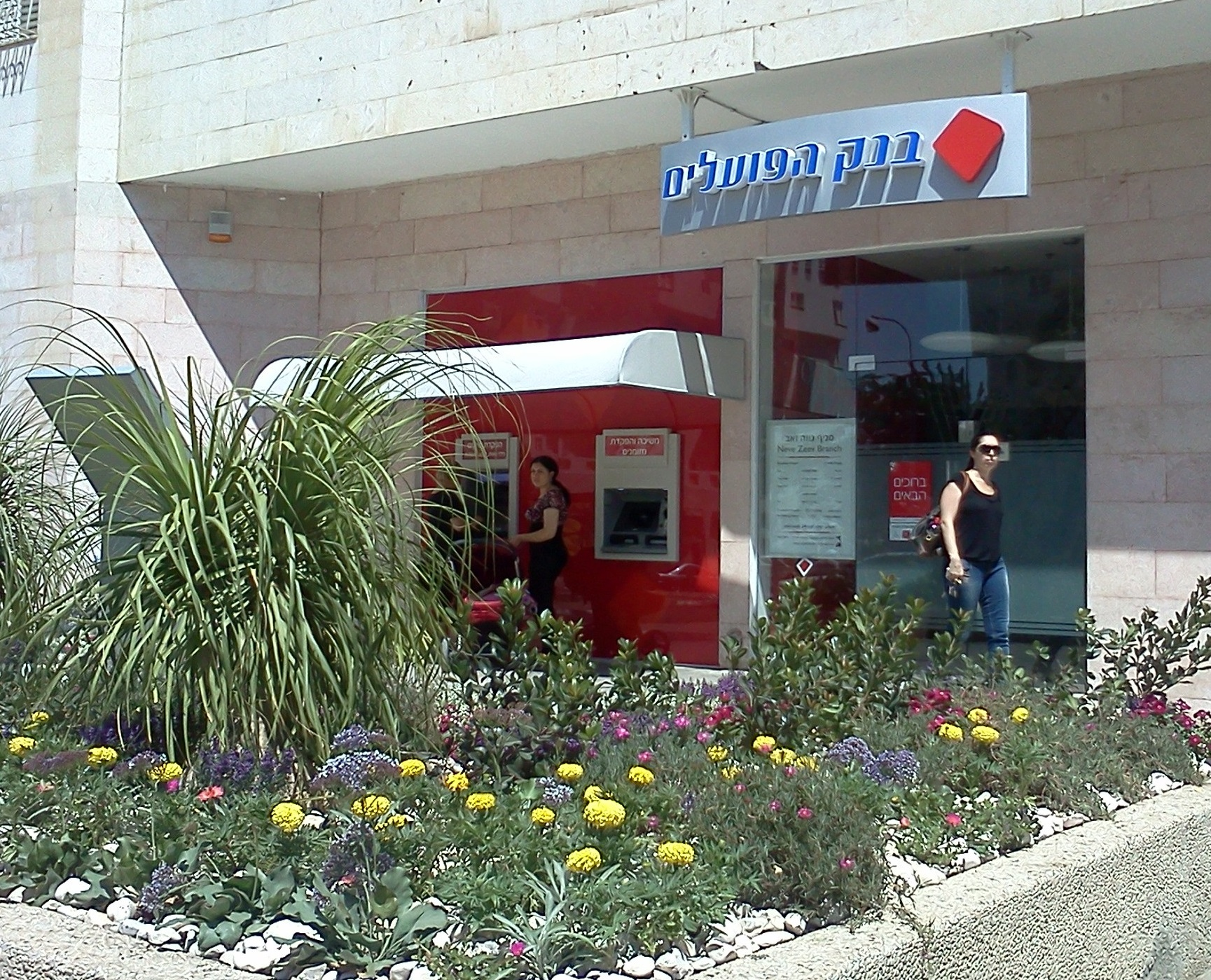
- The Bank Hapoalim branch in Beersheba where the shooting occurred, pictured two months after the incident.

- Beersheba (Northern Negev region of Israel) Beersheba (Israel)
- Native name: הרצח בסניף בנק הפועלים בבאר שבע
- Location: 31.2388°N 34.7736°E; Bank Hapoalim,Neve Ze'ev, Beersheba, Israel
- Date: May 20, 2013; 13 years ago 1:00 pm (EDT)
- Target: Bank workers
- Attack type: Mass shooting, murder-suicide
- Weapon: .45-caliber Glock 21 semi-automatic pistol
- Deaths: 5 (including the perpetrator)
- Injuries: 5
- Perpetrator: Itamar Alon
- Motive: Financial issues

On May 20, 2013, a mass shooting occurred in a Bank Hapoalim branch located in Beersheba, Israel. Itamar Alon entered into the bank and opened fire, killing four and wounding five. He then took a woman hostage and killed himself when police arrived.

== Background ==
The shooter, Itamar Alon (Hebrew: איתמר אלון), was a 39-year-old Beersheba resident. He had done his mandatory military service in the Israel Defense Forces in the Combat Engineering Corps, and he rose to become an officer. He later transferred to the Israel Border Police, and participated in joint patrols with Palestinian police in the Tulkarm area.

After completing his active service, he began working as a security guard for educational institutions and the Beersheba municipality, and served as a platoon commander in a reserve battalion. In 2002, he was caught in a shooting attack by two Palestinian militants in which two Israeli soldiers were killed, and killed one of the militants with his pistol. He was awarded a medal by Beersheba mayor Yaakov Turner. That same year, he was fired by the municipality at the end of his trial period of employment due to poor relations with co-workers. He was also transferred from his position as a reserve platoon commander to command a rearguard battalion in the IDF Home Front Command due to aggressive behavior and poor judgement.

In 2011, the Israel Police requested that Alon be stripped of his private gun license after he had been involved in a dispute with his neighbors and suspicions over him committing violence against his parents had emerged. After a court hearing, Alon was allowed to keep his gun license.

In May 2013, Alon's credit card was cancelled after he had accumulated a debt of about NIS 6,000, and the card was swallowed by an ATM when he tried to use it.

== Shooting ==
On May 20, 2013, he visited the Bank Hapoalim branch in the Neve Ze'ev neighborhood of Beersheba requesting a debt settlement, and was refused. At around 1:00 p.m., Alon returned to the Bank Hapoalim branch armed with a .45-caliber Glock 21 semiautomatic pistol and sat down together with other people waiting for services. He then got up and opened fire. The branch's manager, Avner Cohen and his deputy Meir Zeitun were killed, as were two customers, Idan Sabri and Anat Even-Haim.

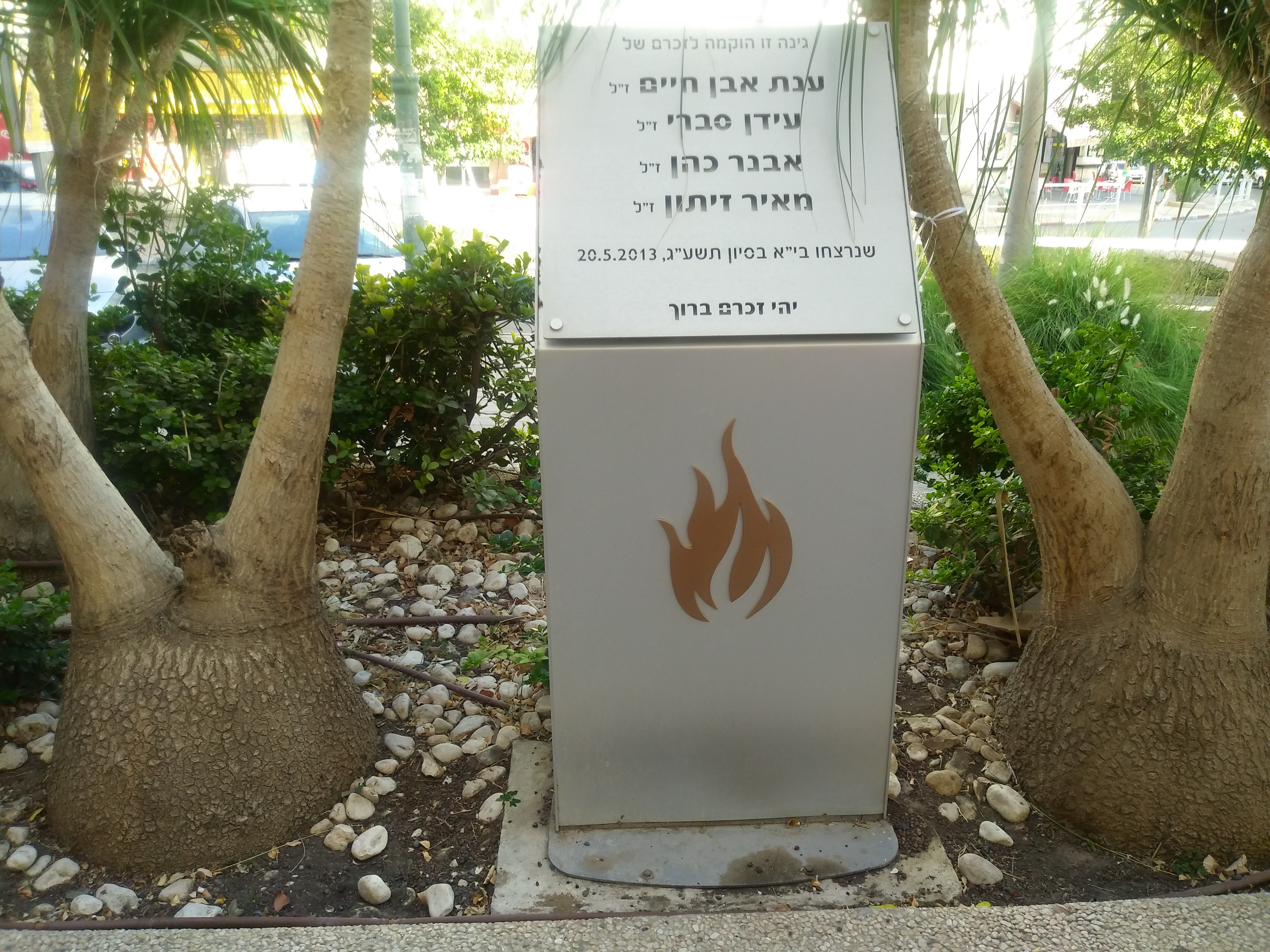
Memorial established for the four victims.

According to eyewitness accounts, Alon shot the two bank employees multiple times to ensure that they were dead. Five other people were wounded. Alon then took a woman, Miri Cohen, an employee of the bank, as a hostage, and barricaded himself with her in a bathroom. Within three minutes of the start of the shooting, the police arrived, with one policeman shooting a flowerpot as a deterrent as officers entered, and began searching for the shooter. One of the wounded victims was temporarily handcuffed after being mistaken for the shooter by police. After it became known that the shooter was in a bathroom together with a hostage, a police officer fired a single shot into the bathroom. The police negotiated with Alon until he shot himself. He was taken to Soroka Medical Center, where he died. Police officials stated that there was no security guard at the bank at the time of the incident.

There is some security footage of the shooting, but it is blocked to people outside of Israel.

== Reactions ==
Israeli Prime Minister Benjamin Netanyahu called the shooting "a terrible tragedy". He said that mass shootings are an uncommon phenomenon in Israel.
