= Ari Rath =

Austrian-born Israeli journalist and writer (1925–2017)

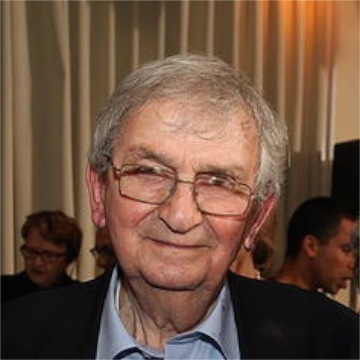
Ari Rath in 2015

Ari Rath (Hebrew: ארי רט; 6 January 1925 – 13 January 2017) was an Austrian-born Israeli journalist and writer.

== Biography ==
Arnold (Ari) Rath was born in Vienna and grew up there. After the Anschluss, he came through a Kindertransport as a thirteen-year-old boy to Mandate Palestine. He arrived in Palestine together with his older brother. As one of the founders of Kibbutz Hamadia he lived there for 16 years and studied contemporary history and economics. Rath never married.

He regained his Austrian citizenship in 2007 and lived there until his death, shortly after his 92nd birthday. He lectured about the country's Nazi past and political developments in Austria and Israel. In 2012, he published his memoirs in German, “Ari heißt Löwe” (Ari Means Lion).

Rath died on 13 January 2017 in Vienna at the age of 92.

== Journalism career ==
After turning to journalism, he became editor of The Jerusalem Post in 1975, and in 1979 was appointed its editor-in-chief. In this capacity, he belonged, together with Shimon Peres, to the inner circle of friends of David Ben-Gurion. According to a Jerusalem Post journalist who worked with him, his joint editorship with Erwin Frenkel in 1975–1989 "provided a contrast in styles and personalities – Frenkel’s cool, almost unflappable detachment and Rath’s excitable, emotional character, quick to explode in anger and just as quick to forgive, forget and embrace."

After leaving The Jerusalem Post in 1989, he worked as a freelance writer, taught at the University of Potsdam and was news editor of the online journal Partners for Peace.

Rath was an advocate for a peaceful coexistence of Israelis and Palestinians. He was a founding member of the Next Century Foundation, a second-track group working for peace and reconciliation.

== Awards and recognition ==
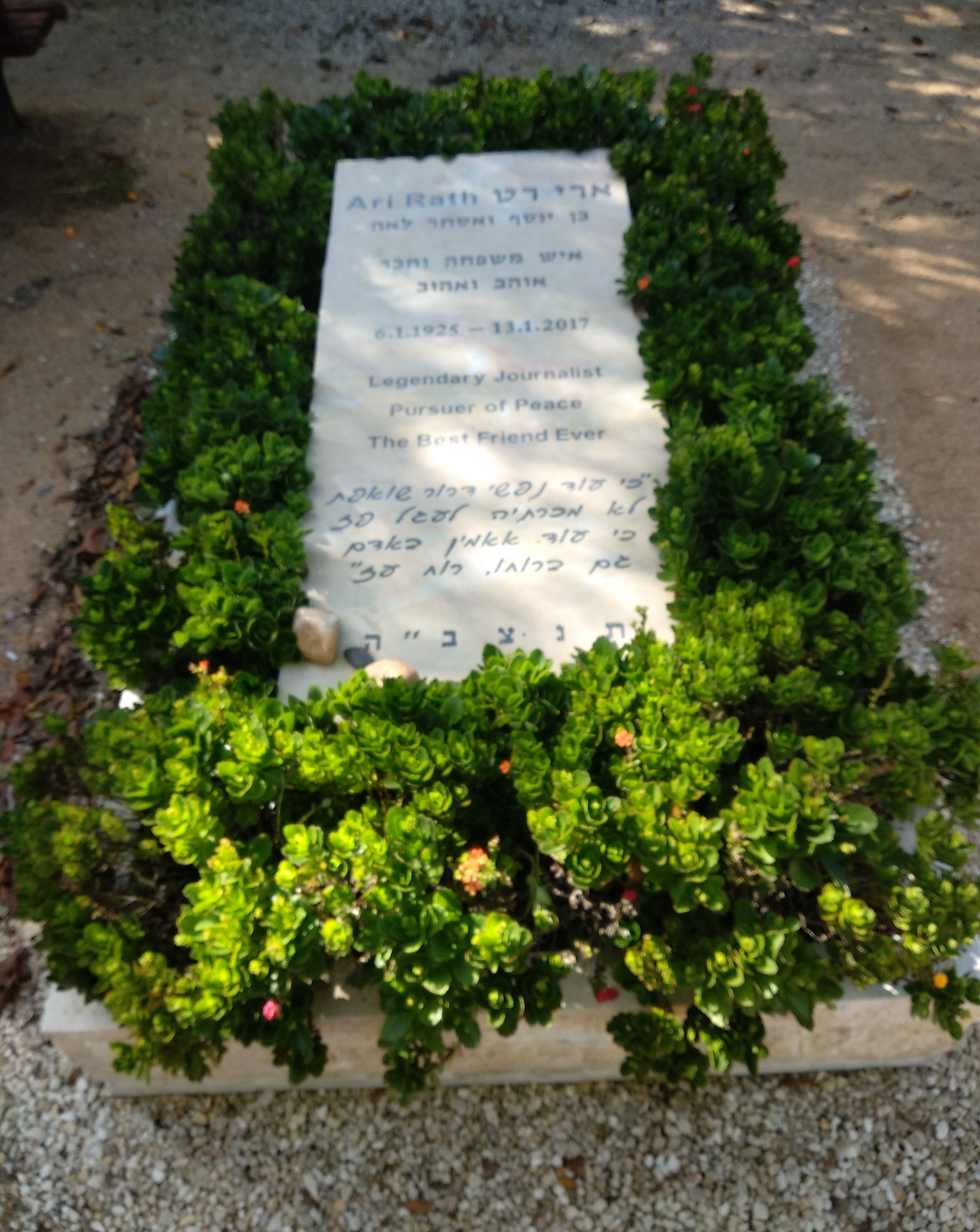
Burial site in Givat Hashlosha

For his contribution to Israeli-German/Austrian dialog he was awarded several honors. In 2005 he won the German Bundesverdienstkreuz. His last award, for his "dialog between Vienna and Israel", was the Goldenes Ehrenzeichen (golden badge of honor) of the city of Vienna.

In 2005, Rath received a Special Prize in the British House of Lords in the shape of an olive tree from the International Council for Press and Broadcasting in recognition of his achievement and tireless work for rapprochement and peace. This was in lieu of the Peace for Media awards, which were not given that year.

== Published works ==
- Rath, Ari a.o. Auf dem Weg zum Frieden. Artikel und Essays aus fünf Jahrzehnten, Berlin 2005.
- Rath, Ari; Frenkel, Erwin. Front page Israel. Major events 1932–1986 as reflected in the front pages of The Jerusalem Post, Jerusalem 1986, ISBN 0-933503-09-1.
