= Death of Gabriel Cadis =

Gabriel Cadis (1951 – 6 January 2012) headed the Eastern Orthodox Church Association in Jaffa, Israel. He served as a senior figure and attorney for the organisation until his death in 2012. Gadis won a third term as leader of the Greek Orthodox in Jaffa a month prior to his death. He was viewed as an important figure in local politics and it is speculated that his electoral victory "triggered deep tensions with some of his rivals."

== Death ==
Cadis was murdered during a parade outside St. George's Church celebrating the Nativity of Jesus according to the Eastern church calendar. Eyewitnesses reported an unidentified man wearing a Santa Claus outfit stabbing Cadis and fleeing the scene. Cadis then shouted: "I've been stabbed", and collapsed to the floor. He was evacuated to the Wolfson Medical Center where he was pronounced dead on arrival. Israeli police established a special unit to investigate Cadis's murder.

== Investigation ==
Six Israeli-Arabs were arrested in connection with Cadis' murder. Four members of the same Christian-Arab family remain in custody. One of the suspects includes Talal Abu Maneh who ran for the position of chairman of the Jaffa Orthodox Church Association twice, and lost to Cadis each time. Investigators are looking into "the possibility that Cadis was murdered over a real estate dispute or power struggles within the Jaffa Orthodox Church Association."

== Reaction ==
- Ahmad Masarweh, a Tel Aviv city council member, said: "This is a shock to Jaffa and a hard blow to the Christian community. We had a successful procession. Cadis made a speech and everything was fine until he all the sudden this happened. We are shocked because we can't imagine who would want to hurt him." Jaffa residents described Cadis' death like "an earthquake".
- Atallah Hanna, a senior leader of the Jerusalem Orthodox Patriarchate, described the perpetrator as a killer of "Christmas joy" and one who "killed the human and spiritual values embodied by Father Christmas – who makes children happy on Christmas Eve..."
