= 2017 Yavne attack =

Palestinian terror attack against civilians in Yavne, Israel

2017 Yavneh attack
- Part of Israeli–Palestinian conflict
- The attack site
- Location: 31°53′N 34°44′E; Yavne, Israel
- Date: 2 August 2017; 9 years ago (UTC+3)
- Target: Civilians
- Attack type: Stabbing
- Weapon: Knife
- Deaths: 0
- Injuries: 1 (critically injured)
- Perpetrator: 1 Palestinian

External videos
- Footage of apparent terror stabbing in Yavneh released, 2 August 2017. (Warning: graphic footage)

On 2 August 2017, a 19-year old Palestinian teen critically injured an Israeli civilian with a knife at a local supermarket in the city of Yavne, located in the Central District of Israel. The attacker was subsequently arrested after being captured by civilians who were at the spot. Police confirmed the attack was an act of terrorism.

The assailant was later identified as Ismail Abu Aram, resident of Yatta, Hebron, located in the West Bank.

== Attack ==
Shortly before noon, a knife-wielding man entered a Shufersal supermarket in Yavneh, Israel. Then, he approached an employee at the market, Niv Nehemiah, waiting for him to turn around, and then stabbed him fifteen times in his head and the neck as Nehemiah fought off the attacker; the incident was captured on the store's security cameras. Despite being gravely injured, Nehemiah fought off the assailant, tried to run away, and then blocked the assailant with a shopping cart, events shown on security camera footage released by authorities later. The assailant then fled the supermarket and was captured outside by civilians who held him subdued to the ground, one of the civilians pulled out a gun, however, he was told by other civilians "Don't go overboard". The capture of the assailant outside of the supermarket was also recorded on a cellphone video.

Prior to attacking the employee, the assailant reportedly asked a shopper if he worked at the supermarket; however he didn't attack. Some 15 minutes before the attack, the assailant asked the victim on the whereabouts of the bathroom in the compound. The original target was the attacker's former employer, using a knife he would steal and a can of pepper spray he brought with him, however due to availability he decided to kill a different Israeli.

== Victim ==
Nehemiah (42), the deputy manager at the supermarket, where the attack occurred, was severely wounded and taken to Kaplan Medical Center in Rehovot. He was unconscious and in critical condition for 4 days, and underwent a series of surgical operations, In addition he was hooked up to a respirator while being held in the intensive care unit. On 12 August, Nehemiah was visited by Benjamin Netanyahu On 21 August, Nehemiah, unable to speak due to damage to his vocal cords, gave a written statement to the media stating that he remembers the entire attack. On 27 August, he was released from the hospital.

President Reuven Rivlin phoned the victim's wife, hailing the victim as a hero and assuring her that the entire country is praying for her husband. Prime minister Benjamin Netanyahu praised the victim for fighting valiantly against the assailant, and subsequently visited the stabbing victim, who was critically injured from stabs to the neck and torso and was unconsciousness for a few days, on 8 August 2017, six days after the attack.

== Perpetrator ==
The assailant, Ismail Abu Aram, 19-years old Palestinian teen from Yatta, Hebron, without a prior security offence background. According to the Shin Bet, Aby Aram did not have a permit to enter Israel, and Netanyahu later visited the spot where he crossed the Green Line. Following the attack Abu Aram attempted to flee the scene, but ultimately was detained by Israeli authorities. He was indicted on 28 August 2017, the indictment stated that the assailant traveled to Saudi Arabia in order to perform an Umrah, as part of a strengthening of his Islamic belief, and that he set out to attack a Jew in order to fulfill the Islamic commandment of Jihad. During his 12-day visit for Ramadan to Mecca, he decided to "fulfill his duty to jihad", to "kill a Jew" and to carry out "the commandment of jihad against the Jewish Israeli occupation."

Under Israeli criminal law, attempted murder can be charged as murder, which the victims family has requested.

== Aftermath ==
Israel Defense Forces (IDF) forces raided the home of the assailant in the city of Yatta, and arrested his father. Clashes developed between IDF forces and the residents of the city during the raid. Yatta is known as the hometown of many assailants, including the perpetrators of the June 2016 Tel Aviv shooting. The city of Yatta was then cordoned off by the IDF, blocking all entrances and exits to the city.

== See also ==
- 2017 Hamburg attack
