= Michael Lev =

Yiddish author

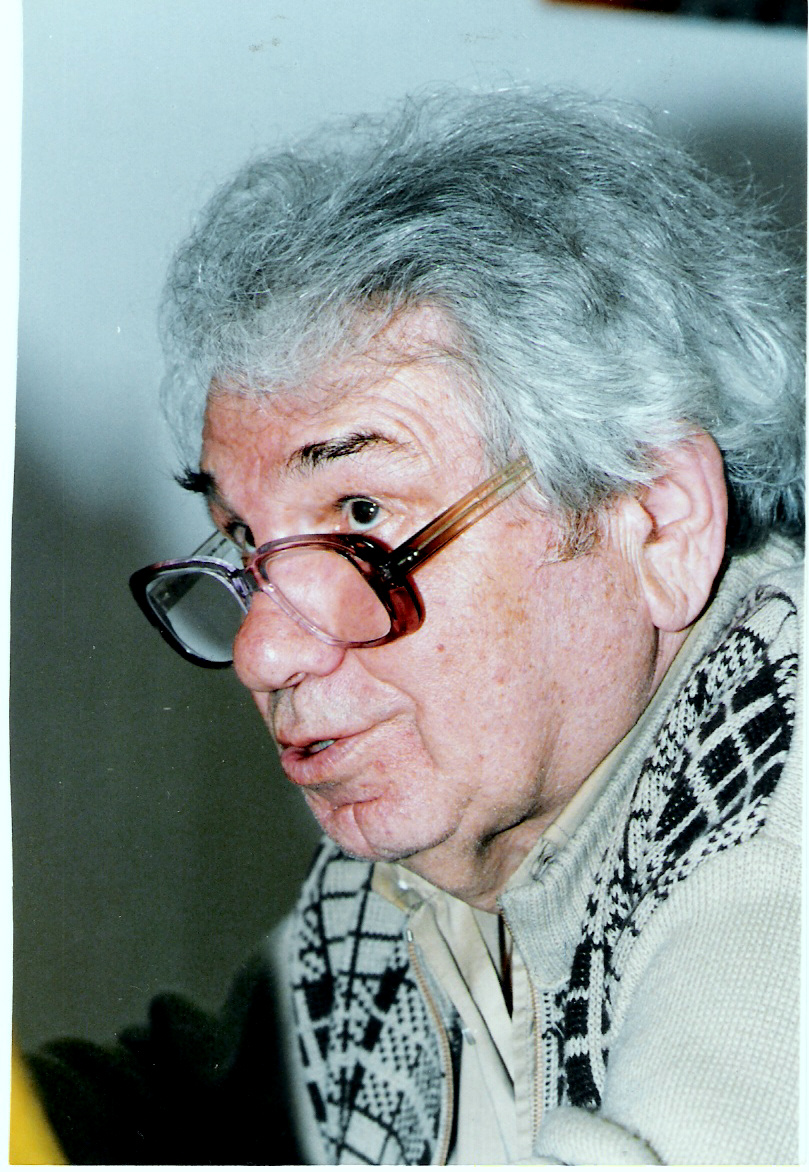
Michael Lev

Michael (Mishe) Lev (3 July 1917 - 23 May 2013) was a Yiddish language writer from Podolia.

== Life ==
Lev was born in Pohrebysche, Ukraine. He studied Yiddish language and literature in Moscow, and worked at a Yiddish publishing house, where his first publications appeared. During World War II Lev fought in the Soviet army, was taken prisoner, escaped, and joined the partisans. His wartime experiences became the main theme of his writings. He published 17 books in Yiddish, Russian and Hebrew. He died, aged 95, in Rehovot, Israel.
