= 2015 Tel Aviv bus stabbing attack =

Terrorist attack in Tel Aviv, Israel

2015 Tel Aviv attacks
- Location: Tel Aviv, Israel
- Date: 21 January 2015 c. 7:30 a.m.
- Attack type: Stabbing
- Weapon: Knife
- Deaths: 0
- Injuries: 12 (+1 attacker)
- Perpetrator: Hamza Matrouk
- Motive: Islamic extremism

During the morning rush hour of 21 January 2015, a Palestinian man from Tulkarm, West Bank boarded a bus in Tel Aviv and stabbed multiple people in a terrorist attack. After the bus he boarded had driven about 400 meters, the Palestinian attacked the driver, who fought back, before turning to other passengers and attacking them. The bus stopped, with the passengers fleeing, and the Palestinian attacked others too. Israeli police shot the terrorist in the foot and arrested him.

Twelve people were injured in the attack. The stabbing was the first violent incident in Tel Aviv since the November 2014 Killing of Sergeant Almog Shiloni.

The New York Times characterized this attack as representing a new category of threat to Israelis, "attacks carried out with seeming spontaneity by individuals acting without the instruction or backing of an organization."

== Attacks ==
At 7:30 am the assailant boarded a bus in Tel Aviv about 7:30 a.m. and rode two stops before attacking the driver with a knife. The driver, Herzl Biton, fought back, using pepper spray. The assailant attacked several passengers with the knife before they were able to open the doors of the bus and flee. The assailant pursued the fleeing passengers, stabbing one a second time, before he attempted to flee the scene.

As the assailant attempted to run away, bystanders who happened to be employees of the Israeli prison system gave chase, firing into the air. When the fleeing assailant did not stop, they shot him in the legs and captured him.

== Perpetrator ==
The stabbing attack was carried out by Hamza Muhammad Hassan Matrouk, a 23-year-old illegal immigrant worker from Al Jib. His parents are divorced and his father resides in Tulkarem.

Residents of Tulkarem who knew the suspect stated that he was not affiliated with any political party.

=== Trial and sentencing ===
Matrouk was a "lone wolf" who told the court that he had been motivated by watching radical Islamic programs on TV; he spoke of, "reaching paradise."

Noting that the suspect was unrepentant and showed no empathy for his victims, Judge Yaron Levi, of the Tel Aviv District Court sentenced Matrouk to 28 years in prison.

== Response ==
Hamas leaders praised the attack, calling it a, "natural reaction" on the part of an occupied people. Mousa Abu Marzook said, "there is no bigger terrorism than occupying people, stealing their lands, freedom and dignity."

The Popular Resistance Committees responded by asserting that, "Resistance attacks will not stop."

Israeli Prime Minister Benjamin Netanyahu denounced the attack as a direct result of incitement by the Palestinian Authority of president Mahmoud Abbas, "The attack in Tel Aviv is a direct result of poisonous incitement from the Palestinian Authority towards Jews and their state. This is the same terror which tried to harm us in Paris, Brussels and everywhere."

The hashtag #JeSuisCouteau ('I am a knife') and an Arabic translated by the newspaper Haaretz as "#TheKnivesRevolution" instantly spread across the internet in support of the knife attack on Israeli bus passengers. In addition, many people posted images of knives dripping with blood on social media and called for more attacks on Israelis.
