= Avi Beker =

Israeli writer, statesman, and professor (1951–2015)

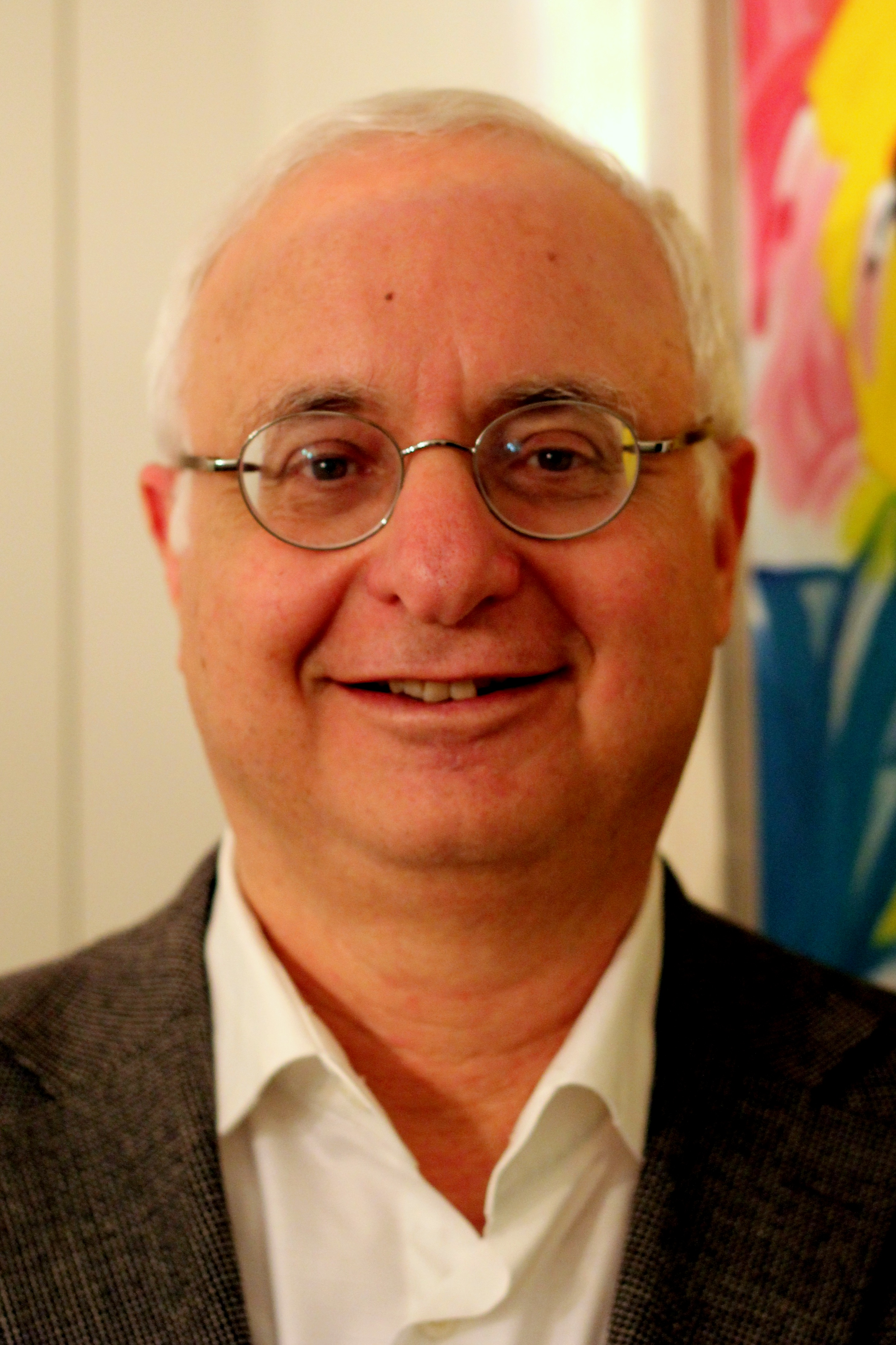
- Born: May 3, 1951; Tel Aviv, Israel
- Died: June 4, 2015 (aged 64)
- Education: Tel Aviv University; City University of New York
- Occupations: Secretary-general of the World Jewish Congress (2001–2003) International Relations Director of the World Jewish Congress (1998–2001); WJC Israel Executive Director (1985–2001) Diplomat of Israel to the United Nations (1977–1982)

Avi Beker (Hebrew: אבי בקר; May 3, 1951 – June 4, 2015) was an Israeli writer, statesman, and academic. Beker served as secretary-general of the World Jewish Congress from 4 October 2001 to 14 October 2003.

== Life ==
Born in Tel Aviv in 1951, Avi Beker served in the Israel Defense Forces and rose to the rank of captain. He graduated from Tel Aviv University and obtained a Ph.D. in political science from City University of New York. He was a member of the Permanent Mission of Israel to the United Nations (1977–1982) and a delegate to five United Nations General Assemblies and two special sessions of the General Assembly on disarmament, in 1978 and 1982 respectively.

== World Jewish Congress ==
Beker served as secretary-general of the World Jewish Congress from 2001 to 2003, following stints as the organization's international relations director (from 1998 to 2001) and as executive director of the WJC Israel office (from 1985 to 2001). He worked with several governments on ownership of property confiscated during the Nazi period. He served on the Claims Conference of Material Claims against Germany, the Norwegian Foundation for Jewish Heritage, the Dutch Jewish Fund, the Government Foundation for Restitution in the Czech Republic, and the Slovak Fund on Jewish Property.

After retiring from the WJC in 2003, Beker headed the Jewish Public Policy Project and the UN–Israel Institute at the Hartog School of Government and Policy. He also taught courses on diplomacy and international law at Tel Aviv University and at Georgetown University. He also served as a regular columnist for the Israeli newspapers Haaretz and Times of Israel.

Beker also was a member of the Board of Directors of the Jewish Diaspora Museum Beit Hatfutsot in Tel Aviv, of Yad Vashem in Jerusalem, of the Board of Trustees of Bar-Ilan University, of the WIZO College of Design and Management, and of the Africa Israel Hotels Corporation.

== Death ==
He died on 4 June 2015 after a long illness.

== Books ==
- Beker, Avi (2008-04-15). The Chosen: The History of an Idea, the Anatomy of an Obsession. Palgrave Macmillan. ISBN 978-0-230-60048-5.
- Beker, Avi (1985-05-21). Disarmament Without Order: The Politics of Disarmament at the United Nations. Bloomsbury Academic. ISBN 978-0-313-24362-2.
- Beker, Avi (1988). The United Nations and Israel: From Recognition to Reprehension. Lexington Books. ISBN 978-0-669-16652-1.
- Chief Editor, Jewish Communities of the World (Minnesota Lerner Publications, 1999).
- Editor, The Plunder of Jewish Property During the Holocaust – Confronting European History (England: Palgrave and New York: New York University Press, 2001). Contributing two essays.
- Co-editor with Yaacov Ro'i – Jewish Culture and Identity in the Soviet Union (New York: New York University Press 1989). In this book he contributed the essay "Superpower relations and Jewish Identity in the Soviet Union".
- Editor, Arms Control Without Glasnost – Building Security in the Middle East (Jerusalem: Israel Council On Foreign Relations, 1993), including his article "Denuclearization Without Glasnost".
- Co-editor, pictorial album, World Jewish Congress Jubilee 1936–1986 (Jerusalem, World Jewish Congress, 1986).
- Editor (proceedings) International Law and Foreign Policy (Jerusalem, Israel Council on Foreign Relations, 1991).
- Co-editor (reader) German Unification: A Jewish-Israeli Perspective (Jerusalem, Israel Council on Foreign Relations, 1991).
