= Menachem Yedid =

Israeli politician

- מנחם ידיד
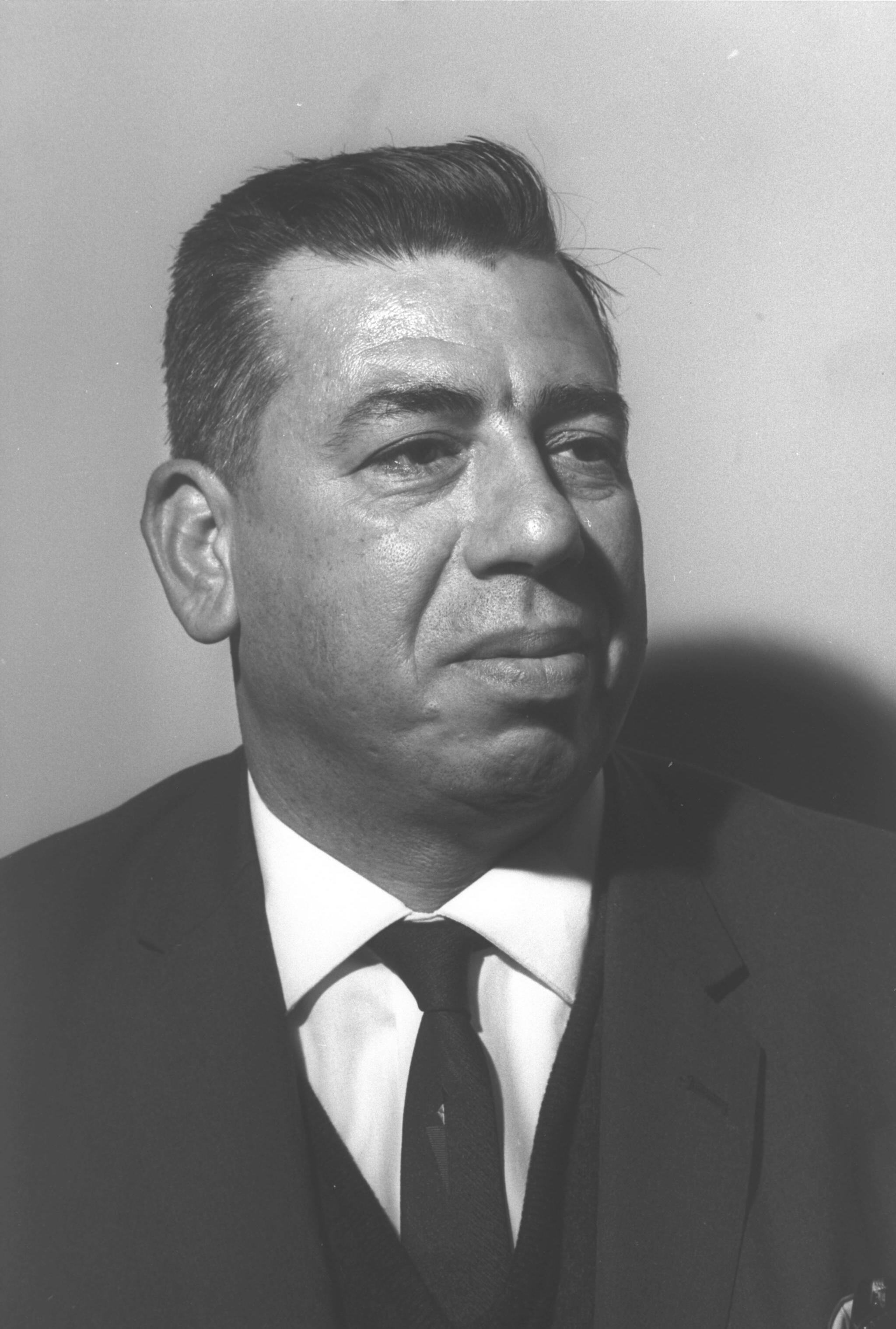
- Yedid in 1966

Faction represented in the Knesset
- 1965–1974: Gahal
- 1974–1977: Likud

Personal details
- Born: 15 January 1918; Aleppo, Syria
- Died: 5 May 2013 (aged 95)

Menachem Yedid (Hebrew: מנחם ידיד; 15 January 1918 – 5 May 2013) was an Israeli politician who served as a member of the Knesset for Gahal and Likud between 1965 and 1977.

== Biography ==
Born in Aleppo in Syria in 1918, Yedid was educated at a high school and yeshiva, before emigrating to Mandatory Palestine in 1935. In the same year he joined Betar. He later became a member of the Irgun, and was arrested by the British authorities in 1939 and again in 1946. He also was a member of the secretariat and executive committee of the National Labour Federation in Eretz-Israel.

In 1948 he was amongst the founders of Herut, and also established a branch of the party in the Hatikva Quarter in Tel Aviv, serving as its chairman. Between 1950 and 1965 he worked for Tel Aviv city council, before being elected to the Knesset on the Gahal list (an alliance of Herut and the Liberal Party) in the 1965 elections. He was re-elected in 1969 and 1973 (by which time Gahal had merged into Likud), before losing his seat in the 1977 elections.

Yedid also served as secretary of the Association of Aleppo and Syrian Émigrés.
