= Hitchhiking in Israel =

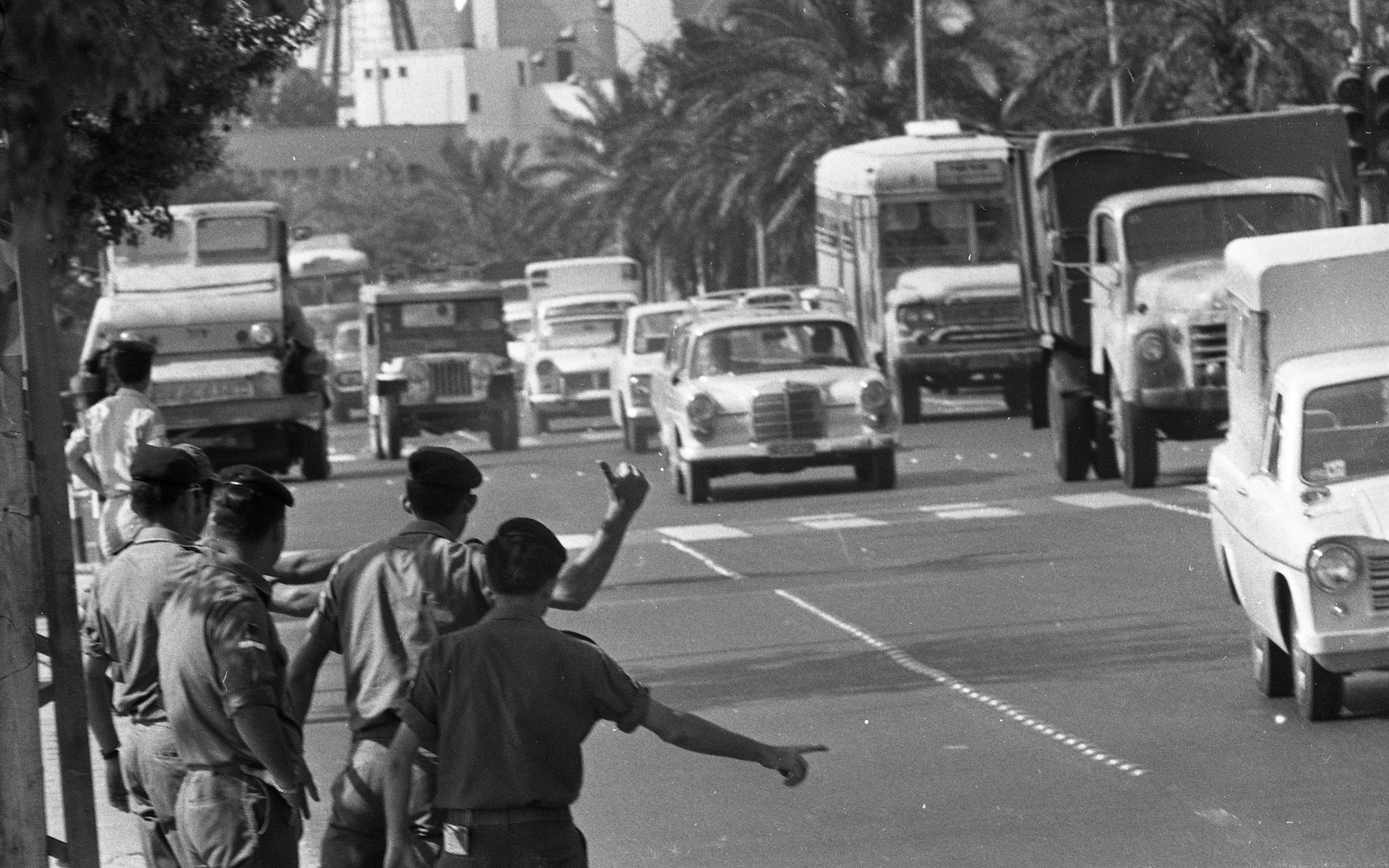
Israeli soldiers looking for a ride, 1969

Hitchhiking in Israel is the practice of hitching a ride in Israel, which was a popular form of transport in previous decades.

== History ==
Trempiyada is Hebrew (טרמפיאדה, derived from the German trampen) for a designated place at a junction of highways or main roads in Israel from which hitchhikers, called trempists, may solicit rides.

Historically, hitchhiking was perceived as a symbol of social solidarity and mutual trust, often described as a reflection of the nation being 'one big kibbutz.' Since the establishment of the state, trempiyadas served mainly IDF soldiers traveling to and from their bases. Due to an underdeveloped military transportation system at the time, soldiers relied heavily on hitchhiking. Israeli civilians, who deeply valued and cherished the IDF, routinely stopped at these stations to assist soldiers in reaching their destinations quickly.

However, during the 1980s and 1990s, a series of abductions and murders of soldiers occurred, including the killing of Avi Sasportas and Ilan Saadon in 1989 and the abduction of Nachshon Wachsman in 1994. In response to these security threats, the IDF imposed strict restrictions, eventually issuing a comprehensive ban on hitchhiking for soldiers across most of the country. Simultaneously, the military significantly improved its internal transportation infrastructure.

Nehemia Akiva Stern of the University of Pittsburgh claimed that hitchhiking was mainly practiced by religious Zionist youth within the West Bank and described it as "a ritual of sacred travel."

In 2014, three Israeli teenagers were abducted whilst hitchhiking and found deceased soon after. Following the event, there was increased hostilities between Jewish and Arab communities. Critics blame the event on the "cavalier" attitude of young Israelis hitchhikers. Further, some journalists have observed that some Israelis insist on hitchhiking as a demonstration of their freedom and right to travel. Despite tensions and events of violence, many insist on hitchhiking and affirm its institutional role in Israeli society.

== See also ==
- Liftershalte
- Slugging
