= Abduction and killing of Nissim Toledano =

1992 abduction and murder of an Israeli border policeman by Palestinian Hamas militants

- Part of the Israeli–Palestinian conflict
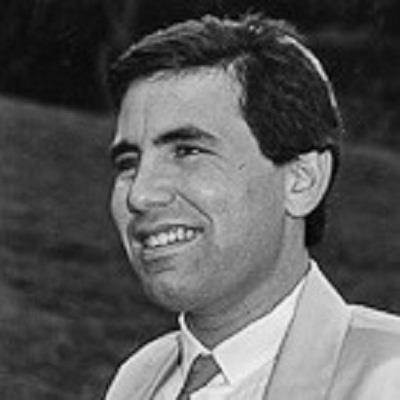
- Toledano
- Native name: חטיפת נסים טולדנו ורציחתו
- Location: Lod, Israel
- Date: 13 December 1992; 33 years ago c. 4:30 am (UTC+2)
- Attack type: Abduction and killing
- Deaths: 1 Israeli soldier (Nissim Toledano)
- Perpetrator: Hamas
- No. of participants: 4

On 13 December 1992, Hamas militants abducted Israeli Border Police Senior Sergeant Nissim Toledano in Lod, Israel, demanding the release of their leader, Sheikh Ahmed Yassin. The militants' ultimatum went unfulfilled, and Toledano was killed two days later. In response, Israeli authorities launched mass arrests of Palestinian militants and deported hundreds of Hamas and Palestinian Islamic Jihad members to southern Lebanon. The kidnappers were later captured, tried, and sentenced to life imprisonment. One of them, Musa al-Akari, was eventually released in the 2011 Gilad Shalit prisoner exchange. Another key perpetrator, Mahmoud Issa, was released in October 2025 as part of a ceasefire agreement during the Gaza war.

== Background ==
In 1987, during the First Intifada, Hamas carried out its first attack against Israel, abducting and killing two Israeli soldiers. In response, the Israel Defense Forces arrested Hamas founder Sheikh Ahmed Yassin, who was subsequently sentenced to life in prison for masterminding terrorist attacks. Following Yassin's imprisonment, Hamas began planning to capture an Israeli soldier to use as leverage in a prisoner exchange for his release.

== Capture and killing ==
At approximately 4:30 am on 13 December 1992, a squad of Hamas militants kidnapped 29-year-old Israeli Border Police Senior Sergeant Nissim Toledano in Lod as he was walking from his home to his administrative job.

That same day, Hamas issued an ultimatum demanding the release of Sheikh Ahmed Yassin by 9:00 pm in exchange for Toledano, threatening to kill him if their demand was not met. Israel refused to negotiate until it received proof that Toledano was alive and unharmed.

Two days later, on 15 December, Toledano's body was discovered near the Israeli settlement of Kfar Adumim in the West Bank. He was found bound and had been stabbed. A pathological examination concluded that he had been murdered two to six hours after the ultimatum expired. The findings also indicated that the strangulation and stabbing occurred at a location different from where the body was found.

== Israel's response ==
In response to the killing, Israel launched a massive manhunt in the Gaza Strip and the West Bank, arresting approximately 1,200 Palestinian fundamentalists, mostly from Hamas and the Islamic Jihad. Those detained included 22 members of the Izz al-Din al Qassam Brigades. In an unprecedented move intended to cripple Hamas's infrastructure, the Israeli government decided to expel hundreds of Palestinian militants to Lebanon for a period of two years.

On 17 December 1992, Israel expelled 415 prominent Hamas and Islamic Jihad figures to Marj al-Zohour in southern Lebanon, beyond the Israeli Security Zone. Among the more prominent deportees were Mahmoud al-Zahar, Abd al-Aziz Rantisi, Ismail Haniyeh, Said Siam, Izz El-Deen Sheikh Khalil, Abbedallah Qawasameh, Aziz Duwaik, and Nayef Rajoub.

The deportation received widespread media coverage, prompting Lebanese authorities to block the deportees' entry. This forced them to remain in a desolate buffer zone between Israeli and Lebanese army checkpoints, where they established a tent camp that drew significant international media attention.

A few months after the event, the IDF arrested Toledano's kidnappers and killers: Mahmoud Issa, Majid Abu Qatish, Mahmoud Atwan, and Musa al-Akari. They were tried, convicted, and sentenced to life imprisonment. Al-Akari received three consecutive life sentences for his role in the murder. Mahmoud Issa was held in solitary confinement for ten years between 2002 and 2012. By the time he was removed from solitary confinement, he had spent more time in isolation and had been denied family visits longer than any other Palestinian prisoner.

In February 1993, Israel shortened the expulsion period to one year. Most of the deportees returned to the West Bank and the Gaza Strip after their term of exile ended.

== Later developments ==
Musa al-Akari was released in 2011 as part of the Gilad Shalit prisoner exchange. In 2014, his brother, Ibrahim al-Akari—a Hamas operative—drove a van into a crowd of Israelis in Jerusalem, killing one person and wounding 14 others. By 2024, Musa al-Akari, then a senior Hamas official based in Turkey, was sanctioned by the United States for his involvement in facilitating the transfer of funds from Turkey to Hamas operations in Gaza and the West Bank.

Mahmoud Issa, another key perpetrator of Toledano's murder, was released in October 2025 as part of a prisoner exchange during the Gaza war.

== See also ==
- 2014 kidnapping and murder of Israeli teenagers, by Hamas
- Kidnapping and murder of Yaron Chen, by Hamas
- Kidnapping and murder of Avi Sasportas and Ilan Saadon, by Hamas
- Kidnapping and murder of Nachshon Wachsman, by Hamas
