= 2014 kidnapping and murders of Israeli teenagers =

Palestinian attack on three Israeli teenagers

Coordinates: 31.6547°N 35.1223°E

2014 kidnapping and murder of Israeli teenagers
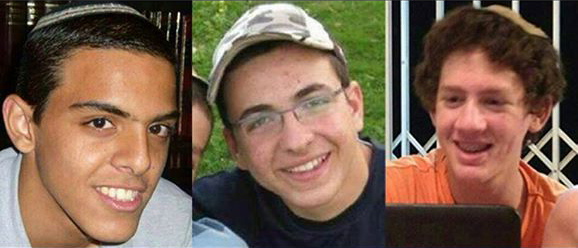
- Eyal Yifrach, Gilad Shaar, Naftali Fraenkel
- Date: 12 June 2014
- Time: c. 22:00 IDT (UTC+03:00)
- Location: Gush Etzion, West Bank
- Outcome: The three kidnapped teenagers were murdered and their bodies found on 30 June.
- Deaths: Naftali Fraenkel, 16, from Nof Ayalon; Gilad Shaer, 16, from Talmon; Eyal Yifrah, 19, from El'ad
- Suspects: 2 Hamas members from Hebron: Marwan Qawasmeh (29) and Amar Abu-Isa/Amer Abu Aysha (32)

The 2014 Gush Etzion kidnapping and murder refers to the abduction and killing of three Israeli teenagers in the West Bank during June 2014. The victims, Eyal Yifrach, Gilad Shaer, and Naftali Fraenkel, were Israeli students aged 16 and 19. On the evening of 12 June 2014, the three teenagers were hitchhiking in the Alon Shvut settlement in Gush Etzion, in the West Bank when they were abducted.

The Israel Defense Forces immediately initiated Operation Brother's Keeper (Hebrew: מבצע שובו אחים, romanized: Mivtza Shuvu Ahim) in search of the three teenagers. On 30 June, their bodies were found in a shallow grave near the town of Halhul. Israeli authorities accused two members of the Palestinian militant group Hamas, Marwan Qawasmeh and Amer Abu Aisha, of carrying out the abduction and murder. As part of the operation, Israel arrested around 350 Palestinians, including nearly all of Hamas' West Bank leaders. The suspects were killed during a standoff with Israeli security forces on 23 September 2014, leading to the end of the operation.

The incident gained significant international attention and escalated tensions between Israelis and Palestinians, leading to an increase in violence and retaliatory actions and eventually triggering the 2014 Gaza War.

== Background ==
2013 was a calm period with the November 2012 ceasefire being largely respected, despite 50 rockets fired by Palestinians and 10 airstrikes by Israel. According to the Palestinian Centere for Human Rights (PCHR) 44 Palestinians were killed and over 100 injured, while the Israeli Security Agency reported six Israeli fatalities (all but one from the West Bank) and 44 injuries. The first half of 2014 saw an increase in tension manifested by a higher rate of injuries. Among Palestinians there were 43 fatalities in the first half of the year plus 1860 injuries. Tension was also increased by Israel's opposition to the formation of a Hamas-Fatah unity government, with threats of sanctions and the burgeoning issue of prisoners and the violation of the Shalit agreement Mutual attacks on each other by Israel and Gaza continued, as did the Israeli blockade of Gaza.

Mainstream western media ascribe the initiation of the major 2014 conflict to the kidnapping of the three Israeli teenagers. Some news analysts believe that earlier clashes also played a role in the chain of events, such as 15 May, when Israeli forces shot and killed two Palestinian teenagers during a protest near Beitunia as part of the Nakba Day commemorations; an autopsy report published on 9 June proved the death of one of them to be due to "live fire," i.e. not "rubber bullets."

The Israeli Foreign Ministry website emphasized rocket fire from Gaza as being the reason for the IDF mission into Gaza.

== Victims ==
Eyal Yifrach, 19, lived in El'ad, Naftali Fraenkel (also spelled Frenkel), 16, was a dual Israeli-American citizen and lived in Nof Ayalon. Gilad Shaer was a resident of the Israeli settlement of Talmon. Eyal Yifrah was a student at the Shavei Hevron Yeshiva on King David Street in Hebron. The other two were students of the Mekor Chaim yeshiva at Kfar Etzion in the West Bank's Area C under full Israeli administration.

== Suspects ==
=== Initial suspected perpetrators ===
Israeli Prime Minister Benjamin Netanyahu stated that Hamas killed the teenagers. But opinions were divided within Israel's security services as to whether or not the two suspects had direct ties to Hamas. On 26 June, the Israel Security Agency identified two Hamas members as key suspects in the kidnapping, whom Palestinian police noted, had gone missing since the night of the kidnapping. High-ranking members of Hamas denied that the group had any involvement or foreknowledge of the incident. The two named suspects hail from the Qawasameh clan, notorious for consistently acting against Hamas's policies. Hamas political chief Khaled Mashal said he could neither confirm nor deny the kidnapping of the three Israelis, and he congratulated the abductors, because "our prisoners must be freed from the prisons of the occupation."

Initially a number of groups, some previously unknown, claimed responsibility for the kidnappings: The Al-Aqsa Martyrs' Brigades (subsequently denied); a West Bank Branch of Islamic State in Iraq and the Levant, Brigades of Global Jihad, Ahrar ar-Khalil (Liberators Battalion of Hebron), and Regiments of Hezbollah. It was not clear how true their claims were, and the middle three were not considered credible.

=== Suspects arrested ===
After the kidnap of the Israeli teens, Israel commenced Operation Brother's Keeper in the West Bank. Israel killed 9 Palestinians and raided 1300 properties including commercial and residential buildings. 800 Palestinians were arrested without immediate charge or trial. On 5 August 2014 Israel announced that Israeli security forces arrested Hussam Kawasme, in Shuafat, in connection with the murders. During interrogation, Kawasme admitted to being the mastermind behind the attack, in addition to securing the funding from Hamas. Kawasme stated that after the boys were killed, Marwan Kawasme and Amer Abu Aysha drove to his house, where the three proceeded to bury the victims in Halhoul, the land Kawasme purchased only a few weeks prior.

By the time of his arrest, Kaswasme had shaved his beard and received a fake passport, in what was believed to be part of a plan to escape to Jordan.

Officials stated that additional people arrested in connection with the murders were still being held, but no names were initially released.

On 20 August, Hamas member Saleh al-Arouri, who lived in Turkey, claimed Hamas's involvement in the abduction and murder. He continued to describe the perpetrators as heroic. Hugh Lovatt of the European Council on Foreign Relations labeled al-Arouri's claim was "suspicious", saying it might have reflected a desire to assert his relevance within the Hamas leadership or, alternatively, was accurate, reflecting a power struggle within Hamas itself. On 21 August Hamas leader Khaled Mashal congratulated the kidnapping, but claimed Hamas leadership had no prior knowledge of the abductions and murders and had learned about them through the Israeli military.

The following day, NGO Shurat HaDin contacted US Attorney General Eric Holder to request extradition of al-Arouri. Although Turkey and Israel do not have an extradition agreement, the US and Turkey do, which it can use to extradite those who commit terrorist acts against US citizens.

=== Suspects killed ===
The two suspects, Marwan Kawasme and Amar Abu Aysha, were staying in a house in Hebron, when IDF soldiers and Israeli counter-terrorism Yamam members surrounded the building at dawn on 23 September, in an attempt to arrest the suspects. Israeli forces opened fire on the building and reportedly called on the two suspects to come out. With no response the Israeli force began using a bulldozer to bring down the building. According to Israeli forces, one of the suspects partially rose out of a hole and began firing a rifle, whereupon Israeli forces shot him. After this suspect fell back into the home, likely dead, Israeli forces again opened fire on the house, utilizing grenades and other explosives this time, after which both men were confirmed deceased.

Both Hebron governor Kamel Hmeid and Hamas spokesman Salah Bardawil described the suspects as martyrs, with the latter belatedly insinuating that Hamas had in fact been responsible for the kidnap and murder of the three Israeli teens. Hamas leader Khaled Mashal also called the suspects "martyrs" and "heroes."

=== Investigation conclusion ===
The investigation concluded that the kidnapping operation's costs ran to NIS220,000, a sum procured by Hossam Hassan Kawasmeh (40), with the assistance of his brother, Mahmoud, who was exiled to the Gaza Strip in the Gilad Shalit exchange in November 2011, to purchase the two vehicles and weaponry. The cars were purchased from Nuh Abu-Eisha, and the weapons from Hamas operative Adnan Mahmad Izzat Zru (34), both Hebronites. Hossam Kawasmeh's attempt to escape to Jordan, thwarted when he was arrested in the Shuafat refugee camp on 11 July, was assisted by his relatives Hisham Kawasmeh (45) and Jamil Kawasmeh (38), as well as Hassan Kawasmeh (45), a Hamas militant. Two other Hebronites, Ahmad Ibrahim Mahmad Kawasmeh (64) and his brother, senior Hamas operative Arafat Ibrahim Mahmad Kawasmeh (50), were involved in helping the perpetrators go into hiding, the latter concealing them on his property. On 6 January 2015, Hussam Qawasmeh was sentenced to three life terms in prison for the murders, along with being assessed a compensation payment of $63,000 to the victims' families.

== Sequence of events ==
=== Prelude ===
According to Israeli investigations, the seizure and killing of the three was organized by Hussam Qawasmeh, who had received $39,000 from his brother Mahmoud in Gaza, via a go-between still at large. The money financed the purchase of three M-16 rifles, a jeep, and the Israeli car, which was bought from a used-car dealer in Hebron after it was stolen from the settlement of Tzur Hadassah. Altogether, he met with Marwan five or six times before the kidnapping. The plan was to conceal one kidnapped Israeli in Marwan Qawasme's barbershop in Hebron, then transfer him to Marwan's aunt's vacant house. A first attempt on 10 June failed to find any hitchhikers. There was no intention to release the boys: from the outset the plan, considered amateurish and not professional, envisaged murdering the captives. The plot of land where they were buried had been purchased to that end some time earlier, and a refuge to escape detection had been prepared in an old house near Tufah where the two suspects hid in a disused cesspit for five days.

=== Week 1 (12–19 June) ===
Netanyahu asserted that the attack originated from PA-controlled areas, and criticized the Fatah-Hamas pact.

In the first week, Israel added a further three to the six combat brigades already present in the West Bank. Close to 40 battalions were engaged in rounding up suspects, notably the Paratroopers' 35th Division and the Kfir's 900th Division. Other specialized groups, such as the Duvdevan Unit, the Egoz Reconnaissance Unit and the Airborne Rescue And Evacuation Unit 669 supplement the search force. Skylark mini UAV drones were deployed, and the Yahalom combat engineering unit conducted tunnel searches. Fifty Bedouin IDF trackers were also used.

==== Day 1 ====
Late into the night of Thursday, 12 June, teenagers Yifrach, Fraenkel, and Shaer were waiting at Geva'ot Intersection, west of the settlement of Alon Shvut in the Etzion Bloc south of Jerusalem, soon after 22:15, looking to catch a ride heading west on Route 367 toward Beit Shemesh and from there to locations in central Israel where each of them lived. The kidnappers intended to kidnap one Israeli. Apparently Yifrach, after accepting a ride, waved to the other two to join him. The Palestinians, afraid of giving their identity away if they spoke Hebrew, didn't dare object. After the car veered off from the declared direction of Ashkelon, the three realized they had been kidnapped. Shaer then telephoned the police at 22:25, whispering, "I've been kidnapped." Eight attempts were made to page the caller's cellphone, without checking its ownership, and his whispered remark was taken to be one of a number of pranks made that night. No check was made to find out the phone's owner, nor whether he was missing. Within days, Israeli investigators, though lacking conclusive proof, strongly suspected the teenagers had been killed, and, if so, knew where the victims' bodies would probably have been dumped. Subsequent analysis of the tape revealed what the police failed to realize at the time, that the murders had occurred while the hotline operator had been listening.

Four and a half hours passed before Shaer's family finally phoned the Talmon security coordinator at 3:10 am to inform him their son Gil-Ad had not returned home. Only then did the security establishment take the case seriously, and Shin Bet and the IDF were alerted by the police. According to the Palestinian Ma'an News Agency, the army succeeded in tracing the call to the Sanjar region, the last cellphone signal being made at 23:20 in the Hebron area, when Fraenkel's and Shaer's cellphones had been switched off. Meanwhile, at 1 a.m. on Friday morning, Marwan knocked on Hussam's door and said, "I've murdered three Jews."

A gag order regarding the abduction was immediately placed on Israeli news services. The presumed identities of the kidnappers, acolytes of senior Hamas members, were known almost from the beginning to everyone in Hebron, but kept from the Israeli public; in lieu of concrete details, rumours proliferated. Controversy soon raged in Israel over the police delay in reporting the call. At 11:00 on 13 June, a "Hannibal" alert (meaning 'kidnapping') was issued.

Based on cellphone and other data, Israeli investigators deduced that the kidnappers' car had stopped near Beit Kahil, west of Halhul, for 28 minutes. According to Palestinian security sources, a Hyundai i35, with seating for 5, with Israeli license plates, was torched on the night of 12 June, and subsequently found by Palestinian police 2 kilometres (1.2 mi) from the village of Beit Einun near Hebron. This vehicle was believed to be connected to the abduction. Suspicion arose that the use of the car displaying Israeli license plates was a trick to lull the hitchhikers into believing the vehicle was driven by Israelis. Israeli authorities had placed the emergency call recording under a gag order, but it was leaked to the public, after which the gag order was partially lifted. It then emerged that after Gilad Shaer's whispered message "They kidnapped me," the taped emergency call also recorded a cry ("heads down!"), sounds of shouting, a volley of automatic fire, a weak voice sighing "Ai," silence, another volley of automatic fire and then singing. The burnt car discovered that morning yielded evidence of numerous blood-stains. Israeli police assumed correctly that bodies must have been buried in that vicinity. What they did not know was that the bodies had been taken from the provisional burial site and reburied 3 kilometres (1.9 mi) beyond the radius of research. Notwithstanding this, the Israeli authorities began to broadcast the message that the boys were abducted, not that they had been murdered.

==== Days 2–3 ====
On 14–15 June, the Hebron and South Hebron Hills areas were the focus of investigations by a large number of troops. Soldiers numbering 2,500 together with security agents, police, and special forces, engaged in a manhunt, scouring numerous villages, including Beit Ummar, Beit Einun, Halhul, Dura, as-Samu, Tarqumiyah, Beit Kahil, Yatta, Taffuh, and Tapuah in what the IDF termed 'Operation Shuvu Achim (Return, Brothers/Bring Back Our Brothers),' and referred to in English as 'Brother's Keeper'. An anonymous "security source" claimed that little resistance was encountered because the local populations have become accustomed in recent years to regular night raids by the IDF. The sound of rubber-coated bullets and tear-gas canisters were heard.

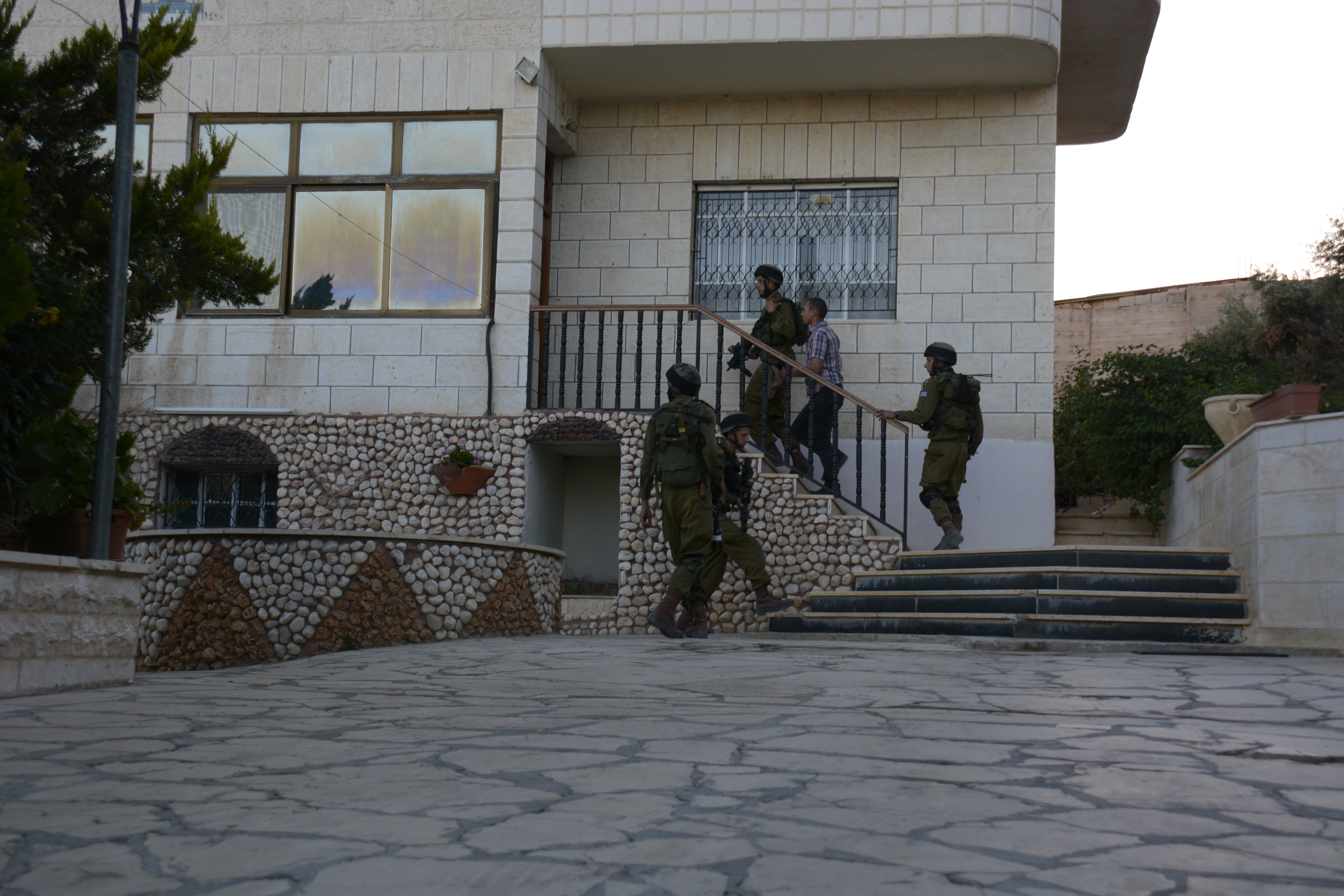
IDF troops entering a building to search on 15 June.

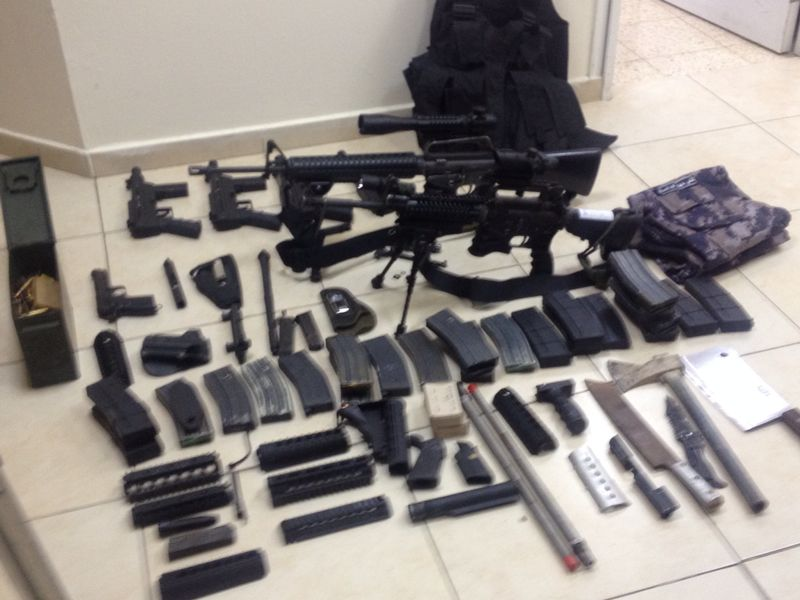
Weapons found during Operation Brother's Keeper in Nablus

Over the weekend, Israeli security forces also arrested around 80 Palestinians, among them senior members of Hamas, accused of being connected to the kidnapping, in a sweep that rounded up former government leaders, clerics, university lecturers, and militants of both Hamas and Islamic Jihad across the West Bank. In Hebron's Ein Deir Baha neighborhood Israeli forces broke down a door, apparently by firing a missile, after surrounding the house of Akram al-Qawasami. He, his 8-year-old son Muhammad and younger daughter Sujoud were injured by shrapnel, and two Hamas operatives, among them Zaid Akram al-Qawasami, were arrested inside. The military also fully closed the Hebron area and Gaza crossings, only allowing passage for humanitarian cases.

On Sunday, Netanyahu said what he had only hinted at previously, that Israel "knew for a fact" that the abduction had been carried out by Hamas, a position the IDF had avoided explicitly stating. He did, however, not provide any evidence. Security officials remained more cautious, tending to accept the probability that a Hebronite Hamas cell was involved, but uncertain whether it was a local initiative to secure prisoner releases or an operation approved by the Hamas leadership in Gaza. A remark by Moshe Ya'alon about the "very heavy price" Hamas leaders might pay was interpreted by one journalist as hinting Israel might be mulling the option of resuming its campaign of targeted killings, this time against the Hamas leadership. Israel's Deputy Minister of Defense, Danny Danon, threatened "possible actions" in Gaza and Ramallah.

==== Day 4 ====
Overnight on 16 June, the IDF clashed with Palestinians in Jenin, where they ransacked the offices of Mustafa Barghouti's Palestinian National Initiative and confiscated computers. 400 IDF soldiers raided the Jalazone refugee camp near Ramallah, killing 20 year old Ahmad Arafat Samada (Ahmad Sabarin) with a gunshot wound in the chest. A dragnet rounded up a further 50 people, bringing the total of Palestinians detained to 150. Many arrests, including the former speaker of the Palestinian Legislative Council Aziz Duwaik, 66, were part of what IDF Chief of Staff Benny Gantz described as an extensive operation, and were not linked to the search for the youths, but were part of a crackdown to apply pressure on Hamas. Netanyahu's approach was interpreted by some opponents as aimed at driving a wedge between Fatah and Hamas in order to break up the reconciliation between the two negotiated in April 2014. Palestinian Authority sources noted that Hamas, in the unity negotiations, had agreed to desist from attacks and bloodshed, and if its involvement in the kidnappings was proven, it would be a breach of the agreement that would render the reconciliation null and void, a point repeated later in the week by the Palestinian Foreign Minister.

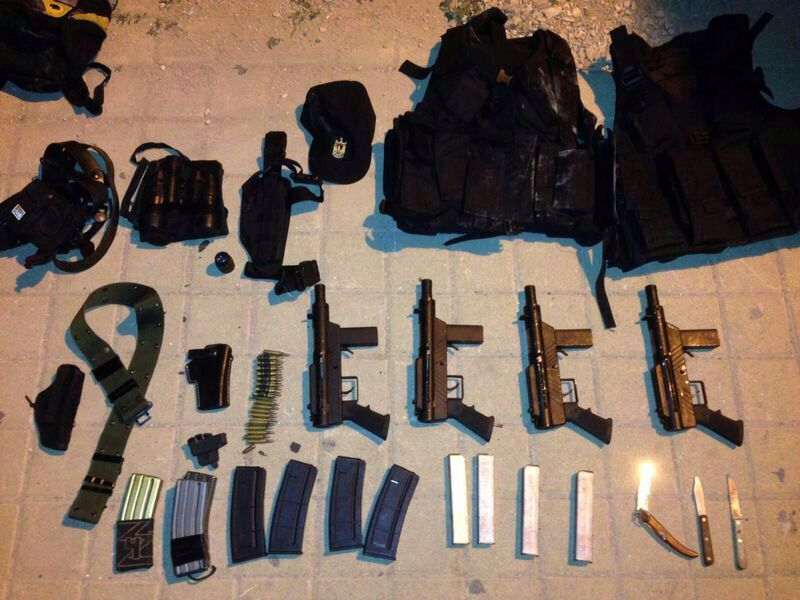
Weapons found in Nablus during Operation Brother's Keeper on the night of 16 June

==== Day 5 ====
Overnight 16–17 June, the IDF arrested more than 200 Palestinians. Anything linked to Hamas was being targeted, an official source said. The IDF shifted its attentions north, and deployed 1,000 soldiers from the Nahal Brigade for operations around Nablus. In particular the Balata refugee camp and the village of Awarta were scoured in what a spokesman called '"cleaning house" in the "terror capital of Nablus"', and a further 41 Palestinians were detained, among them the manager of the Hamas-run television channel Al-Aqsa TV, bringing the number of arrests to 200. Israeli soldiers confiscated a large cache of weapons and uncovered a weapons manufacturing lab in Nablus.

Conflicting reports emerged regarding Israel's collaboration with both the PNA and other regional governments. Israel's Coordinator of Government Activities in the Territories, Yoav Mordechai, denied on 16 June that Israel coordinated the search with Palestinian or Egyptian authorities. However, Israel military intelligence confirmed that Israel was working closely with both the PA authorities and Egypt. Egyptian sources stated the same day that Israel had requested their assistance, and that President Abdel Fattah el-Sisi had issued directives to his security services to undertake negotiations with all parties. On 17 June, Israel defence sources said PNA assistance had been "very professional."

==== Day 6 ====
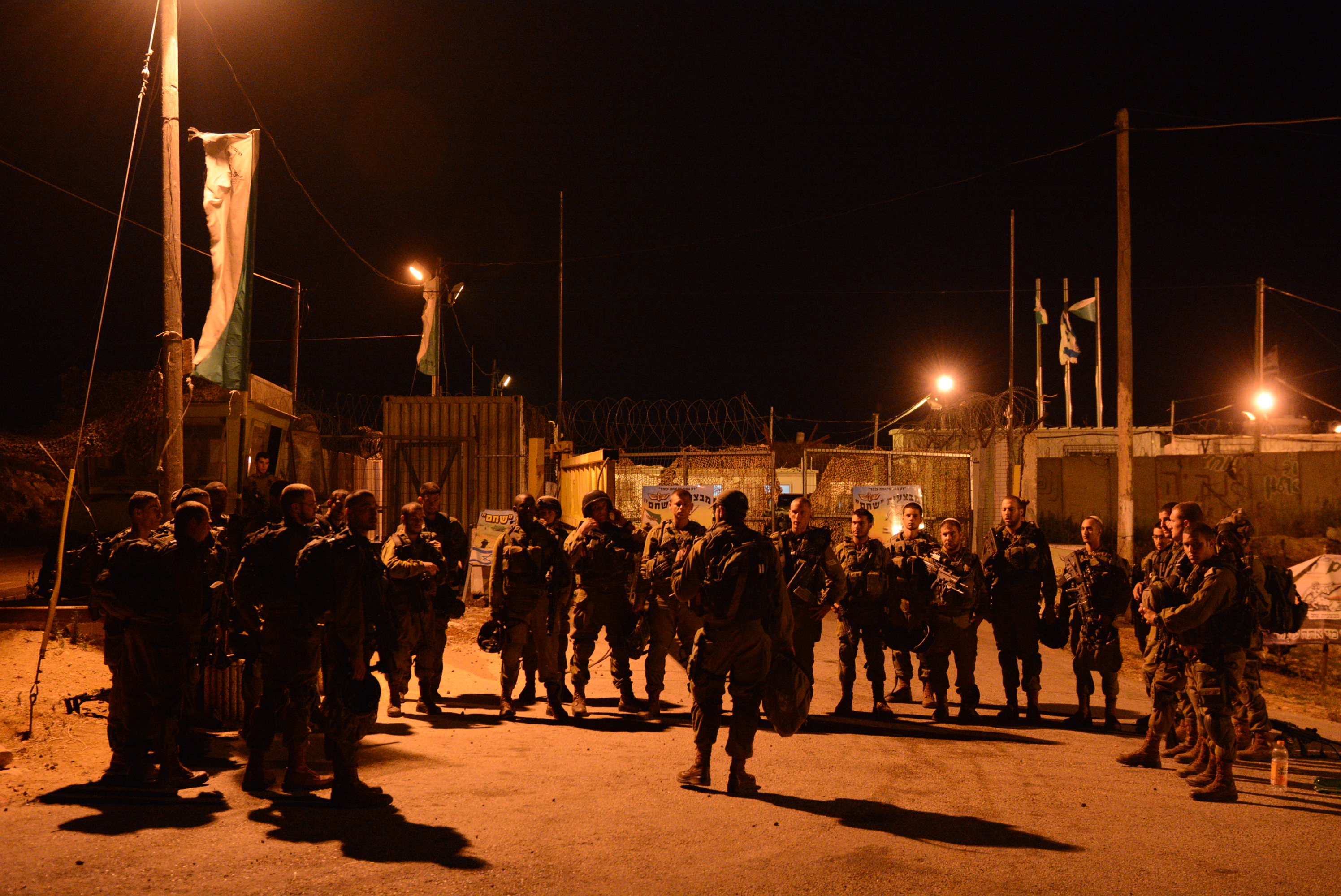
IDF troops in the West Bank on the night of 18 June.

On the night of 18 June, Israel seized 64 more Palestinians, of whom 51 were Hamas members who had been previously arrested but released in the Gilad Shalit exchange in 2011, bringing to 240 the number of arrests. In six days, government sources announced, they had searched 800 structures, including the Al-Aqsa radio station in Ramallah and the Hebron-based TransMedia communications company, both linked to Hamas. Operations had taken place in Hebron, Jenin, Nablus, Yatta, Taffuh, Dura, Beit Kahil, East Jerusalem, Idhna, Surif, Beit Ula, Beit Awwa, Deir Sharaf, Salfit, Audla, Tell, Beit Furik and Qabatiya. The overnight operations also secured the defenses of Israeli settlements. In the process, 300,000 Palestinians were left under curfew, and 600,000 in the area had their movements restricted, while Hebronites with permission to work in Israel, an estimated 20,000, were denied entrance into Israel, disrupting their livelihood. According to an IDF spokesman, Palestinians preparing for the Ramadan holiday had "taken a hit." Home Front Defense Minister Gilad Erdan also stated that Israel had identified the Hamas cell responsible for the kidnapping.

==== Day 7 ====
Overnight on 19 June, troops raided the Bir Zeit University's student union searching for incriminating evidence, finding promotional material for Hamas. The Prime Minister declared at a press conference: "We know more today than we did a few days ago." The IDF arrested 25 wanted Palestinians in the West Bank, and searched 200 homes. Nine more raids were launched against Hamas social services (Dawah) centers. Moshe Ya'alon outlawed West Bank activities of the British Muslim charity, Islamic Relief Worldwide (IRW) because some of its offices employed Hamas members. In East Jerusalem, a social centre operated from a Beit Safafa mosque in Beit Safafa village, and a Sur Baher charity were also closed down. By night's end, 49 Palestinians had been arrested. One of the refugee camp detainees alleged that soldiers had stolen $580 from his wallet.

=== Week 2 (20–26 June) ===
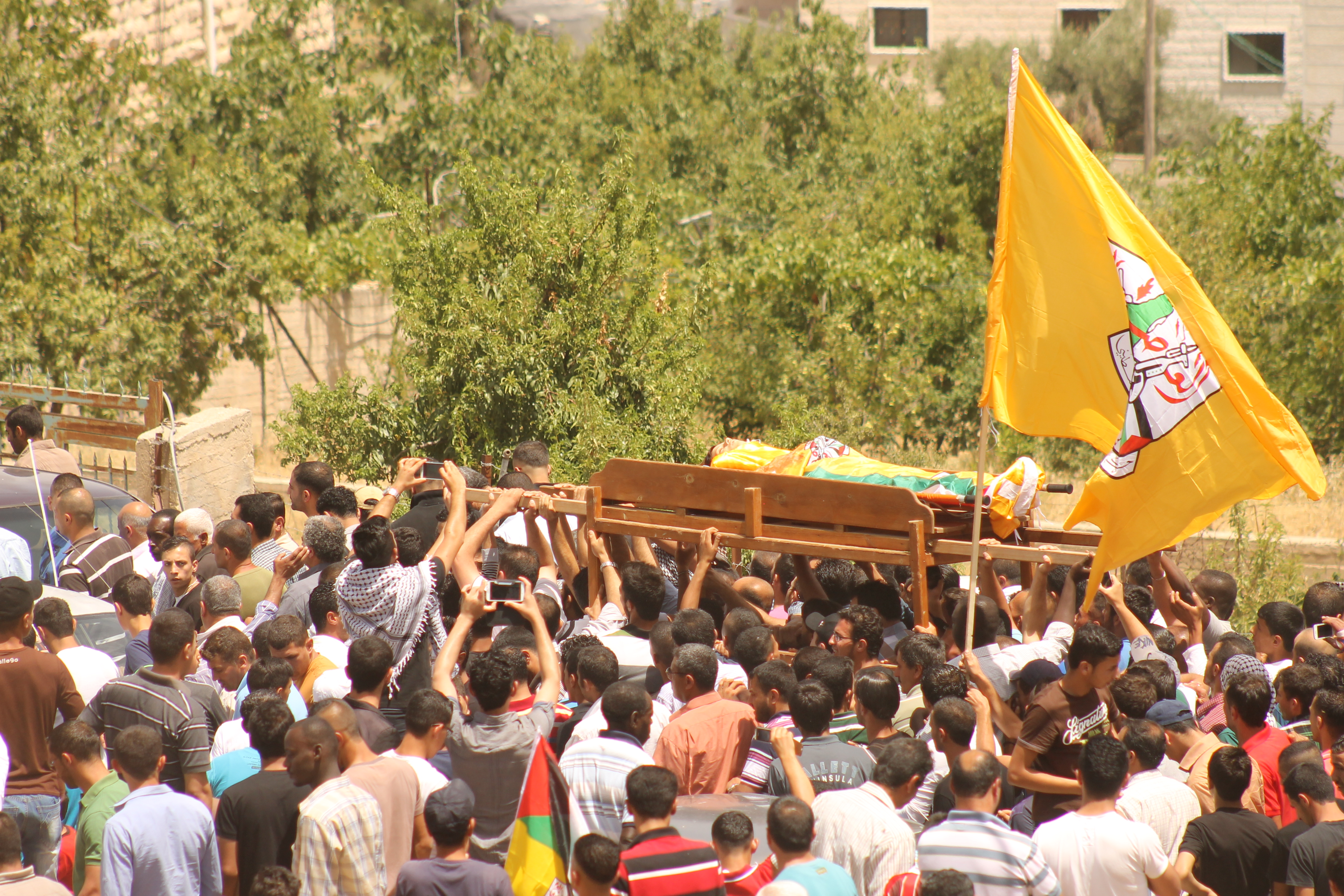
The funeral of 15-year-old Mohammed Dudeen, killed by the IDF in Dura during operation Brother's Keeper, June 2014

==== Day 8 ====
Throughout the week, the arrest of Hamas leaders went quietly as they acceded to their detention, but by Friday, 20 June, sporadic popular resistance began to emerge. Three Palestinians were wounded in a raid on Qalandiya refugee camp, near Jerusalem, while another five were wounded in clashes at the Dheisheh refugee camp by Bethlehem, whose Ibdaa cultural center was wrecked, cheques and money from its safe, together with five computers, confiscated. Four of the victims were reportedly run over by an Israeli jeep. Also on 20 June, Israeli soldiers near the Qalandiya checkpoint in Ramallah fired live rounds at a group of Palestinians who had thrown homemade grenades at them. Mustafa Hosni Aslan, 22, received a gunshot wound to the head, and died on 25 June. Live fire was used according to the IDF in response to Molotov cocktails, pipe bombs, one makeshift grenade, firecrackers, and stones being thrown at soldiers at the camps. In Dura's Haninia neighbourhood, after a night-long raid, involving many clashes with local youths, to detain a person Israelis consider to be a terrorist, as troops were withdrawing, eyewitness testimonies reported that a retreating Israeli soldier fired six shots and killed 15-year-old Mohammed Dudeen. Twenty-five more Palestinians were arrested at Dura and Dheisheh, bringing the number of detainees to 320, of which 240 are considered Hamas operatives. The number of sites searched mounted to 1,150, of which 1,000 buildings were damaged, the figure including over 750 homes. According to Palestinian Foreign Minister Riyad al-Malki Israel had destroyed 150 homes by week's end. In another dawn raid on the Dean's Office and Student Union of the Arab American University in Jenin papers were seized, and Amir Saadi, 17, was shot in the shoulder. The villages of Arraba, Al-Louz, and Artas were also raided.

Riyad al-Malki demanded Israel produce evidence that Hamas was culpable, stating that Netanyahu cannot "keep blaming one side without showing evidence." He said Israel's massive military sweeps were unacceptable, with 300 Palestinians taken in exchange for three Israeli kids, but the Palestinian authority would act to prevent an uprising, for "if the situation continues as it is, this will end up (with) the destruction of what we have built in Palestine."

On Friday night, Israeli security spokesmen said the "noose was tightening" as troops were concentrated near Hebron, with intelligence officials confident that attempts to move the youths to either Jordan, Gaza, or the Sinai had failed. A spokesman for the Prime Minister, Amos Gilead, stated that Netanyahu's view that Hamas was responsible was "built on the base of firm intelligence." IDF forces ransacked Bethlehem's biggest Islamic charity, devoted to orphan's care, in the Jabal al-Mawalih neighborhood and took away computers and files.

==== Day 9 ====
On 21 June, Israeli forces concentrated their investigations on villages north of Hebron, searching wells, pits, and houses. According to Palestinian reports, an elderly man, Ali Abed Jabir, either died during an altercation with Israeli troops who broke into his home while ransacking houses in the village of Haris, or was denied passage for medical treatment after suffering a heart attack. Israel sources state the house was not raided and, on being told of the heart-attack, an Israeli ambulance was called. A further 39 Palestinians, primarily in Hebron and Bethlehem, were arrested in overnight raids, bringing the number seized to roughly 370, 75 of whom had been released in the 2011 prisoner swap. IDF sources challenged the report, saying only 10 Hamas 'terrorists' were seized. Further claims of soldiers stealing money were made by villagers in Beit Kahil. In the village of al-Bireh, several houses were ransacked, and soldiers broke into the Noon Center for Islamic Studies and the Palmedia TC company where they confiscated computers and damaged furniture. The IDF said cash had been confiscated in 21 homes of the 146 homes searched overnight. Palestinian sources also stated that in a predawn raid in Nablus, a female reporter was assaulted and troops shot and injured two Palestinian teenagers. In the late afternoon three fire trucks, with pumps to empty pools of water, and an ATV rescue unit were rushed to assist special forces searching an area riddled with caves and wells north of Hebron, between Highway 35 and Highway 60, reportedly without concrete intelligence leads. Netanyahu reaffirmed that 'the information in Israel's hands unequivocally indicates that Hamas is responsible for the abduction of the youths.'

==== Day 10 ====
On 22 June, Israeli units shot dead two Palestinians and wounded another 11 in overnight clashes in Ramallah and Nablus, while nine (Israeli statistic) to 38 (Palestinian statistic) were arrested and five charity offices were raided. Israeli forces also raided Abu Dis and Al-Quds University's law faculty, seizing flags and several computers. Ahmad Said Suod Khalid (27), an epileptic, of Ein Beit al-Ma' refugee camp was shot in the abdomen, back, and thigh, for refusing an order to turn back as he insisted on going to a mosque for dawn prayers. Muhammad Ismail Atallah Tarifi (30) was found dead on the roof of a building opposite an Israeli sniper position, an autopsy found he was shot dead by an M16, a rifle in use with the IDF. Mourners at his funeral in al-Bireh later complained that settlers from Psagot had fired at them, injuring one. Palestinians, protesting at the cooperation given Israeli forces by their own police, who dispersed crowds by firing live ammunition in the air, smashed four local police cars in Ramallah, and, once Israelis had withdrawn from the city, raided a police station in Al Manara Square. Abbas, affirming that he was not convinced Hamas was responsible, called on Netanyahu to condemn two earlier killings, and asked if the criminal kidnapping justified 'the killing of Palestinian youth in cold blood?' The Palestinian Prisoners' Society named 420 people so far arrested, claimed Israel consistently understated the numbers and refused to disclose where they are detained.

On Sunday, the Palestinian Authority asked for an urgent convening of the UN Security Council, while mulling an appeal both to the High Contracting Parties of the Fourth Geneva Convention and the UN General Assembly to put an end what it considered to be "collective punishment," "Israeli terrorist aggression against the State of Palestine," and what Hanan Ashrawi termed "a reign of terror directed against a captive Palestinian population."

==== Day 11 ====
On 23 June, 80 locations, including seven Hamas-linked charities, were raided from the Nablus to Hebron and Jenin areas, with a further 37 Palestinians detained overnight. Four money-changing shops in Hebron and one in Bethlehem were also searched, and their computers confiscated. The number of Palestinians under detention rose to 471. An officer interviewed on Walla! said that Israel, having achieved most of its "band of targets," would close the operation, and that the military incursion pattern in the West Bank, apart from detention raids, would stop within days. No clue to the teenagers' whereabouts, had turned up, but the operation, in crippling Hamas's infrastructure, had been a success. Netanyahu declared: "We've pretty much figured out who are the kidnappers—the actual perpetrators, the supporters, the command structure—and there's no question, these are members of Hamas."

==== Day 12 ====
On 24 June 120 buildings were searched and four to 13 Palestinians were rounded up by Israeli forces in the Hebron area, Beit Kahil, Beit Awwa, al-Arrub refugee camp, and the Hebron neighbourhoods of al-Mahawir, al-Bassa, and al-Hawooz, bringing the number of sites examined to 1,800 and the number of detained Palestinians, in the IDF calculation, to 354, or according to Palestinian sources, over 500. As town searches and arrests wound down, investigators shifted their focus to interrogations of detainees and scrutiny of the 150 security cameras in the area in which the kidnapping is believed to have taken place. The IDF said it had no substantial lead on the boys' whereabouts, or fate. A lawyer for the PA said that in the wake of the West Bank round-up, the number of Palestinian minors detained in Israeli jails exceeded 250, and that the hunt for the missing Israeli youths served to cover up this fact.

==== Day 13 ====
On 25 June, 17 Palestinians were arrested overnight in Yatta, Beit Ummar, Hebron and Bethlehem among them legislative council members Khalid Tafish and Anwar Zaboun, both of Bethlehem, bringing the number of Palestinian legislators arrested in the campaign to 12. Of the 19 people arrested in Beit Ummar since the start of the search, 14 are minors. A Palestinian youth in Khursa, Younis al-Rjoub (18), was shot in the abdomen during a clash with Israeli soldiers.

==== Day 14 ====
On 26 June, the Israel Security Agency released the names of two Hamas suspects. The ISA stated that both men had engaged in terrorism, been arrested and served time in the past, and were immediately considered suspects. ISA and Palestinian authorities said they had disappeared from their homes on the night of the kidnapping, and ISA believed them to be integral members of the kidnapping group.

Overnight, 136 structures were searched and a further 10 Palestinians were arrested in the Hebron area on suspicion of being terrorists. Fatima Ismail Issa Rushdi (78) died of a heart attack during an Israeli raid on the Arruba refugee camp. Nine youths were injured by tear gas or rubber bullets. Two boys, aged 13 and 14, were arrested in Dura. 44-year-old Ismail Ahmad al-Hawamda was shot in the foot, running away from a checkpoint in the Hebron district town of al-Samu. Despite the Oslo Accords stipulating coordination with the PA security service for Israeli entry into West Bank Areas in the Area A, in what was called an "unprecedented" move, Israeli units raided the Tunis and Rafidia neighbourhoods of Nablus and Balata refugee camp without prior clearance. Two hundred homes in Awarta were also raided.

According to Israeli figures, state detentions numbered 381, of whom 282 are affiliated to Hamas. The number of locations searched rose to 1,955, including 64 Hamas institutions. Palestinian figures state that 566 were detained, six were shot dead, and over 120 wounded; two elderly people died of heart attacks during Israeli operations, and more than 1,200 homes were searched.

=== Week 3 (27 June – 3 July) ===
==== Day 18 ====
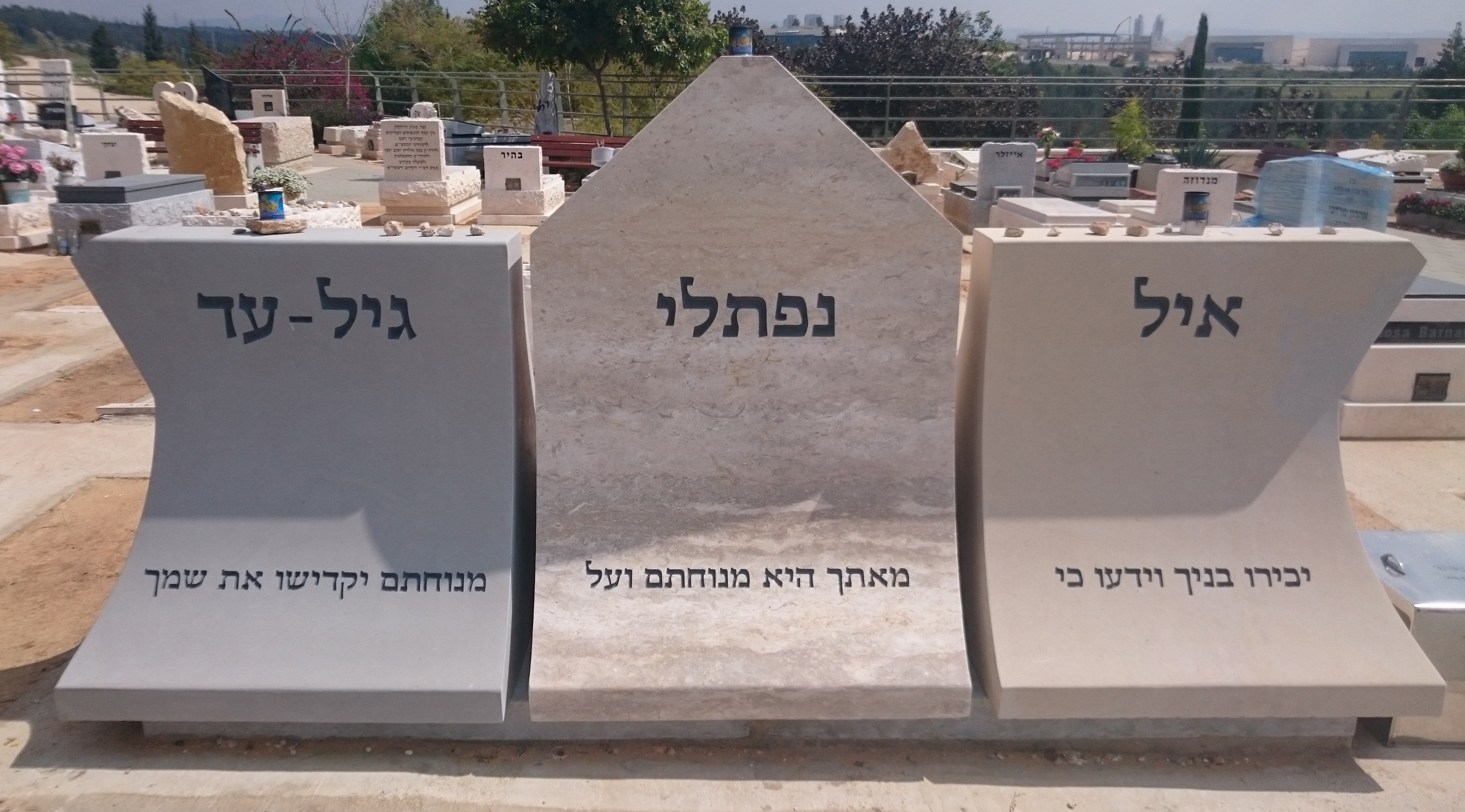
Graves of the three teenagers, Modi'in Cemetery

On 30 June, a search team located the bound bodies of the three boys on land purchased recently by the Qawasmeh family in an open field near Khirbet Aranava in the Wadi Tellem area, between Halhul and Karmei Tzur, about 3 kilometres (1.9 mi) west of the former, just north of Hebron. A high security source revealed that:

The quick solving of the crime by the Shin Bet, which within a 24-hour period identified the kidnappers, together with military pressure in the field, prevented the kidnappers from hiding the bodies and negotiating with Israel for their return.

The ambulance carrying the three bodies was attacked by Palestinians as it left Halhul, the location where the bodies had been found. The Palestinians hurled rocks and paint at the ambulance, smashing its windshield and blinding the windows, but failed to cause the driver to lose control.

Just after midnight, Israeli military detonated explosives in the Hebron homes of the two main suspects, Marwan Qawasmeh and Amer Abu Aisha.

==== Day 19 ====
The joint funeral of Yifrach, Fraenkel, and Shaer was scheduled for 17:30 on 1 July. Huge crowds delayed it for over an hour.

Israeli jets and helicopters struck 34 locations in the Hamas-run Gaza Strip in response to more than 20 rockets being fired at Israel from Gaza. A 19-year-old Palestinian man, Yousouf Al-Zagha, was shot dead by Israeli troops during a raid in the northern town of Jenin. An IDF spokesperson said the man had thrown a grenade at the troops, while his family maintained he had been carrying eggs home for suhoor, the predawn meal during the fast of Ramadan.

==== Day 20 ====
A Palestinian teenager was abducted from East Jerusalem and murdered. Israeli police located the body within hours, and arrested Israeli nationalist suspects several days later. The kidnapping and murder of Mohammed Abu Khdeir was soundly denounced by all of the families of the Israeli kidnapping victims as well as by many Israeli governmental and non-governmental public figures.

=== Week 4 and on (4 July and after) ===
On 4 July, Israel stated it was searching for a third suspect, Husam Dofsh, absent from his home since the kidnapping. A relative, Jihad Dofsh, had blown himself up in a "work accident" in a Hamas explosives laboratory in Hebron, and one of Qawasmeh's relatives had died in the same incident. Husam Dofsh was arrested in a Hebron coffee-shop the following day, after phoning an Israeli news site to protest his innocence.

For about two weeks in July, Israeli military preparations began for direct fighting inside of Gaza, whilst Hamas rocket fire into Israel took place. The military publicly announced on 17 July that it would go into Gaza, an intervention that caused at least 25 soldiers killed and scores injured on the Israeli side over the 20 to 21 July period. Public opinion in the nation is strongly divided, with, for example, the newspaper Haaretz editorializing that the "soft Gaza sand... could turn into quicksand" and warning about the "wholesale killing" of Palestinian civilians. The campaign in the Gaza is referred to by Israel as Operation Protective Edge.

On 20 August, Hamas official Saleh Al-'Arouri spoke at the conference of the International Union of Muslim Scholars in Istanbul, where he said the group's military wing was responsible for the kidnapping of the three Israeli teens, saying it was an expression of popular will. Khaled Mashal, the Hamas leader, while recognizing that Hamas members were responsible, attempted to distance his organization from the killing two days later. Stating Hamas's opposition to killing civilians, he said the leadership had no advance knowledge of the abduction, which he regarded as a legitimate act by a frustrated people living under occupation, and that it had only learnt of its details from Israeli investigations.

In July, demolition orders were handed out to the Qawasmeh and Abu Eisheh families and to Husam Ali Al Qawasmeh who was not a suspect in the killing but arrested for being a Hamas members. Despite protests from human rights groups, the families homes were demolished in August, displacing 39 Palestinians.

== Aftermath ==
Following the kidnappings and the escalating firing of missiles by Palestinian militants towards civilians in southern Israel, Israel decided to embark on Operation Protective Edge. On 3 July 2014, the Israeli Air Force conducted 15 air strikes in Gaza directed at Hamas targets in response to a rocket attack from Palestinian militants. The previous night, fifteen Palestinians were injured in the IAF strikes and two buildings ruined Operation Protective Edge, became a ground war on 8 July 2014.

On 11 July 2014, a series of bills in the United States Senate and the U.S. House of Representatives was launched, attempting to solve the boys' murder, based upon Yaakov Naftali Fraenkel's dual US-Israeli citizenship. The new legislation would offer a $5 million reward for information on the abduction and murder.

== Accusations of collective punishment ==
On Day 7, The Palestinian Authority declared that the Israeli modus operandi of clamping down on towns with closures and continual arrest of Hamas members constituted collective punishment. Amnesty International issued a statement on 19 June calling both for the release of the Israeli youths, their humane treatment while being held, and for Israel to lift several measures it defined as collective punishment in violation of the Fourth Geneva Convention and customary international humanitarian law.

According to The Economist, "The Israeli security forces closed off the area around Hebron. Some 23,000 local Palestinians were barred from travelling to their jobs in Israel. A series of charitable organisations that used to be run by Hamas were closed down and a dairy, which employs hundreds of Palestinians, was demolished. Hebronites were prevented from travelling abroad."

In July 2014, the Geneva International Centre for Justice sent an urgent appeal to protest against the imminent house demolition of the homes of the extended families of the suspects and of Husam Ali Al Qawasmeh. The demolitions which the Centre designated as collective punishment would affect 39 people.

Two scholars rejected the claim that the actions constituted collective punishment:

- Robbie Sabel, a professor of international law at the Hebrew University of Jerusalem and a former legal adviser to Israel's Foreign Ministry, argued that Israel's actions shouldn't be considered collective punishment because they were aimed exclusively at finding the kidnapped teenagers and weakening the terrorist organizations behind their abduction and that in a search for kidnapped civilians, the arrests of members affiliated with the organization responsible for the kidnapping is legitimate.
- Eugene Kontorovich, international law professor at Northwestern University and Hebrew University said: "rounding up suspects, or potential witnesses, is not punishment, but rather rudimentary investigative process; especially when the crime is thought to be committed by a complex terror organization, the number of potential witnesses is high." Kontorovich cited as an example that police often arrest members of a gang after a crime to further investigate the perpetrators or criminal acts.

== Speculations on kidnapping motives ==
Elhanan Miller, writing for The Times of Israel speculated that the motive for the kidnapping could have been to force Israel to release a large number of prisoners in exchange for the three teens. In 2011, Hamas had secured the release of over one thousand prisoners in exchange for Gilad Shalit, whom they had captured five years prior.

Some 300 prisoners went on a hunger strike against the Israeli practice of holding Palestinians in Administrative detention without charges for six months or more, which Israel says is done in cases where the detainee poses an imminent security risk and publicizing the charges could endanger national security. Many Palestinians support the kidnapping of Israeli soldiers and civilians in order to obtain the release of these prisoners. In 2011, Israel released more than a thousand Palestinians in detention, many convicted by Israeli courts for lethal attacks, in exchange for Gilad Shalit, an Israeli soldier kidnapped by Palestinian militants.

Some months before the 2014 incident, an 18-page manual on abduction techniques was published by Hamas. Entitled "Guide for the Kidnapper," it provided an operational guide that outlined the use of pistols with silencers, the use of backup cars, the choice of conducting the abductions on rainy days, a command of Hebrew, the renting of hideouts in areas to avoid arousing suspicions and suggestions to refrain from announcing the outcome of the kidnapping until the victims were secured in a safe house.

The difficulty confronting the Izz ad-Din al-Qassam Brigades, which has an ongoing debate on the issue, is the coordination between the PNA and Israeli security services, which makes executing such operations difficult. Several prior incidents, such as the killings of Givati soldier Gal "Gavriel" Kobi and Baruch Mizrahi, a police intelligence officer, displayed exceptional, high-level skills, strict compartmentalization, and careful preparations for an escape route, features shared by the kidnapping. These elements resemble the carefully planned abductions of IDF soldiers by Hezbollah on Israel's northern border.

Israel said that the IDF and the Shin Bet have foiled between 54 and 64 kidnapping plots since 2013. The PA said it had foiled 43 of them. The high success rate (95%) in blocking such plots is due to the very close cooperation between the security forces of both sides. Hamas has put considerable effort into kidnapping attempts through its large network.

A week into the search for the missing youth, Avi Issacharoff cast doubts on the premise for West Bank operations, which in his view 'targeted the weak'—since Hamas has neither a large or strong presence there—and argued that the operational order, if there was one, came from either Gaza, or abroad, perhaps Ankara-based deportee Saleh al-Arouri, or Khaled Mashal, who appeared to hint a month earlier in replying to a letter from an imprisoned Hamas leader, after Netanyahu reneged on releasing a fourth group of Palestinian prisoners, that the Izz ad-Din al-Qassam Brigades would be his reply. Issacharoff concluded however that, "There isn't a smoking gun to prove the Hamas leadership is complicit in the kidnapping."

On 20 August, a Hamas official identified the West Bank Qawasmeh clan, a Hamas ally, for the kidnapping of the three Israeli teens and shared their motives. Saleh Al-'Arouri of the Hamas leadership delivered an address on behalf of Khaled Mashal at the conference of the International Union of Muslim Scholars in Istanbul. In it he said: "Our goal was to ignite an intifada in the West Bank and Jerusalem, as well as within the 1948 borders... Your brothers in the Al-Qassam Brigades carried out this operation to support their imprisoned brothers, who were on a hunger strike... The mujahideen captured these settlers in order to have a swap deal."

== Hitchhiking debate in Israel ==
As events unfolded, the dangerous nature of hitchhiking in what Israelis refer to as "the territories" prompted a debate, regarded by some in the settler and religious Zionist communities as a kind of victim blaming, about the practice of hitching rides on roads in the Palestinian territories, widely regarded as a cavalier and irresponsible habit for the costs involved in redeeming anyone who is captured. The normal Israeli practice is one where drivers pull up, declaring their destination, and, by their accent, allowing potential hikers at trempiada (hitchhiking stations) an opportunity to examine the clues before they accept or decline a lift. Such hitchhiking has long been a hallowed method of travel among Israelis, but as abductions and killings of hitchhikers, mainly IDF soldiers, began to take root in the 1980s, one incident in October 1994 led to the passage of regulations that forbade military personnel from resorting to this method of travel. To hammer the message home, recruits doing basic training are required now to view snuff films that highlight the dangers, and military police "abduct" and punish recruits who do not take it seriously.

Israeli governments have not regulated civilian recourse to hitchhiking, and laws delegate responsibility to parents, expecting them to advise their children. The practice however remains widespread among the dati leumi community of religious Zionists for several reasons: many of them, as in this case, have children boarding in West Bank settlements, where public transport facilities are poor. Haaretz reported that for mitzvah-observant adolescents, it is "a rite of passage, a way of life, a declaration of independence and of ownership of the land." Retired Brigadier General, Nitzan Nuriel, a former counter-terrorism officer in the Prime Minister's Office, declared on Israeli television that hitchhiking had an ideological edge: it made a statement about who owns the territory.

== Reactions ==
=== Israel ===
One anonymous Israeli government official stated to Reuters news agency that Israel was looking to use the search as an opportunity for a wider crackdown on Hamas, and were looking into the legal aspects of deporting Hamas leaders from the West Bank. A Hebrew-language Facebook page calling on PM Netanyahu to assume his responsibilities and requesting that a Palestinian "terrorist" be executed every hour until the three youths are restored to their families, gained 10,000 thumb-ups within hours.

With a perception in Israel, expressed by Thane Rosenbaum, that the sympathy long lavished on Israel was dwindling, the government stepped up hasbara efforts abroad, especially in Brazil where the 2014 FIFA World Cup was then the focus of much of the world's attention. An aircraft trailed a #BringBackOurBoys banner along a Rio de Janeiro beach. The families of the missing boys went to Geneva to address the UN's Human Rights Council.

- On television, Netanyahu declared that "Anyone trying to harm Israeli civilians will be harmed in return."
- Israel's Economic Minister Naftali Bennett said Israel will make membership of Hamas a 'ticket to hell', branding it one 'of the most "lethal, barbaric organizations in the world." Both the PA and Hamas, he affirmed, formed a 'complete culture where Israel is [perceived as] Satan.'
- 15 June. Moshe Ya'alon cited the kidnapping as "additional testimony to the cruelty and seething hatred that guides the terror groups in our region."
- 'Israel has decided to perform a root canal to uproot everything green in the West Bank,' reported on Israel's Army Radio, green being the colour of Hamas.
- Israel's ambassador to Italy, Naor Gilon, declared that "Europe backs Hamas' government and the kidnapping of children and Israeli civilians."
- 'We're witnessing the unrestrained brutality of Islamic terrorism, both in Israel and around us.' Netanyahu to Ban Ki-moon.
- 'Not only are the kidnappers terrorists, but so is Hanin Zoabi'. Avigdor Liberman, writing in Facebook of his Knesset colleague.
- Rabbi Dov Lior said the abduction was God's punishment for anti-religious legislation in the Knesset and Israel's readiness to abandon parts of the Land of Israel. Yuval Diskin countered: If so, why did God arrange for religious boys to be kidnapped if he was angry with secular Israelis?
- The Haredi Yated Ne'eman claimed that government policies aimed at drafting yeshiva students into the army against their will was the cause of the abductions.
- 15 June. Jews and Muslims who work fields as part of the Shorashim/Judhur cooperative project near where the kidnapping took place met and discussed their distress for several hours.
- 17 June. Jews many from the Gush Etzion and Muslims held a joint prayer session at the kidnapping site. Rabbi Michael Melchior said Islamic clerics were concerned and demanded the youths' immediate release, and Israel's distress was shared by Palestinians. Jerusalem Sheikh Ibrahim Al-Hawa recited the Al-Fatiha chapter of the Quran, adding that 'there is a wall between our two nations, and we hope to remove the wall separating the hearts of humans.'
- In an interview with Globes Yishai Fraenkel, uncle of the missing Naftali Fraenkel, recounted that he had received "no few messages of support and encouragement from Palestinian sources" who had said they were repulsed by the kidnapping and were "praying for the boys' welfare."
- Human rights organization B'Tselem condemned the kidnapping of the three students and called for their immediate release, saying "any deliberate attack against civilians is absolutely prohibited." They also cautioned Israeli authorities to uphold human rights and avoid collective punishment of the local population in their efforts to bring the students home safely. Later B'Tselem condemned the killing of the three students by saying "deliberate targeting of civilians undermines all moral, legal and human principles. The deliberate killing of civilians is defined as a grave breach of international humanitarian law, and cannot be justified, regardless of the circumstances."
- Knesset Member Hanin Zoabi, a Palestinian, stated that the kidnappers were not terrorists, but frustrated people resorting to such measures 'until the citizens of Israel and the public sober up and relate to the suffering of others,' mentioning the mothers of Palestinians who are being detained without trial.
- 'Three Israeli teenagers were kidnapped, but the two Palestinian kids who were killed [on Friday] were not even mentioned [in your broadcast]? The blood of Jews is more precious than the blood of Palestinians?' Hanin Zoabi.
- On 1 July 2014, settlers started two new outposts, one on a hilltop in the E1 area near Ma'ale Adumim and the other near Halhul.
- In late August, the IDF, acting on political instruction, announced it was confiscating 988 acres (1.54 square miles) of privately owned Palestinian land south of Bethlehem, as a response to the killing of the teens. Naftali Bennett described the move as an "appropriate Zionist response to murder," adding: "What we did yesterday was a display of Zionism. Building is our answer to murder." The U.S. rebuked the move as 'counter-productive', while France condemned it and Britain deplored the decision stating that it 'would seriously damage Israel's international reputation.' Defining the area as state land rather than private Palestinian land was hailed by the Gush Etzion settlements council as an opportunity to build up Gva'ot, an illegal Israeli settlement of 16 families. Robert Fisk stated that it was the first time Palestinian land had been seized, not on God's warrant, or security grounds, or because of deed of title, but for revenge, a measure which set a dangerous precedent.

==== Social media in Israel ====
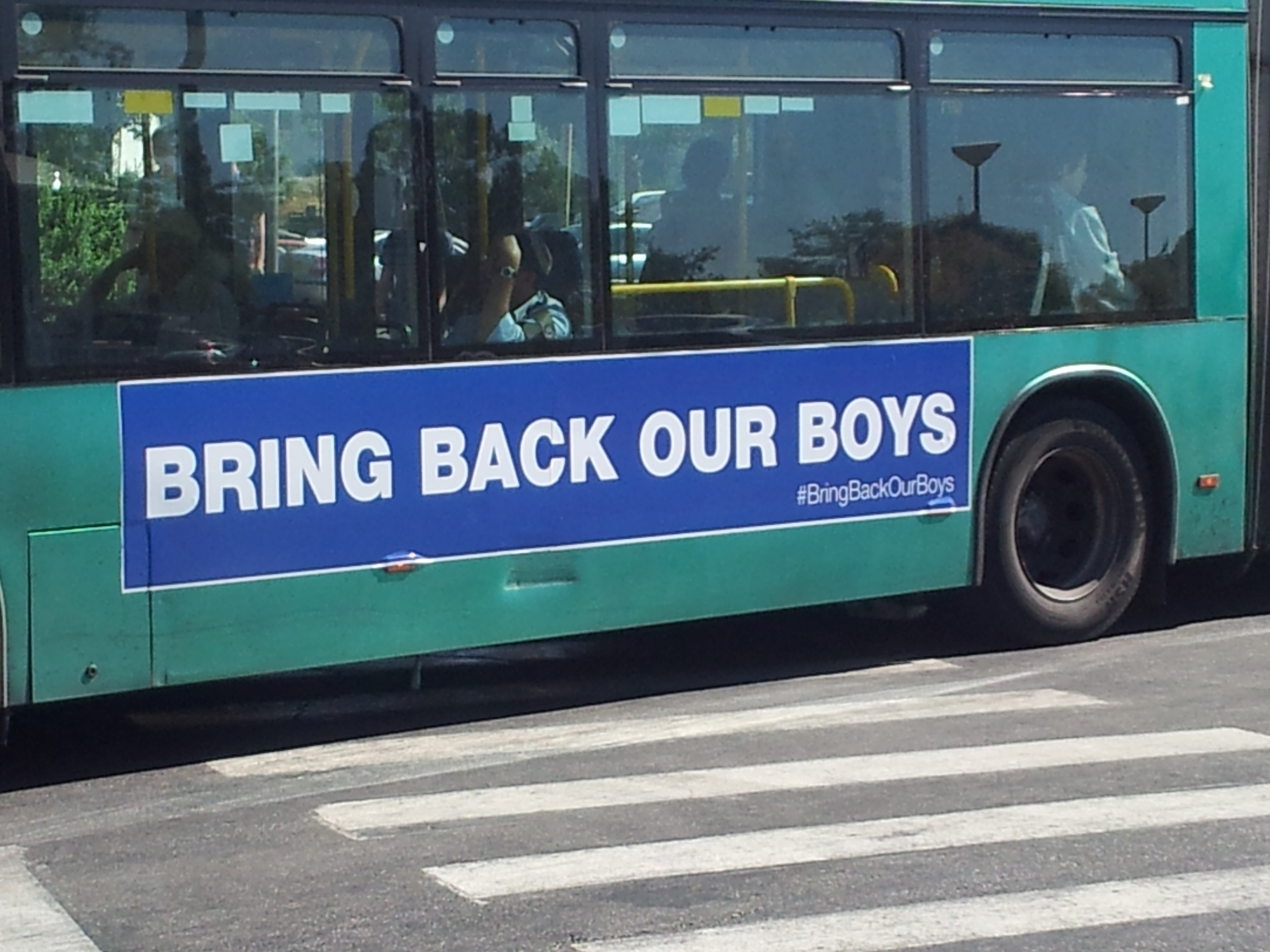
"Bring back our boys" on Jerusalem bus, June 2014.

A social media campaign was started soon after the kidnapping advocating for the safe return of the teens under the hashtag #BringBackOurBoys. According to Robert Mackey, the campaign was initiated by a "group of Israelis trained to promote their country online" The campaign's label attempted to make the link between the then-recent #BringBackOurGirls campaign following the Chibok schoolgirl kidnapping in Nigeria. One of the organizers stated the social media effort "is simply a cry out to the world to bring those boys back," adding that "We're only trying to do whatever we can to help the international community to put pressure to release those kids." On 15 June, around 25,000 people gathered for a prayer at the Western Wall for the release of the kidnapped teenagers.

==== Violent Israeli reactions ====
On the night of 1 July a Palestinian family registered a complaint at police concerning an attempt to kidnap their child, 10-year-old Moussa Zalum, on Shu'fat's main street in Jerusalem. At the time, they reported, he was walking with his mother and brother when a car stopped and people tried to pull him into the vehicle. The child managed to wriggle free, and the car sped off.

After the bodies of the three boys were found, settlers attacks on Palestinians in the West Bank were reported. Settlers from Tel Rumeida in Hebron were in the streets, attacking Palestinians and internationals. The Border Police stormed the hill towards the gathered crowd of Palestinians and internationals, exploded a sound grenade and injured a Palestinian in the following clash.

On 2 July a 16-year-old Palestinian from Shu'fat camp, Mohammed Abu Khdeir, was killed; preliminary results from the autopsy suggest he was burnt alive. The boy's family believes the killing to be an act of revenge from Jewish settlers for the murder of the three Israeli teenagers. Netanyahu urged a swift inquiry into the "reprehensible murder" and called on people to respect the rule of law.

On the evening of 3 July, Palestinians of Shu'fat reported to the Israeli police that four settlers from Pisgat Zeev had attempted to kidnap a 7-year-old local child, and had fled on being thwarted. On Friday Palestinians of Osarin near Nablus in the West Bank complained that one of them, 22-year-old Tariq Ziad Zuhdi Adeli, had been sprayed with a gas by settlers, abducted in a car, taken outside the village and then sustained injuries from a hatchet attack to his legs.

Three days later, a video was aired, that appeared as the beating up of 15-year-old American citizen Tariq Abu Khdeir by Israeli security forces. Tariq, a second-cousin of murdered Mohammed Abu Khdeir, is a student who attends Universal Academy of Florida high school in Tampa, Florida. Israeli authorities then detained Tariq. The US State Department called for "a speedy, transparent and credible investigation and full accountability for any excessive use of force." Israeli Border Police started an official investigation on 5 July.

=== Palestine ===
Palestinian president Mahmoud Abbas, defying widespread popular Palestinian support for the kidnapping as a means of securing the release of Palestinians held in Israeli jails, criticized the action, saying the youths must be returned, and that Palestinian Authority security was cooperating with Israel to try to locate them. Abbas' office released a statement condemning the kidnapping and the Israeli response of raids and arrests. At US urging, Abbas was working closely with Israel to coordinate the search for the teens. A PA spokesman stated that holding Palestinian authorities responsible for kidnappings in Area C of the West Bank, where Israel exercises full military control and prohibits a Palestinian police presence places the PA in an impossible position.

The Palestinian Authority's official newspaper marked the kidnapping with a cartoon that spoofed the World Cup logo. Three hands hold the globe in the FIFA World Cup logo, but in Al-Hayat Al-Jadida, three hands held small helpless figures with their hands up in surrender. While the World Cup logo says "Brazil" under it, the spoof says Khalil, the Arabic name for Hebron, a city near the site of the kidnapping.

A cartoon on a Fatah Facebook page presented the three kidnapped Israeli teenagers as rats caught on three hooks on a fishing rod. Each rat was emblazoned with a Star of David, and the title of the cartoon read "Masterstroke." A picture on the same Facebook page showed a hand with words written on three of the fingers. Read in succession they said: "Three Shalits, long live Palestine."

Hamas spokesmen Sami Abu Zuhri and Fawzi Barhoum criticized the PNA collaboration with Israel to track down the culprits, and Barhoum called the kidnappers "heroes."

In social media, many Palestinians criticized what they see as the strong emphasis placed by Israel on the teenagers' disappearance to the detriment of Palestinian suffering, citing the case of two Palestinian boys shot dead by Israelis at a protest in Beitunia during a Nakba Day protest on 15 May 2014.

On Twitter, in response to the IDF campaign, Palestinian sympathizers appropriated the hashtag as their own, drawing attention to both Palestinian prisoners in Israeli goals and Palestinian children killed by Israeli actions. One mentioned 5,271 Palestinian political prisoners, 192 administrative detainees, 17 women and 196 children. Senior Hamas and Islamic Jihad officials have stated that kidnapping Israeli soldiers and settlers is the only route to obtain the release of Palestinian prisoners. Palestinian Fatah and Hamas activists called on Palestinian shopkeepers and businessmen in Hebron, via Facebook, Twitter and other social media, to destroy any CCTV footage that could be used by Israel to help locate the teens. Fatah activists in Hebron also confiscated security cameras in order to frustrate the search.

In the Gaza Strip, families of Palestinians imprisoned by Israel celebrated the kidnapping by handing out sweets to passersby from a protest tent that had been erected to express solidarity. Gazan Palestinians also released a song on social networks mocking the kidnappings, and called for additional abductions. A Palestinian group mounted a video on YouTube parodying the abduction, in a fictional scenario featuring an "Abu Saqer el Khalili Brigades, the Kick Ass Branch," apparently taking the event to be an Israeli plot with Arab complicity while mocking Islamic extremism.

- Hamas parliamentarian Salah Bardawil: "We are capable of igniting a third Intifada which is an irrevocable right that will go off when more pressure is exerted on the Palestinian people."
- "I don't plan to punish anyone based on suspicions or because Netanyahu claims something. If Netanyahu has information, he should update me and we'll take care of it according to our laws." Mahmoud Abbas.
- "The world cannot stand by while Israel, the occupying power, commits such grave breaches of international law." Hanan Ashrawi.

=== International ===
- United Nations Secretary-General Ban Ki-moon released a statement condemning the abduction, expressing "deep concern on the trend toward violence on the ground and attendant loss of life, including today of a child in Gaza as a result of a recent Israeli airstrike." He expressed solidarity with the families of the abducted, called for their immediate release and called for restraint on both sides. After the dead bodies were found, Ban Ki-moon condemned the murders of the three Israeli teenagers, calling them a "heinous act by enemies of peace that aim to entrench division and distrust and widen the Middle East conflict."
- In response to proposals in the Security Council to make a statement to the press condemning the kidnapping, and the collective punishment and deaths of Palestinians, no agreement could be found: the US representative Samantha Power said that any direct criticism of Israel in the statement would constitute a 'red line' for Americans.
- United States said that it was "very concerned" about the well-being of the teens, and that it was working with Israel and the Palestinian Authority to resolve the situation. After the dead bodies of the three teenagers were found, the US Secretary of State John Kerry made a statement saying "the news of the murder of these three Israeli teenagers—Naftali Fraenkel, Gilad Shaar and Eyal Yifrach—is simply devastating. We all had so much hope that this story would not end this way." President of the United States Barack Obama responded to the deaths by sending his condolences to the families of the teenagers and condemning the "senseless act of terror against innocent youth."
- Canada's Foreign Minister John Baird expressed deep concern over the event and urged Palestinian security authorities, "who have been trained through Canadian and US leadership," to make every effort to ensure the safe return of the children to their families.
- United Kingdom After the dead bodies of the three teenagers were found, Prime Minister David Cameron described their deaths as an "appalling and inexcusable act of terror."
- France President François Hollande released a statement saying he was "shocked,” "strongly condemn[ed] the cowardly murder[s]," and "extend[ed] his sincere condolences to their families and to the Israeli people and authorities." He attended that he "express[ed] his concern in the face of the increased violence in the West Bank and Gaza," "condemn[ed] the rocket fire from Gaza into Israeli territory," and "call[ed] for everything to be done to prevent any further casualties and the risk of an escalation of violence."
- Spain condemned the kidnapping, along with Palestinian rocket attacks on Israel, and called for restraint.
- Netherlands After the dead bodies of the three teenagers were found, Dutch Foreign Minister Frans Timmermans issued a statement saying that the Dutch government heard the news of the murder "with profound sadness and horror. These boys were in the prime of their lives and have been the victim of a horrific crime. The government of the Netherlands hopes that their killers will be apprehended soon and brought to justice."
- European Union's ambassador to Israel tweeted that he was "deeply concerned" about the events and was hoping for the safe return of the teens. Catherine Ashton's office condemned the kidnapping after five days, in the wake of Israeli official expressions of disappointment. On 28 June the EU reiterated its call for the safe return of the youths. It regretted the increasing violence, particularly the killing of several Palestinians, and called on Israel to only use proportionate means in its search. It praised the Palestinian security services for their help in searching for the abductees, and condemned Hamas for praising the kidnapping. After the dead bodies of the three teenagers were found, the EU's ambassador to Israel, Lars Faaborg-Andersen, tweeted that he sent condolences to the Israeli government on the "despicable" murders, "with hope that perpetrators are soon arrested."
- Egypt's foreign ministry released a statement asking Israel to stop what it called "its collective punishment of the Palestinian people," after it bombed dozens of sites in the Gaza Strip a day after the bodies of three missing Israeli teenagers were found. Egypt urged the Israeli forces to practice restraint and allow the Palestinian authorities to take on its responsibility in tracking the culprits, it also renewed its condemnation for all forms of violence that cause the death of civilians on both sides.
- Colombia's Foreign Ministry released a statement condemning the assassination of the 3 teenagers that had previously been kidnapped on 12 June while on the same statement declaring the murder as an act of terrorism. Colombia expressed its condolences to the families of the victims and called to "reflect, and ponder on this difficult moments, in accordance to international rights."
- Nigeria's President Goodluck Jonathan wrote to Netanyahu: .".. I assure you that we are in solidarity with you, as we believe that any act of terrorism against any nation or group is an act against our common humanity. We unequivocally condemn this dastardly act, and demand that the children are released unconditionally by their abductors."
- Holy See The Vatican condemned the killing of three Israeli teenagers in the West Bank as a "hideous and unacceptable crime" and an obstacle to peace, calling the news of the deaths "terrible and dramatic."
- Quartet envoy Tony Blair posted a tweet saying that the abduction and killing of "these three young people was a heinous and wicked thing to do."
- Foreign Minister Avigdor Liberman said that Germany, France, Britain, Belgium, Bulgaria and Norway all condemned the kidnapping of three Israelis in phone conversations with him.

== See also ==
- 2014 in Israel
- 2014 in the Palestinian territories
- Death and ransoming of Oron Shaul
- Killing of Avi Sasportas and Ilan Saadon (Hamas, 1989)
- Kidnapping and murder of Nissim Toledano (Hamas, 1992)
- Kidnapping and murder of Yaron Chen (Hamas, 1993)
- Kidnapping and murder of Nachshon Wachsman (Hamas, 1994)
