= Beitunia killings =

2014 killing of two Palestinian teenagers by Israel Border Police

- Part of the Israeli–Palestinian conflict
- Location: 31°53′20.24″N 35°10′03.12″E; Beitunia, Palestine
- Date: May 14, 2014; 12 years ago
- Deaths: 2
- Injuries: 2
- Perpetrators: Ben Deri, Israeli border policeman (convicted for causing death by negligence by firing live ammunition by mistake)

The Beitunia killings refers to the consecutive killings of two Palestinian teenagers which took place on the occasion of the annual Nakba Day protests on May 15, 2014, near the Israeli Ofer Prison outside Beitunia in the occupied West Bank. Israel described the protest as a riot in which a crowd refused to disperse, and initially denied responsibility, saying the cause of the deaths was unknown, the deaths were faked, that video clips of the killings either failed to capture the violence of the scene shortly before or might have been manipulated, that soldiers had been provoked, and that only rubber bullets had been fired.

Six months later, 21-year-old Ben Deri, an Israel Border Police officer, was arrested and charged with shooting one of the two killed Palestinians, 17-year-old Nadim Nawarah (or Nadeem Nuwarah) after forensic evidence showed one of the lethal bullets came from his gun. Deri was convicted for causing death by negligence and sentenced to nine months in jail, after he pleaded guilty and admitted accidental use of live ammunition.

== Background ==
Palestinians commemorate Nakba Day in remembrance of the forced displacement when hundreds of thousands of Palestinians fled or were driven from their homes in 500 villages in Palestine in 1948, as Israeli soldiers fought to establish their state. The occasion is often celebrated from the Galilee to Gaza, with protest rallies, the waving of black mourning flags, the flourishing of keys to lost Palestinian homes, the sounding of sirens at midday, and marches to the sites of destroyed homes and villages. For Israel's Prime Minister Binjamin Netanyahu the purpose of such Palestinian commemoration is to ‘mark the tragedy of the establishment of the State of Israel, the state of the Jewish people.’

The event on May 15, 2014, the 64th anniversary of the catastrophe, was also marked by solidarity demonstrations for Palestinians in administrative detention who, from 24 April, were conducting a hunger-strike, in protest against what Palestinian sources stated was Israeli backtracking on an agreement, made after an earlier strike, to restrict the practice of administrative detention only to exceptional cases. In the past, such days of remembrance have at times turned violent: in 2011 Israeli troops responded to an attempt by thousands of protesters to breach Israel's northern frontiers by opening fire that killed 10 people and injuring hundreds. Israel has been accused by Amnesty International of being 'trigger-happy' in adopting excessive force on such occasions; 27 fatalities from Israel shooting at stone-throwing demonstrations were registered in the preceding year, 2013. On the occasion of the 2014 commemorations, clashes, described as relatively low-level, broke out between Israeli forces and demonstrating Palestinians in Ni'lin, Bethlehem, the Al-Isawiya neighborhood in East Jerusalem. In two areas, at the Qalandia crossing near Ramallah, and in Beitunia, violence was more marked. Overall 270 Palestinians, one Israeli soldier and 3 border policemen were injured.

== 15 May 2014 Ofer Prison demonstration ==
At Beitunia, 150 Palestinians attended the commemoration, which took place outside Ofer Prison, where more than 100 Palestinians had been on a hunger strike for weeks to protest their detention, and demonstrators were protesting the Israeli practice detaining people on suspicion for upwards of six months, without charges being laid, and no access to courts, under secret evidence. The Palestinians, among them the two boys later killed, threw rocks and Israeli police employed riot dispersal measures. Israeli sources reported the demonstration turned violent at times, while Palestinian sources say it began peacefully, but turned violent when the demonstrators were shot at by live fire to disperse stone-throwers. In addition to stone-throwing, burning tires were rolled towards Israeli security forces, and Israeli sources stated that five Molotov cocktails were thrown at policemen and a police bomb squad had destroyed an explosive device. Police responding by shooting tear gas canisters, stun grenades and the firing of rubber bullets.

Four Palestinian protestors were shot at the Beitunia demonstration, on the same patch of asphalt. They were Nadim Nuwara (17); Mohammad Mahmoud Odeh Salameh (Abu Thaher; 17); Muhammad al-'Azza (15), and a fourth man (aged 23), who remains unidentified. The shootings took place in a sequence of three separate incidents. The first was Muhammad al-'Azzah, 15, who was shot and wounded in the chest at around 12:20 p.m. The first fatality that day was Nuwara, who was shot some 15 meters from where al-'Azzah had been hit. He was shot through the chest at 13:45. Salameh was also fatally shot in the same location at 14:58. He was pronounced dead on arrival by doctors, having been shot in the back.

Human Rights Watch examined a high-speed photo sequence taken by photojournalist Samer Nazzal just after the killing, and stated that one projectile, seemingly a rubber bullet, appeared to come from the direction of the position of the Israeli forces and struck a Palestinian paramedic, wearing a bright orange vest, who helped carry Nuwara off.

Video footage as well as first-hand accounts, including those of journalists reporting on the protest, indicated that the teenagers who had been killed were unarmed and posed no apparent nor imminent threat and that the shots occurred during a period of calm. Affidavits were collected by Al-Haq from eyewitness and one of the victims. According to the testimony of Muhammad Abdallah 'Azza, he left school with friends to participate in the demonstration at 10:30 that day, and on arriving in Beitunia joined some 60 demonstrators outside the jail precincts. Israeli troops were located in two distinct areas: 8 soldiers were positioned roughly 50 yards away behind a 1-metre high wall that overlooked the street, and a number of protesters threw stones, ineffectively, their way. The soldiers responded with tear gas and rubber bullets. Another group of soldiers stood further off, in Ofer's prison yard behind cement blocks, some150-200 metres away. While watching, behind the stone-throwers, he says he saw a soldier who seemed to be aiming a rifle their way, and then heard live fire, as he was struck in the chest and thrown backwards. Surgeons reported that a bullet hit his left rib, which deflected the shot from his heart, pierced his lungs, and exited through his back.

According to Muhannad Jihad Rabi' (23), he and his friends, including some foreign activists, joined the demonstration at around 12:15 PM and witnessed clashes in which several protests were injured. Towards the end of the clashes, he threw himself on the ground on hearing life fire and noted one Palestinian (Muhammad Salama), who had fallen on the ground, with a hole in his chest. According to the Ramallah journalist Samer Hisham Nazzal (28), who works for Raya News and who arrived on the scene at 1:30, one could hear both rubber bullets and live fire at the time. At 1:40 pm, when stones were no longer being thrown, he heard live fire, and at one point, saw a youth (Nuwara), dressed in black, his face covered by a keffiyeh, holding a schoolbag, fall to the ground. A paramedic who rushed to assist the boy was shot in the head by a rubber-coated bullet. Nazzal (28), a photojournalist, told Human Rights Watch that he arrived at the scene at around 1:30 p.m. after the clashes had begun. He later heard Israeli forces fire both rubber bullets and live ammunition. Witnesses to the incident stated that the sound of live fire, quite distinct from the sound of the type of rubber bullets used by the Israeli Defense Forces, was audible at the time. According to a Palestinian photographer present at the time, this distinction has been confirmed repeatedly by Israeli, Palestinian and international human rights monitors, as well as people who have witnessed demonstrations of this type.

== IDF rules of engagement and statements ==
The Israeli military (IDF) regulations on the use of open-fire in effect at the time in the West Bank, permit opening fire only to prevent a mortal danger to the soldiers or civilians. Border police and soldiers said they had received an explicit order to that effect from Central Command headquarters, forbidding the use of live rounds unless their lives were at risk. After the killings, police said they had adhered to orders and used only rubber bullets. It was further affirmed by the IDF that no live fire was used and that it remained to be determined what was the cause of the result. According to Israel spokesman Micky Rosenfeld, Israeli troops were breaking up a “disturbance” and did not use live fire. Libby Weiss, another IDF spokesperson, said the soldiers had used ‘nonviolent means to try and disperse the crowd”, which had ignored police orders.

A few days later a statement from Defense Minister Moshe Ya'alon conflicted with these earlier versions that the IDF had used non-violent means. The minister instead said 'Israeli troops who allegedly shot dead two Palestinian teenagers during Nakba Day protests in the West Bank last Thursday acted “as appropriate” given that “they were in a situation where their lives were in danger.”' Refuting this latest Israeli version that the border police had following IDF regulations, 21 gigabytes of video, both from four CCTV cameras and footage taken by a CNN crew, showed that the two teenagers had been unarmed and were posing no threat at the time of their deaths. The minister admitted that he had not viewed the videos but that these could be a fabrication, a claim that was taken up by some in the Israeli media.

Reports from Ramallah hospital, where the killed and wounded were taken, stated that the wounds were compatible only with live fire ammunition. Oscar Fernandez-Taranco, the UN's assistant secretary-general for political affairs, stated that the indications were that the two Palestinians killed were both unarmed and appeared to pose no direct threat."

== The release of video evidence ==
On May 19, Defense for Children International – Palestine published footage from Faher Zayed's security cameras on its website. The IDF, according to Mohammad Azza, was seen filming the clashes. The soldier suspended on 28 May for firing his rifle without authorization, formed part of a communications unit which documents the work of combat soldiers, and Human Rights Watch has requested that any videos and photos in their possession be released for public scrutiny. The whole scene was filmed by video cameras placed for security reasons, to prevent break-ins, outside of the store of Faher Zayed, a local Palestinian businessman who furnished the evidence while testifying that Palestinians present at the killings had heard. Four shots reportedly hailed from the Israeli side. On 17 June, according to Zaher, four Israeli military vehicles and 2 dozen soldiers visited his carpentry shop while he was out, and an officer said to an assistant that unless Zayed returned within 5 minutes, his carpentry shop would be burnt to the ground. He was taken for questioning at the Ofer military base. There he was ordered to dismantle his security camera surveillance system, chided for having passed the footage to human rights organizations, accused of fabricated evidence, threatened with legal actions and menaced by one soldier who allegedly said he would "unleash dogs on [my] children". He said that he was interrogated by Israeli forces and threatened with comments like "We will squish you like a bug, you are nothing". IDF spokesman Col. Peter Lerner, stated he was "not aware of the claims raised". Avi Isacharoff, writing of the "apathy that characterizes Israeli journalism on everything having to do with Palestinians", noted that Moshe Ya'alon, alluding to "Pallywood"-style insinuations, challenged the video's credibility without actually viewing it, and asserting in remarks at the West Bank Israeli settlement of Ariel that soldiers had acted as they should have in such circumstances. The IDF claimed that the video, lasting 146 seconds, had been "tendentiously edited", with the result that it failed to cover the violence of the clashes that day. A senior officer briefing journalists cast doubt on the idea that the two were dead. Others claimed that the two killed in the videos were not the same as the two boys whose deaths were registered.

There are several hours of footage about the incident. The first footage, taken by a local business' security camera, was released by Defence for Children International on 19 May. While the widely distributed video showing the two Palestinians being shot was edited down to a few minutes, the full six-hour footage has been reviewed by CNN and others. The IDF spokesman has stated that "The said video is edited in a tendentious manner and does not reflect the level of violence that occurred at the disturbance."

On 20 May, B'Tselem obtained complete footage from all four other security cameras operating opposite the site where the teenagers were killed, and provided 2 sequences, one for each killing, and concluded that the evidence refuted the IDF version and that the evidence pointed to willful killings. The bullet exit and entry evidence from medical sources were consistent, not with rubber bullets, but live ammunition. CNN released footage one of their producers shot of the incident on 22 May. A CNN camera caught an Israel soldier shooting his rifle at the Palestinians at the precise moment Nuwara was shot dead. As the camera pans just 14 seconds later, the injured man can be seen being evacuated from the scene. The CNN video also seems to capture another shot fired by a police officer standing next to the soldier on a hillside above the protesters.

Acting on behalf of the parents of the two deceased youths, Defence for Children International Palestine requested Forensic Architecture, a research agency based at the University of London, to recreate the events on 15 May. Using the CNN footage the agency undertook analyses of the videos of the killing, space where the killings took place and the sounds they contained. The results were that "it was an Israeli Border Policeman that fired upon Nawara, identifies the shooter, and demonstrates that he was firing live ammunition. The shooter’s actions undertaken to cover up for his actions are exposed. It suggests that the killing was intentional and premeditated". The analyses involved determining the synchronisation of border policemen firing and Nawara being hit, as provided by two video sequences, resulting in the shooter being positively identified. This was confirmed by the construction of a three-dimensional model of the area and a determination of available lines of sight, additionally confirmed by the video evidence of automatic ejection of the cartridge, which only happens with live ammunition and not with rubber bullets. Still, further confirmation came from the unique sound signature of live ammunition being fired through an M-16 extension meant for rubber bullets, which connected the killing of Nawara and that of Abu Daher.

== Forensic evidence ==
Nuwara's father Siam permitted the exhumation of his son's body, not usual in Islamic practice, to ascertain the truth regarding the projectile that killed his son. He himself was convinced of Israeli military culpability since he had found a bullet in his son's knapsack. An autopsy of the exhumed body was held at the Palestinian Institute of Forensic Medicine in Abu Dis, with Dr. Saber Al-Aloul in charge and with a representative from the Israeli National Institute of Forensic Medicine, plus American, and Danish observer-pathologists in attendance. According to B'Tselem and Palestinian officials, the experts all concluded that Nuwara was shot by a live bullet through his chest “based on the entry and exit wounds in the body, and x-rays that traced [bullet] fragments in the body...They ruled out any other cause of death, rubber bullets or anything else.”

According to one Israeli ballistics expert Dr. Yosef Yekutiel soldiers could not have fired live ammunition because the type of the gun barrel, that was shown on the video, can be used only to fire rubber bullets. This was negated by Forensic Architecture (University of London) which concluded that live ammunition was fired through "an M-16 extension meant for rubber bullets" based on the nature of the cartridge ejection and the sound signature of the fatal shots.

Al-Haq, a Palestinian rights group, said that the Palestinian authorities have not been able to transfer the bullet to Jordan for ballistic analysis because the Israeli military has not given the approval required to take it across the Israeli-controlled border crossing.

In November 2014, contrary to initial claims, the Border Police said that live ammunition had indeed been used.

== Israel investigation and trial of border policeman ==
The Israeli military promised to investigate the incident. One soldier had been suspended on May 28, while the investigation was continuing; Israel stated that there was no proof that his shot was responsible for the death. The IDF stated on the record on 23 May that it would present its preliminary findings on the following Thursday (29 May).

The Israeli army will present its findings on the initial investigation into the deaths of two Palestinians during a May 15 Nakba Day protest to the Chief of General Staff and Defense Minister on Thursday. The report, by the Judea and Samaria Division will attempt to determine whether Border Police troops shot and killed the two men, as the Palestinians claim, while an additional probe by the military police is still underway and may take weeks to complete.

On 11 November 2014, the Judea and Samaria District Police arrested an Israeli border policeman after forensic evidence matched his gun to a bullet found in the backpack of one of the deceased. It was stated that the policeman would be charged with murder. Details of the investigation remained under a gag order. His commanding officer was also arrested on suspicion that he was aware his subordinate had used live ammunition but failed to report it. The commanding officer was released on home arrest.

On 14 December 2014, the Jerusalem District Court cleared for publication the name of the Border Police officer who was identified as Ben Dery.

In December 2016 The Times of Israel reported that Deri (alternative spelling: Dery) had changed his initial claim that he fired only rubber bullets to one in which he admitted firing live rounds at the two teenagers who were some distance away from him. He was also accused of trying to cover up his actions at the time. "The state ... reached an agreement with attorney Tzion Amir which states that the defendant thought he was firing non-lethal rounds of rubber bullets but did not realize at all that there was a live bullet which had fallen into the magazine." As a result, a plea deal was reached in which Deri's charge was to be reduced from murder to that of "wrongful death".

On 25 April 2018, a Jerusalem court found Ben Deri guilty of "causing death by negligence". The presiding judge, Daniel Teperberg, noted that Deri's actions represented “serious and severe harm” to the Israeli social values of “sanctity of life and the human right to wellbeing.” The court noted that:

... the victim, 17-year-old Nadeem Siam Nawara, had previously thrown rocks during a protest, (but that) he was a considerable distance from the demonstration and posed no threat to Deri’s Border Police unit at the time of the shooting. The court said Deri’s apparent mistaken use of live fire required not one, but two acts of negligence. The method used by Border Police to fire large rubber bullets from an M-16 rifle requires the use of an adapter, known as a Roma, which is affixed to the gun’s muzzle. The rubber bullets are placed in the Roma and blank cartridges are loaded into the gun itself. The force of the explosion from the blanks is what propels the rubber bullets. According to the judges, not only was a live round introduced into a magazine that was meant to hold only blanks – the court does not say how or by whom – but Deri failed to notice that fact and failed to load a rubber bullet into the Roma before opening fire. "The defendant did not check that his magazine contained only blanks and did not load a rubber bullet into the Roma as required. These two oversights, which amount to gross negligence, caused the death of the deceased,” the court wrote.

The court sentenced Deri to 9 months in prison.

A second protester, Muhammad Abu Taher, 22, was also shot dead during the same demonstration and a third Palestinian was injured. Police closed those cases due to lack of evidence of wrongdoing.

== Responses ==
- Michael Oren, a former Israeli ambassador to the United States told CNN on 22 May that the manner in which the boys fell was inconsistent with a shooting. Another former Israeli ambassador to the U.S. Danny Ayalon asserted the video was produced by the organization for the “protection of Palestinian children”, and that that group's tax exemption status should be cancelled when the truth of its fabrication is forthcoming.
- Siam Nuwara, father of one of the teenagers killed by live IDF fire, said he could forgive the sniper, perhaps a young man like his son, blaming the officer who would have given him the order to shoot. Speculating that perhaps the Israeli boy was sleepless afterwards, he said: "I [want to] believe that he wanted to pay his respects and offer his condolences and ask forgiveness for what he'd done. ... I know that Israel has law, but when it comes to Palestinians that law is vulnerable. They [the Israeli authorities] can play with the facts." In April 2018, when the border policeman who shot his son with live ammunition was sentenced to 9 months imprisonment, Nawara called the sentence "ridiculous": "This is not how justice is done. I never expected the Israeli court to do justice for my martyred son, but I had to do all I can to present a solid case and to expose the Israeli judicial system before the world and I did." "Today the Israeli court ... proved what we all know, there is no justice under occupation." "... This is a lack of justice that will breed violence."
- Sarah Leah Whitson, Human Rights Watch's Middle East and North Africa director, stated on 9 June, “The willful killing of civilians by Israeli security forces as part of the occupation is a war crime. Israel has a responsibility to prosecute the forces who targeted these teens, and also those responsible for assigning the use of live ammunition to police a demonstration.” HRW's first report on 9 June stated: “The willful killing of civilians by Israeli security forces as part of the occupation is a war crime ... The Israeli military's claim that its forces didn't shoot any live ammunition on May 15 does not stand up to scrutiny. HRW's second on 14 June stated: "A Palestinian autopsy has confirmed that a Palestinian boy killed by Israeli forces during a protest in the West Bank on May 15, 2014, died from injuries caused by live ammunition. ... Israeli authorities are spending more energy trying to discredit the evidence than ending security forces’ unnecessary use of live ammunition during protests against people who pose no threat."
- Amnesty International stated that "The news that two Palestinians were killed during today’s demonstrations is alarming. Israeli forces have repeatedly resorted to extreme violence to respond to Palestinian protests against Israel’s occupation, discriminatory policies, confiscation of land and construction of unlawful settlements ... Amnesty International is calling for a prompt, independent, and transparent investigation into these deaths and injuries".

== Aftermath ==
Thousands attended the funeral march for the two Palestinian teenagers, waving flags for both Hamas and Fatah, the two largest Palestinian political parties, and calling for "revenge for the blood of the martyrs."

Three days after the release of the autopsy findings on 9 June, confirming that live ammunition had killed the two Palestinian teenagers, three Israeli teenagers were abducted on 12 June and murdered soon afterwards, followed by the kidnapping and murder of Mohammed Abu Khdeir, another Palestinian teenager.

Western and Israeli media representation was different in the treatment of the deaths of the Palestinian teenagers compared to those of the three Israeli teenagers.

On the NBC show, All In with Chris Hayes, NBC Middle East news correspondent Ayman Mohyeldin raised the issue of the “departure point” of the subsequent major 2014 period of conflict epitomised by Operation Protective Edge in which over 2200 citizens of Gaza were killed. He questioned the uniqueness of the widely held view that the conflict necessarily started with the abduction of three Israeli teenagers. Rachel Shabi of Al Jazeera echoed the validity of earlier events as a trigger option: "Why not wind back, for instance, to the two Palestinian teenagers ... killed by Israeli snipers on Naqba day in May?", as did Christine Leuenberger – "Palestinians point to another trigger – the killing of two Palestinian teenagers during the Nakba commemoration day on May 15." Israeli historian Ilan Pappé observed, "The killing of three Israeli teenagers, two of them minors, abducted in the occupied West Bank in June, which was mainly a reprisal for (the Beitunia) killings of Palestinian children in May ...".

In 2015 Alareer and El-Haddad published a Palestinian perspective on the 2014 Operation Protective Edge tragedy. In it they criticise the mainstream Western media's predominant view that the operation and its precursors were the results only of the kidnapping of three Israeli settler teenagers, citing solidarity protests for hunger-striking Palestinians being held on administrative detention in Ofer (prison) and killings of Palestinians prior to the murder of three Israeli teenagers. They favourably quote Mouin Rabbani, a director of the Palestine American Research Center, who wrote, "The current round of escalation is generally dated from the moment three Israeli youths went missing on 12 June. Two Palestinian boys were shot dead in Ramallah on 15 May, but that – like any number of incidents in the intervening month when Israel exercised its right to colonise and dispossess – is considered insignificant (by Western media)", an approach that he describes as 'tribal'.

In June 2015 Congresswoman Betty McCollum called on U.S. State Department officials to investigate whether the killing of the two Palestinian teenagers by Israeli soldiers required the withholding of U.S. military aid.

== See also ==
- IDF admissions to misconduct after initial denials
- Timeline of the 2014 Gaza War
