= Killing of Yaron Chen =

1993 killing of an Israeli soldier by Hamas militants

Abduction and killing of Yaron Chen
- Native name: חטיפת ירון חן ורציחתו
- Location: Rama intersection near Ramallah, West Bank
- Date: August 5, 1993; 33 years ago
- Attack type: Abduction, Shooting attack
- Deaths: 1 Israeli soldier (Yaron Chen)
- Perpetrator: Hamas claimed responsibility

On August 5, 1993, Hamas militants abducted and later killed Israeli soldier Yaron Chen.

== The attack ==
On Thursday, August 5, 1993, the 20-year-old private Yaron Chen, who was on his way home from a military base, was hitchhiking at the Rama intersection near East Jerusalem. Chen was picked up by a white Fiat van with an Israeli license plate. Another soldier reported seeing Chen struggling with three Palestinians who drove a white Fiat car.

Chen was shot dead shortly afterwards while struggling with his abductors.

Hamas publicized its abduction and killing of Chen. Chen's body was found before dawn in the burnt-out charred white Fiat van in the village of Beitunia in the West Bank.

== Conviction of assailant; release in Shalit exchange ==
Fahed Sabri Barhan al-Shaludi was originally sentenced to a life sentence. On October 18, 2011, he was released to Gaza as part of the Gilad Shalit prisoner exchange between Israel and Hamas.

== See also ==
- 2014 kidnapping and murder of Israeli teenagers, by Hamas
- Abduction and killing of Nachshon Wachsman, by Hamas
- Kidnapping and murder of Avi Sasportas and Ilan Saadon, by Hamas
- Kidnapping and murder of Nissim Toledano, by Hamas
- List of kidnappings
- List of solved missing person cases: 1950–1999
