= Abduction and killing of Nachshon Wachsman =

1994 incident in the Israeli–Palestinian conflict

Abduction of Nachson Wachsman
- Type: Abduction and rescue attempt
- Locations: Bnei Atarot junction, Israel (abduction); Bir Nabala, West Bank, Palestine (rescue attempt)
- Planned by: Hamas
- Commanded by: Mohammed Deif (abduction)
- Objective: Release of Palestinian prisoners in Israel
- Date: October 9, 1994 (abduction), October 14 (rescue attempt)
- Casualties: Nachshon Wachsman, Nir Poraz and 3 Palestinian militants killed 9 Israeli commandos injured

The abduction and killing of Nachshon Wachsman (Hebrew: נחשון וקסמן) was a 1994 incident in which Palestinian Hamas abducted Israeli soldier Nachshon Wachsman from the Bnei Atarot junction in central Israel, and held him hostage for six days. The incident ended in a failed Israeli rescue attempt, during which Wachsman, three of his captors and an Israeli officer were killed.

== Background ==
In 1994, Hamas tried to disrupt the peace process between Israel and the Palestinians which it opposed by carrying out a series of suicide bombings.

== Abduction ==
At home on a leave, Wachsman was instructed by the military to attend a one-day training course in northern Israel. He left Saturday night after Shabbat, telling his parents he would return Sunday night, October 9, 1994. He was last seen by a friend who reported that, after completing the training, Wachsman had been dropped off at the Bnei Atarot junction, a densely populated area in central Israel, where he could either catch a bus or hitchhike, a common practice of Israeli soldiers, to Jerusalem.

Israeli intelligence learned that Wachsman entered a car in which there were Hamas militants wearing kippot, who had a Tanakh and siddur on the dashboard, and Chassidic music playing.

=== Hostage tape ===
On October 11, 1994, a videotape was broadcast showing Wachsman, with his hands and feet bound, before a keffiyeh-covered militant who was displaying Wachsman's identity card. After the militant recited the hostage's home address and identity number, Wachsman spoke, with the armed militant behind him, saying:

The group from Hamas kidnapped me. They are demanding the release of Sheikh Ahmed Yassin and another 200 from Israeli prison. If their demands are not met, they will execute me on Friday at 8 P.M."

Sheikh Ahmed Yassin was Hamas leader at the time and had been imprisoned by Israel since 1989. In response to the tape, Nachshon's parents pleaded with world leaders, including Israeli Prime Minister Yitzhak Rabin, US President Bill Clinton, and Muslim religious leaders.

== Search and rescue attempt ==
Rabin sealed Gaza, mistakenly believing that Wachsman had been taken there. The move cut off tens of thousands of Palestinian laborers from their jobs in Israel. He also called Yasser Arafat on the telephone and placed full responsibility for Wachsman's well-being on his shoulders. Arafat responded by denouncing the abduction of Wachsman as an attempt to "embarrass" the Palestinian Authority (PA). A senior PA official commented that "the PA is committed to undertaking every possible effort to find Wachsman, because his abduction is a personal affront to Yassir Arafat." Over the next few days Arafat's PA security forces began cracking down and arresting dozens of Hamas officials and stopping Hamas demonstrations. Over 200 Hamas members were arrested.

Eventually the Israeli secret police, Shin Bet, captured Jihad Yarmur, the driver of the car that had picked up Wachsman. Interrogating Yarmur, they learned that Wachsman was being held in the village of Bir Nabala, a location under Israeli control located only ten minutes away from Wachsman's home in the Ramot neighborhood of Jerusalem. Rabin authorized a military rescue attempt.

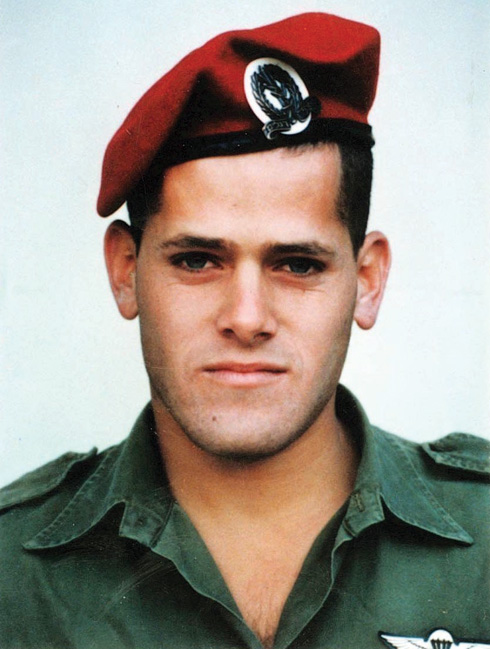
Captain Nir Poraz was killed during the failed rescue mission

At 20:00 that night, at the hour of the ultimatum, elite IDF commandos from the Sayeret Matkal special forces unit carried out an operation to free Wachsman. It was thought that Wachsman was being held behind an iron door, but in fact it was a solid steel door, and the first explosion only dented the door. The commandos immediately lost the element of surprise, giving Wachsman's captors inside time to shoot him dead and position themselves for the impending firefight. A second explosive charge was prepared and the door was finally blasted open after more than a minute, and after a heavy exchange of fire with gunmen waiting on the stairwell, the commandos reached a second iron door, and had to wait another four minutes for the charges to be set. During this time, the commandos shouted to the gunmen inside to surrender, while the gunmen replied that Wachsman was already dead and that they preferred to die. After the team broke through the door, another exchange of fire took place before the room was secured. In total, three gunmen were killed and two taken prisoner, while the leader of the commando team, 23-year-old Captain Nir Poraz was killed and nine commandos were wounded. Wachsman was found dead in the room. His body was slumped in a chair, wearing a kafiyeh and civilian clothes. He had been shot in the throat and chest at close range. The Wachsman family was informed of his death personally by General Yoram Yair.

== Aftermath ==
In a news conference a few hours after the failed rescue attempt, Rabin, who had authorized it, took full responsibility for it and sent his condolences to the Wachsman and Poraz families. He justified his decision by stating that Israel should do no less than what it expected the PA to do:

"I could not conceive that we would not do what I believe the State of Israel in its war against terror must do; what we actually demanded of the PA and of Arafat, in his capacity as its chairman, during the last week, when the reports were that Wachsman was in the Gaza Strip. Therefore, this is a policy of fighting terror to the bitter end."

Israeli leaders commended Arafat and the PA for their cooperation in trying to locate Wachsman and praised its work. Peres stated in a televised speech on the night of Wachsman's funeral that

"it's clear Hamas is against the two of us [Israel and the PA] because the two of us are for peace... Over the last two or three days I believe that Mr. Arafat and the Palestinian Authority did show a readiness to counteract the danger of Hamas."

Environment Minister Yossi Sarid, referring to the PAs crackdown on Hamas, commented that "in the last few days the Palestinian Authority in Gaza has made considerable efforts." Even Israeli hawks such as Gideon Ezra admitted to being impressed by Palestinian Security Chief Jibril Rajoub even as he remained wary of him.

On October 20, senior Hamas leader Imad Falouji declared that Hamas would continue fighting until Israel withdrew from the West Bank and Gaza Strip. Days later, however, Hamas offered Israel a ceasefire.

The abduction caused the PA to clamp down on Hamas military activity with Israeli cooperation. In early 1995, more than a hundred Islamic militants were arrested.

== Nachson Wachsman ==
Nachshon Wachsman
- נחשון וקסמן
- Born: Nachshon Mordechai Wachsman; March 3, 1975; Jerusalem, Israel
- Died: October 14, 1994 (aged 19); Bir Nabala, north of Jerusalem
- Military career
- Allegiance: Israel
- Branch: Israeli Army
- Service years: August 1993 – October 14, 1994
- Rank: Sergeant (promoted posthumously)
- Unit: Golani Brigade
- Conflicts: Combat in the Israeli Security Zone during the South Lebanon conflict

Sergeant Nachshon Mordechai Wachsman (Hebrew: נחשון מרדכי וקסמן, born April 3, 1975, died October 14, 1994) was an IDF soldier who was abducted and held hostage by Hamas for a period of 6 days.

A dual citizen of Israel and the United States, Wachsman was raised in Jerusalem. He was the third of seven sons born to Yehuda and Esther Wachsman. His father was Israeli-born, while his mother was born in a German displaced persons camp and immigrated to Israel from Brooklyn. Wachsman volunteered for an elite commando unit of the Golani Brigade, serving in the Orev Golani.

=== Funeral ===
Wachsman was buried on Saturday night October 15, 1994 in the Mount Herzl military cemetery.

Wachsman's Rosh Yeshiva, Rabbi Mordechai Elon, gave his eulogy. At the request of Wachsman's bereaved father, the rabbi told the crowd of mourners that God did listen to their prayers, and that just as a father would always like to say "yes" to all of his children's requests, sometimes he must say "no" though the child might not understand why. "So too our Father in Heaven heard our prayers, and though we don't understand why, His answer was 'no.'"

=== Beit Nachshon ===
Today "Beit Nachshon" at the SHALVA Center in Jerusalem, an association for mentally and physically challenged children, is dedicated to Wachsman's memory.

== Jihad Yarmur ==
Jihad Yarmur was convicted of the killing of Nachshon Wachsman. He was released in October 2011 as one of 1,027 prisoners exchanged for captive Israeli soldier Gilad Shalit.

== See also ==
- 2006 Gaza cross-border raid
- 2014 kidnapping and murder of Israeli teenagers
- Abduction and killing of Nissim Toledano
- Abduction and killing of Yaron Chen
- Killing of Avi Sasportas and Ilan Saadon
- List of kidnappings
