= Liftershalte =

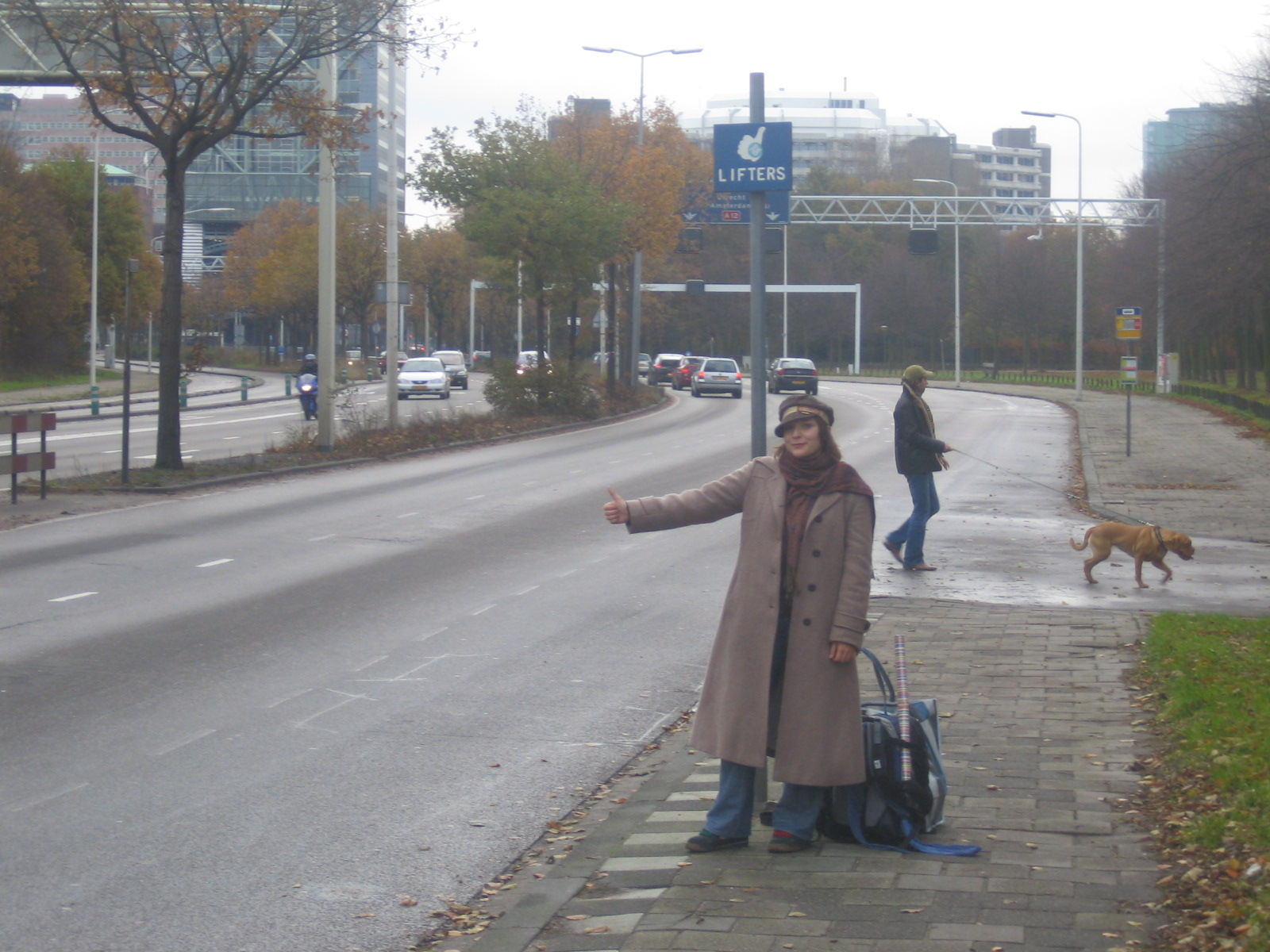
Girl hitchhiking at the liftershalte of The Hague

A liftershalte or liftplaats (in the Dutch language) is a spot (halte means stop, like in bushalte), marked by an official sign, where a hitchhiker (lifter) can easily be picked up by car drivers. In the Netherlands these spots can be found at the following cities (2024):

- Amsterdam: at the Prins Bernhardplein before NS Station Amsterdam Amstel (pass the bus stop), road that leads to the ramp of the S112 of the A10. (direction A1 and A2).
- Groningen: at the Emmaviaduct, the road to the A28, 200 meter westwards of the Centraal Station (richting Assen) and at the Europaweg at the crossing with the Damsterdiep (direction Germany).
- Maastricht: at the Stadionplein in front of football stadium De Geusselt. This liftershalte is situated on a parking area and is therefore not suitable for hitching a good ride from passing drivers.
- Nijmegen: Just after the Keizer Traianus plein, before the bridge over the Waal, in the direction of Arnhem. And on the Graafseweg just after the Keizer Karel plein, in the direction of 's-Hertogenbosch.
- The Hague: On Boslaan, next to Malieveld, the beginning of the A12 (direction Utrecht). Reopened in 2024.
- Utrecht ramp of the Waterlinieweg near Galgenwaard stadium (north-bound A27 and A28 and south-bound A12, A2 and A27).
- Zoetermeer: at the bus stop Pruimengaarde on the Australieweg. Combined bus stop/hitchhiking spot eastwards A12 to Utrecht. And at the bus stop Fonteinbos on the Afrikaweg. Combined bus stop/hitchhiking spot directions The Hague, Rotterdam, Delft.

Local liftershaltes are situated in the provinces Flevoland in Zeewolde, Friesland in Heeg, Sneek, Langweer en Sint Nicolaasga and in North-Brabant in Hoogeloon, Hulsel, Luyksgestel, Knegsel en Weebosch.

In the past there were also liftershaltes in:

- Amsterdam: N200 direction Haarlem
- Enschede: on Westerval, at the Parkweg (direction A1), receded 2006.
- Leeuwarden: reportedly had an official hitch-hiking spot
- Maastricht: at the beginning of the A2 near the soccer stadium De Geusselt situated on a very good location to hitchhike to (Viaductweg x N2/A2) (direction Eindhoven) and the A79 (direction Heerlen), receded in 2012.
