= Qawasameh tribe =

Qawasameh tribe (Arabic: القواسمة, also spelled: Qawasmeh or Kawasmeh in English), is a major clan primarily based in Hebron, with roughly 10,000 members. Although many of the Qawasmeh were originally pro-peace moderates and supporters of a two-state solution, they were radicalised. One tribe faction, numbering several hundred, dominates Hamas' branch in Hebron and is a radical opposition faction within Hamas, which frequently sabotages Hamas cease fires with bombings and attacks, provoking Israeli retaliation.

The Shin Bet has accused them of kidnapping the Yeshiva students. Marwan Qawasameh is suspected of being one of two terrorists involved in the kidnapping and murder of three Israeli teens on June 12, 2014.

According to the IDF, Abbedalla Qawasameh was killed in June 2003 by the Yamam elite CT unit after resisting an arrest. He opened fire on the Yamam officers who returned fire and killed him. According to Palestinian witnesses, however, a squad of Israeli police disguised as Palestinian labourers opened fire on him as he left a Hebron mosque. The controversial assassination led to criticism of Israel from U.S. Secretary of State Colin Powell.

On August 31, 2004, Ahmed Abed Qawasameh, a resident of the Hebron District, blew himself up in a suicide bombing attack at Beersheba, which claimed the lives of 16 Israeli civilians. He was sent by the local Hamas leader Imad Qawasameh.

On October 13, 2004, Imad Qawasameh was arrested by IDF forces, after intelligence was provided by the Shin Bet. According to witnesses, Imad surrendered immediately after an IDF Caterpillar D9 armoured bulldozer started to demolish his house.

In 2011, the IDF broke into Omar Qawasameh's home, put a gun to his wife's head and shot him dead in his sleep. Subsequently, the Israeli army released a statement acknowledging the Qawasameh killing was unintended. An Israeli military spokesman told the AFP news agency: "There is no indication that [al-Qawasmeh] was involved in any terror activity at any stage and therefore we regret the incident."

The Qawasameh extremist wing are the main suppliers of militants to the Hebron cells of Hamas.

== Notable Qawasameh Hamas members ==
- Fahd Qawasmi (mayor of Hebron, PLO Executive committee member, deceased)
- Hamza Qawasameh (killed Netanel Uzari, deceased)
- Marwan Qawasameh (suspected of being one of two terrorists involved in the kidnapping and murder of three Israeli teens, deceased)
- Raad Misk Qawasameh (suicide bomber, deceased)
- Abbedalla Qawasameh (leader, deceased)
- Bassal Qawasameh (leader, deceased)
- Ahmed Abed Qawasameh (suicide bomber in Beersheba, deceased)
- Imad Qawasameh (leader, arrested October 13, 2004)
