= Killing of Avi Sasportas and Ilan Saadon =

1989 deadly abductions by Hamas

Abduction and killing of Avi Sasportas and Ilan Saadon
- Location: Southern District
- Date: May 3, 1989
- Deaths: Israeli soldiers Avi Sasportas and Ilan Saadon
- Perpetrator: Hamas militant squad

The killing of Avi Sasportas and Ilan Saadon refers to two Israeli soldiers abducted by Hamas on February 16 and May 3, 1989, and subsequently killed. They were the first victims of the newly founded Palestinian militant organization. Ilan Saadon's body was found in 1996.

== Background ==
In December 1987, with the beginning of the first intifada, Hamas was founded by Muslim Brotherhood members and was headed by Sheikh Ahmed Yassin and Mohammad Taha. Hamas sent out feelers, via talks with Shimon Peres, in early 1988 offering an acknowledgement of Israel in exchange for a return to the 1967 borders, but soon discarded negotiations in favour of armed resistance, to clearly demarcate the difference between its position and that of Palestinian nationalists. Since the leaders of Majd, Hamas's internal security service, Salah Shehade and Yahya Sinwar, were detained in prison, Hamas set up a new structure, called Unit 101, headed by Mahmoud al-Mabhouh, whose function was to abduct Israeli soldiers.

Unit 101's operations were headed by Mohammed Youssef al-Sharatha. The other squad members were Abed Rabo Abu Jose, co-founder of Hamas' military wing, Muhammad Nazim Nasser.

== Avi Sasportas ==
Sergeant Avi Sasportas was born and raised in the city of Ashdod, where he lived. In his youth he volunteered in the BBYO youth movement and in the Civil Guard. In November 1986, Sasportas joined the IDF and was assigned to the Israeli Special Forces unit Maglan.

On February 16, 1989, Sasportas got in a vehicle carrying two Hamas militants disguised as Israeli Jewish ultra-orthodox men, who beat him to death shortly thereafter. On May 7, 1989, Avi Sasportas' body was found buried in a field, near the site at which he had been abducted, during search operations for Ilan Saadoun. He was buried soon thereafter in a military cemetery in Ashdod.

== Ilan Saadon ==
Corporal Ilan Saadoun was born and raised in the city of Ashkelon. Three months after his recruitment he was assigned to the Armored Corps Memorial Site and Museum at Latrun, where he performed various jobs.

On May 3, 1989, Saadoun was given a leave of absence from the military. Saadoun and a friend of his made their way back home, hitchhiking from Latrun, and they arrived together at the Masmiya intersection. At 19:30 a white Subaru car with Israeli license plates stopped at a hitchhiking stop. Mahmoud Naser and Mohammad sat in the vehicle, disguised as Israeli Jewish ultra orthodox men, and invited the soldiers to join them on a ride towards Ashkelon. Only Saadoun got in the car, since the back seat was loaded with equipment and therefore only one additional passenger could fit in the car.

The hijackers initially planned to drive Saadon to the Jabaliya refugee camp in Gaza. After seeing an IDF patrol on their way, they changed their direction, and drove towards Palmachim. During the ride the captors struggled with Saadoun, and shot him in the head. The attackers buried Saadon's body in the Palmachim scrap site.

=== Searches ===
On May 5, two days after the killing, Saadon was declared absent. That same day, the white Subaru was found abandoned in an orchard near Beit Lahiya. Investigators discovered a large blood stain in the car, as well as Saadon's fingerprints. As a result, extensive searches were conducted, but they produced nothing. A month later the searches were halted.

A month after the abduction, a large campaign of arrests was conducted by the Israel Defense Forces in the Gaza Strip. Among the 650 Hamas members that were arrested was the squad commander, Mohammed Youssef al-Sharatha. During their interrogation, al-Sharatha and Ahmed Yassin claimed they did not know where Saadoun's body was buried. Yassin denied all involvement, stating he had only authorized the killing of collaborators with Israel. He had refused prisoner exchanges with Israel, a point that may have contributed to the execution of the two Israeli soldiers.

The other squad members were able to flee the country, carrying with them several personal items belonging to Saadoun. The three passed through the Rafah crossing into Egypt. From there, Nasser and al-Mabhouh continued to Dubai.

During the following years, whenever new bits of information or speculations were revealed, targeted searches were conducted with the aim of finding Saadoun's body. Through the years, Saadon's family members independently conducted searches for his body. Saadon's family members even visited Yassin in an Israeli prison, in an attempt to obtain new information on the whereabouts of Ilan Saadon. Over the years there were various allegations made by various organizations claiming that they were holding Saadon alive, and that he would be returned in exchange for the release of Palestinian prisoners – these organizations even presented the dog tag of Saadon as evidence. These claims turned out eventually to be false.

After the Oslo Accords, PA officials attempted to locate the burial place of Ilan Saadon's body. In the Spring of 1996, Muhammad Nasser drew two maps that led Israeli investigators to Saadon's grave. The information was passed through to the Israeli investigators through PA leader Yasser Arafat. According to maps, Saadoun was buried in the Palmahim area, between the Park-Rave Interchange and moshav Gan Sorek. In the seven years that had passed since his killing, major construction had taken place in that area.

The investigators team compared the maps drawn, with aerial photos taken during the period of the killing, and managed to mark a number of possible sites in which Saadon may have been buried. The first excavations did not produce anything, and the only site that had been left unchecked was a site which was now covered with a newly paved road.

The team was assisted by additional photographs, advanced instruments, and interviews with designers and builders of the road, and managed to establish a new approximate location of the burial site of Ilan Saadon. To make it possible to conduct excavations on the road section, a new road was paved to bypass around the target section. After over a month of carefully conducted excavations, at noon of August 11, 1996, the remains of Ilan Saadon were found.

Saadon's funeral was held on August 12, 1996. He was buried at the military cemetery in Ashkelon.

== Aftermath ==
Ahmed Yassin was arrested by the Israeli forces shortly after the abduction of Ilan Saadon, and convicted of offenses related to the abductions and killings of Sasportas and Saadoun. He was sentenced to life imprisonment and an additional 15 years' imprisonment. In 1997 Yassin was released from Israeli prison as part of an arrangement with Jordan following the failed assassination attempt of Khaled Mashal.

Immediately after his release from Israeli prison, Yassin resumed his calls for attacks on Israel, using tactics including suicide bombings, violating the condition of his release.

Salah Shehadeh was released from Israeli prison in 2000, and became the commander of the Hamas military wing in Gaza. On July 22, 2002, Shehadeh was killed in an Israeli targeted killing in which an Israel F-16 bombed his house, located in a residential neighborhood in Gaza. Shehadeh was killed together with his assistant and another 14 people, including his wife and one of his daughters.

Mohammed Youssef al-Sharatha, the commander of the militant squad, was caught a month after the abduction and was sentenced to life imprisonment. Over the years, Hamas sought to obtain his release in a prisoner swap deal in return for Gilad Shalit. The family of Ilan Saadon expressed strong opposition to this option, but he was released on October 18, 2011, as part of the Gilad Shalit prisoner swap deal.

On November 19, 2001, a Golani Brigade force captured squad member Abed-Rabo Abu Jose in the Sg'aih neighborhood in Gaza.

Squad member Mahmoud al-Mabhouh was killed in Dubai on January 20, 2010. The assassination is believed to be the work of the Israeli Mossad intelligence service. According to a Hamas statement, Al-Mabhouh had been involved in the 1989 abduction and killing of two Israeli soldiers, Avi Sasportas and Ilan Sa'adon, whose murders he celebrated by standing on one of their corpses. In a video taped two weeks before his death, and broadcast on Al-Jazeera in early February 2010, Mabhouh admitted his involvement, saying he had disguised himself as an Orthodox Jew.

== See also ==
- Abduction and killing of Yaron Chen, by Hamas
- Abduction and killing of Nissim Toledano, by Hamas
- Abduction and killing of Nachshon Wachsman, by Hamas
- List of kidnappings
- List of solved missing person cases: 1950–1999

== Notes and references ==
=== Bibliography ===
- Filiu, Jean-Pierre (2014). Gaza: A History. Oxford University Press. pp. 207–. ISBN 978-0-19-020189-0.
- Darshan-Leitner, Nitsana; Katz, Samuel M. (November 7, 2017). Harpoon: Inside the Covert War Against Terrorism's Money Masters. Hachette Books. pp. 281–. ISBN 978-0-316-39902-9.
