= Beta Israel =

Jewish community associated with modern-day Ethiopia

Hebrew: בֵּיתֶא יִשְׂרָאֵל; Ge'ez: ቤተ እስራኤል

Total population
- 173,500

Regions with significant populations
- Israel: 160,500 (2021)
- Ethiopia: 12,000 (2021)
- United States: 1,000 (2008)

Languages
- Predominant: Amharic, Modern Hebrew, Tigrinya; Historical: Agaw languages (Kayla, Qwara), Ethiosemitic languages (Geʽez), Jewish languages (Biblical Hebrew, Aramaic)

Religion
- Majority: Judaism (Haymanot); Minority: Christianity (Crypto-Judaism) (Note: The Falash Mura are of the Jewish ethnicity, but left the Jewish religion to become Christians (both voluntarily and involuntarily) around the 19th century. However, Israeli officials have said that the community reverted to Judaism upon immigrating to Israel. The Beta Abraham is similar to the Falash Mura but continued to secretly practice Judaism after nominally converting to Christianity. Both communities are regarded as part of the Beta Israel.)

Related ethnic groups
- Other Jews (i.e., Jewish diaspora and Jewish Israelis), Habesha peoples, Agaw peoples

The Beta Israel, (Note: (Hebrew: בֵּיתֶא יִשְׂרָאֵל, romanized: Bēteʾ Yīsrāʾēl; Ge'ez: ቤተ እስራኤል, romanized: Beta ʾƏsrāʾel, modern: Bēte 'Isrā'ēl, EAe: Betä Ǝsraʾel; Amharic: ቤተ እስራኤል, romanized: Betä ʾEsraʾel, lit. 'House of Israel' or 'Community of Israel')) or Ethiopian Jews, (Note: (Hebrew: יְהוּדֵי אֶתְיוֹפְּיָה, romanized: Yĕhûdê ʾEṯyôpĭyâ; Amharic: የኢትዮጵያ ይሁዲዎች, romanized: YaʾItyôp̣yâ Yĕhûdîwôtš, lit. 'Jews of Ethiopia') are a Jewish group originating in the Amhara and Tigray regions of northern Ethiopia, where they historically inhabited more than 500 small villages. The majority are concentrated in what is today North Gondar Zone, Shire Inda Selassie, Welkait, Tselemti, Dembia, Segelt, Qwara Province, and Belesa. Since their official recognition as Jewish under Israel's Law of Return, most of the Beta Israel have made aliyah from Ethiopia to Israel through several Israeli government initiatives starting in 1979.

The history behind the ethnogenesis of the Beta Israel is a matter of dispute. They appear to have been lastingly isolated from broader Jewish communities, having historically practiced a divergent, non-Talmudic form of Judaism, known as Haymanot, that is similar in some respects to Karaite Judaism. Genetic studies show them to cluster closely with non-Jewish Amharas and Tigrayans, with no indications of maternal gene flow with Yemenite Jews in spite of their geographic proximity.

The community suffered extensive destruction in the 19th century due to the Mahdist War, as well as persecution by the Ethiopian Empire. In response to these pressures, and influenced by the efforts of Protestant and Messianic missionaries, a portion of the community converted to Christianity. These converts became known as the Falash Mura. The Beta Abraham community is considered by some to be a crypto-Judaic branch of the Beta Israel.

The Beta Israel first made extensive contact with other Jewish communities in the early 20th century, after which a comprehensive rabbinic debate ensued over whether they are to be considered Jewish. Following halakhic and constitutional discussions, Israeli authorities decided in 1977 that the Beta Israel qualified on all fronts for the Israeli Law of Return. Thus, the Israeli government, with support from the United States, began a large-scale effort to conduct transport operations and bring the Beta Israel to Israel in multiple waves. These activities included Operation Brothers, which evacuated the Beta Israel community in Sudan between 1979 and 1990 (including Operation Moses in 1984 and Operation Joshua in 1985), and Operation Solomon in 1991. At the end of 2019, there were 155,300 Ethiopian Jews in Israel. Approximately 87,500 were born in Ethiopia, and 67,800 were born in Israel to Ethiopian-born parents. The community in Israel is mostly composed of Beta Israel (practicing both Haymanot and Rabbinic Judaism), but also includes smaller numbers of Falash Mura who left Christianity and began practicing Rabbinic Judaism following their immigration to the country.

== Terminology ==
The Beta Israel community, (literally, the 'house of Israel' in Ge'ez), has been known by several names throughout its history.

The local populace called them the Esraelawi (Israelites), Yehudi or Ayhud.

However, the name Ayhud (lit. the "Jewish people") is rarely used by the Beta Israel community, because in the past, Ethiopian Christians used it as a derogatory term. The usage of the term increased during the 20th century as the Beta Israel strengthened its ties with other Jewish communities.

Within the community, the term Ibrawi (lit. "Hebrew") was used in reference to the chawa (lit. "free man," see Chewa regiments) in the community, in contrast to the barya (lit. "slave").

The colloquial Ethiopian/Eritrean term Falasha or Felasha, which means "landless", "wanderers", or "exiles", was given to the community in the 15th century by the Emperor Yeshaq I; after they were conquered by the Ethiopian Empire, its use is now considered offensive, though initially it may have not been considered derogatory. The term appears in Jewish texts in the 15th century (Hebrew: פֶלַאשַה).

Other terms which have been less-frequently used in reference to the community include Tebiban ("possessor of secret knowledge").

== Geography ==
Prior to the large-scale emigration of the community to Israel, they were primarily located in the northwestern regions of Ethiopia, historically known as Abyssinia. The majority of the community lived in areas such as the Semien Mountains, Begemder, Tsegede, Wolqayt, Tselemti, Dembiya, and Segelt. Smaller groups also resided in the Shewa region, including Addis Ababa, and in parts of Eritrea, particularly Asmara. The settlements were situated along the tributaries of the Tekezé River and near Lake Tana, the source of the Blue Nile. This area included the Simien Mountains, which includes Ras Dashen, the highest peak in Ethiopia- reaching an elevation of 4,549 meters. While the high-altitude terrain above 3,000 meters provided strategic advantages for defense and served as natural fortifications, it was difficult for farming due to thin, rocky soil and steep slopes. The mountain air in these highlands, known locally as Dega, is regarded as conducive to good health, longevity, and physical vitality.

The communal settlements were typically situated near streams, rivers, and mountainous areas, often at elevations of 2,000 to 3,000 meters above sea level, within a climate zone called Waina Dega (meaning "Vineland" in Amharic). This zone has a temperate climate with average temperatures ranging between 2.5 °C and 18 °C. The region receives significant rainfall, averaging around 1,550 millimeters annually, with two distinct rainy seasons. The area also benefits from fertile soil, making it suitable for agriculture, although the steep, rocky terrain at higher elevations, like those found in the Simien Mountains, can present challenges for farming.

Beta Israel communities typically avoided lowland areas (below 2,000 meters), known as Kolla, due to the risks posed by tropical diseases like Malaria, parasites, and dangerous wildlife and the threat posed by potentially hostile neighboring tribes. However, during waves of emigration to Israel, members of the community were forced to cross hazardous lowland regions, this journey entailed significant hardship, and thousands perished, particularly during prolonged periods of waiting in refugee camps located in the Sudanese desert and in Addis Ababa.

== Origins ==
=== Tradition ===
There are numerous accounts and traditions concerning the arrival of Jews in Ethiopia. According to the main account of origin, the community descends from an ancient migration of the Tribe of Dan, when the Brothers war occurred, Jeroboam II, demanded that the Tribe of Dan was forced to fight to the Tribe of Judah, in which they refused and migrated to Ethiopia via Egypt. According to The Geon, Tzemach Gaon, the tribe of Dan migrated to Ethiopia 135 years before the destruction of the Solomon's Temple.

Axumite legends suggests that the Beta Israel are descended from emissaries sent by King Solomon to the Queen of Sheba, rather than from contemporaneous figures. However, the Beta Israel themselves reject the national history. Menachem Waldeman, a prominent researcher of the Beta Israel, identifies four origin stories among them, all of which trace their ancestry to the Tribe of Dan which migrated through Egypt.

The Hebrew Bible makes several references to the presence of Jews in the Land of Kush [Modern day Ethiopia and Sudan], and includes prophetic passages regarding their settlement in the area after the dispersion of the Israelites, and their redemption in the regathering. These references appear notably in the prophetic texts of the Book of Isaiah and the Book of Zephaniah. For example, in the Book of Isaiah, chapter 11, verse 11:

And it shall come to pass in that day, that the LORD shall set his hand again the second time to recover the remnant of his people, which shall be left, from Assyria, and from Egypt, and from Pathros, and from Cush, and from Elam, and from Shinar, and from Hamath, and from the islands of the sea.

The prophet Zephaniah prophesied after the destruction of the First temple that offerings of sacrifices will continue to be offered by Israelites across the River Kush (modern-day Ethiopia) in the Book of Zephaniah, chapter 3, verse 10:

From across the River Cush, my servants, daughters of my dispersed ones, will bring me my offering.

It seems that during the time of Isaiah and Zephaniah in the 8th and 7th centuries BCE, a Jewish community existed in these areas.

=== Scholarly views ===
==== Early views ====
Early secular scholars considered the Beta Israel to be the direct descendants of Jews who lived in ancient Ethiopia, whether they were the descendants of an Israelite tribe, or converted by Jews living in Yemen, or by the Jewish community in southern Egypt at Elephantine. In 1829, Marcus Louis wrote that the ancestors of the Beta Israel related to the Asmach, which were also called Sembritae ("foreigners"), an Egyptian regiment numbering 240,000 soldiers and mentioned by Greek geographers and historians. The Asmach emigrated or were exiled from Elephantine to Kush in the time of Psamtik I or Psamtik II and settled in Sennar and Abyssinia. It is possible that Shebna's party from Rabbinic accounts was part of the Asmach.

In the 1930s, Jones and Monroe argued that the chief Semitic languages of Ethiopia may suggest an antiquity of Judaism in Ethiopia: "There still remains the curious circumstance that a number of Abyssinian words connected with religion, such as the words for Hell, idol, Easter, purification, and alms, are of Hebrew origin. These words must have been derived directly from a Jewish source, for the Abyssinian Church knows the scriptures only in a Ge'ez version made from the Septuagint."

Richard Pankhurst summarized the various theories offered about their origins, as of 1950. He said that the first members of this community were:

1. converted Agaws
2. Jewish immigrants who intermarried with Agaws
3. immigrant Yemeni Arabs who had converted to Judaism
4. immigrant Yemeni Jews
5. Jews from Egypt
6. successive waves of Yemeni Jews

According to Pankhurst, traditional Ethiopian scholars have said "We were Jews before we were Christians". He said that more recent hypotheses were more compelling—especially those of the Ethiopian scholars Dr Taddesse Tamrat and Dr Getachew Haile—and instead emphasized the conversion of Christians to the Beta Israel faith, suggesting the Beta Israel were culturally and ethnically an Ethiopian sect.

==== 1980s and early 1990s ====
According to Jacqueline Pirenne, numerous Sabaeans left southern Arabia and crossed over the Red Sea to Ethiopia to escape from the Assyrians, who had devastated the kingdoms of Israel and Judah in the 8th and 7th centuries BCE. She says that a second major wave of Sabeans crossed over to Ethiopia in the 6th and 5th centuries BCE to escape Nebuchadnezzar II, and that this wave also included Jews fleeing from the Babylonian takeover of Judah. In both cases, the Sabeans are assumed to have departed later from Ethiopia to Yemen.

According to Menachem Waldman, a major wave of emigration from the Kingdom of Judah to Kush and Abyssinia dates to the Assyrian siege of Jerusalem in the beginning of the seventh century BCE. Rabbinic accounts of the siege assert that only about 110,000 Judeans remained in Jerusalem under King Hezekiah's command, whereas about 130,000 Judeans led by Shebna had joined Sennacherib's campaign against Tirhakah, king of Kush. Sennacherib's campaign failed and Shebna's army was lost "at the mountains of darkness", suggestively identified with the Simien Mountains.

In 1987, Steven Kaplan wrote:

Although we don't have a single fine ethnographic research on Beta Israel, and the recent history of this tribe has received almost no attention by researchers, every one who writes about the Jews of Ethiopia feels obliged to contribute his share to the ongoing debate about their origin. Politicians and journalists, Rabbis and political activists, not a single one of them withstood the temptation to play the role of the historian and invent a solution for this riddle.

Richard Pankhurst summarized the state of knowledge on the subject in 1992 as follows: "The early origins of the Falashas are shrouded in mystery, and, for lack of documentation, will probably remain so for ever."

==== Recent views ====
By 1994, modern scholars of Ethiopian history and Ethiopian Jews generally supported one of two conflicting hypotheses for the origin of the Beta Israel, as outlined by Steven Kaplan:

- An ancient Jewish origin, together with conservation of some ancient Jewish traditions by the Ethiopian Church. Kaplan identifies Simon D. Messing, David Shlush, Michael Corinaldi, Menachem Waldman, Menachem Elon and David Kessler as supporters of this hypothesis.
- A late ethnogenesis of the Beta Israel in the context of historical pressures between the 14th to 16th centuries, from a sect of Ethiopian Christians who took on Biblical Old Testament practices, and came to identify as Jews. Kaplan supports this hypothesis, and lists with him G. J. Abbink, Kay K. Shelemay, Taddesse Tamrat and James A. Quirin. Quirin differs from his fellow researchers in the weight that he assigns to an ancient Jewish element which the Beta Israel have conserved.

Some Ethiopian Jewish practices disagree with rabbinic practice but do match the practices of late Second Temple sects, suggesting that Ethiopian Jews may possess a tradition from ancient Jewish groups whose beliefs have become extinct elsewhere.

== History ==
=== Ancient history ===
The earliest archaeological evidence indicating the presence of Jews in the region comes from two incense burners discovered at Adi Qereh site near the ancient capital Yeha of Dʿmt, inscribed in Sabaic and dated to approximately 800 BCE, several centuries before the destruction of the First temple in Jerusalem. These inscriptions refer to "Hebrews" living among the local population. According to the researchers, these hereditary findings are consistent with archaeological findings on the penetration of crops domesticated in the Near East indicating that 2,500 years ago people from the Near East migrated to the Ethiopian Highlands bringing foreign crops such as wheats, barley and lentils.

In 325 CE, Ezana of Axum proclaimed Christianity as the state religion, leading to the construction of monasteries and churches throughout the empire. An inscription from this period references an insurrection led by a rebel named Pinchas, whose insurgents revolted and retreated to the Simien Mountains. It also details the surrender and the raising of taxes from Simien to Aksum.

The collapse of the Himyar Kingdom occurred following a pogrom led by Dhu Nuwas, which targeted the Aksumites and local Christian communities in Najran. In response, Kaleb of Axum launched a military campaign, with the support of the Byzantine Empire, Justinian the Great. This intervention led to the death of Dhu Nuwas and the subsequent Aksumite annexation of Himyar. According to the account of the Greek traveler Cosmas Indicopleustes from Alexandria, a significant portion of Jews were either forcibly converted to Christianity or exiled to the barren mountain known as Semiani, which refers to the Simien Mountains. Aksumite inscriptions from the 6th century also record another outbreak of tensions between Jewish and Christian communities in Aksum.

In the 9th century, a traveler known as Eldad ha-Dani, often referred to as "The Danite," arrived in the city of Kairouan, in modern-day Tunisia. Eldad claimed to come from an independent Jewish kingdom located in the mountains, south of Kush (modern-day Ethiopia). Eldad brought Halachic books with him, today scholars find it almost completely resembles the Halacha of the Beta Israel. Eldad asserted that his community did not adhere to the Talmud, but instead preserved a form of Judaism only adhering to the Written Torah. Upon his arrival, Eldad's claims were met with skepticism by the Kairouan Jewish community.

In response, the Jewish leaders sent a letter to Tzemach Gaon the Geon of Sura, a prominent halachic authority of the time, seeking clarification regarding Eldad's identity and religious practices. Tzemach Gaon affirmed that Eldad was indeed Jewish and said he belonged to the Tribe of Dan who settled in South of Cush, 135 years before the destruction of the First Temple. Eldad's works would be one of the first works bringing knowledge to the diaspora about the customs of the Beta Israel, his testimonies was also accepted and cited by the many prominent Geonim. His writings also gave to the rise of the legend Prester John.

In the mid 10th century, a revolt sparked, led by Gudit, who lead a revolt and sparked chaos across the Kingdom. She was a princess of Gideon IV, the King of the Simien. After her father was killed in battle with the Aksumite Empire, Gudit inherited his throne. Eventually, she defeated the Aksumite. Though her origins are murky, Ethiopian and Arab sources depict her as a Jewish zealot. She's credited for "laying waste" onto Aksum in addition the burning of Debre Damo monastery, in which after the sacking her name was changed from Esther to Gudit. For the burning and destruction of Axum, regarded as a holy city, the Kebra Nagast uses it a pretext as grounds to persecute the Beta Israel. She's also credited for her assassinations and the fall of the Aksumite dynasty.

During this time, Arab writer Ibn Hawqal writes:

The land of Habash has been ruled by a woman for many years, and she killed the king of Abyssinia, and ruled by a people called the al-Dani [Danites]. To this day, she rules an independent kingdom, and her kingdom borders Abyssinia to the south.

Additionally, Gudit established trade relations with the Arab caliphates, a departure from the policies of previous Aksumite rulers, who had refrained from doing so in the past. As part of these diplomatic efforts, she sent a zebra to the King of Yemen, who in turn, presented it as a gift to the Abbasid Caliph, Al-Qadir. who mentions he received the gift from a Jewish woman, who had overthrown the King of Abyssinia. Following her death, Gudit was eventually supplanted by the Zagwe dynasty.

=== Middle Ages ===
The Jewish presence in the region of Abyssinia is notably documented by the 12th-century traveller and historian Benjamin of Tudela writing circa 1150, observed the Jews in the area and makes a clear mention of the community:

“There are many Jews here. They are not subject to the Gentiles. They have cities and forts on the mountaintops, from where they raid the Christian Ethiopian Empire [...] they take spoils and make refuge in their mountains; no one prevails against them."

Additionally, the Venitian explorer Marco Polo also references the existence of a large Jewish community in the region of "Abash," which coincides with modern-day Abyssina [Habash].

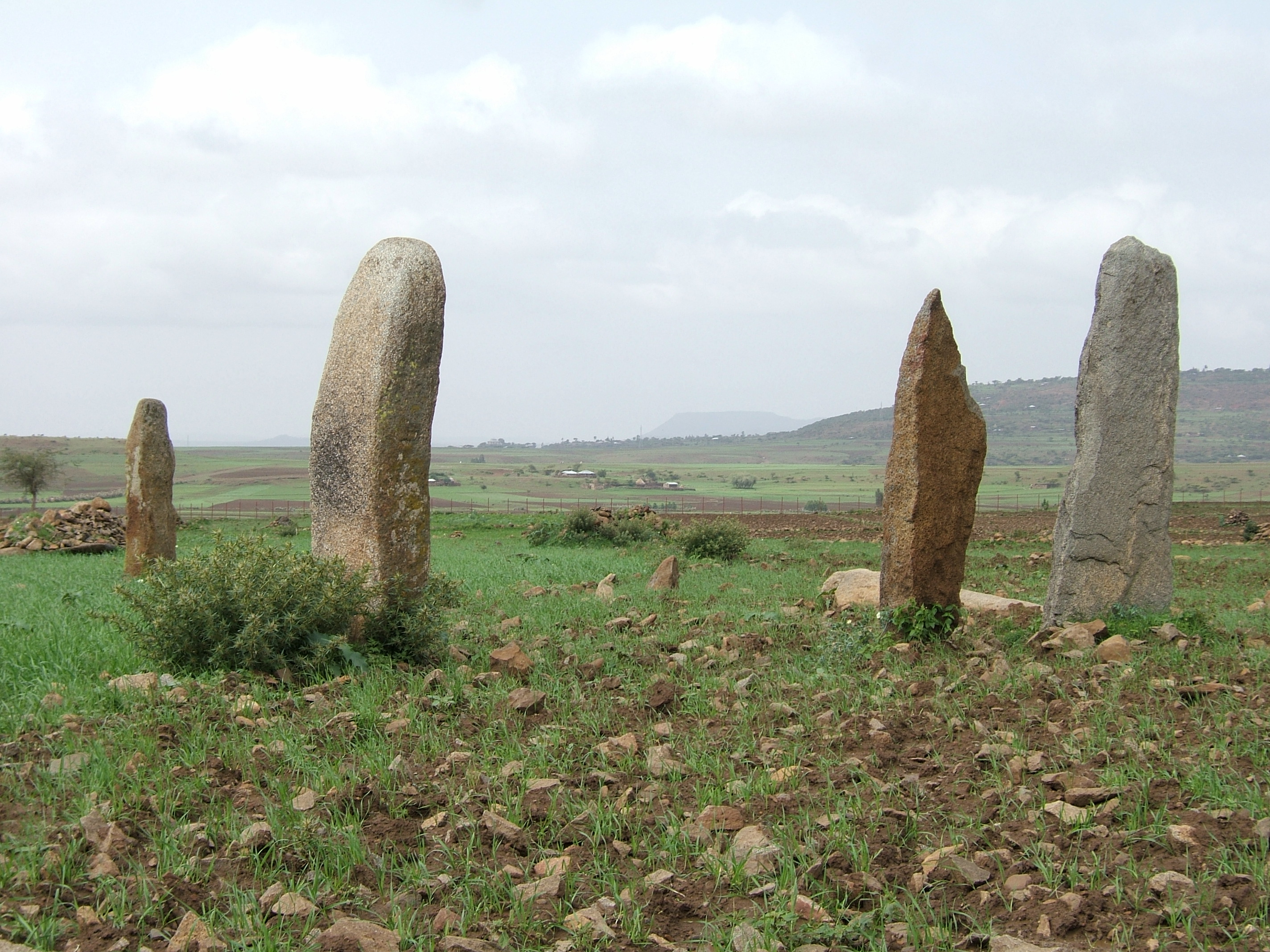
"Judith's Field": an area full of ruins of destroyed buildings which were ruined attributed by the forces of Queen Judith

In 1270, Yekuno Amlak overthrew the Zagwe dynasty and claimed descent from the Aksumite nobility that had survived the massacre orchestrated by the 10th-century ruler, Gudit. He established the Solomonic dynasty, which would govern Ethiopia for the next eight centuries. On August 10, 1270, The Emperor stated: "I will destroy the Jews," a pronouncement aimed at consolidating support from the Christian population who had been embroiled in constant warfare for decades. At the time, many viewed the Beta Israel community as "squatters" or "immigrants."

At the same time, an Ethiopian Christian monk, Zena Marqos, nephew of the King Yekuno Amlak (1270–1285), wrote an account of the religion and history of the Beta Israel. His informant, a converted Jew to Christianity, says that they arrived during the reign of King Solomon.

==== Medieval Period ====
In 1329, while Emperor Amda Seyon I was engaged in military campaigns against the Muslims of the Sultanate of Ifat, intelligence reports from his spies began to reach him. These reports indicated that the Jews had started to burn churches and conduct sneak attacks on imperial soldiers who were occupying their homeland and trying to convert the population, specifically in the regions of Semien, Wagara, Tselemti, and Szeged. In response to this growing threat, the Emperor called upon Tsaga Christos, the governor of Begemder, to quell the unrest. Tsaga Christos was tasked with leading his own forces, bolstered by reinforcements from neighboring provinces, to neutralize the Jewish insurgents.

The Emperor's primary objective was to prevent the Jewish factions from invading the Christian kingdom's territories and potentially overthrowing the Christian rule, as had occurred in earlier times. Simultaneously, the Emperor's forces continued their engagement with the Muslim forces in the Dera. The rebellion was ultimately subdued, and historical sources report that "The Jews hid, but when the Christian forces arrived, they leaped into the abyss."

The historical area of the Beta Israel

Following the successful suppression of the uprising, the commander of the imperial army sent an emissary to the Emperor to inform him that Tsaga Christos had triumphed over the Jewish fighters, defeated them, and seized considerable plunder. The remaining Jewish forces retreated into the Simien Mountains.

==== Persecution and Exile under Yeshaq I ====
Under Emperor Yeshaq I reign, tensions between the Jewish community and Ethiopia escalated. The emperor sought to extend his influence across the Empire and proposed that the leaders of Beta Israel become key members of the Ethiopian Empire. However, this offer, along with a subsequent tax increase, was met with resistance from the Jewish population, who rallied under their leader, Agor, to oppose the emperor's forces. The ensuing conflict took place in the Wagra region, where the emperor's superior military strength ultimately drove the Jewish army southward to the Simien Mountains. Following his conquest of a fertile area, the emperor proclaimed his victory. The Emperor later encouraged missionary activity in the area, establishing churches and baptizing many Jews who lived in the area under occupation into Christianity. The resistance of the local Jews led the Emperor to decree:

"If he is baptized into the Christian religion, he will inherit his ancestral land, and he will not be Falasha".

The term Falasha is derived from the root F-L-S/S in Geʽez, which translates to "invaders." In the context of the Beta Israel community, however, it encompasses additional meanings such as "foreigners," "squatters," and "immigrants." This broader interpretation reflects to the identity and historical experiences of the community as it is considered derogatory.

==== Persecution under Zara Yaqob ====
In 1445, Emperor Zara Yaqob married Seyon Moges daughter of Gideon V. The couple had three sons. In 1462, she was accused of espionage on behalf of the Jewish community during a rebellion launched while the Emperor was engaged in a campaign against the Adal Sultanate. The revolt was quickly suppressed, his wife was executed, and many Jewish leaders were imprisoned. Following the victory, Zara Yaqob adopted the title “Exterminator of the Jews.”

Toward the end of Zara Yaqob's reign, the legitimacy of his new heir, Baeda Maryam I, was questioned due to his mother's Jewish background and rumors of her continued adherence to Judaism. After her death, Baeda Maryam secretly arranged her burial at Makdas Maryam Church in Debre Birhan, allegedly bribing clergy to conceal the act. Upon discovering this, the Emperor ordered his son beaten, but later reconciled with him following pressure from the Ethiopian Orthodox Church.

Baeda Maryam was crowned emperor eight years after his mother's death and Zaga Amlak's escape. Accusations regarding his possible Jewish sympathies may have contributed to his decision to wage a prolonged military campaign, lasting seven years, against the Jewish population of Begemder province, led by General Markos.

==== Markos riots ====
General Markos, was a General under Emperor Baeda Maryam I. He was sent to quell the Jews, during his time, each Jewish settlement was responsible for a local governor who reported directly to him. Markos's actions included the demolition of synagogues and the establishment of churches in their place, the baptism of local Jews under threat, and the murder of people who refused to convert to Christianity. The fighting against the Jews continued uninterrupted because the emperor signed a peace treaty in 1465 with Sultan Badlay ibn Sa'ad ad-Din, which gave Markos extensive freedom of action, as well as soldiers who were transferred from the borders to fight the Jews. Markos carried out a brutal inquisition, and when the leaders of the Jewish communities arrived he gave the order to behead them in revenge for the crucifixion of Jesus. The emperor's records state:

And Markos fought against them and encamped for seven years at the foot of their hill, and then he defeated them with great effort and cunning, and delivered them into his hand, and conquered all their cities. And after that a counsel came to his heart, saying: How shall I forgive these accursed ones... It is better to destroy them than to let them live... He ordered the herald to proclaim: Every Falasha shall come to whom I have commanded, and whoever does not come, his house shall be destroyed and his property shall be forfeited. And after that all the Falashas gathered around Judge Marcus... Then he ordered his men to cut off their necks with the sword, and they consumed them, until their blood was shed, and their corpses filled the field. And the word of mockery which their fathers spoke on the day of the crucifixion of our Lord was fulfilled upon them, saying: Their blood be on us, and on our children.

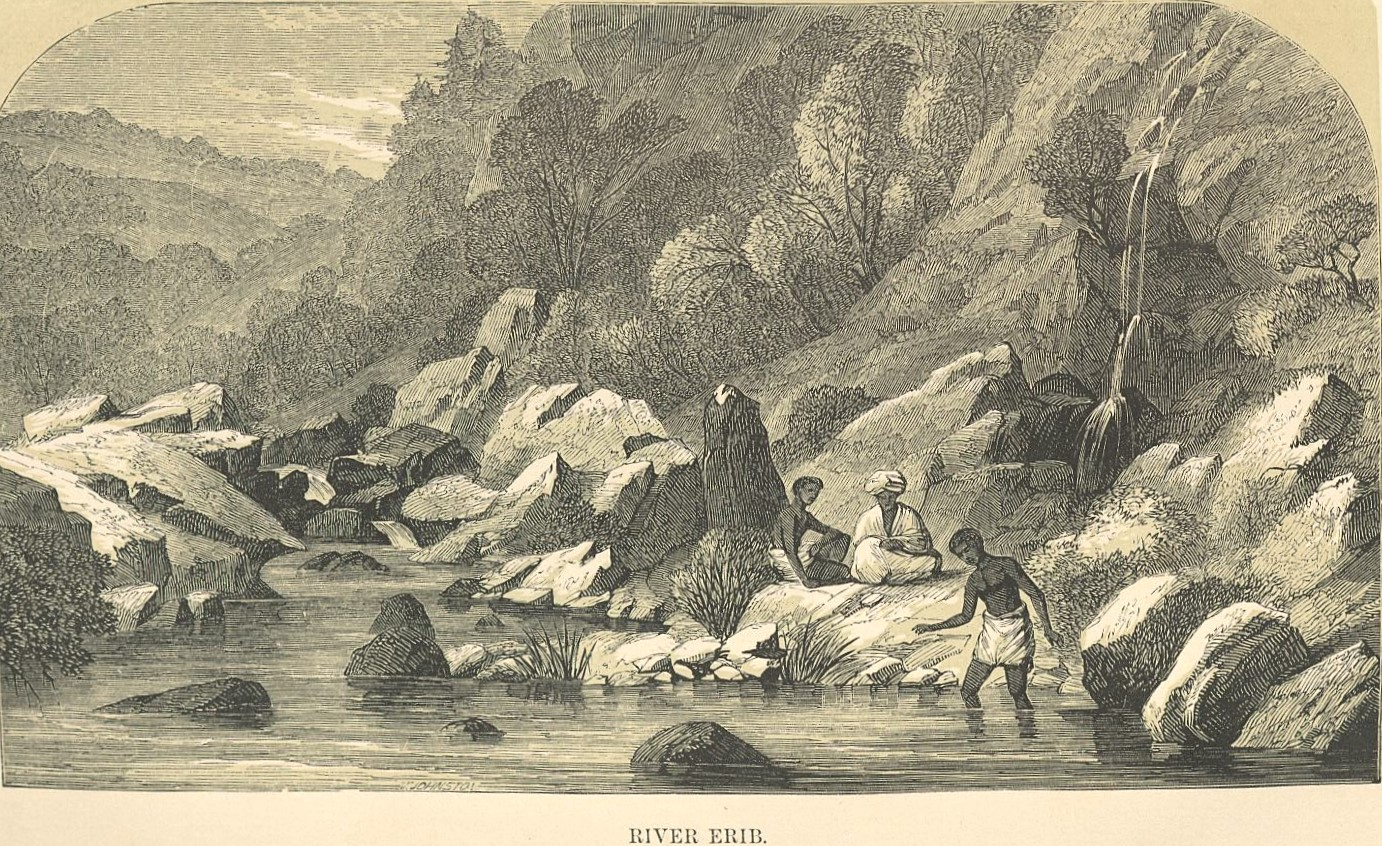
Falashas immersing in a river

In this period, most of the religious relics were either burnt or looted, included numerous sacred book. In addition, the Jews were unable to practice their religious traditions for 80 years and were exiled into foreign lands, and their land was transferred to the church and nobility. Any form of practicing Judaism was illegal at this time and punishable by death. The Jews were made to live as tenants under Governors who kept them under their supervision, due to this time of much persecution some of their religious laws and customs were lost forever which included the incorporation of some Christian elements. In order to avoid assimilation they made a religious law "Atancon" which made them avoid contact with non-Jews, and those who made contact with non-Jews had to immerse themselves before re-entering the community.

During this time, Rabbi Eliyahu of Ferrara, a highly respected Torah scholar from Italy, made Aliyah to the Land of Israel, passing through Egypt along the way. After a tortuous journey, he reached Jerusalem, on May 1, 1437. He makes pilgrimage and verifies the rumours that had reached Italy about the Tribe of Dan overcoming their enemies. In his letter he describes the Jews in Abyssinia:

I think I have already told you what a young Jewish man told me about the residents of his area, who are their own masters and not subservient to others. They are surrounded by a great nation called Hubash... They have the Torah and an oral commentary, but they do not have the Talmud or our poskim. I studied several of their mitzvot, and found that some follow our opinion while others follow the opinion of the Karaites. They have the Book of Esther but not Hanukkah. They are a distance of three months away from us, and the River Gozen runs through their land."

During this time many Ethiopian Jews appeared in Egypt and the Mediterranean, and was cashed in by the local Jewish communities and integrated, joined synagogues and communities. Between 1485 and 1488, Rabbi Obadiah ben Abraham of Bertinoro, meets two Jewish prisoners from Ethiopia who were sold into slavery and cashed by the Jews of Egypt, and integrated into their synagogues. The Rabbi, describes in a letter the Beta Israel were "mighty children of Israel" he writes in his letter that the Jewish kingdom lies within the borders of the Ethiopian Empire and the Christians managed to subdue the Jews after centuries of bloody battles:

Indeed, what I have learned and know without a doubt is that on one of the borders of the kingdom of the Prester John (Abyssinia)... there the Israelites are certainly encamped, and they have five presidents or kings, and it is said that for hundreds of years they fought with the Prester John, great and mighty wars, and finally, in the summer, the hand of the Prester John prevailed over them and struck them with a great and mighty blow, and entered their lands and destroyed and exiled them, and almost all memory of Israel was lost from those places. And those who remained in them he decreed strange decrees to violate their religion, similar to the decrees that the Greek kingdom decreed in the days of the Hasmoneans... and their enemies returned to them a few souls of men and women and a great number of people from distant nations and brought some of them to Egypt and the Jews redeemed them in Egypt. And I saw two of them in Egypt and they were dark, but not black like the Kushites, and I could not distinguish between them whether they kept the law of the Karaites or the law of the rabbis, because in some things they seemed to keep the law of the Karaites, in what "They said that there would be no fire in their houses on the Sabbath, and in other things they appear to be observing the teachings of the rabbis, and they say that they are referring to the Tribe of Dan... This is what I saw with my own eyes and heard with my own ears, even though the two men did not know the Holy language except a tiny bit, and their Arabic language is barely understood by the people of the land."

Another letter from the rabbi after receiving letters from the Jews of Yemen about the difficult situation of Ethiopian Jews after the Markos riots that took place between 1465 and 1472:

"... And we fear lest, God forbid, the rumor be true, for the voice is growing very strong. May God protect His children and His servants, Amen."

==== Early Rabbinic views ====
Rabbi David ben Solomon ibn Abi Zimra (RaDBaZ), a prominent 16th-century a Sephardic rabbinic authority and the Chief Rabbi of Egyptian Jewry, addressed the status of the Ethiopian Jews due to doubts whether they were Karaites or Rabbinites in his responsa. He ruled that the Jews of Ethiopia are not Karaites and empathetically ruled they're un-doubtfully Jewish and are descendants of the Tribe of Dan, who had settled in Abyssinia. This position arises within the context of Halachic discussions, leading to the call of Redemption of captives. Retrospectively Rabbi Yaakov de Castro, also known as the Morikash for his commentary on the Shulchan Aruch, followed his teachers ruling.

The issuing of this halakhic ruling by the Radbaz was later used for the advent of Operation Moses in which Rabbi Ovadia Yosef brought to Israeli government requesting to hasten action to bring the community to Israel.

==== Early Modern period ====
All lands governed by the Beta Israel

The Kabbalist Rabbi Abraham ben Eliezer Halevi the Elder, one of the exiles from Spain, emigrated to the Land of Israel and lived in Jerusalem, and wrote about the Jewish kingdom in Ethiopia. Halevi, who often dealt with calculations of redemption and the coming of the Messiah, thought that redemption was near and that the war of Ethiopian Jews against the Christian empire was the precursor of its arrival. in his epistle he refers to the Kingdom of Simien with their locality "Gideons" and writes that in the land of Habash there was "The harsh Kingdom of the mighty Jews". During this time, a Portuguese Kabbalist Solomon Molcho wrote an epistle regarding the Ethiopian community and believed they will be the ones who realise the coming of the Messiah.

During this period, numerous epistles were composed by renowned authors of the time, such as Moses ben Mordecai Bassola, Isaac Akrish, and Abraham Farissol, among others. Additionally, various writings emerged concerning the Beta Israel and their interactions with the Jewish communities in the Mediterranean. Many Ethiopian Jews at this time would be cashed in by the local communities, joined synagogues, intermarried, etc. The legends of the conflicts involving the Beta Israel and the Ethiopian Empire gained fame and spread across the world.

During the mid-16th century, the Beta Israel was heavily persecuted, by the ruling elites in which the Emperor confined himself on the agriculturally richer part of their territory, as leading as well leading small scale raids) into their villages and forts, which devastated the community, with a gradual increase of forced conversions and burning of manuscripts and scrolls occurred during this time. The Emperor also looted and burnt all the possessions, in which we can see an increase of Christian influence in this time.

During this time the Adal Sultanate, launched a holy war against the Ethiopian Empire, in which this major conflict caused the decline of the Ethiopian Empire, which the Beta Israel saw as divine intervention as retribution for the persecution their suffered under the yoke of the Ethiopian Empire for centuries. During this time they were also drawn into the conflict. During this time the Adal Sultanate concilidated themselves across the Ethiopian Empire, in which they reach the Beta Israel heartland, the leaders of the community offer their loyalty to the Sultan, an account of the conversation is recorded during this time by an eyewitness, Shihab al-Dīn Aḥmad ibn ʿAbd al-Qādir ibn Sālim ibn ʿUthmān, in which he writes:

Those Jews that dwelled in the land of Habash (once) controlled the district of Semien. They are called, Falasa, because they chant the praise of the One God and have faith in none other. They have no prophet and no saint. The people of Bahr Amba have subjugated them for the past forty years and employed them to work the land for them. They tilled the fields for them. After the Ahmad ibn Ibrahim al-Ghazi had won the victory over the patrician Sa'ul, all the Falasa came from deep valleys and even from mountain caves – because they did not dwell in the lowlands, but in the mountains and in caves. They said to the imam "For forty years there has been hatred between us and the people of Bahr Amba. Let us kill them now, those who are left. And let us occupy their strongholds now that you have conquered them. We will be sufficient to do this to them. So, remain in your camp, and what we will do to them will astonish you."

According to the writer, the Jews were successful in their campaign and in return the Sultan granted them exemption from the Jizya tax and allowed them to retake their former lands and worship freely. After the death of Dawit II, the Beta Israel then switched their alliance and began supporting Emperor Gelawdewos against the Muslim invaders.

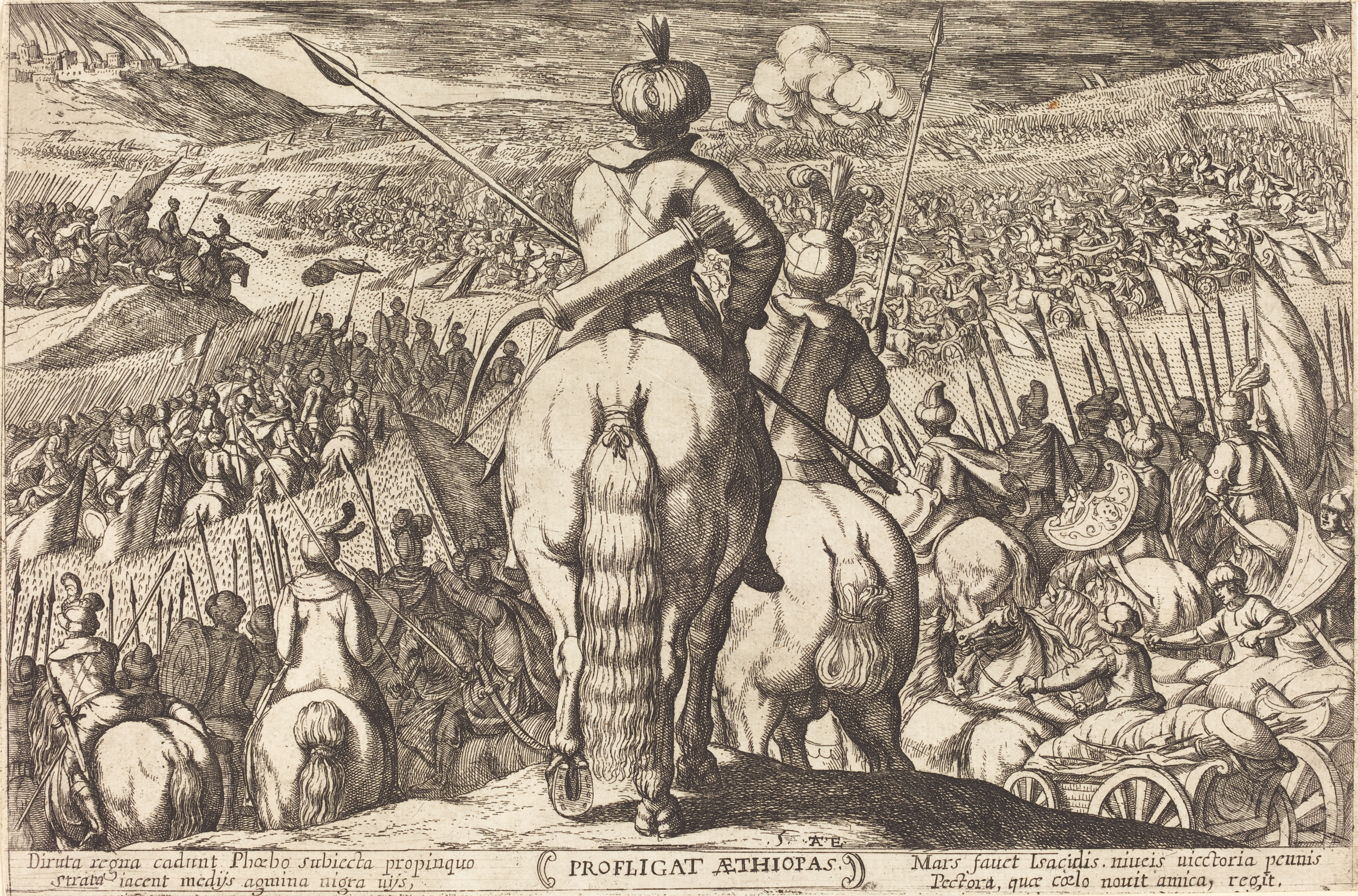
Defeat of the Ethiopians by the Israelites, Antonio Tempesta

The Christian Ethiopians did succeed eventually in defeating the Muslims and preventing Ahmad ibn Ibrahim from conquering Ethiopia. However, after the war ended, the Ottoman Empire invaded, in a last minute ditch the Beta Israel switched their alliance with the Emperor and started supporting the Ottomans. The geographer, Abraham Farissol details the help of the Beta Israel to the Ottomans during the war.

During the Ottoman offensive, the Mamluk-Ottoman General, Özdemir Pasha corresponded with the Ottoman sultan on the war, in the letter Ozdemir states that the Ottoman force survived due to a Jewish prince sending 12,000 horsemen to their aid in the letter he wrote to Sultan Suleiman II:

If it wasn't for the Jewish prince who sent those 12,000 Jewish horsemen, I would have risked losing all my men.

After the death of Gelawdeos, Emperor Sarsa Dengel, succeeded him and proved to be more oppressive to the Jews than his predecessors. The Emperor launched a devastating campaign against the Beta Israel with the use of cannons that he recently captured from the Ottomans. While on this campaign, Sarsa Dengel learned that the Borana Oromo's had invaded the provinces of Shewa, Wej, and Damot. Despite this, Sarsa Dengel refused to defend these territories against the Oromos and instead continued to focus his attention on the Beta Israel. This decision generated considerable frustration among his officials and also had devastating affects for the future, but the Emperor justified his action by stating:

It is better for me that I fight with the enemies of the blood of Jesus Christ [i.e. Jews] than go to fight against the Galla.

The Ethiopian forces continued to pacify the Jews, culminating in the capture and execution of the Jewish leader, Gershom. Following his death, many of the Beta Israel committed mass suicide to avoid forced conversions.

===== Gondar period =====
In 1614, the Jews of Seimen rebelled against the Emperor Susenyos I. By 1624, the revolt had been quelled, and the conclusive defeat of a subsequent uprising the following year marked the end of the political and military autonomy of the Beta Israel. Afterwards, the emperor confiscated their lands and forcibly baptized them. He forbade the practice of Judaism, ordering his men to "erase the memory of the Jews", which included mass killing, looting and burning of their belongings and holy books. As a result, much traditional Jewish culture and practice was lost or changed, including the Hebrew language.

The Portuguese Jesuit order succeeded in converting Emperor Susenyos to Christianity and brought the Portuguese Inquisition to Ethiopia. Thousands of Jews perished. A Portuguese diplomat and traveller, Manuel de Almeida, talks about them extensively in his History of Upper Abassia.

The destruction of the institutional foundations of the Jews in the north of Ethiopia had without doubt resulted in the destruction of their books and archives, thus erasing the memory of their history and their origins.

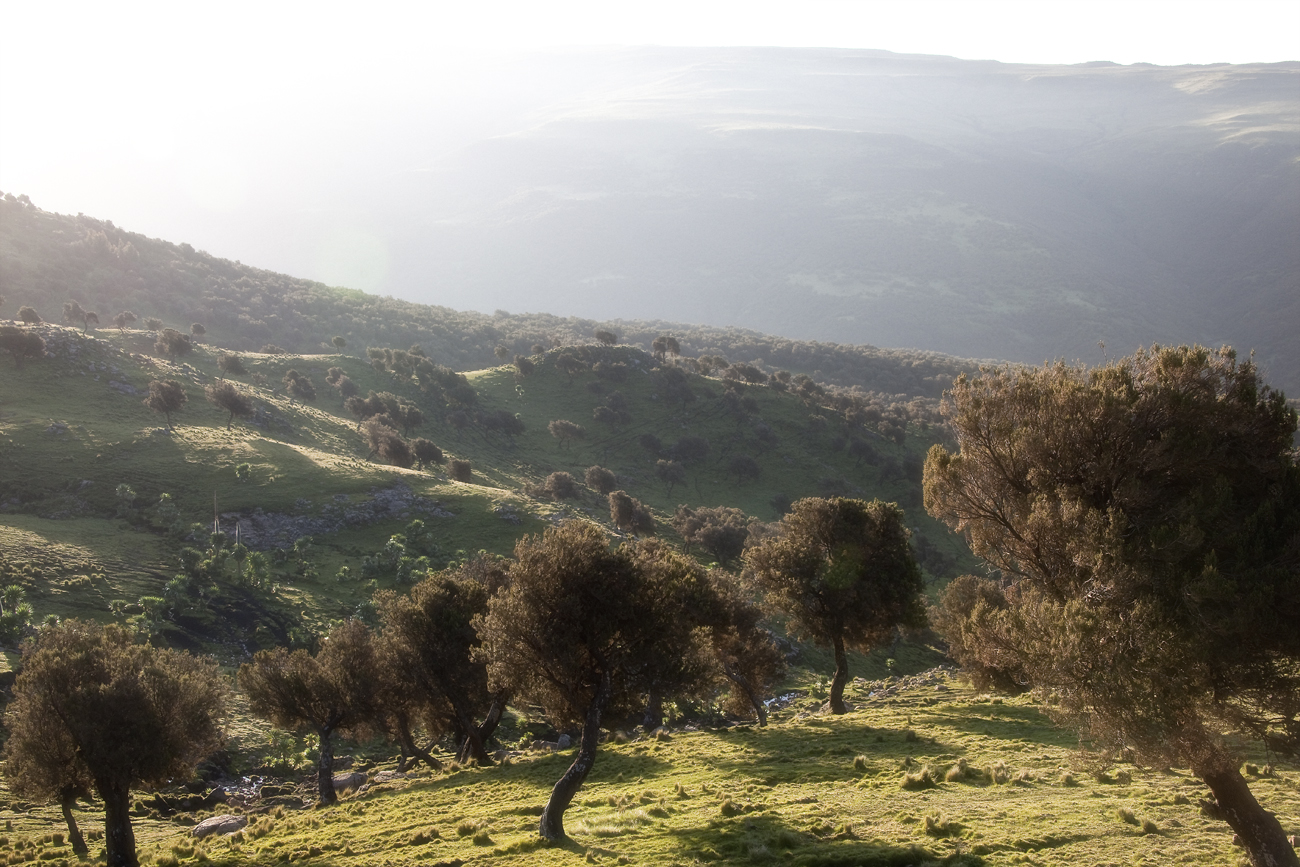
Semien Mountains

During this time a Rabbi named Shlomo from Vienna appeared in Ethiopia, bringing with him many books, aiming to help the community with religious issues. The Jesuits caused a religious debate in front of the Emperor over the Bible's interpretation of the prophecies allegedly telling of the birth of Jesus. One of the debates was held in the village of Dankaz, where the emperor lived. The rabbi won the argument in front of a large crowd; many were drawn to his words and his influence in the community was great. Due to this influence the Jesuits ordered his books to be burnt and urged Susenyos to execute him. His fate, however, is unknown. After almost 30 years of the Emperor's reign, a Jew named Abraham (who is identified as Shlomo by Wolf Leslau) headed over the Beta Israel for Susenyos, pleaded with the Emperor for his people to worship freely. Abraham's request appears in an anonymous chronicle:

An Israelite named Abraham appeared at the Emperor's court and the Emperor liked him. He said to him: "What do you want me to get you? "He replied," If I like my lord, I beg you to let my people return to their faith." The emperor accepted his request and replied, "Everything will be as you have requested," and the emperor declared, "I give into your hand all the Israelites in my land. All those who survived assimilation shall be at peace, and the remains of the exiles returned to their seats and worshiped the religion of their ancestors".

Although his request was heeded, and many returned to their ancestral lands, the Portuguese still insisted on forced conversions, not only for the Beta Israel but for the whole country. For example, Manuel de Almeida describes the situation of the Beta Israel at the time:

There were Jews in Ethiopia from the first. Some of them were converted to the law of Christ Our Lord; others persisted in their blindness and formerly possessed many wide territories, almost the whole Kingdom of Dambea and the provinces of Ogara and Semien. This was when the [Christian] empire was much larger, but since the [pagan and Muslim] Gallas have been pressing in upon them [from the east and south], the Emperors have pressed in upon them [i.e., the Jews to the west?] much more and took Dembea and Ogara from them by force of arms many years ago. In Semien, however, they defended themselves with great determination, helped by the position and the ruggedness of their mountains. Many rebels ran away and joined them till the present Emperor Setan Sequed [throne name of Susneyos], who in his 9th year fought and conquered the King Gideon and in his 19th year attacked Semien and killed Gideon. ... The majority and the flower of them were killed in various attacks and the remainder surrendered or dispersed in different directions. Many of them received holy baptism, but nearly all were still as much Jews as they had been before. There are many of the latter in Dambea and in various regions; they live by weaving cloth and by making zargunchos (spears), ploughs and other iron articles, for they are great smiths. Between the Emperor's kingdoms and the Cafres [Negroes] who live next to the Nile outside imperial territory, mingled together with each other are many more of these Jews who are called Falashas here. The Falashas or Jews are ... of [Arabic] race [and speak] Hebrew, though it is very corrupt. They have their Hebrew Bibles and sing the psalms in their synagogues.

The situation of the Beta Israel improved after the ascension of Emperor Fasilides in 1632, who expelled the Jesuits. However, the Emperor confined numerous Jews near his palace to serve as craftsmen, silversmiths, artisans and other roles. The situation was mostly peaceful for the community until, in the mid-18th century, the Ethiopian emperor lost effective central power. This period, known as the Zemene Mesafint, lasted for a century and increased the isolation of the community.

According to the early-19th century missionary Samuel Gobat, the Christians considered the Jews "Bouda" (a term used in Ethiopia to denote Ethiopian Jews as beasts), or sorcerers. The Jews often fell victim to marauding warlords, as Gobat reported: "Their cattle are often taken from them. They carry no arms, either for attack or defense." During this period, many members of the community were killed recklessly by the warlords, and the Jewish religion was effectively lost for some years.

Scottish traveller James Bruce noted during this time that almost all their scribes had been killed, and said that many bought Christian bibles and reconstructed it. During this time Hebrew was almost completely gone and was replaced with Ge'ez. In the 1840s by the preeminent Kahen of Qwara Abba Widdayeh restored the religion.

=== Early modern Period ===
During the mid 19th century, the Zemene Mesafint ended, in which peace and stability was brought back to the region. By the end of the Zemene Mesafint, a Monk named Abba Mahri (Mahri ben Suthal), interpreted the dream of a poor Christian woman who had turned to him for help, predicting that she would give birth to a strong son who would bear the name "Kassa". He also predicted that he would grow up to become Emperor Tewodros II, and to restore the Ethiopian Empire. During this time, many of the Emperor's advisers tried to convince the Emperor to exterminate the Beta Israel, once and for all, but the Emperor, due to his great affection for the community, denied them repeatedly. Abba Mahri proclaimed that the Gathering of Israel was approaching, and that it was time for the community to stop only yearning to return, and to emigrate to the holy land on foot, for which he was given special permission by the Emperor. (60 years before Herzl's Zionist plan), he was joined by many who considered him a Tzadik. Several Christian missionaries including Johann Martin Flood who wrote about him:

Once, I was introduced to a monk, Father Mahri, who was completely convinced that the time was near when God would gather the Jews of all nations into the land of their fathers. He believed that they would then build their temple in Jerusalem, as described in Ezekiel's prophecy, and worship God according to the Law of Moses.

The historians see Abba Mahri as the sole or main initiator of the aliyah attempt in 1862, and took practical steps to organize it; he sent emissaries to all the communities of Beta Israel, gathered the names of the ones to make the journey and led their departure. And intended to lead those who left for the journey to the Red Sea, to cross it and from there to make the rest of the road leading to Jerusalem. At some point, Abba Mahri recognized the failure of the attempt, realized that the prophecy was for the future, and returned to Dembiya. Many of the survivors made their way back with Aba Mahri; a few, with Aba Mhri's permission, tried to continue their journey to Jerusalem. Some traditions hold that some of the immigrants came together with Mahri from the mountains to the Red Sea, and that when they reached the river Abba Mahri raised his staff, as Moses did in the Exodus from Egypt, in the hope that the stormy waters would open up to the crossing, and only when the sea did not open many jumped in the water, which claimed many lives after this they recognized the failure of the journey and make their way back to Ethiopia and settling in newly formed communities in Tigray and Eritrea. The realising of the failure of the catastrophic event led to increase pressure from the new founded missionaries who tried to convert them.

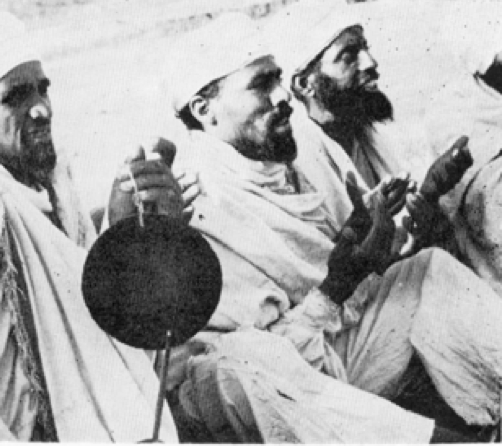
Picture showing Kessim praying on the ground in a Mesgid

After the death of Tekle Giyorgis II, another prince Yohannes IV took the throne, and proved to be more zealous and harsher to the Beta Israel than his predecessors, in which he lifted the ban of foreign missionaries in Ethiopia, unless they direct their mission towards the Beta Israel, this is because he believed that Beta Israel were foreigners (like most of his predecessors) therefore did not mind if they were targeted by missionaries. this is proved as he only preferred the local priests to convert the Muslims of Wollo instead of Missionaries. During this time, the Emperor placed the Jews under Tekle Haymanot of Gojjam in which they had to either pay tax in Maria Theresa thaler or Salt for their protection.

During this time, Missionaries have a strong presence in community, especially via Messianic Jews, in which many tell fallacies and offer commodities to pressure members of the community into converting, taking advantage of the poor situation of the community, in addition to new threats made by Yohannes IV if they did not convert, many of whom that converted are known today as the Falash Mura. News of this reaches many Rabbis and Jewish leaders in Europe, whom many sympathized for the community send aid and relief. Following a call by Rabbi Azriel Hildesheimer regarding Ethiopian Jews, the Hakham Bashi of the Ottoman Empire, Rabbi Yakir Gueron issued a letter in 1866 entitled "Call to Help the Israelites in the Land of Kush" in which he stressed that there is "no difference between Ethiopian Jews and the rest of the Jews" in the postcards, warning of the danger of missionaries who threatened the witness and called for action to save her. Leading rabbis in Europe make a public call to use all possible ways to save the Ethiopian Jews. Also the Karaites of Saint Petersburg hears about this appeal, and sends an interesting letter to community, titled "Letter to the Falashas" in support and asks questions to the community, following the lack of effort by the Alliance to help many rabbis take action.

Rabbi Azriel Hildesheimer was one of the first to take practical action, during his tenure as rabbi of the Austro-Hungarian community of Eisenstadt. In his letter to Rabbi Solomon Judah Loeb Rapoport of Prague, dated Sheshvan Purim 5624/1864, he states that “the desire to do good for my people burns within me. My heart says that I must take this holy burden upon my shoulders, formulate my intentions, implement this plan, reflect, and make a beginning, and that I must lead this great event.” in which he replies that he supports this plan and calls it a mitzvah mission: "Whoever saves one Jewish soul, it is as if he saved an entire world.”

Six months later, on 11 Tishrei 5625/1865, Hildesheimer makes a “public appeal to all our fellow Jews,” which is published in the major Jewish publications. Rabbi Yaakov Dovid Wilovsky of Safed, ruled the Beta Istael are "Jews in the full sense of the word" and supported the mission made an appeal in Constantinople, and gathered funds and donations to help aid the situation of the Ethiopian Jews, to help protect them from the pressures of its perescutors and missionaries. During this time many Rabbis write in support of the mission including Zvi Hirsch Kalischer writes in support of this; "As often as I speak of him, I do earnestly remember” (Jeremiah 31:19) that he has done very well on the issue of the Falashas, to arouse the spirit of our fellow Jews, to teach the wayward knowledge of how they should worship the Lord, our God, according to the holy Written Torah and the Oral Torah, and to preserve them from straying into the ways of the inciters, the missionaries, God forbid. This is certainly a great mitzvah. We must act on behalf of these souls, to grant knowledge to the ignorant among the people in distant lands, to bring them under the shadow of the Divine, and to prevent the hunters from snaring their human prey."

Further in his letter, Rabbi Kalischer makes practical proposals for action. In Germany in 1864, Rabbi Marcus (Meyer) Lehmann's Yiddish publication Der Israelit writes prominent rabbis had nominated themselves as candidates for the central committee for rescue operations – the nominees include Rabbi Nathan Marcus Adler, Chief Rabbi of the British Empire; Rabbi Salomon Ulmann, chief rabbi of France; Rabbi Jacob Ettlinger; Rabbi Seligman Baer Bamberger and Rabbi Samson Raphael Hirsch of Frankfurt.

The Malbim, while in Paris, writes a letter to the heads of the Alliance Israélite Universelle, recommending that Professor Yosef Halevi, lead a rescue mission, calling it “a mitzvah mission.” In his words to one of the organization's directors, he says that in his opinion, the Falashas are undoubtedly Jews and that the Diaspora Jews should work to rescue them.

In the mid 19th century, The Lithuanian Jewish traveller Jacob Saphir travels to Jerusalem, where he meets 2 Ethiopian Jews. Later in his travels to Yemen, he hears numerous stories about the Beta Israel from the Jews there and returns with many stories which brings attention to Europeans Jews of the situation of the community and many scholars and travellers go to visit the community. Among these travellers is Joseph Halévy, a French orientalist who met with the Beta Israel in which he presents himself as a "white Falasha" but the community at first refuses to believe him due to the Missionary activity at the time, he also writes that they believed they were the last Jews left at the time, indicating that they had been in exile and isolated from world Jewry for a very long time. In his writings, he describes his interacting with the community:

You should know, dear brothers, that I am also a Falashi, I am one of you! I believe in no other God but the one God Himself, and my religion is none other but the heritage of the Jewish people from Mount Sinai. . . . Finally the masses called out together, “You are a Falashi! A Falashi with white skin! You are mocking us! Who has ever heard or seen such a thing? Are there white Falashas under the sun?” I tried to tell them and to pledge on my faith that all the Falashas in Jerusalem and in the other countries of the world were white, and that their skin was no different from that of the other peoples among whom they lived. My mention of the word “Jerusalem,” which I uttered coincidentally, immediately annulled any doubt the Falashas may have had regarding my words. Like lightning in the dark of night, the word “Jerusalem” lit up the eyes and hearts of my lost brothers. With eyes full of tears, they cried, “Ah, have you also visited Jerusalem the holy, blessed city? Have you seen the beautiful Mount Zion with your own eyes, and our magnificently built Temple, the admired and exalted palace in which the God of Israel loves to dwell in honor within? Ah, have you perhaps seen with your own eyes the grave of our foremother Rachel? Have you been in Bethlehem and in the city of Hebron, where our holy patriachs are buried?

After returning to Paris, Halevy writes a positive report and requests that the Alliance Israélite Universelle immediately transfer 8,000 Jews to Ottoman Syria. however the organization refuse to comply with the recommendations of Halévy. After these contacts, the Beta Israel to fall more or less into oblivion.

==== Kefu-qän, the "Bad Days" ====
Between 1888 and 1892, North Ethiopia experienced a series of disasters: devastating famines, invasion of the Sudanese Dervishes of the Mahdi, and the African rinderpest epizootic epidemic. The death toll was very high. "Mothers cooked and ate their own children. Horrible things are done, which are unspeakable". The Beta Israel, during this time were a very poor, marginalized minority group, and were particularly affected, as well as their monasteries. It is estimated that between half and two-thirds of the community disappear during this period when world Judaism forgets them, which the Beta Israel remember's as Kefu-qän, the "Bad Days".

At the end of the 19th century the Ansar movement, a Sudanese Dervish movement, attacked British occupied Egypt, culminating in the Mahdist War. During this time, the Mahdists demanded the conversion of the Emperor Yohannes IV, and the governor of Begemder, Tekle Haymanot of Gojjam, and of their subjects to Islam. In early 1888, the military commander Osman Digna and Abdallah ibn Muhammad, launched a jihad into Begemder, and conducted a violent rampage, burning monasteries, villages, and holy scriptures. During this time, it is reported that 2/3 of the Beta Israel were killed, including priests, monks, and Hachems; almost 200 of their synagogues were also destroyed. The High Priest's letter in 1905 recorded:

Before there were many; before there were 200 synagogues, now there are only 30. During the Dervishes, a frightening number of people died. We are in great suffering. Our books were destroyed; the Dervishes set them on fire. We no longer have schools; they have been destroyed.”

A the community was hugely hit during the 1890s when a famine occurred which killed 90% of all cattle from missionaries;

"Before they were fighting over ritual purity of the cattle, and now they fought over the skin".

In 1893, the recovery began and food prices began to fall. Some refugees began to return to their homes, and others fled for fear of poverty. Many areas did not thrive as before. Various testimonies from 1894 indicate that some areas of Begemder had not recovered from the blow, even after a decade:

When I visited the place many years ago, many Falashas lived there, but now all of them have disappeared and we are told they died during the famine.”

During this time significant portions of the communities of Dembiya, Semien, Tselemti, declined in numbers, from a few thousand to only a few hundred. A missionary of the Church's ministry among Jewish People, Michael Erguei who toured the community in 1899 wrote:

”Sakalat is a very fertile land. Before the Dervish invasion, it was extremely rich, like Demba, but now it is poor and overpopulated. Thousands of Jews once lived in Sakalat, but today their numbers do not exceed a few hundred.”

The impact of the Dembiya disasters was among the worst:

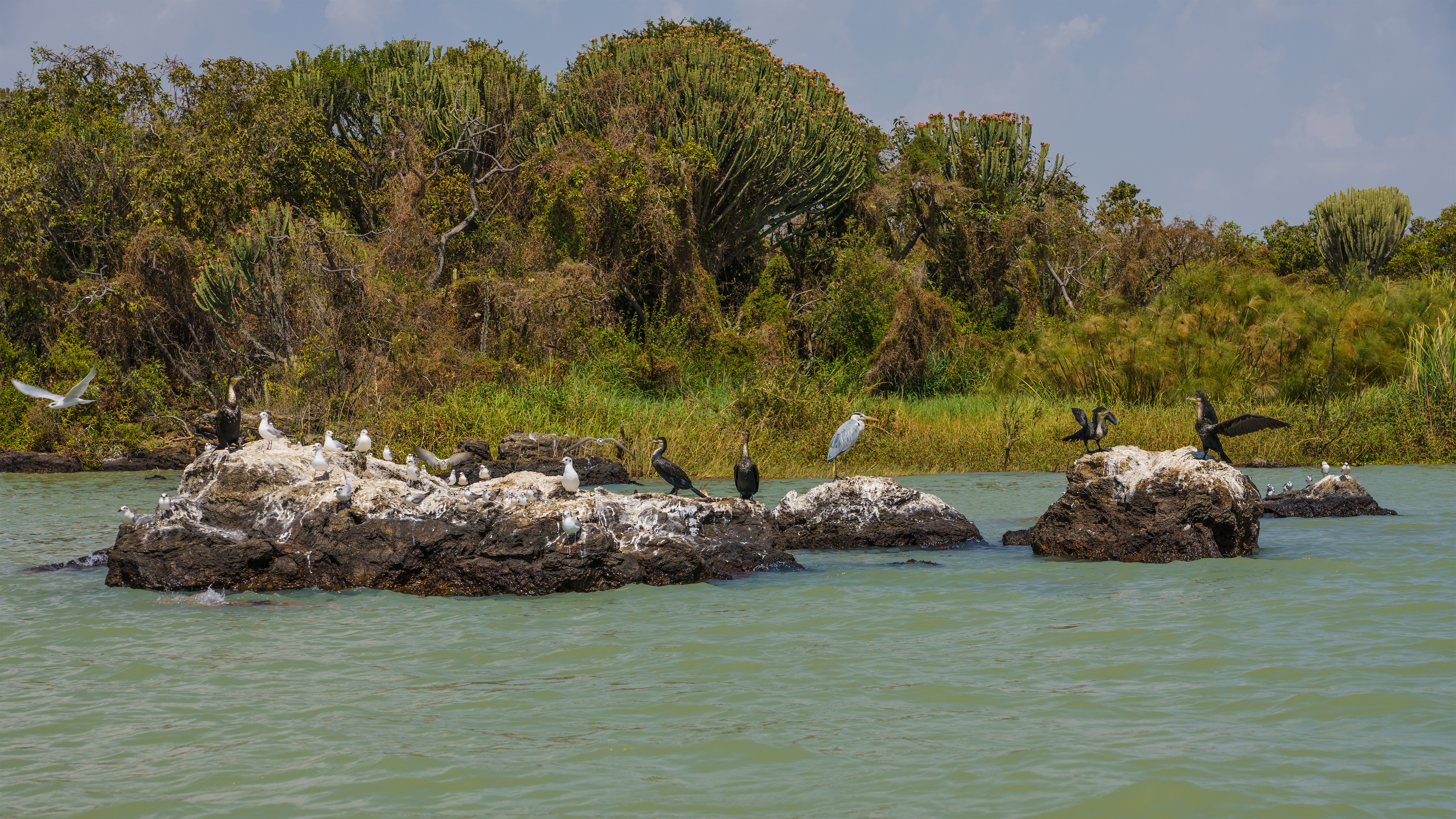
Dembiya

"Alas! Over the past three years, the beautiful country of Dembiya has become a complete wasteland where only a few inhabitants can be found here and there. Crops and cattle crops, which once flourished across the country, can no longer be found here; hyenas, leopards and lions are in fact the only inhabitants of the land that stretches between Parka and Dingle.”

==== Aftermath ====
During this period, the congregation could not maintain all religious practices, such as Kosher food and drink or Shabbat observance, much less sacrifice and survival dictated their path. Also, the number of missionaries from Europe increased; they offered services, such as hospitals, education, food. Many people resisted, but those who joined were regarded as the "Falash Mura". This led to some members of the congregation becoming Christians. However, Mikael Aragawi points out that these converts were not true Christians and did not know Christianity at all. Some members of the community returned to their communities after the famine, and after a brief period of isolation and purification became part of it again. However, those who left and did not revert, were excommunicated, and often were confined closely outside of the communities. Intermarriage between their future descendants and non-Jews was low, at 0.3%.

==== Renewal of the community ====
In 1904, Jacques Faitlovitch, a Jewish scholar and former student of Joseph Halévy at the École des Hautes Études in Paris, embarked on a mission to northern Ethiopia to engage with the Beta Israel community firmly believing their connection to the Jewish people, and worked to bring them closer to world Jewry. His expedition was funded by the Jewish philanthropist Edmond James de Rothschild and given the blessing by Chief Rabbi Zadoc Kahn. When he arrives in Ethiopia and first presents himself to the community, due to the Messianic Jewish activity of the time he notes, they refuse to accept he's Jewish and it took some months of convincing until he could enter their synagogues.

When he meets them, the Falashas are marginalized and poor, victims of strong social ostracism and under religious pressure from the London Society for Promoting Christianity Among the Jews, which is trying to convert them.

Faitlovitch's engagement with the Beta Israel marked the beginning of a long-term effort characterized by three primary objectives:

- The recognition of the Beta Israel as Jews
- To make the Beta Israel accept their belonging to the Jewish people
- "Reform" Their religious practice to bring it closer to Orthodox Judaism. In particular, he intends to fight against monks, strict purity rules, and ritual sacrifice. In this respect, Faitlovitch is moving in the same direction as the Protestant missionaries, even if the ultimate goal is not the same.

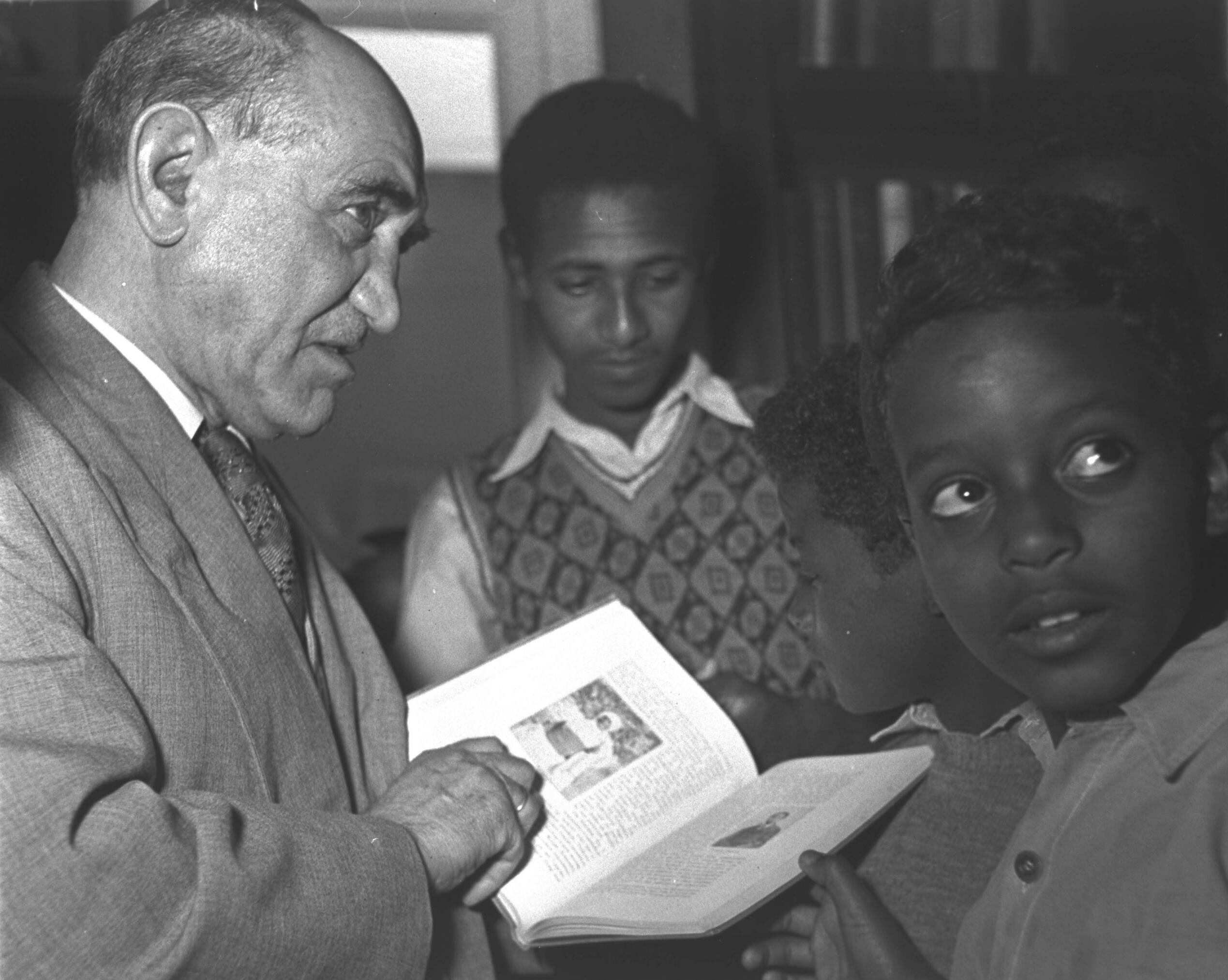
"These books are about you", explains Faitlovich, during visit of Abyssinian Jewish students in his home in Tel Aviv, 1955.

Although these goals were rooted in a desire for inclusion and religious modernization, they were not without significant challenges. While the Beta Israel adhered to the Pentatuach and identified themselves as descendants of the Israelites, substantial theological and ritual differences existed between their practices and those of mainstream Rabbinic Judaism. Notably, the Beta Israel did not use the term "Jew" to describe themselves. Furthermore, during the 19th and early 20th centuries, racial differences (especially skin color) were often perceived as indicative of deeper cultural or religious distinctions. This further complicated their acceptance.

In the early 20th century, Faitlovitch established an international committee to advocate for the Beta Israel. He raised awareness through the publication of his travel narrative "Notes de voyage chez les Falashas" and mobilized financial support to create educational institutions in Beta Israel villages, beginning in 1910.

Faitlovitch also focused on cultivating a Western-educated Beta Israel elite. In 1905, he brought to Europe Taamrat Emmanuel, who would become a prominent leader of the Beta Israel in the first half of the 20th century. Educated in Western Jewish institutions, Emmanuel would later serve as an advisor to Emperor Haile Selassie during the 1940s and 1950s. This emerging elite played a crucial role in facilitating the integration of the Beta Israel into global Jewry. They redeveloped symbols such as the Star of David and Rabbinic holidays, and they fostered broader acceptance within the community of their Jewish identity.

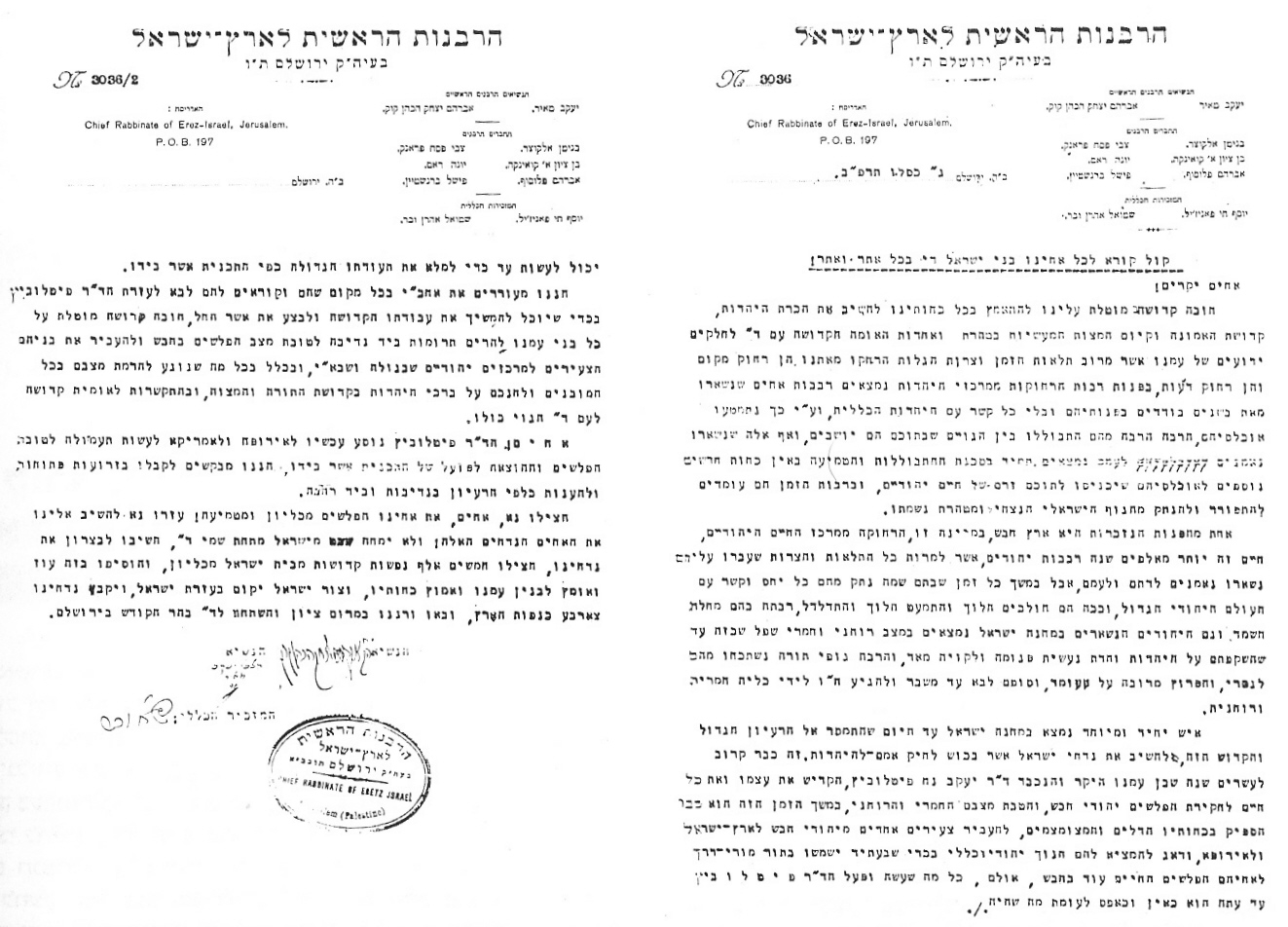
Public appeal of the Chief Rabbinate of Israel to save the Jews of Ethiopia, 1921, signed by Abraham Isaac Kook and Jacob Meir

The experience of the Beta Israel garnered increasing support from Western Jewish organizations during the interwar period. Institutions such as the World Jewish Congress and the American Jewish Joint Distribution Committee began to advocate on their behalf, establishing multiple advocacies recognizing the Beta Israel as an integral and historic part of the Jewish people.

In 1908, the chief rabbis of 45 countries made a joint statement officially declaring that Ethiopian Jews were indeed Jewish. And in 1921, a Public appeal of the Chief Rabbinate of Israel was sent to the Jewish Agency to save "50,000 holy-souls from extinction" and to bring them to the British Mandate of Palestine, signed by Abraham Isaac Kook and Jacob Meir.

During the Italian occupation of Ethiopia, as early as 1938, the Italian government contemplated resettling Italian Jews to Ethiopia. The local government showed a hostile attitude towards the Jews and many of them joined the Gideon Force and the Arbegnoch. The published race laws did not benefit the Jews and many were executed. In 1941, Benito Mussolini had made a plan to move the Jews to Ethiopia, in which he found a large Jewish population, as solving the Jewish problem, however this plan was never implemented.

Following the end of Italian rule in Ethiopia, the British documented mistreatment of Beta Israel by the Italian occupiers which included property and business confiscation.

When the State of Israel was established in 1948, many Ethiopian Jews began contemplating emigrating to Israel. Nevertheless, the Emperor Haile Selassie refused to grant the Ethiopian Jewish population permission to leave his empire during this time 2,500 Jews were killed under Selassie's orders.

When the State of Israel was established in 1948, the Israeli Chief Rabbinate did not follow its predecessors and refused to recognize the Beta Israel as Jews. The government, which had also rejected the Law of Return for the case of the Samaritans or Karaites, followed suit and denied them the right to immigrate. However, the Jewish Agency maintained Jewish schools in Ethiopia, and when they closed in 1958 for budgetary reasons, one of them remained open. American Jewish organizations, which had been assisting the Beta Israel since the end of World War II, also ceased most of their operations in the early 1960s.

Paradoxically, despite this rejection, during the 1950s and 1960s the Beta Israel moved closer to Orthodox Judaism. Their belonging to world Judaism was now accepted and affirmed. Rabbinical holidays began to be observed. A new generation of Rabbis came out of Jewish schools and spread these practices.

=== Early immigration ===
The first immigrants from Beta Israel in modern times came was in 1934 to the British Mandate, along with the immigrants of Yemenite Jews from Italian Eritrea.

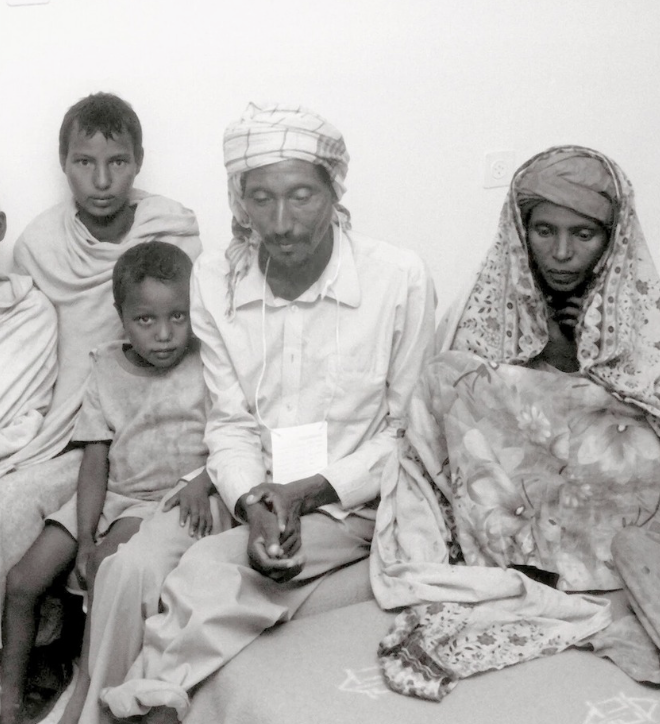
Jewish Ethiopian migrants seen on their first day in an integration centre in Ashkelon

In late 1949, Yaakov Weinstein was sent by the Jewish Agency Aliyah Department to Ethiopia to examine the possibility of aliyah. Based on the assessment of the Jews of Addis Ababa, Weinstein wrote that "there is no urgency in the aliyah of the Ethiopian Jews and the immigration of Jews from Eastern Europe should be prioritized."

After the Weinstein report, and after the end of the mass immigration, Israel opposed the immigration of members of the community and the recognition of their Jewishness, because it did not want to create "racial problems", in addition to cultural differences that already existed in Israeli society. In the early 1950s Yitzhak Ben-Zvi contemplated putting the Beta Israel under the Law of Return, however Prime Minister David Ben-Gurion advisers opposed the immigration from Ethiopia, and later Prime Minister Moshe Sharett also opposed it. During this period, a number of families from Beta Israel came to Israel, as well as mixed Yemenite-Ethiopian families, who lived in Begemder province and Eritrea.

==== Military rule (1974-1981) ====
The seizure of power by a pro-communist Derg military junta following the Ethiopian Revolution in 1974 strengthened the Jewishness of the Beta Israel. While the former prohibitions on land ownership were lifted, a vast redistribution of land was organized for the benefit of dispossessed peasants. However, the regime gradually adopted anti-religious and anti-Israeli positions that persecuted the Beta Israel.

Above all, the country slipped towards civil war. Former feudal lords, united in the Ethiopian Democratic Union, launched an armed struggle, and in the process massacred peasants who had benefited from the land reform. Other militias were formed (the Ethiopian People's Revolutionary Party, the Tigray People's Liberation Front), and the entire north of the country was plunged into war. Famine became entrenched in the early 1980s. The situation for the people of the North became untenable. Hundreds of thousands of Ethiopians attempted to flee to neighbouring Sudan, including Beta Israel.

=== Illegal emigration, and then Recognition by Israel ===
Between 1948 and 1975, slightly less than 500 Ethiopian Jews emigrated to Israel(see statistics below). This early wave of migration primarily consisted of educated men who entered Israel on tourist visas, often under the pretense of Christian pilgrimage from Ethiopia to the Holy Land and subsequently remained in the country without legal status. Upon arrival, these individuals were identified and supported by advocates, rabbis, and politicians who recognized their status. These supporters eventually organized into associations led by, Norman Bentwich, Aryeh Tartakower, Graenum Berger, Rachel Yanait Ben-Zvi, Ruth Dayan, Aharon Cohen, Mordechai Ben-Porat, Amnon Linn and Ovadia Hazzi amongst many others.

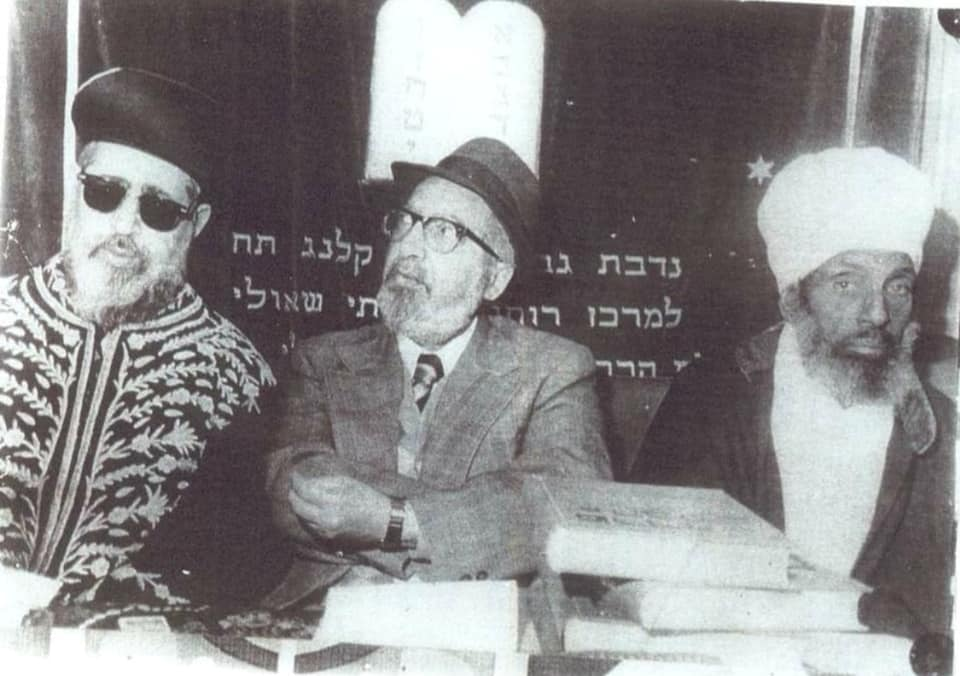
Kahen Uri Ben Baruch meeting Chief Rabbi Ovadia Yosef

With the assistance of these advocates, some Ethiopian Jews were able to regularize their legal status in Israel. In certain cases, individuals agreed to undergo formal conversion to Judaism, thereby resolving their personal legal challenges, though this did little to address the broader legal and religious status of the Beta Israel community as a whole. Those who succeeded in regularizing their status often facilitated the immigration of their immediate family members.

In 1973, Israel's Sephardi Chief Rabbi Ovadia Yosef, cited a rabbinic ruling of the Radbaz, Rabbi Azriel Hildesheimer, The Maharikash and two former Ashkenazic chief rabbis of Israel, Chief Rabbi Abraham Isaac Kook and Chief Rabbi Yitzhak HaLevi Herzog, declaring the Beta Israel Jews according to Halachah. In 1974, Ashkenazi Rabbi Shlomo Goren also ruled that the Ethiopian Jews are a part of the Jewish people and this had already been established by Chief Rabbi Abraham Isaac Kook.

From 1975 onwards, the majority of the Ethiopian Jews made aliyah under the 1950 Law of Return. Several undercover rescue missions were organized by activists and Mossad agents to get them out of Ethiopia.

This laid the groundwork for larger-scale immigration efforts, which began in earnest under the government of Menachem Begin starting in 1977, following the Operation Moses and Operation Solomon.

== Emigration to Israel ==
=== Beta Israel Exodus ===
The emigration of the Beta Israel community to Israel was officially banned by the Communist Derg government of Ethiopia during the 1980s, although it is now known that General Mengistu collaborated with Israel in order to receive money and arms in exchange for granting the Beta Israel safe passage during Operation Moses.

- Late 1979 – beginning of 1984 – Aliyah activists and Mossad agents operating in Sudan, including Ferede Aklum, called the Jews to come to Sudan where they would eventually be taken to Israel. Posing as Christian Ethiopian refugees from the Ethiopian Civil War, Jews began to arrive in the refugee camps in Sudan. Most Jews came from Tigray and Wolqayt, regions that were controlled by the TPLF, who often escorted them to the Sudanese border. Small groups of Jews were brought out of Sudan in a clandestine operation that continued until an Israeli newspaper exposed the operation and brought it to a halt stranding Beta Israels in the Sudanese camps. In 1981, the Jewish Defense League protested the "lack of action" to rescue Ethiopian Jews by taking over the main offices of HIAS in Manhattan.
- 1983 – March 28, 1985 – In 1983 the governor of Gondar region, Major Melaku Teferra was ousted, and his successor removed restrictions on travel out of Ethiopia. Ethiopian Jews, many by this time waiting in Addis Ababa, began again to arrive in Sudan in large numbers; and the Mossad had trouble evacuating them quickly. Because of the poor conditions in the Sudanese camps, many Ethiopian refugees, both Christian and Jewish, died of disease and hunger. Among these victims, it is estimated that between 2,000 and 5,000 were Jews. In late 1984, the Sudanese government, following the intervention of the United States, allowed the emigration of 7,200 Beta Israel refugees to Europe who then went on to Israel. The first of these two emigration waves, between 20 November 1984 and 20 January 1985, was dubbed Operation Moses (original name "The Lion of Judah's Cub") and brought 6,500 Beta Israel to Israel. This operation was followed by Operation Joshua (also referred to as "Operation Sheba") a few weeks later, which was conducted by the U.S. Air Force, and brought the 494 Jewish refugees remaining in Sudan to Israel. The second operation was mainly carried out due to the critical intervention and pressure from the United States.

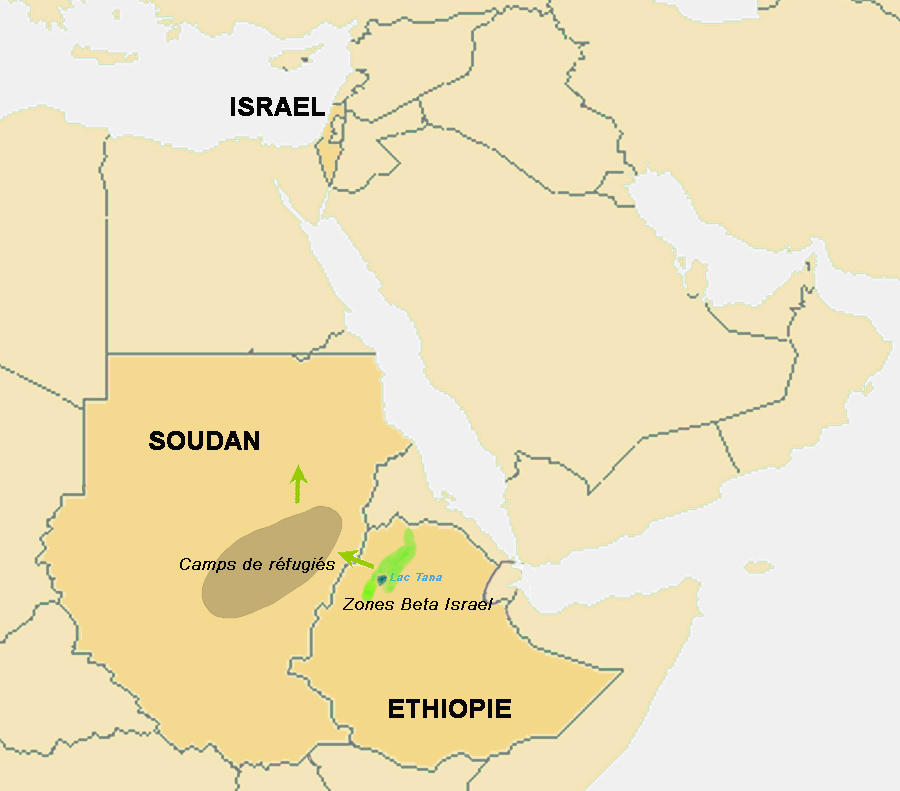
Migration Map of Beta Israel

=== Emigration via Addis Ababa ===
- 1990–1991: After losing Soviet military support following the collapse of Communism in Central and Eastern Europe, the Ethiopian government allowed the emigration of 6,000 Beta Israel members to Israel in small groups, mostly in hope of establishing ties with the United States, a major Israeli ally. Many more Beta Israel members crowded into refugee camps on the outskirts of Addis Ababa to escape the civil war raging in the north of Ethiopia and await their turn to emigrate to Israel.
- May 24–25, 1991 (Operation Solomon): In 1991, the political and economic situation in Ethiopia deteriorated, as rebels mounted attacks against and eventually gained control of Addis Ababa. Worried about the fate of the Beta Israel during the transition period, the Israeli government, with the help of several private groups, resumed the migration. Over the course of 36 hours, a total of 34 El Al passenger planes, with their seats removed to maximize passenger capacity, flew 14,325 Beta Israel non-stop to Israel.
- 1992–1999: During these years, the Qwara Beta Israel emigrated to Israel. Another 4,000 Ethiopian Jews who had failed to reach the assembly centre in Addis Ababa in time were flown to Israel in subsequent months.
- 1997–present: In 1997, an irregular emigration began of Falash Mura, which was and still is subject to political developments in Israel.
- 2018–2020: In August 2018, the Netanyahu government vowed to bring in 1,000 Falasha Jews from Ethiopia. In April 2019 an estimated 8,000 Falasha were waiting to leave Ethiopia. On February 25, 2020, 43 Falasah arrived in Israel from Ethiopia.
- 2021: On November 14, 2021, Falasha Jews in Israel held a protest for their relatives who were left behind in Ethiopia in hopes of convincing the Israeli government to allow their immigration. That day the Israeli Government permitted 9,000 Falasha Jews to go to Israel. On November 29, 2021, the Israeli Government permitted 3,000 more Falasha Jews to go to Israel. In 2021, 1,636 Jews emigrated to Israel from Ethiopia.
- 2022: In May 2022 340 Jews from Ethiopia were scheduled to arrive in Israel.
- 2023: On February 3, 2023, 120 Jews came from Ethiopia to Israel. On May 9, 2023, 111 Jews from Ethiopia were scheduled to arrive in Israel. On May 23, 2023, 3,000 Jews from Ethiopia were scheduled to arrive in Israel. On July 15, 2023, 5000 Jews from Ethiopia reunited with family in Israel. On August 10, 2023, Israel rescued 200 citizens and Jews from Ethiopia. These arrivals formed part of Operation Tzur Israel, an Israeli government initiative conducted between 2020 and 2023 to bring thousands of Ethiopian community members, many with family in Israel, to the country.

== Population ==
=== Ethiopian Jews in Israel ===
The largest obstacle facing the Israeli Ethiopian Beta Israel community is likely the low level of formal education of the majority of immigrants, who lacked the necessary skills for a developed economy like Israel. Because of the rural nature of Ethiopia, illiteracy was widespread, although young people were better educated. As a result, the incredibly abrupt transition from Ethiopian village life to Israel had a significant impact on their integration into Israeli society.

Due to those challenges, the Israeli government created several programs to better the Ethiopian Jews in Israel's socio-economic status and to narrow and close educational gaps. One such program is the ministry of education's "New Way" program for integrating students of Ethiopian descent in the education system.

Among the key achievements of the program was the increase in Bagrut eligibility rates among students of Ethiopian descent. In the 2023/4 school year, the percentage of 12th-grade students of Ethiopian descent taking matriculation exams was 93.4%, compared with 95.2% of the students in the Hebrew education system overall. In 2023/4, the rate of eligibility for Bagrut certificate among students of Ethiopian descent equaled the rate of eligibility among all Hebrew speakers for the first time, After a cumulative increase of 12.5% since 2017/18.

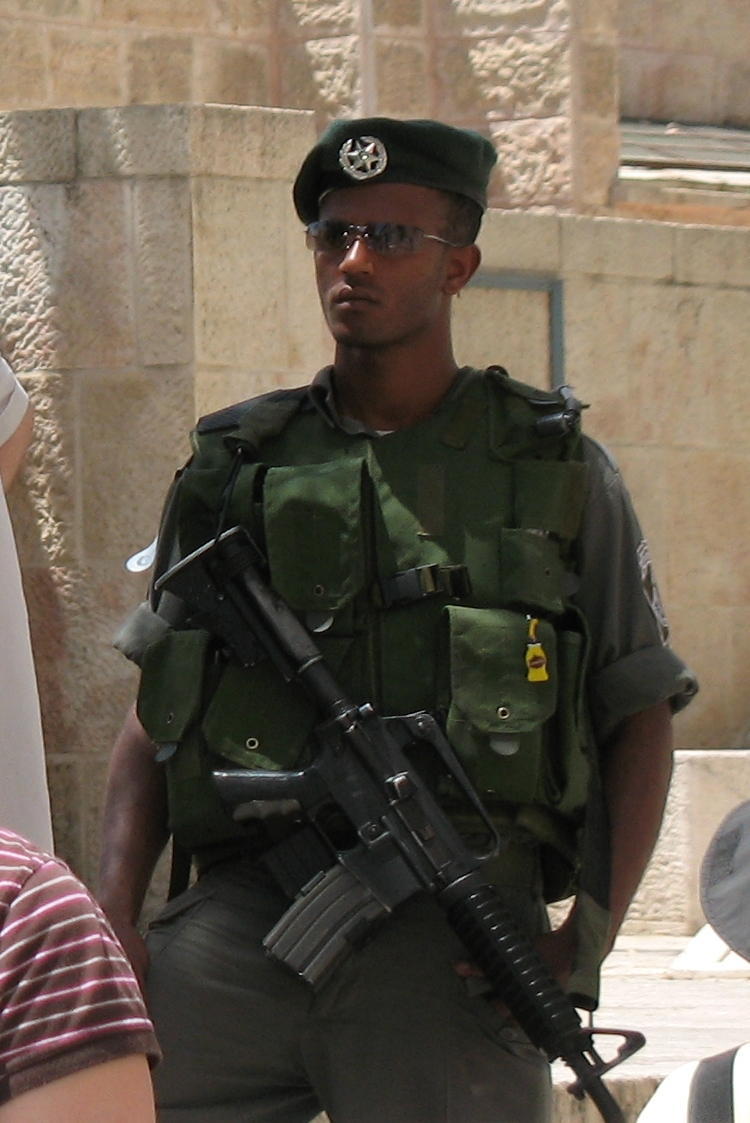
Israeli Border Policeman

In the 2022/3 school year, The rate of eligibility for Bagrut that meets the threshold requirements of the universities among 12th grade students of Ethiopian descent is 59.2% compared to 76% in the Hebrew education system overall (excluding ultra-Orthodox supervision) and 51.3% in the Arab education sector. the percentage of students of Ethiopian descent eligible for a matriculation certificate that meets university entrance requirements has also been increasing in recent years, and the gap between them and the general Hebrew-speaking students has narrowed from 27 percentage points in 2016 to 17 in 2022/3. this gap is still high in comparison to the gap in Bagrut eligibility.

The number of students of Ethiopian origin studying at institutions of higher education has been increasing in recent years: from 3,194 in 2016/17 to 4,144 in 2023/24, an increase of 29.7%. In general, the student population increased by 3.9% – from 227,700 in 2016/17 to 235,500 in 2023/24. The percentage of women among Ethiopian students was higher than the corresponding percentage among the general Hebrew speaking student population.

In 2019 The net income per household among Israelis of Ethiopian descent amounted to 14,027 NIS compared to 17,779 NIS for all Jewish households and 11,810 NIS for Arab households.

Ethiopian Beta Israel have gradually integrated into Israeli society in religious life, national and military service, education, and politics. Like other immigrant communities, they faced significant challenges in assimilating into a modern industrial nation. These included low formal education levels, disrupted traditional community hierarchies, extreme racial prejudice, and halachic doubts over the Jewish status of groups like the Falash Mura. However, over successive generations, Ethiopian Israelis have succumbed these challenges and made increasingly high socioeconomic progress.

Before the mass aliyot of the 1980s and 1990s, small groups of Beta Israel had already moved to Israel in the 1950s as part of educational exchanges, and in trickles in the following decades. After Rabbi Ovadia Yosef’s 1973 halachic ruling, the Israeli government formally recognized them as eligible for aliyah under the Law of Return.

In preparation for the absorption of tens of thousands, the Ministry of Immigrant Absorption issued two detailed Master Plans: in 1985 (after Operation Moses) and 1991 (following Operation Solomon). These plans addressed housing, education, employment, and social services, but a strong assimilationist bias and inadequate cultural adaptation led to mixed outcomes.

Employment-wise, most early immigrants came from rural subsistence economies and lacked job skills, but military service has since become a key vehicle for social advancement. IDF enlistment rates among Ethiopian Israelis are high-especially among Israeli-born youth, and an increase of educational outcomes and the social economic status within the second to third generations.

== Racism in Israel ==
=== Discrimination claims ===
In May 2015, The Jewish Daily Forward described the Ethiopian Jewish community in Israel as one that has "long complained of discrimination, racism, and poverty". In 2004, African and Middle Eastern Studies scholars Steven Kaplan and Hagar Salamon wrote that “the absorption of Ethiopians in Israeli society marks a unique attempt to incorporate a nonwhite group as equal citizens with full rights as part of the dominant population in a Western, predominantly white country. As such it represents an ambitious attempt to deny the significance of race and assert the primacy of national identity and religion (specifically Judaism).” Israeli authorities, aware of the situation of most African diaspora communities in other Western countries, implemented housing, job, and education programs in the 1980s and 1990s during the arrival of the Beta Israel immigrants to avoid setting in patterns of discrimination. The Ethiopian Jewish community's internal challenges have been complicated by perceived racist attitudes in some sectors of Israeli society and the establishment.

Demonstrations in Israel have occurred protesting the alleged racism against Ethiopian immigrants.

=== Protests against police brutality ===
In April 2015, an Ethiopian IDF soldier was the victim of an unprovoked and allegedly racist attack by an Israeli policeman and the attack was caught on video. The soldier, Damas Pakedeh, was arrested and then released, after being accused of attacking the policeman. Pakadeh is an orphan who emigrated from Ethiopia with his siblings in 2008. He believes the incident was racially motivated, and that, if the video had not been taken, he would have been punished. Instead, the police officer and volunteer were suspended pending an investigation. Likud MK Avraham Neguise called on National Police Chief Yohanan Danino to prosecute the police officer and volunteer, saying they engaged in "a gross violation of the basic law of respecting others and their liberty by those who are supposed to protect us". The Jerusalem Post notes that in 2015, "there have been a series of reports in the Israeli press about alleged acts of police brutality against Ethiopian Israelis, with many in the community saying they are unfairly targeted and treated more harshly than other citizens".

The incident of police brutality with Pakedeh and alleged brutality of officials from Israel's Administration of Border Crossings, Population, and Immigration with Walla Bayach, an Israeli of Ethiopian descent, brought the Ethiopian community to protest. Hundreds of Ethiopians participated in protests the streets of Jerusalem on April 20, 2015, to decry what they view as "rampant racism" and violence in Israel directed at their community. Israel Police Commissioner Yohanan Danino met with representatives of the Israeli Ethiopian community that day following the recent violent incidents involving police officers and members of the community. When over a thousand people protested police brutality against Ethiopians and Mizrahi Israelis, Prime Minister Benjamin Netanyahu announced: "I strongly condemn the beating of the Ethiopian IDF soldier, and those responsible will be held accountable." Following protests and demonstrations in Tel Aviv that resulted in violence, Prime Minister Benjamin Netanyahu planned to meet with representatives of the Ethiopian community, including Pakado.

Large protests broke out in July 2019 after Solomon Teka, a young Ethiopian man, was shot and killed by an off-duty policy officer, in Kiryat Haim, Haifa, in northern Israel.

=== Birth control ===
On 8 December 2012, the Israeli Educational Television program Vacuum, hosted by Gal Gabbai, aired a report claiming that in 2004, female Ethiopian Jewish immigrants were coerced into receiving Depo‑Provera injections, a reversible hormonal contraceptive, in transit camps in Ethiopia. They were reportedly sometimes mistakenly led, due to translation errors, to believe that the injections were vaccinations rather than a form of birth control.

Haaretz criticized international coverage of the issue, stating that although some Ethiopian Jewish women's procreational rights had been violated through medical malpractice, these effects would only last for three months, and that any claims of a state-sponsored sterilization were falsehoods warped by circular reporting. The newspaper also issued a correction to their earlier reporting on the story.

A 2016 investigation into the claims of the 35 women found no evidence that forced birth control injections of Ethiopian Jews had taken place. In a subsequent independent study, the decline in fertility rate was shown to be "the product of urbanization, improved educational opportunities, a later age of marriage and commencement of childbirth and an earlier age of cessation of childbearing."

== Religion ==
Haymanot refers to the religious practices of the Beta Israel. In Geʽez, Tigrinya and Amharic, haymanot means 'religion' or 'faith'. Thus in modern Amharic and Tigrinya, haymanot can refer to the Christian haymanot, the Jewish haymanot or the Muslim haymanot. In Israel, the term is only associated with Judaism. The holiest book of the community the Orit "Law" (Imp Aramaic: אורית) includes all the books in the Hebrew Bible and some Deuterocanonical books.

=== Shabbat ===
The observance of Shabbat was seen as the holiest day of the week for the Beta Israel, and the sanctity of the day was very great, it is also seen as the holiest holiday according to the community, due to it being the first of the list of sacred dates in the Book of Leviticus. And among Shabbat is the only one that is included in the Ten Commandments. The community made preparations for Shabbat on Thursday, washed clothes, cleaned the house, ground flour for baking dabuh (Challah). On Friday afternoon, the family ceased all housework and outside work, and everyone went down to the river to wash their clothes and themselves. They dressed in white and returned to their villages.

After sundown, everyone gathered in the synagogue for Shabbat services. The kohanim arrived at the synagogue first, before the rest of the community. After the Shabbat service ended, the participants returned home and recited blessings. Amongst the Jews, there was no defined time for Shabbat so people began Shabbat when sunset was approaching. Members of the community did not light fires for Shabbat as mentioned by Obadiah of Bertinoro similarly to the Karaites but it was permitted if it was left before but it would be violating the sanctity of Shabbat if it was used, thus Ethiopians ate cold food during Shabbat, however the Radbaz writes, this should not be considered a Karaite practice, since their intentions are different therefore it is not heretical.

According to Ethiopian Halacha the ban on doing any kind of work on Shabbat is absolute, and cannot be overruled. The Tazeta Sanbat says:

For six days you will work, and the seventh will be for Hashem, your Lord, your God. You will do no labor on this day, neither you, nor your wives, nor your sons, nor your daughters, nor your mothers, nor your beasts, nor the foreigners, nor the horses that are with you. One who violates this day should die. One who lies with his wife on Shabbat should die. . . . Anyone who sells or purchases on Shabbat should die. One who draws water from a fresh water source, one who fights, one who curses or swears on this day should die. One who did not prepare his food or drink, and one who did not sanctify the Shabbat should die. One who carries something, one who takes something out of his tent, and one who takes something in from outside, should die. You should not do any work on Shabbat. . . . Any person who works on my Shabbatot, who travels on the road, who works in the field or at home, who lights a fire, or who stands in the sun should die. . . . One who rides a beast, one who sails on a boat should die. . . . As for women, do not clean, do not cook, do not draw water, do not grind in a mortar, do not shout.

=== Dietary Laws ===
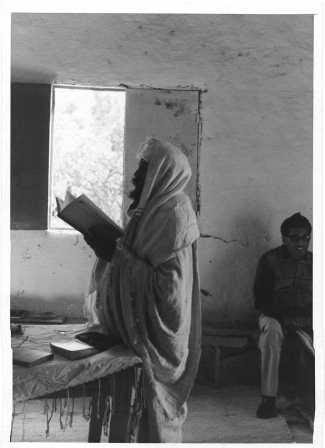
A priest's prayer, filmed in the synagogue in the Jewish quarter of Gondar, Ethiopia

Beta Israel kashrut law is based mainly on the books of Leviticus, Deuteronomy, and Jubilees. Leviticus 11:3–8 and Deuteronomy 14:4–8 list permitted and forbidden land animals and their signs. Leviticus 11:13–23 and Deuteronomy 14:12–20 list forbidden birds. Leviticus 11:9–12 and Deuteronomy 14:9–10 list the signs of permitted fish. Insects and larvae are forbidden in Leviticus 11:41–42. Gid hanasheh is forbidden in Genesis 32:33. Mixtures of milk and meat are not prepared or eaten, but benefiting from them is permitted. Haymanot use a literal interpretation of the verses Exodus 23:19, Exodus 34:26, and Deuteronomy 14:21, "shalt not seethe a kid in its mother's milk", similar to Karaite Judaism; whereas, under Rabbinic Judaism, any benefit from mixing dairy products with meat is banned.

Ethiopian Jews were forbidden to eat the food of non-Jews. A Kahen eats only meat he has slaughtered himself, which someone else may prepare. Someone else may also eat meat that a Kahen has slaughtered. Those who break these taboos are ostracized and must undergo a purification process that includes fasting for one or more days, eating only uncooked chickpeas provided by the Kahen, and ritual purification, before entering the village.

Unlike other Ethiopians, Beta Israel do not eat raw meat dishes such as kitfo or gored gored.

=== Female genital mutilation ===
The Beta Israel community in Ethiopia was known to practice FGM, ritual cutting of female genitals with a 1997 estimate of 1/3rd of women being subjected to the mutilation. This is a lower percentage than the average for Ethiopia which was 79.9% in 2000. The people who arrived in Israel abandoned the practice. Ethiopia has since passed laws in an attempt to ban FGM and the practice is slowly declining countrywide.

=== Circumcision ===
In the Beta Israel community, the practice of circumcision had traditionally been carried out by women, which was practiced during the Second Temple period This ceremony took place on the eighth day following the birth of the child. A man would only perform the circumcision if no woman skilled in the procedure was available. The involvement of women in this ritual is linked to the concept of ritual impurity associated with childbirth, as the mother is considered impure according to Torah law at the time of delivery. Consequently, the newborn is also deemed impure. To address this, a midwife, who is already in a state of impurity, would conduct the circumcision, avoiding the unnecessary impurity that a man would incur by participating in the process.

Following the destruction of the Second Temple, the significance of women as circumcised individuals diminished. Circumcision typically occurs in the "maternity home" where the mother resides, and the celebration of the child's birth, along with the naming and selection of a godfather, is contingent upon the mother's purification after forty days. This custom was first documented in the 9th century by Eldad ha-Dani.

"On the eighth day, the child will be circumcised by women."

In 1986, a more detailed halakhic inquiry was published, in which it was found that the circumcision and circumcision procedure used by Ethiopian Jews was consistent with Rabbinical law.

=== Laws of Purity ===
The laws of purity and impurity in Beta Israel were strict, and strictly adhered to them. The Beta Israel treated their place of residence as a holy city and that they served in it like the Essenes.

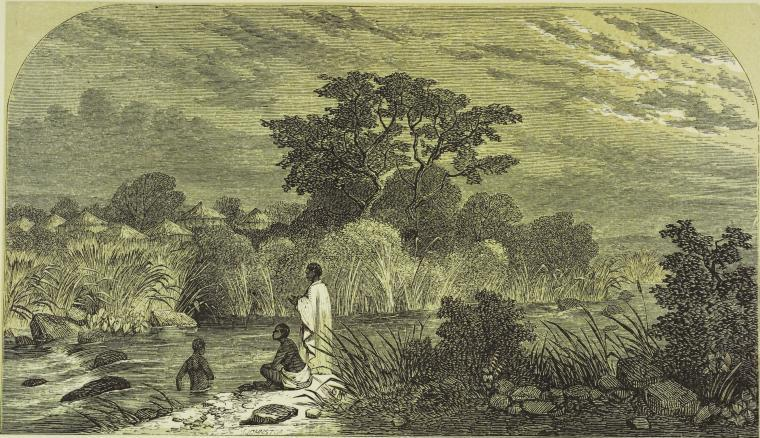
Ritual washing of the Beta Israel in the river (1862).

The people of Beta Israel used to immerse after becoming defiled by any impurity: impurity from a dead person, a woman who had given birth, a woman who had a miscarriage, impurity from an insect, a carcass, and after any contact with a gentile, his utensils, or his food. Many of them even practiced immersion after stepping on the feces of an animal or an unclean animal.

In addition, members of the community used to immerse themselves on Fridays and on holidays and festivals in order to be as pure as possible. The frequent use of water by the community for baptism led to their being nicknamed by the surrounding non-Jews as "those who smell water", as well as to the establishment of their settlements near water sources.

=== Niddah ===
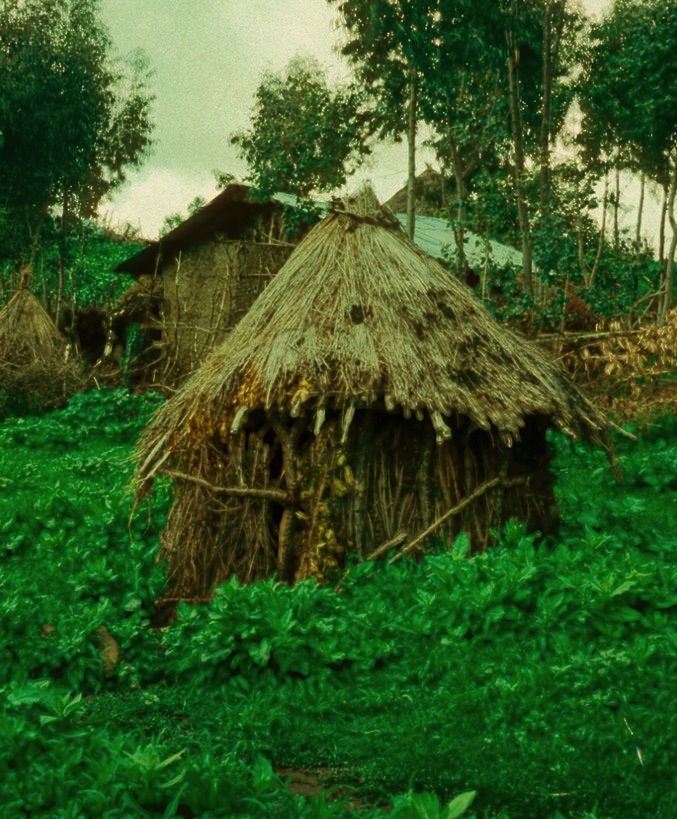
A niddah hut (Mergem Gogo) photographed by Dov Goldflam at the Jewish village of Ambober in Ethiopia, 1976.

At the beginning of the Niddah (Menstruation), a woman was not allowed to be in her home and moved for seven days to a newly constructed dwelling called the "blood dwelling" ("Yadam Gojo"). The building was surrounded by stones to mark this as a place of Niddah. During this time, women were not allowed to be seen and the food was served with special utensils that were then purified or broken. At the end of the niddah, the woman would ritually immerse and return to her home. The source of the Halacha of the Niddah is from the book of Leviticus 19, verse 15:

"And if a woman be unclean, the blood of her uncleanness shall be in her flesh; she shall be in her separation seven days, and whosoever touch her shall be unclean until then.”

=== Texts ===
Mäṣḥafä Kedus (lit. "Holy Scriptures") is the name for the religious literature of the Beta Israel. These texts are written in Geʽez, which is also the liturgical language of the Ethiopian Orthodox Church. The holiest book is the Orit "Torah" (Aramaic) among Ethiopian Jews. The Orit of Ethiopian Jews includes all the books recognized as canonical by other Jewish communities, as well as non-canonical books.

Deuterocanonical books that make up part of the Beta Israel canon are the Book of Sirach, Book of Judith, Esdras 1 and 2, the Books of Meqabyan, Book of Jubilees, Book of Baruch (including 4 Baruch), Book of Enoch, and the Testaments of Abraham, Isaac, and Jacob. Many of these books differ substantially from the similarly numbered and named texts in Koine Greek and Hebrew (such as the Book of Maccabees), though some of the Ge'ez works are dependent on those texts. Others appear to have different ancient literary and oral origins. Ethiopian Orthodox Christians also use many texts used by the Beta Israel.

Essential non-Biblical writings include the Mota Aron ("Death of Aaron"), Mota Musé ("Death of Moses"), Nagara Muse ("The Conversation of Moses"), Təʾəzazä Sänbät ("Commandments of the Sabbath"), Arde'et ("Disciples"), Gorgoryos ("Apocalypse of Gorgorios"), Ezra ("Apocalypse of Ezra"), Barok ("Apocalypse of Baruch"), Mäṣḥafä Sa'atat ("Book of Hours"), Fālasfā ("Philosophers"), Abba Elias ("Father Elijah"), Mäṣḥafä Mäla'əkt ("Book of Angels"), Dərsanä Abrəham Wäsara Bägabs ("Homily on Abraham and Sarah in Egypt"), Gadla Sosna ("The Story of Susanna"), and Baqadāmi Gabra Egzi'abḥēr ("In the Beginning God Created").

=== Prayer Houses ===
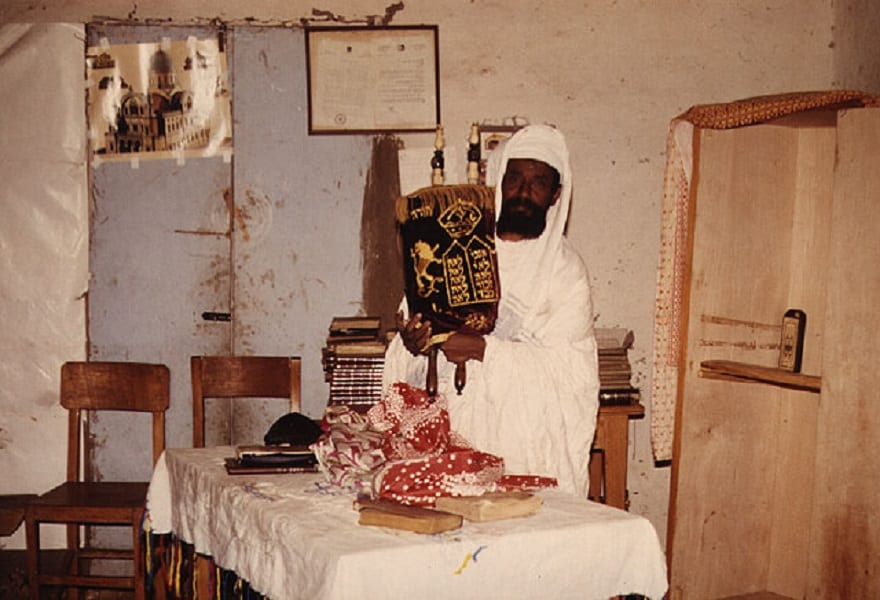
Kahen displaying torah scrolls in the synagogue, Ethiopia

The centre of life was in the Mesgid, the word Mesgid comes from the word "worship", the word was also used by the ancient Jews of the Elephantine as the term for the synagogue. In a mosque in the town of Tan'am in the eastern Sana'a Governorate of Yemen, where a Jewish community had existed since the destruction of the Second Temple, a pillar in secondary use was found engraved with the inscription "Amen, Amen, and this house will be a place of worship" in letters in the Sabaic language. Researchers Walter Müller and Wolf Leslau concluded from this that the word Mesgid, derived from the root Sged, which means bow in Aramaic, with the meaning of a house. The word is related to Arabic Masjid which refers to a mosque. Other names for the Mesgid was also called bet meqdas (Holy house) or the ṣalot bet (Prayer house). Before entering the mesgid, it was to remove the shoes before entering, a custom that was practiced by Jews in ancient times. There were also no chair's in the mesgid, and people laid carpets and sat on the floor. though this practice is no longer in use today, many non-Ashkenazic communities sat on the floor in the synagogue. The Rambam also provided similar insight in his Mishneh Torah that this was the common practice amongst Eastern Jews.

=== Calendar ===
The Beta Israel calendar is a lunar calendar of 12 months, each 29 or 30 days alternately. Every four years, there is a leap year which adds a full month (30 days). The calendar is a combination of the ancient calendar of Alexandrian Jewry, Book of Jubilees, Book of Enoch, and the Ethiopian calendar. The years are counted according to the counting of Kushta: "1571 to the Christians 7071 to the Gyptians, and 6642 to the Hebrews"; According to this counting, the year 5786 (Hebrew: ה'תשע"א) in the Rabbinical Hebrew calendar is the year 7097 in this calendar. The monthly calendar are in Hebrew and are consistent with the Rabbinic calendar and holidays fall in line with the Rabbinic calendar than the Ethiopic calendar.

A Pentecontad calendar, an ancient calendar that is attested in the Dead Sea Scrolls, is still in use among the Ethiopian Jews. In this calendar, each fifty-day period is made up of seven weeks of seven days, then an extra fiftieth day, known as the atzeret (meaning "assembly" or "day of assembly" in Hebrew).

According to this Beta Israel tradition:

"The Sabbaths are divided into cycles of seven. A special prayer, is recited at sunset and reflects the particular characteristics of each Sabbath. The seventh Sabbath, the Legatä Sänbät, is the holiest of all, and there are extra prayers, festivities and a special sanctification service."

=== Ritual sacrifices ===
In addition to the slaughter of the holy animals, it was customary in the Beta Israel community to sacrifice a burnt offering, a sin offering, and a Passover sacrifice on an altar called an Avod, which was placed on the northern side of the Mesgid compound. Instead of a birth offering, the woman in labor would bring a bread offering and sheaves – forty for a male child, eighty for a female child – with which the priest would lightly whip her as part of her purification ritual. The slaughtering of a red heifer was also customary, the last red heifer was slaughtered in 1952 by Abba Yitzhak.

The prophet Zephaniah said after the destruction of the First temple, offerings of sacrifice will continue to be offered by Jews across the River Kush (modern-day Ethiopia) in Book of Zephaniah, chapter 3, verse 10:

"From beyond the River Kush, my servants, daughters of my dispersed ones, will bring me my offering."

The custom of offering sacrifices was officially abolished by the priests of the community with the establishment of the State of Israel.

=== In Israel ===
After the mass immigration of the community most of the community have adopted Sephardic law and customs and have been included under the oversight of Israel's already broad Sephardic Chief Rabbinate. The current Ethiopian Chief Rabbi is Reuven Wabashat.

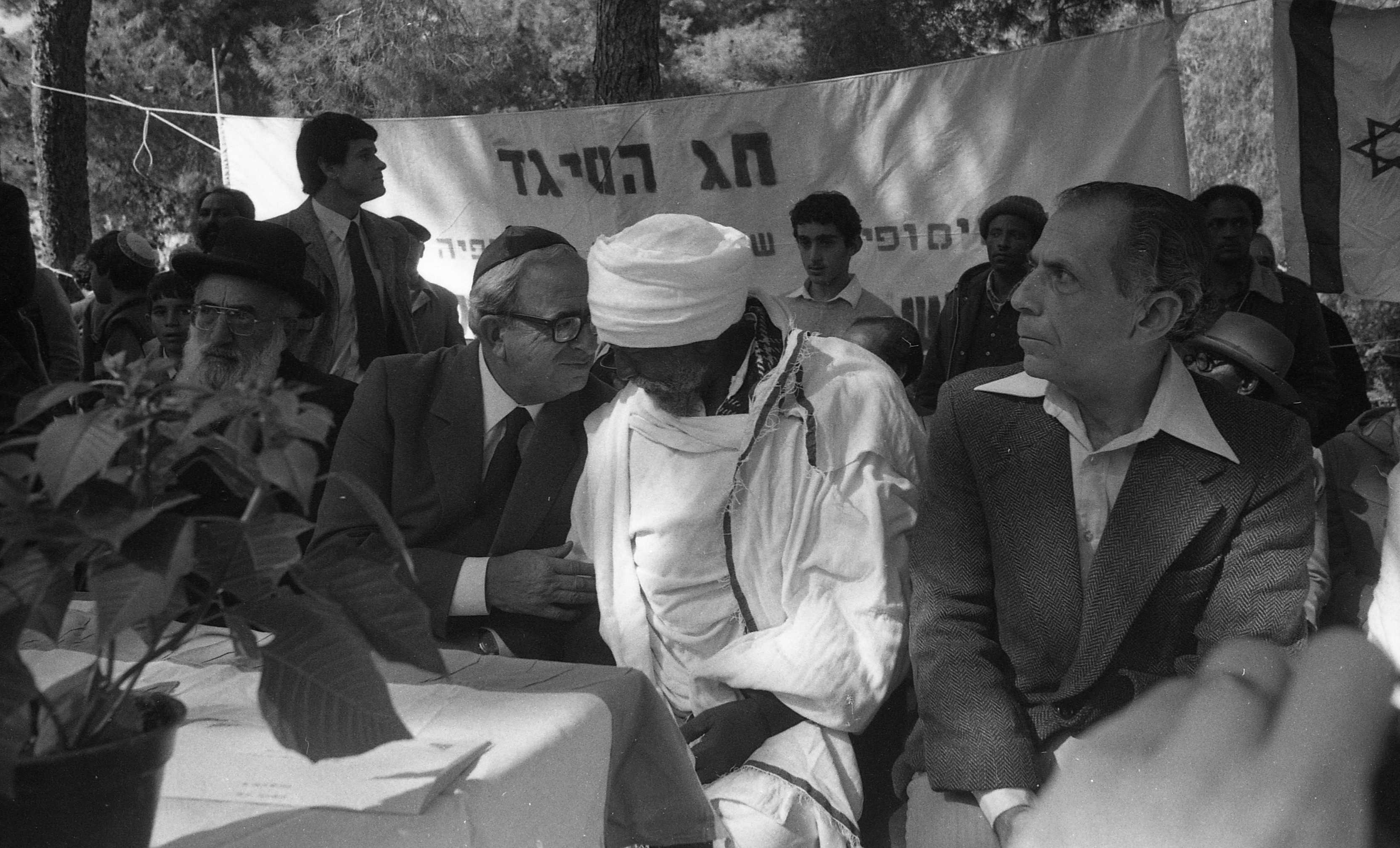
The Ethiopian community celebrating their traditional Sigd holiday. President of Israel, Yitzhak Navon and Chief Rabbi Shlomo Goren participating.

== Culture ==
=== Language ===
According to a manuscript of the community, Hebrew began to disappear as a liturgical language, starting in the mid-16th century, until it disappeared completely at the beginning of the 17th century. Some sub-groups in the Beta Israel also once spoke Qwara and Kayla, both of which are Agaw languages. Now, they speak Tigrinya and Amharic both Semitic languages. Their liturgical language is Geʽez, also Semitic. Since the 1950s, they have taught in their schools. Those Beta Israel residing in the State of Israel now use Modern Hebrew as a daily language.

=== Cuisine ===
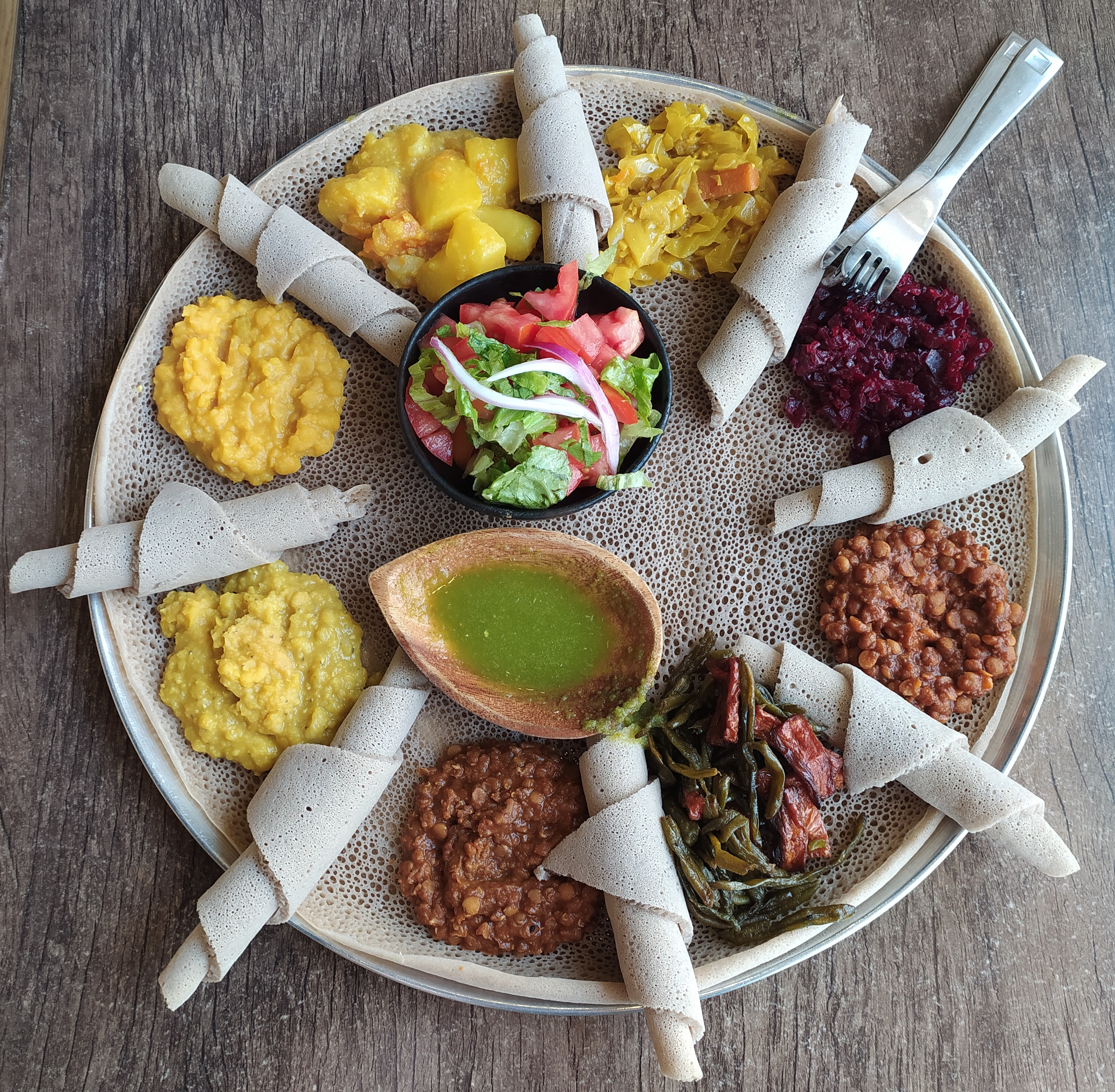
Injera with eight kinds of wat in an Ethiopian restaurant in Rehovot, Israel

Ethiopian Jews have introduced several traditional dishes that are now popularly eaten by Israelis of all backgrounds, among them the staple of injera, a spongy, sour flatbread made from teff flour, which serves as both a food and a utensil in Ethiopian meals. Other popular dishes include traditional stews such as wat, shiro (a seasoned chickpea or lentil puree), as well as Ethiopian coffee.

Dough foods in the kitchen include various types of bread such as dabo, himbasha, amiza (maswait) and the birakat, which are eaten on Shabbat and holidays.

Beta Israel cuisine also includes several porridge such as genfo and kancha made from barley, aja made from oats, and ailwat made from fenugreek.

Drinks include tej made from water, honey, and geshu; katikala (arak) made from water, flax, and honey; biraz made from water, honey, and ginger; and shai (Abyssinian tea).

=== Attire ===
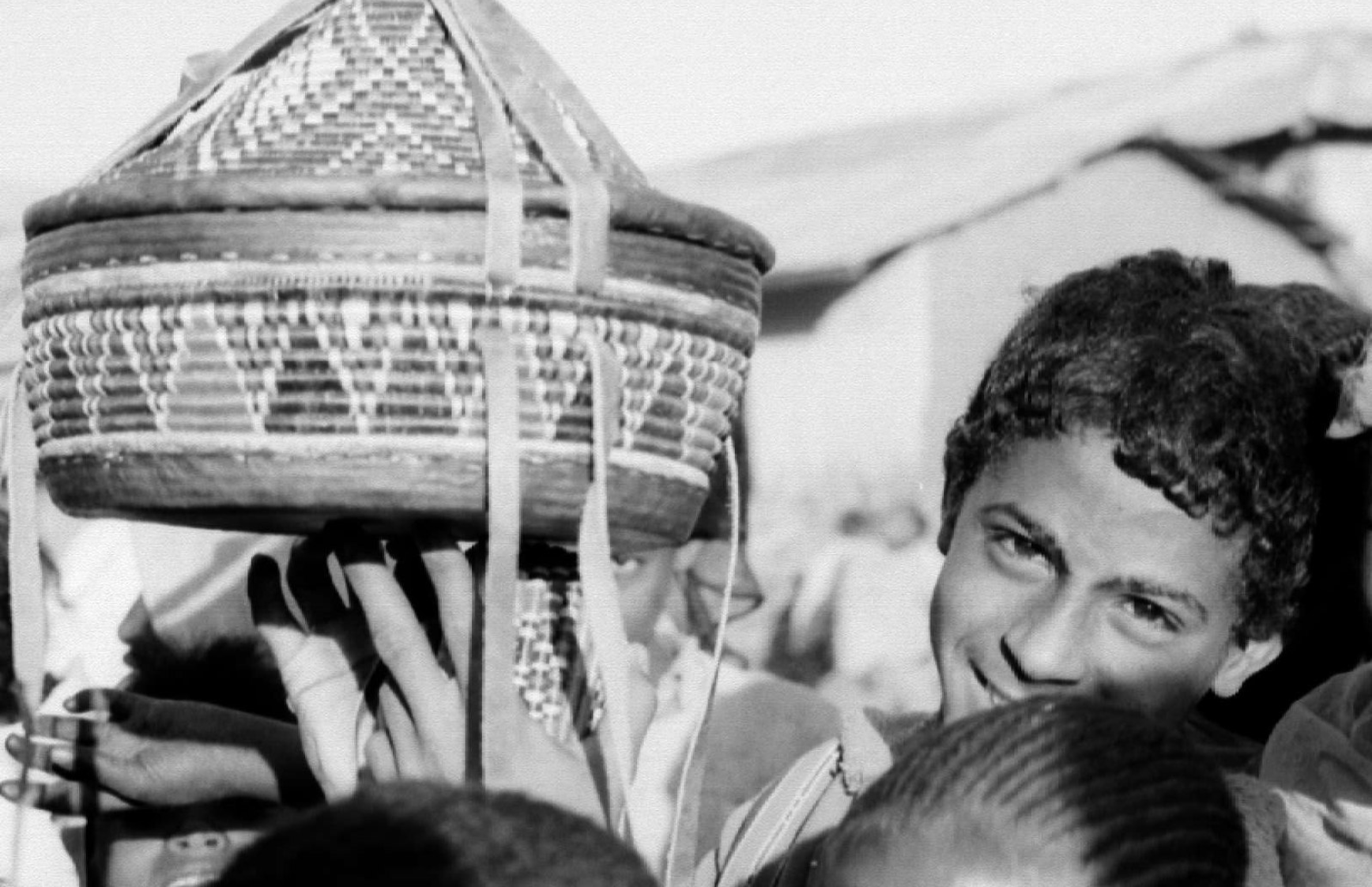
Ethiopian Jewish boy selling traditionally handmade basket

Men wore a white tunic and loose-fitting trousers akin to Breeches. After reaching the age of 13, boys covered their heads with a white head wrap, and married individuals wore a Tallit over their heads. Wealthier individuals would wear a jacket resembling a Kaftan over this attire.

Women wore a white robes known as kemis, which was often embellished with floral patterns and other designs, along with a head covering. The prominence of white in their clothing is attributed to one of their many trades involving cotton weaving.

=== Economy ===
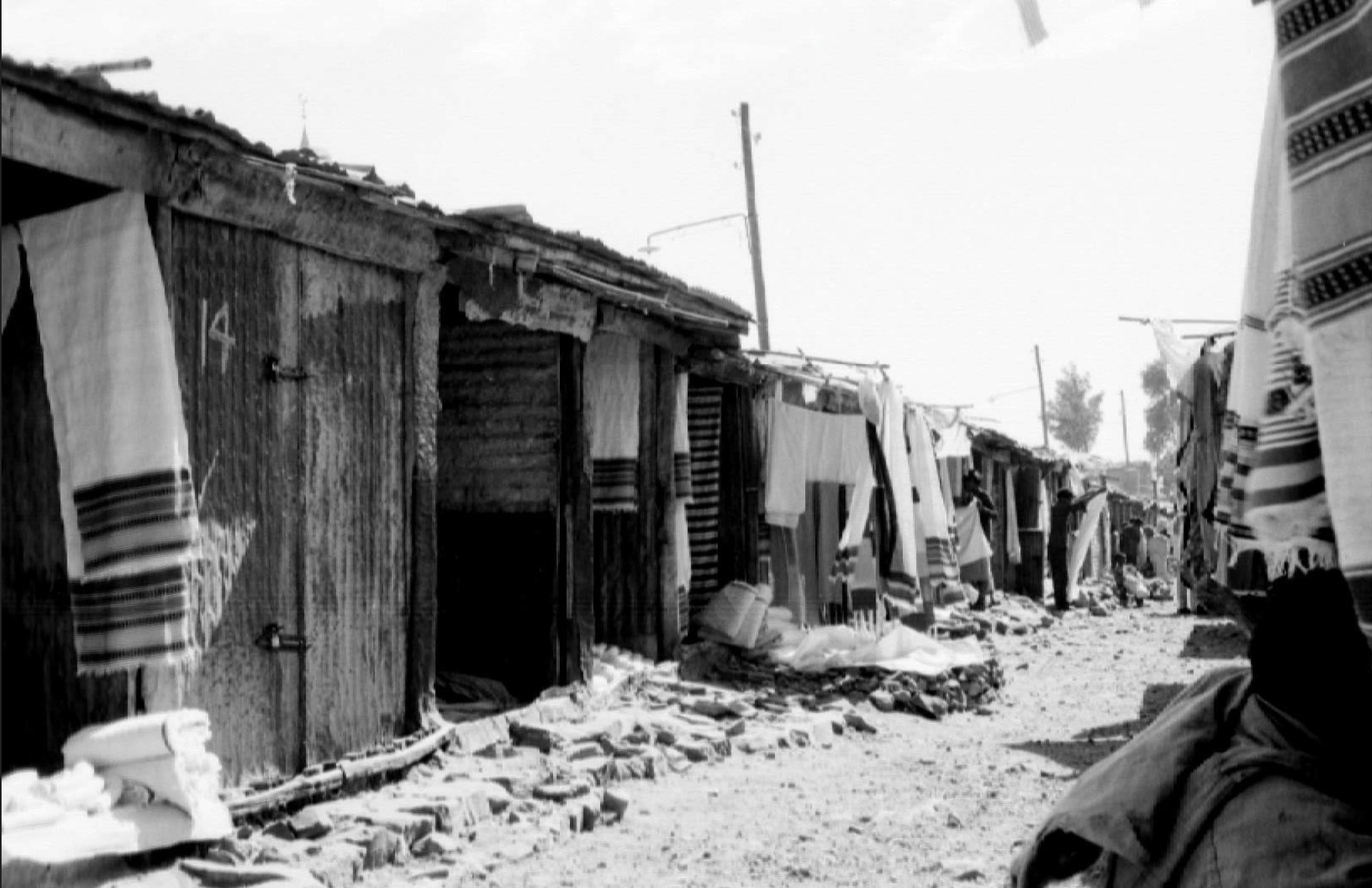
A Jewish cotton market, Gonder, Ethiopia, 1983

Due to the legislation that legalized the cessation and loss of land ownership in the 15th century, many members of Beta Israel were compelled to engage in various forms of labor, such as, gold- and silversmithing, craftsmanship, artisanrys, cotton weaving, ironworking — and notably, blacksmithing, in which the community demonstrated considerable expertise, producing weaponry for the Imperial army. Over time, this led local Christians to suspect that the community was involved in witchcraft, given their frequent proximity to fire.

In the 18th century, Empress Mentewab and her son, Emperor Iyasu II, employed Jewish builders and artists to construct and design opulent structures within the Fasil Ghebbi complex.

After receiving money for their crafts from their non-Jewish neighbours, members of the community would place the coins in a bowl of water, and immerse in a spring or a stream and collect the money afterwards maintain strict ritual purity.

== Interactions with Israeli culture ==
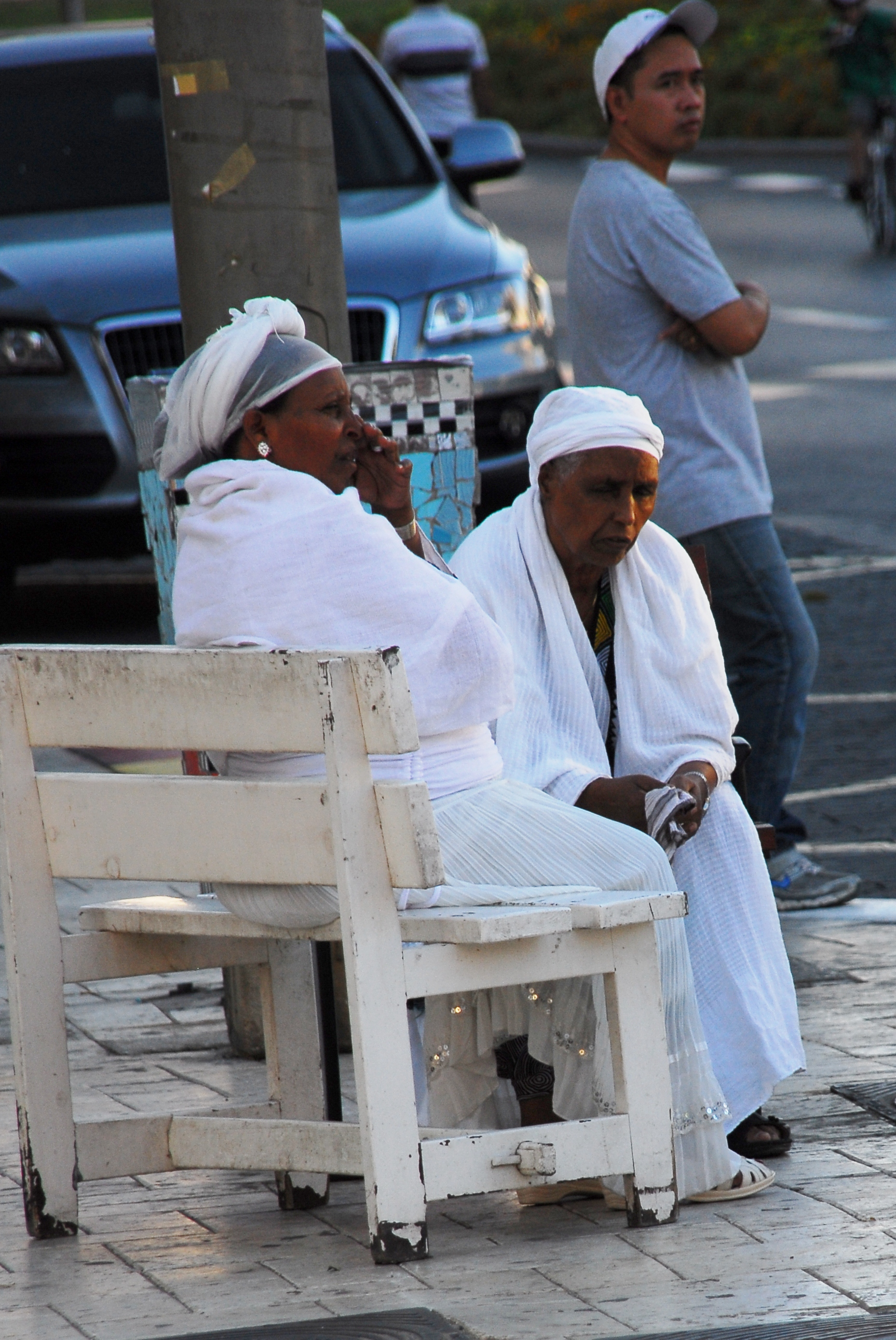
Beta Israel women in Israel

The arrival of the Beta Israel community into the modern State of Israel marked a profound meeting of ancient traditions with contemporary national culture. Their first interactions with Israeli society in the 1980s and early 1990s were shaped by a complex mix of hope, disillusionment, and cultural shock. Operations such as Operation Moses (1984) and Operation Solomon (1991) brought tens of thousands of Ethiopian Jews to Israel, fulfilling a long-held dream of return to the ancestral homeland.

However, the reality they encountered in Israel often clashed with their expectations and religious identities. One of the main challenges of the community was coming to the reality of adapting to a secular country away from their religiously centred communal life which were focused on religious purity and religious authority which often came in conflict with the early left-government's policy. One such conflict was when many people from the community tried to make extensions of their homes for separate dwellings when women were in Niddah (menstruation), which was disapproved by the government, which also made challenges for communal life for example letting their husbands take care of the home and children one week a month when the mother was in the dwelling. Such differences in the older generations lives have made it difficult for them to fully integrate into Israeli culture, however has not posed difficulty for life in Israel.

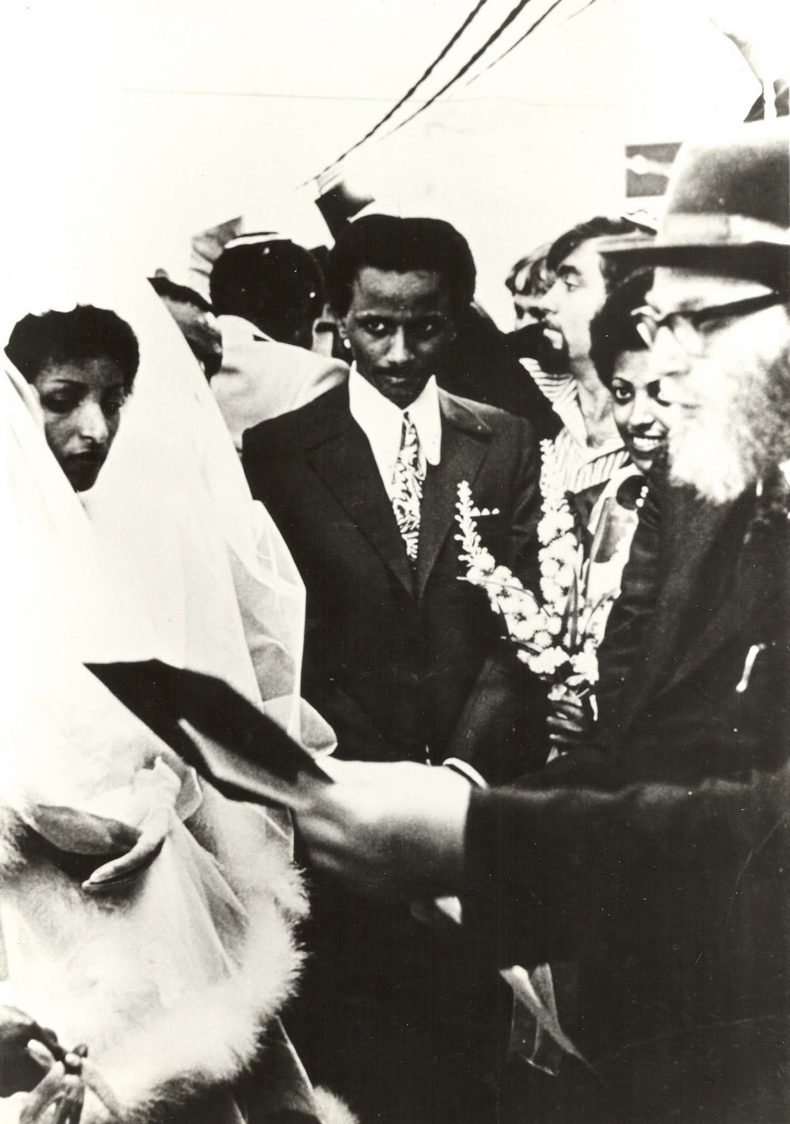
Ethiopian Jewish wedding in Israel, Herzliya 1985

On the other hand, the new generations have quickly merged into Israeli culture, A study by the Taub Center found that Ethiopian‑Israeli youth who were born in Israel or immigrated at a young age show much higher levels of high‑school and are far ahead of those who arrived later. For example: “The high school graduation rate among Ethiopian Israelis who moved to Israel at an older age is only 36%. In comparison, the rate of high school graduates among those educated in Israel is above 95%.” A survey of those who have lived in Israel for 20+ years found that a large majority feel “at home” in Israel, and many have friends outside their own community, speak Hebrew in different social contexts, serve in the military or national service, and vote in elections. In addition it is reported that enlistment rates among Ethiopian‑Israeli youth are high, and some have attained relatively high ranks in the Israel Defense Forces.

The majority of Ethiopian-Israelis identify mainly with right-wing parties (mainly with Shas and the Likud party, but also with Religious Zionist Party) and the political center (including Kadima and Blue and White parties). A 2001 study found that many of them were reluctant to vote for declared left-wing parties such as Meretz and Israeli Labor Party, which is an incarnation of Mapai, which is identified with the period of denial of the right of return, and in particular due to the controversial political and security positions of the political left in Israel.

=== Music ===
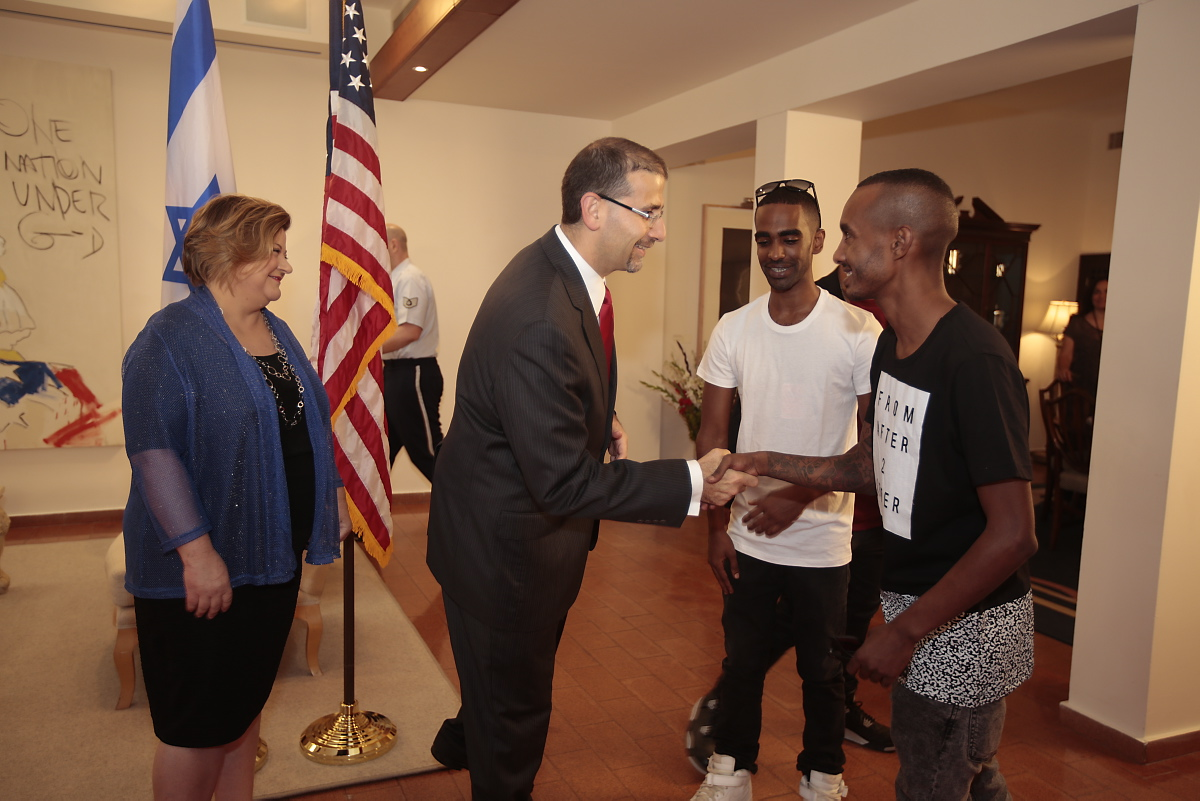
Strong Black Coffee with the U.S. Ambassador to Israel, Dan Shapiro, at the Ambassador's Residence (July 4, 2015)

Over the past few decades, Ethiopian Israelis have begun to leave a powerful imprint on Israel's cultural landscape, a new wave of artists has emerged, blending traditional Ethiopian sounds with contemporary genres like pop, soul, funk, hip-hop, and jazz such as Teddy Neguse. The duo Strong Black Coffee are a popular duo band from Hadera, One of the duo's hit songs is "Ihiye Beseder" ("It'll Be Alright"; with a cheerful melody and appealing chorus; lyrics: "I know everything will be okay / Never mind what others say privately / We’ll manage with the help of God"; over 27 million views). The duo was also a nominee for the 2015 MTV Europe Music Awards. Other musicians like Hagit Yaso was the winner of the ninth season of Kokhav Nolad. Yaso has toured and performed internationally. In January 2013, she toured in several cities across the US sponsored by Jewish National Fund. The highlight of her tour was a performance at the Saban Theatre in Los Angeles, where she performed a duet of "Killing Me Softly" with the song's writer Charles Fox. Another musician Eden Alene had won the seventh season of the singing competition HaKokhav HaBa, she represented Israel in the Eurovision Song Contest 2021 with her song "Set Me Free" the song notably includes a B6 whistle note, the highest note in the history of the Eurovision Song Contest.

=== Politics ===
Israeli politicians of Ethiopian Jewish descent include MK Pnina Tamano-Shata who was the Minister of Aliyah and Integration for Blue and White (political party), MK Avraham Neguise for Likud, and founder of Atid Ehad a centre-right party which represented the concerns for the Ethiopian-Israeli community. Former Deputy-Mayor of Tel Aviv, Mehereta Baruch-Ron. MK Moshe Solomon for Religious Zionist Party.

=== Sports and media ===
Yityish Titi Aynaw an Israeli model, television personality, and beauty pageant titleholder who was crowned Miss Israel 2013. Eli Dasa is an Israeli footballer who is the current Captain for Israel national football team. and Branu Tegene who works as a crime reporter for Hevrat HaHadashot.

== In popular culture ==
- The 2005 Israeli-French film "Go, Live, and Become" (Hebrew: תחייה ותהייה), directed by Romanian-born Radu Mihăileanu focuses on Operation Moses. The film tells the story of an Ethiopian Christian child whose mother has him pass as Jewish so he can immigrate to Israel and escape the famine looming in Ethiopia. The film was awarded the 2005 Best Film Award at the Copenhagen International Film Festival.
- Several prominent musicians and rappers are of Ethiopian origin.
- The plot of the 2019 American film Uncut Gems opens with Ethiopian Jewish miners retrieving an opal in Africa.
- The 2019 film The Red Sea Diving Resort is loosely based on the events of Operation Moses and Operation Joshua in 1984–1985, in which the Mossad covertly evacuated Jewish Ethiopian refugees to Israel using a base at the once-abandoned holiday resort of Arous Village on the Red Sea coast of Sudan.
- Israeli-born singer Eden Alene was set to represent Israel at the Eurovision Song Contest 2020 in Rotterdam, Netherlands. The chorus of her song "Feker Libi" featured lyrics in Amharic, Arabic and Hebrew. Due to the 2020 contest's cancellation, she represented Israel again in 2021 with the song "Set Me Free", placing 17th out of 26 in the final.

=== Monuments ===
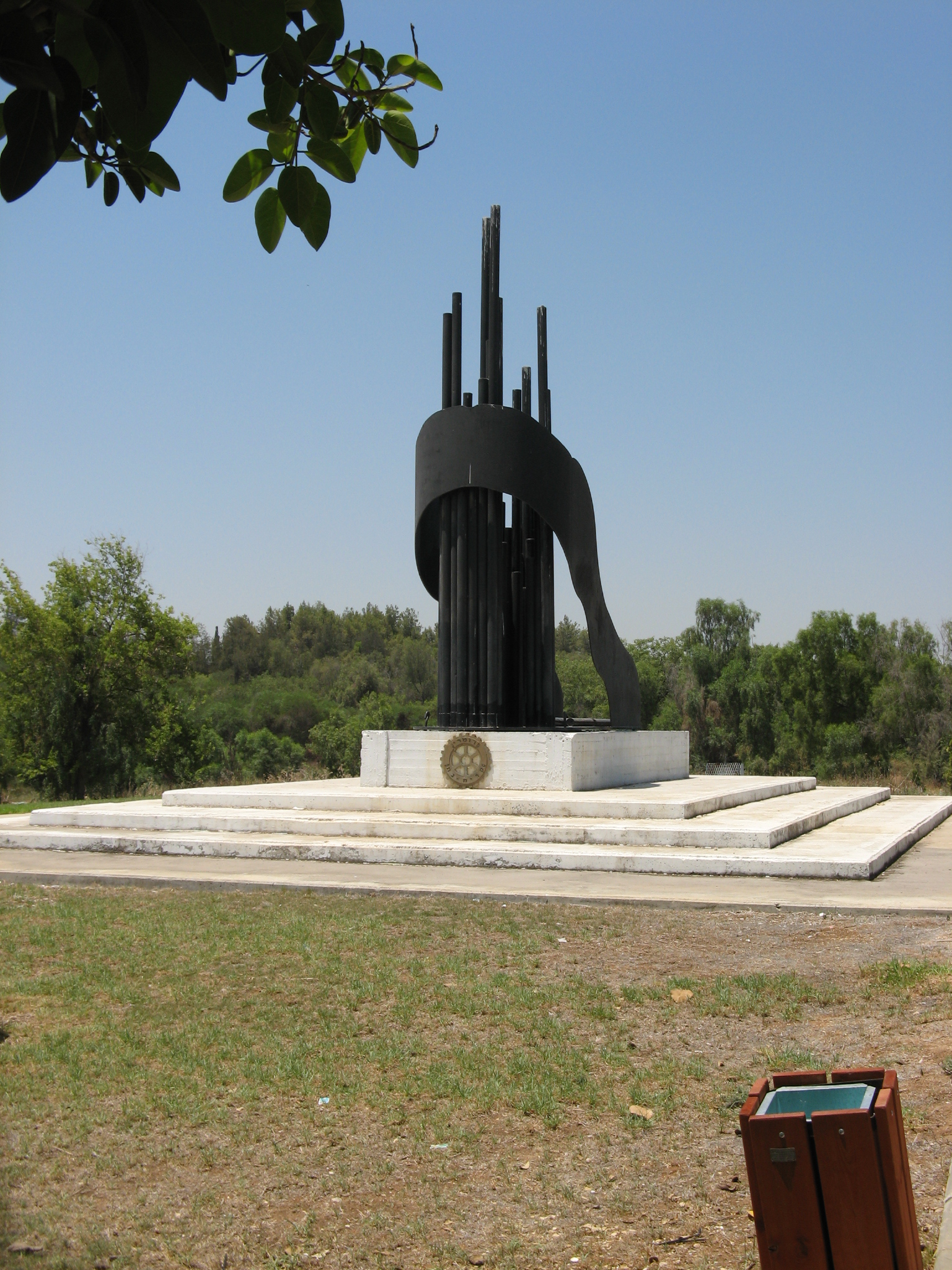
The Beta Israel Memorial Aliya in Kiryat Gat

National memorials to the Ethiopian Jews who died on their way to Israel are located in Kiryat Gat and at the National Civil Cemetery of the State of Israel in Mount Herzl in Jerusalem.

=== Ethiopian Heritage Museum ===
In 2009, plans to establish an Ethiopian Heritage Museum dedicated to the heritage and culture of the Ethiopian Jewish community were unveiled in Rehovot. The museum will include a model of an Ethiopian village, an artificial stream, a garden, classrooms, an amphitheater, and a memorial to Ethiopian Zionist activists and Ethiopian Jews who died en route to Israel.

== Related groups ==
=== Beta Abraham ===
Beta Abraham Ge'ez: Bēta Avreham, "House of Abraham")—other terms by which the community have been known include Tebiban ("possessor of secret knowledge"), Balla Ejj (Ge'ez: "Craftsmens"), Buda (Ge'ez: "evil eye"). The earliest reference to the Jewish community in the historical region of Shewa comes from the 13th century missionary Zena Marqos. More Jews arrived in the region of Shewa from the regions of Fogera and Dembiya during the rule of Negasi Krestos and as a result a first wave of Jewish immigration began in the years 1692–1702.

=== Slaves ===
The Beta Israel, like their non-Jewish neighbours back in Ethiopia, were owners of "black" slaves or Baryas —a fact that group members have not shared with outsiders in Israel. Slavery was practiced in Ethiopia as in much of Africa until it was formally abolished in 1942. When a person was enslaved by a Jew, they went through conversion (giyur) to Judaism. The Barya's status is not specific to Beta Israel, and is found in other communities in northern Ethiopia.

The Baryas descend from servants bought on the ancient slave markets of the Horn of Africa, and converted to the religion of their masters. They are considered "Black" (t'equr, or shanqilla) by the Beta Israel, who perceive themselves as qey ("red") or t'eyem ("brown"), having lighter skin and more "Middle Eastern" facial features than those of the populations inside the continent. The Baryas were not allowed to join the congregation and were not allowed inside the synagogues and had to stay in the courtyard. Ownership passed down through the master's family for many generations. Intermarriage with them was prohibited, and a mixed descendant was considered a slave.

== Genetics ==
Several DNA studies have been done on the Beta Israel.

=== Paternal lineages ===
According to Cruciani et al. (2002), haplogroup A is the most common paternal lineage among Ethiopian Jews. The clade is carried by around 41% of Beta Israel males and are primarily associated with Nilo-Saharan and Khoisan-speaking populations. However, the A branches carried by Ethiopians Jews are principally of the A-Y23865 variety, which formed about 10,000 years ago and is localized to the Ethiopian highlands and the Arabian peninsula. The difference with some Khoisan is 54,000 years, and with others 125,000 years.

Around 18% of Ethiopian Jews are bearers of E-P2 (xM35, xM2); in Ethiopia, most of such lineages belong to E-M329, which has been found in ancient DNA isolated from a 4,500 year old Ethiopian fossil. Such haplotypes are frequent in Southwestern Ethiopia, especially among Omotic-speaking populations.

The rest of the Beta Israel mainly belong to haplotypes linked with the E-M35 and J-M267 haplogroups, which are more commonly associated with Ethiosemitic and Cushitic-speaking populations in Northeast Africa. Further analysis show that the E-M35 carried by Ethiopian Jews is primarily indigenous to the Horn of Africa rather than being of Levantine origin. Altogether, this suggests that Ethiopian Jews have diverse patrilineages indicative of indigenous Northeast African, not Middle Eastern, origin.

=== Maternal lineages ===
A 2011 mitochondrial DNA study focused on maternal haplogroups sampling 41 Beta Israel found them to carry 51.2% macro-haplogroup L typically found in Africa. The remainder consisted of Eurasian-origin lineages such as 22% R0, 19.5% M1, 5% W, and 2.5% U. However, no identical haplotypes were shared between the Yemenite and Ethiopian Jewish populations, suggesting very little gene flow between the populations and potentially distinct maternal population histories. The maternal ancestral profile of the Beta Israel is similar to those of highland Ethiopian populations, such as the Amhara.

=== Autosomal DNA ===
The Ethiopian Jews' autosomal DNA has been examined in a comprehensive study by Tishkoff et al. (2009) on the genetic affiliations of various populations in Africa. According to Bayesian clustering analysis, the Beta Israel generally grouped with other Ethiosemitic and Cushitic-speaking populations inhabiting the Horn of Africa.

A 2010 study by Behar et al. on the genome-wide structure of Jews observed that "Ethiopian Jews (Beta Israel) and Indian Jews (Bene Israel and Cochini) cluster with neighbouring autochthonous populations in Ethiopia and western India, respectively, despite a clear paternal link between the Bene Israel and the Levant. These results cast light on the variegated genetic architecture of the Middle East, and trace the origins of most Jewish Diaspora communities to the Levant." According to the study of Behar et al. Ethiopian Jews cluster closely to the Ethiosemitic-speaking Amharas and Tigrayans, and to a lesser degree to the Oromos.

The Beta Israel are autosomally closer to other populations from the Horn of Africa than to any other Jewish population. A 2011 mitochondrial DNA study found no indications of gene flow with Yemenite Jews, in spite of their geographic proximity. A 2012 study by Ostrer et al. concluded that the Ethiopian Jewish community was founded about 2,000 years ago, probably by only a relatively small number of Jews from elsewhere, with local people joining the community, causing Beta Israel to become genetically distant from other Jewish groups.

The history behind the ethnogenesis of the Beta Israel is a matter of dispute. They appear to have been lastingly isolated from broader Jewish communities, having historically practiced a divergent, non-Talmudic form of Judaism, known as Haymanot, that is similar in some respects to Karaite Judaism. Genetic studies show them to cluster closely with non-Jewish Amharas and Tigrayans, with no indications of maternal gene flow with Yemenite Jews in spite of their geographic proximity.

== Falash Mura ==
=== Terminology ===
The original term that the Beta Israel gave to the converts was "Faras Muqra" ("horse of the raven") in which the word "horse" refers to the converts and the word "raven" refers to the missionary Martin Flad who used to wear black clothes. This term derived the additional names Falas Muqra, Faras Mura and Falas Mura. In Hebrew the term "Falash Mura" (or "Falashmura") is probably a result of confusion over the use of the term "Faras Muqra" and its derivatives and on the basis of false cognate it was given the Hebrew meaning Falashim Mumarim ("converted Falashas").

The actual term "Falash Mura" has no clear origin. It is believed that the term may come from the Amharic and means "someone who changes their faith."

=== Conversion to Christianity ===
For years, Ethiopian Jews were unable to own land and were often persecuted by the Christian majority of Ethiopia. Ethiopian Jews were afraid to touch non-Jews because they believed non-Jews were not pure. They were also ostracized by their Christian neighbors. For this reason, many Ethiopian Jews converted to Christianity to seek a better life in Ethiopia. In 1860, Henry Aaron Stern, a Jewish convert to Christianity, traveled to Ethiopia in an attempt to convert the Beta Israel community to Christianity. The Jewish Agency's Ethiopia emissary, Asher Seyum, says the Falash Mura "converted in the 19th and 20th century, when Jewish relations with Christian rulers soured. Regardless, many kept ties with their Jewish brethren and were never fully accepted into the Christian communities. When word spread about the aliyah, many thousands of Falash Mura left their villages for Gondar and Addis Ababa, assuming they counted."

In the Achefer woreda of the Mirab Gojjam Zone, roughly 1,000–2,000 families of Beta Israel were found. There may be other such regions in Ethiopia with significant Jewish enclaves, which would raise the total population to more than 50,000 people.

=== Return to Judaism ===
The Falash Mura did not refer to themselves as members of the Beta Israel, the name for the Ethiopian Jewish community, until after the first wave of emigration to Israel. Beta Israel by ancestry, the Falash Mura believe they have just as much of a right to return to Israel as the Beta Israel themselves. Rabbi Ovadiah Yosef, a major player in the first wave of Beta Israel emigration to Israel, declared in 2002 that the Falash Mura had converted out of fear and persecution and therefore should be considered Jews.

=== Aliyah to Israel ===
Today, Falash Mura who move to Israel must undergo conversion on arrival, making it increasingly more difficult for them to get situated into Israeli society. The Beta Israel who immigrated and made Aliyah through Operation Moses and Operation Solomon were not required to undergo conversion because they were accepted as Jews under the Law of Return.

On February 16, 2003, the Israeli government applied Resolution 2958 to the Falash Mura, which grants maternal descendants of Beta Israel the right to immigrate to Israel under the Israeli Law of Return and to obtain citizenship if they convert to Judaism.

=== The Falash Mura's difficulties in immigrating to Israel ===
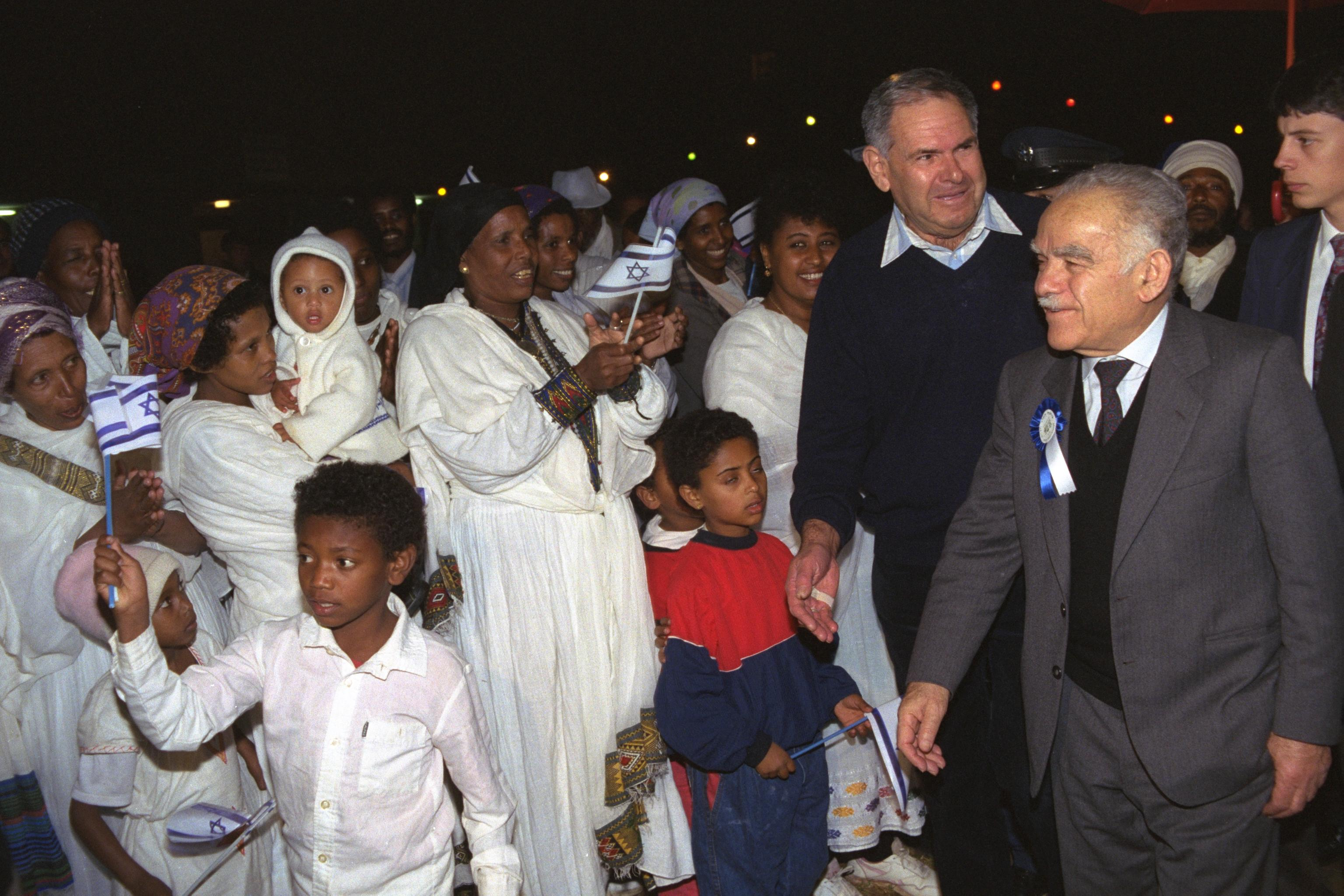
Israeli PM Yitzhak Shamir greets new immigrants from Ethiopia, 1991

In 1991, the Israeli authorities announced that the emigration of the Beta Israel to Israel was about to conclude, because almost all of the community had been evacuated. Nevertheless, thousands of other Ethiopians began leaving the northern region to take refuge in the government controlled capital, Addis Ababa, who were Jewish converts to Christianity and asking to immigrate to Israel. As a result, a new term arose which was used to refer to this group: "Falash Mura". The Falash Mura, who were not part of the Beta Israel communities in Ethiopia, were not recognized as Jews by the Israeli authorities, and were therefore not initially allowed to immigrate to Israel, making them ineligible for Israeli citizenship under Israel's Law of Return.

As a result, a lively debate has arisen in Israel about the Falash Mura, mainly between the Beta Israel community in Israel and their supporters and those opposed to a potential massive emigration of the Falash Mura people. The government's position on the matter remained quite restrictive, but it has been subject to numerous criticisms, including criticisms by some clerics who want to encourage these people's return to Judaism.

During the 1990s, the Israeli government finally allowed most of those who fled to Addis Ababa to immigrate to Israel. Some did so through the Law of Return, which allows an Israeli parent of a non-Jew to petition for his/her son or daughter to be allowed to immigrate to Israel. Others were allowed to immigrate to Israel as part of a humanitarian effort.

The Israeli government hoped that admitting these Falash Mura would finally bring emigration from Ethiopia to a close, but instead prompted a new wave of Falash Mura refugees fleeing to Addis Ababa and wishing to emigrate to Israel. This led the Israeli government to harden its position on the matter in the late 1990s.

In February 2003, the Israeli government decided to accept Orthodox religious conversions in Ethiopia of Falash Mura by Israeli Rabbis, after which they can then immigrate to Israel as Jews. Although the new position is more open, and although the Israeli governmental authorities and religious authorities should in theory allow immigration to Israel of most of the Falash Mura wishing to do so (who are now acknowledged to be descendants of the Beta Israel community), in practice, however, that immigration remains slow, and the Israeli government continued to limit, from 2003 to 2006, immigration of Falash Mura to about 300 per month.

In April 2005, The Jerusalem Post stated that it had conducted a survey in Ethiopia, after which it was concluded that tens of thousands of Falash Mura still lived in rural northern Ethiopia.

On 14 November 2010, the Israeli cabinet approved a plan to allow an additional 8,000 Falash Mura to immigrate to Israel.

On November 16, 2015, the Israeli cabinet unanimously voted in favor of allowing the last group of Falash Mura to immigrate over the next five years, but their acceptance will be conditional on a successful Jewish conversion process, according to the Interior Ministry. In April 2016, they announced that a total of 10,300 people would be included in the latest round of Aliyah, over the following 5 years. By May 2021 300 Falasha had been brought to Israel joining 1,700 who had already immigrated; an estimated 12,000 more are in Ethiopia.

=== Controversy ===
Today, both Israeli and Ethiopian groups dispute the Falash Mura's religious and political status. The Israeli government fears that these people are just using Judaism as an excuse to leave Ethiopia in efforts to improve their lives in a new country. Right-wing member of the Israeli Knesset Bezalel Smotrich was quoted saying, "This practice will develop into a demand to bring more and more family members not included in the Law of Return. It will open the door to an endless extension of a family chain from all over the world," he wrote, according to Kan. "How can the state explain in the High Court the distinction it makes between the Falashmura and the rest of the world?" Although the government has threatened to stop all efforts to bring these people to Israel, they have still continued to address the issue. In 2018, the Israeli government allowed 1,000 Falash Mura to immigrate to Israel. However, members of the Ethiopian community say the process for immigration approval is poorly executed and inaccurate, dividing families. At least 80 percent of the tribe members in Ethiopia say they have first-degree relatives living in Israel, and some have been waiting for 20 years to immigrate.

== Notable Beta Israelis ==
=== Pre-20th century ===
- Seble Wongel, Queen mother of the Abyssinian Empire
- Gudit, Queen of the Kingdom of Semien in the 10th–11th century
- Eldad ha-Dani, 9th-century Jewish traveler, and philologist widely believed to be of Ethiopian Jewish ancestry by scholars
- Uziel ben Melchiel, King of the Kingdom of Simien (during the time of Eldad ha-Dani; 9th century)
- Daniel ben Hanania, traveller who made the first extensive contact with the Ashkenazic Rabbinical court in Ottoman Palestine in 1855
- Abba Mehari, Zionist and Kahen who tried to make Aliyah on foot with the Ethiopian Jews in 1862

=== 20th century – present ===
==== Academia ====
- Ephraim Isaac, Professor at Harvard University and scholar

==== Arts and entertainment ====
- Eden Alene, representative for Israel in Eurovision Song Contest 2021
- Strong Black Coffee, hiphop group
- Yossi Vasa, Israeli actor and writer
- Hagit Yaso, winner of the ninth season of Kokhav Nolad

==== Fashion and modeling ====
- Yityish Titi Aynaw, Miss Israel (2013)
- Esti Mamo, model

==== Journalism ====
- Branu Tegene, Israeli journalist

==== Military and security ====
- Abraham Yitzhak, Lieutenant Colonel in the Israeli military and a director at Assuta Medical Center
- Ferede Aklum, Mossad agent

==== Politics ====
- Mazor Bahaina, politician for Shas and Orthodox rabbi
- Mazi Melesa Pilip, US Legislator, member of the Nassau County Legislature
- Shimon Solomon, politician
- Moshe Shlomo, Knesset member
- Pnina Tamano-Shata, Minister of Immigration and Absorption in thirty-sixth government of Israel
- Gadi Yevarkan, politician

==== Sports ====
- Eli Dasa, captain of the Israel national football team 2022–present
- Maru Teferi, Israeli Olympic marathoner
- Zohar Zimro, Israeli Olympic runner

==== Religion ====
- Uri Ben Baruch, religious leader and Liqa Kahnat (High Priest)
- Raphael Hadane, former Liqa Kahnat of the Beta Israel.
- Sharon Shalom, Israeli rabbi, lecturer and writer
- Reuven Wabashat - Ethiopian Chief Rabbi of Israel
- Menashe Zemro, former Liqa Kahnat of the Jews of Dembiya

== Affiliated groups ==
- Faras Muqra
- Maryam Wodet (The Lovers of Mary)
- Shamane
- Beta Abraham

== See also ==
- Ethiopia–Israel relations
- Groups claiming affiliation with Israelites
- History of Ethiopia
- History of the Jews in Africa
  - History of the Jews in Ethiopia
- Jewish diaspora
- Jewish ethnic divisions
- Jewish religious movements
  - Jewish schisms
- Jews of Bilad el-Sudan
- Jews of color
- Qemant people, a small subgroup of the Agaw people from Ethiopia, whose members traditionally practiced an early Hebraic religion
- Religion in Ethiopia
- Who is a Jew?
