= History of the Jews and Judaism in the Land of Israel =

The history of the Jews and Judaism in the Land of Israel begins with the Hebrew people (later known as the Israelites) in the 2nd millennium BCE. After emerging from among the Canaanites, the Twelve Tribes of Israel are said to have established the postulated "United Monarchy" that traditionally—but possibly ahistorically—marks the beginning of ancient Israel and Judah. According to Hebrew scripture, the United Monarchy split into two separate kingdoms occupying Canaan's highland zone: the Kingdom of Israel in the north and the Kingdom of Judah in the south. Israel was conquered by the Neo-Assyrian Empire around 722 BCE, resulting in the Ten Lost Tribes and the Assyrian captivity; while Judah was conquered by the Neo-Babylonian Empire around 587 BCE, resulting in the destruction of Solomon's Temple and the Babylonian captivity. By around 538 BCE, Babylon was conquered by the Achaemenid Empire of Cyrus the Great, who emancipated Judah's exiled population and facilitated their construction of the Second Temple inside the new Achaemenid province of Judah.

In 332 BCE the Kingdom of Macedonia under Alexander the Great conquered the Achaemenid Empire. This event started a long religious struggle that split the Jewish population into traditional and Hellenized components. After the religion-driven Maccabean Revolt, the independent Hasmonean Kingdom was established in 165 BCE. In 64 BCE, the Roman Republic conquered Judea, first subjugating it as a client state before ultimately converting it into a Roman province in 6 CE. Although coming under the sway of various empires and home to a variety of ethnicities, the area of ancient Israel was predominantly Jewish until the Jewish–Roman wars of 66–136 CE. The wars commenced a long period of violence, enslavement, expulsion, displacement, forced conversion, and forced migration against the local Jewish population by the Roman Empire (and successor Byzantine State), beginning the Jewish diaspora.

After this time, Jews became a minority in most regions, except Galilee. After the 3rd century, the area became increasingly Christianized, although the proportions of Christians and Jews are unknown, the former perhaps coming to predominate in urban areas, the latter remaining in rural areas. By the time of the Muslim conquest of the Levant, the number of Jewish population centers had declined from over 160 to around 50 settlements. Michael Avi-Yonah says that Jews constituted 10–15% of Palestine's population by the time of the Sasanian conquest of Jerusalem in 614, while Moshe Gil says that Jews constituted the majority of the population until the 7th century Muslim conquest in 638 CE. Remaining Jews in Palestine fought alongside Muslims during the Crusades, and were persecuted under the Kingdom of Jerusalem.

In 1517, the Ottoman Empire conquered the region, ruling it until the British conquered it in 1917. The region was ruled under the British Mandate for Palestine until 1948, when the Jewish State of Israel was proclaimed in part of the land. This was made possible by the Zionist movement and its promotion of mass Jewish immigration.

After the establishment of Israel, immigration of Holocaust survivors from Europe and a large influx of Jewish immigrants and refugees from Arab countries had doubled Israel's population within five years of its independence. Israel's Jewish population continued to grow at a very high rate for years, fed by waves of Jewish immigration from around the world.

== Etymology ==
The term "Jews" originates from the Biblical Hebrew word Yehudi, and in its original meaning refers to the people of the Tribe of Judah or the people of the Kingdom of Judah. The name of both the tribe and kingdom derive from Judah, the fourth son of Jacob. Originally, the Hebrew term Yehudi referred only to members of the tribe of Judah. Later, after the destruction of the Kingdom of Israel (Samaria), the term "Yehudi" was applied to anyone from the Kingdom of Judah, including the tribes of Judah, Benjamin and Levi, as well as scattered settlements from other tribes.

The Land of Israel, which is considered by Jews to be the Promised Land, was the place where Jewish identity was formed, although this identity was formed gradually, reaching much of its current form in the Exilic and post-Exilic period. By the Hellenistic period (after 332 BCE) the Jews had become a self-consciously separate community based in Jerusalem.

== Ancient times ==
=== Early Israelites ===
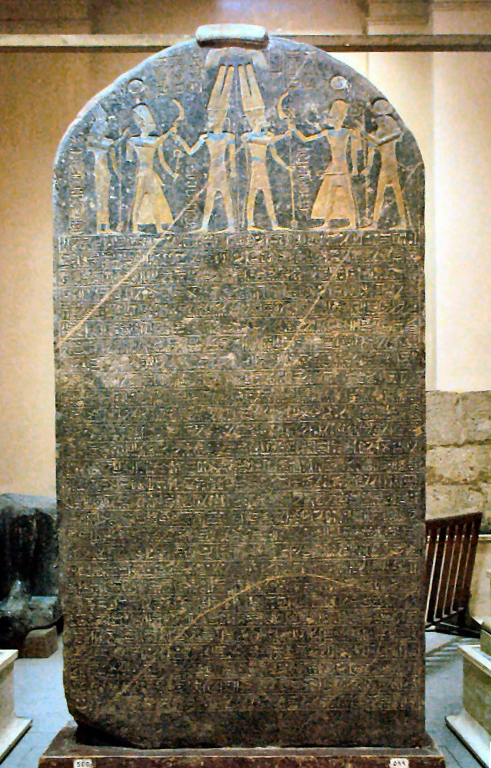
The Merneptah Stele. While alternative translations exist, the majority of biblical archeologists translate a set of hieroglyphs as "Israel", representing the first instance of the name Israel in the historical record.

The Israelites were a confederation of Iron Age Semitic-speaking tribes of the ancient Near East, who inhabited a part of Canaan during the tribal and monarchic periods. According to the religious narrative of the Hebrew Bible, the Israelites' origin is traced back to the biblical patriarchs and matriarchs Abraham and his wife Sarah, through their son Isaac and his wife Rebecca, and their son Jacob who was later called Israel, whence they derive their name, with his wives Leah and Rachel and the handmaids Zilpa and Bilhah.

Modern archaeology has largely discarded the historicity of the religious narrative, with its being reframed as constituting an inspiring national myth narrative. The Israelites and their culture, according to the modern archaeological account, did not overtake the region by force, but instead branched out of the indigenous Canaanite peoples that had long inhabited the Levant through the development of a distinct monolatristic—later cementing as monotheistic—religion centered on Yahweh, one of the Ancient Canaanite deities. The outgrowth of a Yahweh-centric belief, along with a number of cultic practices, gradually gave rise to a distinct Israelite ethnic group, setting them apart from other Canaanites.

The name Israel first appears in the stele of the Egyptian pharaoh Merneptah c. 1209 BC, "Israel is laid waste and his seed is not." This "Israel" was a cultural and probably political entity of the central highlands, well enough established to be perceived by the Egyptians as a possible challenge to their hegemony, but an ethnic group rather than an organized state. Ancestors of the Israelites may have included Semites who occupied Canaan and the Sea Peoples. According to modern archaeologists, sometime during Iron Age I a population began to identify itself as 'Israelite', differentiating itself from the Canaanites through such markers as the prohibition of intermarriage, an emphasis on family history and genealogy, and religion. Archaeological evidence indicates the emergence of a new culture in the highlands of central Canaan during Iron Age I. The area, which had been previously sparsely populated, saw a series of new villages established within a span of a few generations, and the inhabitants seem to have been culturally distinct from the Canaanites and Philistines. This is believed to be the origin of the Israelites as a distinct nation.

Extensive archaeological excavations have provided a picture of Israelite society during the early Iron Age period. The archaeological evidence indicates a society of village-like centres, but with more limited resources and a small population. During this period, Israelites lived primarily in small villages, the largest of which had populations of up to 300 or 400. Their villages were built on hilltops. Their houses were built in clusters around a common courtyard. They built three or four-room houses out of mudbrick with a stone foundation and sometimes with a second story made of wood. The inhabitants lived by farming and herding. They built terraces to farm on hillsides, planting various crops and maintaining orchards. The villages were largely economically self-sufficient and economic interchange was prevalent. According to the Bible, prior to the rise of the Israelite monarchy the early Israelites were led by the Biblical judges, or chieftains who served as military leaders in times of crisis. Scholars are divided over the historicity of this account. However, it is likely that regional chiefdoms and polities provided security. The small villages were unwalled but were likely subjects of the major town in the area. Writing was known and available for recording, even at small sites.

=== Israel and Judah ===
The Iron Age kingdom of Israel (blue) and kingdom of Judah (tan), with their neighbours (8th century BCE), based on Biblical accounts

The archaeological record indicates that the culture that later evolved into the Kingdoms of Israel and Judah emerged in the Early Iron Age (Iron Age I, 1200–1000 BCE) from the Canaanite city-state culture of the Late Bronze Age, at the same time and in the same circumstances as the neighbouring states of Edom, Moab, Aram, and the Philistinian and Phoenician city-states. The oldest Hebrew text ever found was discovered at the ancient Israelite settlement, Elah Fortress, which dates to between 1050 and 970 BCE.

Biblical narrative and moderate academic consensus states that a United Kingdom of Israel existed in the 10th and 9th centuries BCE. Its postulated third king - David - established a dynasty whose descendants ruled over the remainder of the United Monarchy, and continued to rule over the Kingdom of Judah until its eventual destruction at the hands of the Neo-Babylonian Empire in 586 BCE. David's son and successor Solomon built a Temple in Jerusalem, which became the centerpiece of collective Israelite (and later Jewish) religious worship until its destruction. Possible references to the House of David have been found at two sites, the Tel Dan Stele and the Mesha Stele. Yigael Yadin's excavations at Hazor, Megiddo, Beit Shean and Gezer uncovered structures that he and others have argued date from Solomon's reign, but others, such as Israel Finkelstein and Neil Silberman (who agree that Solomon was a historical king), argue that they should be dated to the Omride period, more than a century after Solomon.

By around 930 BCE, the Israelite population had separated into a southern Kingdom of Judah and a northern Kingdom of Israel. By the middle of the 9th century BCE, it is possible that an alliance between Ahab of Israel and Ben Hadad II of Damascus managed to repulse the incursions of the Assyrian king Shalmaneser III, with a victory at the Battle of Qarqar (854 BCE). The Tel Dan stele tells of the death of a king of Israel, probably Jehoram, at the hands of an Aramean king (c. 841).

Archaeological records indicate that the Kingdom of Israel was fairly prosperous. The late Iron Age saw an increase in urban development in Israel. Whereas previously the Israelites had lived mainly in small and unfortified settlements, the rise of the Kingdom of Israel saw the growth of cities and the construction of palaces, large royal enclosures, and fortifications with walls and gates. Israel initially had to invest significant resources into defense as it was subjected to regular Aramean incursions and attacks, but after the Arameans were subjugated by the Assyrians and Israel could afford to put less resources into defending its territory, its architectural infrastructure grew dramatically. Extensive fortifications were built around cities such as Dan, Megiddo, and Hazor, including monumental and multi-towered city walls and multi-gate entry systems. Israel's economy was based on multiple industries. It had the largest olive oil production centers in the region, using at least two different types of olive oil presses, and also had a significant wine industry, with wine presses constructed next to vineyards. By contrast, the Kingdom of Judah was significantly less advanced. Some scholars believe it was no more than a small tribal entity limited to Jerusalem and its immediate surroundings. In the 10th and early 9th centuries BCE, the territory of Judah appears to have been sparsely populated, limited to small and mostly unfortified settlements. The status of Jerusalem in the 10th century BCE is a major subject of debate among scholars. Jerusalem does not show evidence of significant Israelite residential activity until the 9th century BCE. On the other hand, significant administrative structures such as the Stepped Stone Structure and Large Stone Structure, which originally formed part of one structure, contain material culture from earlier than that. The ruins of a significant Judahite military fortress, Tel Arad, have also been found in the Negev, and a collection of military orders found there suggest literacy was present throughout the ranks of the Judahite army. This suggests that literacy was not limited to a tiny priestly caste, indicating the presence of a substantial educational infrastructure in Judah.

From the middle of the 8th century BCE Israel came into increasing conflict with the expanding Neo-Assyrian Empire. Under Tiglath-Pileser III it first split Israel's territory into several smaller units and then destroyed its capital, Samaria (722 BCE). Both the biblical and Assyrian sources speak of a massive deportation of the people of Israel and their replacement with an equally large number of forced settlers from other parts of the empire – such population exchanges were an established part of Assyrian imperial policy, a means of breaking the old power structure – and the former Israel never again became an independent political entity. This deportation gave rise to the notion of the Lost Tribes of Israel. The Samaritan people claim to be descended from survivors of the Assyrian conquest.

The recovered seal of the Ahaz, king of Judah, (c. 732–716 BCE) identifies him as King of Judah. The Assyrian king Sennacherib, tried and failed to conquer Judah. Assyrian records say he leveled 46 walled cities and besieged Jerusalem, leaving after receiving tribute. During the reign of Hezekiah (c. 716–687 BCE) a notable increase in the power of the Judean state is reflected by archaeological sites and findings such as the Broad Wall and the Siloam tunnel in Jerusalem.

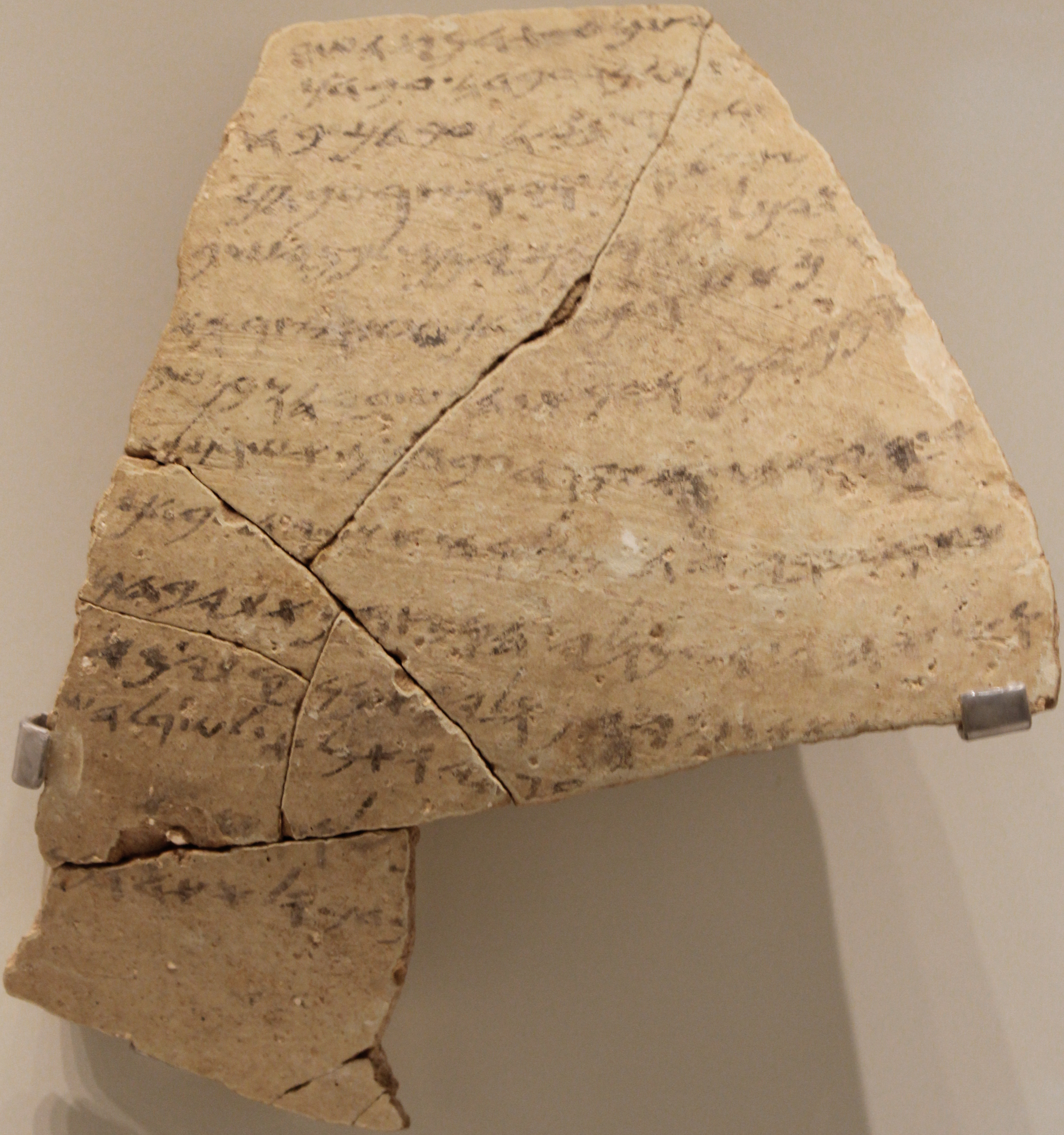
The Yavne-Yam ostracon, a Paleo-Hebrew inscription documenting administration in Judah

Judah prospered in the 7th century BCE, probably in a cooperative arrangement with the Assyrians to establish Judah as an Assyrian vassal (despite a disastrous rebellion against the Assyrian king Sennacherib). However, in the last half of the 7th century Assyria suddenly collapsed, and the ensuing competition between the Egyptian Empire and Neo-Babylonian Empire for control of Palestine led to the destruction of Judah in a series of campaigns between 597 and 582.

According to Professor Meir Bar-Ilan, on the eve of the end of the First Temple period and the Persian conquest, the population of the land was approximately 350,000, of whom 150,000 lived in Judea and 200,000 in the Galilee and Transjordan.

=== Exile under Babylon (586–538 BCE) ===
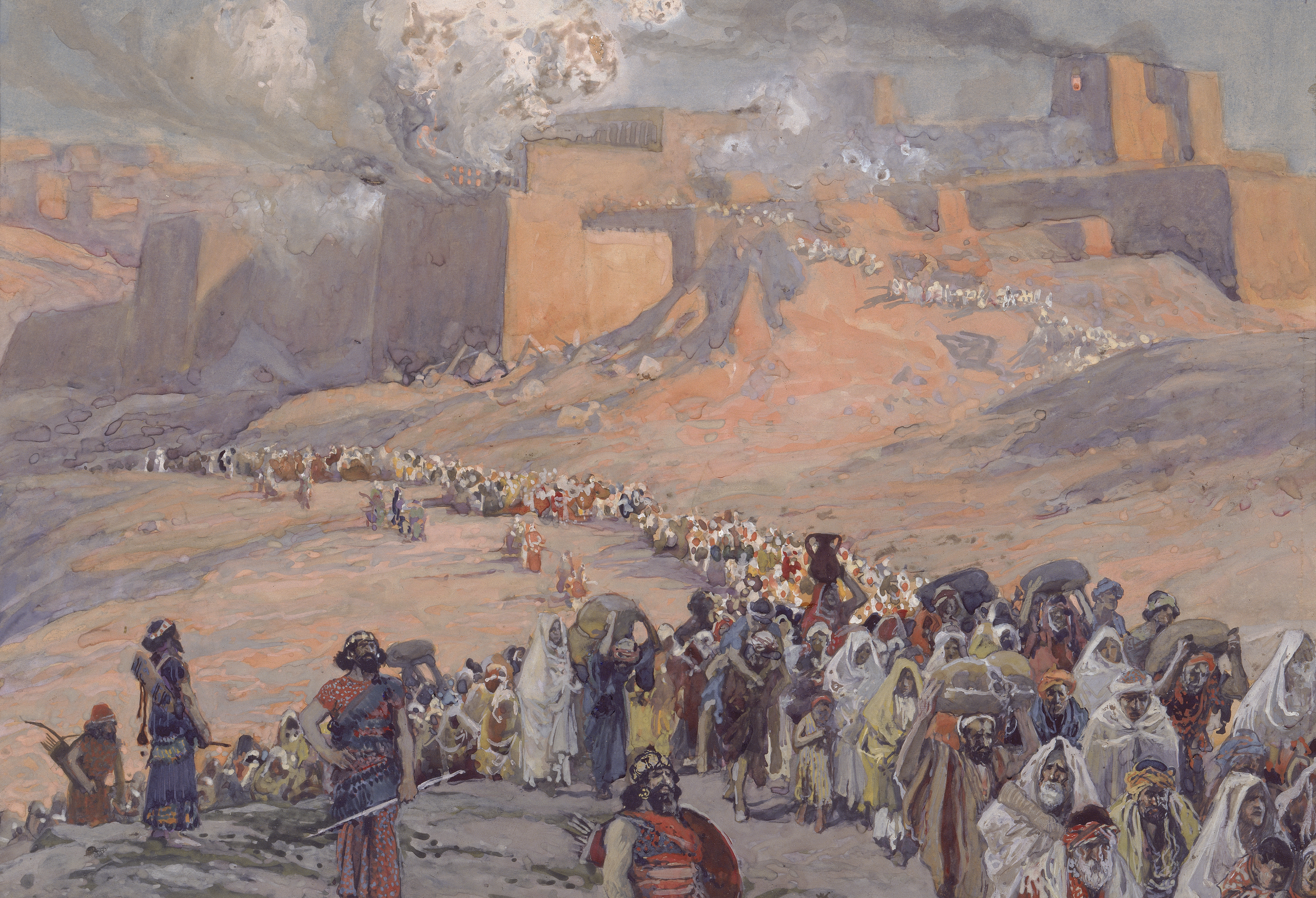
An artist's depiction of the deportation and exile of the Jews of the ancient Kingdom of Judah to Babylon and the destruction of Jerusalem and Solomon's Temple

The Assyrian Empire was overthrown in 612 BCE by the Medes and the Neo-Babylonian Empire. In 586 BCE King Nebuchadnezzar II of Babylon conquered Judah. According to the Hebrew Bible, he destroyed Solomon's Temple and exiled the Judean elites to Babylon. The defeat was also recorded by the Babylonians in the Babylonian Chronicles. The exile of Judean elites may have been restricted to the priests and ruling class.

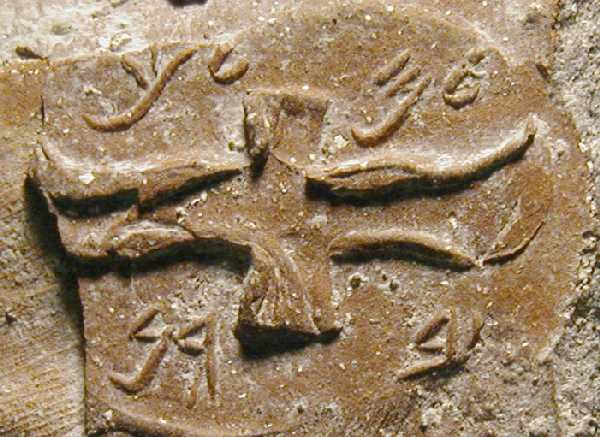
One of the 21 LMLK seals found near the ancient city of Lachish, which has an inscription written in Paleo-Hebrew alphabet and is dated from the reign of Hezekiah

Babylonian Judah suffered a steep decline in both economy and population and lost the Negev, the Shephelah, and part of the Judean hill country, including Hebron, to encroachments from Edom and other neighbours. Jerusalem, while probably not totally abandoned, was much smaller than previously, and the town of Mizpah in Benjamin in the relatively unscathed northern section of the kingdom became the capital of the new Babylonian province of Yehud Medinata. (This was standard Babylonian practice: when the Philistine city of Ashkalon was conquered in 604, the political, religious and economic ruling class (but not the bulk of the population) was banished and the administrative centre shifted to a new location). There is also a strong probability that for most or all of the period the temple at Bethel in Benjamin replaced that at Jerusalem, boosting the prestige of Bethel's priests (the Aaronites) against those of Jerusalem (the Zadokites), now in exile in Babylon.

The Babylonian conquest entailed not just the destruction of Jerusalem and its First Temple, but the ruination of the entire infrastructure which had sustained Judah for centuries. The most significant casualty was the state ideology of "Zion theology," the idea that Yahweh, the god of Israel, had chosen Jerusalem for his dwelling-place and that the Davidic dynasty would reign there forever. The fall of the city and the end of Davidic kingship forced the leaders of the exile community – kings, priests, scribes and prophets – to reformulate the concepts of community, faith and politics.

The exile community in Babylon thus became the source of significant portions of the Hebrew Bible: Isaiah 40–55, Ezekiel, the final version of Jeremiah, the work of the Priestly source in the Pentateuch, and the final form of the history of Israel from Deuteronomy to 2 Kings. Theologically, they were responsible for the doctrines of individual responsibility and universalism (the concept that one god controls the entire world), and for the increased emphasis on purity and holiness. Most significantly, the trauma of the exile experience led to the development of a strong sense of identity as a people distinct from other peoples, and increased emphasis on symbols such as circumcision and Sabbath-observance to maintain that separation.

== Second Temple period (538 BCE – 70 CE) ==
=== Persian rule (538–332 BCE) ===
In 538 BCE, Cyrus the Great of the Achaemenid Empire conquered Babylon and took over its empire. Yehud remained a province of the Achaemenid empire until 332 BCE. According to the Bible, Cyrus issued a proclamation granting subjugated nations their freedom, and 50,000 Judeans, led by Zerubabel, returned to Judah to rebuild the Temple of Jerusalem. The Second Temple was subsequently built in Jerusalem, and is said to have been completed c. 515. A second group of 5,000, led by Ezra and Nehemiah, returned to Judah in 456 BCE. Yet it was probably only in the middle of the next century, at the earliest, that Jerusalem again became the capital of Judah. The completion of the Temple ushered in the Second Temple period of Jewish history, which was to last approximately 600 years until the Temple's destruction by the Romans in 70 CE. This era saw a dramatic increase in the population of the land over the centuries. Archaeological evidence testifies to the increase of the population, with evidence that existing cities were expanded and many new cities were founded. The construction of new aqueducts and the introduction of new crops also increased the productivity of the land.

The Persians may have experimented initially with ruling Judah as a Davidic client-kingdom under descendants of Jehoiachin, but by the mid–5th century BCE Judah had become in practice a theocracy, ruled by hereditary High Priests and a Persian-appointed governor, frequently Jewish, charged with keeping order and seeing that tribute was paid. According to the Bible, Ezra and Nehemiah arrived in Jerusalem in the middle of the 5th century BCE, the first empowered by the Persian king to enforce the Torah, the second with the status of governor and a royal mission to restore the walls of the city. The Bible mentions tension between the returnees and those who had remained in Judah, the former rebuffing the attempt of the "peoples of the land" to participate in the rebuilding of the Temple; this attitude was based partly on the exclusivism which the exiles had developed while in Babylon and, probably, partly on disputes over property. The careers of Ezra and Nehemiah in the 5th century BCE were thus a kind of religious colonisation in reverse, an attempt by one of the many Jewish factions in Babylon to create a self-segregated, ritually pure society inspired by the prophesies of Ezekiel and his followers.

=== Hellenistic and Hasmonean era (332–64 BCE) ===
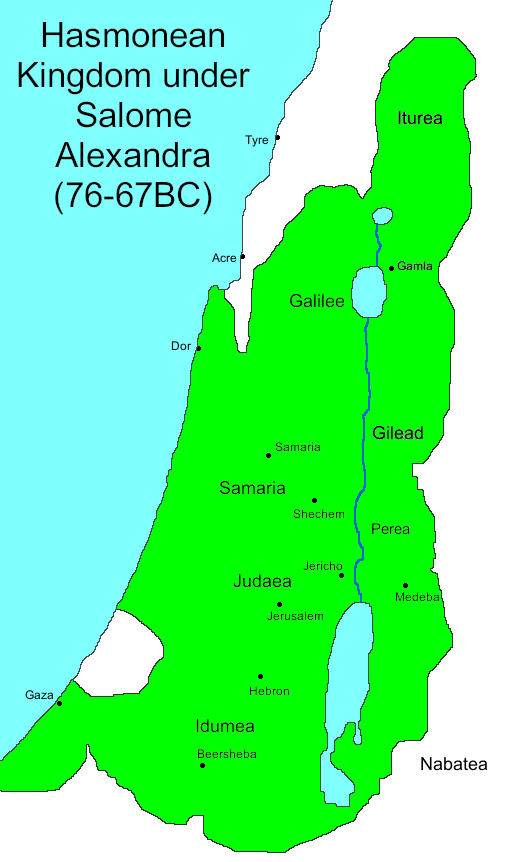
The Hasmonean kingdom at its greatest extent.

In 332 BCE the Achaemenid Empire was defeated by Alexander the Great. After his death in 322 BCE, his generals divided the empire between them and Judea became the frontier between the Seleucid Empire and Ptolemaic Egypt, but in 198 Judea was incorporated into the Seleucid Empire.

At first, relations between the Seleucids and the Jews were cordial, but later on as the relations between the hellenized Jews and the religious Jews deteriorated, the Seleucid king Antiochus IV Epiphanes (174–163) attempted to impose decrees banning certain Jewish religious rites and traditions. Consequently, this sparked a national rebellion led by Judas Maccabeus. The Maccabean Revolt (174–135 BCE), whose victory is celebrated in the Jewish festival of Hanukkah, is told in the deuterocanonical Books of the Maccabees. A Jewish group called the Hasideans opposed both Seleucid Hellenism and the revolt, but eventually gave their support to the Maccabees. The Jews prevailed with the expulsion of the Seleucids and the establishment of an independent Jewish kingdom under the Hasmonean dynasty.

The Maccabean Revolt led to a twenty-five-year period of Jewish independence due to the steady collapse of the Seleucid Empire under attacks from the rising powers of the Roman Republic and the Parthian Empire. The Hasmonean dynasty of priest-kings ruled Judea with the Pharisees, Saducees and Essenes as the principal social movements. As part of their struggle against Hellenistic civilization, the Pharisees established what may have been the world's first national male (religious) education and literacy program, based around synagogues. Justice was administered by the Sanhedrin, whose leader was known as the Nasi. The Nasi's religious authority gradually superseded that of the Temple's high priest (under the Hasmoneans this was the king). In 125 BCE the Hasmonean King John Hyrcanus subjugated Edom and forcibly converted the population to Judaism.

The same power vacuum that enabled the Jewish state to be recognized by the Roman Senate c. 139 BCE after the demise of the Seleucid Empire was next exploited by the Romans themselves. Hyrcanus II and Aristobulus II, Simon's great-grandsons, became pawns in a proxy war between Julius Caesar and Pompey the Great that ended with the kingdom under the supervision of the Roman governor of Syria (64 BCE).

=== Early Roman period (64 BCE – 70 CE) ===
1st-century BCE – 2nd-century CE

64 BCE
Rome conquers Judea and
Jerusalem
40–37
Antigonus the Hasmonean
rules as King of Judea
37
Herod the Great made ruler
of Judea
19
Herod's Temple completed
4 BCE
Tetrarchy of Judea formed
6 CE
Iudaea province formed
20
Tiberias founded
66–73
First Jewish–Roman War

67
Gamla and Jotapata fall
70
Second Temple destroyed,
Council of Jamnia founded
73
Masada falls

115–117
Kitos War
130
Temple of Jupiter built upon
Temple Mount
132
Judea merged into Syria Palaestina
132–136
Bar-Kochba revolt, Ten Martyrs
executed
c. 200
Mishnah completed

In 63 BCE the Roman general Pompey sacked Jerusalem and made the Jewish kingdom a client of Rome. The situation was not to last, as the deaths of Pompey in 48 BCE and Caesar in 44 BCE, together with the related Roman civil wars, relaxed Rome's grip on Judea. This resulted in the Parthian Empire and their Jewish ally Antigonus the Hasmonean defeating the pro-Roman Jewish forces (high priest Hyrcanus II, Phasael and Herod the Great) in 40 BCE. They invaded the Roman eastern provinces and managed to expel the Romans. Antigonus was made King of Judea. Herod fled to Rome, where he was elected "King of the Jews" by the Roman Senate and was given the task of retaking Judea. In 37 BCE, with Roman support, Herod reclaimed Judea, and the short-lived reemergence of the Hasmonean dynasty came to an end. From 37 BCE to 6 CE, the Herodian dynasty, Jewish-Roman client kings, ruled Judea. In 20 BCE, Herod began a refurbishment and expansion of the Second Temple in Jerusalem. His son, Herod Antipas, founded the Jewish city of Tiberias in the Galilee.

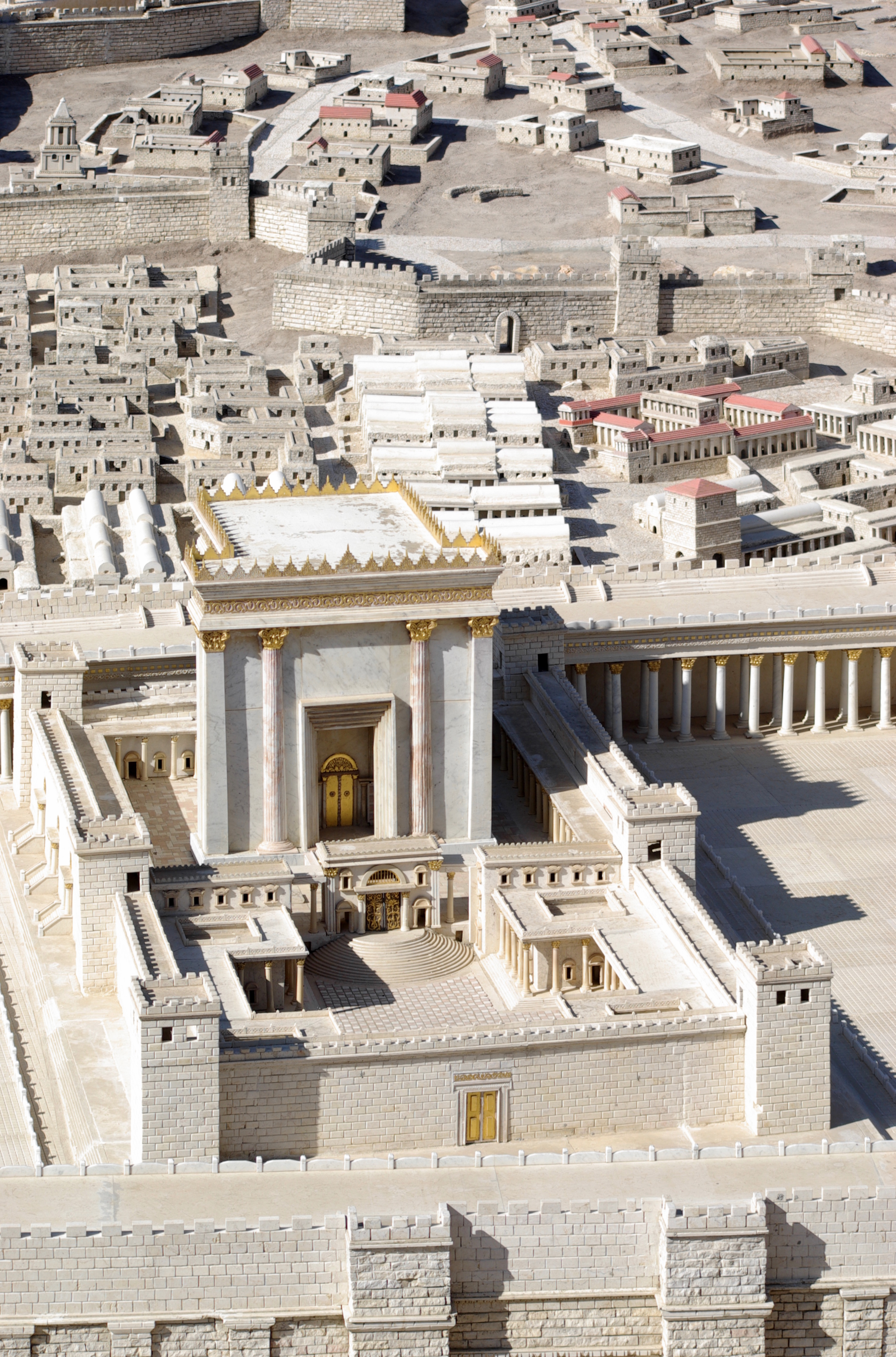
Model of Herod's Temple, (Israel Museum)

Judea under Roman rule was at first a client kingdom, but gradually the rule over Judea became less and less Jewish, until it became under the direct rule of Roman administration from Caesarea Maritima, which was often callous and brutal in its treatment of its Judean, Galilean, and Samaritan subjects. In this period Rabbinical Judaism, led by Hillel the Elder, began to assume popular prominence over the Temple priesthood.

Throughout this period, the Jewish population continued to increase. The final two centuries before the destruction of the Second Temple saw a massive wave of urbanization; as the villages and towns reached capacity, many people migrated to urban areas. More than 30 towns and cities of different sizes were founded, rebuilt, or enlarged in a relatively short period. A third wall was erected around Jerusalem to encompass the thousands of people living outside the old walls. Though this was not limited to the Jewish population, with the new towns not being Jewish-only and some having no Jews, this points to a high level of growth among the Jewish population. The Jewish population of the land on the eve of the first major Jewish rebellion may have been as high as 2.2 million. The monumental architecture of this period indicates a high level of prosperity.

In 66 CE, the Jews of Judea rose in revolt against Rome, sparking the First Jewish–Roman War. The rebels seized control of Judea and named their new kingdom "Israel" (see also First Jewish Revolt coinage). The events were described by the Jewish historian Josephus, including the desperate defence of Jotapata, the siege of Jerusalem (69–70 CE), the heroic last stand at Gamla, where 9,000 died, and the siege of Masada (72–73 CE) where the Sicarii killed themselves rather than fall into the hand of their Roman enemy.

The revolt was crushed by the Roman emperors Vespasian and Titus. The Romans destroyed much of the Temple in Jerusalem and took as punitive tribute the Menorah and other Temple artefacts back to Rome. Josephus writes that 1,100,000 Jews perished during the revolt, while a further 97,000 were taken captive. The Fiscus Judaicus was instituted by the Empire as part of reparations.

It was during this period that the split of early Christianity and Judaism occurred. The Pharisee movement, led by Yochanan ben Zakai, made peace with Rome and survived. Judeans continued to live in their land in large numbers, and were allowed to practice their religion. An estimated 2/3 of the population in the Galilee and 1/3 of the coastal region were Jewish.

== Rabbinic period (70–636 CE) ==
=== Late Roman period (70–324) ===
The 2nd century saw two further Jewish revolts against the Roman rule. The Kitos War (115–117) saw Jewish diaspora communities in North Africa, Cyprus, and Mesopotamia rise against Rome. After being defeated, the rebels fled to Judea, where they gathered at Lydda. The Romans pursued them, capturing Lydda and executing many of the rebel Jews. In the aftermath of the war, Jewish diaspora communities involved in the revolt were expelled to the eastern edges of the Roman Empire, and mainly settled in Judea. This was followed by the more fierce Bar Kochba revolt (132–136) led by Simon Bar Kokhba. The Jewish rebels again regained temporary independence in Judea. An independent Jewish state existed in Judea for over two years. However, Julius Severus and Emperor Hadrian ultimately crushed the rebellion, and Judea was ravaged. According to Cassius Dio, 580,000 Jews were killed, and 50 fortified towns and 985 villages were razed.

The Roman suppression of the two major revolts in Judea led to the growth of the Jewish diaspora at the expense of Judea's population. Many Jews taken captive by the Romans were deported from Judea and sold into slavery. Josephus wrote that 97,000 Jews were sold into slavery following the First Jewish–Roman War and 30,000 were deported from Judea to Carthage. Many Jews also fled Judea to other areas in the Mediterranean region. Jews were again deported from Judea and sold into slavery after the Bar Kokhba revolt. Jews taken as slaves by the Romans and their children were eventually manumitted and joined established Jewish diaspora communities. Many other Jews migrated voluntarily from Judea in the aftermath of the Bar Kokhba revolt.

In 131, Emperor Hadrian renamed Jerusalem Aelia Capitolina and constructed the Temple of Jupiter Optimus Maximus on the site of the former Jewish temple. Jews were banned from Jerusalem and Roman Judaea was renamed Syria Palaestina, from which is derived "Palestine" in English and "Filistin" in Arabic.

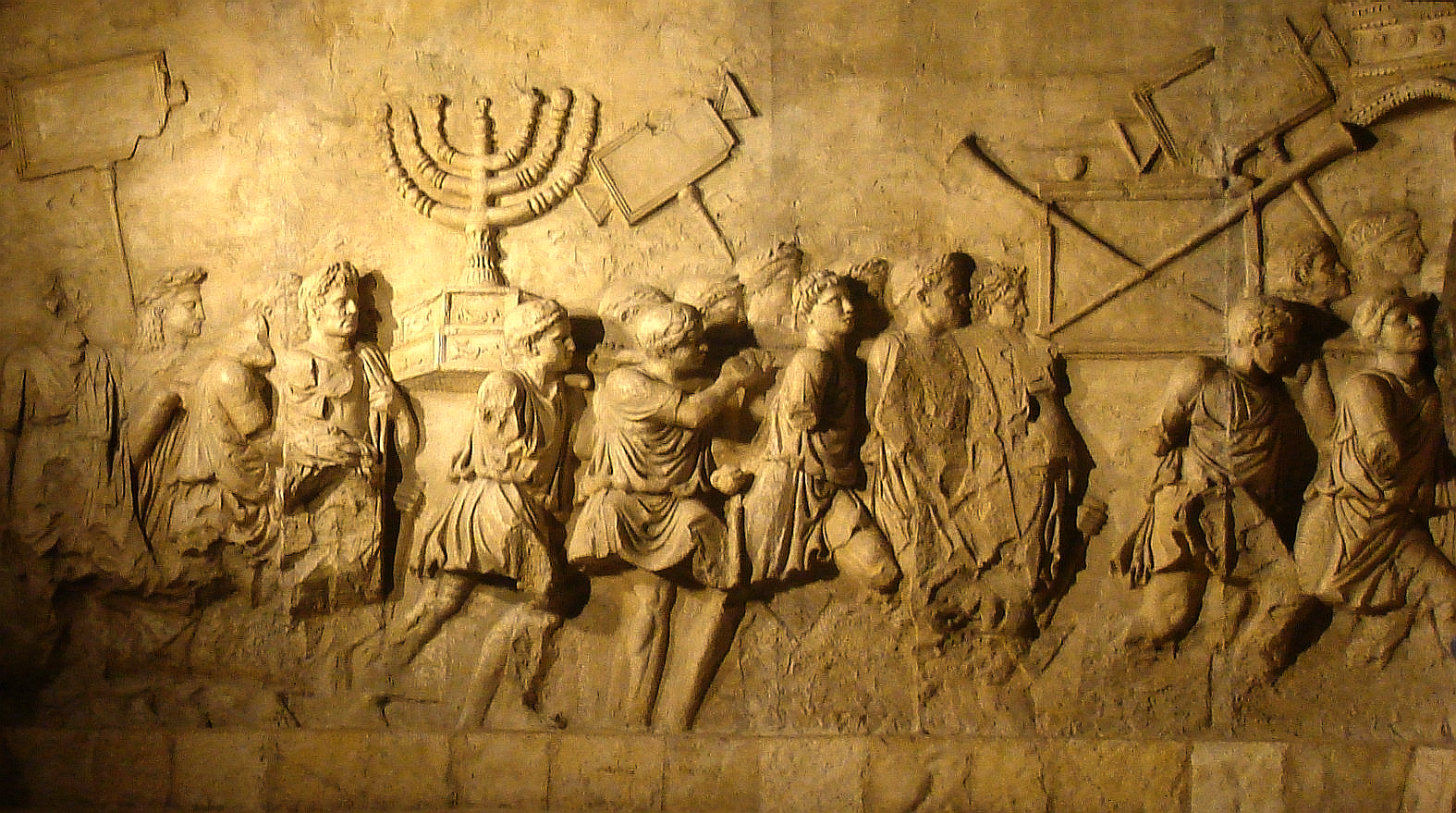
The sack of Jerusalem depicted on the Arch of Titus, Rome

After suppressing the Bar Kochba revolt, the Romans permitted a hereditary rabbinical patriarch from the House of Hillel to represent the Jews in dealings with the Romans. The most famous of these was Judah the Prince. Jewish seminaries continued to produce scholars, of whom the most astute became members of the Sanhedrin. The main Jewish population center was now the Galilee, and there were also significant Jewish communities in Beit She'an, Caesarea, the Golan Heights, and along the edges of Judea. In this era, according to a popular theory, the Council of Jamnia developed the Jewish Bible canon which decided which books of the Hebrew Bible were to be included, the Jewish apocrypha being left out. It was also the time when the tannaim and amoraim were active in debating and recording the Jewish Oral Law. Their discussions and religious instructions were compiled in the form of the Mishnah by Judah the Prince around 200 CE. Various other compilations, including the Beraita and Tosefta, also come from this period. These texts were the foundation of the Jerusalem Talmud, which was redacted in around 400 CE, probably in Tiberias.

During the Crisis of the Third Century, economic disruption and high taxation due to civil wars in the Roman Empire caused many Jews to migrate from the Land of Israel to Babylon under the more tolerant Persian Sassanid Empire, where an autonomous Jewish community existed in the area of Babylon. They were lured by the promise of economic prosperity and the ability to lead a full Jewish life there. During this time, the Land of Israel and Babylon were both great centers of Jewish scholarship. However, sages in the Land of Israel came to fear that the centrality of the land to Judaism would be lost. Many refused to consider Babylonian scholars their equals and would not ordain Babylonian students in their academies, fearing they would return to Babylon as rabbis. The large scale of Jewish emigration to Babylon adversely affected the academies of the Land of Israel, and by the end of the 3rd century they were increasingly reliant on donations from Babylon.

There was a notable rivalry between Palestinian and Babylonian academies. The former thought that leaving the land in peaceful times was tantamount to idolatry and many would not ordain Babylonian students for fear they would then return to their Babylonian homeland, while Babylonian scholars thought that Palestinian rabbis were descendants of the 'inferior stock' putatively returning with Ezra after the Babylonian exile.

=== Byzantine period (324–638) ===
Byzantine period

351–352
Jewish revolt against Gallus,
Jewish communities and academies
in disarray
358
Hillel II institutes Hebrew calendar
361–363
Rebuilding of Temple attempted
under Julian
425
Gamliel VI, last Prince of the
Sanhedrin, dies
429
Jewish Patriarchate abolished by
Theodosius II
438
Eudocia allows Jewish prayer
on Temple Mount
450
Redaction of Jerusalem Talmud
614–617
Jews gain autonomy in Jerusalem
under Persian rule
625
Liturgical poet Yannai flourishes

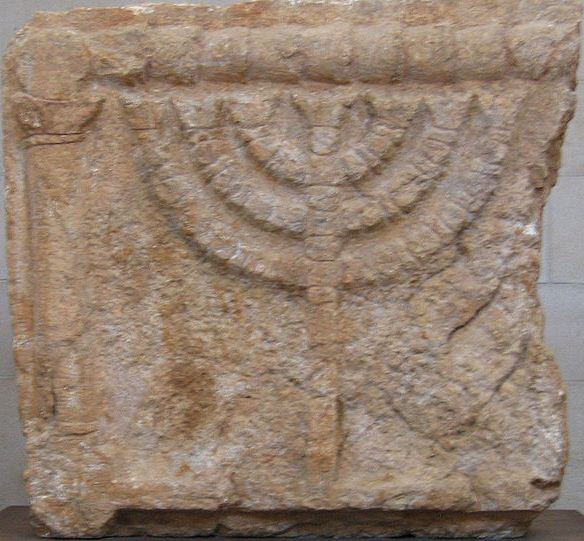
Eshtemoa synagogue menorah, carved during the 3rd or 4th century.

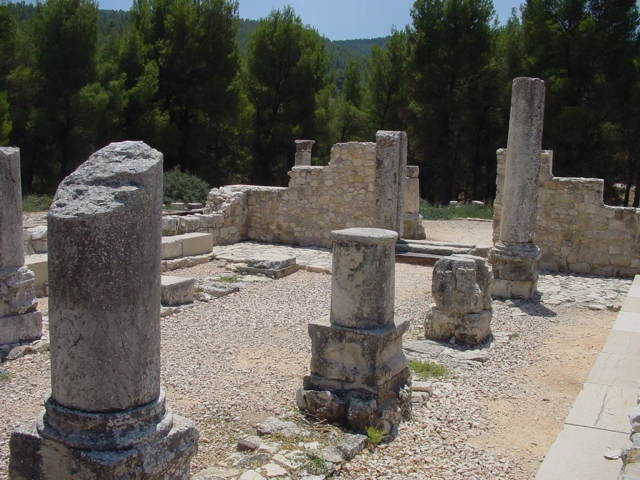
The ancient synagogue at Nabratein was destroyed in the Galilee earthquake of 363

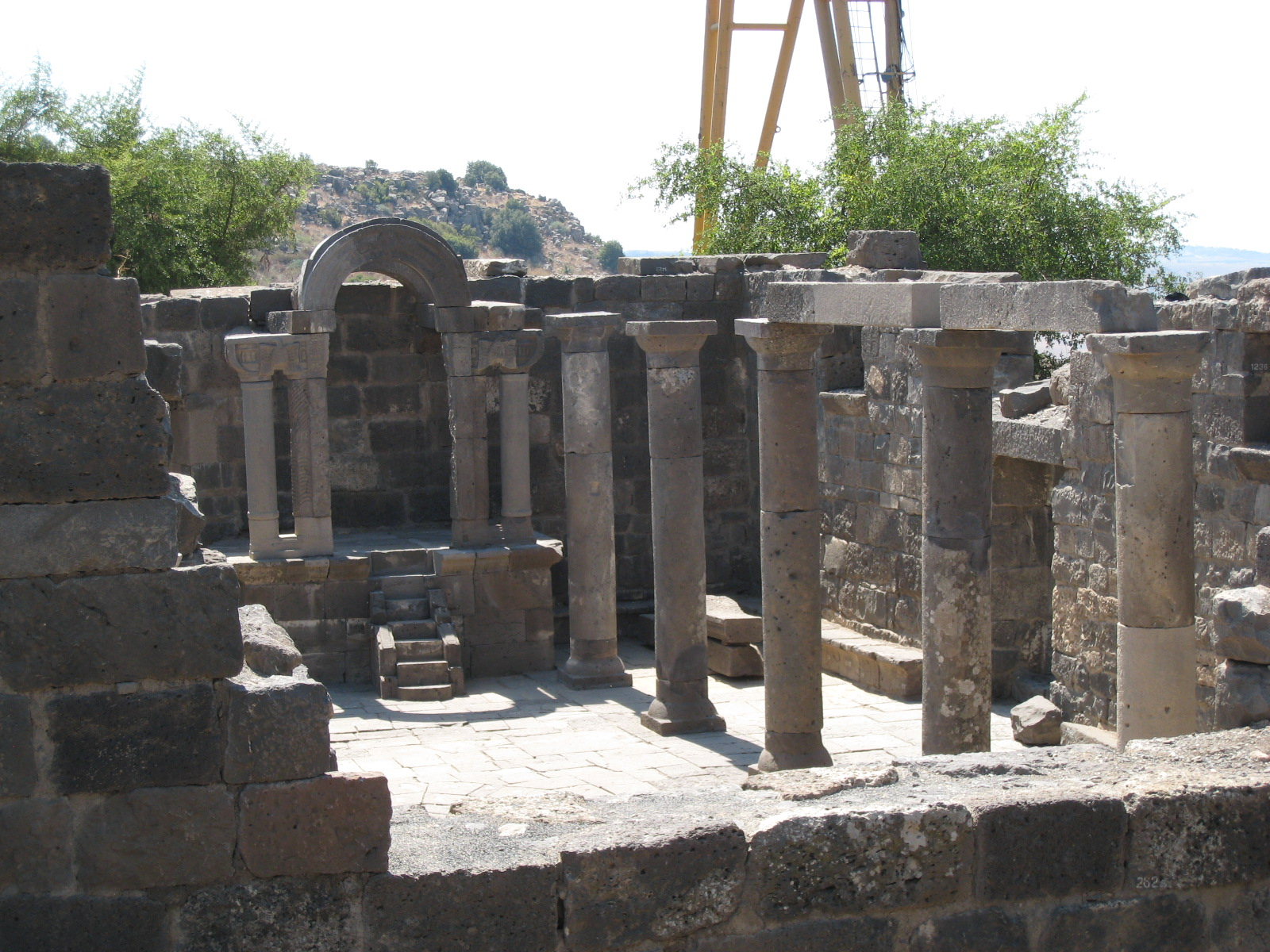
Umm el-Kanatir, "Mother of the Arches" synagogue, Golan Heights, dated to the 6th–8th century

Early in the 4th century, Roman Empire split and Constantinople became the capital of the East Roman Empire known as the Byzantine Empire. Under the Byzantines, Christianity, dominated by the (Greek) Eastern Orthodox Church, was adopted as the official religion. Jerusalem became a Christian city and Jews were still banned from living there.

In 351–352, there was another Jewish revolt against a corrupt Roman governor. The Jewish population in Sepphoris rebelled under the leadership of Patricius against the rule of Constantius Gallus. The revolt was eventually subdued by Ursicinus.

According to tradition, in 359 CE Hillel II created the Hebrew calendar based on the lunar year. Until then, The entire Jewish community outside the land of Israel depended on the calendar sanctioned by the Sanhedrin; this was necessary for the proper observance of the Jewish holy days. However, danger threatened the participants in that sanction and the messengers who communicated their decisions to distant congregations. As the religious persecutions continued, Hillel determined to provide an authorized calendar for all time to come.

During his short reign, Emperor Julian (361–363) abolished the special taxes paid by the Jews to the Roman government and also sought to ease the burden of mandatory Jewish financial support of the Jewish patriarchate. He also gave permission for the Jews to rebuild and populate Jerusalem. In one of his most remarkable endeavours, he initiated the restoration of the Jewish Temple which had been demolished in 70 CE. A contingent of thousands of Jews from Persian districts hoping to assist in the construction effort were killed en route by Persian soldiers. The great earthquake together with Julian's death put an end to Jewish hopes of rebuilding the Third Temple. Had the attempt been successful, it is likely that the re-establishment of the Jewish state with its sacrifices, priests and Sanhedrin or Senate would have occurred.

Jews probably constituted the majority of the population of Palestine until some time after Constantine converted to Christianity in the 4th century.

Jews lived in at least forty-three Jewish communities in Palestine: twelve towns on the coast, in the Negev, and east of the Jordan, and thirty-one villages in Galilee and in the Jordan valley. The persecuted Jews of Palestine revolted twice against their Christian rulers. In the 5th century, the Western Roman Empire collapsed leading to Christian migration into Palestine and development of a Christian majority. Jews numbered 10–15% of the population. Judaism was the only non-Christian religion tolerated, but there were bans on Jews building new places of worship, holding public office or owning slaves. There were also two Samaritan revolts during this period. While a vibrant Jewish center had continued to exist in the Galilee following the Jewish–Roman wars, its importance declined with increased persecutions. In 425 CE, after continued persecution by the Eastern Roman Empire, the Sanhedrin was disbanded on the order of Theodosius II.

In 438, The Empress Eudocia removed the ban on Jews' praying at the Temple site and the heads of the Community in Galilee issued a call "to the great and mighty people of the Jews": "Know that the end of the exile of our people has come"!

In about 450, the Jerusalem Talmud was completed.

According to Procopius, in 533 Byzantine general Belisarius took the treasures of the Jewish temple from Vandals who had taken them from Rome.

In 611, Sassanid Persia invaded the Byzantine Empire. In 613, a Jewish revolt against the Byzantine Empire led by Nehemiah ben Hushiel and Benjamin of Tiberias broke out. Jewish soldiers from Tiberias, Nazareth, and other Galilee settlements joined forces with these Persian invaders to capture Jerusalem in 614. The great majority of Christians in Jerusalem were subsequently deported to Persia. The Jews gained autonomy in Jerusalem, with Hushiel appointed ruler of the city. The capture of Jerusalem was interpreted by Jewish writers in a messianic context. Hushiel began making arrangements for the construction of the Third Temple and sorting out genealogies to establish a new High Priesthood. Jewish bands from Jerusalem, Tiberias, and the Galilee, joined by Jews from the diaspora communities of Damascus and Cyprus, also launched an expedition against Tyre after that city's Jewish community invited the rebels, but the expedition ultimately failed. Although the Jews had hoped that the Persians would grant them the entire Land of Israel, they were too few in number. Jewish dominance in Jerusalem lasted until 617, when the Persians reneged on their alliance with the Jews. Further Jewish settlement in and around Jerusalem was prohibited, a synagogue on the Temple Mount was demolished, and heavy taxes were imposed on the Jews. With return of the Byzantines in 628, the Byzantine Emperor Heraclius promised to restore Jewish rights and received Jewish help in ousting the Persians with the aid of Benjamin of Tiberias. Heraclius later reneged on the agreement after reconquering Palestine. A general massacre of the Jewish population ensued, devastating the Jewish communities of Jerusalem and the Galilee. Many Jewish refugees from Palestine fled to Egypt, and of the Jews who remained in Palestine, only those who took refuge in the mountains and deserts are said to have been spared. Jews were also banned from Jerusalem and prohibited from settling within a three-mile radius of the city. Egyptian Coptic Christians took responsibility for this broken pledge and still fast in penance.

== Middle Ages (638–1517) ==
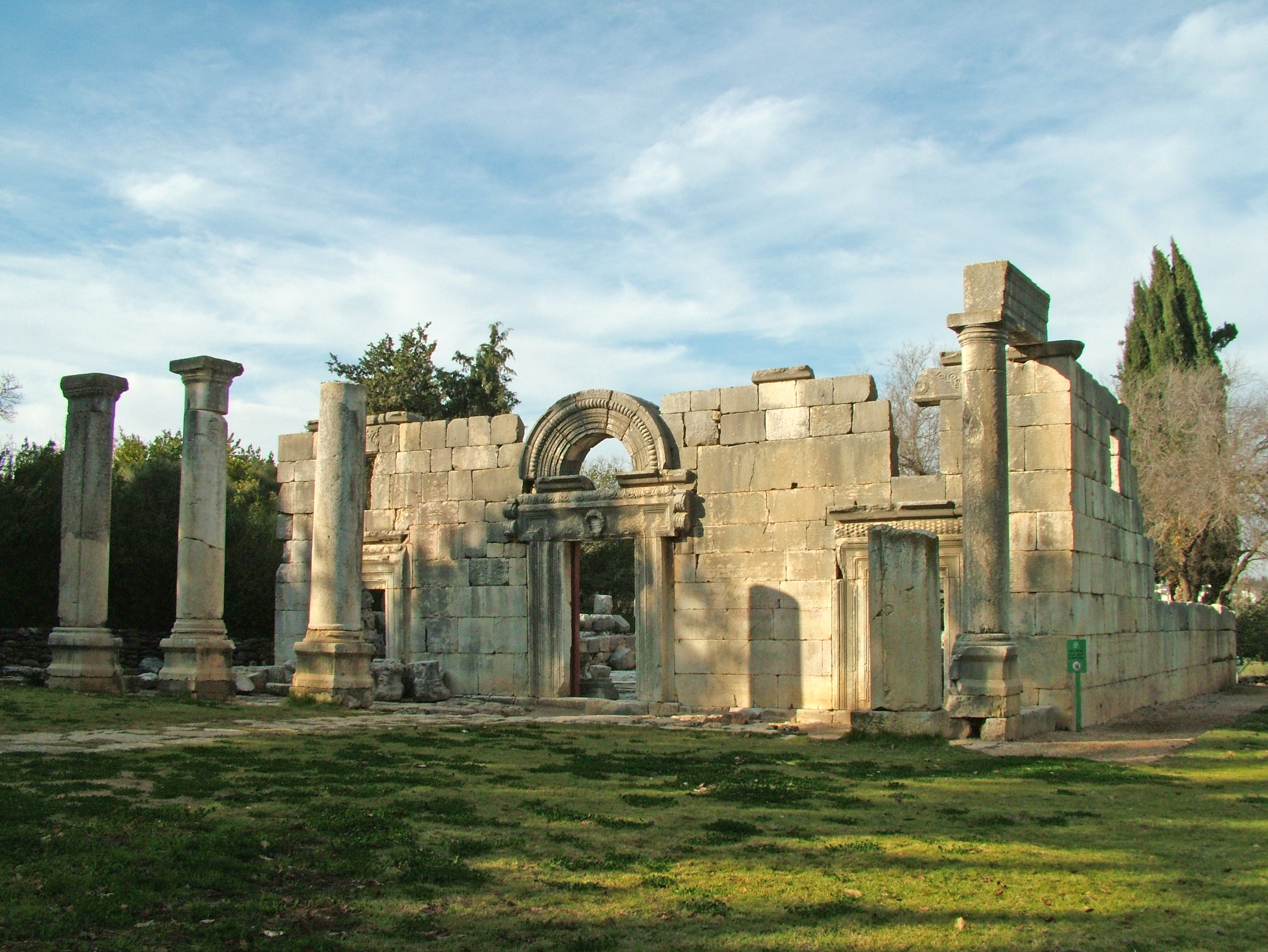
The ruins of the synagogue at Kfar Bar'am, an ancient Jewish village abandoned by its Jewish inhabitants sometime between the 7th and 13th centuries.

=== Under Islamic rule (638–1099) ===
Islamic period

638
Umar allows Jews back
into Jerusalem
691–705
Islamization of the Temple Mount
720
Jews permanently excluded
from ascending Temple Mount
c. 750
Yeshiva of Eretz Israel based in
Tiberias
c. 850
Seat of the Gaonate
transferred to Jerusalem
875
Mourners of Zion reside in
Jerusalem
921
Controversy erupts regarding
calendrical calculations of
Aaron ben Meïr
960
Masorete Aaron ben Asher
dies in Tiberias
1071
Gaonate exiled to Tyre

In 638 CE, the Byzantine Empire lost the Levant to the Arab Islamic Empire. According to Moshe Gil, at the time of the Arab conquest in the 7th century, the majority of the population was Jewish or Samaritan. According to one estimate, the Jews of Palestine numbered between 300,000 and 400,000 at the time. This is contrary to other estimates which place the Jewish population at the time of the revolt against Heraclius as between 150,000 and 200,000. After the conquest, the majority of the existing Christian Aramaic-speaking population adopted Islam, the Arabic language, and added elements of Arab culture. The Muslims continued to ban the building of new synagogues. Until the Crusades took Palestine in 1099, various Muslim dynasties controlled Palestine. It was first ruled by the Medinah-based Rashidun Caliphs, then by the Damascus-based Umayyad Caliphate and after by the Baghdad-based Abbasid Caliphs. In the early Middle Ages, the Jewish communities of Palestine were dispersed among the key cities of the military districts of Jund Filastin and Jund al-Urdunn, with a number of poor Jewish villages existing in the Galilee and Judea.

In succeeding centuries a common view is that Christians and Muslims were equally divided. The conversion of the Christians to Islam - Gil maintaining they were a majority - is generally thought to have occurred on a large scale only after the Crusades, in the wake of Saladin's conquest, and as a result of disaffection for the Latins.

Historical sources mention the settlement of Arab tribes and the establishment of new settlements in the 7th century, although few archaeological records have been preserved. However some Arabian settlements like Khirbet Suwwwana, located on the outskirts of Jerusalem, provide archaeological records of Islamic nomadic settlement and sedentarization among the local population. The establishment of new Arab settlements during the 7th and 8th century was relatively rare. The religious transformation of the land is evident with large congregation style mosques built in cities like Tiberias, Jarash, Beth Shean, Jerusalem and possibly Cesarea. However, the establishment of these mosques points to the influx of Muslim newcomers, rather than to conversion of Jews and Christians to Islam. The settlement map of the land changed dramatically between the 6th and 11th centuries. The sixth century map reveals an urban and rural society at its height, while the 11th century map shows a society that was economically and physically stagnant veering toward total collapse.

After the conquest, Jewish communities began to grow and flourish. Umar allowed and encouraged Jews to settle in Jerusalem. It was the first time, after almost 500 years of oppressive Christian rule, that Jews were allowed to enter and worship freely in their holy city. Seventy Jewish families from Tiberias moved to Jerusalem in order to help strengthen the Jewish community there. But with the construction of the Dome of the Rock in 691 and the Al-Aqsa Mosque in 705, the Muslims established the Temple Mount as an Islamic holy site. The dome enshrined the Foundation Stone, the holiest site for Jews. Before Omar Abd al-Aziz died in 720, he banned the Jews from worshipping on the Temple Mount, a policy which remained in place for over the next 1,000 years of Islamic rule. In 717, new restrictions were imposed against non-Muslims that affected the Jews' status. As a result of the imposition of heavy taxes on agricultural land, many Jews were forced to migrate from rural areas to towns. Social and economic discrimination caused substantial Jewish emigration from Palestine. In addition, Muslim civil wars in the 8th and 9th centuries drove many non-Muslims out of the country, with no evidence of mass conversions except among Samaritans. By the end of the 11th century, the Jewish population of Palestine had declined substantially and lost some of its organizational and religious cohesiveness.

In around 875, Karaite leader Daniel al-Kumisi arrived in Jerusalem and established an ascetic community of Mourners of Zion. Michael the Syrian notes thirty synagogues which were destroyed in Tiberias by the earthquake of 749.

In the mid-8th-century, taking advantage of the warring Islamic factions in Palestine, a Persian Jewish false messiah from Isfahan named Abu Isa Obadiah inspired and organised a group of 10,000 armed Jews who hoped to restore the Holy Land to the Jewish nation. Soon after, when Al-Mansur came to power, Abu Isa joined forces with a Persian chieftain who was also conducting a rebellion against the caliph. The rebellion was subdued by the caliph and Abu Isa fell in battle in 755.

From at least the middle of the ninth century, possibly earlier, to the 11th century, the Palestinian Gaonate served as the chief Talmudic academy and central legalistic body of the Jewish community in Palestine. The Gaonate moved from Tiberias to Jerusalem in the mid-ninth century. It competed with the Babylonian Gaonate for the support of diaspora communities. In 1071, after Jerusalem was conquered by the Seljuq Turks, the Gaonate was expelled from Jerusalem and relocated to Tyre.

In 1039, part of the synagogue in Ramla was still in ruins, probably resulting from the earthquake of 1033. Jews also returned to Rafah and documents from 1015 and 1080 attest to a significant community there.

A large Jewish community existed in Ramle and smaller communities inhabited Hebron and the coastal cities of Acre, Caesarea Maritima, Jaffa, Ascalon and Gaza. Al-Muqaddasi (985) wrote that "for the most part the assayers of corn, dyers, bankers, and tanners are Jews." Under the Islamic rule, the rights of Jews and Christians were curtailed and residence was permitted upon payment of the special tax.

Between the 7th and 11th centuries, Masoretes (Jewish scribes) in the Galilee and Jerusalem were active in compiling a system of pronunciation and grammatical guides of the Hebrew language. They authorised the division of the Jewish Tanakh, known as the Masoretic Text, which is still regarded as authoritative today.

=== Under Crusader rule (1099–1291) ===
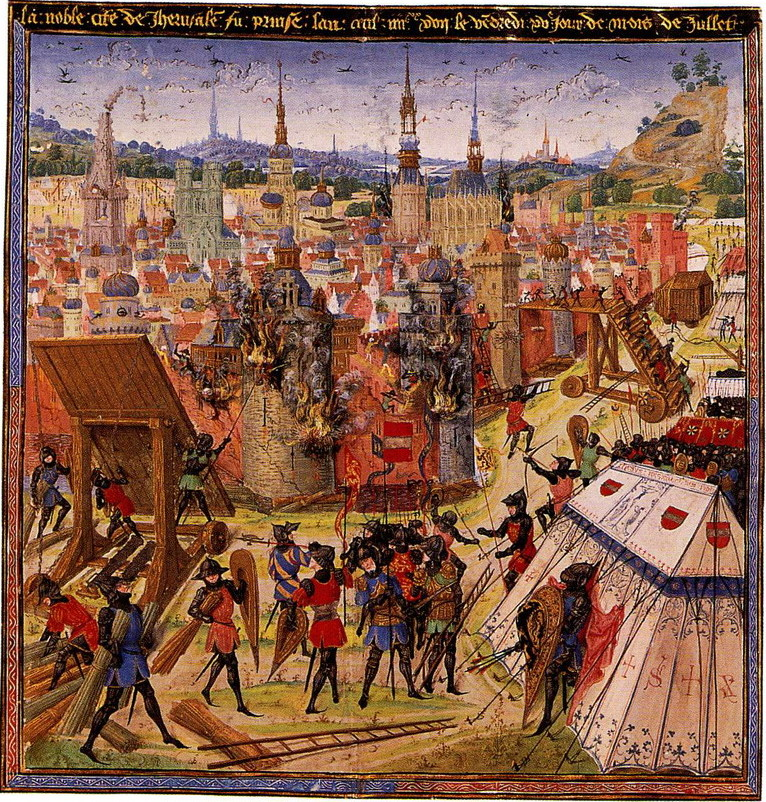
Capture of Jerusalem, 1099

According to Gilbert, from 1099 to 1291 the Christian Crusaders "mercilessly persecuted and slaughtered the Jews of Palestine."

In the crusading era, there were significant Jewish communities in several cities and Jews are known to have fought alongside Arabs against the Christian invaders. During the First Crusade, Jews were among the rest of the population who tried in vain to defend Jerusalem against the Crusaders during the Siege of Jerusalem. When Jerusalem fell, a massacre of Jews occurred when the synagogue they were seeking refuge in was set alight. Almost all perished. In Haifa, the Jewish inhabitants fought side by side with the Fatimid garrison in defending the city, and held out for a whole month, (June–July 1099). Jews encountered as the Crusaders travelled across Europe were given a choice of conversion or murder, and almost always chose martyrdom. The carnage continued when the Crusaders reached the Holy Land. Ashkenazi Orthodox Jews still recite a prayer in memory of the death and destruction caused by the Crusades.

Under Crusader rule, Jews were not allowed to hold land and involved themselves in commerce in the coastal towns during times of quiescence. Most of them were artisans: glassblowers in Sidon, furriers and dyers in Jerusalem. At this time there were Jewish communities scattered all over the country, including Jerusalem, Tiberias, Ramleh, Ascalon, Caesarea, and Gaza. In line with trail of bloodshed the Crusaders left in Europe on their way to conquer the Holy Land, in Palestine, both Muslims and Jews were indiscriminately massacred or sold into slavery. The Jewish community in Jerusalem was destroyed and would not be reconstituted for years, as most Jewish residents of the city were killed and the survivors were sold into slavery, some of whom were later redeemed by Jewish communities in Italy and Egypt. The redeemed slaves were subsequently brought to Egypt. Some Jewish prisoners of war were also deported by the Crusaders to Apulia in southern Italy. The Jewish communities of Jaffa and Ramleh were dispersed. However, Jewish communities in the Galilee were left unscathed.

Jewish communities in Palestine were apparently left undisturbed during the Second Crusade. Benjamin of Tudela and Pethahiah of Regensburg, who visited Palestine around 1160 and 1180 respectively, found well-established Jewish communities in Ascalon, Ramleh, Caesarea, Tiberias, and Acre, with communities in other localities and scattered individual Jews living elsewhere. However, they found only a handful of Jews in Jerusalem.

A large volume of piyutim and midrashim originated in Palestine at this time. In 1165 Maimonides visited Jerusalem and prayed on the Temple Mount, in the "great, holy house". In 1141 Spanish poet, Yehuda Halevi, issued a call to the Jews to emigrate to the Land of Israel, a journey he undertook himself.

=== Decline and gradual revival with increased immigration (1211–1517) ===
12th to 14th century

1191
Jews of Ascalon arrive in Jerusalem
1198
Maghreb Jews arrive in Jerusalem
1204
Maimonides buried in Tiberias
1209–1211
Immigration of 300 French and
English rabbis
1217
Judah al-Harizi bemoans state
of the Temple Mount
1260
Yechiel of Paris establishes
talmudical academy in Acre
1266
Jews banned from entering the
Cave of the Patriarchs in Hebron
1267
Nachmanides arrives in Jerusalem,
Ramban synagogue established
1286
Meir of Rothenburg incarcerated
after attempting to emigrate
to Mamluk Palestine
1355
Physician and geographer
Ishtori Haparchi dies in Bet She'an

15th century

1428
Jews attempt to purchase Tomb
of David, Pope prevents ships
carrying Jews to Mamluk Palestine
1434
Elijah of Ferrara settles in Jerusalem
1441
Famine forces Jerusalem Jews to
send emissary to Europe
1455
Failed large scale immigration
attempt from Sicily
1474
Great Synagogue of Jerusalem
demolished by Arab mob
1488
Obadiah ben Abraham begins
revival of Jerusalem
1507
Joseph Saragossi dies in
Safed

The Crusader rule over Palestine had taken its toll on the Jews. Relief came in 1187 when Ayyubid Sultan Saladin defeated the Crusaders in the Battle of Hattin, taking Jerusalem and most of Palestine. (A Crusader state centered around Acre survived in weakened form for another century.) In time, Saladin issued a proclamation inviting all Jews to return and settle in Jerusalem, and according to Judah al-Harizi, they did: "From the day the Arabs took Jerusalem, the Israelites inhabited it." al-Harizi compared Saladin's decree allowing Jews to re-establish themselves in Jerusalem to the one issued by the Persian Cyrus the Great over 1,600 years earlier.

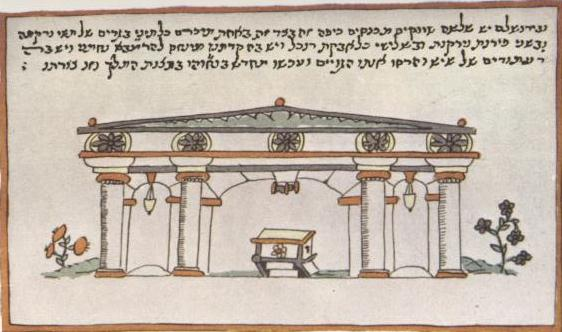
Synagogue of Nachmanides, Casale Pilgrim (16th-century)

In 1211, the Jewish community in the country was strengthened by the arrival of a group headed by over 300 rabbis from France and England, among them Rabbi Samson ben Abraham of Sens. The motivation of European Jews to emigrate to the Holyland in the 13th-century possibly lay in persecution, economic hardship, messianic expectations or the desire to fulfill the commandments specific to the land of Israel. In 1217, Spanish pilgrim Judah al-Harizi found the sight of the non-Jewish structures on the Temple Mount profoundly disturbing: "What torment to see our holy courts converted into an alien temple!" he wrote. During his visit, al-Harizi found a prosperous Jewish community living in the city. From 1219 to 1220, most of Jerusalem was destroyed on the orders of Al-Mu'azzam Isa, who wanted to remove all Crusader fortifications in the Levant, and as a result, the Jewish community, along with the majority of the rest of the population, left the city.

Nachmanides, the 13th-century Spanish rabbi and recognised leader of Jewry greatly praised the land of Israel and viewed its settlement as a positive commandment incumbent on all Jews. He wrote, "If the gentiles wish to make peace, we shall make peace and leave them on clear terms; but as for the land, we shall not leave it in their hands, nor in the hands of any nation, not in any generation." In 1267 he arrived in Jerusalem and found only two Jewish inhabitants – brothers, dyers by trade. Wishing to re-establish a strong Jewish presence in the holy city, he brought a Torah scroll from Nablus and founded a synagogue. Nahmanides later settled at Acre, where he headed a yeshiva together with Yechiel of Paris who had emigrated to Acre in 1260, along with his son and a large group of followers. Upon arrival, he had established the Beth Midrash ha-Gadol d'Paris Talmudic academy where one of the greatest Karaite authorities, Aaron ben Joseph the Elder, was said to have attended.

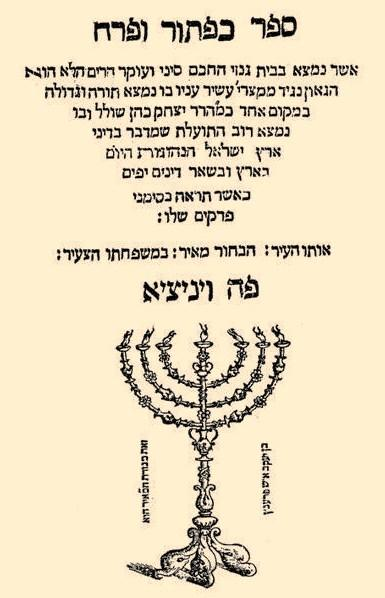
Title page of Ishtori Haparchi's Kaftor Vaferech, Venice 1549. In the first Hebrew book printed on the geography of Palestine, 180 locations mentioned in the Bible and Talmudic literature are identified.

In 1260, control passed to the Egyptian Mamluks and until 1291 Palestine became the frontier between Mongol invaders (occasional Crusader allies). The conflict impoverished the country and severely reduced the population. Sultan Qutuz of Egypt eventually defeated the Mongols in the Battle of Ain Jalut (near Ein Harod) and his successor (and assassin), Baibars, eliminated the last Crusader Kingdom of Acre in 1291, thereby ending the Crusader presence. Mamluk rule was to last until the Ottoman Empire conquered Palestine in 1517.

The era of Mamluk rule saw the Jewish population shrink substantially due to oppression and economic stagnation. The Mamluks razed Palestine's coastal cities, which had traditionally been trading centers that energized the economy, as they had also served as entry points for the Crusaders and the Mamluks wished to prevent any further Christian conquests. Mamluk misrule resulted in severe social and economic decline, and as the economy shrank, so did tax revenues, leading the Mamluks to raise taxes, with non-Muslims being taxed especially heavily. They also stringently enforced the dhimmi laws and added new oppressive and humiliating rules on top of the traditional dhimmi laws. Palestine's population decreased by two-thirds as people left the country and the Jewish and Christian communities declined especially heavily. Muslims became an increasingly larger percentage of the shrinking population. Although the Jewish population declined greatly during Mamluk rule, this period also saw repeated waves of Jewish immigration from Europe, North Africa, and Syria. These immigration waves possibly saved the collapsing Jewish community of Palestine from disappearing altogether.

In 1266 the Mamluk Sultan Baybars converted the Cave of the Patriarchs in Hebron into an exclusive Islamic sanctuary and banned Christians and Jews from entering. They previously were able to enter it for a fee. The ban remained in place until Israel took control of the building in 1967. In 1286, leader of German Jewry Meir of Rothenburg, was imprisoned by Rudolf I for attempting to lead a large group of Jews hoping to settle in Palestine. Exiled from France in 1306, Ishtori Haparchi (d. 1355) arrived in Palestine and settled Bet She'an in 1313. Over the next seven years, he compiled an informative geographical account of the land in which he attempts to identify biblical and talmudic era locations. Two other noted Spanish kabbalists, Hananel ibn Askara and Shem Tov ibn Gaon, emigrated to Safed around this time. During the tolerant reign of Nassir Mahomet (1299–1341) Jewish pilgrims from Egypt and Syria were able to spend the festivals in Jerusalem, which had a large Jewish community. Many of the Jerusalem Jews occupied themselves with study of the codes and the kabbalah. Others were artisans, merchants, calligraphers, or physicians. The vibrant community of Hebron engaged in weaving, dyeing, and glassware manufacturing; others were shepherds.

The 1428 attempt by German Jews to acquire rooms and buildings on Mount Zion over the Tomb of David had dire consequences. The Franciscans, who had occupied the site since 1335, petitioned Pope Martin V who issued a papal order prohibiting sea captains from carrying Jews to Palestine. In 1438, Italian rabbi Elijah of Ferrara settled in Jerusalem and became a lecturer and dayyan. In 1455, a large group of prospective emigrants from across Sicily were arrested for attempting to sail to Palestine. Not wanting to forfeit revenue made from special Jewish taxes, the authorities were against the mass emigration of Jews and accused the group of planning to illegally smuggle gold off the island. After nine months of imprisonment, a heavy ransom freed 24 Jews who were then granted permission to travel to Palestine so long as they abandoned all their property.

In 1470, Isaac b. Meir Latif arrived from Ancona and counted 150 Jewish families in Jerusalem. In 1473, the authorities closed down the Nachmanides Synagogue after part of it had collapsed in a heavy rainstorm. A year later, after an appealing to Sultan Qaitbay, the Jews were given permission to repair it. The Muslims of the adjoining mosque however contested the verdict and for two days, proceeded to demolish the synagogue completely. The vandals were punished, but the synagogue was only rebuilt 50 years later in 1523. 1481 saw Italian Joseph Mantabia being appointed dayyan in Jerusalem. A few years later in 1488, Italian commentator and spiritual leader of Jewry, Obadiah ben Abraham arrived in Jerusalem. He found the city forsaken holding about seventy poor Jewish families. By 1495, there were 200 families. Obadiah, a dynamic and erudite leader, had begun the rejuvenation of Jerusalem's Jewish community. This, despite the fact many refugees from the Spanish and Portuguese expulsion of 1492-97 stayed away worried about the lawlessness of Mamluk rule. An anonymous letter of the time lamented: "In all these lands there is no judgement and no judge, especially for the Jews against Arabs." Mass immigration would start after the Turks conquered the region in 1517. Yet in Safed, the situation fared better. Thanks to Joseph Saragossi who had arrived in the closing years of the 15th century, Safed and its environs had developed into the largest concentration of Jews in Palestine. With the help of the Sephardic immigration from Spain, the Jewish population had increased to 10,000 by the early 16th century. Twenty-five years earlier Joseph Mantabia had counted just 300 families in and around Safed. The first record of Jews at Safed was provided by French explorer Samuel ben Samson 300 years earlier in 1210 when he found only 50 Jews in residence. At the beginning of the 17th century, Safed was to boast eighteen talmudical colleges and twenty-one synagogues.

Records cite at least 30 Jewish urban and rural communities in the country at the beginning of the 16th century.

== Modern history (1517–present) ==
=== Ottoman rule (1517–1917) ===
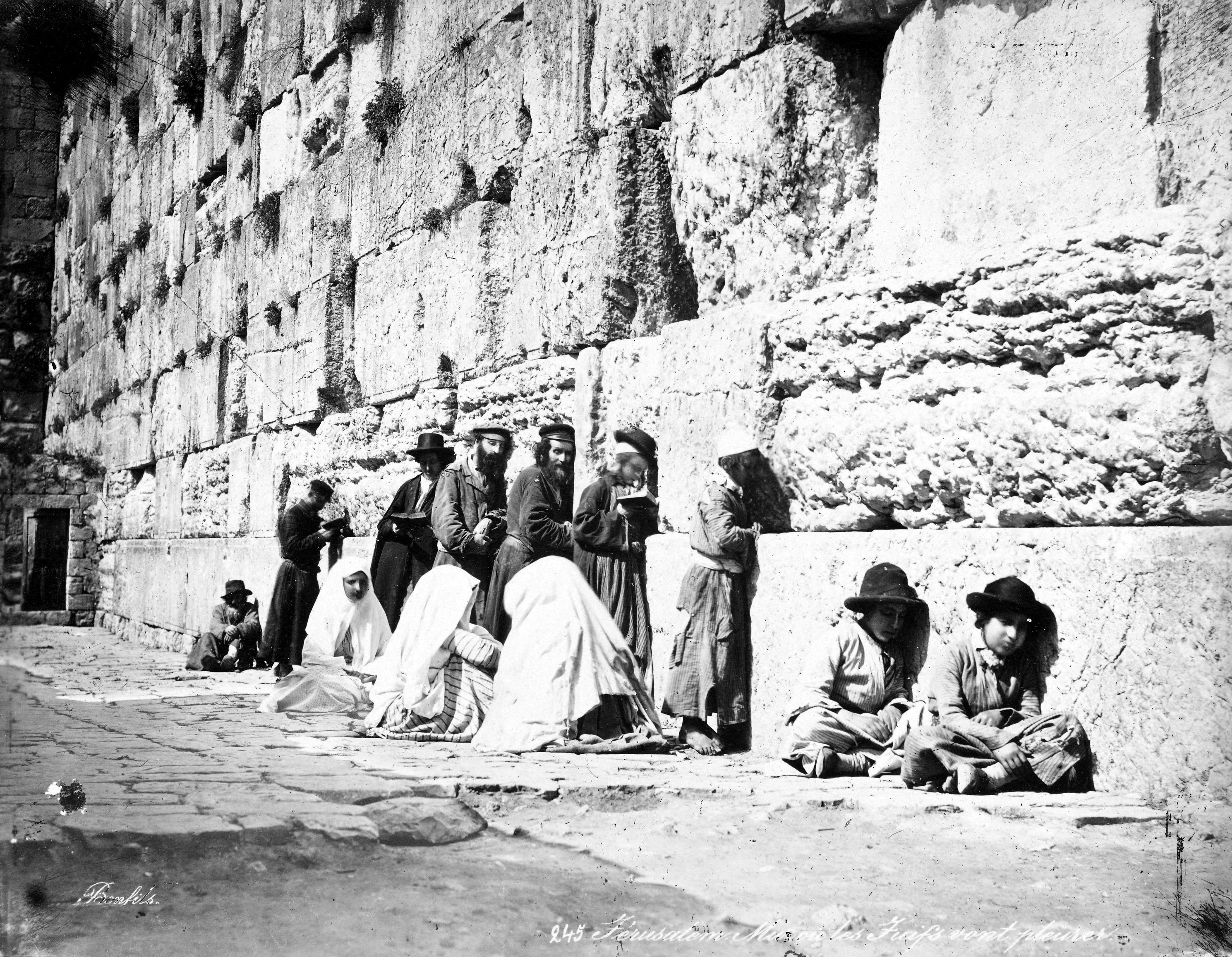
One of the earliest photographs of Jews praying at the Western Wall of Herod's Temple, 1870s. The Scroll of Ahimaaz (1050 CE) mentions the location as a Jewish prayer site. In around 1560, Suleiman the Magnificent gave official recognition of the right of Jews to pray there.

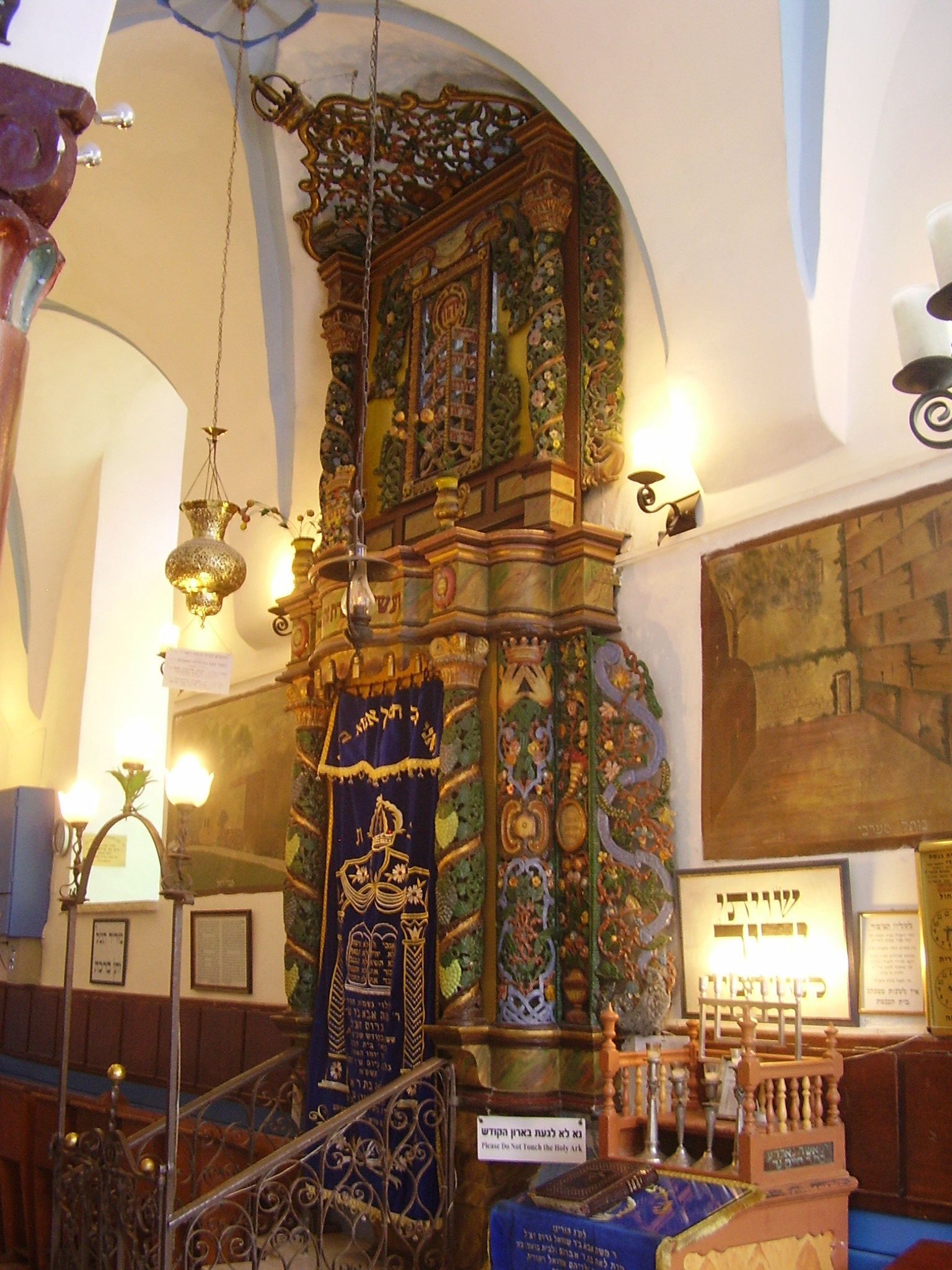
The Ari Synagogue in Safed. Founded in the 1570s, it was rebuilt in 1857 following an earthquake.

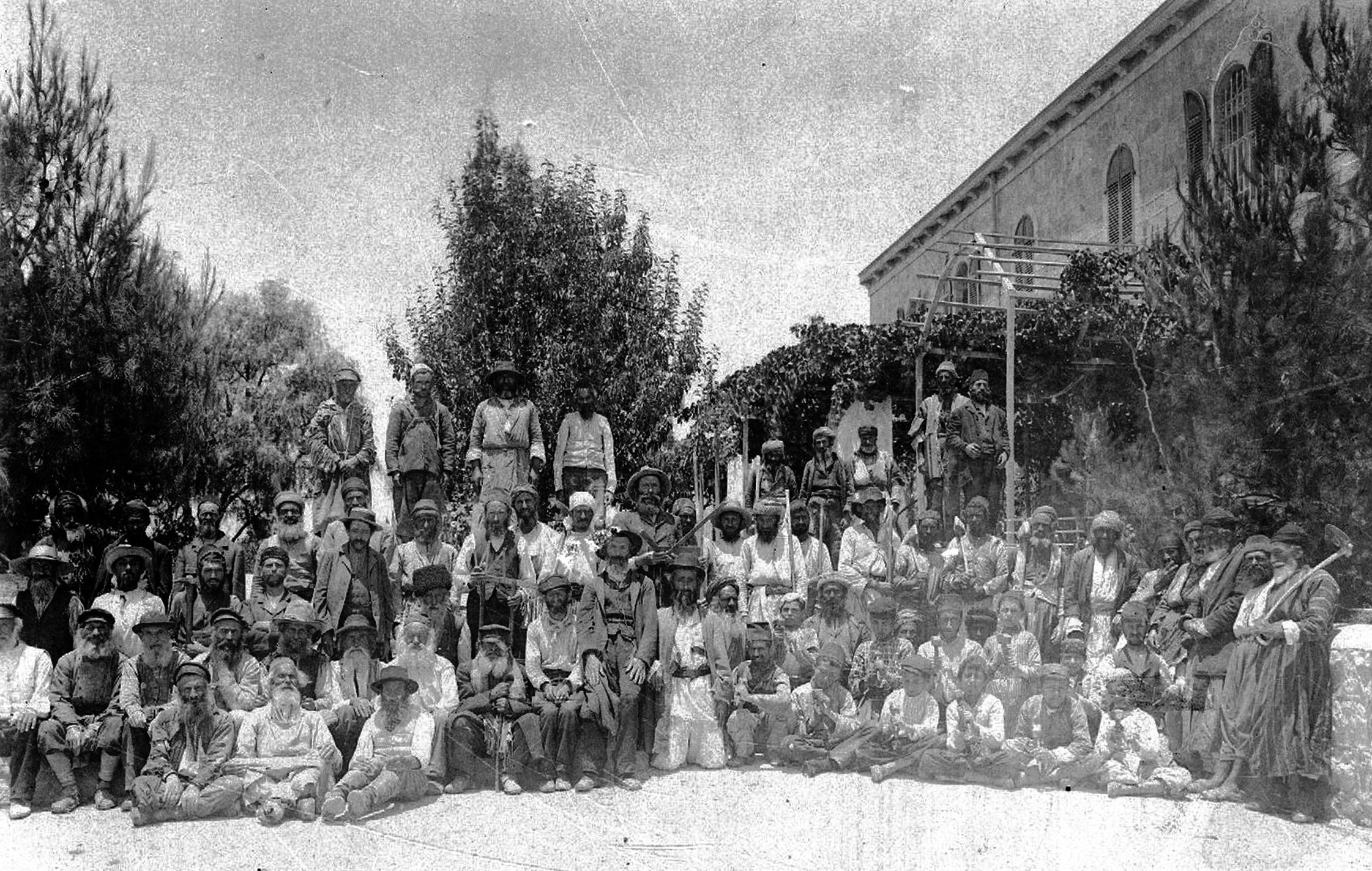
Jewish workers in the Kerem Avraham neighborhood of Jerusalem in the mid-19th century

Palestine was conquered by Turkish Sultan Selim II in 1516–17, and became part of the province of Syria for the next four centuries. At the onset of Ottoman rule in 1517, there were an estimated 5,000 Jews, comprising about 1,000 Jewish families, in Palestine. Jews mainly lived in Jerusalem, Nablus, Hebron, Gaza, Safed, and villages in the Galilee. The Jewish community was composed of both descendants of Jews who had never left the land and Jewish migrants from the diaspora.

In 1534, Spanish refugee Jacob Berab settled in Safed. He believed the time was ripe to reintroduce the old "semikhah" (ordination) which would create for Jews worldwide a recognised central authority. In 1538, an assembly of twenty-five Safed rabbis ordained Berab, a step which they hoped would instigate the formation of a new Sanhedrin. But the plan faltered upon a strong and concerted protest by the chief rabbi of Jerusalem, Levi ben Jacob ibn Habib. Additionally, worried about a scheme which would invest excessive authority in a Jewish senate, possibly resulting in the first step toward the restoration of the Jewish state, the new Ottoman rulers forced Berab to flee Palestine and the plan did not materialize.

The 16th-century nevertheless saw a resurgence of Jewish life in Palestine. Palestinian rabbis were instrumental in producing a universally accepted manual of Jewish law and some of the most beautiful liturgical poems. Much of this activity occurred at Safed, which had become a spiritual centre, a haven for mystics. Joseph Karo's comprehensive guide to Jewish law, the Shulchan Aruch, was considered so authoritative that the variant customs of German-Polish Jewry were merely added as supplement glosses. Some of the most celebrated hymns were written in Safed by poets such as Israel Najara and Solomon Alkabetz. The town was also a centre of Jewish mysticism; notable kabbalists included Moses Cordovero and the German-born Naphtali Hertz ben Jacob Elhanan. A new method of understanding the kabbalah was developed by Palestinian mystic Isaac Luria and espoused by his student Chaim Vital. In Safed, the Jews developed a number of branches of trade, especially in grain, spices, textiles and dyeing. In 1577, a Hebrew printing press was established in Safed. The 8,000 or 10,000 Jews in Safed in 1555 grew to 20,000 or 30,000 by the end of the century.

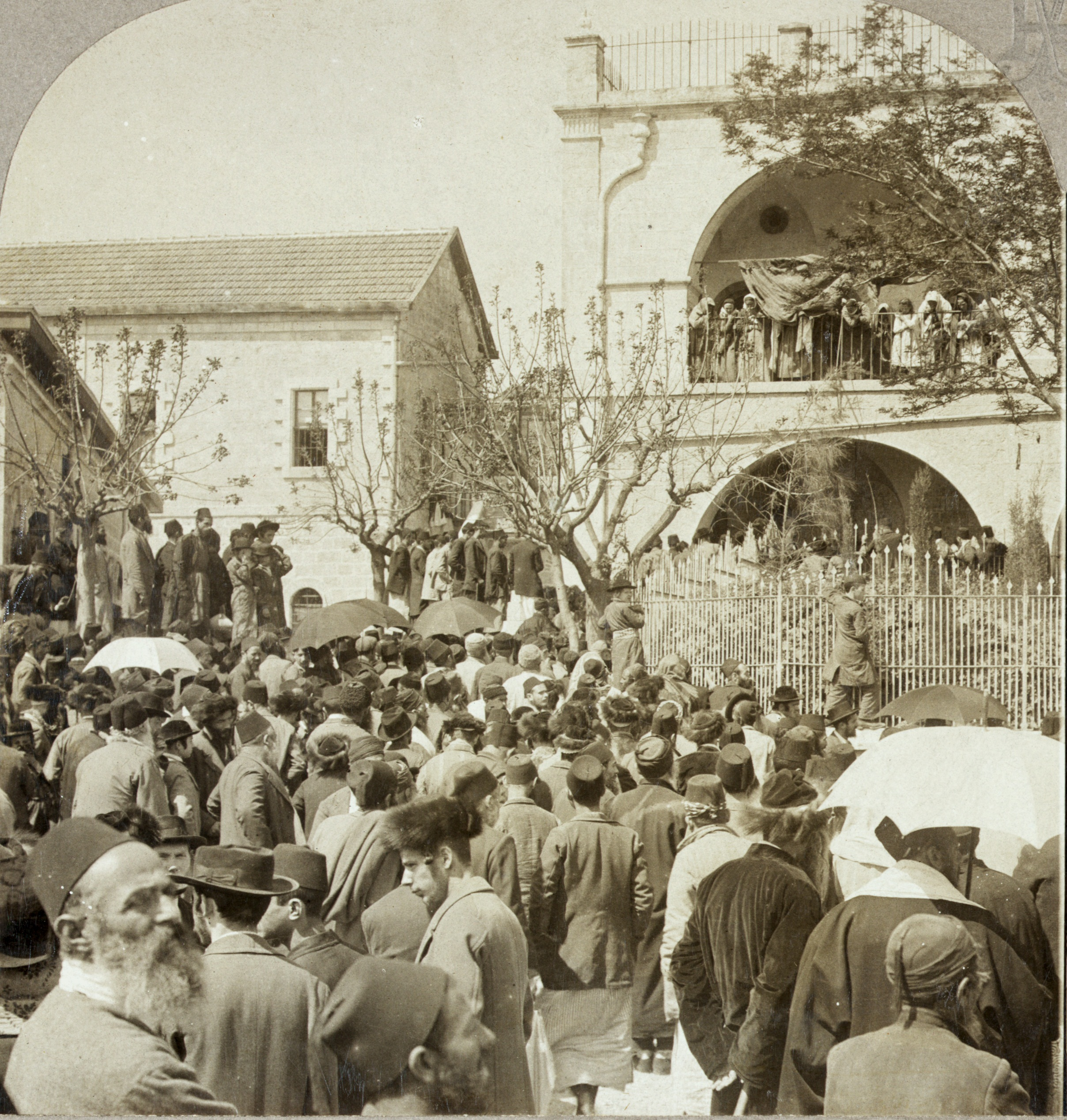
The funeral of a rabbi in Jerusalem, 1903.

In around 1563, Joseph Nasi secured permission from Sultan Selim II to acquire Tiberias and seven surrounding villages to create a Jewish city-state. He hoped that large numbers of Jewish refugees and Marranos would settle there, free from fear and oppression; indeed, the persecuted Jews of Cori, Italy, numbering about 200, decided to emigrate to Tiberias. Nasi had the walls of the town rebuilt by 1564 and attempted to turn it into a self-sufficient textile manufacturing center by planting mulberry trees for the cultivation of silk. Nevertheless, a number of factors during the following years contributed to the plan's ultimate failure. Nasi's aunt, Doña Gracia Mendes Nasi supported a yeshiva in the town for many years until her death in 1569.

In 1567, a Yemenite scholar and Rabbi, Zechariah Dhahiri, visited Safed and wrote of his experiences in a book entitled Sefer Ha-Musar. His vivid descriptions of the town Safed and of Rabbi Joseph Karo's yeshiva are of primary importance to historians, seeing that they are a first-hand account of these places, and the only extant account which describes the yeshiva of the great Sephardic Rabbi, Joseph Karo.

In 1576, the Jewish community of Safed faced an expulsion order: 1,000 prosperous families were to be deported to Cyprus, "for the good of the said island", with another 500 the following year. The order was later rescinded due to the realisation of the financial gains of Jewish rental income. In 1586, the Jews of Istanbul agreed to build a fortified khan to provide a refuge for Safed's Jews against "night bandits and armed thieves."

In 1569, the Radbaz moved to Jerusalem, but soon moved to Safed to escape the high taxes imposed on Jews by the authorities.

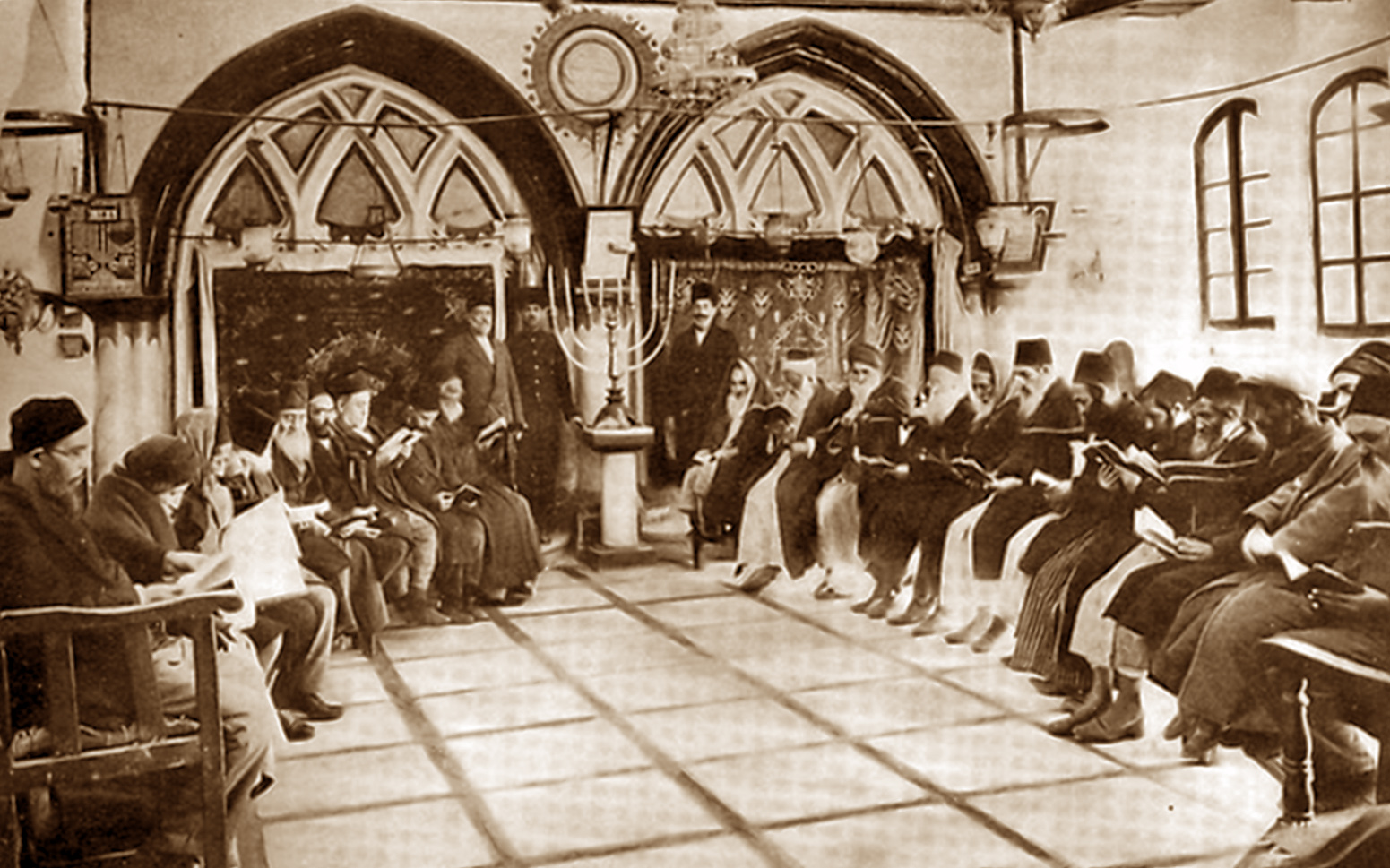
Installation of the Chacham Bashi at the Ben Zakai Synagogue, 1893. According to legend, the synagogue stands on the site of the study hall of 1st-century sage, Rabban Yochanan ben Zakai. The current building was constructed in 1610.

In 1610, the Yochanan ben Zakai Synagogue in Jerusalem was completed. It became the main synagogue of the Sephardic Jews, the place where their chief rabbi was invested. The adjacent study hall which had been added by 1625 later became the Synagogue of Elijah the Prophet.

In the 1648–1654 Khmelnytsky Uprising in Ukraine over 100,000 Jews were massacred, leading to some migration to Israel. In 1660 (or 1662), the majority Jewish towns of Safed and Tiberias were destroyed by the Druze, following a power struggle in Galilee.

The 17th century saw a steep decline in the Jewish population of Palestine due to the unstable security situation, natural catastrophes, and abandonment of urban areas, which turned Palestine into a remote and desolate part of the Ottoman Empire. The Ottoman central government became feeble and corrupt, and the Jewish community was harassed by local rulers, janissaries, guilds, Bedouins, and bandits. The Jewish community was also caught between feuding local chieftains who extorted and oppressed the Jews. The Jewish communities of the Galilee heavily depended on the changing fortunes of a banking family close to the ruling pashas in Acre. As a result, the Jewish population significantly shrank.

In 1700, about 500 to 1,000 European Jewish followers of Judah HeHasid immigrated to Palestine and settled in Jerusalem. They were forced to give the Turkish authorities financial guarantees in the name of Jerusalem's Jewish community in exchange for permission to enter the Ottoman Empire. At the time approximately 200 Ashkenazi Jews and 1,000 Sephardi Jews lived in the city, most of them reliant on charity from the diaspora. The sudden influx of so many Ashkenazi immigrants produced a crisis. The local community was unable to help so many people and suspected some of the new arrivals of being Sabbateans, whom they viewed with hostility. The newcomers built the Hurva Synagogue and incurred debts doing so. In 1720, due to failure to repay the debts, Arab creditors broke into the synagogue, set it on fire, and took over the area. The Ottoman authorities held both HeHasid's group and the pre-existing Ashkenazi community collectively responsible and expelled all Ashkenazi Jews from Jerusalem.

In 1714, Dutch researcher Adriaan Reland published an account of his visit to Palestine, and noted the existence of significant Jewish population centers throughout the country, particularly Jerusalem, Safed, Tiberias, and Gaza. Hebron also had a significant Jewish community at the time. The 18th century saw the Jewish population slightly recover. In 1740, Rabbi Haim Abulafia, the rabbi of İzmir, renewed Jewish settlement in Tiberias and the surrounding area under the patronage of local governor Zahir al-Umar. In 1742, a group of Jewish immigrants from Morocco and Italy led by Moroccan rabbi Chaim ibn Attar arrived in Palestine, and most settled in Jerusalem. At the time, the vast majority of Jews in Palestine were Sephardi or Mizrahi Jews, with only a small number of Ashkenazi Jews. The Ottoman authorities restricted the number of Jews permitted to live in Jerusalem. The Near East earthquake of 1759 destroyed much of Safed, killing 2,000 people with 190 Jews among the dead, and also destroyed Tiberias. In 1777, a group of about 300 Hasidic Jews from Lithuania led by Rabbi Menachem Mendel of Vitebsk immigrated to Palestine. This was the first group of Jewish immigrants in some time that maintained contact with its country of origin. They had considered settling in Safed but due to the opposition this aroused most settled in Tiberias and some settled in Peki'in instead. They augmented the Jewish presence in the Galilee and extended the Ashkenazi presence to places outside Safed, where it had been concentrated until then. In 1800, there were about 6,500 Jews living in Palestine.

In the early 19th century, the disciples of the Vilna Gaon, a prominent rabbi in Eastern Europe, who were known as the Perushim, settled in the land of Israel. They came almost a decade after the arrival of two of his pupils, R. Hayim of Vilna and R. Israel ben Samuel of Shklov. In all there were three groups of the Gaon's students which emigrated to the land of Israel. They formed the basis of the Ashkenazi communities of Jerusalem and Safed. Their arrival encouraged an Ashkenazi revival in Jerusalem, whose Jewish community was mostly Sephardi following the expulsion of the Ashkenazim nearly a century earlier. Many of the descendants of the disciples became leading figures in modern Israeli society. The Gaon himself also set forth with his pupils to the Land, but for an unknown reason he turned back and returned to Vilna, where he died soon after.

During the siege of Acre in 1799, Napoleon issued a proclamation to the Jews of Asia and Africa to help him conquer Jerusalem. The siege was lost to the British, however, and the plan was never carried out.

In 1821 the brothers of murdered Jewish adviser and finance minister to the rulers of the Galilee, Haim Farkhi, formed an army with Ottoman permission, marched south and conquered the Galilee. They were held up at Akko which they besieged for 14 months after which they gave up and retreated to Damascus.

During the Peasants' Revolt under Muhammad Ali of Egypt's occupation, Jews were targeted in the 1834 looting of Safed and the 1834 Hebron massacre. By 1844, some sources report that Jews had become the largest population group in Jerusalem and by 1890 an absolute majority in the city, but as a whole the Jewish population made up far less than 10% of the region.

Throughout the 19th century up to the 1880s, Ashkenazi Jews from Eastern Europe as well as groups of Sephardi Jews from Turkey, Bulgaria, and North Africa immigrated to Palestine. Jerusalem's Jewish population grew particularly fast as a result of Jewish migration from within the Land of Israel and abroad. In the aftermath of the Galilee earthquake of 1837, some Jewish residents of Safed and Tiberias, which had been hit hard by the earthquake, further expanded the population. As a result, the Jewish Quarter became overcrowded and squalid and Jews who moved to other parts of the city paid exorbitant rents to non-Jewish landlords. The Rothschild family attempted to ease the overcrowding by financing a set of apartments for Jews called the Batei Hamahse in the 1850s, but this proved inadequate. With the expansion of Jerusalem beyond the traditional Old City walls, Jews began settling outside of the Old City. In 1855, the Kerem Avraham district, which contained a vineyard and soap factory, was founded by James Finn, the British Consul in Jerusalem, to provide the Jews of Jerusalem employment so they would not have to subsist on donations from abroad. The first Jewish neighborhood built outside of the Old City walls was Mishkenot Sha'ananim, established in 1860. Mahane Israel, the second Jewish neighborhood built outside the Old City walls, was founded in 1867 as a settlement for Maghrebi Jews. The third Jewish neighborhood built outside the Old City was Nahalat Shiv'a, which was founded in 1869 as a cooperative effort by seven families who pooled their funds to purchase the land and build homes. In 1875, the Jewish neighborhood of Kirya Ne'emana and the first of the Jewish neighborhoods that would make up the Nachlaot district were founded. Jewish settlement activities also began to take place outside Jerusalem in the 1870s. In 1870, Mikveh Israel was established as a Jewish agricultural school and the first new Jewish settlement in Palestine in modern times. In 1878, Jews from Safed founded the village of Gei Oni, later Rosh Pinna, and religious Jewish pioneers who had immigrated from Europe founded the settlement of Petah Tikva. The Jewish population of Haifa was also bolstered by immigration from Morocco and Turkey in the 1870s.

In 1880, the Jewish population of Palestine numbered around 20,000 to 25,000, of whom two-thirds lived in Jerusalem. The Jewish population, known as the Old Yishuv, was divided into two predominant clusters. The oldest group consisted of the Ladino-speaking Sephardic Jewish communities which had been established in the late Mamluk and early Ottoman periods and the Arabic-speaking communities who had already been living there since before the coming of Islam and had been culturally and linguistically Arabized. The Sephardic community traced its origins to not only Sephardim who settled in Palestine, but local Arabized Jews who had intermarried into the Sephardic community and Mizrahi Jews who had migrated from other parts of the Middle East and integrated into the Sephardic community. The second group was the Ashkenazi community, composed of primarily Haredi Jews who had migrated from Europe to settle in Palestine in the 18th and 19th centuries.

In the late 19th and early 20th centuries, tens of thousands of Jewish immigrants began arriving in Palestine and establishing new Jewish settlements. These immigrants were largely motivated by nationalism and a desire to live in the land of their ancestors as Zionism, or support for founding a new Jewish state, emerged. The first major such wave was the First Aliyah, which took place between 1881 and 1903. About 25,000 to 35,000 Jews immigrated to Palestine, mostly from Eastern Europe and Yemen, though about half subsequently left. About 28 significant Jewish settlements were established, and about 90,000 acres of land were purchased by Jews. During this period, the revival of the Hebrew language in Palestine began. A Hebrew school system was established and new words were coined to make Hebrew more practical for modern use. The effort was largely spearheaded by Eliezer Ben-Yehuda. As a result, Hebrew became an everyday spoken language again and gradually became the primary language of the Jewish population of Palestine. The Second Aliyah took place from 1904 to 1914 and saw around 35,000 Jews immigrate to Palestine. The majority of the Jewish immigrants came from the Russian Empire, though some also came from Yemen. Further Jewish settlements were established and in 1909, Tel Aviv was founded as the first modern Jewish city. The growth of the Jewish community of Palestine, which was known as the Yishuv, was disrupted by the outbreak of World War I in 1914. During the war, many Jews were expelled from Palestine by the Ottoman authorities as enemy nationals, since they had immigrated from countries now at war with the Ottoman Empire. In 1917, the Ottoman authorities carried out the Tel Aviv and Jaffa deportation, expelling the entire Jewish civilian populations of Tel Aviv and Jaffa. Many deportees subsequently died from hunger and disease.

=== British Mandate (1917–1948) ===
The UN partition plan

In 1917, towards the end of World War I, following the defeat of the Ottoman Empire, Palestine was occupied by British forces. The United Kingdom was granted control of the area west of the River Jordan now comprising the State of Israel, the West Bank and the Gaza Strip (Mandatory Palestine), and on the east bank of what later became Jordan (as a separate mandate) by the Versailles Peace Conference which established the League of Nations in 1919. Herbert Samuel, a former Postmaster General in the British cabinet, who was instrumental in drafting the Balfour Declaration was appointed the first High Commissioner of Mandatory Palestine, generally simply known as Palestine. During World War I the British had made two promises regarding territory in the Middle East. Britain had promised the local Arabs, through Lawrence of Arabia, independence for a united Arab country covering most of the Arab Middle East, in exchange for their supporting the British; and Britain had promised to create and foster a Jewish national home as laid out in the Balfour Declaration, 1917. The British view, expressed by under secretary for foreign affairs, Robert Cecil: Arabian countries should be for Arabs, Armenia for Armenians, Judea for the Jews.

With the British conquest, Jews who had been expelled by the Ottomans were able to return, and Jewish immigration picked up again. The Third Aliyah saw about 40,000 Jewish immigrants arrive in Palestine from 1919 to the start of an economic crisis in Palestine in 1923, and between 1924 and 1928, the Fourth Aliyah saw about 80,000 more Jewish immigrants arrive in Palestine and the Fifth Aliyah, which took place between 1929 and 1939, saw the arrival of an estimated 225,000 to 300,000 Jewish immigrants. During this time, land continued to be purchased by Jews, many new Jewish settlements were established and existing Jewish communities in urban areas continued to grow. Tel Aviv in particular saw large-scale development and became a major city. It was home to over a third of the Jewish population by 1939. During this time, tensions with the Arabs increased over Jewish immigration. The 1921 Jaffa riots and 1929 Palestine riots saw Arab mobs violently attack Jewish population centers, and the tensions culminated in the 1936-1939 Arab revolt in Palestine, which saw the Arabs launch widespread attacks against both Jews and the British.

In 1947, there were approximately 630,000 Jews living alongside approximately 1.2 million Arabs in Palestine. Following increasing levels of violence, the British government expressed a wish to withdraw from Palestine that year. The proposed plan of partition would have split Palestine into two states, an Arab state and a Jewish state, and the City of Jerusalem, giving slightly more than half the land area to the proposed Jewish state. Immediately following the adoption by the United Nations General Assembly of a resolution recommending the adoption and implementation of the Partition Plan (Resolution 181(II) ), and its subsequent acceptance by the Jewish leadership civil war broke out between the Arab community and the Jewish community, as armies of the Arab League, which rejected the Partition Plan which Israel accepted, sought to squelch the new Jewish state.

On 14 May 1948, one day before the end of the British Mandate, the leaders of the Jewish community in Palestine led by the future prime minister David Ben-Gurion, declared the establishment of a Jewish state in Eretz-Israel, to be known as the State of Israel.

=== State of Israel (1948–present) ===
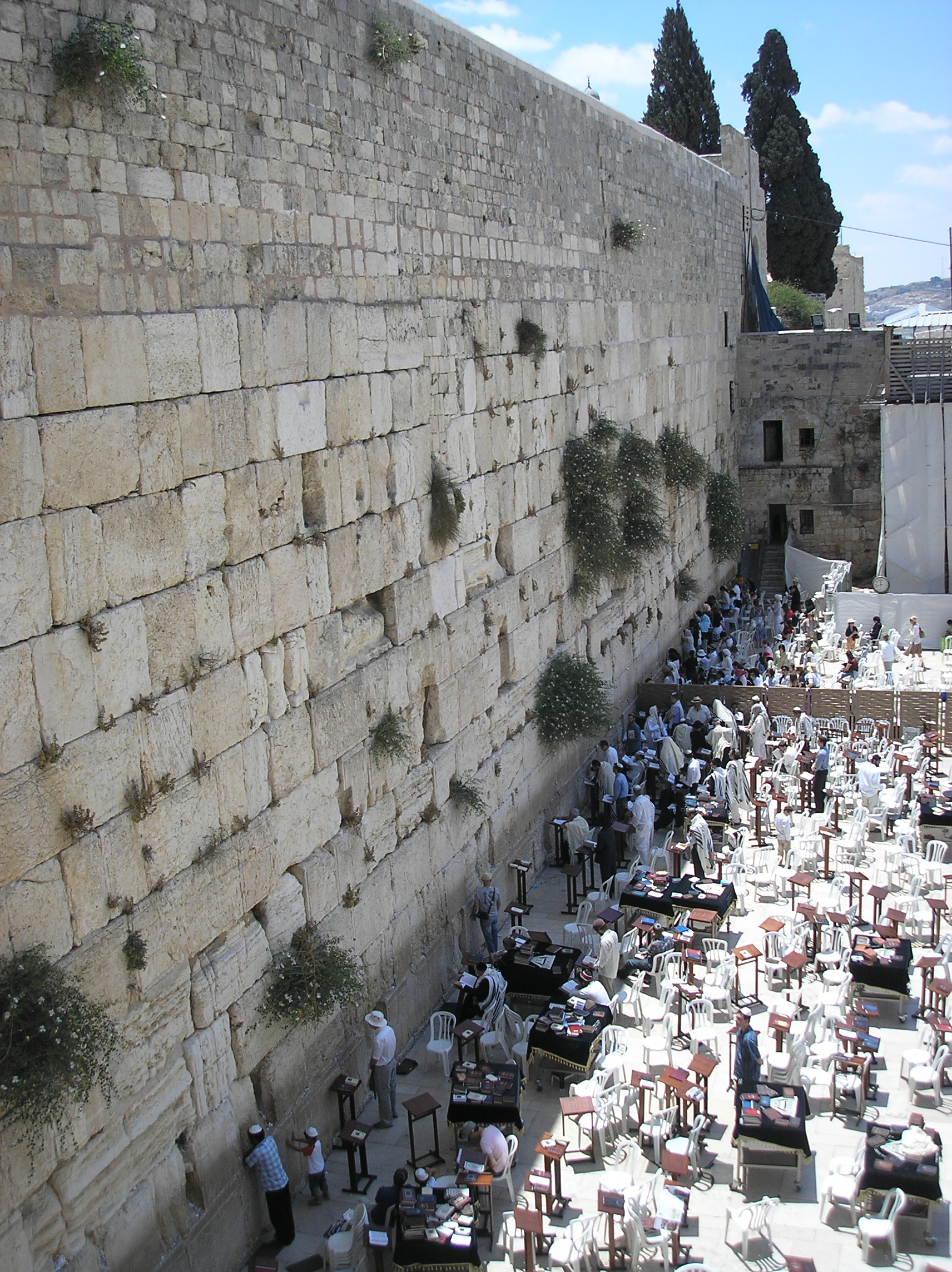
Western Wall in Jerusalem

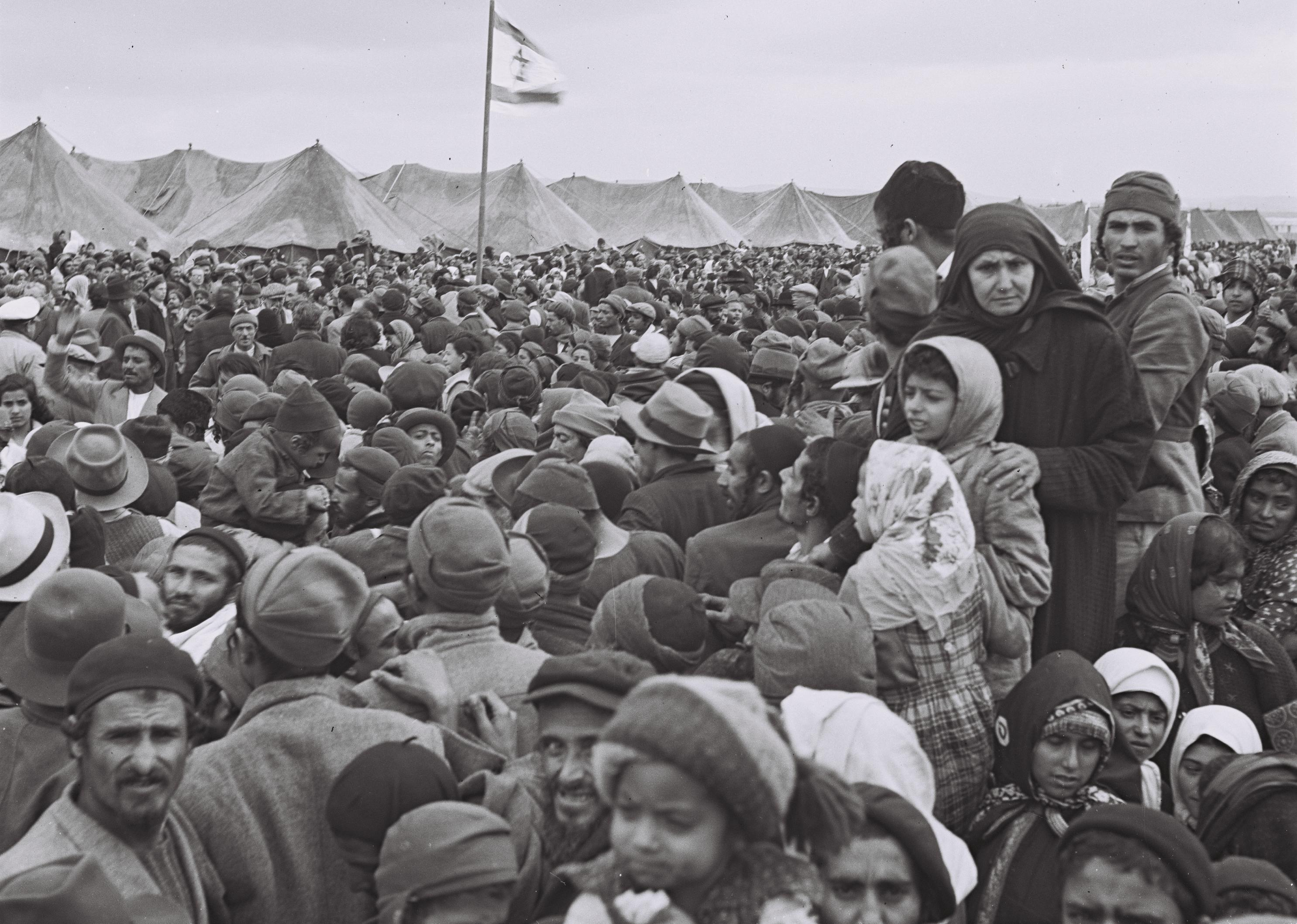
Yemenite Jews in Ma'abarat (Absorption Camp) Rosh Ha-Ayin in 1950

The armies of Egypt, Lebanon, Syria, Jordan, and Iraq marched into the territory of what had just ceased to be the British Mandate, thus starting the 1948 Arab–Israeli War. The nascent Israel Defense Forces repulsed the Arab armies, and extended Israel's borders beyond the original Resolution 181(II) boundaries for the proposed Jewish state. By December 1948, Israel controlled most of the portion of Mandate Palestine west of the Jordan River. The remainder of the Mandate came to be called the West Bank (controlled by Jordan), and the Gaza Strip (controlled by Egypt). Prior to and during this conflict, 711,000 Palestinians Arabs were expelled or fled their homes to become Palestinian refugees. One third went to the West Bank and one third to the Gaza Strip, occupied by Jordan and Egypt respectively, and the rest to Jordan, Syria, Lebanon and other countries.

After the establishment of Israel, immigration of Holocaust survivors from Europe and a large influx of Jewish refugees from Arab countries had doubled Israel's population within one year of its independence. Overall, during the following years approximately 850,000 Sephardi and Mizrahi Jews fled or were expelled from Arab countries, Iran and Afghanistan. Of these, about 680,000 settled in Israel.

Israel's Jewish population continued to grow at a very high rate for years, fed by waves of Jewish immigration from round the world, including the massive immigration wave of Soviet Jews, who arrived in Israel in the early 1990s, according to the Law of Return. Some 380,000 Jewish immigrants from the Soviet Union arrived in 1990–91 alone.

Since 1948, Israel has been involved in a series of major military conflicts, including the 1956 Suez Crisis, 1967 Six-Day War, 1973 Yom Kippur War, 1982 Lebanon War, and 2006 Lebanon War, as well as a nearly constant series of other conflicts, among them the ongoing Israeli–Palestinian conflict. Throughout the 1980s and the 1990s there were numerous liberalization measures: in monetary policy, in domestic capital markets, and in various instruments of governmental interference in economic activity. The role of government in the economy was considerably decreased. On the other hand, some governmental economic functions were increased: a national health insurance system was introduced, though private health providers continued to provide health services within the national system. Social welfare payments, such as unemployment benefits, child allowances, old age pensions and minimum income support, were expanded continuously, until they formed a major budgetary expenditure. These transfer payments compensated, to a large extent, for the continuous growth of income inequality, which had moved Israel from among the developed countries with the least income inequality to those with the most.

== See also ==
- Demographic history of Palestine (region)
  - Timeline of the demographics of Palestine (region)
- Israeli Jews (Palestinian Jews)
- Jewish history
- List of Jewish leaders in the Land of Israel
- List of Yeshivas and Midrashas in Israel
- Muslim history in Palestine (Islamization)
- Time periods in the Palestine region
