= Isaac Akrish =

Manuscript collector and editor

Isaac ben Abraham Akrish (Hebrew: יִצְחַק בֵּן אַבְרָהָם עַקְרִישׁ; c. 1530 – after 1578) was a Sephardi Jewish scholar, bibliophile, and editor.

== Biography ==
Isaac ben Abraham Akrish was born in Salonika, the son of exiles from Spain who settled there in 1495 after briefly living in Naples.

Though lame in both legs, Akrish travelled extensively throughout his life. His primary interest was in manuscripts which he attempted to save from destruction. The course of his tiresome travels at length brought him to Cairo, Egypt. There he was taken into the house of the Radbaz (David ibn Abi Zimra), an immigrant who had attained to a high communal position. An avid bibliophile, Akrish spent his money on scribes whom he hired to copy the Radbaz's manuscripts, amassing a large collection of documents.

Akrish remained at Cairo as private tutor to the Radbaz's children and grandchildren for about ten years (about 1543–1553), until his patron's emigration to the Land of Israel. Akrish then left for Constantinople, stopping in Candia. There, his books were confiscated by the Venetian government in the wake of the recent decree by Pope Julius III to burn the Talmud. After successfully regaining his collection, he settled in Constantinople where Esther Handali and Joseph Nasi supported his efforts to amass manuscripts. Most of his books were destroyed in a catastrophic fire in 1569 which devoured almost the whole Jewish quarter; he left Constantinople for Kastoria where he lived in poverty for the rest of his life.

== Work ==
In his later life Akrish edited a series of books and documents he had collected during his travels. In about 1577 he published a collection of ten documents (afterward called Kobetz Vikkuḥim), containing notably the satirical letter addressed by Profiat Duran to his former friend David En-Bonet, Al Tehi ka-Avotekha ('Be Not Like Thy Fathers'). The same volume contained, also, the proselyting epistle of the apostate Astruc Remoch to his young friend En-Shaltiel Bonfas, the satirical reply to it by Solomon Bonfed, a polemical letter of Shem-Tov ibn Falaquera, and Kunteres Ḥibbut ha-Kever by Akrish himself.

He also edited a second collection of documents, largely of a historical character. The first part bore the title Ma'aseh Beit David, and contained the history of Bostanai; the second, that of Kol Mebasser, comprising a correspondence between Hasdai ibn Shaprut and the king of the Khazars that he had recovered in his travels; and the letter of Elijah of Ferrara. In addition to other works, Akrish is said to have edited a triple commentary upon the Song of Songs along with a few other Hebrew polemical works.
