= Astruc Remoch =

14th-century Jewish convert to Catholicism

Astruc Remoch (sometimes spelled Raimuch) was a Jewish convert to Catholicism who made his mark in history by attempting the conversion of other Jews during the 14th century.

Remoch was a medical doctor in Fraga, Spain, in the 14th century. He had contact with prominent Jews of his day, such as Benveniste ibn Labi of Zaragoza.

In 1391, Astruc Remoch was baptized into the Roman Catholic Church, taking the name Francisco Dias-Carni. Following his conversion, Remoch's belief in the Catholic doctrine of Extra Ecclesiam Nulla Salus was so strong that he endangered his old Jewish friend En-Shealtiel Bonfos (probably a son of the physician Isaac Bonfos born Shealtiel of Falces), in his efforts to get Bonfos to convert as well.

Remoch (Francisco) wrote a letter to his friend in Hebrew, critical of Judaism and supportive of the beliefs of Christianity. In response, Remoch received two letters. Bonfos composed a careful response to what was a very delicate topic during the Inquisition, avoiding any statements that the Church might find offensive.

The satirical poet Solomon ben Reuben Bonfed wrote his own much less careful reply to Remoch's arguments in a rhyming prose that attacked each of Remoch's arguments.

Solomon first apologizes for his interference in matters that are none of his business, then insists that as a Jew he cannot remain silent amidst the argument, and continues to argue that the Christian belief system was unsupportable, stating, "You twist and distort the Bible text to establish the Trinity."

== Sources ==
- JewishEncyclopedia.com - RAIMUCH (REMOCH), ASTRUC
- POLEMICS AND POLEMICAL LITERATURE (Jewish Encyclopedia) - BibleWiki
