= Elijah of Ferrara =

15th-century Talmudist and traveller

Elijah of Ferrara (Hebrew: אליהו מפררה, or אליהו מפרארה) was a Jewish-Italian Talmudist and traveler of the earlier part of the 15th century. He was engaged in 1437 as lecturer and teacher in Jerusalem, where he arrived after a stormy voyage, during which he lost his son and grandson. He wrote several letters to his wife and children, whom he had left behind in Ferrara; only one of these epistles, dated 1438, has been preserved. This "Iggeret," written in rhymed prose, has been published in the collection "Dibre Ḥakamim," Metz, 1853, and translated by Carmoly ("Itinéeraires," pp. 331–337) under the title "Ahabat Ẓiyyon." In this he gives a description of Jerusalem, recounts the legends current about the "children of Israel," the Ten Tribes, and the Sambation River, and states his intention to visit other parts of The Land of Israel and to send a description of what he sees there. A fragment of another letter has survived, published by Isaac Akrish in his "Ḳol Mebasser" (Constantinople, 1577). From remarks contained in the latter in reference to medical practise in Jerusalem it may be inferred that Elijah was also a physician. Elijah's depictions are also included in Judah David Eisenstein's collection "Otsar Masa'ot" (1927).

== Bibliography ==
Steinschneider, Cat. Bodl. col. 929;
Luncz, Jerusalem, iii. 48;
Munk, Palestine, p. 643;
Carmoly, Itinéraires, pp. 329–337;
Grätz, Gesch. 2d ed., viii. 277.
