= Joseph Saragossi =

Spanish-born rabbi and kabbalist (1460–1507)

Joseph Saragossi יוסף סרגוסי
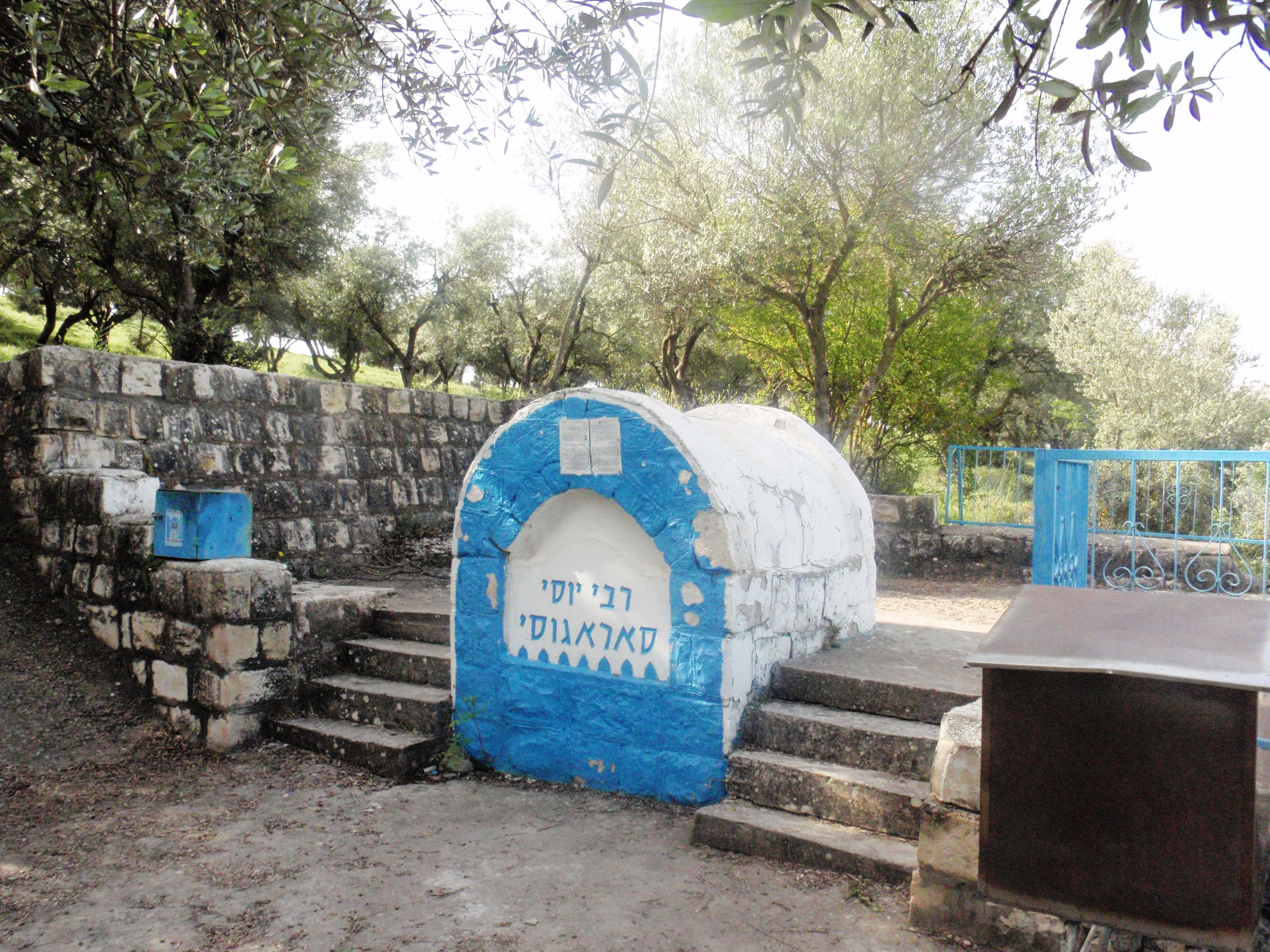
- Tomb of Saragossi, Ein Zeitim, Israel. According to legend a Jewish community was saved after praying at this tomb. The ruler of the time was demanding 500 white chickens.

Personal life
- Born: 1460
- Died: 1507 (aged 46–47)

Religious life
- Religion: Judaism

Joseph Saragossi, (Hebrew: יוסף סרגוסי; 1460 – 1507) was a Spanish-born rabbi and kabbalist of the 15th and 16th centuries. He is credited with developing Safed into an important Jewish and kabbalistic centre. Due to a legend he is known as Tzaddik ha-Lavan (White Saint) or Tzaddik ha-Tarnegolim (Cockerel Saint.)

== Biography ==
Although Saragossi was born in 15th-century Spain, it is possible that his family did not originate in the Spanish town of Zaragoza, as his name implies, but rather Saragossa (Syracuse) in Sicily. He was banished with the rest of the Jewish community in 1492 and travelled through Sicily to Beirut and Sidon. He settled in Safed, where he became a rabbi. There were about 300 Jews there who had originally come from the Berbers, Sephardim and Moriscos, but they had no natural leader.

Saragossi became a rabbi and a leader of the Jewish people despite his quiet manner. His charismatic personality was used to foster the growth of peace and harmony within the community. He endeavored to show reconciliation and mutual respect towards Safed's Muslim and Arab inhabitants. Saragossi's influence in Safed has been compared to the Italian Obadyah di Bertinoro who made a similar contribution to the community in Jerusalem.

When Saragossi indicated his intention to leave Safed, the people of Safed persuaded him to remain, offering to pay him an annual retainer. The respect of the Arab community was demonstrated when their Muslim governor promised to provide 33 of the 50 ducats that was offered to Saragossi as an annual payment. Combining Talmudic with kabbalistic knowledge, Saragossi created a movement interested in Kabbalistic Jewish study in Safed. His kabbalistic teachings attracted the attention of David ibn Abu Zimra.

In accordance with his wish, Saragossi was buried adjacent to the tomb of Judah bar Ilai, the site where he experienced a revelation of the prophet Elijah. The object of a legend in which a salvation was wrought at his graveside involving the procurement of 500 pure white chickens, he was thereafter called the Tzaddik ha-Lavan (White Saint) or the Tzaddik ha-Tarnegolim (Cockrel Saint.) A similar story is told of the tanna Abba Yosef haBanai.

At the turn of the 19th-century, Saragossi's tomb at 'Ain Zaitun was the object of a weekly pilgrimage from the morning after Passover (22nd Nisan) until the 18th Iyyar.
