= David ben Solomon ibn Abi Zimra =

Spanish-born rabbi (1479–1573)

David ben Solomon ibn Abi Zimra דָּוִד בֶּן שְׁלֹמֹה אִבְּן אָבִי זִמְרָא

Personal life
- Born: 1479 Spain
- Died: 1573 (aged 93–94) Safed, Ottoman Empire
- Buried: Safed Old Jewish Cemetery

Religious life
- Religion: Judaism
- Semikhah: Joseph Saragossi

David ben Solomon ibn (Abi) Zimra (Hebrew: ר׳ דָּוִד בֶּן שְׁלֹמֹה אִבְּן אָבִי זִמְרָא) (1479–1573)—also called the Radbaz (רַדְבָּ״ז) after the initials of his name, Rabbi David ben Zimra—was an early acharon of the fifteenth and sixteenth centuries who was a leading posek, rosh yeshiva, chief rabbi, and author of more than 3,000 responsa (halakhic decisions) as well as several scholarly works.

== Biography ==
The Radbaz was born in Spain around 1479. He was thirteen years of age when his family, like all Spanish Jews, were banished from Spain. His parents settled in Safed, Mamluk Sultanate, where he studied under the direction of Joseph Saragossi.

For unknown reasons, he left the Land of Israel aged 31 or 32 and traveled to Wattasinid Fez, where he became a member of the beth din (rabbinical court) presided over by the nagid Isaac Sholal.

In 1517, upon the abolition of the office of nagid by the Turkish government, the Radbaz moved to Cairo. There he was appointed Hakham Bashi, or Chief Rabbi of Egypt, a title he held for forty years. He was highly revered for his vast knowledge, integrity of character, and extensive philanthropy. Independently wealthy, the Radbaz was a successful merchant with business connections in other countries. The yeshiva which he founded and supported attracted many distinguished students, among them Bezalel Ashkenazi and Isaac Luria.

In the introduction to his commentary on Song of Songs, Isaac Akrish paints in vivid colors the character of the Radbaz, in whose house he lived for ten years. According to Akrish, the Radbaz was prominent in both the social and the political life of Egypt thanks to his status as a wealthy intellectual. During the time he served as Chief Rabbi, he introduced many reforms to the everyday life and religion of the Egyptian Jews. It was he who abolished the use of the Seleucid dating system in the Egyptian Jewish community and reintroduced the dating of years from Creation, as was done in other Jewish communities and continues to be done until the present day.

Upon attaining the age of 90, the Radbaz resigned the chief rabbinate and divided the greater part of his fortune among the poor, making special provision for Torah scholars. He then moved to Jerusalem. But he did not stay there long, due to the burdensome taxes that the Ottoman Empire had imposed upon Jews. He settled in Safed, capital of the Safad Sanjak, where he became an active member of the rabbinical court presided over by Joseph Karo, who held him in great esteem. He spent the last 20 years of his life in peace, continuing his learning and writing.

The Radbaz died in Safed in 1573 at the age of 94, and was buried in the Safed Old Jewish Cemetery.

== Works ==
- Divrei David ("Words of David") – containing decisions and chiddushim (original Torah thoughts) on Maimonides' Mishneh Torah, published by Joseph Zamiro, together with his own work, Hon Yosef ("Wealth of Joseph"), Livorno, 1828.
- Yekar Tiferet ("Honor of Excellency") – containing answers to the criticisms of Abraham ben David on Maimonides' Mishneh Torah and commentaries on those passages in that work which the Maggid Mishneh of Vidal of Tolosa overlooks; of these commentaries, the portions on Hafla'ah and Zera'im were published in Smyrna in 1757, and the remaining portions in the Vilna edition of the Mishneh Torah, 1890.
- Kelalei ha-Gemara ("Rules of the Gemara") – a methodology of the Talmud, published in the collection Me-Harere Nemarim of Abraham ben Solomon Akra, Venice, 1599.
- Ohr Kadmon ("Pristine Light") – a Kabbalistic work, edited by Moses Hagiz, Venice, 1713.
- Magen David ("Shield of David") – a mystical explanation of the Hebrew alphabet opposing Recanati and Rabbi Judah Ḥayyaṭ, edited by Chagis, Amsterdam, 1713.
- Metzudat David ("The Bulwark of David") – revealing reasons for the 613 commandments according to the four methods of explanation known as the "Pardes system" (Zolkiev, 1862).
- Michtam le-David ("David's Poem") – Kabbalistic homilies on the Song of Songs, still extant in manuscript.
- Keter Malkut ("Crown of Royalty") – prayers for Yom Kippur, first published with the above-mentioned Ohr Kadmon, reprinted in the Shevet Musar of Elijah ben Abraham Solomon ha-Kohen of Smyrna, and finally inserted by Heidenheim in the ritual for the eve of Yom Kippur.
- Gilui le-Idrot – a commentary on the Idrot with notes by Rabbi Chaim Vital, still extant in manuscript in the Abarbanel Library in Jerusalem.
- Dinei Rabba ve-Zuta ("The Great and Small Decisions") – a commentary on the Shulkhan Arukh.
- Shivim Panim la-Torah ("Seventy Faces to the Torah") – the latter two works are mentioned in the preface of Magen David.

The Radbaz's responsa are his greatest contribution to Jewish literature; parts of it were published in Livorno, 1651 (Nos. 1–300); Venice, 1799 (Nos. 1–318); Fürth, 1781 (Nos. 400–649); Livorno, 1818 (Nos. 2051–2341). A complete edition of the responsa was published in Sudzilkow, 1836.

- Questions & Responsa (a collection of responsa written by Rabbi David ibn Abi Zimra, published in 2 vols., in seven parts) (Venice, 1749), reprinted in Israel, n.d.

== Bibliography ==
- Israel M. Goldman, The Life and Times of Rabbi David Ibn Abi Zimra: A Social, Economic, and Cultural Study of Jewish Life in the Ottoman Empire in the 15th and 16th Centuries as Reflected in the Responsa of the RDBZ, New York, The Jewish Theological Seminary of America, 1970.
