= Solomon ben Reuben Bonfed =

Solomon ben Reuben Bonfed (late 14th-century-early 15th century) was a Spanish rabbi and poet who lived in Zaragoza.

Bonafed was a member of the group of Hebrew poets in Spain known as the ‘Adat Nognim or "Band of Minstrels" along with Solomon Dapiera, Vidal (Joseph) ben Lavi, Vidal Benveniste. He was the youngest member.

His diwan, still extant in manuscript (Adolf Neubauer, "Cat. Bodl. Hebr. MSS." No. 1984), is notable, as well as for the historical information contained in it.

Bonfed was present at the controversy of Tortosa (1413–14); and many of his poems are addressed to those who took part in it.

The diwan contains also an answer, in rimed prose, to a letter of the converted Jew, Astruc Raimuch of Fraga, in which the neophyte enthusiastically propounds the dogmas of Christianity, and endeavors to demonstrate the Trinity, original sin, and redemption, from the Bible. Apologizing for discussing the contents of a letter not addressed to him, Bonfed minutely examines the Christian dogmas, and proceeds to argue how irrational and untenable they are. He says: "You twist and distort the Bible text to establish the Trinity. Had you a quaternity to prove, you would demonstrate it quite as strikingly and convincingly from the Old Testament."
