= List of Israeli Ethiopian Jews =

Lists of Israelis

By ethnicity
Israeli Jews:
Ethiopian Jews

Arab citizens of Israel:
Arab Muslims, Druze, Arab Christians

Various:
Circassians
By descent
Afghan, Algerian, American, Argentine, Armenian, Australian, Austrian

Belarusian, Belgian, Bosnian, Brazilian, British, Bulgarian

Canadian, Chilean, Chinese, Croatian, Czech

Danish, Dutch

Egyptian, Estonian, Ethiopian

Finnish, French

Georgian, German, Greek, Guatemalan

Hungarian

Indian, Iranian, Iraqi, Irish, Italian

Kazakhstani

Latvian, Libyan, Lithuanian

Mexican, Moldovan, Moroccan, Nigerian

Polish

Romanian, Russian

Serbian, Slovak, South African, Sudanese, Swedish, Swiss, Syrian

Tunisian, Turkish

Ukrainian, Uzbekistani

Yemeni
By place of residence

This is a list of notable Israeli Ethiopian Jews, including both original immigrants who obtained Israeli citizenship and their Israeli descendants.

Although traditionally, the term "Ethiopian Jews" was used as an all-encompassing term referring to the Jews descended from the Jewish communities of Ethiopia, due to the melting pot effect of Israeli society, the term "Ethiopian Jews" has gradually become more vague as many of the Israeli descendants of Beta Israel immigrants adopt the characteristics of Israeli culture and intermarry with descendants of other Jewish communities.

This list is ordered by category of human endeavor. Persons with significant contributions in two fields are listed in both of the pertinent categories, to facilitate easy look-up.

== Religious figures ==
=== Priests ===
- Liqa Kahenat Berhan Baruch (Abba Uri; 1898–1984) – the main leader of Beta Israel from the Italian occupation until his death.
- Liqa Kahenat Raphael Hadane (born 12 August 1923 – 2020) – the priest of the Jews in Dembiya.
- Liqa Kahenat Isaac Yaso (1892–1997) – the priest of the Jews in Tigray.
- Liqa Kahenat Menashe Zemro (1905–1998) – the priest of the Jews in Wegera.

=== Rabbis ===
- Rabbi Yosef Hadane – the Ethiopian Chief Rabbi.
- Rabbi Sharon Shalom – lecturer in Jewish ritual and tradition at Bar Ilan University in Israel. Is the rabbi of Ashkenazi synagogue in the town of Kiryat Gat.
- Rabbi Yefet Alemu (born 1961) – In 1980, he left his small village in Ethiopia to go to Israel. He was arrested in Addis Ababa and escaped from prison. He arrived in the Gondar region and then set out walking to Sudan. There he met a Jewish Red Cross director who arranged for him to fly on one of the Israeli-organized secret flights to Israel. In Israel he studied and became a nurse. He was accepted by the Schechter Institute and after 6 years of hard work, he received a BA, MA, and his rabbinical ordination.

== Athletes ==
=== Association football ===
- Shai Biruk (born 15 February 1984) – soccer player.
- Ziv Caveda (born 10 December 1978) – soccer player.
- Eli Dasa (born 3 December 1992) – soccer player.
- The brothers Baruch (born 26 March 1981) and Messay Dego (born 15 February 1986) – both are Israeli soccer players.
- Imaye Taga (born 1 February 1985) – soccer player.
- Yehiel Tzagai (born 27 January 1983) – soccer player.
- Kfir Zokol (born 31 July 1982) – soccer player.

=== Runners ===
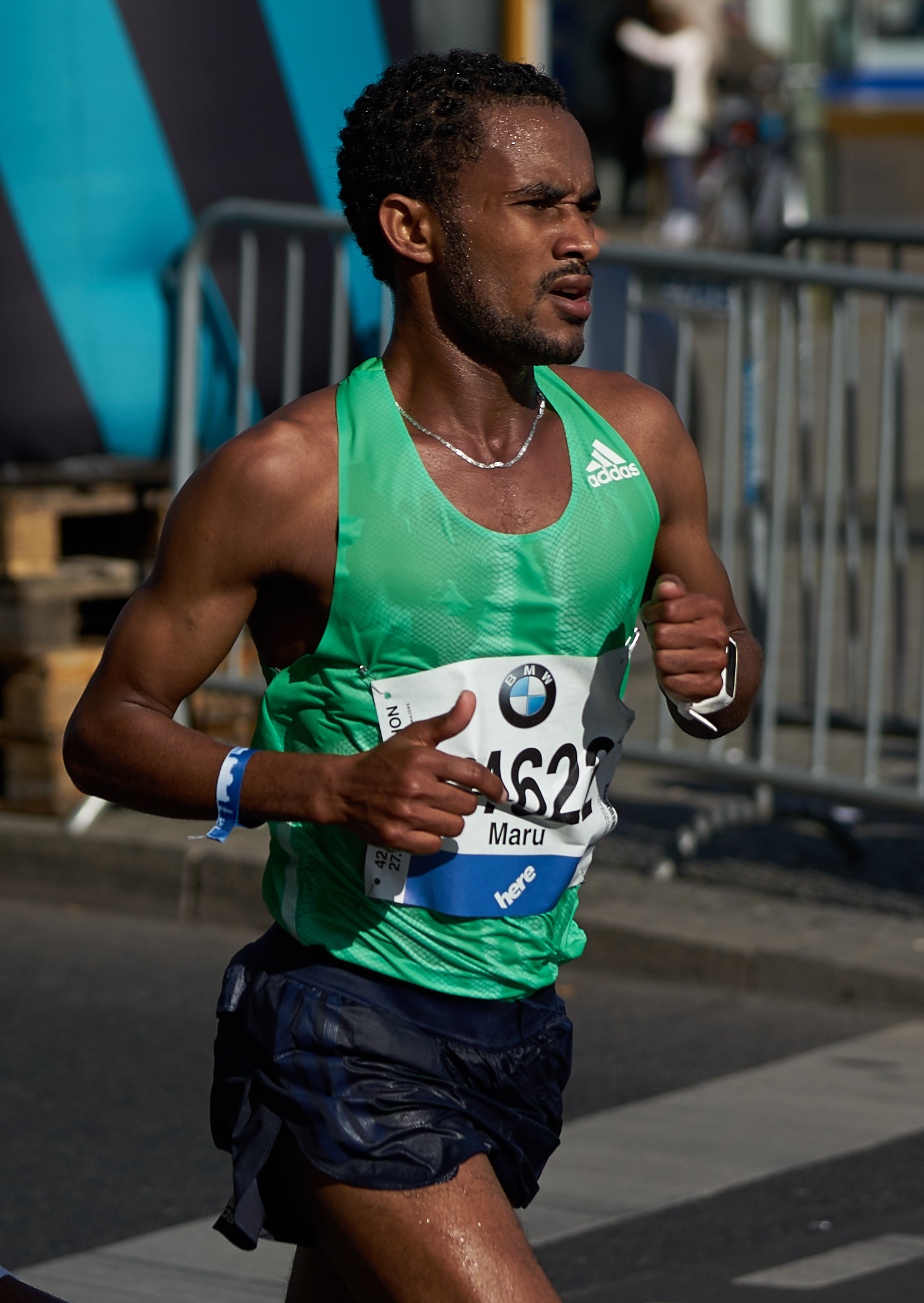
Maru Teferi

- Ayele Seteng (born 11 April 1955) – marathon runner
- Asaf Bimro (born 1 January 1969) – marathon runner
- Ageze Guadie (born 1989) – Olympic marathon runner
- Asher Iyasu – golfer
- Maru Teferi (born 1992) – Olympic marathon runner
- Zohar Zimro (born 1977) – Olympic marathon runner
- Wodage Zvadya (born 7 September 1973) – marathon runner

== Politicians and activists ==
=== Knesset members ===
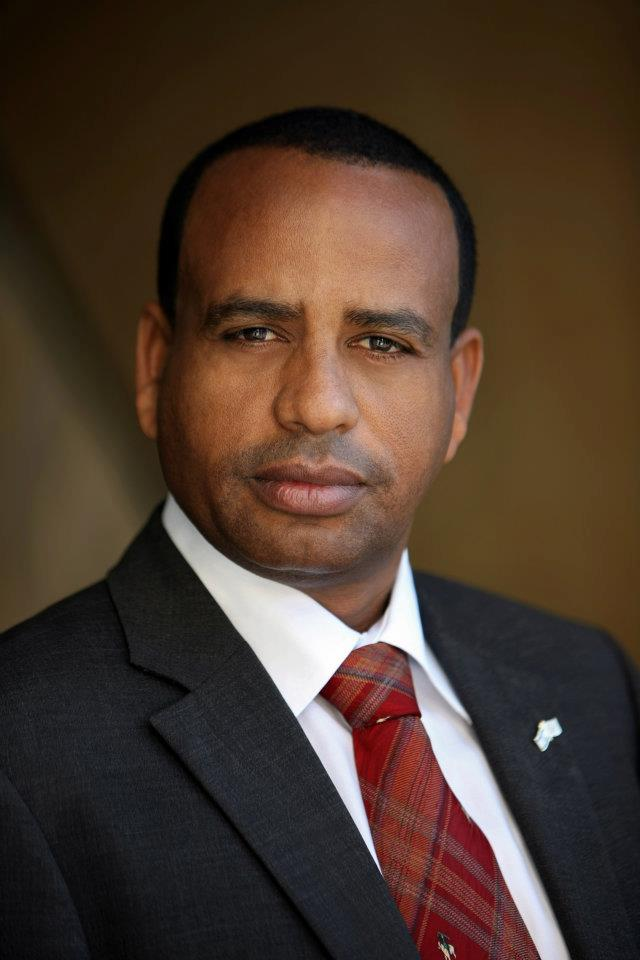
Shlomo Molla, former member of the Knesset for the Kadima party.

- Adisu Massala (born 16 June 1961) – former Israeli politician of the Labour party and later One Nation. Massala was the first Ethiopian-Israeli to serve in the Knesset.
- Shlomo Molla (born 21 November 1965) – Israeli politician and former member of the Knesset for the Kadima party.
- Rabbi Mazor Bahaina (born 12 September 1973) – from Beersheba, studied at Yeshivat Porat Yosef, one of the most prestigious Sephardi yeshivot in Israel. Bahaina is a member of the Shas party and a former knesset member.
- Alali Adamso (born 1963) – Israeli politician and former member of the Knesset for the Likud party.
- Pnina Tamano-Shata (born 1977) – first Israeli Government Minister of Ethiopian descent. A lawyer, Israeli politician and former member of the Knesset for the Yesh Atid. Former journalist in Channel 1 and the first Ethiopian-Israeli presenter.
- Shimon Solomon (born 1968) – Israeli politician and former member of the Knesset for Yesh Atid
- Avraham Neguise – one of Israel's most prominent Ethiopian Activists and a member of the South Wing to Zion. His struggle, with the support of many other Ethiopian-Israelis has resulted in the Israeli government continuing to bring the last 23,000 Ethiopian Jews from Ethiopia; though the Israeli government has set a quota of 300 Jews per month, half of what they agreed to under pressure from Neguise, NACOEJ and the United Jewish Communities. He is a member of the Knesset for the Likud party.
- Gadi Yavarkan – activist, publicist and political figure in the Likud party.

== Other politicians and activists ==
- Ferede Aklum (1949–2009) – Aliyah activist.
- Yona Bogale (1908–1987) – educator and Aliyah activist.
- Taamrat Emmanuel (1888–1963) – intellectual.
- Tsega Melaku – politician, author, journalist, community activist and former director of Kol Yisrael's Reshet Alef ("Network A")
- Mazi Melesa Pilip (born 1978/1979) – legislator in New York's Nassau County Legislature
- Baruch Tegegne (1944–2010) – protégé of Bogale, leader in protests on behalf of Ethiopian Jewry in the 1980s and 1990s.
- Daniel Uria – political figure in the Kadima party and activist.

== Military officers ==
- Issachar Makonnen – became the first Ethiopian-Israeli officer in the rank of lieutenant colonel (Hebrew: סגן-אלוף).
- Tzion Shenkor – Ethiopian-Israeli officer in the Israel Defense Forces in 2009 when he was promoted to the rank of lieutenant colonel (Hebrew: סגן-אלוף) and became the first IDF battalion commander of Ethiopian descent.
- Avraham Yitzhak – first Israeli-Ethiopian physician and a major (Hebrew: רב סרן) in the IDF.
- Hadas Malada-Mitzri – first lieutenant (Hebrew: סגן) in the IDF. The first woman from the Ethiopian community to serve as a physician.

== Cultural figures ==
=== Actors ===
- Meskie Shibru-Sivan (born 29 September 1967) – an Israeli actress and vocalist, well known in Israel and beyond for acting on theater stages, in television programs, movies as well as being an accomplished singer.
- Tehila Yeshayahu-Adgeh – a theatre actress and playwright.
- Shmuel Beru (born 15 October 1975) – Israeli actor, comedian and film director.
- Shai Fredo (22 July 1975) – Israeli actor.
- Yossi Wasa – Israeli actor, comedian and playwright.
- Ester Rada (born 1985) – Israeli actress and singer.
- Sirak M. Sabahat (born 5 December 1981) – actor.
- Tomer A. Benadam – comedian, satirist and entertainer.
- Esti Almo Wexler – film director, writer, and cinematographer.

=== Musicians ===
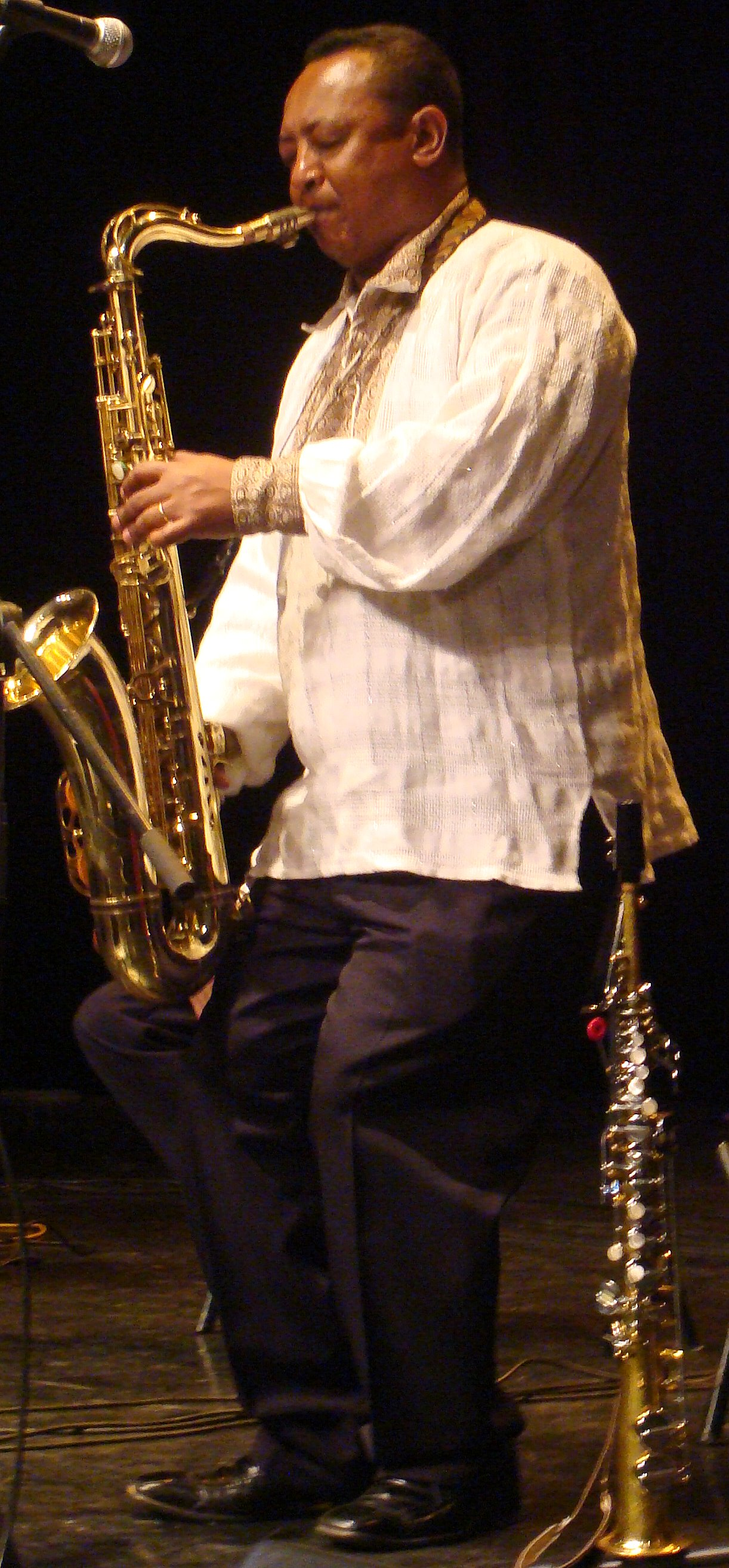
Abatte Barihun

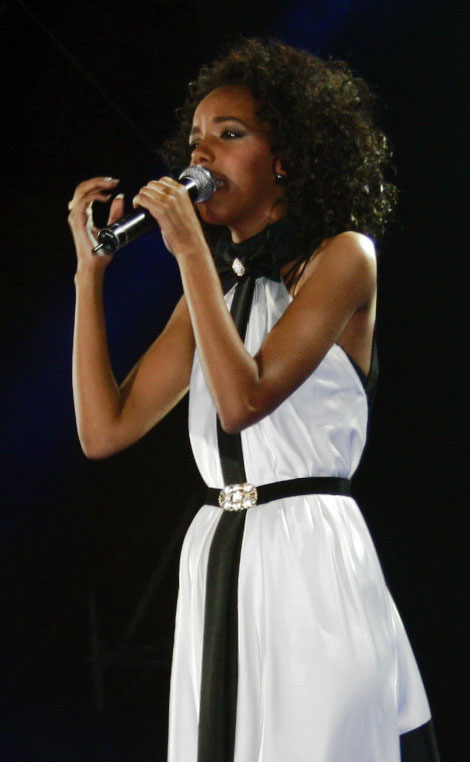
Hagit Yaso

- Abatte Barihun (born 1967) – an Israeli jazz saxophonist and composer.
- Cabra Casay (born 3 August 1982) – Israeli singer.
- Hannah Aharoni (born 1930) – Israeli-American singer.
- Emahoy Tsegué-Maryam Guèbrou (1923–2023) Ethiopian-Israeli nun and pianist (Christian).
- The sisters Ayala (born 21 August 1978) and Malka Ingedashet (born 1984) – both are Israeli singers.
- Hagit Yaso (born 1990) Israeli singer, winner of Kochav Nolad 9
- Teddy Aklilu (1977–2005) – an Israeli Amharic language singer.
- Jeremy Cool Habash – Rapper
- dBlackLion – Israeli singer
- Eden Alene – Ethiopian-Israeli singer, winner of the third season of The X Factor Israel and of the 7th season of the singing competition HaKokhav HaBa, represented Israel at the Eurovision Song Contest 2021

=== Writers ===
- Omri Teg'Amlak Avera (born 1977) – Israeli writer. Named "the first Ethiopian Writer" for his book "אסתרי" ("Asterai").
- Shai Amit – author.
- Abraham Adgeh – Israeli writer. His books "המסע אל החלום" ("The journey to the dream"), "עם הפנים קדימה" ("Facing forward") and the futuring novel "אלמז" ("Almaz" – Amharic for "Diamond").
- Asefu Baro – Israeli female writer, poet and academic.

=== Journalists ===
- Tsega Melaku – radio personality, Amharic language newscaster on Channel 33 and the director of Reshet Aleph radio station.
- Fasil legesse – one of the founders of the Amharic-language broadcast at Israel Radio and the director of Israeli-Ethiopian television channel (IETV).
- Berhanu Tegegne – news reporter in israeli News Company.
- Ayanawo Fareda Senbatu – journalist in Channel 1.
- Abraham Yerday – activist and Tigrinya language newscaster in Rekha radio.
- Rahamim Elazar – activist and Amharic language newscaster in Rekha radio.
- Danny Adino Ababa (born 1976) – Israeli journalist and publicist.
- Germaw Mengistu – journalist and the editor of Yedioth Nagt newspaper.

=== Fashion ===
- Esti Mamo (born 29 January 1983) – an Israeli model. She is one of the first Ethiopian-Israelis to make it into the entertainment industry, and is a budding actress
- Mazal Pikado – Ethiopian-Israeli model and singer.
- Israela Abtau – Ethiopian-Israeli model, Elite Model Look Israel 2003.
- Shani Mashsha – Ethiopian-Israeli model.
- Esti Elias – Ethiopian-Israeli model.
- Mimi Taddesse – Ethiopian-Israeli model (Israel's Next Top Model).
- Fanta Prada – Ethiopian-Israeli model.
- Yityish Titi Aynaw – Miss Israel 2013
- Tahounia Rubel – Ethiopian-Israeli model. She became widely known as the first Ethiopian-born to win the fifth series of HaAh HaGadol (the Israeli version of Big Brother) and the first Ethiopian-born Jew to win a beauty pageant in Israel.
- Avi Yitzhak – fashion designer.

== Education ==
- David Mihret – Director of the Steering Center For Ethiopian Immigrants in the Education System.
- Pnina Gaday-Agenyahu – Director of Hillel Foundation, Tel Aviv University

== See also ==
- Israelis
- List of Israelis
- List of Jews from Sub-Saharan Africa
