= List of Zeta Beta Tau members =

Zeta Beta Tau (ZBT) is a social fraternity which was founded in 1898. ZBT brothers can be found in all aspects of life: business, entertainment, media, politics, tech, philanthropy, and more.

== Academia ==
Name	Chapter	Institution	Notability	Ref.
Lawrence S. Bacow	Xi	Massachusetts Institute of Technology	President of Harvard University	
Eli Capilouto	Psi	University of Alabama	President of University of Kentucky	
Robert E. Fischell	Alpha Upsilon	Duke University	Johns Hopkins University Applied Physics Laboratory	
Joel Greenblatt	Theta	University of Pennsylvania	Adjunct professor at the Columbia University Graduate School of Business	
Stephen Joel Trachtenberg	Delta	Columbia University	President of George Washington University	

== Art ==
Name	Chapter	Institution	Notability	Ref.
Marvin Lipofsky	Rho	University of Illinois	Studio glass artist	
Mike Luckovich	Alpha Mu	University of Washington	Political cartoonist for the Atlanta Journal-Constitution	

== Business ==
Name	Chapter	Institution	Notability	Ref.
Burton Baskin	Rho	University of Illinois	Founder of Baskin Robbins	
Graenum Berger	Omega	University of Missouri	Social worker, writer, and founder of American Association for Ethiopian Jews	
Henry W. Bloch	Phi	University of Michigan	Co-founder of H&R Block	
Richard Bloch	Theta	University of Pennsylvania	Co-founder of H&R Block	
Paul Breitenbach	Kappa	Cornell University	Co-founder of Priceline.com	
Jeffrey Brotman	Alpha Mu	University of Washington	Co-founder of Costco Wholesale Corporation	
Jerome A. Chazen	Alpha Kappa	University of Wisconsin–Madison	Founder and chairman emeritus of Liz Claiborne, Inc.	
Steven A. Cohen	Theta	University of Pennsylvania	Founder of Point72 Asset Management and owner of the New York Mets	
Larry Flax	Alpha Mu	University of Washington	Co-founder of California Pizza Kitchen	
Bernard Gimbel	Theta	University of Pennsylvania	Chairman of the board of Gimbel Brothers Department Stores	
Alan C. Greenberg	Omega	University of Missouri	CEO of The Bear Stearns Companies	
Armand Hammer	Alpha	Columbia University	Founder and president, Occidental Petroleum	
Jon Hirschtick	Xi	Massachusetts Institute of Technology	Founder, SolidWorks	
Andrew Huang	Xi	Massachusetts Institute of Technology	Hardware lead, Chumby; renowned researcher and hacker	
Jules Kroll	Kappa	Cornell University	Founder of Kroll Associates	
Howard R. Levine	Alpha Pi	University of North Carolina at Chapel Hill	Chairman of the Board and CEO of Family Dollar	
Stanley Marcus	Tau	Harvard University	President and CEO, Neiman Marcus Department Stores	
William S. Paley	Theta	University of Pennsylvania	Founder and chairman of the board, CBS	
Carter Reum	Delta	Columbia University	Venture capitalist, serial entrepreneur	
Jerry Speyer	Delta	Columbia University	Co-founder of Tishman Speyer	
Jack L. Warner	Alpha Delta	University of California – Los Angeles	President, Warner Brothers	

== Crime ==
Name	Chapter	Institution	Notability	Ref.
Richard Loeb		University of Chicago	Half of the notorious murder duo, Leopold and Loeb	

== Entertainment ==
Name	Chapter	Institution	Notability	Ref.
Mel Allen	Psi	University of Alabama	Sports Broadcaster ("The Voice of the NY Yankees" and This Week in Baseball )	
Marc Bell	Rechartered	Babson College	Two-time Tony Award winner	
Jack Benny	Alpha Rho	University of California – Los Angeles	Television and radio comedian	
Leonard Bernstein	Alpha Zeta	Harvard University	Composer known for West Side Story; conductor of the New York Philharmonic	
Hal Block	Alpha Beta	University of Chicago	Comedian, comedy writer, and producer	
Benjy Bronk	Alpha Psi	Pennsylvania State University	Comedian and writer, The Howard Stern Show	
Jerry Bruckheimer	Alpha Omicron	University of Arizona	Film and television producer	
Leonard Cohen	Upsilon	McGill University	Singer, songwriter, and poet	
Samuel Goldwyn Jr.	Alpha Beta	University of Chicago	Film producer and director with MGM	
Aaron Karo	Theta	University of Pennsylvania	Author and comedian	
Hawk Koch	Alpha Rho	University of California, Los Angeles	Film producer	
Jeph Loeb	Delta	Columbia University	Producer of TV Series Smallville and Lost	
Robert Q. Lewis	Eta	University of Michigan	Television personality, actor, game show host	
Jerry Herman	Alpha Omega	University of Miami	Playwright: Hello Dolly!, La Cage aux Folles	
Albert Maltz	Delta	Columbia University	Screenwriter and member of the Hollywood Ten	
Joseph L. Mankiewicz	Delta	Columbia University	Film director, screenwriter, and producer, best known as the writer-director of All About Eve.	
Doug Morris	Delta	Columbia University	CEO of Sony Music	
Michael Ovitz	Alpha Rho	University of California – Los Angeles	President of Walt Disney Studios	
Bradley Steven Perry	Alpha Delta	University of Southern California	Actor	
Harold Ramis	Alpha Xi	Washington University in St. Louis	Writer, director, producer, actor (Ghostbusters, Animal House, Analyze This)	
Ari Sandel	Beta Alpha Theta	University of Colorado – Boulder	Oscar-winning short film director and writer known for West Bank Story	
Dick Schaap	Alpha Iota	Cornell University	Sports Broadcaster	
Michael Shamberg	Alpha Xi	Washington University in St. Louis	Jersey Films – director, producer, actor	
Andrew Volpe	Alpha Xi	Washington University in St. Louis	Singer and rhythm guitarist for alternative rock band Ludo	
Mike Wallace	Eta	University of Michigan	Senior correspondent, 60 Minutes	
David Michael Barrett	Gamma Beta	California State University, Northridge	Screenwriter and film producer	
Lee Adams	Nu	Ohio State University	Lyricist and two-time Tony Award winner	
Jerome Lawrence	Nu	Ohio State University	Playwright	

== Law ==
Name	Chapter	Institution	Notability	Ref.
Steve Cooley	Gamma Nu	California State University, Los Angeles	Los Angeles County District Attorney	
Arthur Goldberg	Lambda	DePaul University	Supreme Court Justice	
Robert Shapiro	Alpha Rho	University of California – Los Angeles	Lawyer, Attorney for OJ Simpson	

== Literature and journalism ==
Name	Chapter	Institution	Notability	Ref.
Walter Annenberg	Zeta	University of Pennsylvania	Founder and publisher of TV Guide; Ambassador to Great Britain	
Army Archerd	Alpha Rho	University of California – Los Angeles	Daily Variety columnist	
William Gaines	Sigma	Brooklyn Collegiate and Polytechnic Institute	Publisher of Mad Magazine	
Stanley G. Weinbaum	Alpha Kappa	University of Wisconsin-Madison	Science Fiction author and poet	
Robert Zelnick	Epsilon	Cornell University	World News Tonight Pentagon Correspondent, Chairman of Boston University Department of Journalism	

== Politics ==
Name	Chapter	Institution	Notability	Ref.
Rudy Boschwitz	Rho	Johns Hopkins University	Senator, Minnesota	
Steve Cohen	Alpha Gamma	Vanderbilt University	Representative, Tennessee	
Ron Dermer	Theta	University of Pennsylvania	Israeli Minister of Strategic Affairs, Ambassador to the United States	
Kenneth Duberstein	Alpha Tau	Franklin & Marshall	Chief of Staff, President Ronald Reagan	
Stuart Eizenstat	Alpha Pi	University of North Carolina at Chapel Hill	Ambassador to the European Union and Chief Presidential Adviser	
Martin Frost	Omega	University of Missouri	Representative, Texas (CD24)	
Benjamin Gilman	Zeta	University of Pennsylvania	Representative, New York	
Charles L. Glazer	Chi	University of Virginia	Ambassador to El Salvador	
Craig Goldman	Lambda	University of Texas at Austin	Representative, Texas	
Stanley Hartt	Upsilon	McGill University	Chief of Staff to the Prime Minister of Canada	
William Lehman	Psi	University of Alabama	Representative, Florida	
Sam Massell	Mu	University of Georgia	Mayor of Atlanta	
Abner Mikva	Pi	University of Wisconsin	Representative, Illinois	
Newton Minow	Gamma	Northwestern University	Federal Communications Commission Chairman	
Marc B. Nathanson	Iota	University of Denver	Ambassador to Norway	
Richard Neuberger	Alpha Mu	University of Washington	Senator, Oregon	
Abraham Ribicoff	Honorary Member	New York University, University of Chicago	Representative and Senator, Connecticut	
Louis Susman	Phi	University of Michigan	Ambassador to the United Kingdom	

== Sports ==
Name	Chapter	Institution	Notability	Ref.
Zach Banner	Alpha Delta	University of Southern California	National Football League player	
Kyle Berkshire	Delta Iota	University of Central Florida	Professional golfer	
Tal Brody	Rho	University of Illinois	Professional basketball player	
Mike Epstein	Alpha Eta	University of California-Berkeley	Major League Baseball player	
Donnie Edwards	Alpha Rho	University of California – Los Angeles	All-Pro NFL Linebacker, Kansas City Chiefs	
Sid Gillman	Nu	Ohio State University	Professional football coach	
Art Heyman		Duke University	Professional basketball player	
Robert Kraft	Delta	Columbia University	Owner, New England Patriots, New England Revolution, and Gillette Stadium	
Barry Latman	Alpha Delta	University of Southern California	Professional Baseball Pitcher	
Al Lerner	Delta	Columbia University	Founder of MBIA and owner of the Cleveland Browns	
Sid Luckman	Delta	Columbia University	Member of the College & Professional Football Hall of Fame	
Jim Nance	Omicron	Syracuse University	NFL fullback	
Abe Pollin	Alpha Mu	George Washington University	Owner, Washington Wizards	
Carroll Rosenbloom	Theta	University of Pennsylvania	American entrepreneur and owner of the Baltimore Colts and the Los Angeles Rams	
Bruce Sherman	Rho Iota	University of Rhode Island	Owner of the Miami Marlins	
Brandon Sosna		University of Pennsylvania	Sports administrator and executive	
Sonny Werblin	Beta Delta	Rutgers University	Owner of New York Jets, Chairman of Madison Square Garden	

== See also ==
- List of Zeta Beta Tau chapters
