= Menashe Zemro =

Ethiopian-born Israeli-Ethiopian religious leader

Menashe Zemro מנשה זמרו
- Title: Kes

Personal life
- Born: 1905-1906 Gondar, Ethiopia
- Died: 7 October 1998 (92 years old) Kiryat Gat, Israel

Religious life
- Religion: Judaism
- Denomination: Beta Israel

Menashe Zemro (Hebrew: מנשה זמרו, Amharic: ምናሼ ዘምሮ). He was born 1905 or 1906 and died 7 October 1998 at age 92. He is regarded as a Hakham and the last Kahen of the Ethiopian Jews.

== Biography ==
Zemro was born in 1906 to his mother, Amal Tafeta, and his father, Zimrah Makro, in the Beta Israel village of Senbati, located in Gondar, Ethiopia.

During his childhood, he worked as a farmer and shepherd in his village of Sanbati, a name that translates to Shabbat in Hebrew. In 1921, he journeyed to the Simien Mountains, where he spent eight years studying with elders in his community dedicating to Torah study several hours a day.

In 1929, he went back to his hometown of Sanbati and engaged Tekula, the daughter of his spiritual mentor, Kahen Eliel. He played a crucial role as his assistant in guiding his community in all matters, and was later was ordained a Kahen in 1931.

He was the Liqa Kahnat of the Jews of Dembiya, which was said to house 45,000 Jews being one of the largest villages in the community and makes up a fifth of the Beta Israel community in Israel today. According to reports this area was significantly targeted by Missionaries from British and German Protestant groups who attempted to proselytise by offering commodities such as education and healthcare which was a rarity in Ethiopia at the time, his efforts led to the closure of the mission's clinic and school in the village of Dembiya, which had been attempting to convert Jews to Christianity.

== Aliyah to Israel ==
In 1977, following the State of Israel's decision to welcome Ethiopian Jews, Mengistu Haile Mariam, who had taken control in Ethiopia, cut off relations with Israel, thereby hindering legal immigration. This led Israel to plan a comphensive and highly risky operation which were later known as Operation Moses 1984 which lead to the deaths of 4,000 people who died along the route in Sudan, before the immigration he expressed his disapproval of the journey to the Land of Israel through Sudan, citing the perilous nature of the route, which he deemed more hazardous than outright prohibition, and advocated for a more patient approach.

In 1989, the Derg government of Ethiopia was coming to an end, this led for an opportunity for Zemro to migrate with the rest of his community that was left behind after following his advice, because of his stature and his age, the Israelis wanted to bring him to Israel as soon as possible, and in the summer of 1990 they were ready. But then the Gulf War began. The American Association for Ethiopian Jews representative told Zemro that they had to wait for the flight because of the increasing tensions of the Gulf War,

Zemro looked amazed and said: 'What?! If there is a war in Israel, bring me there immediately. Put a gun in my hand and I'll join the war.' The agency representative told him it was too dangerous. Menashe replied: "You don't understand. Israel is my country. I'm not going there to find a more comfortable life. I'm going home, to my country. If there is a fight, I will fight. If Israel is at war, I will defend it. Take me now." According to Susan Pollack, an activist at the American Association for Ethiopian Jews: His eyes were bright; he radiated energy; and surprisingly, given the tense circumstances, he was also brimming with humor and jokes. He migrated on the Hanukkah of 1989 in the Operation Solomon, he was honoured by the Sephardi Chief Rabbi of Israel Ovadia Yosef, who regarded him as the Chief Rabbi of Ethiopian Jews. However he was not satisfied with this title, and spoke about the lack of recognition of the State of Israel in all the Kahenat. When he did Aliyah, he landed in Ben Gurion Airport, where he was warmly received by Religious Zionist spiritual leader Haim Drukman and his students from Bnei Akiva Yeshiva which was documented by Steven Spielberg.

== Concerns over conversions to Rabbinical Judaism ==
In 1993, Zemro and a congregation of religious authorities in the Beta Israel community was hosted by Sephardi Chief Rabbi of Israel Mordechai Eliyahu and other religious figures in both Ashkenazi and Sephardic Religious Zionist communities, who were speaking about the importance of the acceptance of Rabbinic Judaism in their community, Zemro, who was somewhat insulted by these words, recanted in Amharic; "In front of all of us, I ask you to bring me your Torah and I will bring the Torah of Moses." In addition, he said to Raphael Hadane, who was the Chief Rabbi at the time; "You let them change our religion!". As an advocate of higher recognition of Haymanot he was somewhat insulted by these words, the interaction was broadcast on Channel 1 (Israel).

According to Shoshana Ben-Dor, an anthropologist in Jerusalem and the director in Israel for the North American Conference on Ethiopian Jewry, said Kes Menashe was ''very unhappy that the traditional forms of Judaism that he had practiced were not being accepted by Israel authorities and were being allowed to disappear.'' According to the Radbaz, the form of Judaism Zemro was pracitising and was present amongst the Ethiopian Jews were similar to that of the Sadducees.

== His position on the Talmud ==
According to an interview conducted by The American Association for Ethiopian Jews, he was asked about his views on the Talmud he replied with: "It teaches that family purity and prayer are greater than Torah study." Family purity and prayer are greater than Torah study. A person must observe at least three prayers a day: one prayer at dawn and a second prayer in the afternoon a third in the evening, this teaches a person to be careful not to depart from the laws of the Torah."

== Later years ==
Zemro spent his final years in Kiryat Gat where he died on 7 October 1998, aged 92. His funeral attracted thousands of mourners in the Ethiopian Jewish community and local residents who paid their respect to him. However, Israel television reported that no representatives of the Israeli rabbinate, Israel's governing religious body, were present. By the Rabbinite ruling, Zemro was not authorized to officiate at ceremonies like weddings and funerals, as he'd done in Ethiopia, and was indeed not to be called a Rabbi.

Pointedly ignoring this caution, Adisu Massala, a member of the Knesset of Ethiopian origin who spoke at the funeral, called Kes Menashe ''the Chief Rabbi of the Ethiopian Jewish community in both Ethiopia and Israel.''

Such cautions were not always heeded: A little more than a year after his arrival, 16 Ethiopian Jews were arrested as they rushed into the Prime Minister's office to demand that the rabbinate treat Zemro and his colleagues no differently than other rabbis.

There are now about 70 Ethiopian Jewish spiritual leaders in Israel, The Associated Press reported, but they are elderly and no longer possess even the local authority they had in Ethiopia. There are younger Ethiopian Jews who are pursuing Orthodox rabbinical studies. ''A person like him doesn't exist anymore,'' said Adisu Massala ''It looks like he was the last.''

He was survived by several children and grandchildren, according to the New York Times.
