= Samuel Berger =

Samuel Berger may refer to:

- Sandy Berger (Samuel Richard Berger, 1945–2015), American politician
- Sam Berger (lawyer) (1900–1992), Canadian lawyer, politician, and businessman
- Sam Berger (New York politician) (born 1998), American politician
- Samuel Berger (boxer) (1884–1925), American heavyweight boxer
- Samuel D. Berger (1911–1980), American diplomat
- Sam Berger, manager of Homestead Records from 1983 to 1984
