= Ras Deshen =

Ras Deshen may refer to

- The highest mountain of Ethiopia, most often spelled Ras Dashen
- The Ras Deshen Ensemble, an Israeli jazz duo named after the mountain
