= Israeli Andalusian Orchestra =

Israeli traditional orchestra

Israeli Andalusian Orchestra התזמורת האנדלוסית הישראלית אשדוד
- Orchestra
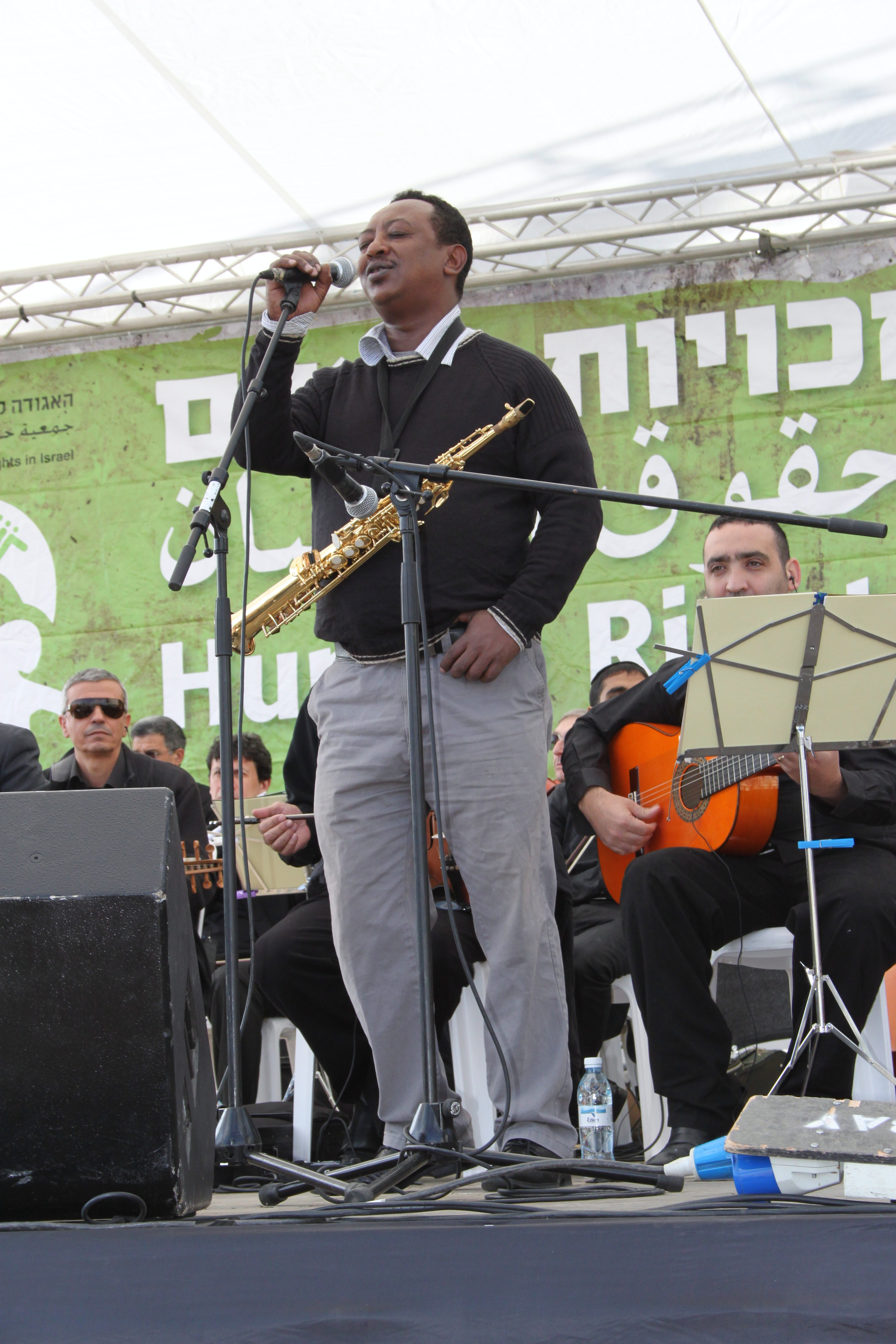
- Abate Berihun performing with the Israeli Andalusian Orchestra
- Founded: 1987
- Location: Ashdod, Israel
- Website: www.andalusit.co.il

The Israeli Andalusian Orchestra (Hebrew: התזמורת האנדלוסית הישראלית) is a musical ensemble based in Ashdod, Israel.

== History ==
Originating as a project to honor the heritage of immigrants from the Maghreb, the Israeli Andalusian Orchestra was formed in Ashdod in December 1987, as a joint initiative of the liturgical singer and classical conductor Moti Malka and then-mayor Arieh Azulay, both of Moroccan origin. The orchestra is financed by the Ashdod municipality and the Culture Ministry and has toured Israel, the United States, and several European countries.

The orchestra comprises around 30 musicians and singers, mainly of Tunisian, Moroccan and Russian origin. It features traditional Sephardic, Jewish-Arab and Andalusian music and poetry, combining classical Arab-Andalusian and Western instruments. The orchestra's artistic director and head conductor is Sivan Albo-Ben Hur. Guest musicians who have performed with the orchestra include Raymonde Abecassis and Abate Barihun.

== Awards and recognition ==
In 2006, the orchestra was awarded the Israel Prize, for its lifetime achievement and special contribution to society and the State.

In 2025, President Isaac Herzog's office named Moti Malka, founder of the orchestra, among the nine recipients of the Presidential Medal of Honour.

== See also ==
- Music of Israel
- List of Israel Prize recipients
