= Yosef Hadane =

Ethiopian rabbi

Yosef Hadane יוסף הדנה
- Title: Rabbi

Personal life
- Born: Yosef Hadane; 1949 (age 76–77) Ethiopia
- Parent: Raphael Hadane (father)

Religious life
- Religion: Judaism
- Denomination: Orthodox Judaism

Jewish leader
- Residence: Israel

Yosef Hadane (Hebrew: יוסף הדנה, Amharic: ዮሴፍ ሀደኔ; born 1949) is the former chief rabbi of the Ethiopian community in Israel and the first Ethiopian Israeli to be ordained as an Orthodox rabbi.

== Biography ==
Hadane was born to a prominent Kes, Raphael Hadane. In the 1970s he attended rabbinical school in Turin, Italy, with the intention of returning to Ethiopia. However, due to political unrest on the eve of the Ethiopian Civil War, he instead immigrated to Israel in 1972.

In 1979 Hadane became the first Ethiopian Israeli to be ordained as an Orthodox rabbi in Israel. That year, he also began working for the Ministry of Religious Services.

In 1985, he assisted his family in immigrating to Israel.

Hadane later joined his brother Emanuel Hadane in arguing on behalf of the right of the Falash Mura to immigrate to Israel. He publicly criticized the Petah Tikva rabbinate for its "discriminatory practices" towards Ethiopian Jews who wanted to marry.

In June 2016, Hadane was informed by the Ministry of Religious Services that he would be forced to retire from his position as chief rabbi of the Ethiopian community. At the time, he was the only Ethiopian rabbi in the Ministry. Tzohar claimed that he was forced to retire for supporting the Falash Mura's right to marriage equality. The Ministry claimed that he had simply reached the standard age of retirement, while others noted that other rabbis are routinely given extensions. Ultimately he was given a six-month extension as a result of public outcry.

Hadane stepped down in 2017 as chief rabbi of the Ethiopian community. Initially, the Ministry determined that there were no qualified candidates to replace him, but he was later replaced by Reuven Wabashat.
