= Reuven Wabashat =

Ethiopian Chief Rabbi of Israel

Reuven Wabashat (Hebrew: ראובן וואבאשט; born 1971) is the current Ethiopian Chief Rabbi of Israel since 2018, a year after his predecessor, Rabbi Yosef Hadane, stepped down.

== Biography ==
Wabashat made aliyah to Israel from Ethiopia at the age of 2 in 1973 and grew up in Ramla.

In 1989, he was conscripted into the Israel Defense Forces, serving in the Golani Brigade and later received his rabbinic ordination from Sephardic Chief Rabbi Ovadia Yosef.
