= Uri Ben Baruch =

Ethiopian Jewish priest

- אורי בן ברוך
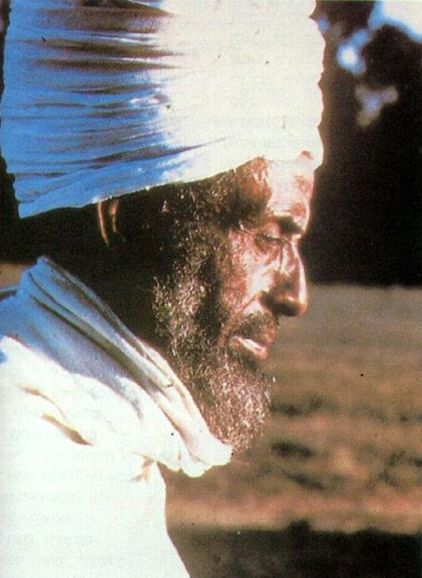
- Born: 1898; Balnagab, Begemder, Ethiopian Empire
- Died: December 21, 1984 (aged 85–86)
- Occupation: Liqa Kahnet
- Organization: קהילות בית ישראל "Beta Israel's Congregation"
- Parent: Baruch Ahdnan (father)

Uri Ben Baruch (Hebrew: אורי בן ברוך, 1898 – December 21, 1984) was a Liqa Kahnet (High priest) and the main leader of the Ethiopian Jewish community for nearly 50 years, from the Italian occupation of Ethiopia until his death.

For many years Uri Ben Baruch was a dominant figure in the leadership of the Beta Israel community.

== Biography ==
=== Childhood and youth ===
Baruch was born in 1898 in the village Balnagab in northern Ethiopia to the prominent Liqa Kahnet Baruch Ahdnan who was the main spiritual leader of the Ethiopian Jews for many years until his death. Baruch was the third son of 8 brothers and sisters.

Three of Baruch's brothers studied religion with their father and from other priests. His father was considered to be the spiritual leader of the Beta Israel community and later became a close friend of Dr. Jacques Faitlovitch, who visited their village several times and discussed matters of religion with Kes Abba Baruch Ahdnan many times.

=== As the Liqa Kahnat (High priest) in Ethiopia ===
When Baruch's father reached old age, various parties in the Beta Israel community began requesting that Baruch would be appointed as a successor to his father, thus becoming the spiritual leader of the Beta Israel community. Baruch gently refused, claiming that he wasn't eligible since he was not the eldest son. After many convictions he eventually accepted the request, and was appointed as the new religious leader in a grand ceremony in the presence of 120 religious leaders and the general public. Baruch's father eventually died in 1936. Baruch was the main spiritual leader of the Ethiopian Jewish community for nearly 50 years.

In 1966, Baruch took part in the establishment of the organization "Beta Israel's Congregation" (קהילות בית ישראל) which aimed at promoting immigration to the state of Israel amongst the Beta Israel community living in all provinces of Ethiopia. As part of these efforts, through the years Baruch sent various letters to Israeli prime ministers, presidents and other officials in an attempt to gain their help. In these letters Baruch described the dire situation of the Ethiopian Jews, which he claimed was deteriorating due to the mission operations, hostilities and discrimination from the government. Due to this activity Baruch and his son, Yair Berhan, were both arrested and accused of subversive activity against the reign of Emperor Haile Selassie. Baruch and his son were brought to the emperor and were asked to explain the meaning of their acts. After several hours with the Emperor and his advisers, the emperor decided to release the two.

In 1973, when Rabbi Ovadia Yosef became the Chief Rabbi of Israel, Baruch's organization sent a letter to Yosef requesting official recognition of the Beta Israel community. Rabbi Ovadia Yosef's ruling was unequivocal and determined that the Beta Israel are Jews and must be rescued. Following this historic ruling the Israeli Law of Return was applied to the Beta Israel community on March 3, 1975, thus paving the way for their later massive immigration to the state of Israel.

=== Immigration to Israel ===
The Jewish Agency requested Baruch to become an example and immigrate to Israel in order to get the rest of the Beta Israel community to follow him. Baruch initially refused the request and claimed that the supreme leader must remain in Ethiopia until the last Jew left and that only then he would be capable of leaving. After pressure and persuasion from the Israeli establishment, Baruch decided to emigrate to Israel in August 1977, passing the community's leadership in Ethiopia to his son.

Having made aliyah, Baruch endeavored to bring the rest of his community to Israel. Among various efforts, he met with then-Chief Rabbi Ovadia Yosef and other officials in an attempt to promote continued immigration efforts. During his old age, he saw one of the biggest Beta Israel immigration waves to Israel take place in the early 80s.

Baruch died on December 21, 1984.

== See also ==
- Kes (Judaism)
- List of Israeli Ethiopian Jews
