= Graenum Berger =

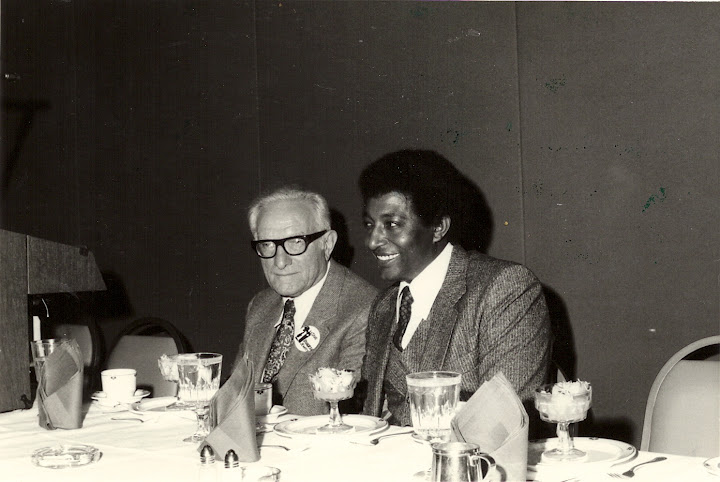
- Granum Berger (left) and Baruch Tegegne at an AAEJ National Conference in 1983
- Born: 1908; Gloversville, New York
- Died: 1999 (aged 90–91); New Rochelle, New York
- Occupations: Social Worker; Activist
- Spouse: Emma Finestein
- Children: B. Michael Berger

Graenum Berger (1908–1999) was an American Communal administrator, institutional and communal planner, educator, world traveler, and the founding President of the American Association for Ethiopian Jews.

He was the brother of Ambassador Samuel D. Berger.

== Background ==
Berger was born in Gloversville, New York the child of Jewish immigrant parents. His parents were Orthodox Jews, and Gloversville had a strong and vibrant Jewish community.

In 1955, Berger met a group of Ethiopian Jewish students in Israel. He had known there was a Jewish tribe in Ethiopia, but knew little about them. He began reading, and writing letters, and in ten years accumulated a vast file of information. While visiting Ethiopia in 1965, he found penniless Jews (known as Falasha) trying to eke out a primitive living in a country that discriminated against them in every aspect of their lives.

== Activism ==
As a Jewish communal executive who knew all the professional and volunteer leaders in the American Jewish community, he assumed all he had to do was to bring the problems of the Ethiopian Jews to their attention and they would be solved. He also presumed Israel would rise to the occasion and undertake a resettlement effort. He was wrong on both counts.

So began his 35-year effort to bring the 50,000 member Ethiopian Jewish community to Israel, which eventually led to Operation Moses in 1984–85, and Operation Solomon in 1991. Shortly before his death, Dr. Berger was asked to comment on the "Felash Mura", descendants of ancient Falasha whose families had long abandoned Judaism. He felt they were not Jews and should not be granted the right to go to Israel under the Law of Return. Regardless, the aliyah of the Felash Mura eventually began and continues to this day at the rate of 300 per month.

== Recognition ==
Berger was given an old prayer book written in Ge'ez and a circumcision knife by the community that he originally contacted as a thanks. After his death, they were given by his family to the rabbi of a synagogue in New York he was a founding member of, the Pelham Jewish Center.

Yeshiva University awarded Graenum the honorary degree of Doctor of Humane Letters in 1973. In 1989, the Graenum Berger Bronx Jewish Federation Service Center, a social welfare agency, was named in his honor.

After 43 years of professional leadership, Berger retired in 1973. He died in 1999.

== Publications ==
He authored a number of books including:

- The Jewish Community as a Fourth Force in American Jewish Life (1966)
- Black Jews in America (1978)
- The Turbulent Decades, vol. I and II (1981)
- Graenum (1987), an autobiography
- A Not So Silent Envoy (1992) a biography about his brother, Ambassador Samuel D. Berger
- Rescue the Ethiopian Jews! (1996), a memoir, and the story of his quest.

== See also ==
- Aliyah
- Aliyah from Ethiopia
- American Association for Ethiopian Jews
- Beta Israel
- Ethiopian Jews in Israel
- Law of Return
