= Samuel D. Berger =

American diplomat

Samuel David Berger
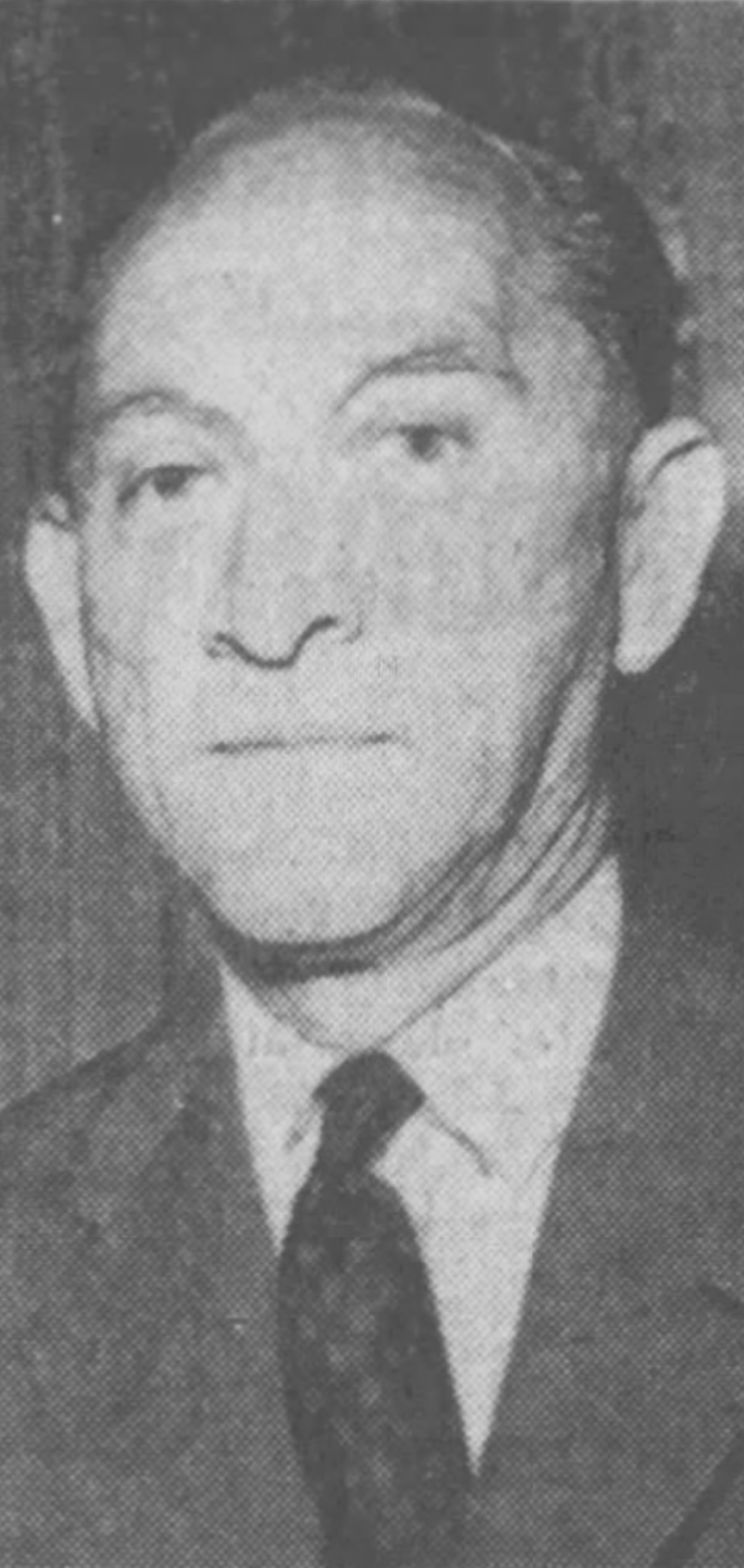

6th United States Ambassador to Korea
- In office June 27, 1961 – July 10, 1964
- President: John F. Kennedy; Lyndon B. Johnson
- Preceded by: Walter P. McConaughy
- Succeeded by: Winthrop G. Brown

Personal details
- Born: December 6, 1911 Gloversville, New York
- Died: February 12, 1980 (aged 68) Washington, D.C.
- Cause of death: Cancer
- Resting place: Arlington National Cemetery
- Spouse(s): Margaret Fowler (m. 1937; died 1967) Betty Lee Pressey (m. 1969; died 2002)
- Relatives: Graenum Berger, brother
- Education: University of Wisconsin; London School of Economics
- Profession: Diplomat

Military service
- Branch/service: United States Army
- Rank: Captain
- Battles/wars: World War II

Samuel David Berger (December 11, 1911 – February 12, 1980) was an American diplomat who served as United States Ambassador to Korea from 1961 to 1964.

== Early life ==
The brother of Graenum Berger, Samuel David Berger was born on December 6, 1911, in an Orthodox Jewish family. At the University of Wisconsin, where he studied economics and philosophy under Selig Perlman, he met his future wife, Margaret Fowler. In 1938 and 1939, he also studied at the London School of Economics, with a particular focus on the British trade union movement.

== Foreign Service career ==
During World War II, he worked in lend-lease matters, and served in the United States Army, ending the war as a captain. After the war, he proceeded to join the Foreign Service.

A career Foreign Service officer, he was posted to London, Tokyo, and New Zealand; during his service as a political advisor in Tokyo, his assessment of the Japanese Communist Party was opposite to that of Vice President Richard Nixon, who reassigned him to New Zealand.

== Ambassador ==
At the time of his nomination as United States Ambassador to Korea, in April 1961, he was serving in Greece. Confirmed by the Senate on June 12, he arrived in Seoul on June 24, in the immediate aftermath of May 16 coup, noting that the relationship between the United States and the Republic of Korea remained strong; a theme that he echoed when he presented his diplomatic credentials to Yun Posun, referring only to a "period of transition". Though he would try to prevail upon Park Chung-hee to hold elections, the efforts came to naught.

Whilst ambassador, he was promoted to the rank of career minister in July 1962. As ambassador, Berger cultivated a reticent attitude toward the media, as evinced by his moniker, "Silent Sam." All the same, he contributed to a rapprochement between Korea and Japan, and laid the groundwork for the future prosperity of Korea. In 1964, he was replaced by Winthrop G. Brown.

== Later career ==
After his service as ambassador, Berger (like his predecessor as ambassador, William S. B. Lacy) served as a deputy commandant of the National War College, before returning to the State Department as Deputy Assistant Secretary of State for Far Eastern Affairs.

In February 1968, President Lyndon B. Johnson appointed Berger Deputy Ambassador to South Vietnam, where he arrived on March 24; during his time there, he sometimes stood in for the ambassador, Ellsworth Bunker.

In January 1969, he married the widow of Admiral George Pressey in Hong Kong.

In 1972, he left South Vietnam, believing the Communists would not win, and returned to the United States, where he worked at the Foreign Service Institute before he retired in 1974.

After his death from cancer in 1980, his brother, Graenum Berger, wrote a book about his service.

Diplomatic posts
Preceded by Walter P. McConaughy	U.S. Ambassador to South Korea; 1961–1964	Succeeded by Winthrop G. Brown
