= Abate Berihun =

Israeli jazz saxophonist and composer (born 1967)

Abate Berihun אבטה בריהון
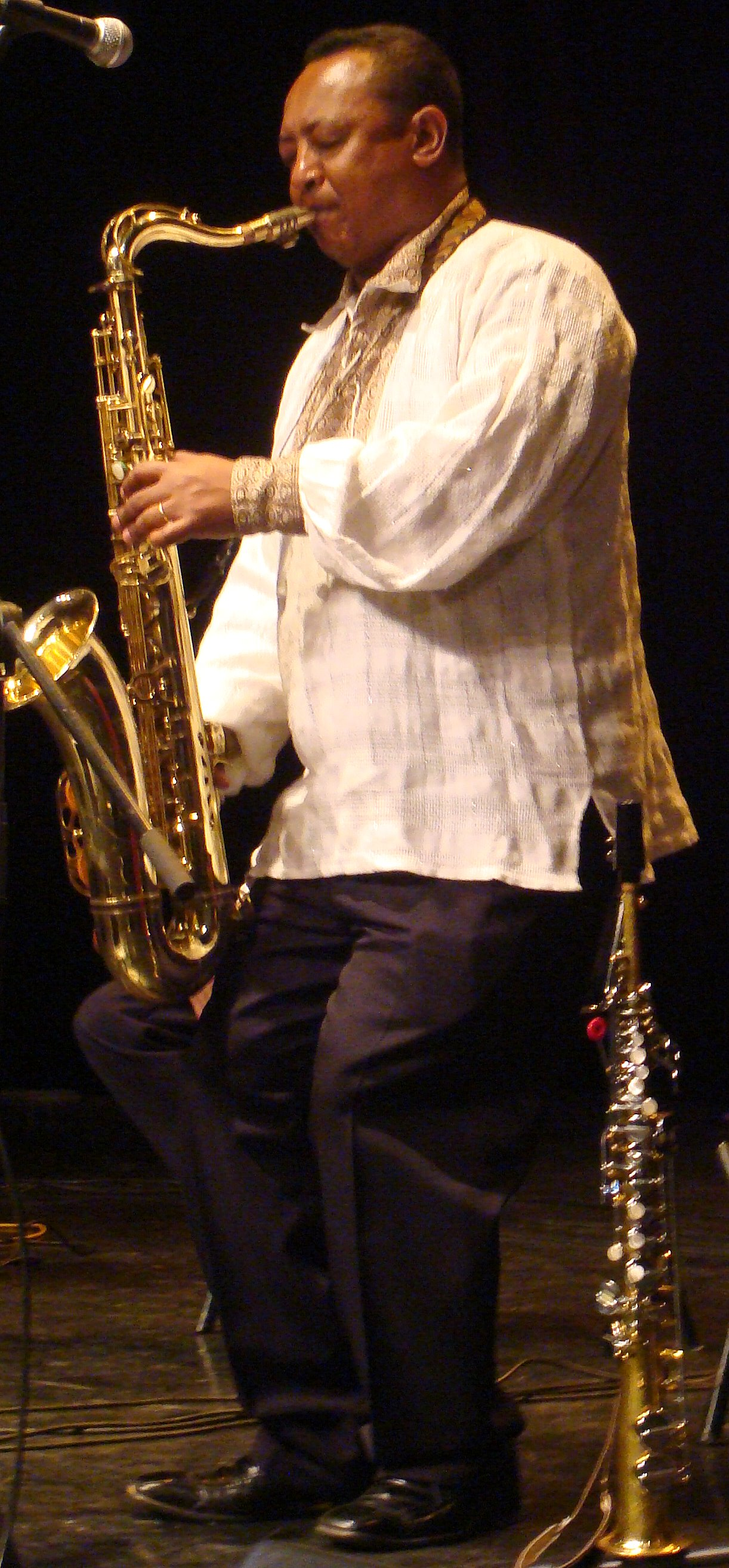
- Abate Berihun in a concert of Tezeta Ensemble, 2008

Background information
- Born: 1967 (age 58–59)
- Origin: Addis Ababa, Ethiopia
- Genre: Jazz
- Occupations: Musician, composer, bandleader, singer
- Instruments: Tenor saxophone, soprano saxophone, alto saxophone, trumpet
- Years active: 1983–present
- Website: addiskenproject.com

Abate Berihun (Hebrew: אבטה בריהון; born 1967) is an Ethiopia-born Israeli jazz saxophonist and composer. His sound is reminiscent of John Coltrane's, who has influenced Berihun's style.

== Early life and career (1967–1999) ==
Berihun was born in Addis Ababa, the capital city of Ethiopia, to a Jewish family. His house resided next to the music school of Addis Ababa University, as well as a nearby military base. Young Berihun fell for the march sound of the saxophones and other wind instruments emerging from the neighbouring military brass band. He got a saxophone and joined the music school, where he was exposed to the albums of Charlie Parker and others.

By the age of 16, Berihun joined the Ethiopian military band, with which he toured through Ethiopia and the Eastern Bloc. Mengistu Haile Mariam once sent him to play at Kim Il-sung's birthday in North Korea. This period in his life came to an abrupt end six years later, when the band's bus was ambushed by EPRDF forces, rebelling against Mengistu's Marxist dictatorship. Most band members were killed in the prolonged attack, and Berihun was wounded by two bullets.

For eight years Berihun kept playing every night at the Hilton and Sheraton hotels of Addis Ababa. He also played in the Ethiopian National Theater and toured with Mahmoud Ahmed. At the age of 21 he established his own jazz band, with which he toured Europe three times a year. His last European tour ended merely three weeks before his aliyah to Israel.

== Immigration to Israel ==
Berihun joined his family in Israel on 1999, leaving behind his ex-wife and their son Nahum. His dream - being a musician in Israel - has proven difficult to realize. Facing a language barrier and alimony, Berihun worked as a dishwasher in a restaurant through the day and as a night security guard. His fingers were burned by dishwashing detergents, hindering his practice with his saxophones. He was discovered by Moshe Bar-Yuda, then head of the Tomer NGO, and formerly (1957) one of the first Israeli emissaries to Beta Israel communities. Bar Yuda brought Berihun together with musicologist Shlomo Israeli, who was touched by Berihun's playing. Israeli paired Berihun with jazz pianist Yitzhak Yedid, a successful match that gave rise to the "Ras Deshen Ensemble".

== Ras Deshen ==
Berihun and Yedid's ensemble is named after the Amharic name of Ras Dashen mountain, the highest mountain in Ethiopia. Ras Dashen belongs to the rugged Semien Mountains, where Ethiopian Jews defended themselves against persecutions by the Christian Emperors of Ethiopia through the 14th-17th Centuries. Ras Deshen's premiere concert took place in September 2001 on a festival in Tel Aviv. In September 2002 the duo recorded its self-titular maiden album, which was released in 2004. The album was hailed by music critics and was rated among the two best Israeli jazz albums of the year.

The album blends free jazz with four musical modes used in the Ethiopian Highlands, comprising the qenet modal system. Three of these modes - Bati, Tezeta and Ambassel - originate from the Wollo region in the Ethiopian Highlands, where most of the Jewish community has concentrated. The fourth mode, Anchi Hoye, is used in religious music.

=== Anchi Hoye ===
which is the Jewish Ethiopian synagogue, as well as in the Ethiopian Orthodox Tewahedo Church. It is also used in wedding music, as well as in courting songs, love songs, and battle songs. Two tracks in the album are composed in this mode: Anchi Hoye and Nafkote.

"Anchi Hoye", the opening track, was composed by Berihun, reflecting his deep feelings for his beloved. Berihun's tenor saxophone opens with a style referencing both John Coltrane and Lester Young. Four minutes into the song comes a piano solo by Yedid, which was described as "so reminiscent of Keith Jarrett that his solo could be dropped seamlessly into the grooves of The Köln Concert".

"Nafkote", the sixth track, is a traditional longing song. Here Berihun first sings in Amharic, a feat he has not practiced back in Ethiopia. Yedid's piano traces the rhythm for about two minutes, then starts improvising on the scale. About a minute later Berihun improvises on top of Yedid's piano for about two minutes, then concludes with the traditional song.

=== Bati ===
Bati is a market town in the southern part of Wollo, in the Oromia Zone, between the Ethiopian Highlands and the Great Rift Valley. The musical mode named after it is used in praise songs for rulers and sages, as well as in yearning songs for a beloved. Two tracks in the album are composed in this mode: Bati and Birtukane.

"Bati" is a traditional song, telling of a man longing for his beloved woman, and going after her to Bati. The western listener may be familiar with this song from Ethiopiques Volume 15, which opens with a pounding performance of this song. Berihun and Yedid formulate a contemplative arrangement for this composition, which preserves its original mode. The piano silently accompanies Berihun's sobbing soprano sax, then his singing. Towards the fifth minute Yedid interprets the piece on his piano, to which Berihun joins for a penetrating duet. The composition ends with Berihun's singing, sealed with a sigh.

"Birtukane", "my orange", is a traditional longing song to the family and loved ones who are far away. Krar player Fentahon Malessa accompanies Berihun's improvisations on the saxophone, in an instrumental variation of Assafe Abatte's melody, in Bati-minor mode.

=== Tezeta ===
"Tezeta" means "nostalgia", a bittersweet longing for the past. Tezeta mode is used to express dreams, wishes and yearnings. Ethiopian Jews used this mode to express their yearning to Jerusalem and the Land of Israel. After coming to Israel, this mode has been used to express nostalgia to Ethiopia. Some love and wedding songs were also composed in this mode, that originates from the Wollo region. Berihun & Yedid excel at performing the two pieces composed in this mode: Yehar Shererit and Fikir.

"Yehar Shererit", "Spider web", is a traditional song describing the difficult life of the spider, endlessly weaving its artistic silky web. Its melody, composed by singer Hirut Bekele in Tezeta-minor mode, is served in an instrumental arrangement. The dramatic element of the composition is steadily built, from the opening piano tap to the tenor groans at the fourth minute. The first peak of the duet leads to a brief piano session, after which the saxophone clears its path to a touching exhibition of creativity to the end of the composition. Multiple brilliant instants are packed into these seven short minutes, illustrating that the mutual inspiration between Berihun and Yedid yields their most fascinating moments. Music critic T.K. Holmes has remarked that Abate's tenor "has a palpable R&B/gospel tinge, with an occasional gutbucket growl added for good measure, working in tandem with Yedid's playful boogie-woogie chaos".

"Fikir", "Love", was composed by Tilahun Gessesse in Tezeta-minor mode. It utters the wonder of love that is beyond words. Yedid first accompanies Berihun's tenor for about 3.5 minutes, followed by Berihun's chant. A piano solo then follows, over which the saxophone swirls into a rich expression of love. An additional cycle of singing then seals the composition. Downtown Music Gallery has commented on this tune that Berihun "reaches even deeper into his heart and soul and sings this touching piece sublime spirit".

=== Ambassel ===
Ambassel is a mountain fortress ruled by the Jantirar, and a woreda named after it in Wollo region. Ambassel district raised many musicians and music lovers. Ambassel mode is used for singing historical and traditional tales and for children's songs. Its popularity throughout Ethiopia grew as Empress Menen Asfaw, the daughter of Jantirar Asfaw, became consort of Emperor Haile Selassie.

"Ambassel", the seventh piece in the album, is a traditional tune upon which the singer improvises stories of his emotions, or historical tales. Here Fentahon Malessa's Krar accompanies player Berihun's improvisations on the saxophone, leaving the listener to imagine the musical tales that could have been embroidered by Berihun, Yedid and Malessa together.

=== Behatito Kadus Kadus ===
The ending song of the album is an adaptation of a prayer sung on Shacharit of Yom Kippur and other Jewish holidays. Its name "Behatito Kadus Kadus" - "You alone are holy holy" in Ge'ez - reflects the persistent belief of Ethiopian Jews in the unity of God, in face of the surrounding belief in the trinity. The prayer, in the sacred language Ge'ez, has different versions for Shalosh regalim and for the High Holy Days. Traditionally it is sung by six Kessim repeatedly answering one of them ("Behatito" - "Kadus Kadus!"). In the album Berihun sings it as a personal ode, while preserving the original melody, surprisingly reminiscent of the blues. At the third minute Yedid vamps like Fats Waller, as Berihun's tenor Sax "grooves between Ethiopia and the Mississippi Delta". The New Orleans tinge and piercing theme have made it popular among the Israeli and Western audience alike.

=== Psalms ===
In December 2005 Ras Deshen started a concert titled "Psalms" ("מזמורי תהלים"). It consists of nine pieces based on Kessim chants, consolidated into a suite. The duo was joined by singer Esther Keinan-Ofri, drummer Tegen Zenba, contrabassist Ora Boazsson-Chorev and dancer Tezeta. Composed by Berihun, Yedid and Keinan-Ofri, it blended Israeli, Arabic, and classical elements with the corresponding Kessim chants.

== Kuluma ==
In December 2003 Berihun established the Kuluma band, together with Itamar Borochov (trumpet), Alon Yoffe (drums and vocals), Uri Naveh (West African percussion), Sangit Dotan Segal (Afro-Cuban percussion and vocals), Orr Bareket (bass guitar) and David Adda (keyboards and vocals). In December 2005 they released their debut album, Mother Tongue ("שפת אם"). Both the album and their concerts, mixing Ethiopian music with Cuban influences, gained critical acclaim.

== Other collaborations ==
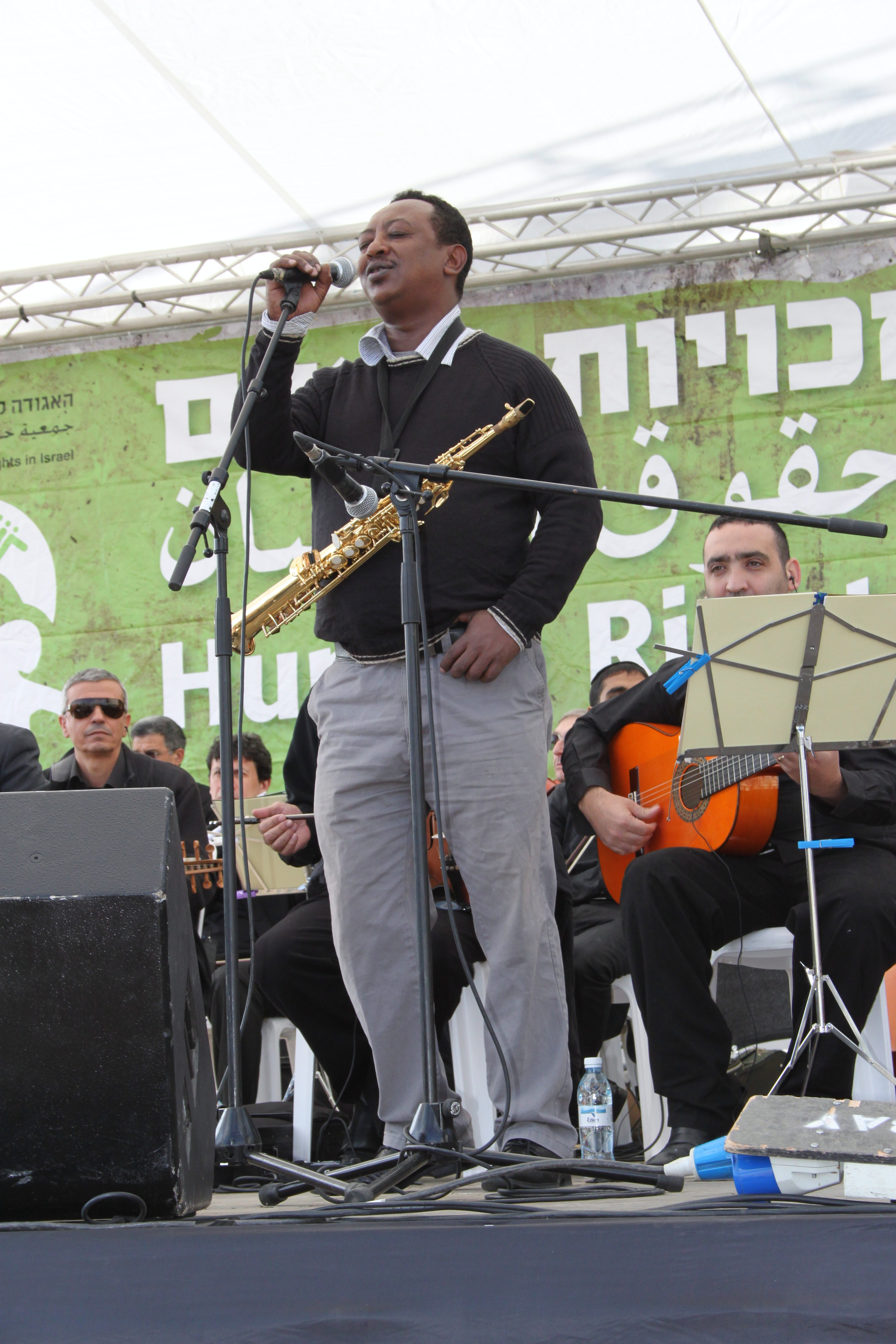
Abate Berihun collaborating with the Israeli Andalusian Orchestra at the International Human Rights March, Tel Aviv, 2011.

Ariel Zilber has supported Berihun and added him to his concerts since they met. Berihun participated in Zilber's 2005 album Anabel, writing and composing its titular song Anabel. He joined the East West Ensemble to their concert "The Hidden Spirituals" ("מוסיקה מעולמות עליונים"), released as a 2006 album titled "Kabbalah Music - The Hidden Spirituals". Berihun sings the chant Behatito Kadus Kadus on a different arrangement, escorted by the ensemble.

Berihun plays with Nadav Haber's quartet on their acclaimed Addis Mist concert, starting 2006. Haber described his meeting with Berihun as an important step in his musical development: "Abate taught me what the saxophone can do in Ethiopian music, and only after I met him I became an Ethiopian saxophonist myself. The inspiration he gave me made me start practicing twice as much".

In May 2007 Berihun played on Melbourne Jazz Festival with Australian pianist Aaron Choulai, on a concert termed "the most unique showcase of the entire festival". Their three gigs through the festival, including compositions from Ras Deshen's repertoire, drew high attention.

Berihun appears on "Temanesh", the closing track of The Apples 2016 album "Dragonz".
