= Shmuel Beru =

Ethiopian Israeli Jewish actor and director

- שמואל ברו
- Born: Shumiya Bru; 1975 (age 50–51); Amhara Region, Ethiopia
- Citizenship: Israel
- Education: University of Haifa (2001)
- Occupation: Film director
- Notable work: Zrubavel (2008)

Shmuel Beru (Hebrew: שמואל ברו, Amharic: ሽሙኤል በሪሁ) is an Ethiopian Jew who migrated to Israel where he became an actor, screenwriter, and film director.

== Biography ==
A native of Ethiopia, he was born to a Beta Israel family in 1975 with the name Shumiya Bru that lived near Gondar, in the village of Gond Roch-Marim.

Beru migrated to Israel at age 8, in 1984 with the first wave of Ethiopian immigrants, traveling via Sudan a year before Operation Moses began. Once there he would become an oddity amongst his new, predominantly lighter skinned classmates, and adopt the name Shmuel.

Beru served in the Israel Defense Force, from 1996 to 1999, he would also begin acting the same year that he joined the military in the Israeli Army Theatre. He would find few openings for African actors, and the work he did receive typecast him as a pauper, bad guy, or a bodyguard despite his small build.

Beru would begin screenwriting by making skits with fellow actor Yossi Vassa, who he met at the University of Haifa, which he went to between 1999 and 2001 for a B.A. in both theatre and political science. Building off of that, Beru, inspired by the works of Spike Lee, would then write his first feature film and make his directorial debut with the film Zrubavel. It came out in 2008 and garnering him acclaim in his new residence of Tel Aviv. This film would officially make him the first Ethiopian film director in Israel, and received an award at the Haifa International Film Festival. It was a film partially based on his own experiences as an Ethiopian migrant in Israel. In it he would examine the faults of the Beta Israel community and the hardships they faced from the society they found themselves in.
