= List of Zeta Beta Tau chapters =

Zeta Beta Tau is a North American fraternity established on December 29, 1898. It absorbed Phi Sigma Delta fraternity in 1969 and Phi Epsilon Pi fraternity in 1970. It has both collegiate and alumni chapters.

== Collegiate chapters ==
In the following list, active chapters are indicated in bold and inactive chapters and institutions are in italics.

Chapter	Charter date and range	Institution	Location	Status	Ref.
Home Fraternity	1898–1905	Home Fraternity		Inactive	
Alpha	1903–1971	City University of New York	New York City, New York	Inactive	(Note: Chapter formed from Omega Epsilon Phi (local) established in 1902.) (Note: Absorbed local chapters of Phi Sigma Delta and Phi Epsilon Pi as part of national mergers.)
Beta	1903–1912	Long Island Medical College		Inactive	
Gamma (First)	1904–1913	Bellevue Medical College	Manhattan, New York	Moved	(Note: Moved to New York University.)
**Delta**	1904–1971, 1976–20xx ?, 2017	Columbia University	New York City, New York	Active	
Gamma (Second)	1906–1972, 1989–1993, 2010–2026	New York University	New York City, New York	Inactive	
Zeta (First)	1907-1908	Jefferson Medical College	Philadelphia, Pennsylvania	Inactive	
Eta	1909–1935, 1969–1971, 1978–199x ?	Union College	Schenectady, New York	Inactive	
**Theta**	1907	University of Pennsylvania	Philadelphia, Pennsylvania	Active	
Iota (First)	1910–1920	Polytechnic Institute of New York University	Brooklyn, New York	Inactive	(Note: After going dormant, the chapter was reestablished in 1969 with the national merger with Phi Sigma Delta (chapter established in 1925).)
**Kappa**	1907–1982, 1989–2013, 201x ?	Cornell University	Ithaca, New York	Active	(Note: Absorbed the local chapter of Phi Epsilon Pi as part of a national merger.)
Zeta (Second)	1909–1911, 1915–1928	Case Institute of Technology	Cleveland, Ohio	Inactive	
**Lambda**	1909–Present	Case Western Reserve University	Cleveland, Ohio	Active	
**Mu (First)**	1908–1939, 1949–1957, 1969–197x ?, 1993	Boston University	Boston, Massachusetts	Active	(Note: After going dormant, the chapter reformed in 1969 from Phi Sigma Delta, established in 1921.)
**Nu**	1911–1989, 2006–200x ?, 2012–July 2020 2026–Present	Ohio State University	Columbus, Ohio	Active	(Note: Chapter absorbed the local chapter of Phi Sigma Delta as part of the national merger of the two fraternities.)
**Xi (First)**	1911–1927, 1961	Massachusetts Institute of Technology	Cambridge, Massachusetts	Active	(Note: After going format, the chapter was reformed in 1961 from the Dover Club (local), established in 1956.)
**Omicron (First)**	1911–1972, 1991	Syracuse University	Syracuse, New York	Active	
Pi	1911–1989	Louisiana State University	Baton Rouge, Louisiana	Inactive	
**Rho (First)**	1911	University of Illinois Urbana-Champaign	Champaign, Illinois	Active	(Note: Chapter formed from Waskivi (local), established in 1911.)
**Sigma**	1909–200x ?, 2013	Tulane University	New Orleans, Louisiana	Active	(Note: Chapter formed from A.M.A. (local), established in 1907. After going dormant, it reformed as a colony in 2013.)
Tau	1912–1933	Harvard University	Cambridge, Massachusetts	Inactive	
Upsilon (First)	1913–1969	McGill University	Montreal, Quebec, Canada	Inactive	
**Phi (First)**	1912–1971, 1979–2012, 2025–Present	University of Michigan	Ann Arbor, Michigan	Colony	
Chi (see Phi Epsilon)	1915–1973	University of Virginia	Charlottesville, Virginia	Inactive	
**Psi**	1916	University of Alabama	Tuscaloosa, Alabama	Active	
**Omega**	1917–199x ?, 2017	University of Missouri	Columbia, Missouri	Active	
Alpha Beta (First)	1918–1975	University of Chicago	Chicago, Illinois	Inactive	
**Alpha Gamma (First)**	1918–2012, 2015-Present	Vanderbilt University	Nashville, Tennessee	Active	
**Alpha Delta**	1918–1972, 1995	University of Southern California	Los Angeles, California	Active	(Note: Chapter formed from Delta Phi Epsilon (local), established in 1917. After going dormant, it reformed as a colony in 1982.)
Alpha Epsilon	1920–1988	Washington and Lee University	Lexington, Virginia	Inactive	(Note: Chapter formed from Gamma Gamma (local), established in 1919.)
**Alpha Zeta**	1921–1923, 1948–1956, 1970–1987, 1994–2015, 2018	University of Florida	Gainesville, Florida	Active	(Note: Chapter formed from the Maccabean Society (local), established in 1919. After going formant, it reformed in 1948 from Delta Sigma, established in 1946. In 1970, it reformed with the national merger with Phi Epsilon Pi, picking up a chapter that was originally established in 1960. It reformed again in 1992 and 2017 as a colony.)
**Alpha Eta (First)**	1921–1969, 1974–2008, 2013–2015, 2021	University of California, Berkeley	Berkeley, California	Active	(Note: Chapter reformed as a colony in 2021.)
Alpha Theta (First)	1922–1962	University of Nebraska	Lincoln, Nebraska	Inactive	(Note: Chapter formed from the Bedford Club (local), established in 1920.)
**Alpha Iota**	1942–1973	University of Kentucky	Lexington, Kentucky	Colony	(Note: Chapter formed from Gamma Tau Alpha, established in 1938.) (Note: Chapter reformed as a colony in 2021.)
**Alpha Kappa**	1922–1983, 1987	University of Wisconsin–Madison	Madison, Wisconsin	Active	(Note: Chapter formed from Octosa (local), established in 1917.)
Alpha Lambda	1921–1933	Yale University	New Haven, Connecticut	Inactive	
Alpha Mu	1923–1973, 1975–199x ?, 2008–2021	University of Washington	Seattle, Washington	Inactive	(Note: Chapter was formed from Alpha Mu Sigma (local), established in 1921. After going dormant, it reformed as a colony in 2007.)
Alpha Nu (First)	1942–1969	University of Tennessee	Knoxville, Tennessee	Inactive	
**Alpha Xi**	1923	Washington University in St. Louis	St. Louis, Missouri	Active	(Note: Chapter formed from Phi Tau (local), established in 1921.)
**Alpha Omicron (First)**	1926–19xx ?, 1983–200x ?, 2011–201x ?, 2018	University of Arizona	Tucson, Arizona	Active	
**Alpha Pi**	1927–1985, 2015–2021	University of North Carolina at Chapel Hill	Chapel Hill, North Carolina	Colony	(Note: Reformed as a colony in 2026)
**Alpha Rho**	1927	University of California, Los Angeles	Los Angeles, California	Active	(Note: Chapter formed from Pi Kappa Tau (local), established in 1925.)
Alpha Sigma (First) (see **Lambda Second**)	1931–1934, 1969–1993	University of Texas at Austin	Austin, Texas	Inactive	(Note: Chapter went dormant and later reformed as Lambda Second)
**Alpha Tau**	1931–1988, 2016–2023, 2025	Franklin & Marshall College	Lancaster, Pennsylvania	Colony	(Note: Chapter formed from Towers Club, established in 1929.)
Alpha Upsilon	1935–1971	Duke University	Durham, North Carolina	Inactive	(Note: Chapter formed from Alpha Pi Sigma, established in 1934.)
Alpha Phi (First)	1936–19xx ?, 1990–199x ?, 2012–2016	Miami University	Oxford, Ohio	Inactive	(Note: Chapter formed from Pi Theta (local), established in 1932. After going dormant, it reformed as a colony in 1989 and 2009.)
Alpha Chi	1942–1969, 1979–199x ?	University of British Columbia	British Columbia, Canada	Inactive	
**Alpha Psi**	1946–1971, 1989	Pennsylvania State University	State College, Pennsylvania	Active	(Note: Chapter formed from Gamma Sigma Phi, established in 1920. After going dormant, it reformed as a colony in 1987.)
**Alpha Omega**	1946–2020, 2023	University of Miami	Coral Gables, Florida	Active	(Note: Chapter reformed as a colony in 2022.)
**Beta Alpha Theta**	1947–1972, 1977–199x ?, 1999	University of Colorado Boulder	Boulder, Colorado	Active	(Note: Chapter formed from Beta Tau (local), established in 1946.)
**Beta Gamma**	1947	Indiana University Bloomington	Bloomington, Indiana	Active	(Note: Chapter formed from Beta Tau (local), established in 1946.)
**Beta Delta**	1947–1972, 1999	Rutgers University	New Brunswick, New Jersey	Active	(Note: Chapter formed from the Paragon Club (local), established in 1945.)
**Beta Epsilon**	1947–1971, 1992–2006, 2016–2019 2021	Michigan State University	East Lansing, Michigan	Active	(Note: Chapter formed from Sigma Zeta (local), established in 1946.)
**Beta Zeta Epsilon**	1948–1973, 1996–2009, 2015	University of Maryland, College Park	College Park, Maryland	Active	
Beta Eta	1948–200x ?	Bowling Green State University	Bowling Green, Ohio	Inactive	(Note: Chapter formed from Phi Beta Mu (local), established in 1947.)
Beta Theta	1948–1972	University of Manitoba	Winnipeg, Manitoba, Canada	Inactive	(Note: Chapter formed from Beta Tau (local), established in 1947.)
Beta Iota	1948–1953	University of Minnesota	Minneapolis, Minnesota	Inactive	(Note: Chapter formed from Delta Sigma (local), established in 1947.)
Beta Kappa	1950–1964	University of Arkansas	Fayetteville, Arkansas	Inactive	(Note: Chapter formed from Beta Tau, established in 1946.)
**Beta Lambda**	1951–1968, 1988–2016, 20xx ?	San Diego State University	San Diego, California	Active	(Note: Chapter formed from Beta Tau, established in 1949.)
Beta Mu	1957–2007	Rider University	Lawrence Township, New Jersey	Inactive	(Note: Chapter formed from Sigma Lambda Pi (local), established in 1930.)
Beta Nu	1958–1972, 1977–1990	Johns Hopkins University	Baltimore, Maryland	Inactive	(Note: Chapter formed from Beta Tau, established in 1956)
Beta Xi	1960–1973, 1991–February 2022	CUNY, Brooklyn College	Brooklyn, New York	Inactive	(Note: Chapter formed from Tau Alpha Omega (local), established in 1931.)
**Beta Pi (First)**	1960–1975, 2009	California State University, Long Beach	Long Beach, California	Active	(Note: Chapter formed from Beta Tau, established in 1958. After going dormant, it reformed as a colony in 2007.)
Beta Rho	1961–1972	New York University, Washington Square	Greenwich Village, New York	Inactive	(Note: Chapter formed from Tau Alpha Omega (local), established in 1924.)
Kappa Nu	1962–1972, 1988–2008	Rensselaer Polytechnic Institute	Troy, New York	Inactive	(Note: Chapter formed from Kappa Nu (local), established in 1918.)
Beta Upsilon	1962–1979	Youngstown State University	Youngstown, Ohio	Inactive	(Note: Chapter formed from Upsilon Upsilon (local), established in 1959.)
**Beta Phi (First)**	1962–201x ?, 2017	University of Pittsburgh	Pittsburgh, Pennsylvania	Active	(Note: Chapter formed from Kappa Nu (local), established in 1921. After going dormant, it reformed as a colony in 2015.)
**Beta Psi (First)**	1963–1994, 2017	American University	Washington, D.C.	Active	(Note: Chapter formed from Sigma Tau (local), established in 1960. After going dormant, it reformed as a colony in 2014.)
Gamma Alpha	1963–2002	Washington & Jefferson College	Washington, Pennsylvania	Inactive	(Note: Chapter formed from Iota Phi Alpha (local), established in 1956.)
**Gamma Beta (First)**	1964	California State University, Northridge	Los Angeles, California	Active	(Note: Chapter formed from Chi Delta Psi (local), established in 1962.)
Gamma Delta	1964–1990	Long Island University-CW Post	Brookville, New York	Inactive	(Note: Chapter formed from Zeta Beta, established in 1960.)
Gamma Epsilon	1965–1978	Marshall University	Huntington, West Virginia	Inactive	(Note: Chapter formed from Beta Tau (local), established in 1963.)
Gamma Zeta	1965–1972	University of Louisville	Louisville, Kentucky	Inactive	(Note: Chapters formed from Gents (local), established in 1962.)
Gamma Theta	1966–1973	CUNY, Queens College	New York City, New York	Inactive	(Note: Chapter formed from Epsilon Phi Alpha (local), established in 1963.)
Gamma Eta	1966–1973	Bradley University	Peoria, Illinois	Inactive	
Gamma Kappa	1967–1972	Adelphi College	Garden City, New York	Inactive	(Note: Chapter formed from Delta Phi Gamma (local), established in 1947.)
Gamma Iota	1967–1971, 199x ?–199x?	Western Michigan University	Kalamazoo, Michigan	Inactive	(Note: Chapter formed from Beta Tau, established in 1964.)
Gamma Lambda	1967–1971, 1985–19xx ?, 1997–200x ?, 2009–20xx ?	University of Hartford	West Hartford, Connecticut	Inactive	(Note: Chapter formed from Beta Tau, established in 1966.)
**Gamma Mu**	1967–1976, 2009	University of Memphis	Memphis, Tennessee	Active	
**Gamma Nu**	1968–200x ?, 2017	California State University, Los Angeles	Los Angeles, California	Active	(Note: Chapter formed from Phi Alpha Pi (local), established in 1965.)
**Gamma Xi**	1968–1992, 2016	University of California, Santa Barbara	Santa Barbara, California	Active	(Note: Chapter formed from Beta Tau, established in 1967.)
Gamma Omicron	1968–1972	University of Wisconsin–Milwaukee	Milwaukee, Wisconsin	Inactive	
Gamma Pi	1969–199x ?	University of Rochester	Rochester, New York	Inactive	(Note: Chapter formed from Alpha Kappa Phi (local), established in 1964.)
Gamma Rho	1969–1972	Eastern New Mexico University	Portales, New Mexico	Inactive	(Note: Chapter formed from Alpha Beta Tau (local), established in 1965.)
Gamma Sigma	1969–1979	Lamar University	Beaumont, Texas	Inactive	(Note: Chapter formed from Beta Tau, established in 1965.)
**Gamma Tau**	1969–1974, 1991–199x ?, 2015	Arizona State University	Tempe, Arizona	Active	
Gamma Upsilon	1969–1973	University of Louisiana at Monroe	Monroe, Louisiana	Inactive	
Gamma Phi	1969–2008	Hofstra University	Nassau County, New York	Inactive	(Note: Chapter formed from Sigma Alpha Lambda (local), established in 1941.)
**Gamma Chi**	1969–1972, 1986–1997, 2010	University of South Florida	Tampa, Florida	Active	
**Gamma Psi**	1969–1984, 1989–1993, 201x ?	Northeastern University	Boston, Massachusetts	Active	(Note: Chapter formed from Nu Sigma Pi (local), established in 1965. After going formant, it reformed as a colony in 1988 and 2012.)
**Gamma Omega**	1969–1975	Northern Illinois University	DeKalb, Illinois	Inactive	(Note: Chapter formed from Tau Gamma (local), established in 1967.)
**Phi Alpha Alpha**	1969–197x ?, 1974–1993, 2010	George Washington University	Washington, D.C.	Active	(Note: Chapter formed from Phi Sigma Delta, established in 1914. After going dormant, it reformed as a colony in 2007.)
**Iota (Second)**	1969–1990, 2007	University of Denver	Denver, Colorado	Active	(Note: 1920 Chapter formed from Phi Sigma Delta, established in 1920. After going dormant, it reformed as a colony in 2005.)
Rho (Second)	1969–1972	University of Richmond	Richmond, Virginia	Inactive	(Note: Chapter formed from Phi Sigma Delta, established in 1925.)
Upsilon (Second)	1969–1978	West Virginia University	Morgantown, West Virginia	Inactive	(Note: Chapter formed from Phi Sigma Delta, established in 1927.)
Phi (Second)	1969–1995	Duquesne University	Pittsburgh, Pennsylvania	Inactive	
Zeta Rho	1969–1970, 1995–200x ?	University of Vermont	Burlington, Vermont	Inactive	(Note: Chapter formed from Phi Sigma Delta, established in 1928.)
Alpha Beta (Second) (see Eta Nu)	1969–1972, 1974–199x ?	Temple University	Philadelphia, Pennsylvania	Inactive	(Note: Chapter formed from Phi Sigma Delta, established in 1929. Later, it went dormant and reformed as Eta Nu.)
Alpha Gamma (Second)	1969–1970	Wayne State University	Detroit, Michigan	Inactive	(Note: Chapter formed from Phi Sigma Delta, established in 1930.)
Alpha Eta (Second)	1969–1975	Colorado State University	Fort Collins, Colorado	Inactive	(Note: Chapter formed from Phi Sigma Delta, established in 1952.)
**Theta Alpha**	1969–1972, 1999–200x ?, 2014	University of Massachusetts Amherst	Amherst, Massachusetts	Active	(Note: Chapter formed from Phi Sigma Delta, established in 1957. After going dormant, it reformed as a colony in 1998 and 2011.)
Alpha Omicron (Second)	1969–1971	Pratt Institute	Brooklyn, New York	Inactive	(Note: Chapter formed from Phi Sigma Delta, established in 1959.)
**Rho Iota**	1969–19xx ?, 2001	University of Rhode Island	Kingston, Rhode Island	Active	(Note: Chapter formed from Phi Sigma Delta, established in 1963.)
Alpha Phi (Second)	1969–1972	Parsons College	Fairfield, Iowa	Inactive	(Note: Chapter formed from Phi Sigma Delta, established in 1965.)
Zeta Tau	1969–1989, 1997–2014	Seton Hall University	South Orange, New Jersey	Inactive	(Note: Chapter formed from Phi Sigma Delta, established in 1968.)
Delta Alpha	1970–1971	Kent State University	Kent, Ohio	Inactive	
Delta Beta	1970–1971, 200x ?–July 2020	University of Connecticut	Storrs, Connecticut	Inactive	(Note: Chapter formed from Phi Sigma Delta, established in 1943. After going dormant, it reformed as a colony in 2006.)
Delta Gamma	1970–1972, 199x ?–200?	University of Oklahoma	Norman, Oklahoma	Inactive	(Note: Chapter formed from Phi Beta Delta, established in 1922.)
Delta Zeta	1970–1972	Rutgers University–Newark	Newark, New Jersey	Inactive	
Delta Theta	1970–1973, 19xx ?–1989	University of Charleston	Charleston, West Virginia	Inactive	
Delta Iota	1970–1975	University of Wisconsin–Oshkosh	Oshkosh, Wisconsin	Inactive	
Iota (Third)	1970–1985	Dickinson College	Carlisle, Pennsylvania	Inactive	(Note: Chapter formed from Phi Epsilon Pi, established in 1914.)
**Mu (Second)**	1970–1985, 2001–2004, 2013–2018, 2025–Present	University of Georgia	Athens, Georgia	Colony	(Note: Chapter formed from Phi Epsilon Pi Mu, established in 1915. After going dormant, it reformed in 2010 as a colony.)
Xi (Second)	1970–1998, 2009–2023	Georgia Institute of Technology	Atlanta, Georgia	Inactive	(Note: Chapter formed from Phi Epsilon Pi, established in 1916.)
**Omicron (Second)**	1970–19xx ?, 1989	Tufts University	Medford, Massachusetts	Active	
**Gamma (Third)**	1970–1972, 1976	Northwestern University	Evanston, Illinois	Active	(Note: Chapter formed from Phi Epsilon Pi, established in 1920.)
Alpha Beta (Third)	1970–1971	University of Iowa	Iowa City, Iowa	Inactive	
Alpha Theta (Second)	1970–199x ?	University of South Carolina	Columbia, South Carolina	Inactive	(Note: Chapter formed from Phi Epsilon Pi, established in 1928.)
**Alpha Nu (Second)**	1970–1995, 2017	Muhlenberg College	Allentown, Pennsylvania	Active	(Note: Chapter formed from Phi Epsilon Pi, established in 1932. After going dormant, it reformed as a colony in 2015.)
Kappa Phi	1970–19xx ?, 1993–2002	Alfred University	Alfred, New York	Inactive	(Note: Chapter formed from Phi Epsilon Pi, established in 1933. After going dormant, it reformed as a colony in 1991.)
Alpha Sigma (Second)	1970–1985	University of Mississippi	Oxford, Mississippi	Inactive	(Note: Chapter formed from Phi Epsilon Pi, established in 1935.)
Beta Zeta	1970–1983	Philadelphia University	Philadelphia, Pennsylvania	Inactive	(Note: Chapter formed from Phi Epsilon Pi, established in 1961)
Beta Pi (Second)	1970–1980	Western New England College	Springfield, Massachusetts	Inactive	(Note: Chapter formed from Phi Epsilon Pi, established in 1967.)
Beta Tau	1970–1988	Widener College	Chester, Pennsylvania	Inactive	(Note: Chapter formed from Phi Epsilon Pi, established in 1968.)
Beta Phi (Second)	1970–1973	West Chester University	West Chester, Pennsylvania	Inactive	
Beta Psi (Second)	1970–1976	Drake University	Des Moines, Iowa	Inactive	(Note: Chapter formed from Phi Epsilon Pi, established in 1969.)
Gamma Beta (Second)	1970–199x ?	University of New Haven	West Haven, Connecticut	Inactive	
Delta Kappa	1971–1986	Purdue University-Calumet	Hammond, Indiana	Inactive	
**Delta Lambda**	1971	Monmouth College	Monmouth, Illinois	Active	
Delta Mu	1971–1973	University of Wisconsin–Superior	Superior, Wisconsin	Inactive	(Note: Chapter formed from Theta Alpha Chi, established in 1968.)
Delta Nu	1971–1978	Southampton College of LIU	Shinnecock Hills, New York	Active	
**Delta Xi**	1972–1983, 1994–200x ?, 2021	Virginia Tech	Blacksburg, Virginia	Active	
**Delta Omicron**	1972–1984, 2014	University of Tampa	Tampa, Florida	Active	
**Delta Pi**	1972–200x, 2016–202x	Fairleigh Dickinson University Metropolitan Campus	Teaneck, New Jersey	Inactive	
Delta Rho	1973–1975	Monmouth University	West Long Branch, New Jersey	Inactive	
Delta Sigma	1973–1983	Marquette University	Milwaukee, Wisconsin	Inactive	
Delta Tau	1974–1983, 2009–2010	Carnegie Mellon University	Pittsburgh, Pennsylvania	Inactive	(Note: Chapter formed from Tau Delta Phi, established in 1929. After going dormant, it reformed as a colony in 2006.)
Delta Upsilon	1975–1989	College of New Jersey	Ewing Township, New Jersey	Inactive	(Note: Chapter formed from Phi Epsilon Kappa, established in 1924.)
Delta Phi	1976–1982	La Salle University	Philadelphia, Pennsylvania	Inactive	
Delta Chi	1976–199x ?	Bentley College	Waltham, Massachusetts	Inactive	
Delta Omega	1978–199x ?	Babson College	Wellesley, Massachusetts	Inactive	
Delta Psi	1977–2010	Stony Brook University	Stony Brook, New York	Inactive	
Epsilon Alpha	1978–1983	Oregon Institute of Technology	Klamath Falls, Oregon	Inactive	
Zeta (Third)	1980–2002, 201x ?–2016	State University of New York at Buffalo	Buffalo, New York	Inactive	
Epsilon Zeta	1980–1985	Keene State College	Keene, New Hampshire	Inactive	
Kappa Nu	1980–199x ?	University of San Francisco	San Francisco, California	Inactive	
**Epsilon Theta**	1982	University of Delaware	Newark, Delaware	Active	
Epsilon Eta	1983–1989	Rowan University	Glassboro, New Jersey	Inactive	
Epsilon Kappa	1983–1988	East Carolina University	Greenville, North Carolina	Inactive	
Epsilon Lambda	1983–1985	East Carolina State University ?		Inactive	
Epsilon Omega	1983–1985, 199x ?–199x?	State University of New York at Cortland	Cortland, New York	Inactive	
Epsilon Sigma	1983–1988, 1995–200x ?	William Paterson University	Wayne, New Jersey	Inactive	
**Epsilon Mu**	1984–199x ?, 2010	University of Kansas	Lawrence, Kansas	Active	
Epsilon Omicron	1984–1992	Fairleigh Dickinson University, Rutherford	Rutherford, New Jersey	Inactive	
**Epsilon Tau**	1984	Fairleigh Dickinson University, Florham	Madison, New Jersey	Active	
Epsilon Beta	1985–199x?	University of California, San Diego	San Diego, California	Inactive	
Epsilon Gamma	1986–200x ?, 2015–September 2020	University at Albany, SUNY	Albany, New York	Inactive	
**Epsilon Delta**	1987–199x ?, 2010–2012, 2019	State University of New York at Binghamton	Binghamton, New York	Active	
Epsilon Iota	1987–199x ?	CUNY, Hunter College	Manhattan, New York	Inactive	
**Epsilon Nu**	1988–1989, 2013	State University of New York at Oneonta	Oneonta, New York	Active	
**Epsilon Phi**	1988–1989, 199x ?–199x ?, 2007	Brandeis University	Waltham, Massachusetts	Active	(Note: Brandeis does not officially recognize or permit fraternities)
**Beta Alpha Chi**	1989	York College of Pennsylvania	Spring Garden Township, Pennsylvania	Active	(Note: Chapter formed from Beta Alpha Chi (local), established in 1986.)
Epsilon Chi	1989–199x ?	University of California, Davis	Davis, California	Inactive	
Epsilon Psi	1989–199x ?	Montclair State University	Montclair, New Jersey	Inactive	
**Zeta Alpha**	1990–200x ?, 2012–2017, 2023	Florida State University	Tallahassee, Florida	Active	
Zeta Delta	1990–January 2021	Ramapo College	Mahwah, New Jersey	Inactive	
Zeta Gamma	1990–199x ?	Texas A&M University	College Station, Texas	Inactive	
Zeta Epsilon	1990–2003	Penn State Erie, The Behrend College	Erie, Pennsylvania	Inactive	
**Zeta Eta**	1991–1994, 2018	University of Western Ontario	London, Ontario, Canada	Active	
Zeta Theta	1991–August 2022	Western Connecticut State University	Danbury, Connecticut	Inactive	
Zeta Iota	1991–1994	State University of New York at New Paltz	New Paltz, New York	Inactive	
Zeta Kappa	1991–200x ?	University of Maryland, Baltimore County	Catonsville, Maryland	Inactive	
**Zeta Lambda**	1991–200x ?	Stephen F. Austin University	Nacogdoches, Texas	Colony	
Zeta Nu	1992–200x ?	Johnson & Wales University	Providence, Rhode Island	Inactive	
Zeta Xi	1992-202x?	Gannon University	Erie, Pennsylvania	Inactive	
Zeta Omicron	1992–2009	Stockton University	Galloway Township, New Jersey	Inactive	
Phi Epsilon (see Chi)	1992–2016	University of Virginia	Charlottesville, Virginia	Inactive	(Note: The dormant UVA chapter was reestablished with the national merger with Phi Epsilon Pi.)
Zeta Pi	1993–200x ?	East Stroudsburg University	East Stroudsburg, Pennsylvania	Inactive	
Phi Delta Psi	1996–2004	Southern New Hampshire University	Manchester and Hooksett, New Hampshire	Inactive	(Note: Chapter formed from Phi Delta Psi, established in 1966.)
Zeta Sigma	1997–200x ?	Princeton University	Princeton, New Jersey	Inactive	
Zeta Upsilon	1997–200x ?	University of Texas at Dallas	Richardson, Texas	Inactive	
Zeta Phi	1997–2007	Ball State University	Muncie, Indiana	Inactive	
Zeta Chi	1998–200x ?	St. John's University, Staten Island	Staten Island, New York	Inactive	
Zeta Psi	1998–200x ?	Kean University	New Jersey	Inactive	
Zeta Omega	1999–200x ?	James Madison University	Harrisonburg, Virginia	Inactive	(Note: Chapter formed from Beta Tau (local), established in 1998.)
**Phi Theta Gamma**	1999	Lyon College	Batesville, Arkansas	Active	(Note: Chapter formed from Phi Theta Gamma, established in 1996.)
Eta Alpha	1999–200x ?	Clemson University	Clemson, South Carolina	Inactive	
**Lambda (Second)**(see Alpha Sigma First)	200x ?	University of Texas at Austin	Austin, Texas	Active	
Eta Beta	2001–200x ?	Oklahoma State University–Stillwater	Stillwater, Oklahoma	Inactive	
Eta Gamma	2001–September 2019	State University of New York at Oswego	Oswego, New York	Inactive	
Eta Delta	2002–201x ?	University of Nevada, Las Vegas	Paradise, Nevada	Inactive	
Eta Zeta	200x ?–201x ?	California State University, Chico	Chico, California	Inactive	
**Eta Iota**	200x ?–200x ?, 2007	State University of New York at Plattsburgh	Plattsburgh, New York	Active	
**Eta Kappa**	2007–2013, 2016	Towson University	Towson, Maryland	Active	
**Eta Lambda**	2007–2017, 2023	Emory University	Atlanta, Georgia	Active	
Delta Zeta	2009-December 2025	Pace University	New York City, New York	Inactive	
**Delta Iota**	2009	University of Central Florida	Orlando, Florida	Active	
Delta Eta	2009–January 2022	Lynn University	Boca Raton, Florida	Inactive	
**Alpha Alpha**	2008	Purdue University	West Lafayette, Indiana	Active	
**Eta Mu**	2012	California Polytechnic State University, San Luis Obispo	San Luis Obispo, California	Active	
Eta Nu (see Alpha Beta Second)	2012–201x ?	Temple University	Philadelphia, Pennsylvania	Inactive	
**Eta Xi**	2013	University of North Carolina at Charlotte	Charlotte, North Carolina	Active	
**Eta Omicron**	2014	Quinnipiac University	Hamden, Connecticut	Active	
Eta Rho	2015–2024	Florida International University	Miami, Florida	Inactive	
**Eta Sigma**	2015	Elon University	Elon, North Carolina.	Active	
**Eta Tau** (see Alpha Beta Third)	2017	University of Iowa	Iowa City, Iowa	Active	
**Eta Upsilon**	2016	Santa Clara University	Santa Clara, California	Active	
Eta Phi	2019–2025	College of Charleston	Charleston, South Carolina	Inactive	
		Bucknell University	Lewisburg, Pennsylvania	Colony	(Note: Formed as a colony in 2025.)
		Kennesaw State University	Kennesaw, Georgia	Colony	(Note: Formed as a colony in 2025.)
		Loyola University Chicago	Chicago, Illinois	Colony	(Note: Formed as a colony in 2025.)

== Alumni chapters ==
In the following list, active chapters are indicated in bold and inactive chapters and institutions are in italics.

Chapter	Location	Status	Ref.
Atlanta Area Alumni Association	Atlanta, Georgia	Active	
Boston Area Alumni Association	Boston, Massachusetts	Active	
Chicago Area Alumni Association	Chicago, Illinois	Active	
Greater Washington D.C. Area Alumni Association	Washington, D.C.	Active	
New York City Area Alumni Association	New York City, New York	Active	
South Florida Area Alumni Association	Miami, Florida	Active	
Southern California Area Alumni Association	Los Angeles, California	Active	
