= Avraham Yitzhak =

- אברהם יצחק
- Born: 1973 (age 52–53); Addis Ababa
- Education: Ben-Gurion University of the Negev
- Military career
- Allegiance: Israel
- Branch: Israel Defense Forces
- Rank: Colonel
- Commands: Medical Officer, 101st Battalion of the Paratroopers Brigade; Medical Officer of Maglan Unit; Medical Officer of the Nahal Brigade; Head of Medical Section, Southern Command; Medical Officer of the Gaza Division; Head of Operational Medicine Branch, Medical Corps; Commander of Medical Services, Southern Command
- Conflicts: Second Lebanon War; Operation Cast Lead; Operation Pillar of Defense; Operation Protective Edge

Avraham (Avi) Yitzhak (born 1973) is an Israeli physician and surgeon, currently serving as the medical director of Assuta Hospital in Beersheba. He previously served as the chief medical officer of the Israel Fire and Rescue Services. A reserve officer in the Israel Defense Forces (IDF) with the rank of colonel, he served, among other roles, as commander of medical services for the Southern Command, head of the Operational Medicine Branch in the Medical Corps, medical officer of the Gaza Division, Head of the Medical Section in Southern Command, medical officer of the Nahal Brigade, and medical officer of the Maglan Unit.

Itzhak was the first medical student in Israel of Ethiopian descent and, as of 2017, the highest-ranking IDF officer of Ethiopian origin. He was selected to light a torch at the 62nd Israeli Independence Day ceremony in 2010 as a representative of the IDF. He saved the lives of dozens of IDF soldiers during the Second Lebanon War, Operation Cast Lead, and additional military operations.

== Biography ==
Yitzhak was born in Addis Ababa, Ethiopia, the second of four children of Rachamim and Kasach Itzhak. His father was an emissary of a Zionist organization who worked to facilitate the immigration of Ethiopian Jews to Israel via Sudan, and his mother was a teacher.

A gifted student, Itzhak began studying medicine at Addis Ababa University at the age of 15 in 1988. At age 18, in 1991, he fled Ethiopia to avoid conscription into the Ethiopian army during the Ethiopian Civil War and immigrated to Israel. One year later, he was accepted into medical school at Ben-Gurion University of the Negev in Beersheba as part of the Academic Reserve program, becoming the first Ethiopian-born medical student in Israel.

After completing his medical studies, he began his service in the IDF, graduating from the Officer Training Course at Bahad 1 with distinction. He initially served for about two years as a battalion physician in the 101st Battalion of the Paratroopers Brigade, followed by about two years as the physician of the Maglan Unit, participating in Operation Defensive Shield and other missions.

In 2004, he began his surgery residency at Soroka Medical Center in Beersheba, but it was interrupted by the outbreak of the Second Lebanon War. During the war, he served as a physician with the Nahal Brigade, participated in the Battle of the Saluki, and was wounded 12 hours before the end of the war.

After completing his surgical residency, Itzhak was appointed Head of the Medical Section in Southern Command. In 2012, he became medical officer of the Gaza Division, where he participated in Operation Pillar of Defense and saved under fire the life of Lieutenant Colonel (res.) Gil Siton.

From 2015, he served as head of the Operational Medicine Branch with the rank of lieutenant colonel. In November 2017, he was promoted to colonel and assumed the role of commander of medical services for the Southern Command.

Alongside his military service, Itzhak earned a master's degree in health systems management from Ben-Gurion University and is a graduate of the prestigious Inbar leadership program for Israel's healthcare system.

In November 2020, he received the Minister of Aliyah and Integration Award for 2020. After completing his IDF service, he joined the Israel Fire and Rescue Services, serving as its chief medical officer.

In February 2023, he was appointed the director of Assuta Hospital Beersheba.

== Personal life ==
Itzhak has been married since 1997 to Gannet, whom he met during his studies at Ben-Gurion University (she studied social work). They live in Beersheba and have five children. As of 2017, their eldest son serves in the Golani Brigade. Their second daughter, Inbal, is expected to enlist as a combat soldier.
