= Baruch Tegegne =

Ethiopian leader (1944–2010)

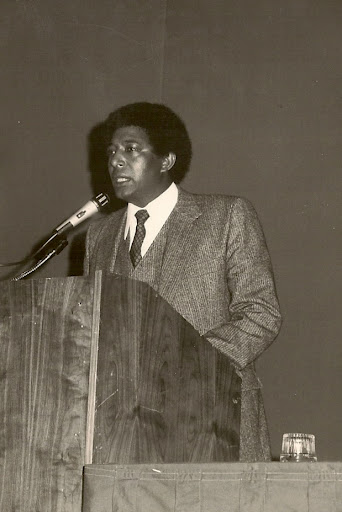
Tegegne in the AAEJ National Conference, 1983

Baruch Tegegne (23 January 1944 – 27 December 2010) was a prominent leader of Ethiopian Jews in Israel and advocate of their immigration in the 1980s and 1990s. He lived in Israel.

== Early life ==
Tegegne was born in a small Jewish village of 200 families in 1944. In 1955 he journeyed to Israel where he remained until 1963. In the 1960s, through the outbreak of the Ethiopian Civil war in 1974, when the Derg came to power and after the death of Emperor Haile Selassie, he was engaged in various business and agronomist activities, including setting up a communal farm for Ethiopian Jews on the border with Sudan. He journeyed as a refugee to Sudan and then on to Nigeria in 1975 and finally to Israel in 1976.

== Political activism ==
Tegegne led a protest march in 1977 in Jerusalem that gained him recognition from Menachem Begin. He served in the Israel Defense Forces and worked with the Mossad in the late 1970s. In 1979, he appeared before the General Assembly of the United Jewish Communities. He also sought support from the American Association for Ethiopian Jews. He was married in 1980 to Susan Migicovsky and had a daughter named Yaffa. Beginning in 1980, Tegegne was involved in efforts to bring Ethiopian Jews to Germany and then to Canada. He met with Elie Wiesel and in 1984 led further protests in Israel and another in 1987. Although not directly involved, he was credited with raising the awareness that led to Operation Moses and Operation Solomon.

== Later life ==
Tegegne died in 2010 aged 66.
