= Raphael Hadane =

Israeli high priest (1923–2020)

Raphael Hadane ራፋኤል ሀዴኔ
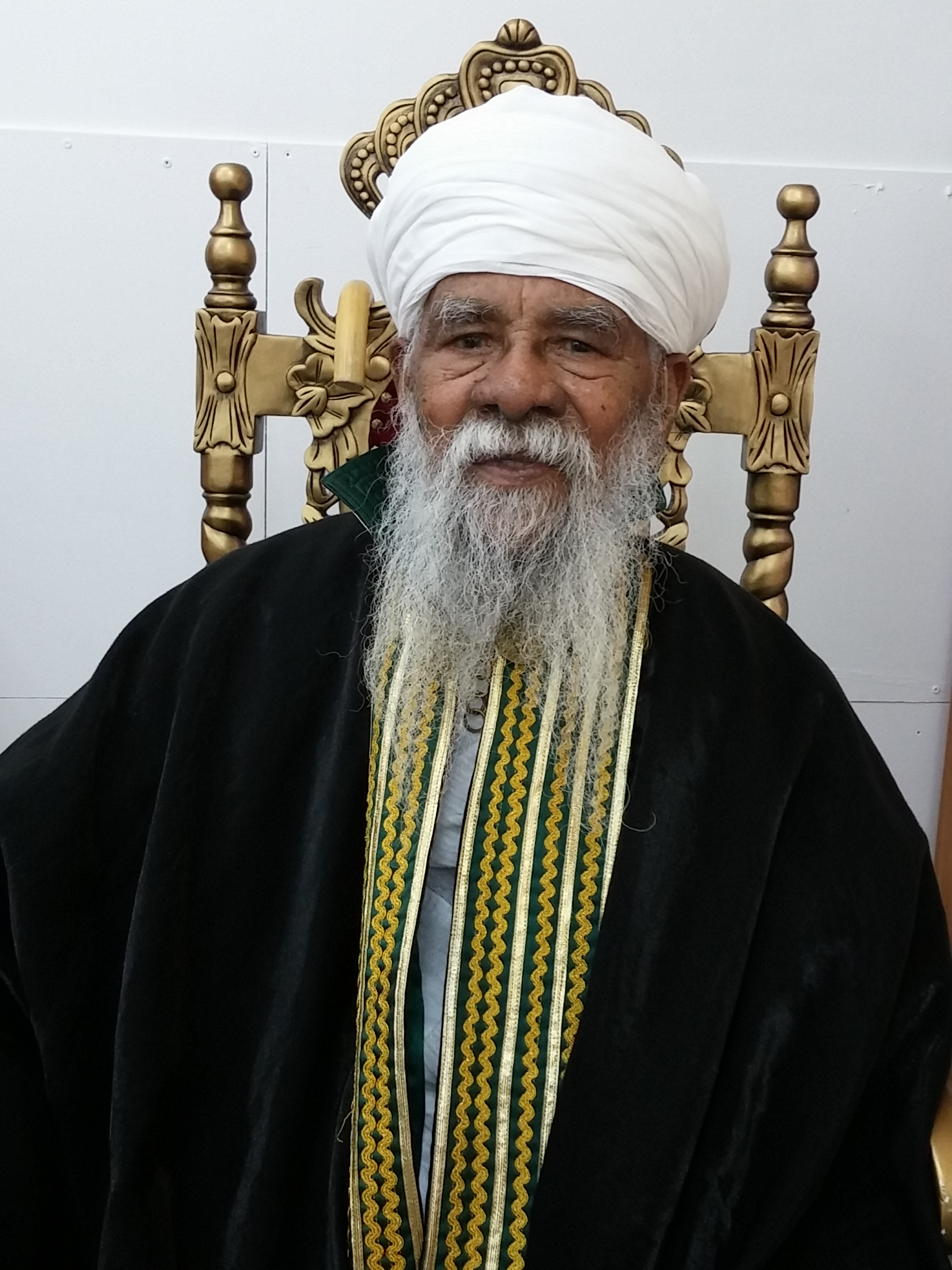
- Title: Liqa Kahnat

Personal life
- Born: Hadana Takoya; August 12, 1923 Seqelt, Ethiopian Empire
- Died: November 8, 2020 (aged 97)
- Children: Yosef Hadane; 10 others

Religious life
- Religion: Judaism

Raphael Hadane (Hebrew: רפאל הדנה, Amharic: ራፋኤል ሀዴኔ; 12 August 1923 – 8 November 2020), also known as Hadana Takoya, was the Liqa Kahenat (High priest) of Beta Israel in Israel.

== Biography ==
Hadane was born in Seqelt, Ethiopia and studied with the Qessim as a child. During the Italian occupation of Ethiopia, he had moved to Ambober where he worked as a farmer. He studied Hebrew briefly in 1955 when an Israeli rabbi taught in Asmara. In 1985 Qes Adana immigrated to Israel along with his wife and eleven children.

Hadane argued for the acceptance of the Falasha Mura as Jews. At a ceremony in 1994 marking the 10th anniversary of Operation Moses, Hadane recited the Yizkor prayer in Hebrew and Amharic in memory of 4,000 members of the community who died while fleeing to Sudan (those who reached the Sudan were flown to Israel).

Hadane died on 8 November 2020 at the age of 97.

== See also ==
- Ethiopian Jews in Israel
- Religion in Israel
