= American Association for Ethiopian Jews =

American Association for Ethiopian Jews (AAEJ) was a Jewish-American organization that was active between 1974 and 1993 for the purpose of realizing the Aliyah of Beta Israel to Israel. The organization's contribution to the Aliyah of the Beta Israel was significant.

== History ==
Upon his return from Ethiopia to the U.S in 1969, peace activist Jed Abraham founded the "Friends of the Beta Israel Community" organization, and in 1974 it was merged with "American Pro-Falasha Committee (APFC)", that was headed by Martin Wurmbrand. Together they created the "American Association for Ethiopian Jews". It was headed by Graenum Berger.

When it became clear that most Ethiopian Jews had made Aliyah to Israel, the Executive Council decided in 1993 to end the organization's activities. A year later several of its members founded the "Israel Association for Ethiopian Jews" Voluntary association. In 1998, Nate Shapiro, William Recant, Susan Pollack, Barbara Gaffin, Brett Goldberg and Gerald Frim founded the "Friends of Ethiopian Jews" organization to help the Ethiopian Jewish community in Israel by supporting programs for education, employment, advocacy, community development and civil rights.

== Presidents ==
- Graenum Berger (1974-1978)
- Howard Lenhoff (1978-1983)
- Nate Shapiro (1983-1993)

Other activists

- Henry Rosenberg
- Barbara Gaffin
- Susan Pollack
- LaDena Schnapper
- William Recant
- Brett Goldberg
- Bill Halpern
