= Kahen =

Beta Israel priest role

Kahen or Kohane (Ge'ez: ካህን kahən "priest", plural ካህናት kahənat) is a religious role in Beta Israel second only to the monk or falasyan. Their duty is to maintain and preserve the Haymanot among the people. This has become more difficult by the people's encounter with the modernity of Israel, where most of the Ethiopian Jewish people now live.

The high priest (ሊቀ ካህን liqa kahən, plural ሊቃነ ካህናት liqanä kahhənat) is the leader of the priests in a certain area.

An aspiring kahen must spend time studying as a debtera before being ordained. As a debtera, he will be closer to the laypeople and serve as an intermediary between them and the clergy. Upon becoming a kahen, he will no longer perform the services of a debtera, though he may take them up again if he gives up his position or is deposed.

The term qäsis (Ge'ez: ቀሲስ, Amharic: ቄስ qes; Tigrinya: ቀሺ qäši), which refers to married priest in the Ethiopian and Eritrean Orthodox Tewahedo Churches, is a synonym for kahen, an unmarried priest, among the Beta Israel. With the aliyah of Beta Israel to Israel, the Amharic "qes" Hebraized was translated as Kes (Hebrew: קס or קייס, plural קסים or קייסים Kesim).

== Notable priests ==
- Liqa Kahenat Berhan Baruch (1910–1984) – main leader of the Beta Israel from the Italian occupation until his death.
- Liqa Kahenat Isaac Yaso (1892–1997) – main leader of the Jews in Tigray.
- Liqa Kahenat Raphael Hadane (1923–2020) – religious leader of the Jews in Ambover.
- Kes Avihu Azariya – head of the council of Ethiopian High Priests.

== See also ==
- Debtera
