= Yona Bogale =

Ethiopian Jewish educator (1908–1987)

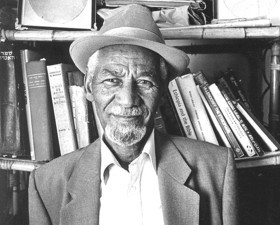
- Born: 1908; Wolleqa, Ethiopia
- Died: 1987 (aged 78–79); Petah Tikva, Israel
- Other name: Yona Bogale (Naftali)
- Known for: Iconic Ethiopian Jewish Leader; architect of aliyah and educational, medical, agricultural and religious development for Beta Israelis; prolific author, translator and publisher; recipient of Israel's Oat Hanegid Award
- Year of Aliyah: 1979

Yona Bogale (Hebrew: יונה בוגלה; 1908–1987) was an Ethiopian Jewish educator and public figure, who served as the director of the Beta Israel education network in Ethiopia and worked vigorously for the immigration of Ethiopian Jews to Israel. He led the efforts to improve the living conditions of the Beta Israel in Ethiopia by expanding education, providing medical facilities, increasing agricultural production and promoting religious freedom. His persistence in the face of opposition enabled many thousands of his people to fulfill their lifelong dream of Aliyah, or return to the homeland of Israel.

== Biography ==
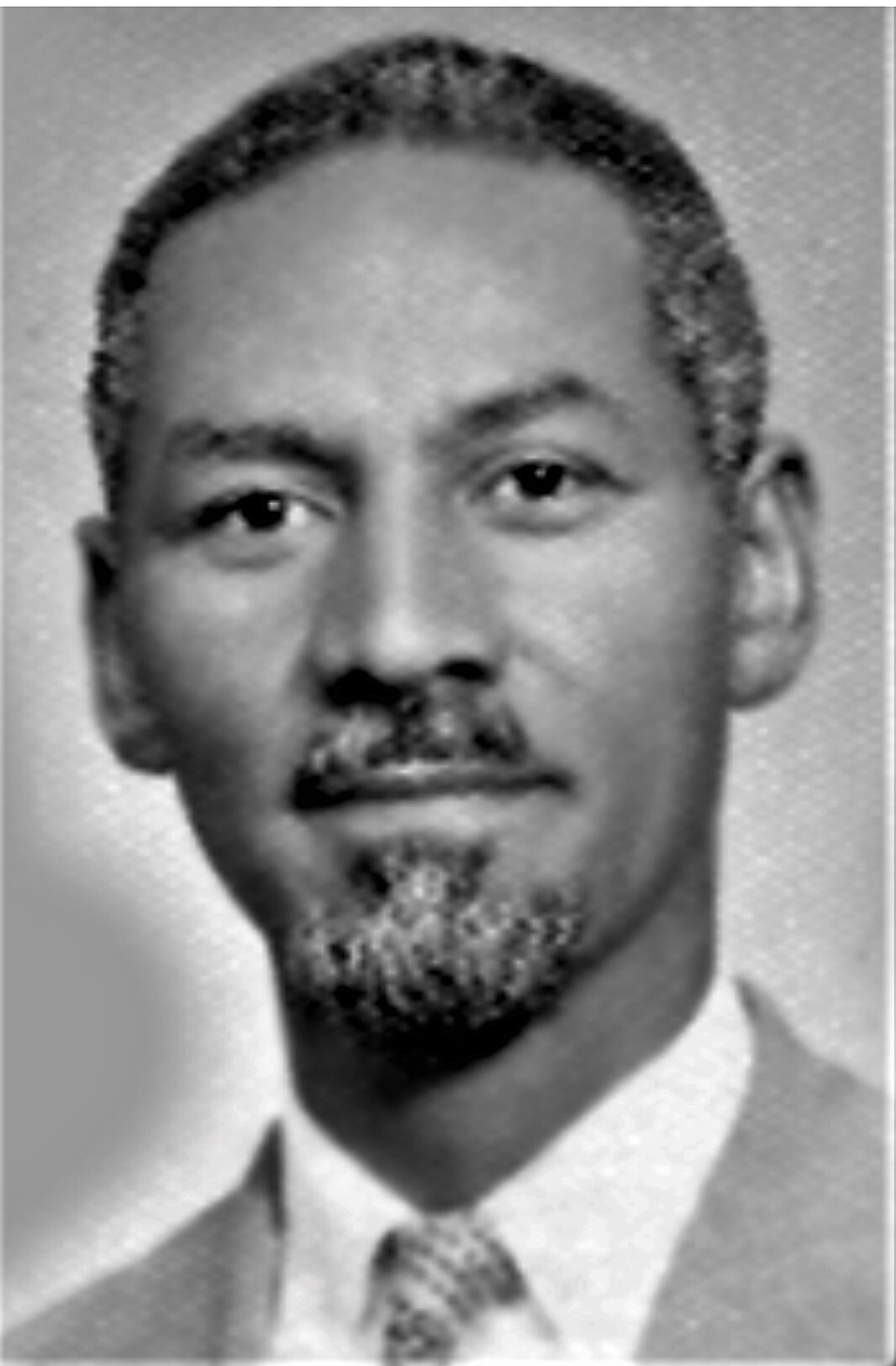
Yona Bogale, Age 46, after returning from Israel and Europe to teach and work in Ethiopia

Yona Bogale was born in 1908 in the rural village of Wolleqa, near Gondar in Northern Ethiopia, The eldest of five children of Bogale Birru and Beletu Reda, he was raised in a family of farmers and goat and cattle herders, but showed an early aptitude for language and education. With the help of Dr. Jacob (Jacques) Faitlovitch and Professor Tamrat Emmanuel, he completed his primary studies, and at the age of 12, and was one of several young people selected to study abroad. After attending elementary school in Jerusalem for four years, he spent two years in high school in Frankfurt, Germany. He attended the University of Heidelberg in Germany for two years and completed his international studies at the Asher Institute for Jewish Education in Lausanne, Switzerland, and the Alliance Francaise Universelle in Paris, France. After returning to Addis Ababa in 1932, he taught in the teacher training and boarding school opened there by Faitlovitch, eventually becoming its principal. From 1935, Bogale served as a translator for the Ethiopian Red Cross at the time of the Italian invasion and occupation of Ethiopia. Afterwards, he returned to work in several private businesses, before being appointed in 1941 to a position in the Ethiopian government by King Hailie Selassie I. In 1945, he married Tayitu Kelkele and began a union that spanned 45 years and produced eight children. After Ethiopia gained its independence, Bogale worked as head of the translation department in the Ethiopian Ministry of Education for twelve years. Then, with the cooperation of the Jewish Agency, Sochnut Hayhudit, Bogale opened and supervised more than 20 Jewish schools in Ethiopia. In the wake of Faitlovitch's death. in 1955, Bogale and Tamrat Emmanuel became the lead advocates for the Beta Israel community. For the next two decades, he was the driving force in opening new schools, medical facilities, prayer houses and agricultural stations in the northwestern part of Ethiopia. His work drew the attention of religious leaders and government officials in Israel, as well as Jewish organizations worldwide, particularly with regard to his goal of aliyah for all Ethiopian Jews.

== Quest for Aliyah ==
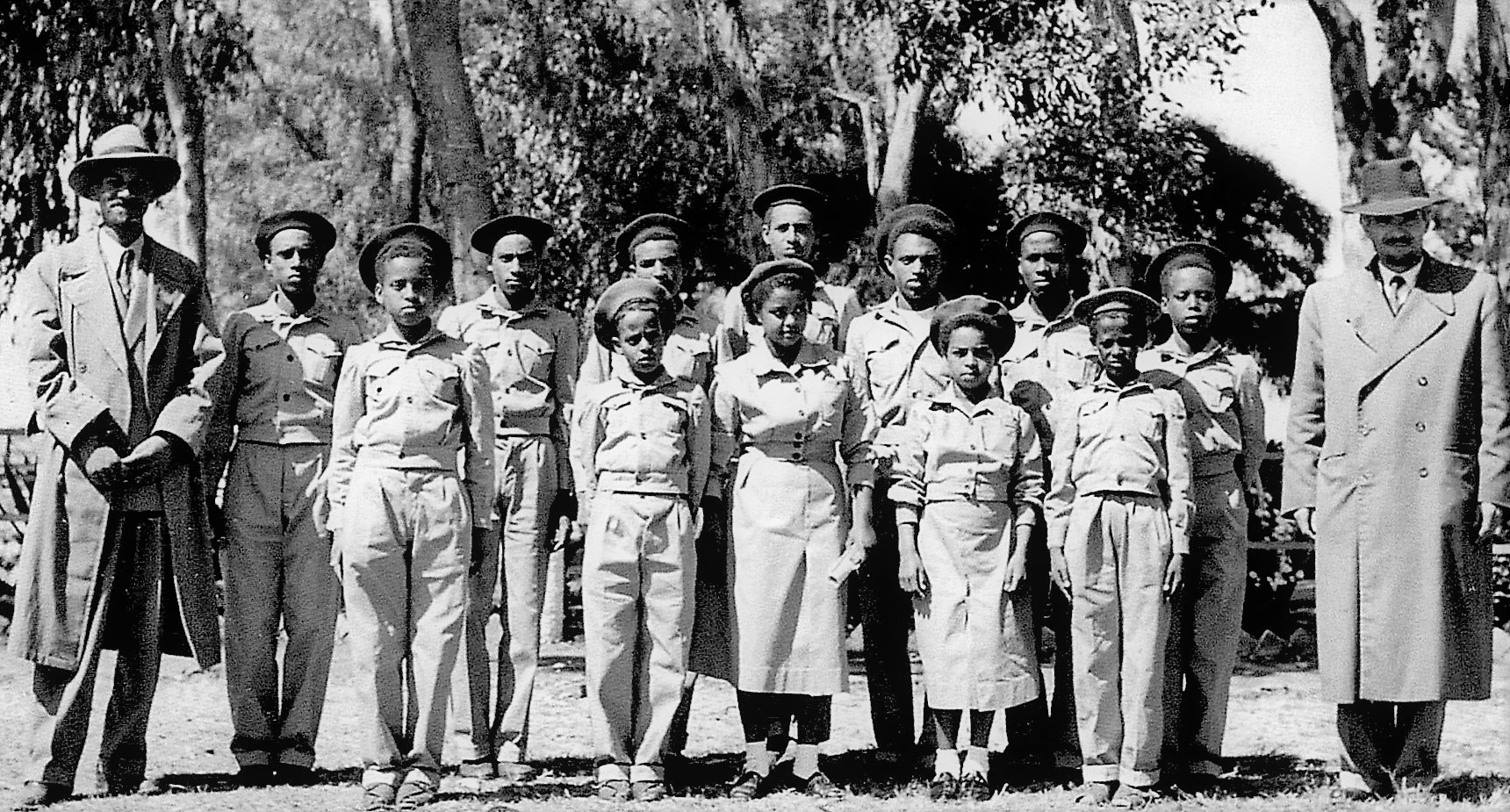
Yona Bogale (far left) and Rabbi Joseph Beeri join a group of students at the Asmara School before their departure for Israel.

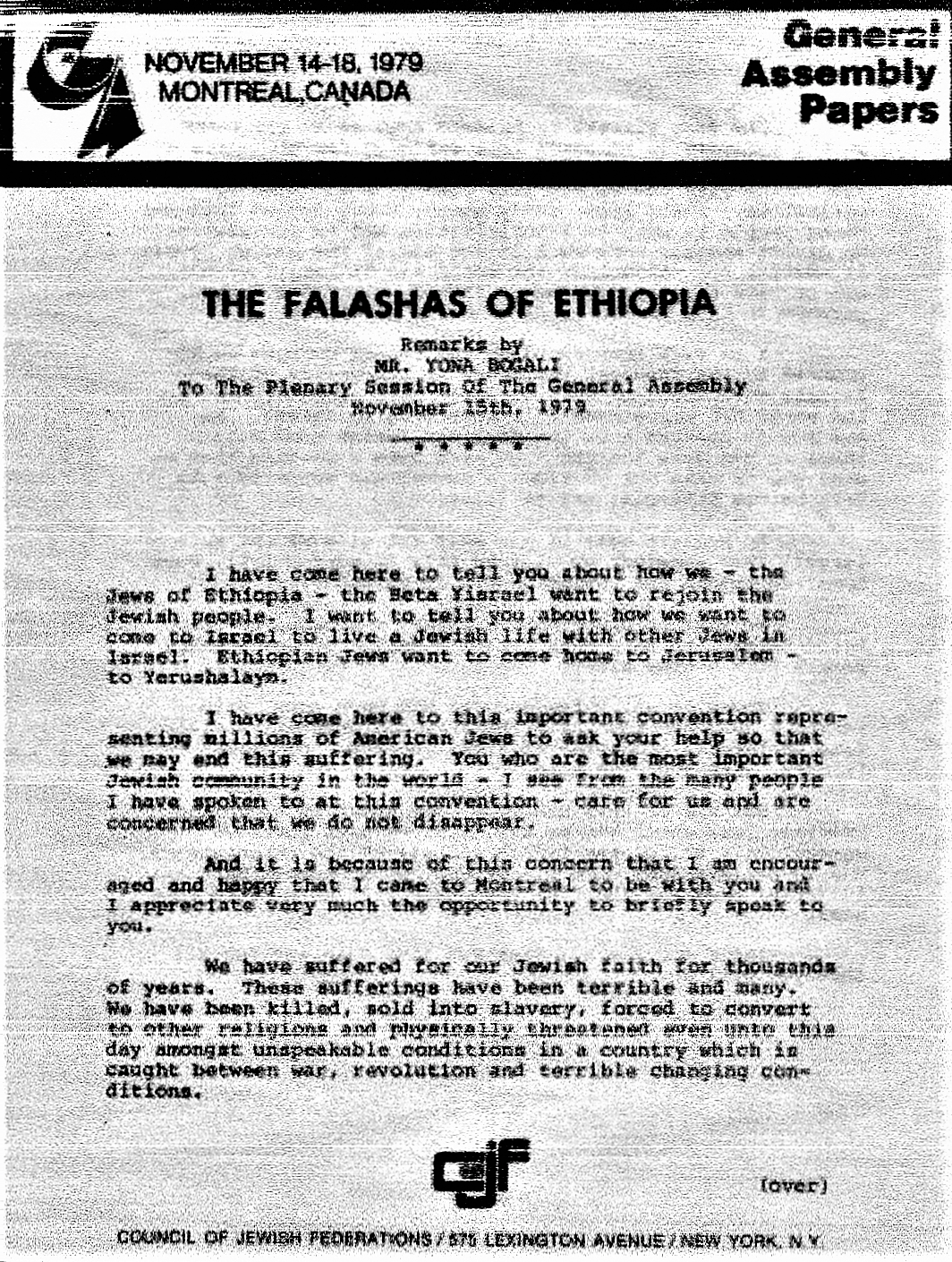
The first page of Yona's speech to the General Assembly of the North American Jewish Federation, at the Queen Elizabeth Hotel in Montreal, Canada in 1979

In 1979, increasingly pressured by the Derg, the military coalition that had replaced the King, Bogale emigrated to Israel with help from the American Association for Ethiopian Jews and his own relatives. Later that same year, Bogale, his son, Zecarias Yona, Rahamim Elazar and Baruch Tegegne traveled to Montreal, Canada, at the invitation of the Council of the Jewish Federations, to address that organization's General Assembly. On November 19, Bogale spoke during the plenary session to the 2,500 North American Jewish leaders in attendance. Following his presentation, delegates passed a pro-Beta Israel resolution, becoming the first major Jewish organization to support saving the Ethiopian Jewish community.

Upon his return to Israel, with the assistance of Prime Minister Menachem Begin, Bogale began consolidating support for Beta Israelis to return to their homeland. During the next few years, many Jews fled Ethiopia, stopping at refugee camps in Sudan, before arriving in Israel, although thousands died along the way. Finally, in 1984, with the cooperation of the Israel Defense Forces, the Central Intelligence Agency, the United States embassy in Khartoum, mercenaries, and Sudanese state security forces., a covert initiative named Operation Moses airlifted some 8,000 Beta Israelis to Israel. Bogale's son, Zecarias, played a key role in both Operations Moses and Solomon. The latter was an airlift by the Israeli military in 1991 that brought more than 14,000 Ethiopian Jews from Addis Ababa to Jerusalem.

Yona Bogale died in 1987 at his home in Petah Tikva. His funeral was attended by over 4,000 mourners, including the Speaker of the Knesset, Shlomo Hillel. He was buried in Har Hamenuchot, Jerusalem, near the grave of his teacher, Professor Tamrat Emmanuel .

== Legacy ==
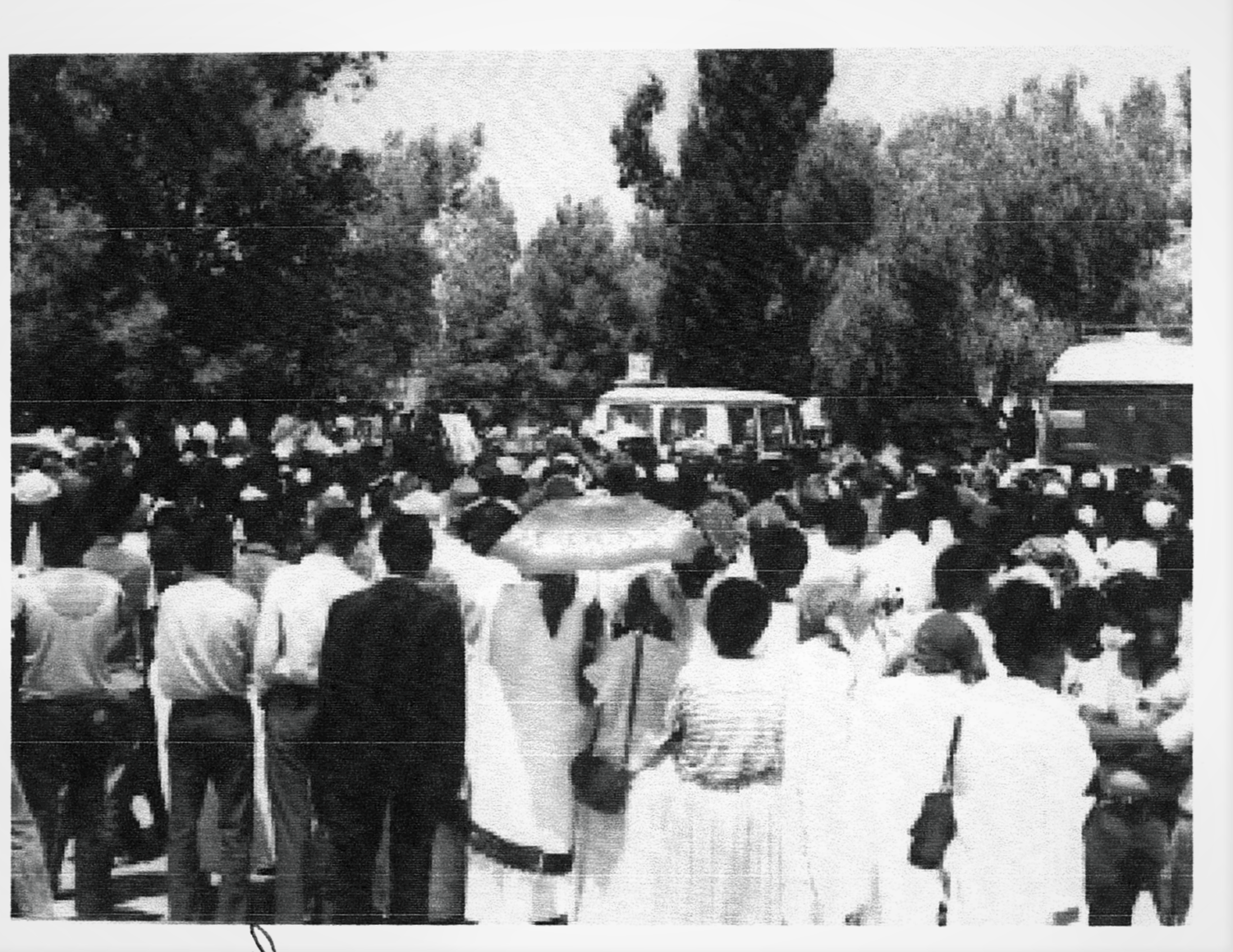
Yona Bogale's funeral in Jerusalem in 1987 drew more than 4,000 mourners.

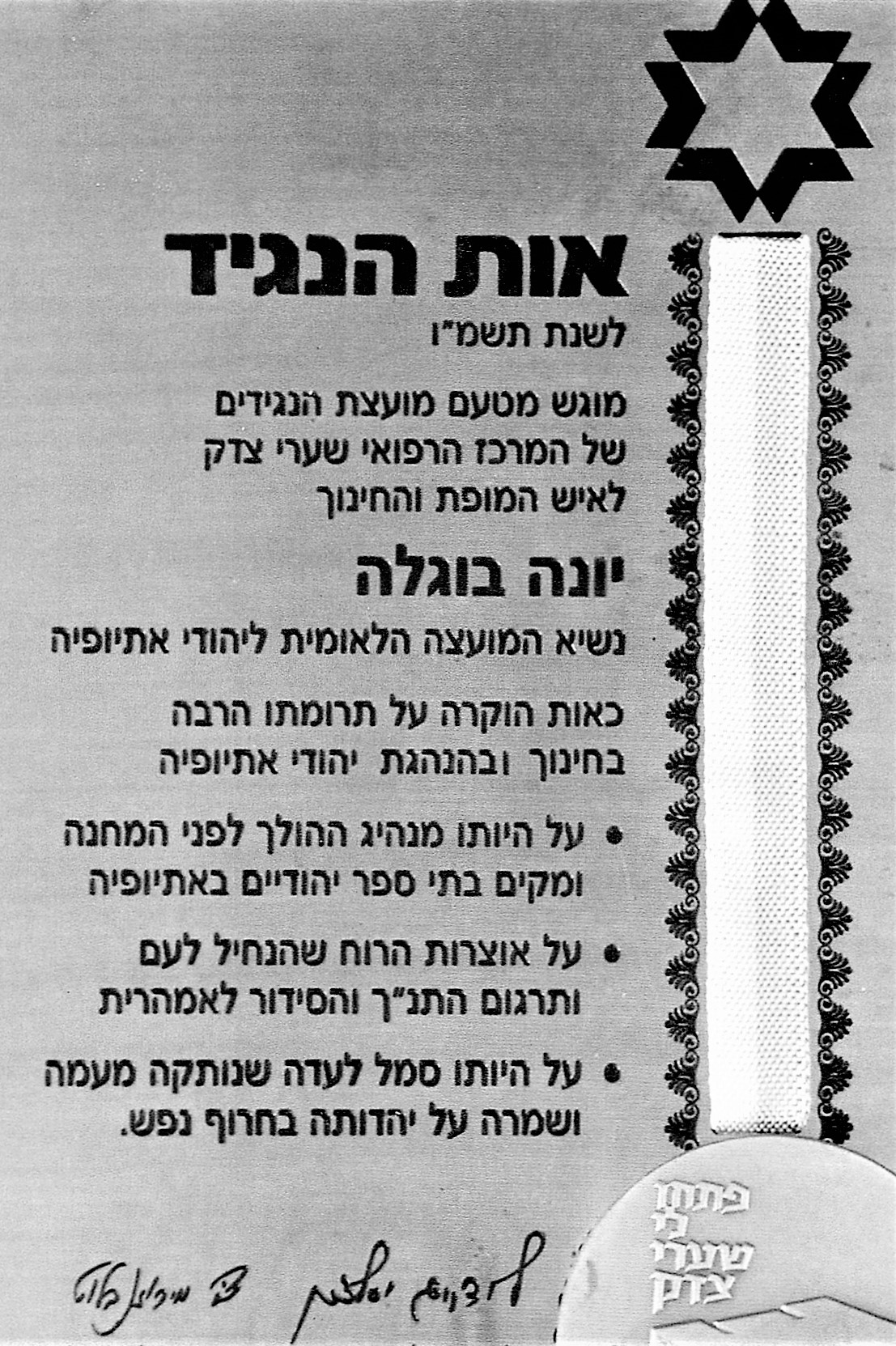
The Oat Hanegid Award, presented to Yona in 1985 for his years of service to Beta Israel

Because of his devotion to his people and his persistence in freeing them from oppression, Bogale has often been compared to Mahatma Gandhi, Nelson Mandela, Martin Luther King Jr. and Theodor Herzl. In addition to his life's work of returning the Beta Israelis to their homeland in Israel, he was a prolific author, editor and translator. Among other works, he published A "Falasha" Book of Jewish Festivals, an Amharic translation of portions of Pirke Avot and other prayer books, a Hebrew-Amharic dictionary, and translations of two 16th Century history books—all intended to give those Ethiopian Jews who were not proficient in Hebrew access to books in their native tongue, as well as the means to learn the language of their religion. Fluent in Hebrew, Yiddish, English, French, Italian, German, Tigrinya, Oromia, Geez and Amharic languages, he introduced the Beta Israel community to the first Hebrew-English-Amharic calendar, published every year from 1954 to 1978. Bogale was an early proponent of Ethiopian Jews praying in Hebrew instead of the ancient Semitic language, Ge'ez, as he felt that it was no longer appropriate for those seeking to be a part of the broader Jewish community. However, he did think that Hebrew prayers could be set to Ethiopian Jewish melodies to preserve some liturgical traditions of the Beta Israel community. Examples of Bogale's work and one of his awards appear below:

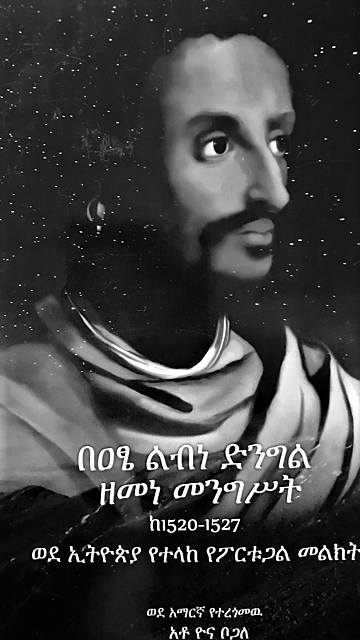
Translation by Yona of a 16th Century Portuguese history, Be Atse Libne Dinguel Zemene Mengest (The Government in the Era of Emperor Lebna Dengel)

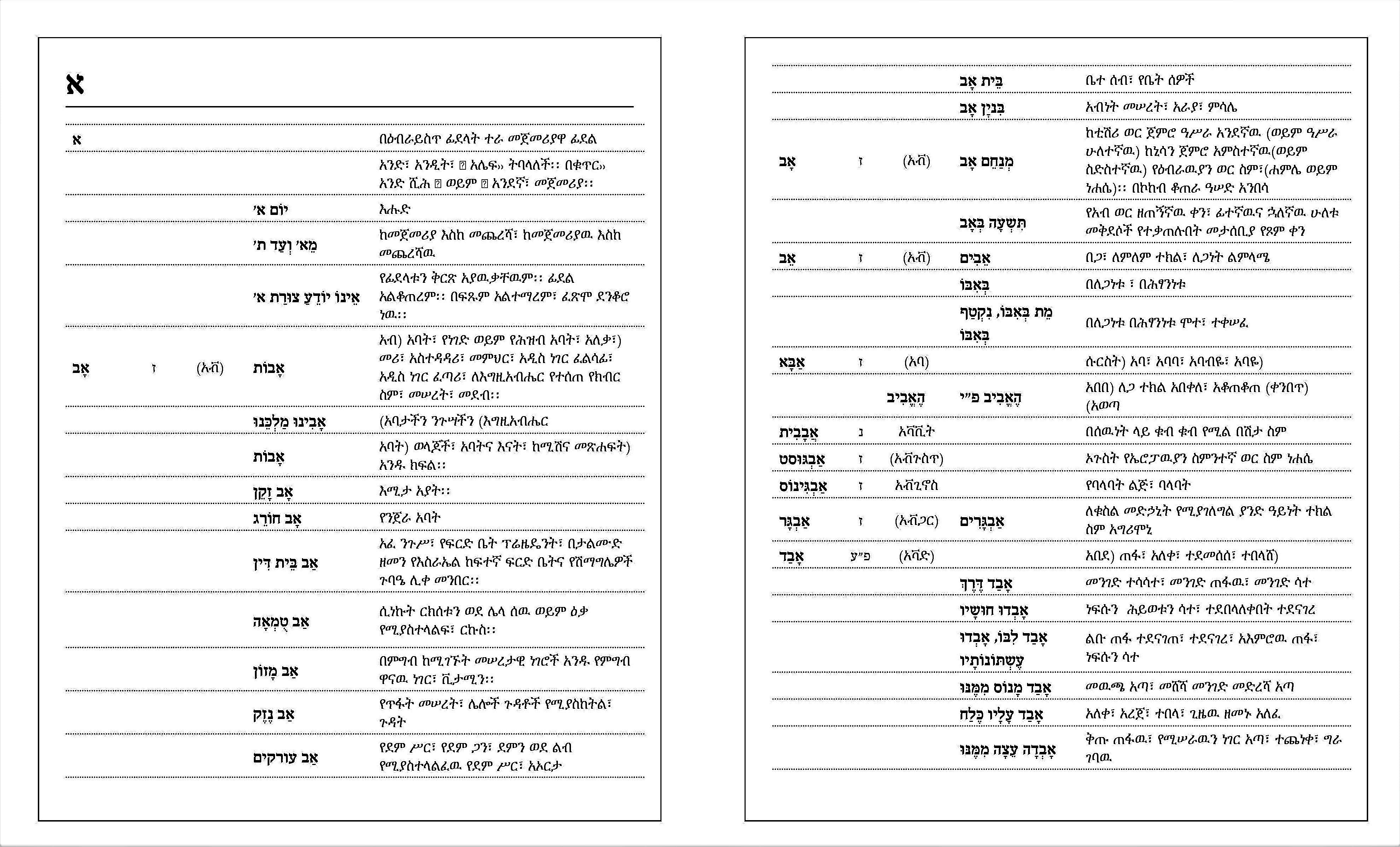
Pages from the first Amharic-Hebrew Dictionary, compiled by Yona Bogale to aid his fellow Beta Israelis with their literacy in the Hebrew language

Bogale's life and work are depicted in a 2009 Israeli documentary I had a Dream - The Story of Yona Bogale by Tizita Germany. He is the subject of many articles, essays and other publications, including two biographies by his son, Zecarias Yona: Yona Bogale and the Case of the Beta Israelis (Amharic), and Yona Bogale: Hero and Savior of the Ethiopian Jews (English)

- 1985 recipient of the Oat Hanegid, the Israeli Knesset's highest award, for service to Beta Israel, presented by Shlomo Hilel, Knesset president. (As Minister of the Interior in 1977, Hilel was instrumental in passing the resolution that Ethiopian Jews can emigrate to Israel under the Law of Return.
- 2020 proclamation, dedicating streets named for Yona Bogale in Rishon LeZion, Israel.
- 2007, the Rehovot City Council voted to name a local school after Bogale.
- During the celebration of Israel's 60th Anniversary in 2008, a special tribute paid by Prime Minister Ehud Olmert to Yona Bogale and the Ethiopian community.
