= History of the Jews in Ethiopia =

The location of Ethiopia in Africa

The history of the Jews in Ethiopia dates back millennia. The largest Jewish group in Ethiopia is the Beta Israel. Offshoots of the Beta Israel include the Beta Abraham and the Falash Mura, Ethiopian Jews who were converted to Christianity, some of whom have reverted to Judaism. Addis Ababa is home to a small community of Adeni Jews. Chabad also maintains a presence in Addis Ababa.

== Historical ==
=== Early history (325– 1270) ===
The historical region of Beta Israel

According to the Beta Israel tradition, the legendary Kingdom of Beta Israel, later called the Kingdom of Simien, was initially established after Ezana declared Christianity as the official religion of the Kingdom of Aksum. The inhabitants who practiced Judaism refused to convert to Christianity and began revolting; this group was referred to as "Beta Israel". Following a civil war between the Jewish population and the Christian population, the Beta Israel were said to have forged an independent state located in the Semien Mountains region and the Dembia region – situated to the north of Lake Tana and south of the Tekezé River. However, there is no evidence that directly support its existence, and its historicity is considered unlikely by scholars. Nothing in the historical record from the 6th to the 13th centuries, however, has allowed scholars to make anything more than very tentative hypotheses concerning the Jewish communities of that time.

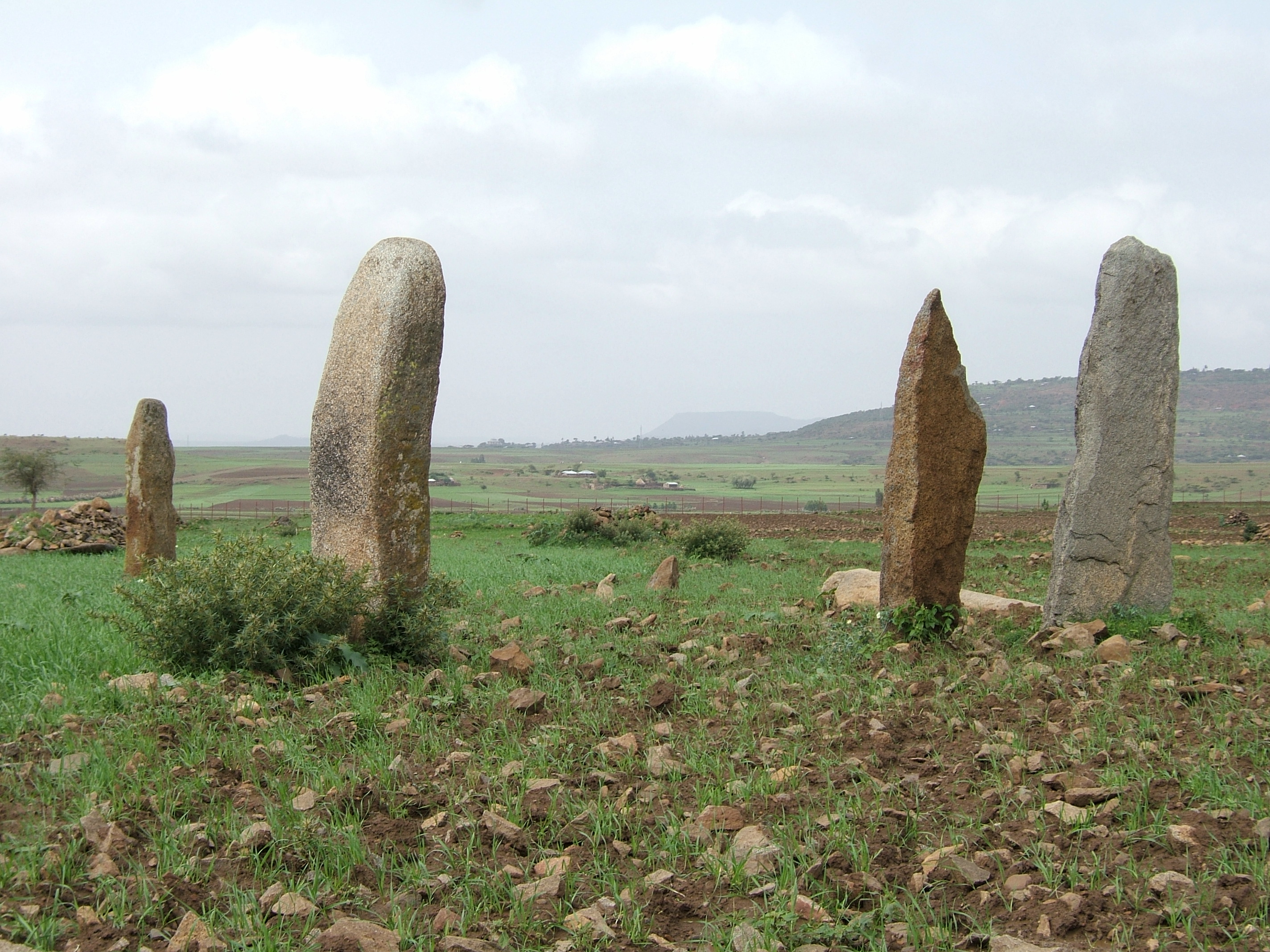
"Judith's Field": an area full of ruins of destroyed buildings which according to tradition were ruined by the forces of Queen Judith

According to Ethiopian legend, a Jewish Queen Judith signed a pact with the Agaw tribes which were pagans. Around 960, the large confederation led by Queen Judith, which included both forces of the Agaw tribes and the Beta Israel forces, invaded the capital city of Aksum, conquering and destroying it (including many churches and monasteries which were burned and destroyed) and imposed the Jewish rule over Aksum. However, legends surrounding a Jewish queen called Judith (Gudit) have been dismissed by scholars like Edward Ullendorff as without foundation in any historical facts.

According to Jewish traveler, Eldad ha-Dani, the Tribe of Dan established their own kingdom in Ethiopia, "They went by way of Egypt further down the upper Nile River and settled in Ethiopia, in East Africa. The Danites were great warriors, and after fighting many battles against native tribes, they established themselves securely, with a kingdom of their own." Marco Polo and Benjamin of Tudela also mention the existence of an Ethiopian Jewish community.

=== Christian dominance (1270–1855) ===
The earliest recorded mention of the Beta Israel comes from the Royal Chronicle of Emperor Amda Seyon, who sent troops to pacify the northwest provinces of Semien, Tselemt, Tsegede and Wegara where the Beta Israel had been gaining prominence. He sent troops there to fight people "like Jews" (Geʽez ከመ:አይሁድ kama ayhūd).

According to both Ethiopian written accounts and Beta Israel oral tradition, Emperor Yeshaq (1414–1429) began to exert religious pressure on the Beta Israel which sparked a revolt. Following the defeat of the rebellion, Yeshaq divided the territories of the Jews into three provinces, which were controlled by commissioners appointed by him. He reduced the Jews' social status below that of Christians and forced the Jews to convert or lose their land. It would be given away as rist, a type of land qualification that rendered it forever inheritable by the recipient and not transferable by the Emperor. Yeshaq decreed, "He who is baptized in the Christian religion may inherit the land of his father, otherwise let him be a Falāsī." This may have been the origin for the term "Falasha" (falāšā, "wanderer", or "landless person"). This term is considered derogatory to Ethiopian Jews.

In 1435, Elijah of Ferrara recounted meeting an Ethiopian Jew in Jerusalem in a letter to his children. The man told him of the ongoing conflict of his nation with the Christian Abyssinians; he relayed some of the principles of his faith, which, Ferrara concluded, balanced between Karaite and Rabbinical Judaism. His people were not familiar with the Talmud and did not observe Hanukkah, but their canon contained the book of Esther and they had an oral interpretation of the Torah. Ferrara further recorded that they had their own language, that the journey from their land lasted six months, and that the biblical Gozan river was found within their borders.

In the mid 15th century, Ethiopian missionaries began to carry out evangelization efforts in Seimen and Tselemt. Later on, the Beta Israel revolted against the Emperor Zara Yaqob (1434–1468) in the region of Seimen, this revolt was put down ruthlessly and many Ethiopian Jews in Seimen were massacred. The chronicler documenting the reign of Zara Yaqob even goes so far as to proudly bestow upon the Emperor the title "Exterminator of the Jews".

In the 16th century, the Chief Rabbi of Egypt, David ben Solomon ibn Abi Zimra (also called Radbaz, ca.1479–1573), proclaimed that in terms of halakha the Ethiopian Beta Israel community are ethnically Jewish.

The Beta Israel is later mentioned in the Futuh al-Habasha, the history of the conquests of Imam Ahmad ibn Ibrahim al-Ghazi. According to this source, Emperor Dawit II took refuge in a royal stronghold of Bahr Amba on the Simien Mountains, while besieging the stronghold, the Imam came across the Jews of Simien. The chronicler describes the encounter between the Imam and the Beta Israel:

Jewish Abyssinians (once) controlled the district of Semien. They are called, in their own language, Falasa, because they chant the praise of the One God and have faith in none other. They have no Prophet and no saint. For forty years the people of Bahr Amba had enslaved them and put them to work as servants. They tilled the fields for them. After the imam had won the victory over the patrician Sa'ul, all the Falasa came from deep valleys and even from mountain caves – because they did not dwell in the lowlands, but in the mountains and in caves. They said to the imam "For forty years there has been hatred between us and the people of Bahr Amba. Let us kill them now, those who are left. And let us occupy their strongholds now that you have conquered them. We will be sufficient to do this to them. So, remain in your camp, and what we will do to them will astonish you."

After the death of Dawit II, the Beta Israel then switched their alliance and began supporting Emperor Gelawdewos against the Muslim invaders. The Christian Ethiopians did succeed eventually in defeating the Muslims and preventing Ahmed Gragn from conquering Ethiopia. The Beta Israel then maintained good relations with Gelawdewos until the end of his reign.

During the reign (1563–1597) of Emperor Sarsa Dengel, the Emperor launched a devastating campaign against the Beta Israel with the use of cannons that he recently captured from the Ottomans. While on this campaign, Sarsa Dengel learned that the Borana Oromo had invaded the provinces of Shewa, Wej, and Damot. Despite this, Sarsa Dengel refused to defend these territories against the Oromos and instead continued to focus his attention on the Beta Israel. This decision generated considerable frustration among his officials but the Emperor justified his action by stating: "It is better for me that I fight with the enemies of the blood of Jesus Christ [i.e. Jews] than go to fight against the Galla." The Ethiopian forces continued to pacify the Jews, culminating in the capture and execution of the Jewish rebel leader, Goshen. Following his death, many of the Beta Israel committed mass suicide.

In 1614, the Jews of Seimen rebelled against the Emperor Susenyos I. By 1624, the revolt had been quelled, and the conclusive defeat of a subsequent uprising the following year marked the end of the political autonomy of the Beta Israel.

==== Gondar period (1632–1855) ====
After the Beta Israel autonomy in Ethiopia ended in the 1620s, Emperor Susenyos I confiscated their lands and forcibly baptized others. In addition, the practice of any form of Jewish religion was forbidden in Ethiopia. As a result of this period of oppression, much traditional Jewish culture and practice was lost or changed.

Nonetheless, the Beta Israel community appears to have continued to flourish during this period. The capital of Ethiopia, Gondar, in Dembiya, was surrounded by Beta Israel lands. The Beta Israel served as craftsmen, masons, and carpenters for the Emperors from the 16th century onwards. Such roles had been shunned by Ethiopians as lowly and less honorable than farming. These accounts also recounted that some knowledge of Hebrew persisted among the people in the 17th century. For example, Manoel de Almeida, a Portuguese diplomat and traveller of the day, wrote that:

There were Jews in Ethiopia from the first. Some of them were converted to the law of Christ Our Lord; others persisted in their blindness and formerly possessed many wide territories, almost the whole Kingdom of Dambea and the provinces of Ogara and Seman. This was when the [Christian] empire was much larger, but since the [pagan and Muslim] Gallas have been pressing in upon them [from the east and south], the Emperors have pressed in upon them [i. e., the Jews to the west?] much more and took Dambea and Ogara from them by force of arms many years ago. In Seman, however, they defended themselves with great determination, helped by the position and the ruggedness of their mountains. Many rebels ran away and joined them till the present Emperor Setan Sequed [throne name of Susneyos], who in his 9th year fought and conquered the King Gideon and in his 19th year attacked Samen and killed Gideon. ... The majority and the flower of them were killed in various attacks and the remainder surrendered or dispersed in different directions. Many of them received holy baptism, but nearly all were still as much Jews as they had been before. There are many of the latter in Dambea and in various regions; they live by weaving cloth and by making zargunchos [spears], ploughs and other iron articles, for they are great smiths. Between the Emperor's kingdoms and the Cafres [Negroes] who live next to the Nile outside imperial territory, mingled together with each other are many more of these Jews who are called Falashas here. The Falashas or Jews are ... of [Arabic] race [and speak] Hebrew, though it is very corrupt. They have their Hebrew Bibles and sing the psalms in their synagogues.

The isolation of the Beta Israel community in Ethiopia was also reported by the Scottish explorer James Bruce who visited Gondar in the 18th century: "The only copy of the Old Testament, which they have, is the translation in Geez, the same made use of by the Abyssinian Christians, who are the only scribes, and sell these copies to the Falasha Jews; and no controversy, or dispute about the text, has ever yet arisen between the professors of the two religions. They have no Ketubah, or various readings; they have never heard of Talmud, Targum, or Cabala; neither have they any fringes or ribband upon their garments; nor is there, as far as I could learn, one scribe among them."

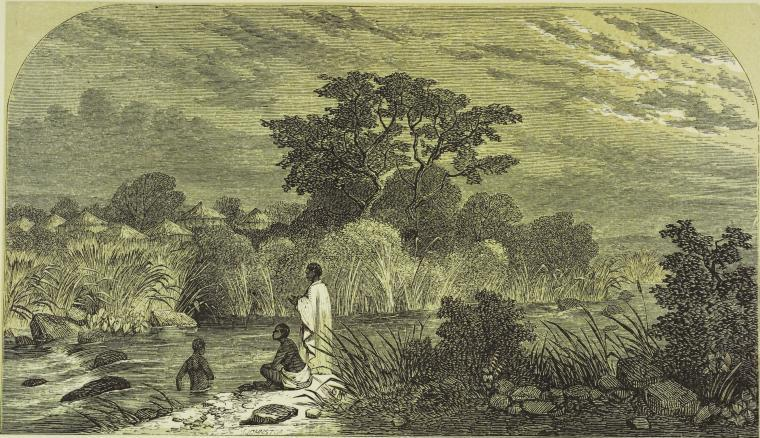
The Beta Israel village of Balankab, from H. A. Stern, Wanderings Among the Falashas in Abyssinia, 1862

The Beta Israel lost their relative economic advantage in the late 18th and early 19th centuries, during the Zemene Mesafint, a period of recurring civil strife. Although the capital was nominally in Gondar during this time period, the decentralization of government and dominance by regional warlords resulted in a decline and exploitation of Beta Israel. According to the early 19th century missionary Samuel Gobat, the Christians considered the Jews boudas, or sorcerers, and they often fell victim to marauding warlords, as Gobat reported "Their cattle are often taken from them. They carry no arms, either for attack or defense." During this period, the Jewish religion was effectively lost for some years, before being restored in the 1840s by Abba Widdaye, the preeminent monk of Qwara.

== 16th-century rabbinic view ==
Rabbi David ibn Zimra of Egypt (1479–1573), when asked about a certain black-skinned woman taken captive from Ethiopia (Judeo-Arabic: אל-חבאש) and sold to a Jew in Egypt (the woman claiming to be of Jewish descent), wrote of the impressions the Jews of Egypt had at that time of their Ethiopian counterparts who claimed Jewish descent:

...Lo! the matter is well-known that there are perpetual wars between the kings of Kush, which has three kingdoms; part of which belonging to the Ishmaelites, and part of which to the Christians, and part of which to the Israelites from the tribe of Dan. In all likelihood, they are from the sect of Sadok and Boethus, who are [now] called Karaites, since they know only a few of the biblical commandments, but are unfamiliar with the Oral Law, nor do they light the Sabbath candle. War ceases not from amongst them, and every day they take captives from one another...

In the same responsum, he concludes that if the Ethiopian Jewish community wished to return to rabbinic Judaism, they would be received and welcomed into the fold, just as the Karaites who returned to the teachings of the Rabbanites in the time of Rabbi Abraham ben Maimonides.

== Modern history ==
The contemporary history of the Beta Israel community begins with the reunification of Ethiopia in the mid-19th century during the reign of Tewodros II. At that time, the Beta Israel population was estimated at between 200,000 and 350,000 people.

=== Christian missions and the Rabbinical reformation ===
Regions in which the Beta Israel community has lived in modern times

Despite occasional contacts in an earlier stage, the West only became well-aware of the existence of the Beta Israel community when they came in contact through the Protestant missionaries of the "London Society for Promoting Christianity Amongst the Jews" which specialized in the conversion of Jews. The organization began its operating in Ethiopia in 1859. The Protestant missionaries, who worked under the direction of a converted Jew named Henry Aaron Stern, converted many of the Beta Israel community to Christianity. Between 1859 and 1922, about 2,000 Beta Israel members converted to Ethiopian Christianity (they did not convert to Protestantism due to an agreement the Protestant missionaries had with the government of Ethiopia). The relatively low number of conversions is partly explained by the strong reaction to the conversions from religious leadership of the Beta Israel community. The Beta Israel members who were converted to Christianity are known today as "Falash Mura".

The Protestant missionaries' activities in Ethiopia provoked European Jewry. As a result, several European rabbis proclaimed that they recognized the Jewishness of the Beta Israel community, and eventually in 1868 the organization "Alliance Israélite Universelle" decided to send the Jewish-French Orientalist Joseph Halévy to Ethiopia in order to study the conditions of the Ethiopian Jews. Upon his return to Europe, Halévy made a very favorable report of the Beta Israel community in which he called for world Jewish community to save the Ethiopian Jews, to establish Jewish schools in Ethiopia, and even suggested to bring thousands of Beta Israel members to settle in Ottoman Syria (a dozen years before the actual establishment of the first Zionist organization).

Nevertheless, after a brief period in which the media coverage generated a great interest in the Beta Israel community, the interest among the Jewish communities worldwide declined. This happened mainly because serious doubts still remained about the Jewishness of the Beta Israel community, and because the Alliance Israélite Universelle organization did not comply with Halévy's recommendations.

Between 1888 and 1892, northern Ethiopia experienced a devastating famine. The famine was caused by rinderpest that killed the majority of all cattle (see 1890s African rinderpest epizootic). Conditions worsened with cholera outbreaks (1889–1892), a typhus epidemic, and a major smallpox epidemic (1889–1890).

About one-third of the Ethiopian population died during that period. It is estimated that between a half to two-thirds of the Beta Israel community died during that period.

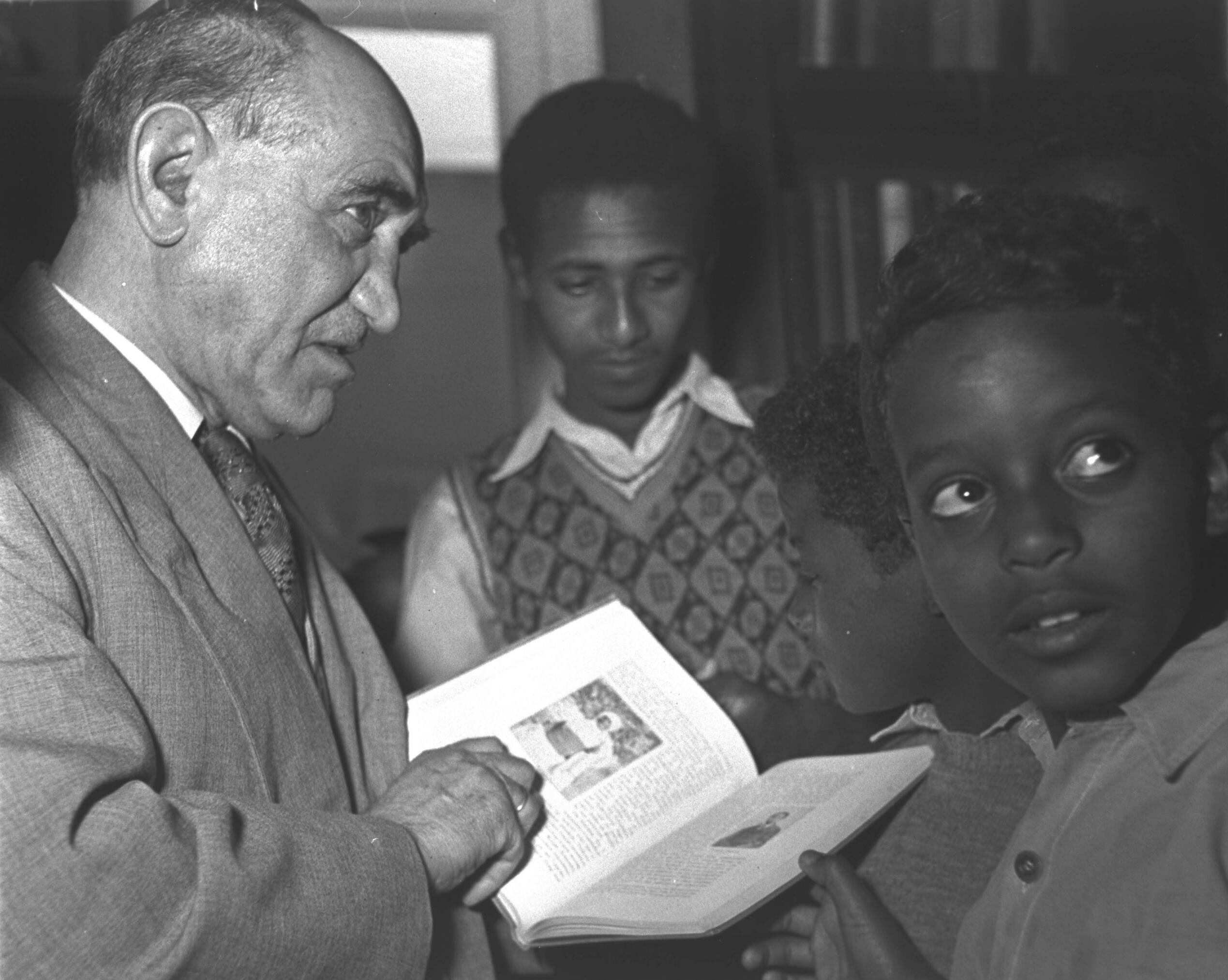
Jacques Faitlovitch during a visit of Ethiopian Jewish children in his Tel Aviv home, 1 May 1955

The myth of the lost tribes in Ethiopia intrigued Jacques Faitlovitch, a former student of Joseph Halévy at the Ecole des Hautes Etudes in Paris. In 1904, Faitlovitch decided to lead a new mission in northern Ethiopia. Faitlovitch obtained funding from the Jewish philanthropist Edmond de Rothschild, traveled and lived among the Ethiopian Jews. In addition, Faitlovitch managed to disrupt the efforts of the Protestant missionaries to convert the Ethiopian Jews, who at the time attempted to persuade the Ethiopian Jews that all the Jews in the world believe in Jesus. Between the years 1905–1935, he brought out 25 young Ethiopian Jewish boys, whom he planted in the Jewish communities of Europe, for example Salomon Yesha, Taamerat Ammanuel, Abraham Adgeh, Yona Bogale, and Tadesse Yacob.

Following his visit in Ethiopia, Faitlovitch created an international committee for the Beta Israel community, popularized the awareness of their existence through his book Notes de voyage chez les Falashas (1905), and raised funds to enable the establishment of schools in their villages.

In 1908, the chief rabbis of 45 countries made a joint statement officially declaring that Ethiopian Jews were indeed Jewish.

The Jewishness of the Beta Israel community became openly supported amongst the majority of the European Jewish communities during the early 20th century.

In 1921, Abraham Isaac Kook, the first Ashkenazi chief rabbi of the British Mandate for Palestine, recognized the Beta Israel community as Jews.

=== The Italian period, World War II and the post war period ===
In 1935, armed forces of the Kingdom of Italy, headed by the fascist leader Benito Mussolini, invaded and occupied Ethiopia.

The Italian regime showed hostility towards the Jews of Ethiopia. The racial laws which were enacted in Italy were also applied to Italian East Africa. Mussolini attempted to reach an agreement with Britain which would recognize Italian East Africa, during which Mussolini proposed to solve the "Jewish problem" in Europe and in Palestine by resettling the Jews in the north-west Ethiopian districts of Gojjam and Begemder, along with the Beta Israel community. The proposed Jewish state was to be federally united with the Italian Empire. Mussolini's plan was never implemented.

When the State of Israel was established in 1948, many Ethiopian Jews began contemplating immigrating to Israel. Nevertheless, the Emperor Haile Selassie refused to grant the Ethiopian Jewish population permission to leave his empire.

==== Early illegal emigration and the official Israeli recognition ====
Between the years 1965 and 1975, a relatively small group of Ethiopian Jews immigrated to Israel. The Beta Israel immigrants in that period were mainly a very few men who had studied and come to Israel on a tourist visa, and then remained in the country illegally.

Some supporters in Israel who recognized their Jewishness decided to assist them. These supporters began organizing associations, including one under the direction of Ovadia Hazzi, a Yemeni Jew and former sergeant in the Israeli army who married a wife from the Beta Israel community after the Second World War. Some of the illegal immigrants managed to regularize their status with the Israeli authorities through the assistance of these support associations. Some agreed to "convert" to Judaism, which helped them to regularize their personal status and thus remain in Israel. Those who had regularized their status often brought their families to Israel as well.

In 1973, Ovadia Hazzi officially raised the question of the Jewishness of the Beta Israel to the Israeli Sephardi rabbi Ovadia Yosef. The rabbi, who cited a rabbinic ruling from the 16th century Radbaz and asserted that the Beta Israel are descended from the lost tribe of Dan, acknowledged their Jewishness in February 1973. This ruling was initially rejected by the Ashkenazi Chief Rabbi Shlomo Goren, who eventually changed his opinion on the matter in 1974.

In April 1975, the Israeli government of Yitzhak Rabin officially accepted the Beta Israel as Jews, for the purpose of the Law of Return (an Israeli act that grants all the Jews in the world the right to immigrate to Israel).

Later on, Israeli Prime Minister Menachem Begin obtained clear rulings from Ovadia Yosef that they were descendants of the Ten Lost Tribes. The Chief Rabbinate of Israel did, however, initially require them to undergo pro forma Jewish conversions, to remove any doubt as to their Jewish status.

=== Ethiopian Civil War ===
After a period of civil unrest, on September 12, 1974, a pro-communist military junta, known as the "Derg" ("committee"), seized power after ousting the emperor Haile Selassie I. The Derg installed a government which was socialist in name and military in style. Lieutenant Colonel Mengistu Haile Mariam assumed power as head of state and Derg chairman. Mengistu's years in office were marked by a totalitarian-style government, and the country's massive militarization, financed by the Soviet Union and the Eastern Bloc, and assisted by Cuba. Communism was officially adopted by the new regime during the late 1970s and early 1980s.

As a result, the new regime gradually began to embrace anti-religious and anti-Israeli positions, as well as showing hostility towards the Jews of Ethiopia.

Towards the mid-1980s, Ethiopia underwent a series of famines, exacerbated by adverse geopolitics and civil wars, which eventually resulted in the deaths of hundreds of thousands. As a result, the lives of hundreds of thousands of Ethiopians, including the Beta Israel community, became untenable and a large part tried to escape the war and the famine by fleeing to neighboring Sudan.

Concern for the fate of the Ethiopian Jews and fear for their well-being contributed eventually to the Israeli government's official recognition of the Beta Israel community as Jews in 1975, for the purpose of the Law of Return. Civil war in Ethiopia prompted the Israeli government to airlift most of the Beta Israel population in Ethiopia to Israel in several covert military rescue operations which took place from the 1980s until the early 1990s.

Addis Ababa at one point had a prominent Adenite community. Most of them left fairly quickly, with many making aliyah, however some stayed and established synagogues and Hebrew schools. By 1986, there were only six Adeni families left in the city, and almost all of their property was seized by the Mengistu regime.

=== Ethiopia–Israel relations ===
Ethiopia has an embassy in Tel Aviv; the ambassador is also accredited to the Holy See, Greece and Cyprus. Israel has an embassy in Addis Ababa; the ambassador is also accredited to Rwanda and Burundi. Israel has been one of Ethiopia's most reliable suppliers of military assistance, supporting different Ethiopian governments during the Eritrean War of Independence.

In 2012, an Ethiopian-born Israeli, Belaynesh Zevadia, was appointed Israeli ambassador to Ethiopia.

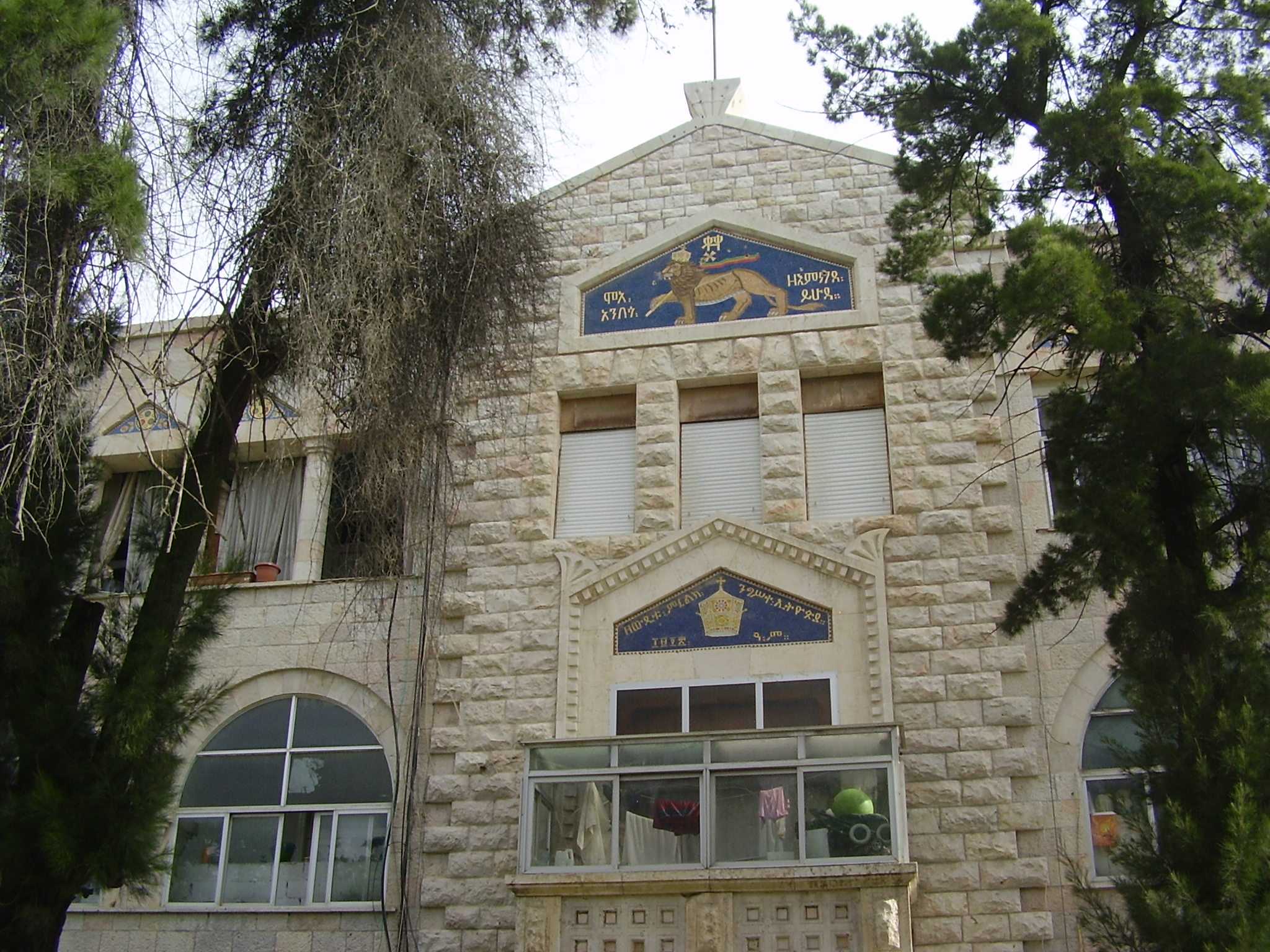
Ethiopian consulate in Jerusalem

During the imperial era, Israeli advisers trained paratroops and counterinsurgency units belonging to the Fifth Division (also called the Nebelbal, 'Flame', Division). In December 1960, a section of the Ethiopian army attempted a coup whilst the Emperor Haile Sellassie I was on a state visit in Brazil. Israel intervened, so that the Emperor could communicate directly with general Abbiye. General Abbiye and his troops remained loyal to the Emperor, and the rebellion was crushed.

In the early 1960s, Israel started helping the Ethiopian government in its campaigns against the Eritrean Liberation Front (ELF). The Ethiopian government portrayed the Eritrean rebellion as an Arab threat to the African region, an argument that convinced the Israelis to side with the Ethiopian government in the conflict. Israel trained counter-insurgency forces and the Governor General of Eritrea, Asrate Medhin Kassa, had an Israeli Military Attaché as his advisor. An Israeli colonel was put in charge of a military training school at Decamare and the training of the Ethiopian Marine Commando Forces. By 1966, there were around 100 Israeli military advisors in Ethiopia.

Ethiopian Prime Minister Aklilu Habte-Wold began seeking political support for breaking relations with Israel after the OAU summit. After long discussions, the cabinet voted to sever diplomatic links with Israel. The decision was however censored by a veto from the Emperor. Even after Ethiopia broke diplomatic relations with Israel in 1973, Israeli military aid continued after the Derg military junta came to power and included spare parts and ammunition for U.S.-made weapons and service for U.S.-made F-5 jet fighters. Israel also maintained a small group of military advisers in Addis Ababa. In 1978, however, when the Israeli Minister of Foreign Affairs Moshe Dayan admitted that Israel had been providing security assistance to Ethiopia, Mengistu Haile Mariam expelled all Israelis so that he might preserve his relationship with radical Arab states such as Libya and South Yemen. In 1983, for example, Israel provided communications training, and in 1984 Israeli advisers trained the Presidential Guard and Israeli technical personnel served with the police. Some Western observers believed that Israel provided military assistance to Ethiopia in exchange for Mengistu's tacit cooperation during Operation Moses in 1984, in which 10,000 Beta Israel (Ethiopian Jews) were evacuated to Israel. In 1985 Israel reportedly sold Addis Ababa at least US$20 million in Soviet-made munitions and spare parts captured in Lebanon. According to the Eritrean People's Liberation Front (EPLF), the Mengistu regime received US$83 million worth of Israeli military aid in 1987, and Israel deployed some 300 military advisers to Ethiopia. Additionally, the EPLF claimed that thirty-eight Ethiopian pilots had gone to Israel for training. In return for this aid, Ethiopia permitted the emigration of the Beta Israel. Departures in the spring reached about 500 people a month before Ethiopian officials adopted new emigration procedures that reduced the figure by more than two-thirds. The following year, Jerusalem and Addis Ababa negotiated another agreement whereby Israel provided agricultural, economic, and health assistance. Also, in May 1991, as the Mengistu regime neared its end, Israel paid US$35 million in cash to allow nearly 15,000 Beta Israel to emigrate from Ethiopia to Israel.

== See also ==
- History of the Jews in Africa

=== Regions: ===
- History of the Jews in Central Africa
- History of the Jews in East Africa
- History of the Jews in North Africa
- History of the Jews in Southern Africa
- History of the Jews in West Africa

=== Topics ===
- List of synagogues in Ethiopia
- Slavery in Ethiopia
