= Wolleka Synagogue =

Former synagogue in Wolleka, Ethiopia

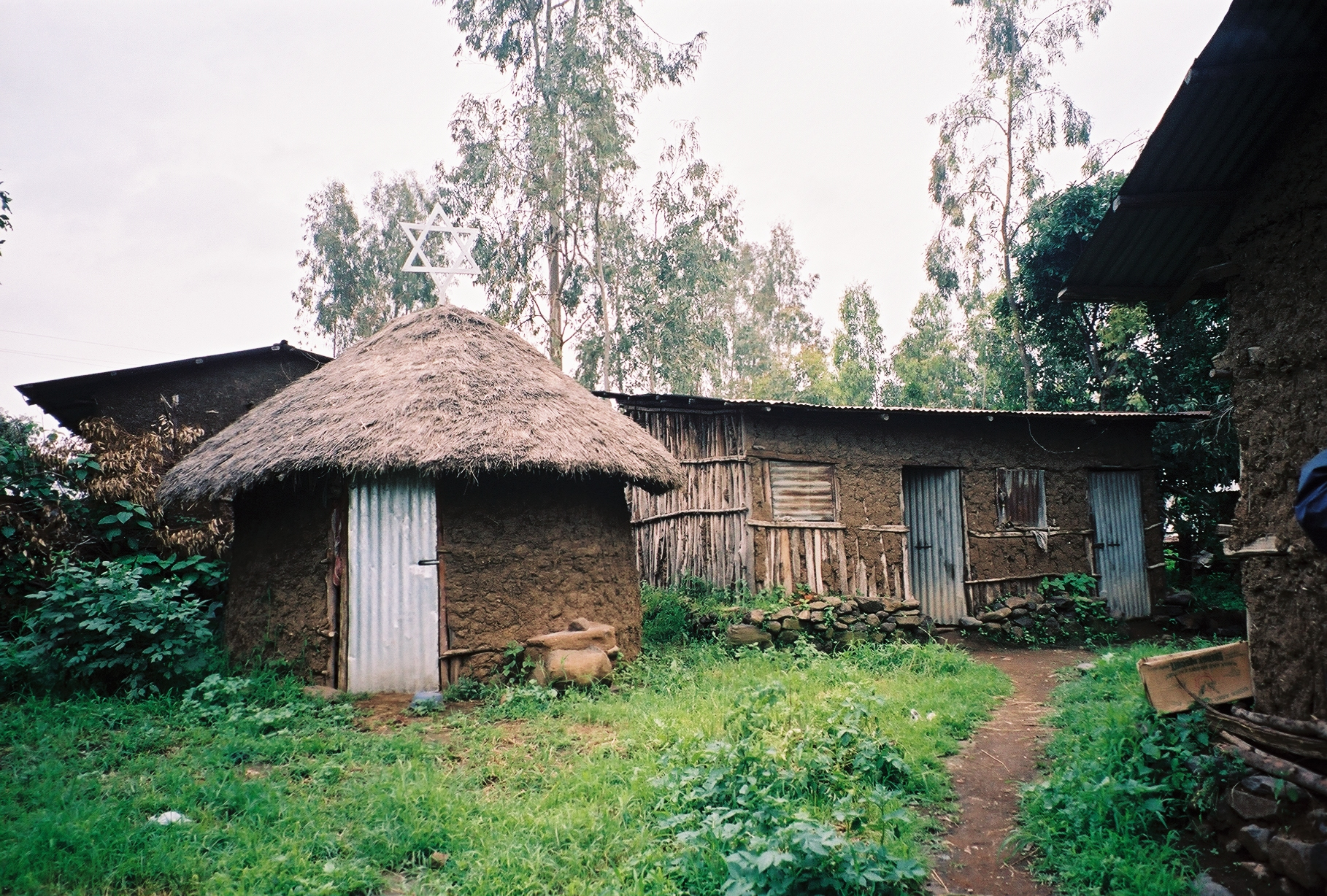
- The former synagogue, in 2003

- Approximate location of the former synagogue in Ethiopia

Religion
- Affiliation: Haymanot Judaism (former)
- Rite: Beta Israel
- Ecclesiastical or organizational status: Synagogue (c. 19th century–c. 1990s)
- Status: Abandoned

Location
- Location: Wolleka
- Country: Ethiopia
- Interactive map of Wolleka Synagogue
- Coordinates: 12°38′N 37°29′E

Architecture
- Type: Octagonal synagogue
- Materials: Mudbrick; thatched wooden roof

The Wolleka Synagogue is a former Haymanot Jewish congregation and synagogue of the Beta Israel people, located in Wolleka, Ethiopia.

Following centuries of persecution, violent conflict with neighboring Christian kingdoms and aggressive pressure to convert to Christianity, the Beta Israeli Jews made Aliyah and settled in Israel in the early 1990s. The mud-bricked octagonal building, with a thatched wooden roof, is a popular attraction for Jewish tourists.

== See also ==
- Gondar
- History of the Jews in Ethiopia
- List of synagogues in Ethiopia
