= Succat Rahamim Synagogue =

Former synagogue in Addis Ababa, Ethiopia

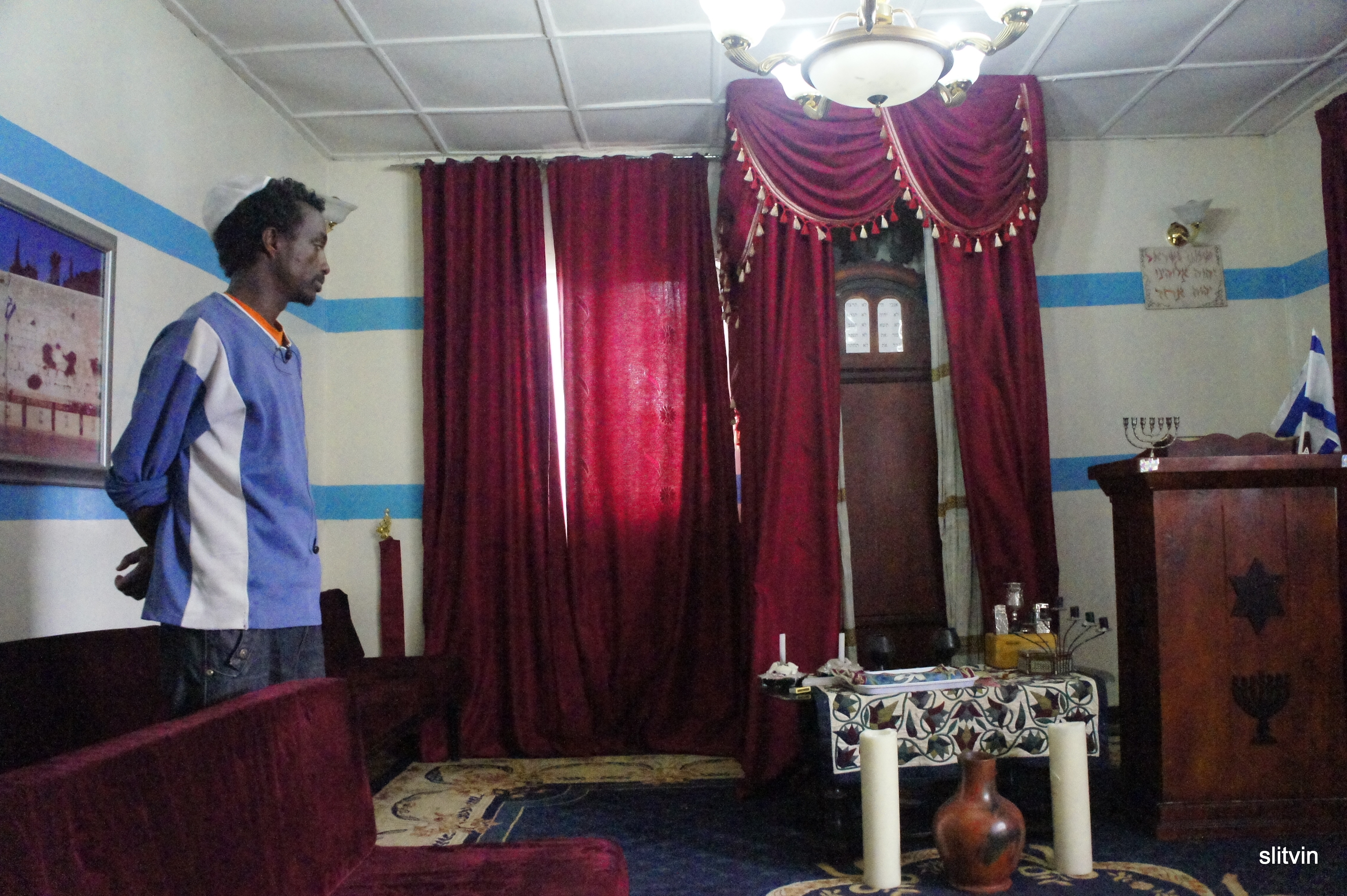
- The former synagogue interior in 2012

- Approximate location of the former synagogue in Ethiopia

Religion
- Affiliation: Judaism (former)
- Ecclesiastical or organisational status: Synagogue (c. 1920s–c. 2003)
- Status: Inactive

Location
- Location: Banin Sefer, Addis Ababa
- Country: Ethiopia
- Coordinates: 8°59′38″N 38°46′29″E

Architecture
- Type: Synagogue architecture
- Established: c. 1920s (as a congregation)
- Completed: c. 1950s

Specifications
- Length: 6.1 m (20 ft)
- Width: 6.1 m (20 ft)

The Succat Rahamim Synagogue is a former Jewish congregation and synagogue, located in the Banin Sefer neighborhood of Addis Ababa, Ethiopia. The square-shaped synagogue was established by Yemenite and Adenite Jews, most likely in the 1950s.

== History ==
The former synagogue is located in a neighborhood of Addis Ababa called Banin Sefer. In the early 1900s the Banins, a Jewish family originally from Aden in Yemen, owned much of the land in what is now downtown Addis Ababa. The synagogue dates to the mid-20th century. Between the 1950s and the 1970s, the synagogue bustled with members during the holidays and on Shabbat.

Due to the dwindling Jewish community in Addis Ababa, the synagogue has not had a rabbi for decades and, as of 2003, there were regularly not enough men to have a minyan.

== See also ==
- Adeni Jews
- History of the Jews in Ethiopia
- List of synagogues in Ethiopia
- Yemenite Jews
