= List of synagogues in Ethiopia =

This is a list of notable synagogues in Ethiopia.

== Addis Ababa ==
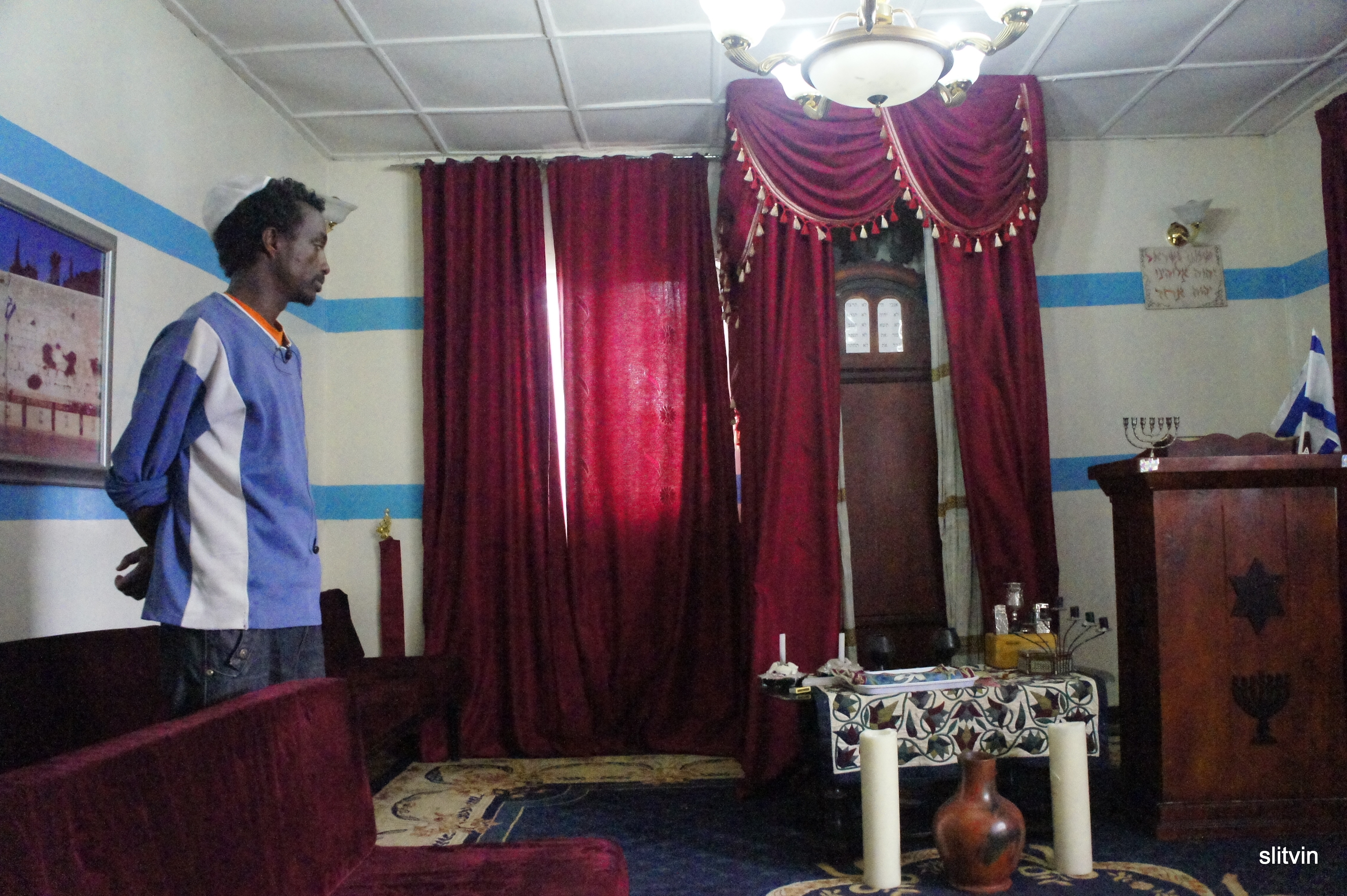

- Bet Selam (House of Peace) Synagogue, Kechene (Beta Abraham)
- Jewish Center - Chabad Ethiopia (Hasidic)
- Jewish Sinagog Association (Beta Israel)
- Succat Rahamim Synagogue (Adenite/Yemenite), no longer active

== Ambober ==
- Ambober Synagogue (Beta Israel)

== Gondar ==
- HaTikvah Synagogue (Beta Israel)

== Wolleka ==
- Wolleka Synagogue (Beta Israel), no longer active

== See also ==
- Beta Abraham
- Beta Israel
- History of the Jews in Ethiopia
