= Taamrat Emmanuel =

Jewish intellectual

- Born: 1888; Azezo, Ethiopia
- Died: December 31, 1963 (aged 75)
- Parent(s): Davit and Tronesh

Taamrat Emmanuel (Circa 1888 - 1963) was a Jewish Ethiopian public figure, professor, rabbi and intellectual. Taamrat was one of the most prominent figures in the Beta Israel community in the Jewish Enlightenment movement and in the Early modern period.

== Biography ==
=== 1888 to 1921 ===
Taamrat was born on 1888 in the town of Azezo near the city of Gondar. Taamrat's home village became Christian prior to his birth, and therefore he grew up being part of the Falashmura community. In his youth Taamrat attended the School of the Swedish Evangelical Mission in Italian Eritrea. At the age of 16 Taamrat met Dr. Jacques Faitlovitch, who took him back with him to Paris to study. When Taamrat arrived in Paris in 1904, he was sent to a school for teachers of the Alliance israélite universelle organization which was located in Paris. Four years later on, in 1908, when Taamrat was 20 years of age, he was sent by Dr. Faitlovitch to a Jewish Theological Seminary (Collegio Rabbinico Italiano) in Florence, Italy under the watchful eye of Rabbi Dr. Samuel Hirsch Margulies and Rabbi Tzvi-Peretz Hayot. In 1915 Taamrat graduated from the seminary thus becoming a Rabbi, Shochet (Kosher slaughterer) and professor. Emmanuel taught afterwards at the same college for about 16 years and eventually in 1920, at the age of 32, he returned to Ethiopia with Faitlovitch.

=== 1921 to 1936 ===
After a year and a half in Ethiopia, Taamrat and Faitlovitch left Ethiopia and went to Mandatory Palestine where they lived between August 1921 until April 1923, at which point they returned to Ethiopia. When they returned to Ethiopia Faitlovitch established a Jewish school aimed at training teachers while Taamrat was appointed as the Director of the school. One of his own initiatives included the translation of the Matzhaf Cadoussa (the scriptures of the Beta Israel community) from the Ge'ez language, which had ceased to be the community's spoken language, to the more widely used and common Amharic language. Taamrat became one of the leaders in the Addis Ababa Jewish community, which at the time was rapidly increasing due to the Jewish migration to the city from various villages in northern Ethiopia.
