= Falash Mura =

Group of Ethiopian Jews who converted to Christianity

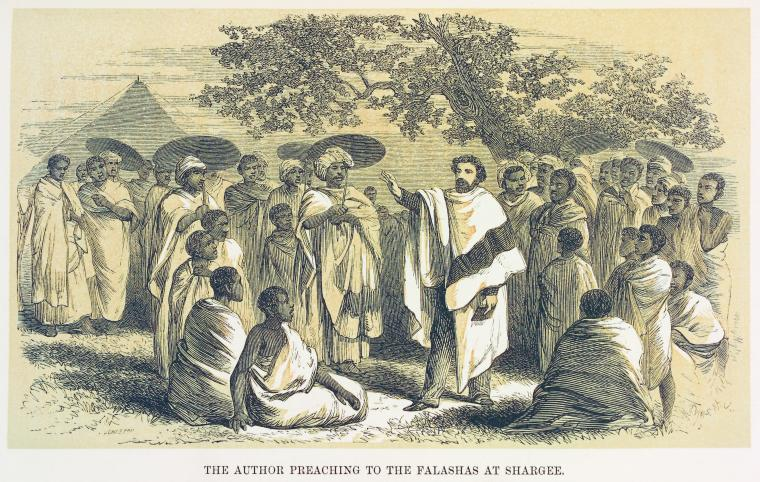
Missionary Henry Aaron Stern preaches Christianity to Beta Israel.

Falash Mura is the name given to descendants of the Beta Israel community in Ethiopia who converted to Christianity, primarily as a consequence of Western proselytization during the late 19th and early 20th centuries. This term also includes Beta Israel who did not adhere to any Ethiopian Jewish practices, as well as the aforementioned historical converts to Christianity. While most voluntarily converted, some were also forcibly converted against their will, or felt compelled to convert due to economic hardship and social exclusion in a majority Christian population.

Many have immigrated to Israel, but there are around 12,000 members of the Beta Israel communities in Addis Ababa and Gondar who are awaiting Aliyah, according to community records and lists compiled by SSEJ, which are in the hands of Israel's Ministry of the Interior.

Around 2010, Israeli officials claimed that many of the Falash Mura converted back to Christianity once safely out of Africa, however activists claimed that most Falash Mura converted to Judaism permanently.

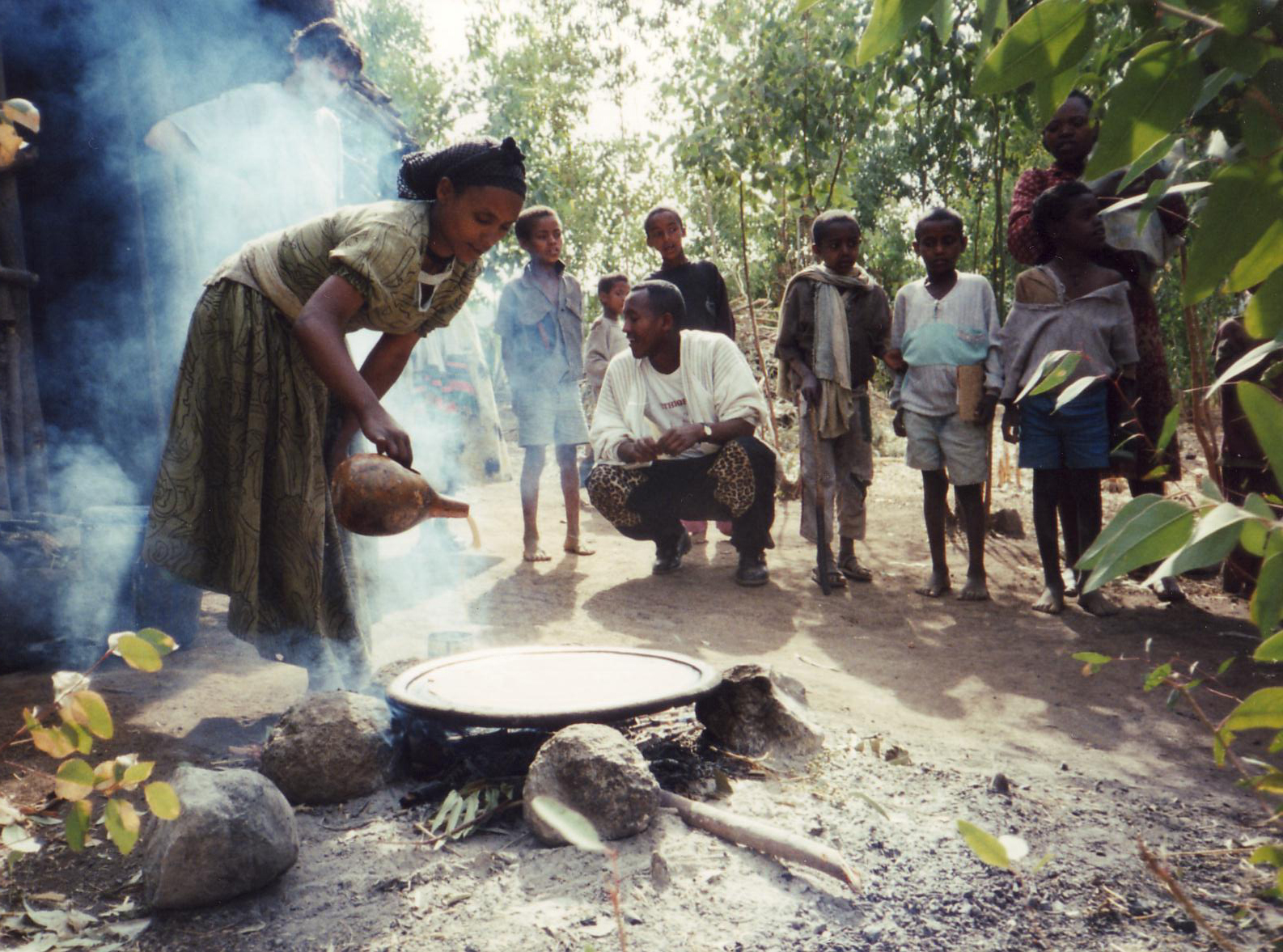
Falash Mura woman making injera in Gondar in 1996.

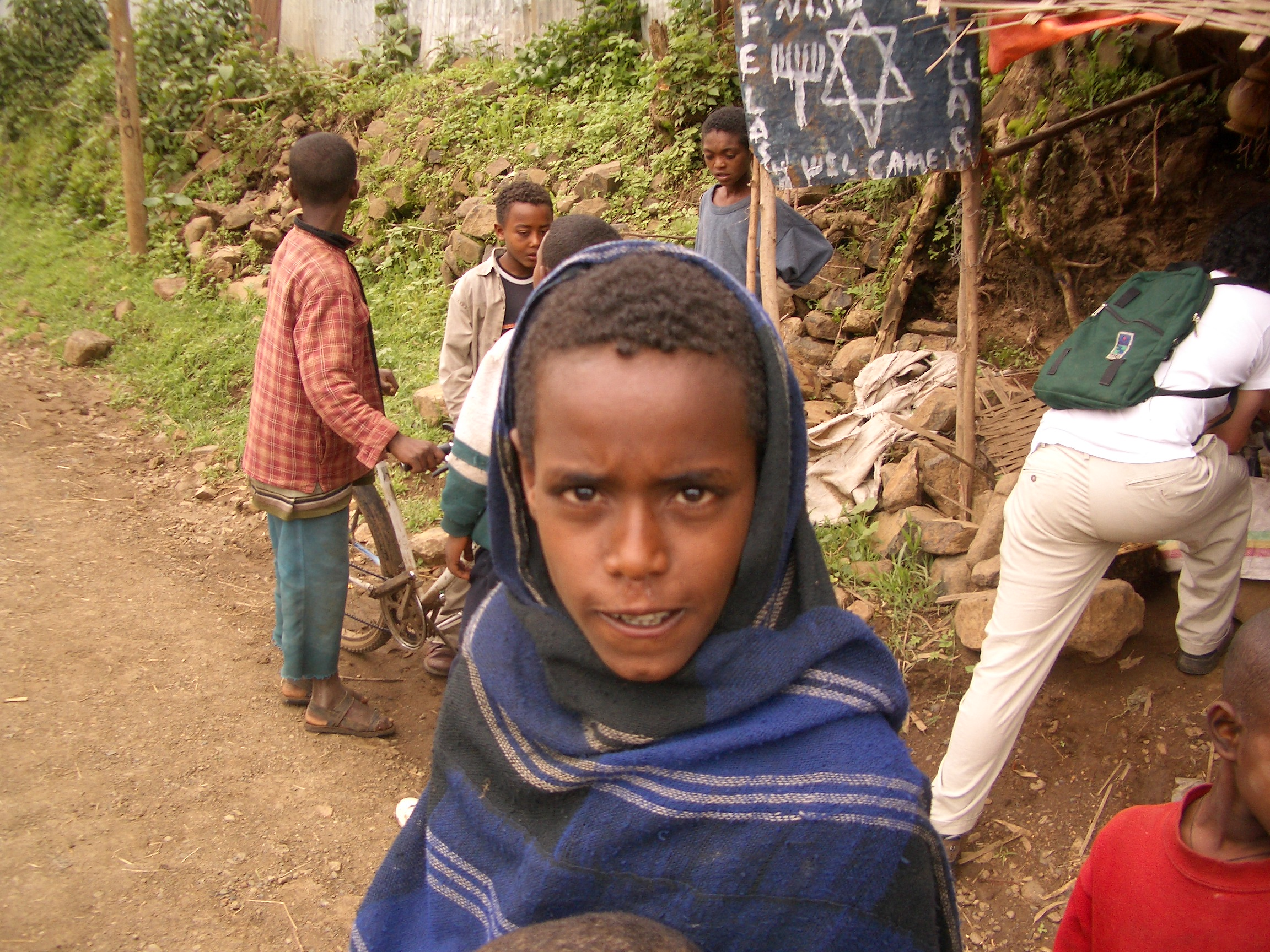
Falash Mura child, 2005

== Terminology ==
The original term the Beta Israel gave to the converts was Faras Muqra "horse of the raven", in which the word "horse" refers to the converts and the word "raven" refers to the missionary Johann Martin Flad of the Basel Mission, who used to wear black clothes. This term derived the additional names Falas Muqra, Faras Mura and Falas Mura. In Hebrew, the term Falash Mura or Falashmura is probably a result of confusion over the use of the term Faras Muqra and its derivatives, and based on false cognate, it was given the Hebrew meaning Falashim Mumarim "converted Falashas".

In Geʽez, the original language of the Betä Israel, Falasha means "cut off" or "exiled" or "immigrants". This term was coined due to the Betä Israel's resistance to converting to Christianity, which may have led to their internal exile in Ethiopia.

The term Falash Mura has no clear origin, but the Jewish Virtual Library suggests that the term may come from one of the Agaw languages and means "someone who changes their faith."

== History ==
In 1860, Henry Aaron Stern, a Jewish convert to Christianity, traveled to Ethiopia in an attempt to convert the Beta Israel community to Christianity.

=== Conversion to Christianity ===
For years, Jews were unable to own land and were often persecuted by the Christian majority of Ethiopia. Ethiopian Jews were afraid to touch non-Jews because they believed non-Jews were not pure, which also ostracized them from their Christian neighbors. For this reason, many Ethiopian Jews converted to Christianity to seek a better life in Ethiopia. The Jewish Agency's Ethiopia emissary, Asher Seyum, says the Falash Mura "converted in the 19th and 20th century, when Jewish relations with Christian rulers soured. Regardless, many kept ties with their Jewish brethren and were never fully accepted into the Christian communities. When word spread about the aliyah, many thousands of Falash Mura left their villages for Gondar and Addis Ababa, assuming they counted."

In the Achefer district of the West Gojjam Zone, roughly 1,000–2,000 families of Beta Israel were found. There may be other such regions in Ethiopia with significant Jewish enclaves, which would raise the total population to more than 50,000 people.

=== Return to Judaism ===
The Falash Mura did not refer to themselves as members of the Beta Israel, the name for the Ethiopian Jewish community, until after the first wave of immigration to Israel. Beta Israel by ancestry, the Falash Mura believe they have just as much of a right to return to Israel as the Beta Israel themselves. Ovadia Yosef, the Sefardic Chief Rabbi of Israel, a significant player in the first wave of Beta Israel immigration to Israel, declared in 2002 that the Falash Mura had converted out of fear and persecution and therefore should be considered Jews.

=== Aliyah to Israel ===
Today, Falash Mura who move to Israel must undergo conversion on arrival, making it increasingly difficult for them to get situated in Israeli society. The Beta Israel who immigrated and made Aliyah through Operation Moses and Operation Solomon were not required to undergo conversion because they were accepted as Jews under the Law of Return.

On February 16, 2003, the Israeli government applied Resolution 2958 to the Falash Mura, which grants maternal descendants of Beta Israel the right to immigrate to Israel under the Israeli Law of Return and to obtain citizenship if they convert to Judaism.

== Controversy ==
Today, both Israeli and Ethiopian groups dispute the Falash Mura's religious and political status. The Israeli government fears that these people are just using Judaism as an excuse to leave Ethiopia in efforts to improve their lives in a new country. Right-wing member of the Israeli Knesset Bezalel Smotrich was quoted saying, "This practice will develop into a demand to bring more and more family members not included in the Law of Return. It will open the door to an endless extension of a family chain from all over the world," he wrote, according to Kan. "How can the state explain in the High Court the distinction it makes between the Falashmura and the rest of the world?" Although the government has threatened to stop all efforts to bring these people to Israel, they have still continued to address the issue. In 2018, the Israeli government allowed 1,000 Falash Mura to immigrate to Israel. However, members of the Ethiopian community say the process for immigration approval is poorly executed and inaccurate, dividing families. At least 80 percent of the tribe members in Ethiopia say they have first-degree relatives living in Israel, and some have been waiting for 20 years to immigrate.

== See also ==
- History of the Jews in Ethiopia, for a general overview of historical Judaism in the region.
- Beta Abraham, a similar group thought to predate the conversions of the Falash Mura, and possibly pre-dating the widespread Christianization of Ethiopia. A more syncretic religious group, with a mix of (presumably) pre-Christian pagan, Judaic, and Christian elements. They consider themselves Jews, despite their lack of acceptance by the majority of either the Beta Israel and Ethiopian Christians.
