= Beta Abraham =

Crypto-Jewish offshoot of the Beta Israel community

Total population
- 150,000

Regions with significant populations
- Ethiopia 150,000

Languages
- Historical Jewish language Agaw (Kayla) Liturgical language Ge'ez Predominant spoken language Amharic

Religion
- Crypto-Judaism · Oriental Orthodox Christianity · Judaism

Related ethnic groups
- Beta Israel · Amhara

Beta Abraham Ge'ez: Bēta Abreham, "House of Abraham")—other terms by which the community have been known include Tebiban ("possessor of secret knowledge"), Balla Ejj (Ge'ez: "Craftsmens"), Buda (Ge'ez: "evil eye") and Kayla (the Agaw language spoken by them),—is a community regarded by some as a crypto-Jewish offshoot of the Beta Israel community. The size of the community is estimated to be somewhere upwards of 150,000 in number.

This community is concentrated mainly in the Northern Shewa Zone in the Amhara Region in Ethiopia.

The earliest reference to the Jewish community in the historical region of Shewa comes from the 14th century missionary Zena Marqos. More Jews arrived in the region of Shewa from the regions of Fogera and Dembiya during the rule of Negasi Krestos and as a result a first wave of Jewish immigration began in the years 1692-1702.

Negasi's grandson, the Meridazmach Abuye fought the forces of emperor Iyasu II, and later on held many of the emperor's soldiers in captivity. Eventually Abuye released some prisoners and appointed them to senior positions in the monarchy. Following this, a second Jewish migration wave began in 1730-1745, which was mainly prompted by the Jews' will to improve their living conditions.

There are quite a few surviving reports about the existence of a Jewish community in the Shewa region in the 19th century. In 1839 the European missionary Charles Isenberg toured Shewa's capital Ankober and reported that there were Jews around the capital of Shewa and that they were the descendants of those who emigrated from the Fogera region in the Begemder province to Shewa. Isenberg also mentioned that when he spoke with an Ethiopian missionary from the Ethiopian Church on 17 October 1839 he reported that several Jews integrated in the village and converted to Christianity. This came after another by the British traveler Charles Johnson in 1842 that stated that the Jews' economic situation was better off than their Christian neighbors and that they were more skilled and described them as successful merchants. In 1908 Dr. Jacques Faitlovitch reported that there are Jews in Shewa who are referred to by the derogatory name Buda by their neighbors.

== See also ==
- Falash Mura
