= Abraham Adgeh =

Ethiopian-Israeli scholar and engineer (born 1965)

- אברהם אדגה
- Born: 1965 (age 60–61); Ethiopia
- Citizenship: Israeli
- Education: Technion – Israel Institute of Technology
- Occupations: Author, engineer, activist
- Employer: Ministry of Aliyah and Integration

Abraham Adgeh (Hebrew: אברהם אדגה; born 1965) is an Ethiopian-Israeli writer, social activist, and scholar on the history of the Beta Israel. He is also a structural engineer and head of the laboratory department at Technion – Israel Institute of Technology. For his literary work, he won the Yuri Stern Minister of Immigrant Absorption Prize for Creative Immigrants in 2008.

== Biography ==
Adgeh was born in a rural village in Ethiopia. His father was a blacksmith, and he grew up with five brother and sisters. His elementary school was an hour's walk from his home, and his high school was three hours away from his house.

At the age of 17, he fled to Sudan after finding out that Mossad was organizing an immigration route for Ethiopian Jews to emigrate. He walked 600 kilometers with 15 other Jews, and was caught on the border by a Sudanese patrol officer 38 days later. He was transferred to a refugee camp, where he stayed for one year with a tropical disease. He forged a passport and left for a flight to Paris, and arrived in Israel in January 1984. Two years after immigrating, he reconnected with his parents.

He graduated from a high school in Haifa and completed his studies at Technion – Israel Institute of Technology. Since 1998, he has served as the head of the laboratory department in their Construction and Maintenance Division.

=== Research and activism ===
Adgeh frequently gives lectures at colleges and other public institutions on the history of the Ethiopian Jewish community. In 2013, he was appointed as a member to a committee in the field of literature at the Ministry of Aliyah and Integration. He volunteers for the Israeli government program "A New Way" to formulate policy for the integration of Ethiopian immigrants into Israel society.

On 28 September 2017, Adgeh, as part of the tenth Piyut Festival, hosted a conference for "Longing for Jerusalem Event of the Sacred Song of the Ethiopian Jews in an Encounter with the Hebrew Language".
