= Wolleka =

Wolleka ወለቃ וולקה
- Village
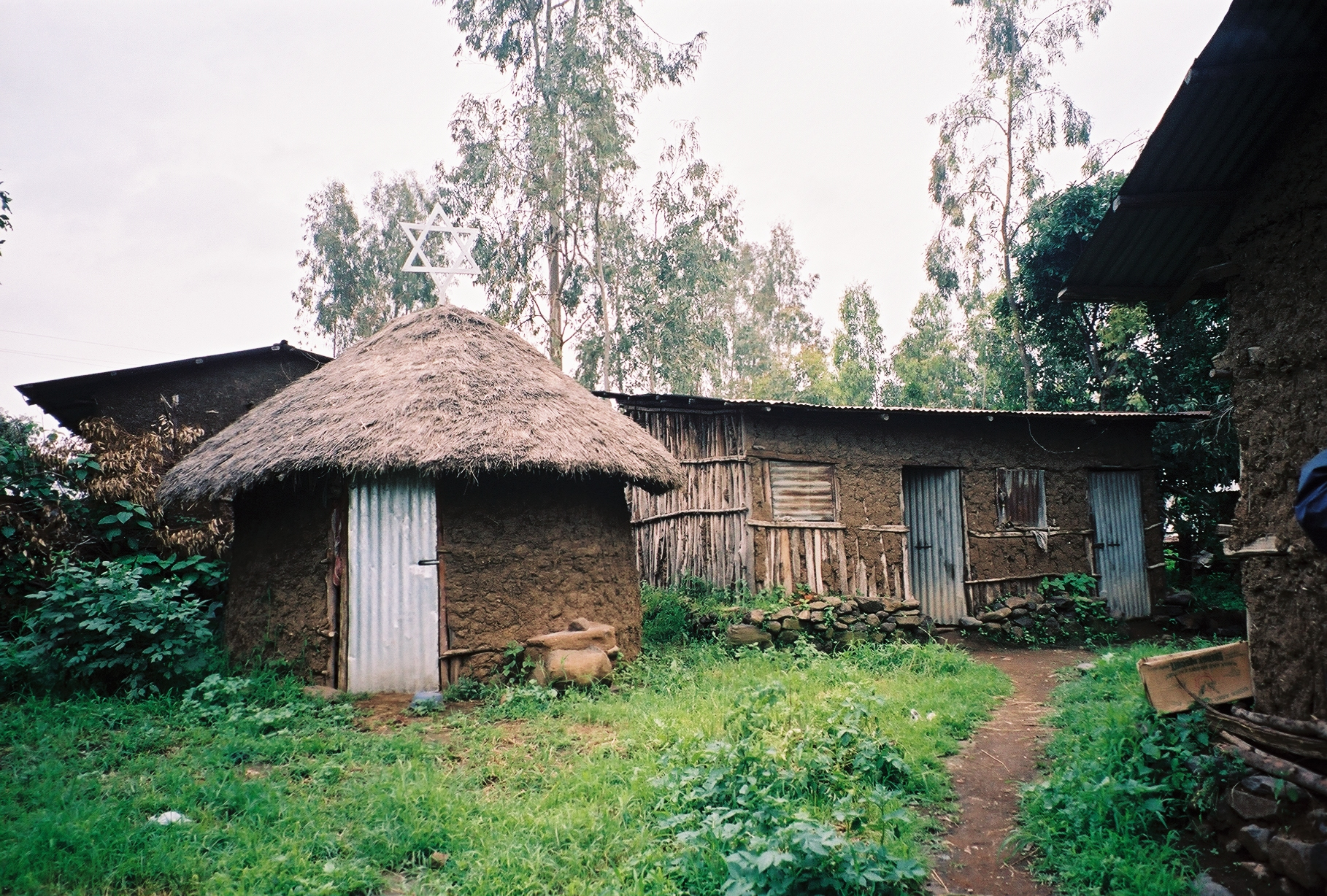

- Location within Ethiopia
- Coordinates: 12°38′N 37°29′E
- Country: Ethiopia
- Region: Amhara
- Zone: Semien Gondar Zone
- Time zone: UTC+3 (EAT)

Wolleka (Ge'ez: ወለቃ) is a village in Ethiopia, near Gondar, with a latitude and longitude of 12°38′N 37°29′E. The village is located in the Semien Gondar Zone of the Amhara Region.

Wolleka is the main centre of the Beta Israel - Ethiopian Jews. Although its population has declined, it is still known for its synagogue, its Jewish cemetery, and for pottery. The Central Statistical Agency has not published an estimate for its 2005 population.

== See also ==
- Wolleka Synagogue
