= Joseph Halévy =

French Orientalist (1827–1917)

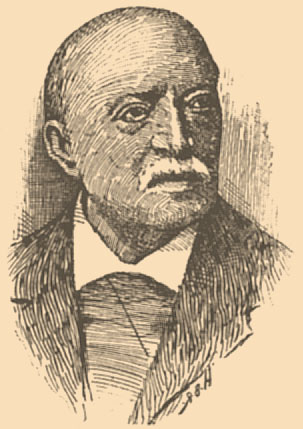
Joseph Halévy

Joseph Halévy (15 December 1827 – 21 January 1917) was an Ottoman-born Jewish-French Orientalist and traveller. Halévy's scientific activity has been very extensive, and his writings on Oriental philology and archeology have earned for him a worldwide reputation. His most notable work was done in Yemen, which he crossed during 1869 to 1870 in search of Sabaean inscriptions, no European having traversed that land since AD 24; the result was a most valuable collection of 800 inscriptions. He is also known for his leading role in the late 19th-century anti-Sumerist movement that denied the existence of Sumerian as a language distinct from Akkadian.

== Early life and education ==
Joseph Halévy was born in Adrianople and spent part of his youth in Vienna.

While a teacher in Jewish schools, first in his native town and later in Bucharest, he devoted his leisure to the study of Oriental languages and archeology, in which he became proficient.

== Scholarly career ==
Halévy joined the Société asiatique in 1866. In 1868 he was sent by the Alliance israélite universelle to Abyssinia to study the conditions of the Falashas. His report on that mission, which he had fulfilled with distinguished success, attracted the attention of the French Institute (Académie des Inscriptions et Belles-Lettres), which sent him to Yemen in 1870 to study the Sabaean inscriptions. Halévy returned with 686 of these, deciphering and interpreting them, and thus succeeding in reconstructing the rudiments of the Sabaean language and mythology. In 1879 Halévy became professor of Ethiopic in the École pratique des hautes études, Paris, and librarian of the Société Asiatique. Halévy was a professor at the University of Paris.

=== Anti-Sumerist movement ===
In 1878, contrary to the generally admitted opinion, Halévy put forward the theory that Sumerian was not a language, but merely an ideographic method of writing invented by the Semitic Babylonians themselves. He was joined by other scholars including Friedrich Delitzsch. Such scholars became known as anti-Sumerists or anti-Akkadists (the Sumerian language was still called "Akkadian" by some late 19th-century scholars), while their opponents were known as Sumerists or Akkadists.

Netanel Anor notes that "[i]n attacking the "Sumerists", Halévy was in fact trying to reject the anti-Semitic approaches such as that of [Ernest] Renan."

=== Biblical research ===
For the student of specifically Jewish learning the most noteworthy of Halévy's works is his "Recherches Bibliques," wherein he shows himself to be a decided adversary of the so-called higher criticism. He analyzes the first twenty-five chapters of Genesis in the light of recently discovered Assyro-Babylonian documents, and admits that Gen. i.-xi. 26 represents an old Semitic myth almost wholly Assyro-Babylonian, greatly transformed by the spirit of prophetic monotheism. The narratives of Abraham and his descendants, however, although considerably embellished, he regards as fundamentally historical, and as the work of one author. The contradictions found in these narratives, and which are responsible for the belief of modern critics in a multiplicity of authors, disappear upon close examination. The hypothesis of Jahwistic and Elohistic documents is, according to him, fallacious.

== Later years ==
Halévy died in Paris. He had been rewarded with the Legion of Honour.

== Works ==
His works are numerous, and deal with various branches of Oriental study.

The following are Halévy's principal works, all of which have been published in Paris:

- Mission archéologique dans le Yemen (1872)
- Essai sur la langue Agaou, le dialect des Falachas (1873)
- Voyage au Nedjrân (1873)
- Études berbères, Épigraphie lybique (1873)
- Mélanges d'épigraphie et d'archéologie sémitiques (1874)
- Études sabéennes (1875)
- La prétendue pangue d'Accad, est-elle touranienne? (1875)
- Études sur la syllabaire cunéiforme (1876)
- La nouvelle évolution de l'Accadisme (1876–78)
- Prières des Falachas, Ethiopic text with a Hebrew translation (1877)
- Recherches critiques sur l'origine de la civilisation babylonienne (1877)
- Essai sur les inscriptions du Safa (1882)
- Documents Religieux de l'Assyrie et de la Babylonie, text with translation and commentary (1882)
- Essai sur les Inscriptions du Safã (1882)
- Mélanges de critique et d'histoire relatifs aux peuples sémitiques (1883)
- Aperçu grammatical sur l'allographie assyro-babylonienne (1885)
- Essai sur l'origine des écritures indiennes (1886)
- La Correspondance d'Amenophis III. et d'Amenophis IV. Transcrite et Traduite (1891–93)
- Les Inscriptions de Zindjirli, two studies, 1893, 1899.
- Nouvelles observations sur les écritures indiennes (1895)
- Recherches Bibliques, a series of articles begun in "R. E. J."; continued, after 1893, in the Revue Sémitique d'Épigraphie et d'Histoire Ancienne, founded by Halévy; and published in book-form in 1895.
- Meliẓah we-Shir, Hebrew essays and poems (Jerusalem, 1895)
- Tobie et Akhiakar (1900)
- Le Sumérisme et l'Histoire Babylonienne (1900)
- Taazaze Sanbat, Ethiopic text and translation, (1902)
- Le Nouveau Fragment Hébreu de l'Ecclésiastique (1902)
- Les Tablettes Gréco-Babyloniennes et le Sumérisme (1902)
- Essai sur les Inscriptions Proto-Arabes (1903)
- Études Évangéliques (1903).

In the earlier part of his life he was a regular contributor to the Hebrew periodicals, the clarity of his Hebrew being greatly admired.

== Sources ==
- Anor, Netanel (2017). "Joseph Halévy, Racial Scholarship and the "Sumerian Problem"". Philological Encounters. doi:10.1163/24519197-12340033.
- Stroumsa, Guy G. (2021). The Idea of Semitic Monotheism.
