= Jacques Faitlovitch =

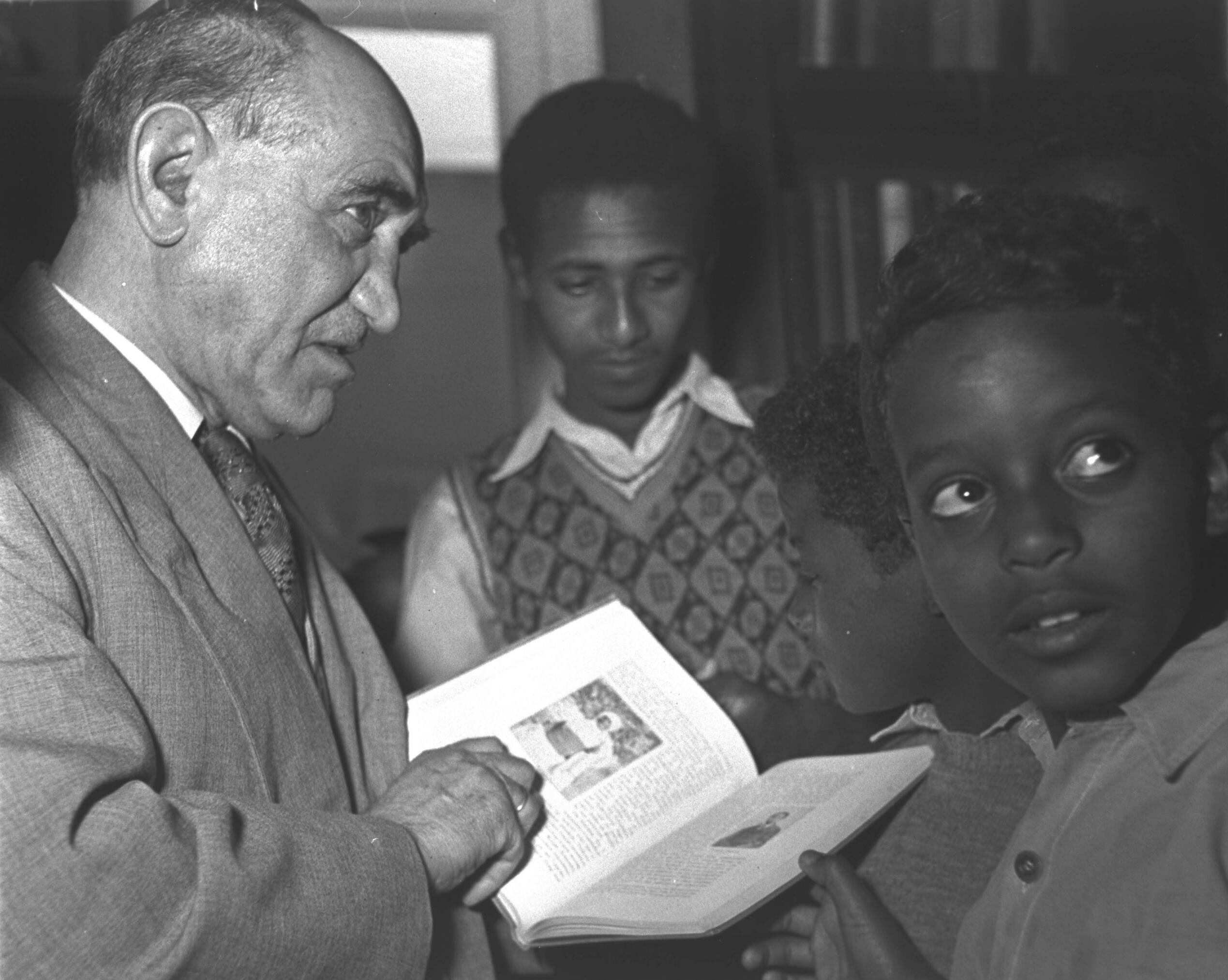
Jacques Faitlovitch (Tel Aviv, 1955)

Jacques Faitlovitch (Hebrew: 'יעקב פייטלוביץ; born February 15, 1881, Łódź, Congress Poland – died October 15, 1955, Tel Aviv) was a Jewish orientalist and activist. Following his studies with Joseph Halévy in Paris, he dedicated himself to supporting the Beta Israel. Between 1904 and 1946, Faitlovitch embarked on eleven journeys to Ethiopia, founding schools and raising funds to foster Jewish identity among them. His efforts significantly contributed to the Beta Israel’s shift from their indigenous religious practices and their integration into the global Jewish community, paving the way for their eventual migration to Israel.

== Biography ==
=== Origins and Academic Background ===
Born Yaacov Noah Faitlovitch in Łódź, he was the son of Moshe Faitlovitch and Rosalie Nussel. At 18, he briefly joined the Polish military before turning to academia, initially studying in Berlin and later moving to Paris to study Oriental languages at the École des Hautes Études. There, he became known as Jacques and studied under the prominent orientalist Joseph Halévy, whose research on the so-called Ethiopian Jews (Falascha or Beta Israel) sparked Faitlovitch’s lifelong dedication to this community. After earning his master’s in Oriental languages, he completed his doctorate at the University of Lausanne.

=== Early Efforts for the Beta Israel ===
From 1904 to 1946, Faitlovitch conducted eleven expeditions to Ethiopia, the first of which (1904–1905), sponsored by Baron Edmond Rothschild, was especially influential. During his 18-month stay, he immersed himself in the religious practices of the Beta Israel, publishing his findings in Notes d’un voyage chez les Falachas (1905). Convinced that the Beta Israel were Jews facing existential threats from Christian missionary activities, he committed himself to mobilizing global Jewish support for their preservation.

A key element of his “Jewish counter-mission” involved bringing members of the Beta Israel to Europe for comprehensive Jewish education, with the aim of training community leaders who could later serve in Ethiopia. The first two Ethiopians he brought to Europe were Tä ͗ammərat Amanu ͗el and Gette Erməyas. Lacking support from the influential Alliance Israélite Universelle, Faitlovitch established his own “Pro-Falasha” committees in Italy and Germany to raise funds for his mission.

One notable journey (1908–1909) brought him back to Ethiopia, where he was received by Emperor Menelik II. Faitlovitch used this opportunity to advocate for fair treatment of the Beta Israel. His experiences from this trip were published in German as Quer durch Abessinien (1910) and later in Hebrew as Massa el ha-Falashim (1959).

=== Activities from 1913 Onward ===
In 1913, during his third trip to Ethiopia, Faitlovitch founded a school in Dembiya to provide a Jewish education for the children of Beta Israel. After the First World War, he increasingly focussed on the United States. He lectured at the University of Geneva (1915-1919) and founded a boarding school in Addis Ababa in 1923. Although he settled in Tel Aviv in 1927, he continued to travel frequently, especially to the USA, where he gave lectures and collected donations. The Italian invasion of Ethiopia (1935-1936) and the Second World War finally brought his work to a halt. After the founding of Israel in 1948, however, he managed to persuade the Jewish Agency to fund educational initiatives for Beta Israel. He was a tireless advocate of their integration into the Jewish world, as he firmly believed that the Beta Israel were ethnically and religiously connected to the Jewish people.

== Legacy ==
Faitlovitch, driven by a profound sense of religious duty, dedicated his efforts to studying Beta Israel and facilitating its reintegration into the broader Jewish community. Over his lifetime, he organized the education of 25 young members of Beta Israel, bringing them to Europe, Egypt, and Palestine for training. Upon their return, these individuals played a dual role within their communities, intensifying existing tensions while also promoting the adoption of normative Jewish practices.

In addition to his work with Beta Israel, Faitlovitch was also involved in the search for other ‘nidhei Israel’ (the ‘scattered Israelis’) and proselytism, founding several committees. His best-known publications include Mota Mus (1906), Proverbes Abyssins (1907), Nouveaux Proverbes Abyssins (1909), Les Falachas d'après les Explorateurs (1907), Versi Abissini (1910) and Falasha Letters (1913). His only English publication, The Falashas., appeared in the American Jewish Year Book in 1920.

Faitlovitch left behind a valuable library, which he bequeathed to the Tel Aviv city council. Today, this collection is housed at Tel Aviv University, a lasting testimony to his devotion to Beta Israel and his endeavour to bring it into the Jewish fold.

== Literature ==
- Steven Kaplan. “Faitlovitch, Jacques.“ In Encyclopaedia Aethiopica (EA), vol. 2, ed. Siegbert Uhlig, Wiesbaden, 2005, pp. 243f.
- Max Wurmband & Emanuela Trevisan Semi. “Faïtlovitch, Jacques.” In Encyclopaedia Judaica, vol. 6, 2nd ed., ed. Michael Berenbaum & Fred Skolnik, Detroit, 2007, pp. 677f.
- Emanuela Trevisan Semi & Todor Parfitt. Jacques Faitlovitch and the Jews of Ethiopia, London/Portland OR, 2007.
