= 1953 in Israel =

- Decades: 1930s; 1940s; 1950s; 1960s; 1970s
- See also: History of Israel; Timeline of Israeli history; List of years in Israel

Events in the year 1953 in Israel.

== Incumbents ==
- Prime Minister of Israel – David Ben-Gurion (Mapai)
- President of Israel – Yitzhak Ben-Zvi
- President of the Supreme Court – Moshe Smoira
- Chief of General Staff – Mordechai Maklef until 6 December, Moshe Dayan
- Government of Israel – 4th Government of Israel

== Events ==
- 11 February – The Soviet Union breaks diplomatic relations with Israel after an explosion occurs in the Soviet embassy building in Tel Aviv, which was planted by the Tzrifin Underground.
- 4 March – The remains of Naftali Herz Imber, a Ukrainian-born Jewish poet who wrote the lyrics of Israel's national anthem "Hatikvah", are brought to Israel from New York in accordance with his will.
- 26 May – Two members of the radical religious Jewish underground organisation Brit HaKanaim are arrested while on their way to plant an explosive device in Israeli Ministry of Education building, in protest against the State Education Law (חוק חינוך ממלכתי).
- 20 April – The Israel Prize is awarded for the first time.
- July – The 1953 Maccabiah Games are held.
- 6 August – Israeli Air Force Mosquito FB.6, disappears in flight over the Mediterranean: two crew are missing.
- 12 August – The State Education Law (חוק חינוך ממלכתי) is approved by the Knesset.
- 19 August – Yad Vashem, Israel's official memorial to the Jewish victims of the Holocaust, is established in Jerusalem through the Yad Vashem Law passed by the Knesset.
- 29 August – Three young Israeli men and two young Israeli women who attempt secretly to cross the border into Jordan in order see the ancient city of Petra are killed by Jordanian soldiers.
- 8 September – The founding of the kibbutz Metzer.
- 22 September – The Conquest of the desert world's fair opened in Jerusalem.
- 28 September – Following military action against the 'Azazme bedouin the IDF established the kibbutz Ktzi'ot.
- 14 October – Operation Shoshana (מבצע שושנה), also known as Qibya massacre: Following an attack in which an Israeli mother and her two children are killed, IDF forces under the command of Ariel Sharon attack the Arab village Qibya in the West Bank, which had been annexed by Jordan in 1950. Sixty-nine Jordanian citizens are killed during the operation.
- 5 November – David Ben-Gurion announces his intention to resign as Prime Minister of Israel.
- 6 December – Moshe Dayan is appointed as the fourth Chief of Staff of the Israel Defense Forces.

=== Israeli–Palestinian conflict ===
The most prominent events related to the Israeli–Palestinian conflict that occurred during 1953 include:

Notable Palestinian militant operations against Israeli targets

The most prominent Palestinian fedayeen attacks committed against Israelis during 1953 include:

- 14 April – Armed Palestinian infiltrators tried for the first time to infiltrate Israel by sea, but were unsuccessful. One of the boats was intercepted and the other boat escaped.
- 25 May – Armed Palestinian Arab militants, who infiltrated to Israel from Jordan, attack an Israeli family in Beit Nehemia, killing a woman and wounding her husband and her two children.
- 7 June – Armed Palestinian Arab militants, who infiltrated to Israel from Jordan, attacked residential areas in southern Jerusalem, killing a youngster and wounding three others.
- 9 June – Armed Palestinian Arab militants, who infiltrated to Israel from Jordan, attacked a farming community near Lod, and killed one of the residents. The gunmen threw hand grenades and sprayed gunfire in all directions. On the same night, another group of terrorists attacked a house in the town of Hadera. This occurred a day after Israel and Jordan signed an agreement, with UN mediation, in which Jordan undertook to prevent terrorists from crossing into Israel from Jordanian territory.
- 10 June – Armed Palestinian Arab militants, who infiltrated to Israel from Jordan, enter kibbutz Mishmar Ayalon and kill a 19-year-old Israeli woman in her sleep.
- 11 June – Armed Palestinian Arab militants, who infiltrated to Israel from Jordan, throw hand grenades into a young couple's home in the moshav Kfar Hess, killing an Israeli woman and severely wounding her husband.
- 2 September – Armed Palestinian Arab militants, who infiltrated to Israel from Jordan, throw hand grenades in all directions in the neighborhood of Katamon, in the heart of Jerusalem. No one was hurt.
- 12 October – Yehud attack: Armed Palestinian Arab militants, who infiltrated to Israel from Jordan, throw hand grenades into a home in the Yehud, killing two young children (a 3-year-old girl and a one-and-a-half-year old boy).

Notable Israeli military operations against Palestinian militancy targets

The most prominent Israeli military counter-terrorism operations (military campaigns and military operations) carried out against Palestinian militants during 1953 include:

- 25 February – Al Burj: An IDF patrol shoot dead and mutilate bodies of five shepherds. Sheep numbering 177 confiscated.
- 28 February – Near Bayt Jibrin: IDF execute five smugglers from the Gaza Strip.
- February – 12 March to 15 infiltrators from the Gaza Strip killed when they trigger a 50 kg TNT booby-trap while trying to steal water pipelines near Yad Mordechai.
- 22 April – IDF snipers in West Jerusalem open fire across the armistice line killing six.
- 11 August – Armoured 7th Brigade kill 6 in a wide-ranging attack around Surif, Wadi Fukin and Beit Aula.
- 28 August – Unit 101's first combat operation. An attack on Bureij refugee camp kills 20 refugees including 7 women and five children.

== Unspecified dates ==
The following events took place during 1953 (dates not specified):

- The founding of the moshav Avital.
- The founding of the moshav Brosh.
- The founding of the moshav Dishon.
- The founding of the moshav Menuha.
- The founding of the city Migdal HaEmek.
- The founding of the moshav Mlilot.
- The founding of the community settlement Neve Monosson.
- The founding of the moshav Pa'amei Tashaz.
- The founding of the moshav Sde Tzvi.
- The founding of the moshav Ta'ashur.
- The founding of the moshav Talmei Bilu.
- The founding of the moshav Tidhar.
- The founding of the moshav Yad Natan.
- The founding of the moshav Yuval.
- The founding of the moshav Zru'a.

== Births ==
- 7 January – Uri Savir, Israeli diplomat and politician (died 2022).
- 31 March – Ehud Banai, Israeli singer.
- 5 April – Raleb Majadele, Israeli Arab politician who became Israel's first Muslim minister.
- 11 April – Adi Talmor, Israeli journalist and news presenter (died 2011).
- 14 June – Hana Laszlo, Israeli actress and comedian.
- 29 December – Gali Atari, Israeli singer.
- Undated
  - Shuka Glotman, mixed-media artist.

== See also ==
- 1953 in Israeli music
- 1953 in Israeli sport
