= Shuka (disambiguation) =

Shuka, Śuka, or Sukadeva, was a rishi (legendary sage) in Hinduism.

Shuka may also refer to:

== People ==
- Yehoshua Dorfman (1950–2014), Called "Shuka", an Israeli military officer
- Shuka Glotman (born 1953), a mixed-media artist
- Shuka Oyama (小山 修加; born 1980), Japanese volleyball player
- Shuka Saitō (斉藤 朱夏; born 1980), Japanese voice actress and singer
- Agim Shuka, (1942–1992) famous Albanian actor.
- Orli Shuka, (born 1976), British Albanian actor.

== Others ==
- Shuka (studio), a Japanese animation studio founded in 2013
- Shūka Sho, a Grade 1 flat horse race in Japan
- Shúkà, a cloth wrap, usually brightly colored, used among the Masaai people of Africa
