= 1952 in Israel =

- Decades: 1930s; 1940s; 1950s; 1960s; 1970s
- See also: History of Israel; Timeline of Israeli history; List of years in Israel

Events in the year 1952 in Israel

== Incumbents ==
- Prime Minister of Israel – David Ben-Gurion (Mapai)
- President of Israel – Chaim Weizmann until 9 November, (Yosef Sprinzak, acting president 9 November to 16 December), Yitzhak Ben-Zvi from 16 December
- President of the Supreme Court – Moshe Smoira
- Chief of General Staff - Yigal Yadin until 7 December, Mordechai Maklef
- Government of Israel - 3rd Government of Israel until 24 December, 4th Government of Israel

== Events ==
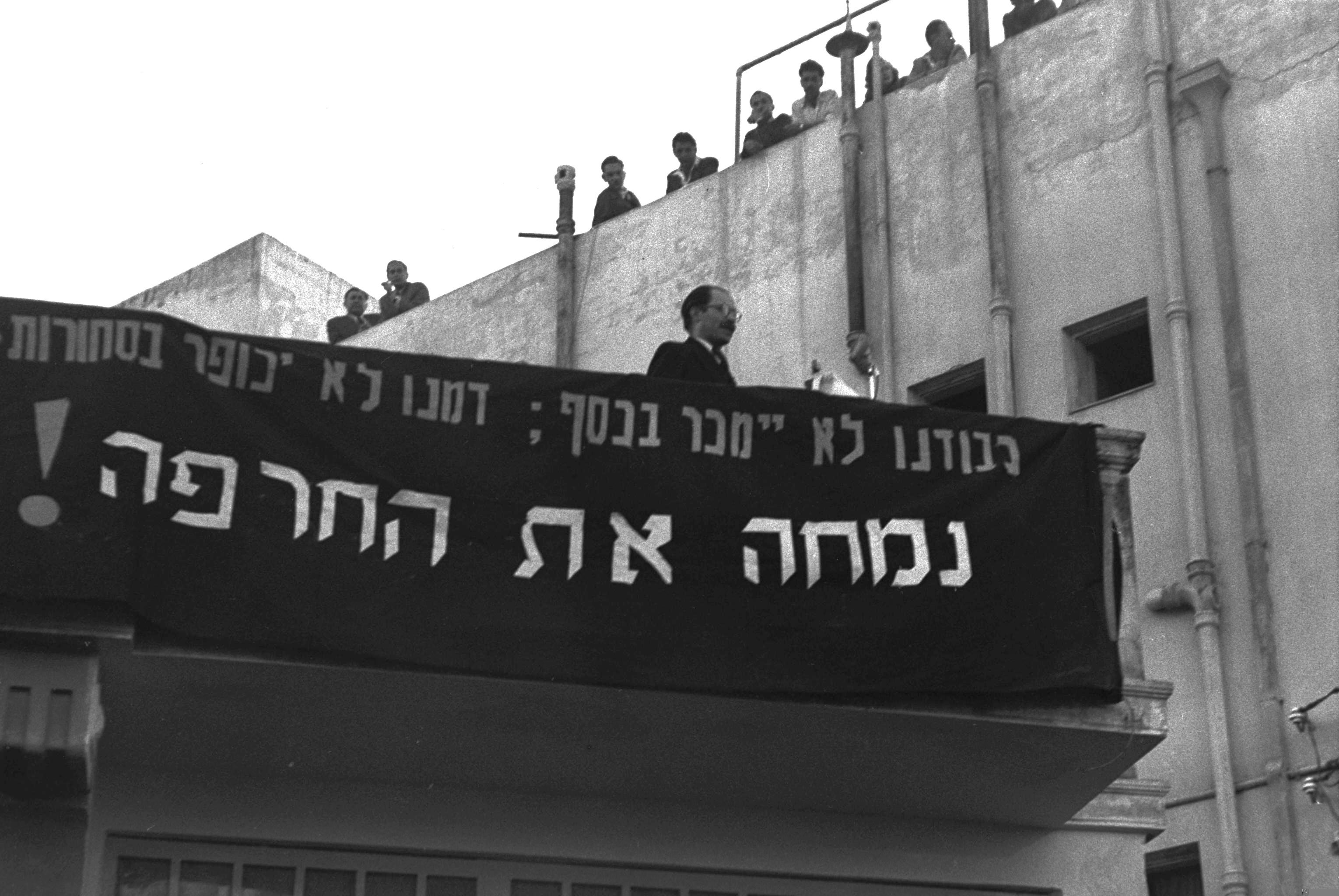
Menachem Begin protesting against the Reparations Agreement between Israel and West Germany in March 1952. The sign reads: "Our honor shall not be sold for money; Our blood shall not be atoned by goods. We Shall wipe out the disgrace!".

- 9 January – The Knesset approves the Reparations Agreement between Israel and West Germany.
- 4 April – In the Hague Tribunal, Israel demands reparations worth $3 billion from Germany.
- 14 July - 1952 Status Law: The Israel Status Law of 1952, also known as Amendment No. 2 to the Law of Return, was passed to clarify the law's provisions. While the original Law of Return granted Jews the right to immigrate, the Status Law aimed to establish who could be recognized as a Jew for the purpose of immigration and citizenship.
- 10 September – The Reparations Agreement between Israel and West Germany is signed. According to the Agreement, West Germany was to pay Israel for the slave labor and persecution of Jews during the Holocaust, and to compensate for Jewish property that was stolen by the Nazis.
- 9 November – President Chaim Weizmann dies in office and Yosef Sprinzak, Speaker of the Knesset, becomes acting president pending the election and inauguration of a new president.
- 1 December - Israel submits to General Assembly the "Blue Print for Peace in the Middle East."
- 7 December – Mordechai Maklef is appointed as the third Chief of Staff of the Israel Defense Forces.
- 8 December – In the 1952 Presidential Election, the Knesset elects Yitzhak Ben-Zvi as President of Israel, on the third-round ballot. His opponents are Mordechai Nurock, Yitzhak Gruenbaum and Peretz Bernstein.
- 16 December – Yitzhak Ben-Zvi assumes office as the second president of the State of Israel.
- 24 December – David Ben-Gurion presents his cabinet for a Knesset "Vote of Confidence". The 4th Government is approved that day and the members were sworn in.

=== Israeli–Palestinian conflict ===
The most prominent events related to the Israeli–Palestinian conflict which occurred during 1952 include:

- 6 January – 1952 Beit Jala Raid: an attack committed by an unknown Israeli party who blew up several houses in the West Bank town Beit Jala, killing between six and seven Palestinian-Arabs, including two children. According to leaflets distributed in the scene of the crime, the attack was carried out in retaliation for the rape and murder of a Jewish girl on 4 December 1951. Israel denied involvement in what it called "this sad affair", and voted to condemn the raid.

Notable Palestinian militant operations against Israeli targets

The most prominent Palestinian fedayeen terror attacks committed against Israelis during 1952 include:

- 1 January – Seven armed Palestinian Arab militants attack and kill a 19-year-old girl in her home, in the Beit Yisrael neighborhood of Jerusalem.
- 14 July – Five Israeli watchmen killed by Bedouin at Timna.

Notable Israeli military operations against Palestinian militancy targets

The most prominent Israeli military counter-terrorism operations (military campaigns and military operations) carried out against Palestinian militants during 1952 include:

- 6 January – Fifteen bedouin killed by an Israeli armoured infantry attack on their camp near Bureij Refugee Camp.

== Unspecified dates ==
The following events took place during 1952 (dates not specified):

- The founding of the moshav Bareket.
- The founding of the moshav Givolim.
- The founding of the kibbutz Lahav.
- The founding of the moshav Orot.
- The founding of the moshav Sde Yitzhak.
- The founding of the moshav Shibolim.

== Notable births ==
- 22 June - Ohad Naharin, choreographer
- 16 April – Esther Roth-Shahamorov, former Israeli track and field athlete.
- 1 May – Uzi Cohen, Israeli Likud politician (died 2008).
- 9 June – Uzi Hitman, Israeli singer, songwriter, composer and television personality (died 2004)
- 29 December – Efron Etkin, Israeli actor and voice actor (died 2012)

== Notable deaths ==
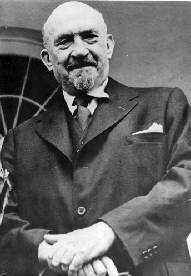
Chaim Weizmann

- 14 August – David-Zvi Pinkas (born 1895), Austro-Hungarian-born Zionist activist and Israeli politician.
- 21 August – Yitzhak Sadeh (born 1890), Russian (Polish)-born commander of the Palmach and one of the founders of the Israel Defense Forces at the time of the establishment of the State of Israel.
- 9 November – Chaim Weizmann (born 1874), Russian-born first President of Israel.
- Full date unknown – Zeev Ben-Zvi (born 1904), Russian (Polish)-born Israeli sculptor.

== See also ==
- 1952 in Israeli film
- 1952 in Israeli music
- 1952 in Israeli sport
- Israel at the 1952 Summer Olympics
