= 1956 in Israel =

- Decades: 1930s; 1940s; 1950s; 1960s; 1970s
- See also: History of Israel; Timeline of Israeli history; List of years in Israel

Events in the year 1956 in Israel.

== Incumbents ==
- Prime Minister of Israel – David Ben-Gurion (Mapai)
- President of Israel – Yitzhak Ben-Zvi
- President of the Supreme Court – Yitzhak Olshan
- Chief of General Staff – Moshe Dayan
- Government of Israel – 7th Government of Israel

== Events ==
- 2 February – The IDF prevents the Egyptian delegation from attending the Egypt-Israel Mixed Armistice Commission meeting at al-Auja, in the de-militarized zone.
- 29 March – After 15 months in the Syrian captivity, four IDF soldiers of the Golani Brigade return to Israel in exchange for 41 Syrian prisoners. A fifth IDF soldier, Uri Ilan, had committed suicide in captivity. Uri Ilan's remains are later returned to Israel.
- 5 April – IDF launch an intensive 120 mm mortar attack on Gaza town centre, killing 58 civilians: 33 men, 15 women and 10 children.
- 1 May – Finance Minister, Levi Eshkol, approves the establishment of the city of Ashdod.
- 8 May – Israel and Austria establish diplomatic relations.
- 6 June – Tel Aviv University is founded.
- 26 July – President Gamal Abdel Nasser of Egypt announces the nationalization of the Suez Canal and Egyptian forces seize control of the canal, moves that precipitate the Suez Crisis and the Sinai Campaign.
- 13 September – Operation Gulliver: IDF operation in Jordan in which a small paratroop force stormed the fort at Gharandal, on the TransJordan-Negev border, killing at least 9 policemen and members of the Jordanian camel corps. One IDF member was killed and 12 wounded.
- 10 October – Operation Samaria (מבצע שומרון): Following the constant infiltrations from the Jordanian-controlled West Bank, and following the series of attacks by the Jordanian army on Israeli soldiers and civilians, IDF forces raid the Qalqilya police forces. 100 Jordanian soldiers and 17 IDF soldiers are killed during the operation.
- 22 October – Israel, Britain and France secretly meet in Sèvres, France, and make plans to invade Egypt.
- 29 October – Kafr Qasim massacre: Israeli Border Police shoot and kill 48 Arab civilians for unknowingly disobeying curfew orders imposed by the Israeli army in Kafr Qasim.

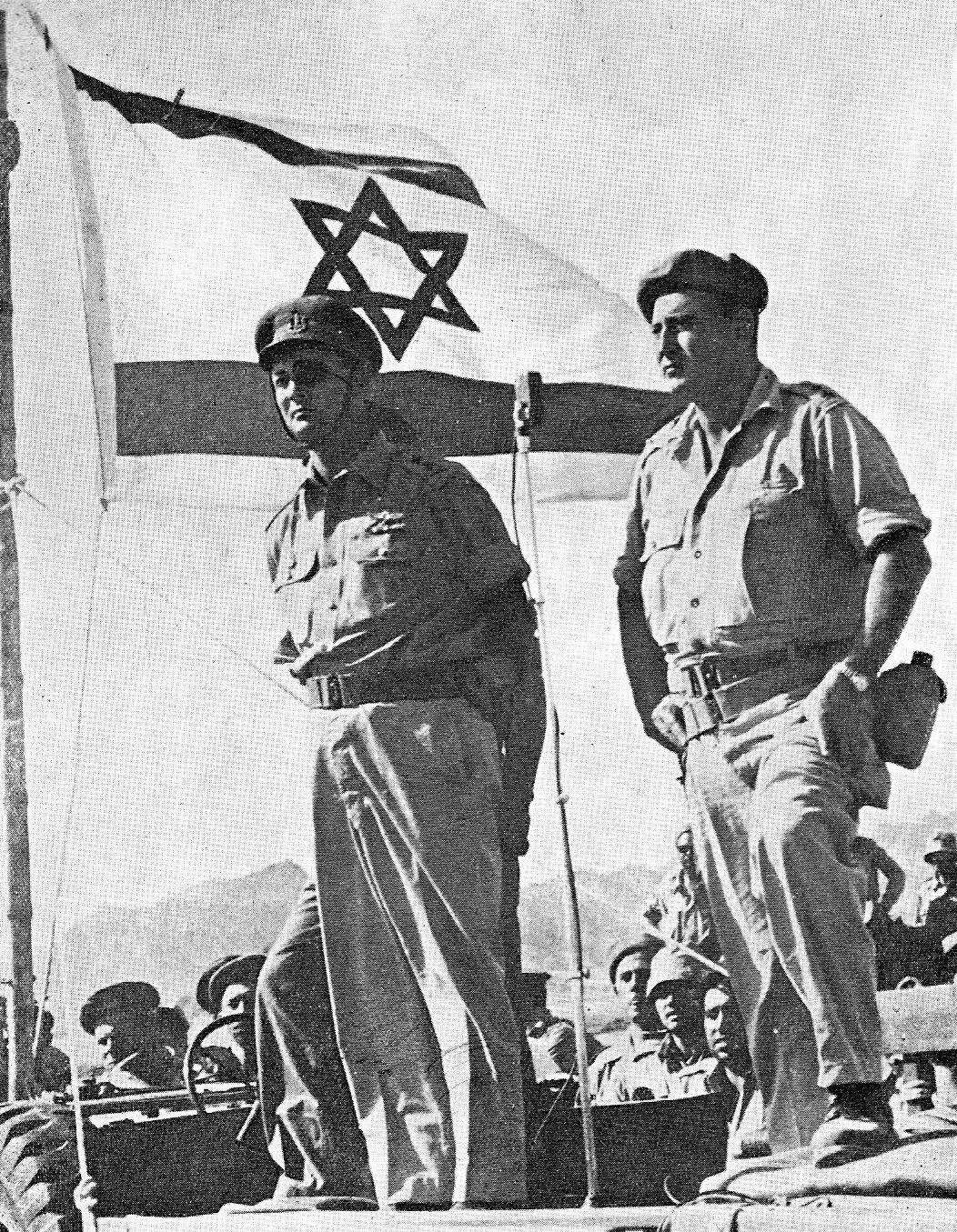
Ramatkal Moshe Dayan and Avraham Yoffe, commanding officers of IDF's 9th Oded Brigade at Sharm el-Sheikh after Operation Kadesh

Suez Crisis:

- 29 October – Israel invades the Sinai Peninsula and push Egyptian forces back toward the Suez Canal.
- 2 November – the Gaza Strip was occupied by Israel.
- 3 November – UN observers report 275 killed in Khan Yunis.
- 4 November – Israel captured the Straits of Tiran.
- 5 November – Sharm el-Sheikh was occupied by Israel and as a result the Gulf of Aqaba was reopened.
- 7 November – The United Nations General Assembly adopted a resolution calling for the United Kingdom, France and Israel to immediately withdraw their troops from Egypt.

=== Israeli–Palestinian conflict ===
The most prominent events related to the Israeli–Palestinian conflict which occurred during 1956 include:

Notable Palestinian militant operations against Israeli targets

The most prominent Palestinian fedayeen terror attacks committed against Israelis during 1956 include:

- 7 April – Armed Palestinian Arab militants, who infiltrated into Israel, throw three hand grenades into a house in Ashkelon, killing an Israeli woman.
- 11 April – Shafir shooting attack: Armed Palestinian Arab militants, who infiltrated into Israel, entered a synagogue in the village Shafir and open fire at 46 children aged 9–16. Three children and an instructor were killed in the incident. Five children were injured, three of them in serious condition.
- 29 April - Nahal Oz Ambush: Egyptian infiltrators ambushed and killed 21-year-old Ro'i Rothberg, returning his bullet-riddled and mutilated body on the same day.
- 16 August – Eilat bus ambush: an Israeli civilian bus was ambushed by a Fedayeen squad. Four passengers were killed and three were injured during the attack.
- 12 September – Ein Ofarim killings: a Palestinian Fedayeen squad infiltrated into Israel and stabbed to death three Druze guardsmen in the Ein Ofarim facility near the village Hatzeva.
- 23 September – Ramat Rachel shooting attack Armed Palestinian Arab militants opened fire from a Jordanian position, and killed four archaeologists, and wounded sixteen others, near kibbutz Ramat Rachel.
- 4 October – Negev desert road ambush: A squad of 10 armed Palestinian Arab militants, who infiltrated into Israel from Jordan, ambush and kill five Israeli construction workers in Sdom.
- 9 October – Armed Palestinian Arab militants, who infiltrated into Israel from Jordan, kill two Israeli workers in an orchard near the Israeli youth village Neve Hadassah and cut off their ears.
- 8 November – Armed Palestinian Arab militants opened fire on a train, attacked cars and blew up wells, in the North and Center of Israel. Six Israelis were wounded.

Notable Israeli military operations against Palestinian militancy targets

The most prominent Israeli military counter-terrorism operations (military campaigns and military operations) carried out against Palestinian militants during 1956 include:

- 11/12 September – Operation Jonathon (מבצע יהונתן): Following an attack carried out by the Arab Legion troops on IDF soldiers training in Beit Govrin in which attack killed eight academic reserve medical students were killed, The next day Israeli IDF forces were sent to carry out a reprisal raid in the Khirbet al Rahwa police fort, on the Hebron-Beersheba road (then under the control of Jordan). Over twenty Jordanian soldiers and policemen were killed in the raid.
- 25 September – Operation Lulav (מבצע לולב): Following the murder of the participants in an archaeological conference held in Ramat Rachel and the murder of two farmers from Moshav Aminadav and Kibbutz Maoz Haim, IDF forces raid the police fort at Husan, near Bethlehem, in the West Bank (then under the control of Jordan). Thirty-seven Legionnaires and National Guardsmen were killed as well as two civilians. Nine IDF members were also killed.

=== Unknown dates ===
- The founding of the city Ashdod.
- The founding of the moshav Even Shmuel.
- The founding of the Local council Mitzpe Ramon.
- The founding of the town Netivot.

== Notable births ==
- 16 February – Rina Mor, the first Israeli Miss Universe winner.
- 8 June – Oded Machnes, former Israeli footballer.
- 29 December – Yehudit Ravitz, Israeli singer and composer.

== Notable deaths ==
- 12 February – Ezriel Carlebach (born 1909), German-born Israeli journalist and publicist, founder and editor of the Israeli daily tabloid "Ma'ariv".
- 25 February – Jacob Levitzki (born 1904), Russian (Ukraine)-born Israeli mathematician.
- 10 December – David Shimoni (born 1891), Russian-born Israeli poet and writer.

== Major public holidays ==
Holidays and Observances (1956):

- Feb 26 Adar 14 Purim
- Mar 26 Nisan 14 Passover Eve
- Mar 27 Nisan 15 Passover (Day 1)
- Mar 28 Nisan 16 Passover (Day 2)
- Mar 29 Nisan 17 Passover (Day 3)
- Mar 30 Nisan 18 Passover (Day 4)
- Mar 31 Nisan 19 Passover (Day 5)
- Apr 1 Nisan 20 Passover (Day 6)
- Apr 2 Nisan 21 Passover (Day 7)
- Apr 8 Nisan 27 Yom HaShoah
- Apr 16 Iyar 5 Yom HaAtzmaut
- Apr 29 Iyar 18 Lag BaOmer
- May 9 Iyar 28 Jerusalem Day
- May 15 Sivan 5 Shavuot Eve
- May 16 Sivan 6 Shavuot
- Jul 16 Av 8 Tisha B'Av Eve
- Jul 17 Av 9 Tisha B'Av
- Sep 5 Elul 29 Rosh Hashana Eve
- Sep 6 Tishri 1 Rosh Hashana
- Sep 7 Tishri 2 Rosh Hashana (Day 2)
- Sep 14 Tishri 9 Yom Kippur Eve
- Sep 15 Tishri 10 Yom Kippur Sep 19 Tishri 14 Sukkot Eve
- Sep 20 Tishri 15 Sukkot (Day 1)
- Sep 21 Tishri 16 Sukkot (Day 2)
- Sep 22 Tishri 17 Sukkot (Day 3)
- Sep 23 Tishri 18 Sukkot (Day 4)
- Sep 24 Tishri 19 Sukkot (Day 5)
- Sep 25 Tishri 20 Sukkot (Day 6)
- Sep 26 Tishri 21 Sukkot (Day 7) / Hoshanah Rabah
- Sep 27 Tishri 22 Shemini Atzeret / Simchat Torah
- Nov 29 Kislev 25 Hanukkah (Day 1)
- Nov 30 Kislev 26 Hanukkah (Day 2)
- Dec 1 Kislev 27 Hanukkah (Day 3)
- Dec 2 Kislev 28 Hanukkah (Day 4)
- Dec 3 Kislev 29 Hanukkah (Day 5)
- Dec 4 Kislev 30 Hanukkah (Day 6)
- Dec 5 Tevet 1 Hanukkah (Day 7)
- Dec 6 Tevet 2 Hanukkah (Day 8)

== See also ==
- 1956 in Israeli film
- 1956 in Israeli music
- 1956 in Israeli sport
- Israel at the 1956 Summer Olympics
