= 1949 in Israel =

- Decades: 1920s; 1930s; 1940s; 1950s; 1960s
- See also: History of Israel; Timeline of Israeli history; List of years in Israel

Events in the year 1949 in Israel.

== Incumbents ==
- Prime Minister of Israel – David Ben-Gurion (Mapai)
- President of Israel – Chaim Weizmann (until 17 February, President (or Chairman) of the Provisional State Council)
- President of the Supreme Court – Moshe Smoira
- Chief of General Staff – Yaakov Dori until 9 November, Yigal Yadin
- Government of Israel – 1st Government of Israel, from 10 May

== Events ==
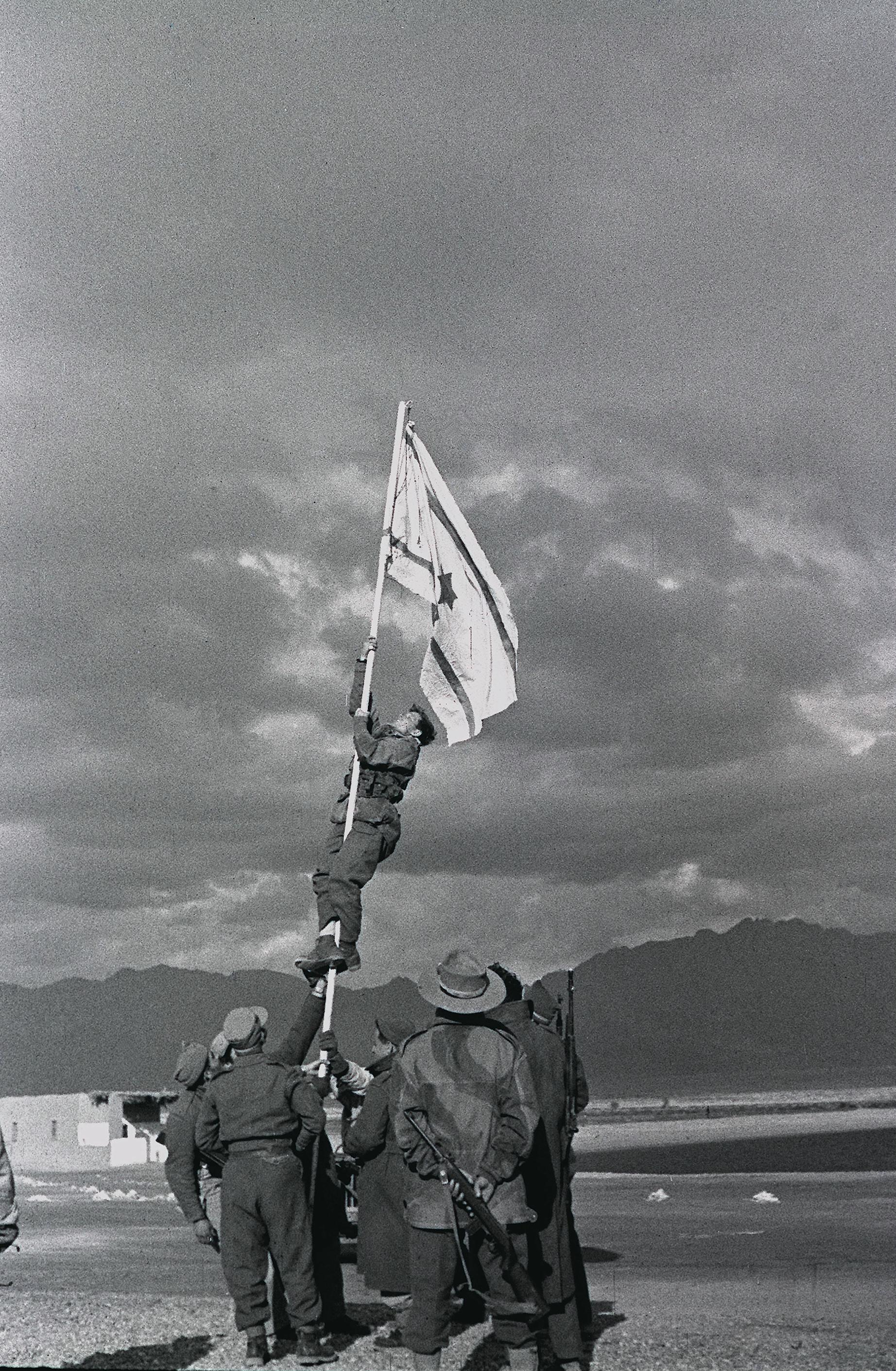
Israeli soldiers raise the Ink Flag at Umm Rashrash (now Eilat), marking the end of the 1948 Arab–Israeli War

- 7 January – Operation Horev ends. On the same day, the Israeli Air Force and ground forces shoot down five Royal Air Force fighter planes and severely damage another in two incidents over the Sinai Peninsula, after mistaking them for Egyptian planes. Two pilots are killed during the incident.
- 24 January – The British begin sending the final group of 11,000 illegal Jewish immigrants who were still being held in internment camps on Cyprus, mainly men of military age, to Israel.
- 25 January – The first Israeli legislative election is held in which David Ben-Gurion becomes Prime Minister.
- 31 January – The United States grants de jure recognition to the State of Israel.
- 11 February – The last detainees of the Cyprus internment camps depart for Israel.
- 14 February – The Knesset (Israeli parliament) convenes for the first time.
- 16 February – In the first Israeli Presidential Election, the Knesset elects Chaim Weizmann (the temporary head of state as head of the Provisional State Council), as President of Israel, by a majority of 83 to 15 votes caste in favour of his opponent, Joseph Klausner. He assumes office the following day as the first president of the State of Israel.
- 24 February – The armistice agreement between Israel and Egypt is signed in Rhodes.
- 5 March – Israel launches Operation Ovda with the objective of capturing the southern Negev desert.
- 10 March – The Israel Defense Forces reach Umm Rashrash, west of Aqaba (the biblical Elath), and capture it without a battle. The Negev Brigade and Golani Brigade takes part in the operation. To symbolize their victory, they raise the Ink Flag, a makeshift flag created from a white sheet and a bottle of ink.
- 23 March – The armistice agreement between Israel and Lebanon is signed.
- 3 April – The armistice agreement between Israel and Jordan is signed in Rhodes.
- 26 April – Austerity is introduced to cope with a lack of foreign currency reserves and a mass influx of Jewish immigrants.
- 27 April – Opening of the Lausanne Conference, established by the United Nations with the aim of reaching a comprehensive peace agreement between Israel and Arab countries.
- 11 May – Israel is admitted to the United Nations as its 59th member.
- 20 July – Israel and Syria sign a truce to end their 19-month war.

Post-war:

- 17 August – The remains of Theodor Herzl are buried in Mount Herzl in Jerusalem.
- 4 October – The Israeli government decides to incorporate Jaffa into Tel Aviv, although actual unification would be delayed for months due to opposition from Tel Aviv's mayor Israel Rokach.
- 8 September – The Knesset passes the Defense Service Law, providing for a period of mandatory military service for citizens.
- 9 November – Yigael Yadin is appointed as the second Chief of Staff of the Israel Defense Forces, succeeding Yaakov Dori.
- 5 December – Prime Minister Ben-Gurion proclaims Jerusalem as Israel's capital.
- 13 December – The Mossad is established as the "Central Institute for Coordination". On the same day, the Knesset votes to transfer the seat of government to Jerusalem from Tel Aviv.
- 26 December – The first Knesset meeting in Jerusalem is held, inside the Jewish Agency building.
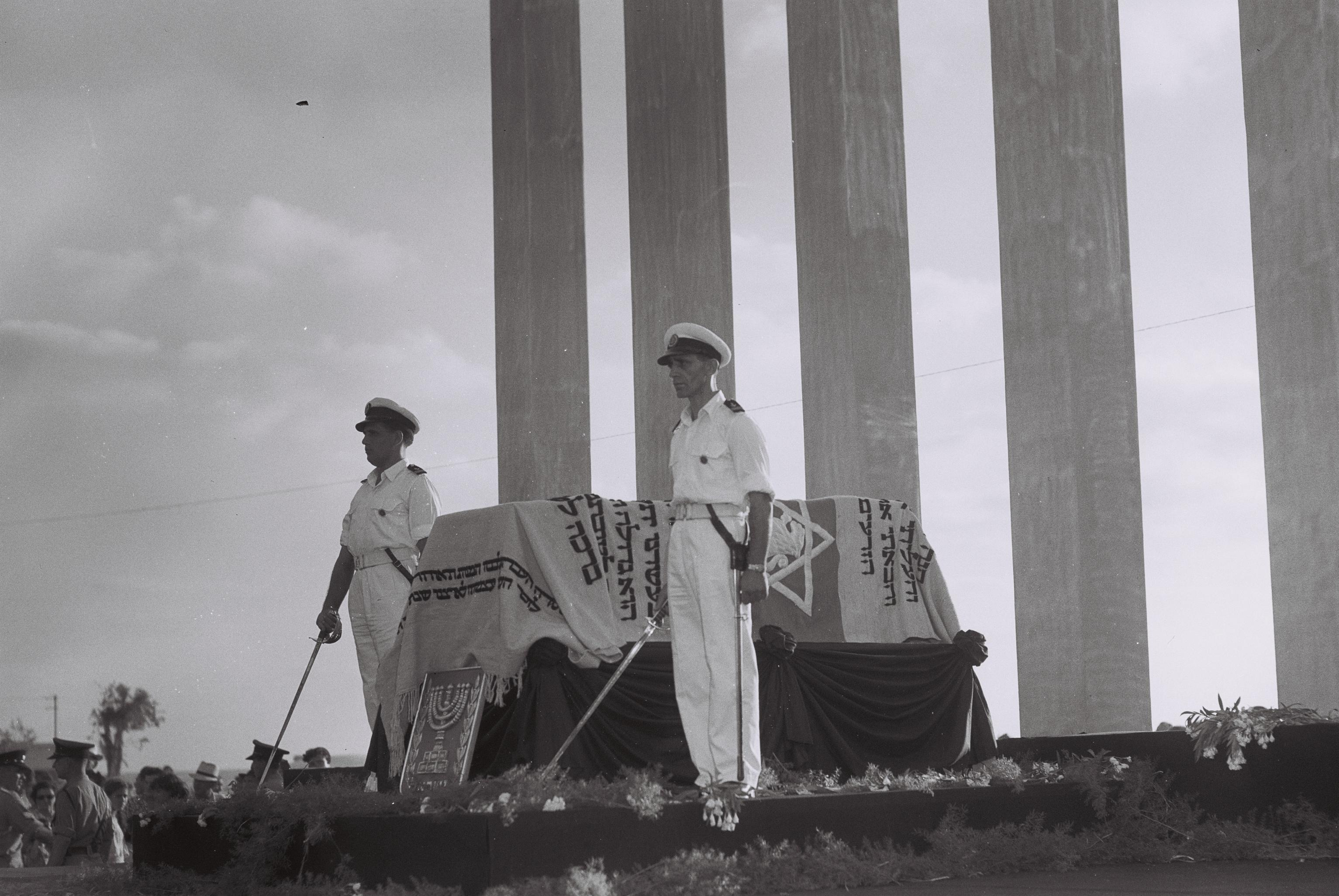
Honor guard stands beside Herzl's coffin in Israel, August 1949

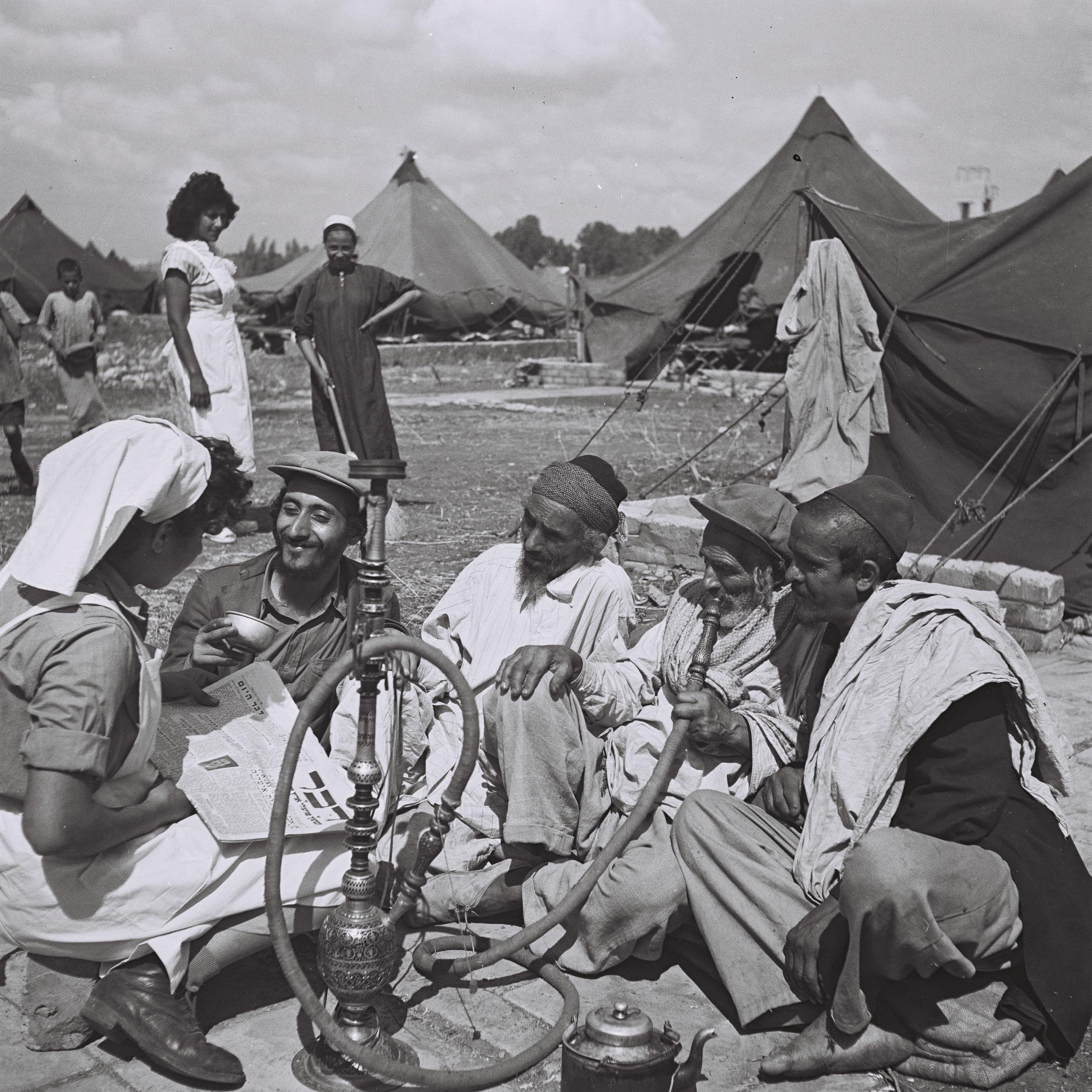
Yemenite immigrants in Rosh HaAyin camp, 1 October 1949

=== Israeli–Palestinian conflict ===
The most prominent events related to the Israeli–Palestinian conflict which occurred during 1949 include:

- 20 March – 50 Israeli soldiers order 1,800 civilians to leave the village of Beit 'Awwa. UN report 7,000 people driven out of area west of Dura.
- 31 March – An Israeli command car is ambushed near Al Qubeiba. All four occupants are killed.
- 20 April – 12 Israeli soldiers are killed in a clash with Arab infiltrators in the Lakhish region.
- September – Ar Reina: IDF troops execute 14 Bedouin and one woman suspected of smuggling.
- 7 October – Four killed by an Israeli mortar attack on Beit Hanun
- 2 November – 2,000 Bedouin expelled from the Beersheba area to West Bank.

=== Unknown dates ===
- The founding of the moshav Arbel
- The founding of the moshav Aviel
- The founding of the moshav Azaria
- The founding of the kibbutz Bar'am
- The founding of the kibbutz Barkai
- The founding of the moshav Be'erotayim
- The founding of the moshav Beit Gamliel
- The founding of the kibbutz Beit Guvrin
- The founding of the kibbutz Beit HaEmek
- The founding of the kibbutz Beit Kama
- The founding of the city Beit She'an
- The founding of the moshav Beit Zeit
- The founding of the moshav Ben Ami
- The founding of the moshav Bnei Darom
- The founding of the kibbutz Bnei Re'em
- The founding of the moshav Burgata
- The founding of the moshav Ein Ayala
- The founding of the moshav Elifelet
- The founding of the moshav Elkosh
- The founding of the kibbutz Erez
- The founding of the kibbutz Gadot
- The founding of the local council Ganei Tikva
- The founding of the kibbutz Gesher HaZiv
- The founding of the moshav Gilat
- The founding of the moshav HaBonim
- The founding of the moshav Hagor
- The founding of the kibbutz HaOn
- The founding of the kibbutz HaSolelim
- The founding of the moshav Hatzav
- The founding of the kibbutz Kabri
- The founding of the moshav Kfar HaNagid
- The re-establishment of the moshav Kfar Uria
- The founding of the kibbutz Lahavot Haviva
- The founding of the kibbutz Lavi
- The founding of the moshav Liman
- The founding of the kibbutz Lohamey HaGeta'ot
- The founding of the kibbutz Magen
- The founding of the kibbutz Mefalsim
- The founding of the kibbutz Nave Yair
- The founding of the kibbutz Neve Ur
- The founding of the moshav Nir Galim
- The founding of the kibbutz Nir Yitzhak
- The founding of the kibbutz Palmachim
- The founding of the moshav Ramot Meir
- The founding of the kibbutz Re'im
- The founding of the city Rosh HaAyin
- The founding of the kibbutz Rosh HaNikra
- The founding of the moshav Tifrah
- The founding of the moshav Tirat Yehuda
- The founding of the moshav Tzippori
- The founding of the city of Yavne
- The founding of the kibbutz Zikim

== Notable births ==
- 21 January – Shlomo Gronich, Israeli musician.
- 24 February – Razi Barkai, Israeli media personality.
- 26 July – Yitzhak Ben Yisrael, Israeli military scientist, general, and politician.
- 21 August – Daniel Sivan, Israeli academic
- 25 August – Gene Simmons, Israeli-American musician, lead singer and bass guitarist of Kiss.
- 12 October – Galila Ron-Feder Amit, Israeli author.
- 21 October – Benjamin Netanyahu, Prime Minister of Israel
- 28 October – Sandra Sade, Israeli actress
- 2 November – Miki Gavrielov, Israeli musician
- 24 November – Shosh Atari, Israeli radio presenter and actress (died 2008).
- 26 November – Shlomo Artzi, Israeli singer.
- 30 November – Matti Caspi, Israeli singer (died 2026).
- 25 December – Miri Aloni, Israeli singer.
- 28 December – Rachel Elior, Israeli academic, professor of Jewish philosophy

== Notable deaths ==
- Yitzhaq Shami (born 1888), writer, one of the first modern Hebrew literature writers in Palestine
- Meir Bar-Ilan (born 1880), rabbi, leader of the Mizrachi movement
- Elisheva Bikhovski (born 1888), Russian-Israeli poet, writer, literary critic and translator

== See also ==
- 1949 in Israeli film
