= 1957 in Israel =

- Decades: 1930s; 1940s; 1950s; 1960s; 1970s
- See also: History of Israel; Timeline of Israeli history; List of years in Israel

Events in the year 1957 in Israel.

== Incumbents ==
- Prime Minister of Israel – David Ben-Gurion (Mapai)
- President of Israel – Yitzhak Ben-Zvi
- President of the Supreme Court – Yitzhak Olshan
- Chief of General Staff – Moshe Dayan
- Government of Israel – 7th Government of Israel

== Events ==
- 15 January – The trial of 11 Israel Border Police officers and soldiers for their actions during the Kafr Qasim massacre begins.
- 18 January – Two students, Gideon Hollin and Shifra Rabinowitz, goes missing near Jerusalem. It was found that the two were captured by Jordanian soldiers when they accidentally crossed the border near Talpiot. Rabinowitz were returned to Israel on 28 January and Hollin was returned on 5 March.
- 22 January – Israel withdraws from the Sinai Peninsula (captured from Egypt on 29 October 1956 during the Suez Crisis), keeping forces in the Gaza Strip and along the eastern shore of the peninsula.
- 4 March – A few minutes past midnight, Israel Kastner is shot outside his house by Ze'ev Eckstein (who pulled the trigger), Dan Shemer and Yosef Menkes. All three were former members of the pre-state right-wing underground Jewish militant group Lehi. Kastner dies of his injuries twelve days later.
- 24 March – Bodies of 4 youngsters are returned from Jordan to Israel. The four set out from Be'er Menucha on 18 March and attempted to reach Petra by foot, but were killed by Bedouins during the journey.
- 6 April – Hapoel Tel Aviv wins the football league title, despite losing 0–2 to Maccabi Tel Aviv in the Tel Aviv derby, as championship rival Hapoel Petah Tikva loses 1–2 to Beitar Tel Aviv.
- 13 April – 16 people were wounded at Basa Stadium, Hapoel Tel Aviv's ground, as an unfinished terrace on which they were sitting collapsed.
- 10 May – A strike breaks out in the ATA Textile factory, after failed negotiations between the owners and the workers' representatives over the terms of the workers' collective agreement and the management intent to fire a percentage of the workers. Despite the attempt of government involvement in ending the dispute, including an offer to transfer the matter to the personal mediation of PM Ben-Gurion, the strike is held until 19 August, when an agreement is signed between the factory's management and the workers' representatives from the Histadrut.
- 1 June – Maccabi Tel Aviv wins the Basketball League title after beating their nearest rival, Hapoel Tel Aviv 88–44.
- 3 June – Soldier Yitzhak Kayam is returned from Jordan through the Mandelbaum Gate. Kayam was captured by fedayeen on 5 January 1957 near Kfar Truman and was imprisoned and interrogated in Jordan.
- 20 June – Youngster Margalit Shimoni is returned from Jordan after 80 days in captivity. Shimoni went missing on 1 April near kibbutz Lahav. According to Shimoni, she was captured by Jordanian forces when she mistakenly crossed the border while searching for the kibbutz's shepherd, although other sources linked her disappearance to a row she had with her boyfriend.
- 6 July – Hapoel Petah Tikva wins the Football State Cup, as it beats Maccabi Jaffa 2–1 in the final.
- 22 July – An Israeli journalist, Rafi Ayalon, is detained by Egypt on board the Danish ship Brigitte Toft. Ayalon was listed as a crew member and was arrested by the Egyptians as the ship was about to enter the Suez Canal. Ayalon is held by the Egyptians until 14 August.
- 8 August – 5 prisoners break out of the Tel Mond Prison as they are left unguarded and escape through the prison's roof. Three are apprehended a short time after which, near the prison, while two, Eliyahu Hadad and Itzhak (Zaki) Shem Tov, elude the police and hide out in Tel Aviv. Hadad is caught in Tel Aviv on 19 August and Shem Tov is caught on 27 August, on the beach near Dan Hotel, as he was bathing in the sea. Shem Tov was hiding in a makeshift tent near Ayalon River, and used women's clothes and wig to disguise himself while on the loose.
- 11 August – Kibbutz Beit Nir is founded.
- 26 August – kibbutz Or HaNer is founded.
- 31 August – Two newly arrived immigrants from Mle'a, Shlomo Zilberman and Zigmunt Levy, walking to nearby Givat Oz, stray from their path and cross the 1949 Armistice Agreement Line near Zububa. The two are captured by local villagers who deliver them to the armed forces. The two are returned to Israel on 10 September.
- 12 September – El Al receives its first Bristol Britannia airplane, one of four ordered.
- 15 September – With a ceremony held at Ramat Gan Stadium, the 1957 Maccabiah Games opens. The games' closing ceremony is held on 24 September.
- 17 September – 15 Children from the Arab village Sandala are killed while playing with a mortar shell which was fired but wasn't exploded during the 1948 Arab–Israeli War.
- 22 September – The fishing boat Doron is captured by Egyptian forces, who claim that the boat entered Egypt's territorial waters, and is led to Port Said. Its crew, 5 Israeli fishermen and its Italian captain, are interrogated by the Egyptians.
- 1 October – Heichal HaTarbut, the main concert hall in Tel Aviv, opens.
- 11 October – Hungarian actor Zoltán Greguss is detained by Tel Aviv police, facing accusations of molesting a 12-year-old girl. The arrest causes diplomatic stress between Israel and Hungary, leading to deportation of three Israeli diplomats from Budapest. The actor's trial was held during the second half of October and early November, and the court's verdict was given on 18 November, in which Greguss was acquitted.
- 28 October – In the 1957 Israeli presidential election, the Knesset re-elects incumbent Yitzhak Ben-Zvi, who ran unopposed, as President of Israel with 76 votes for and 16 abstaining.
- 29 October – Moshe Dwek, a 26-year-old Yemenite-Israeli mental patient throws a hand grenade in the Knesset. The grenade blast causes severe injuries to the Minister of Religious Affairs Haim-Moshe Shapira, and lightly wounds the prime minister David Ben-Gurion, Foreign Minister Golda Meir and the Minister of Transport Moshe Carmel.
- 1 November – The final gate is lifted in the dam blocking the Lake Hula, starting the final phase of the drainage of the lake towards the Sea of Galilee.
- 25 November – Bodies of 2 youngsters, Mordechai Tubi and Amiram Shai, are returned from Jordan to Israel. The two set out from Be'er Menucha on 20 November, trying to reach Petra by foot, but were killed by Jordanian-Bedouin soldiers during the journey.
- 27 November – In football, Moshe Varon is appointed as Israel national football team manager.
- 3 December – The Israeli Sports Betting Council is founded, as the Olympic Committee of Israel, the Israel Football Association and the Israel Sport Association establish a football pool. The first betting slips are published in the Israeli papers in the following week.
- 17 December – A dispute breaks out in within the government regarding intent to send an official delegation, headed by IDF Chief of Staff Moshe Dayan (whose name was prohibited for publication), to West Germany. The intent was made public by Ahdut HaAvoda ministers, who leaked the information to their party's newspaper, LaMerhav and to other evening papers. Following the leak, Prime Minister David Ben-Gurion demanded the resignation of Ahdut HaAvoda ministers, and, as Ahdut HaAvoda refused, Ben-Gurion resigned as Prime Minister on 31 December, ending the Seventh government of Israel.
- 23 December – Yotvata, previously a Nahal settlement (established 1951), becomes a permanent, civil settlement.

=== Israeli–Palestinian conflict ===
The most prominent events related to the Israeli–Palestinian conflict which occurred during 1957 include:

- 7 March – Israeli army withdraws from the Gaza Strip.

Notable Palestinian militant operations against Israeli targets

The most prominent Palestinian fedayeen terror attacks committed against Israelis during 1957 include:

- 18 February – Two Israeli civilians, Menachem Klug and Yeshaayahu Fein, are killed near kibbutz Nir Yitzhak. The two were conducting a seismological survey when their vehicle drove over a landmine.
- 8 March – Armed Palestinian Arab militants, who infiltrated into Israel, killed Shlomo Amsalem, a shepherd from kibbutz Beit Guvrin in a field near the kibbutz.
- 16 April – Armed Palestinian Arab militants, who infiltrated into Israel from the village of Faqqua, killed two guards, Yechezkel Beit Elgar (Idgadri) and Yamin (Binyamin) David-Hai at Kibbutz Mesilot. The militants also planted a landmine in a nearby field, which exploded when a tractor drove over it. The tractor driver was injured lightly.
- 20 May – Armed Bedouin militants set up an ambush for passing vehicles on the Eilat-Be'er Sheva road. The militants fired on three different vehicles between 18:15 and 21:00, killing one person, Israel Rottman, a passenger in the second vehicle (attacked at 19:30). Three were injured during the militants' last attack, during which army forces arrived to the location and the militants retreated back to Jordan.
- 29 May – A tractor driver, Eliezer Himmelfarb, was killed and two others wounded when the vehicle struck a landmine next to kibbutz Kissufim.
- 8 June – 2 Israeli civilians, Daniel Agron, son of Jerusalem mayor Gershon Agron, and future MK Avraham Katz were injured when their vehicle drove over a landmine near Nahal Oz.
- 16 June – A civilian, Engineer Misha Faktori, was killed by a Syrian sniper near Bnot Yaakov Bridge.
- 18 June – An Israeli civilian, Makhluf Abarjil, was killed near Eilat from a landmine explosion.
- 24 June – An Israeli civilian, Ra'aya Goldschmidt was killed in kibbutz Gadot as a Syrian Armed Forces Syrian Army unit attacked the kibbutz with machine gun fire.
- 9 July – One Israeli civilian, Kamus Ben Atiya, is killed and seven Israel Border Police guards are injured during a Syrian attack on Kibbutz Gonen.
- 23 August –Two guards of the Israeli Mekorot water company, Druze brothers Hamed Nasser and Fadallah Nasser, were killed near Kibbutz Beit Guvrin.
- 6 November – A policeman, Amram Haziza, was killed when Syrian forces attacked a group of workers in the fields near Kibbutz Tel Katzir.
- 24 November – A member of Kibbutz She'ar Yashuv, Yosef Ben-Haim was killed by Syrian soldiers in the Kibbutz fields.
- 21 December – A member of kibbutz Gadot, Betzalel Bobritzki, was killed by a Syrian soldier or soldiers in the Kibbutz fields while walking with his girlfriend.

Notable Israeli military operations against Palestinian militancy targets

The most prominent Israeli military counter-terrorism operations (military campaigns and military operations) carried out against Palestinian militants during 1957 include:

- 7 March – Israeli army withdraws from the Gaza Strip.

== Notable births ==
- 20 January – Moshe Kaplinsky, former Deputy Chief of the General Staff of the Israel Defense Forces
- 14 February – Raphael Kishon, writer, veterinarian, Green Party activist and Tel Aviv city council member, son of Ephraim Kishon.
- 26 February – Tzachi Hanegbi, politician.
- 10 March – Re'em Ha'Cohen, a rabbi, Rosh yeshiva of Yeshivat Otniel and Otniel Chief Rabbi.
- 24 April – Uri Malmilian, football manager and former football player.
- 14 May – Yitzhak Harel, CEO of Israel Railways and former major general in the IDF.
- 7 July – Berry Sakharof, rock guitarist, songwriter and singer.
- 24 July – Leah Shabat, singer and songwriter.
- 13 August – Yigal Ravid, radio and television presenter.
- 16 August – Eliezer Shkedi, general (aluf) in the Israel Defense Forces and a Commander in Chief of the Israeli Air Force. Later, CEO of the Israeli national airline, El Al
- 21 August – Yehiel Lasri, physician and politician, Mayor of Ashdod and former member of Knesset
- 5 September – Yair Naveh, former major general in the IDF and Deputy Chief of the General Staff
- 9 September – Shari Arison, American-born Israeli businesswoman and philanthropist
- 18 November – Elisha Levy, football manager and former football player.
- 19 November – Ofra Haza, singer, actress and international recording artist (died 2000).
- 11 December – Orly Silbersatz Banai, actress and singer
- 24 December – Danny Robas, singer.

== Notable deaths ==
- 15 March – Israel Kastner (born 1906), Hungarian-born Israeli journalist and lawyer who became known for helping Jews escape Nazi-occupied Hungary during the Holocaust.
- 8 April – Dr. Moshe Wallach (born 1866), German-born physician, founder of Shaare Zedek Hospital in Jerusalem.
- 12 April – Yoel Mastboym – (born 1882), Polish-born Yiddish writer.
- 13 May – Michael Fekete (born 1886), Austro-Hungarian (Vojvodina)-born Israeli mathematician.
- 16 June – Haim Ariav (born 1895), Russian-born Israeli politician.
- 18 June – Itzhak Shenhar (born 1902), Russian-born Israeli writer and poet.
- 24 June – Inna Govinska-Baraz (born 1894), Russian-born actress and singer, was a member of Habima Theatre since 1919.
- 24 June – Moshe Weizmann (born 1878), Russian-born Professor of Chemistry at the Hebrew University, brother of first Israeli president, Haim Weizmann.
- 4 July – Yechiel Weizmann (born 1892), Russian-born agronomist and Zionist activist, brother of first Israeli president, Haim Weizmann and father of 7th Israeli president Ezer Weizman.
- 10 July – Sholem Asch (born 1880), Polish-born Yiddish writer.
- 13 July – Shmuel Tajer (born 1868), Sofia-born merchant, one of the founders of Tel Aviv. Grandfather of MK Avraham Katz-Oz and grand-grandfather of MK Erel Margalit.
- 28 July – Isaac Heinemann (born 1876), German-born Israeli scholar and professor of classical literature
- 18 August – Aharon Rokeach (born 1880), fourth Rebbe of the Belz Hasidic dynasty.
- 25 August – Leo Perutz (born 1882), Austrian-born novelist and mathematician.
- 18 September – Meshulam Levontin, MD, Belarus-born physician, founder of Magen David Adom in Tel Aviv and head of the Hadasah Hospital in Tel Aviv.
- 17 October – Avraham Sharon (born 1878), Israeli philosopher, musician, scholar and publicist.
- 2 November – Col. Nehemiah Argov (born 1914), military aide to David Ben-Gurion.
- 4 November – Shoghi Effendi (born 1897), Guardian and appointed head of the Bahá'í Faith.
- 15 November – Moshe Ichilov (born 1903), Zionist activist, served as deputy mayor of Petah Tikva and of Tel Aviv.
- 19 November – Aba Cohen (born 1878), Founder of the Tel Aviv Volunteer Fire Brigade, the first Hebrew Fire Brigade.
- 28 November – Pinchas Churgin (born 1894), Professor of history and Jewish literature, President of the Mizrachi movement in the US, dean of Yeshiva University and founder and first president of Bar-Ilan University.
- 1 December – Zvi Ben-Haim (born 1898), Ukrainian-born actor, member of Habima.
- 30 December – Asher ze'ev Werner (born 1894), Ashkenazi Chief Rabbi of Tiberias, Chief Rabbi of Poalei Agudat Yisrael and a member of Moetzes Gedolei HaTorah.

== Major public holidays ==
- Tu Bishvat – 16 January
- Fast of Esther – 14 March
- Purim – nightfall, 17 March to nightfall, 18 March
- Passover and Chol HaMoed Pesach – sunset, 15 April to nightfall, 23 April (7th day) (an additional day is observed outside Israel)
- Holocaust Remembrance Day – nightfall, 28 April to nightfall, 29 April
- Yom Hazikaron – 5 May, 7 AM to nightfall
- Israel's Independence Day – nightfall, 5 May to nightfall, 6 May
- Lag Ba'omer – nightfall, 18 May to nightfall, 19 May
- Shavuot – sunset, 4 June to nightfall, 6 June (a second day is observed outside Israel)
- Ninth of Av fast – sunset, 6 August to nightfall, 7 August
- Rosh Hashanah – sunset, 25 September to nightfall, 27 September
- Yom Kippur – sunset, 4 October to nightfall, 5 October
- Sukkot and Chol HaMoed Sukkot – sunset, 9 October to sunset, 16 October
- Simchat Torah/Shemini Atzeret – sunset, 16 October to nightfall, 17 October (a second day is observed outside Israel)
- Hanukkah – Sunset, 17 December to nightfall, 25 December

== See also ==
- 1957 in Israeli music
- 1957 in Israeli sport
