= 1955 in Israel =

- Decades: 1930s; 1940s; 1950s; 1960s; 1970s
- See also: History of Israel; Timeline of Israeli history; List of years in Israel

Events in the year 1955 in Israel.

== Incumbents ==
- Prime Minister of Israel – Moshe Sharett (Mapai) until 3 November, David Ben-Gurion (Mapai)
- President of Israel – Yitzhak Ben-Zvi
- President of the Supreme Court – Yitzhak Olshan
- Chief of General Staff – Moshe Dayan
- Government of Israel – 5th Government of Israel until 29 June, 6th Government of Israel until 3 November, 7th Government of Israel

== Events ==
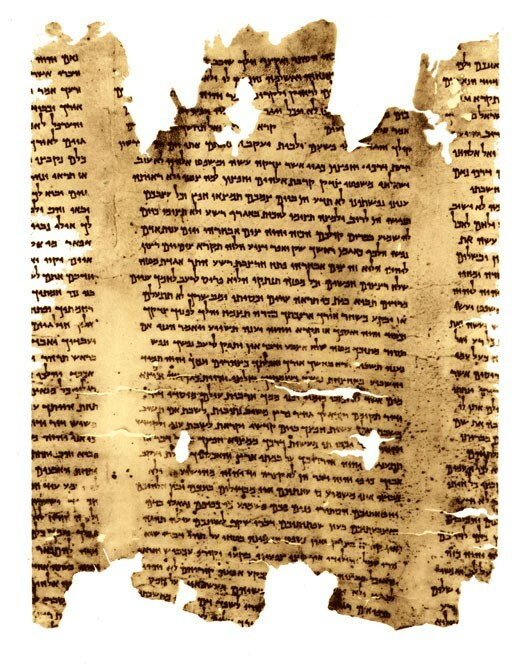
13 February: Israel obtains four of the seven Dead Sea Scrolls.

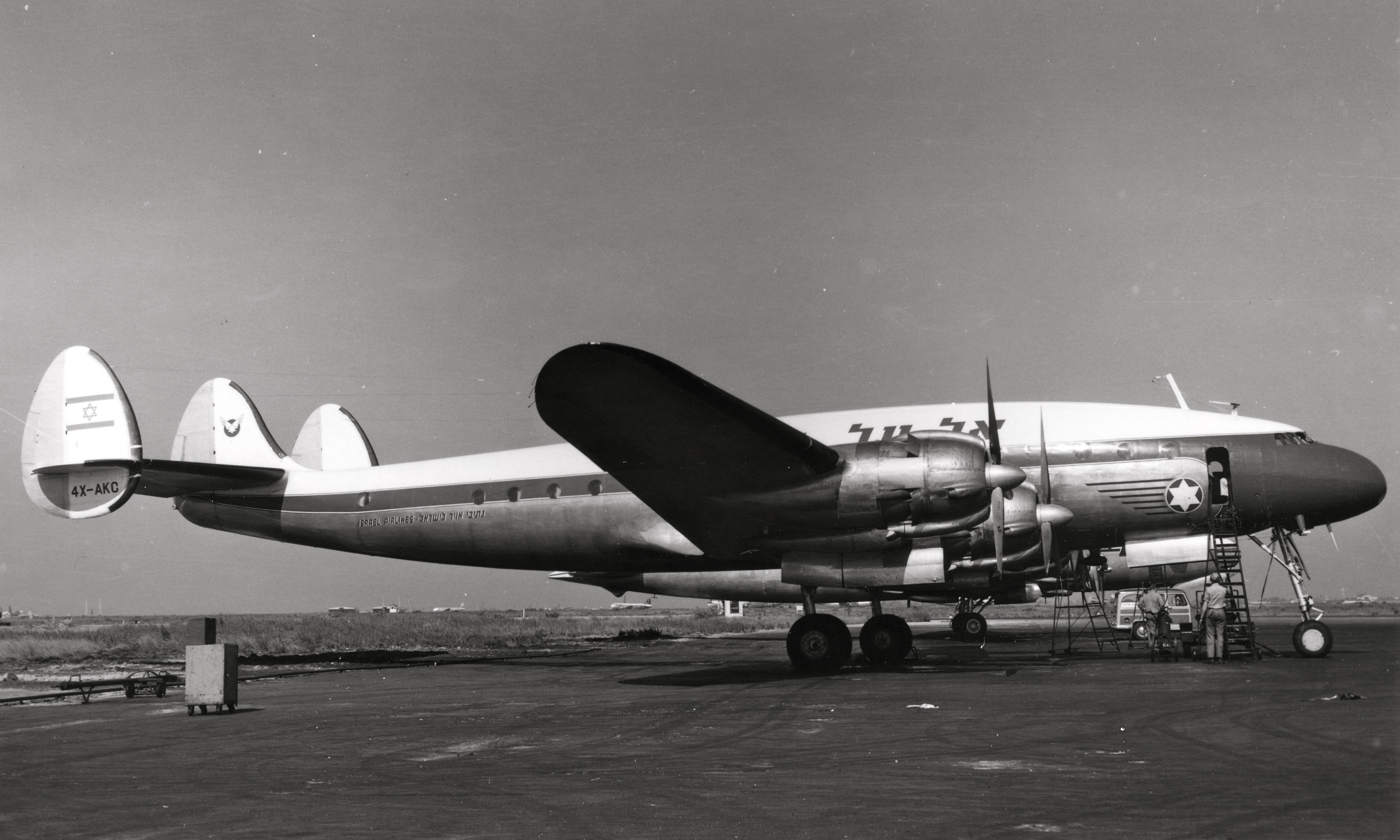
27 July: A Lockheed Constellation flying as El Al Flight 402 from London to Tel Aviv is shot down over Bulgaria

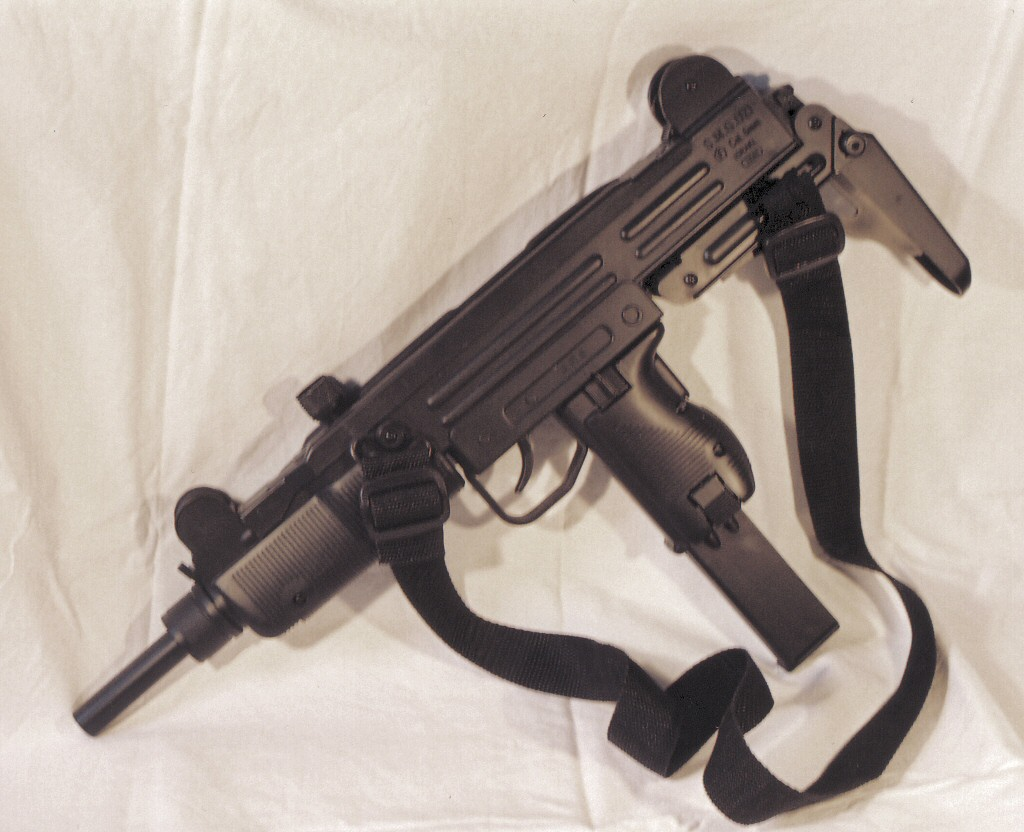
The IMI Uzi submachine gun is introduced in Israel

- 2 January – Armed Palestinian Arab militants attacked and killed two hikers in the Judean Desert.
- 18 January – Armed Palestinian Arab militants, who infiltrated into Israel from Jordan, kill Eliezer Katz and Hector Eidman, two Jewish immigrants from Argentina and Brazil who worked in moshav Agur.
- 31 January – Two Egyptian Jews, Moshe Marzouk and Shmuel Azar, are executed in Egypt, having been convicted of espionage and sabotage for Israel, in what becomes known as the "Lavon Affair". Two other Jews had died in custody awaiting trial. The executions spark widespread mourning across Israel.
- 2 February – Israeli defense minister Pinhas Lavon is forced to resign following the Lavon Affair.
- 12 February – Shoshana Har-Zion and Oded Wegmeister are murdered whilst on a trek on the Jordanian side of the Armistice Line. Three weeks later Shashana's brother, Meir, and three friends torture and kill five Bedouin.
- 13 February – Israel obtains four of the seven Dead Sea Scrolls, which had been discovered in the caves in and around the ruins of the ancient settlement of Khirbet Qumran on the northwest shore of the Dead Sea in the Judean Desert.
- 28 February – 1 March – Operation Black Arrow: An IDF operation carried out in Gaza (then under Egyptian control) from 28 February through 1 March 1955. The operation is aimed at the Egyptian army. 38 Egyptian and eight Israeli soldiers are killed during the operation and 30 Egyptians and thirteen Israelis are wounded. According to the Egyptian President Gamal Abdel Nasser, this operation was the main motivation for Egypt's major arms deal with Czechoslovakia in 1955.
- 25 March – Armed Palestinian Arab militants, who infiltrated into Israel from the Gaza Strip, throw hand grenades and open fire on a crowded wedding celebration in moshav Patish; one young Israeli woman is killed and 18 other guests are wounded.
- 19 April – The city of Ofakim is founded.
- 27 April – The IMI Uzi submachine gun is introduced in the IDF parade on the Israel's Independence Day.
- 27 July – After straying into Bulgarian airspace, El Al Flight 402 was shot down by two MiG-15 fighter jets, resulting in the deaths of all 58 on board.
- 29 August – Beit Hanan attack: a Palestinian Fedayeen squad carried out a shooting attack in Israel near the village Beit Hanan. Four Israeli civilians were killed in the attack and 10 additional people were injured.
- 31 August – Operation Elkayam: An IDF operation carried out against the police force in Khan Yunis, from where attacks had been launched against Israelis. 72 Egyptian soldiers are killed during the operation. The operation is followed by a massive buildup of Egyptian troops in the Gaza Strip.
- 1 September – Two Egyptian fighter jets penetrate Israeli airspace, and are shot down by the Israeli Air Force in a dogfight over Yad Mordechai.
- 11–12 September - Operation Jonathan: two Israeli paratroop companies attack Khirbet al Rahwa police fort, on the Hebron–Beersheba road, killing over twenty Jordanian soldiers and policemen. Famed Captain Meir Har-Zion is among the wounded Israelis.
- 19 September – The city of Dimona is founded.
- 27 October – 200 Paratroopers, commanded by Ariel Sharon, attack the Egyptian outpost at Kuntilla, on the southern Negev border, killing 12 Egyptian soldiers. Two Israelis are killed.
- 2 November – Operation Volcano: An IDF operation carried out against Egyptian military outposts at al Sabha and Wadi Siram along the Negev border following the invasion by Egyptian forces of the Israeli youth village and communal settlement Nitzana. 70 Egyptian and seven Israeli soldiers are killed and 48 Egyptian soldiers are captured during the operations.
- 11 December – Operation Olive leaves: An IDF Brigade attacked Syrian posts located on the eastern shore of the Sea of Galilee, in response to constant Syrian attacks on Israeli fishermen. 50 Syrian and six Israeli soldiers are killed and 30 Syrian soldiers are captured during the operation.
- 22 December – Operation Sa'ir: IDF forces raid Syrian outposts on the slopes of the Golan Heights.

=== Unknown dates ===
- The founding of the moshav Amatzia.

== Births ==
- 18 January – Hava Pinhas-Cohen writer and poet (died 2022)
- 18 February – Yaakov Alperon, Israeli organized crime mobster (died 2008).
- 4 May – Avram Grant, Israeli football manager.
- 19 January – Avraham Burg, former member of the Knesset, chairman of the Jewish Agency for Israel and Speaker of the Knesset.
- 16 July – Zohar Argov, Israeli singer (died 1987).
- 4 September – David Broza, Israeli singer, musician and composer.

== Deaths ==
- 13 January – Uri Ilan (born 1935), Israeli soldier captured by the Syrian Army who posthumously became a national hero, committed suicide in captivity.

== See also ==
- 1955 in Israeli film
