= 1954 in Israel =

- Decades: 1930s; 1940s; 1950s; 1960s; 1970s
- See also: History of Israel; Timeline of Israel history; List of years in Israel

Events in the year 1954 in Israel.

== Incumbents ==
- Prime Minister of Israel – David Ben-Gurion (Mapai) until 26 January, Moshe Sharett (Mapai)
- President of Israel – Yitzhak Ben-Zvi
- President of the Supreme Court – Moshe Smoira; Yitzhak Olshan
- Chief of General Staff - Moshe Dayan
- Government of Israel - 4th Government of Israel until 26 January, 5th Government of Israel

== Events ==
The Tel Aviv Savidor Central Railway Station opens on 3 November.

- 1 January – The Kastner trial starts.
- 26 January – Moshe Sharett presents his cabinet for a Knesset "Vote of Confidence". The 5th Government is approved that day and the members were sworn in.
- 1 July – Jordanian soldiers stationed at the walls of the old city of Jerusalem begin to snipe residents of the city. A 24-year-old Israeli woman is killed from the shootings near the Jaffa Gate.
- 29 July – The Ma'agan disaster: a Piper J-3 light aircraft falls into the crowd of people who are attending a memorial ceremony for the Kibbutz's fallen Parachutists at the village Ma'agan; 17 people are killed and 25 people are wounded.
- 28 September – The Israeli government's attempt for the Israeli ship "Bat Galim" to traverse the Suez Canal fails after the ship is arrested by the Egyptian authorities. This attempt is made after Egypt prevented other Israeli ships and foreign cargo ships headed towards Israeli ports, of passing through the Suez Canal, in violation with the terms of the Convention of Constantinople.
- 3 November – The Tel Aviv Savidor Central Railway Station opens.
- 8 December – Five Israeli soldiers (including Uri Ilan) are captured by Syrian soldiers near a Syrian post in the Golan Heights
- 11 December – A trial of 11 Jews begins in Cairo in what became known as the Lavon affair
- 12 December the IAF intercept a Syrian civilian plane and force it to land at Lod Airport where the passengers were held for two days.

=== Israeli–Palestinian conflict ===
The most prominent events related to the Israeli–Palestinian conflict which occurred during 1954 include:

Notable Palestinian militant operations against Israeli militancy targets

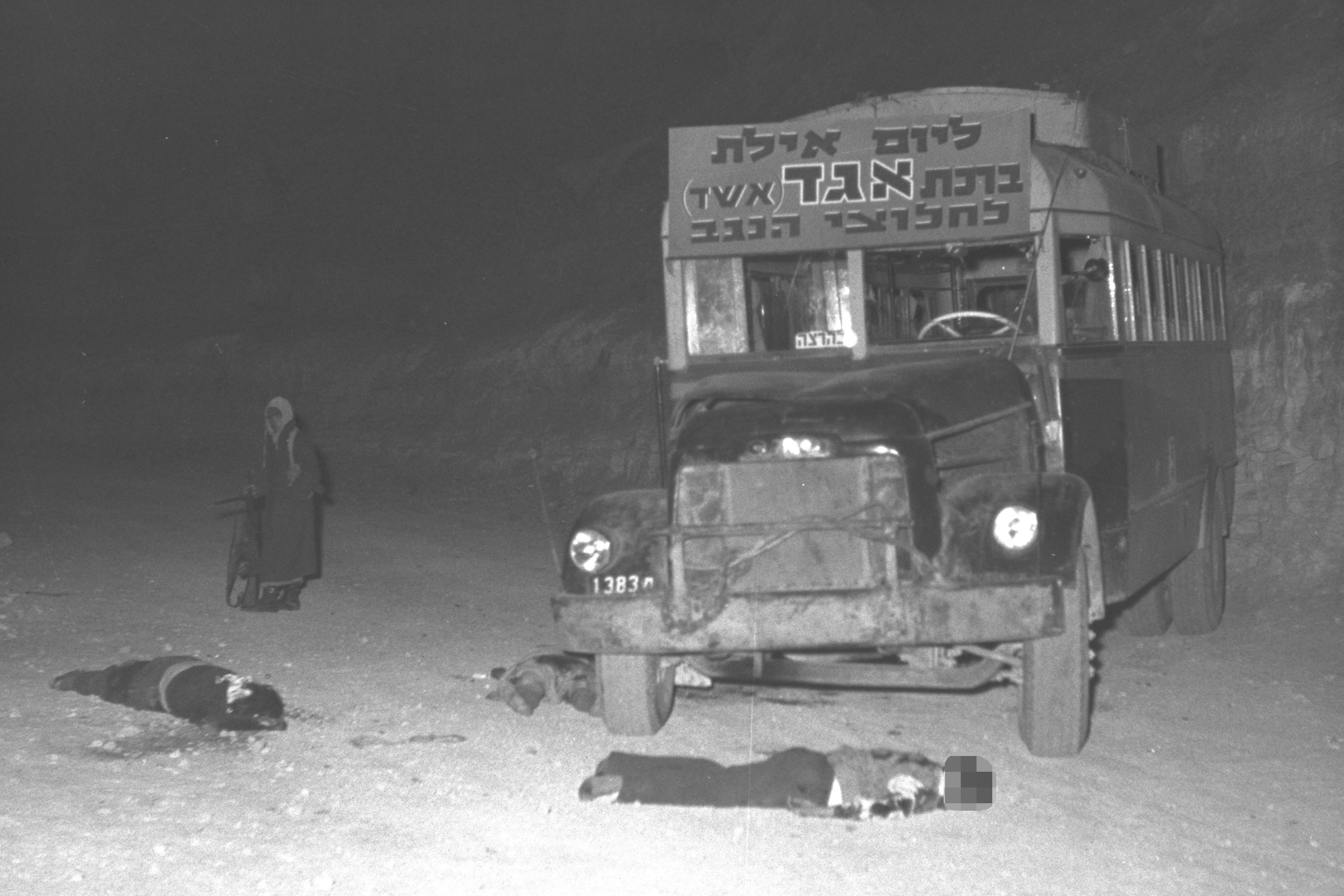
Ma'ale Akrabim massacre: The bus was attacked and three victims of the massacre. The photo was taken several hours after the incident

The most prominent Palestinian fedayeen terror attacks committed against Israelis during 1954 include:

- 17 March – Ma'ale Akrabim massacre: Armed Palestinian Arab militants ambush and board an Israeli civilian passenger bus traveling from Eilat to Tel Aviv. Eleven Israelis on the bus are killed by the militants. Four passengers survived, two of whom are wounded by the militants.
- 27 June – Armed Palestinian Arab militants, who infiltrated to Israel from Jordan, kill an elderly Israeli farmer on the outskirts of Ra'anana.

Notable Israeli military operations against Palestinian militancy targets

The most prominent Israeli military counter-terrorism operations (military campaigns and military operations) carried out against Palestinian militants during 1954 include:

- 28 March – 60 members of 890th Paratroop Battalion, under command of Ariel Sharon, attack Nahhalin killing 4 national Guardsmen, 3 Arab Legionnaires, the village mukhtar and a woman.
- 27 June – A seven-man raiding party, including Meir Har-Zion, attack an Arab Legion camp at 'Azzun killing three Jordanian soldiers in their beds. A shepherd was also killed as they approached the camp. One of the attackers was wounded and taken prisoner.
- 1 September – 890th Paratroop Battalion attack Beit Liqya killing three Arab Legionnaires and taking three prisoner. Two paratroopers are killed in the attack.

=== Unknown dates ===
- The founding of the kibbutz Bahan.
- The founding of the city Kiryat Gat.

== Notable births ==
- 25 January – David Grossman, Israeli author.
- 17 February – Miki Berkovich, former Israeli basketball player.
- 25 February – Gabi Ashkenazi, 19th Chief of General Staff of the Israel Defense Forces
- 26 February – Yuli Tamir, Israeli academic and former politician.
- 20 June – Ilan Ramon, Israeli Air Force pilot, Israel's first astronaut (died 2003)
- 16 September – Rifaat Turk, Arab-Israeli former football player and manager.
- 30 December – Pnina Rosenblum, Israeli businesswoman, model and media personality.

== Notable deaths ==
- 18 May – Selig Brodetsky, Russian-born Israeli mathematician, politician and president of the Hebrew University of Jerusalem (born 1888)
- 17 November – Yitzhak Lamdan, Russian (Ukraine)-born Israeli poet and columnist (born 1899)

== See also ==
- 1954 in Israeli music
- 1954 in Israeli sport
