= 1950 in Israel =

- Decades: 1930s; 1940s; 1950s; 1960s; 1970s
- See also: History of Israel; Timeline of Israeli history; List of years in Israel

Events in the year 1950 in Israel.

== Incumbents ==
- Prime Minister of Israel – David Ben-Gurion (Mapai)
- President of Israel – Chaim Weizmann
- President of the Supreme Court – Moshe Smoira
- Chief of General Staff – Yigal Yadin
- Government of Israel – 1st Government of Israel until 30 October, 2nd Government of Israel

== Events ==
=== January ===
- Food and fuel shortages and the Tzena (Austerity program) leads to a growing black market.
- 23 January – The Knesset passes a resolution confirming Jerusalem as Israel's capital, proclaiming that "Jerusalem is, and has always been, the capital of Israel".

=== February ===
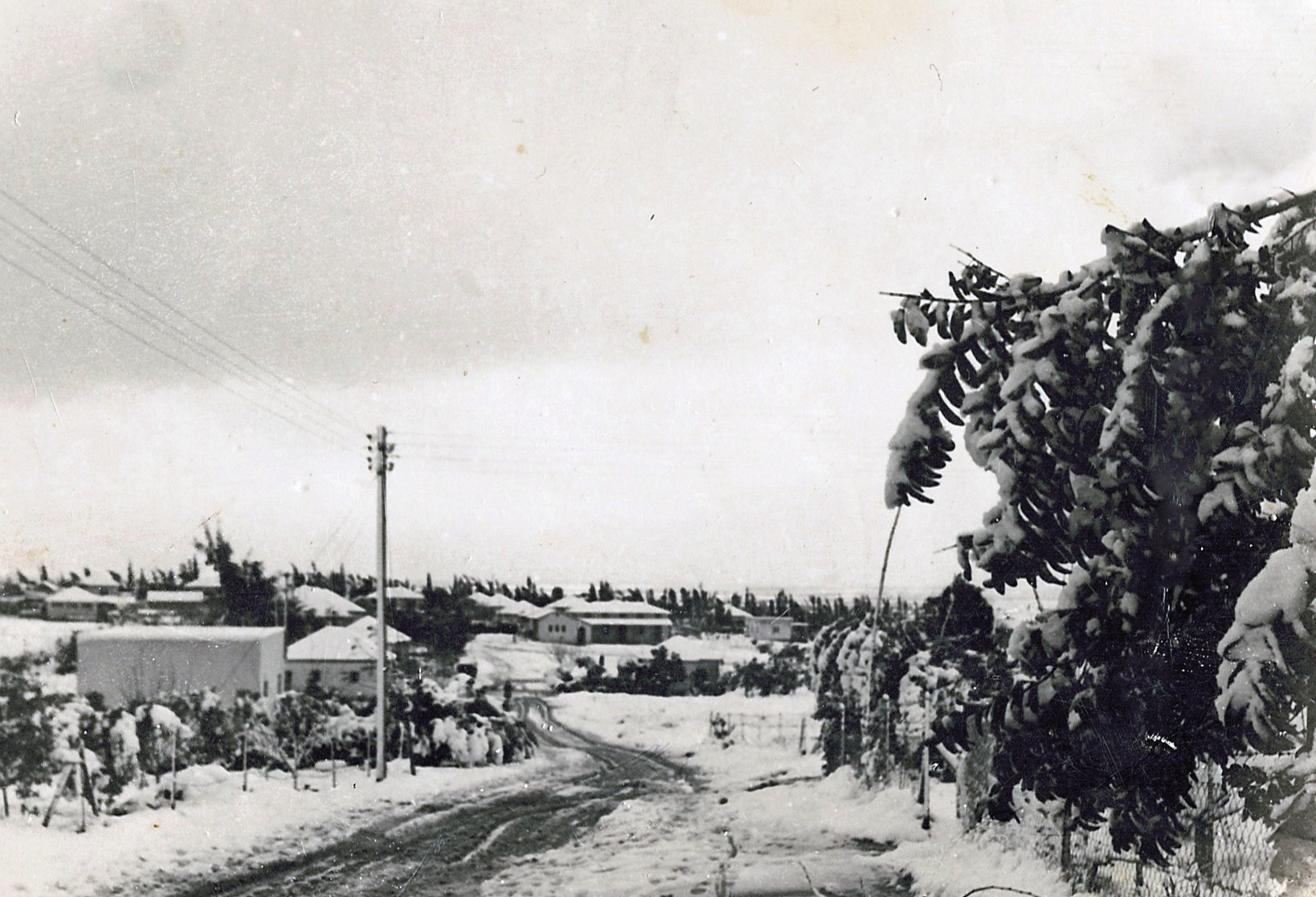
5-6 February: Snow blankets most of the country

- 5–6 February - Snow falls for two days throughout the country, in a rare meteorological phenomenon for the coastal plain and the Negev desert.
- 11 February – Britain releases Israeli assets worth £15 million that have been frozen since the end of the Mandate in 1948.
- 17 February – King Abdullah I of Jordan and Mossad Director Reuven Shiloah of Israel met at the king's winter palace at El Shuneh, where the king presented a seven-point treaty proposal.
- 22 February – Egypt and Israel signed a General Armistice Agreement at Auja al-Hafir, a town on the border between the two nations; the Agreement defines the boundaries of the Gaza Strip as a neutral zone between the two countries.
- 24 February – Representatives of Israel and Jordan initial a five-year peace treaty that provided for joint control of Jerusalem and commerce between the two nations, but the pact is not approved by either side.
- 24–25 February – The Egyptian army takes over the islands of Tiran and Sanafir at the entrance to the Gulf of Aqaba.
- 28 February – An airport is opened at Eilat.

=== March ===
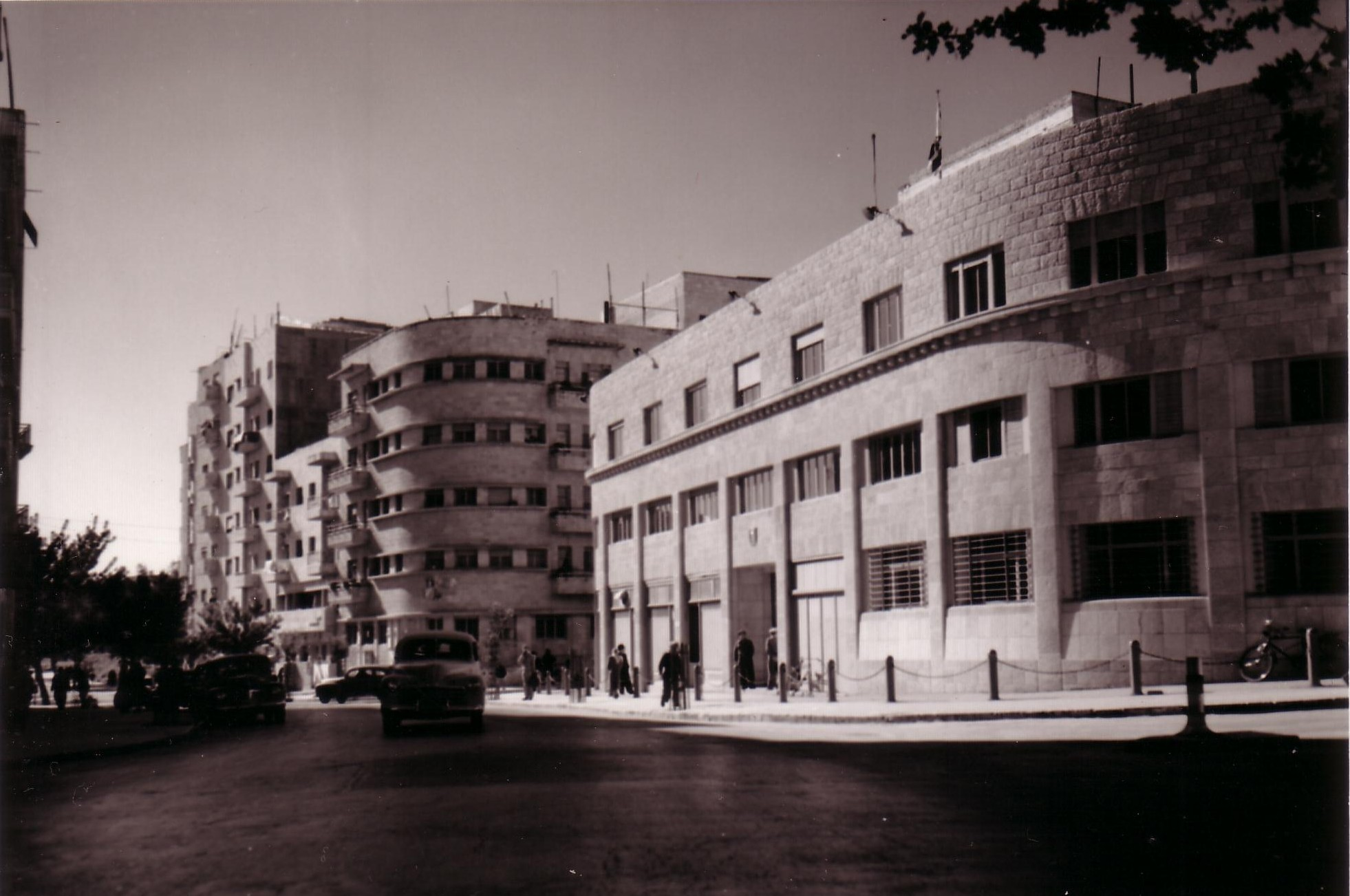
13 March: Frumin House in Jerusalem becomes the temporary, but long-term, home of the Knesset (Parliament of Israel).

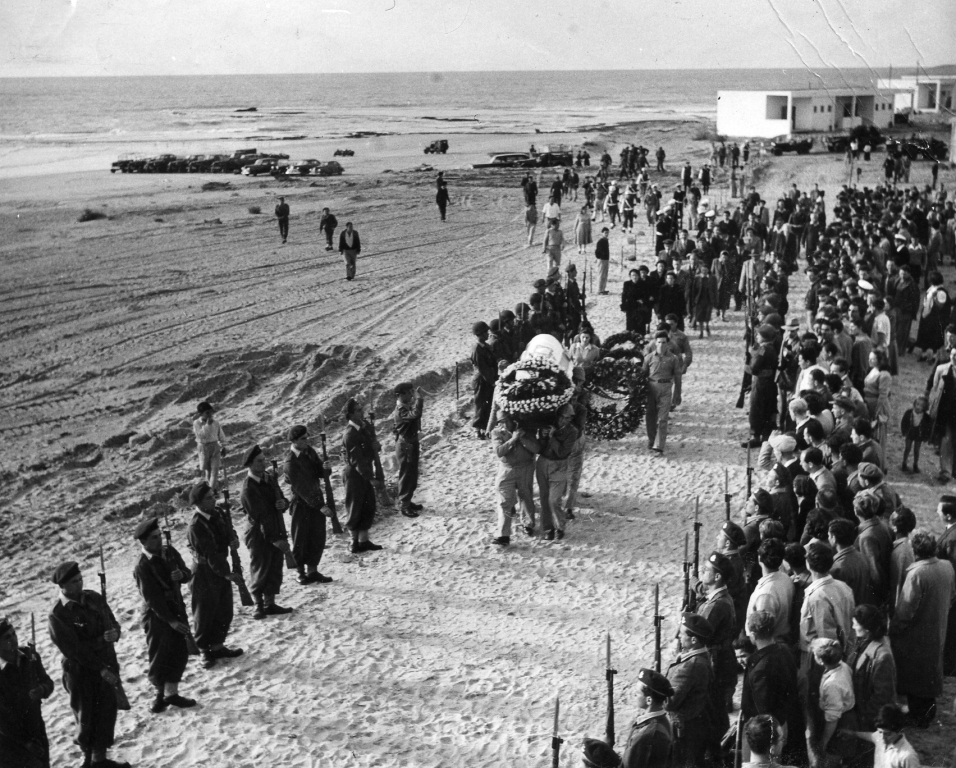
26: March: A funeral procession for arrival of the casket of Hannah Senesh at Kibbutz Sedot Yam.

- Mapai (Israel Labor Party) fails to persuade Mapam (United Worked Party) to join the coalition.
- The United Religious Front threatens to leave the coalition if religious teachers and youth counselors are not provided in the immigrant camps.
- 6 March – Iran extends diplomatic recognition to Israel.
- 11 March – The radio station Kol Zion Lagolah (The Voice of Zion to the Diaspora) begins broadcasting in English, French and Yiddish.
- 13 March – The Knesset resumes holding its sessions in Jerusalem, in Frumin House on King George Street until a permanent location is built for it.
- 14 March – The Knesset passes the "Absentees' Property Law" providing for the confiscation of property owned by any of the 725,000 Arab-Palestinian residents who had fled from Israel.
- 17 March – An Israeli shepherd is killed and his flock stolen by Palestinian fedayeen.
- 26 March – The remains of the Hannah Szenes, a Jewish paratrooper who had fought in the British Army during World War II and was captured, tortured and executed in Hungary, are brought to Israel and buried in the cemetery on Mount Herzl, Jerusalem.
- 28 March – Bodies of three children from 'Abasan, killed by members of Battalion 22 on 16 March, are found in Israel.
- 31 March – Three Israeli soldiers and two Israeli civilians killed in a Negev ambush.

=== April ===
- The number of new immigrants in temporary camps reaches 100,000, generating wide press coverage about their housing and employment difficulties.
- 4 April – The United Nations Trusteeship Council formally approved the Statute for the City of Jerusalem, declaring that Jerusalem should be considered international territory and a demilitarized zone.
- 16 April – An apartment building in Jaffa collapses, killing ten and injuring dozens more.
- 24 April – Hashemite Kingdom of Jordan annexes the territory west of the Jordan River that it had occupied following the 1948 Arab-Israeli War.
- 27 April – The United Kingdom formally recognizes Israel de jure, following the de facto recognition since 29 January 1949; and in parallel, recognizes Jordan's annexation of the West Bank.

=== May ===
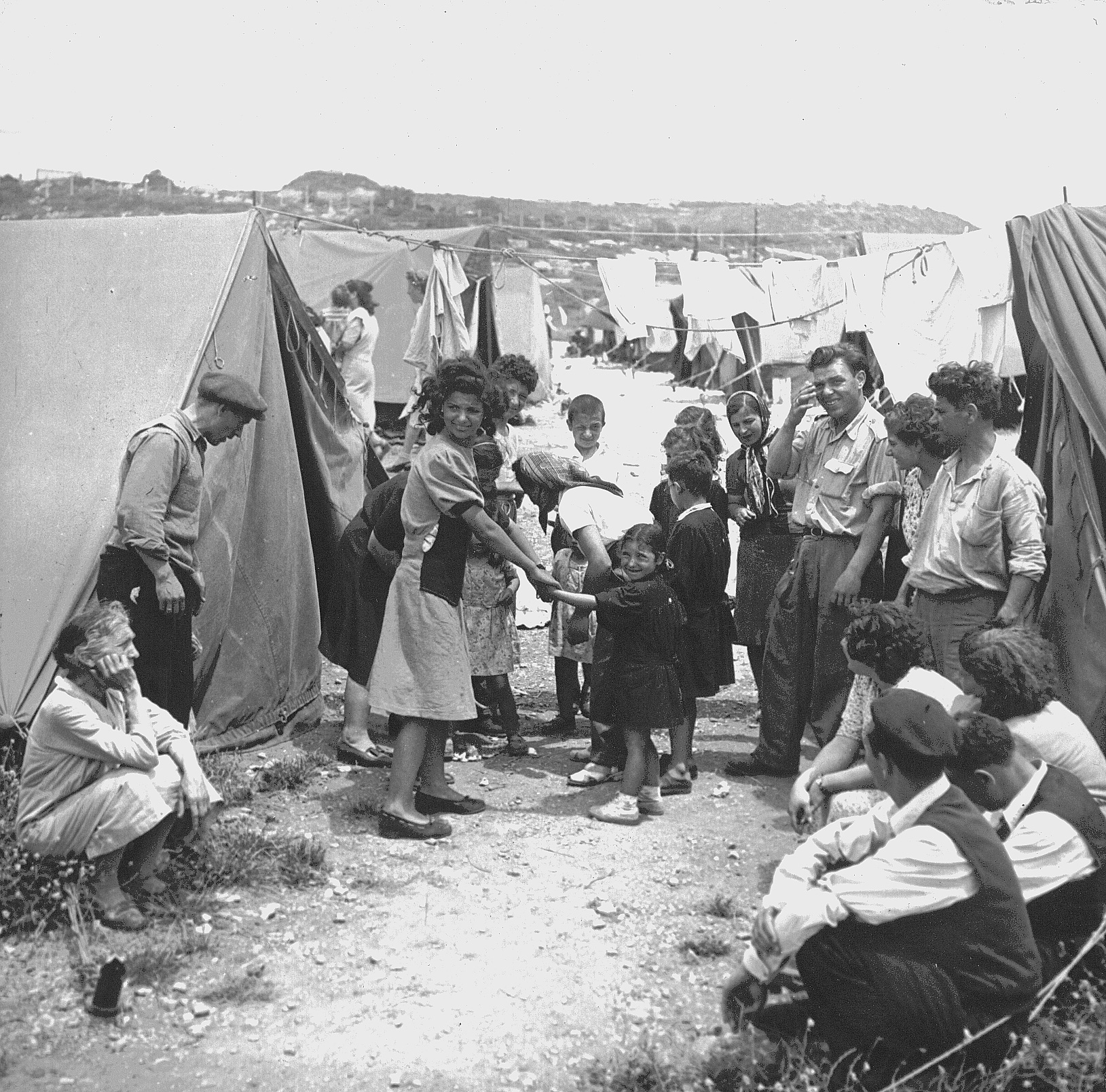
May: One of the 62 ma'abarot (immigrant transit camps) established in 1950 to temporarily house the massive influx of Jewish refugees and new immigrants.

- The government and the Jewish Agency decide to establish ma'abarot (immigrant transit camps) to house the growing number of new immigrants in the country.
- 1 May – The May Day parade in Tel Aviv is cancelled because of a dispute between the Mapai and Mapam over the slogans, in a sign of the growing political division between the two socialist parties.
- 17 May – A Royal Air Force Short Sunderland is confronted by Israeli Air Force Spitfires and is forced to land at Lod Airport after it inadvertently crosses into Israeli airspace and overflies Ramat David Airbase. The Sunderland's crew had been issued maps that did not depict Israel, as Britain had only recently recognized the country.
- 18 May – An airlift to bring the Jews of Iraq to Israel, Operation Ezra and Nehemiah, begins, while large-scale immigration of Jewish refugees from Eastern Europe and North Africa continues.
- 25 May – The governments of the United States, Britain and France issue a tripartite declaration guaranteeing the territorial status quo determined by the 1949 Armistice Agreements.

=== June ===
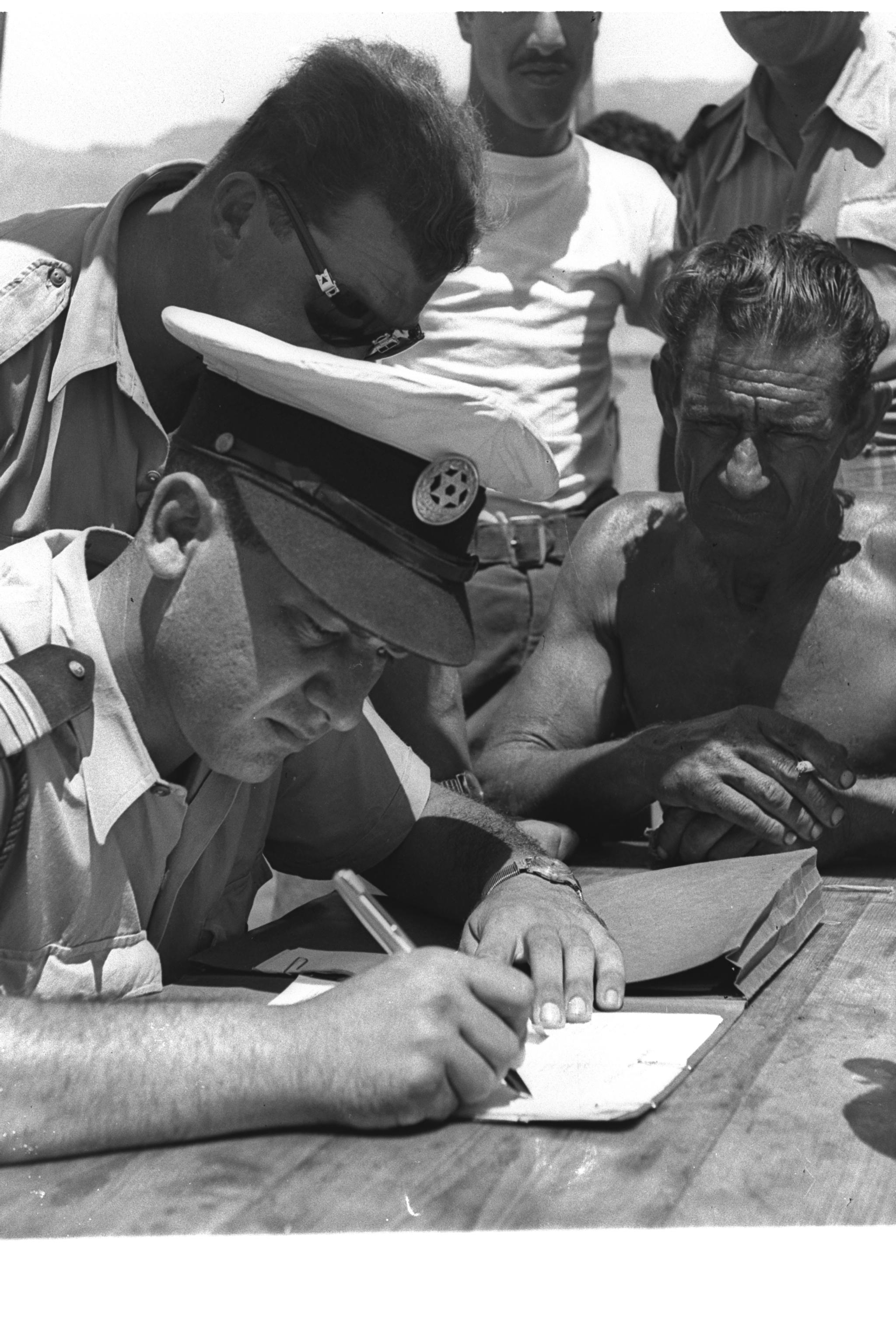
26 June: Customs officer completes the clearance for the "Luce", the first ship to arrive at the port of Eilat.

- 13 June – The Harari Decision, a landmark in Israeli constitutional law, initiated by Yizhar Harari of the Progressive Party is approved by the Knesset. The Decision stated that the First Knesset would postpone the work on creating a full Israeli constitution immediately, and instead the constitution be written in chapters, called "Basic Laws", and when all had been written they would be compiled into a complete constitution.
- 21 June – The port of Eilat on the Red Sea is inaugurated with the arrival a ship from Aden containing Torah scrolls and religious articles transferred from the Jewish community of Yemen to Israel.
- 29 June – The Knesset approves the state budget of I£60 million (US$168 million) for 1950–51, representing an increase of 30% over the previous budget, after numerous delays,

=== July ===
- 5 July – The Knesset passes the Law of Return, which gives Jews, those of Jewish ancestry, and their spouses the right to migrate to and settle in Israel and obtain citizenship.
- 31 July – The austerity program is broadened to include rationing of clothing and shoes.

=== August ===
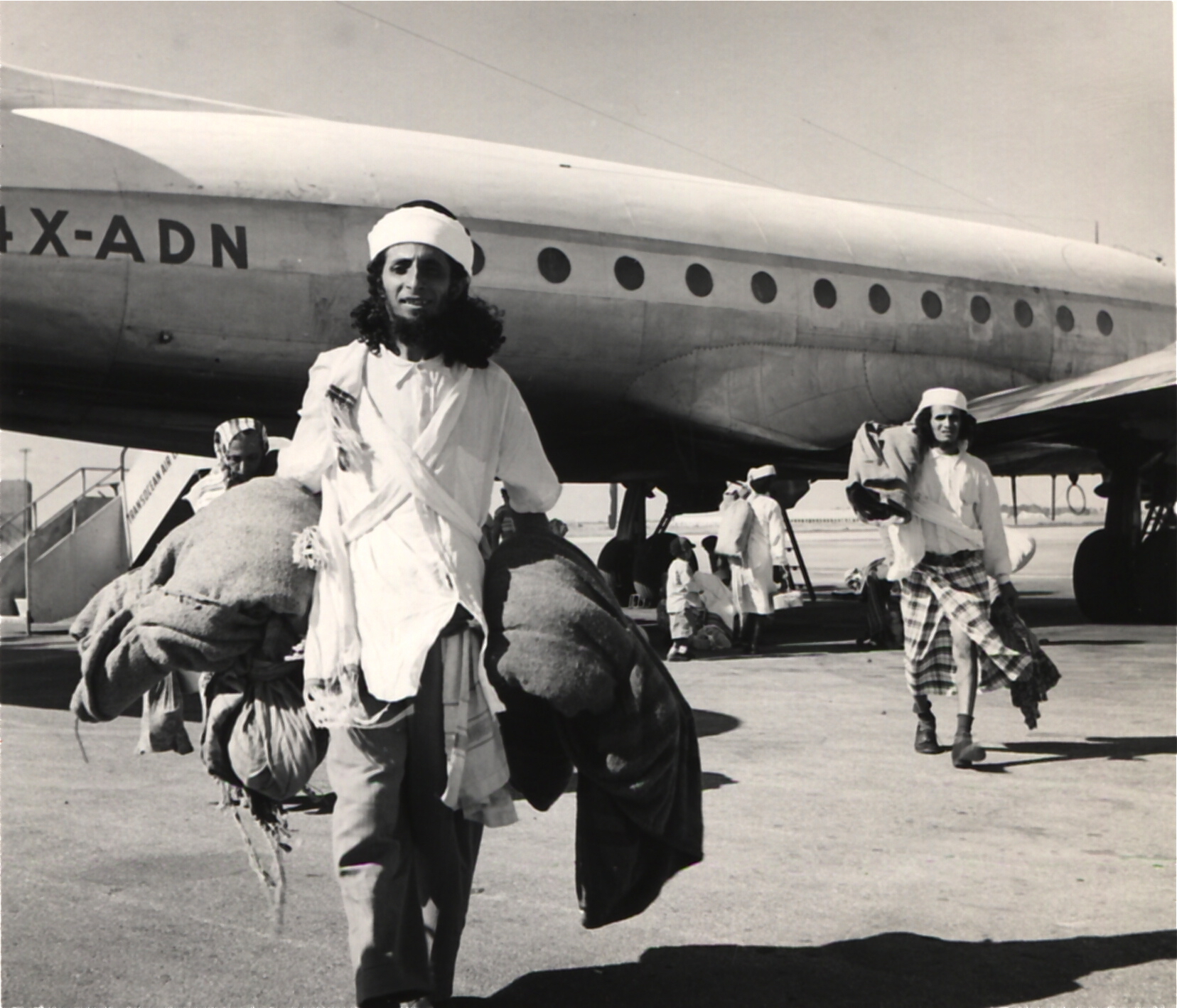
26 August: Jews arriving from Aden and Yemen on Operation Magic Carpet, which ends in September.

- 1 August – The Knesset passes the "Law for Administering of Justice to the Nazis and their Collaborators" and provides for capital punishment as the maximum sentence for perpetrators of the Holocaust.
- 1 August–14 August – In protest against the rationing policy of the Austerity program, shopkeepers begin a two-week strike.
- 7 August – The retailers strike becomes a general strike protesting the Austerity program.
- 8 August – A no-confidence motion initiated by the opposition on the government's implementation of the rationing and austerity policy is defeated in the Knesset by a vote of 57 to 36.
- 23 August – An Israeli woman is killed and her boyfriend wounded by fedayeen gunfire in a Yarkona orange grove.

=== September ===
27 September: A scene from the opening ceremony of the 3rd Maccabiah Games in Tel Aviv.

- 3 September – An international conference of Jewish business leaders, called "the Billion's Conference", is held in Jerusalem to help Israel by raising capital.
- 6 September – The first State of Israel bond issue is initiated in the United States to assist Israel to raise capital to develop its economic infrastructure and absorb the masses of new immigrants.
- 24 September – Galei Zahal, the Israel Army Radio station, begins broadcasting
- 24 September – The airlift of some 50,000 Jews from Yemen and Aden to Israel, called Operation Magic Carpet, is completed.
- 27 September – The 3rd Maccabiah Games open for the first time after the independence of the State of Israel and fifteen years after the previous games, and close on 8 October.
- 30 September – The government announces a new economic growth program that includes measures to facilitate imports, promote exports, reduce inflation and promote the issuing of domestic loans.

=== October ===
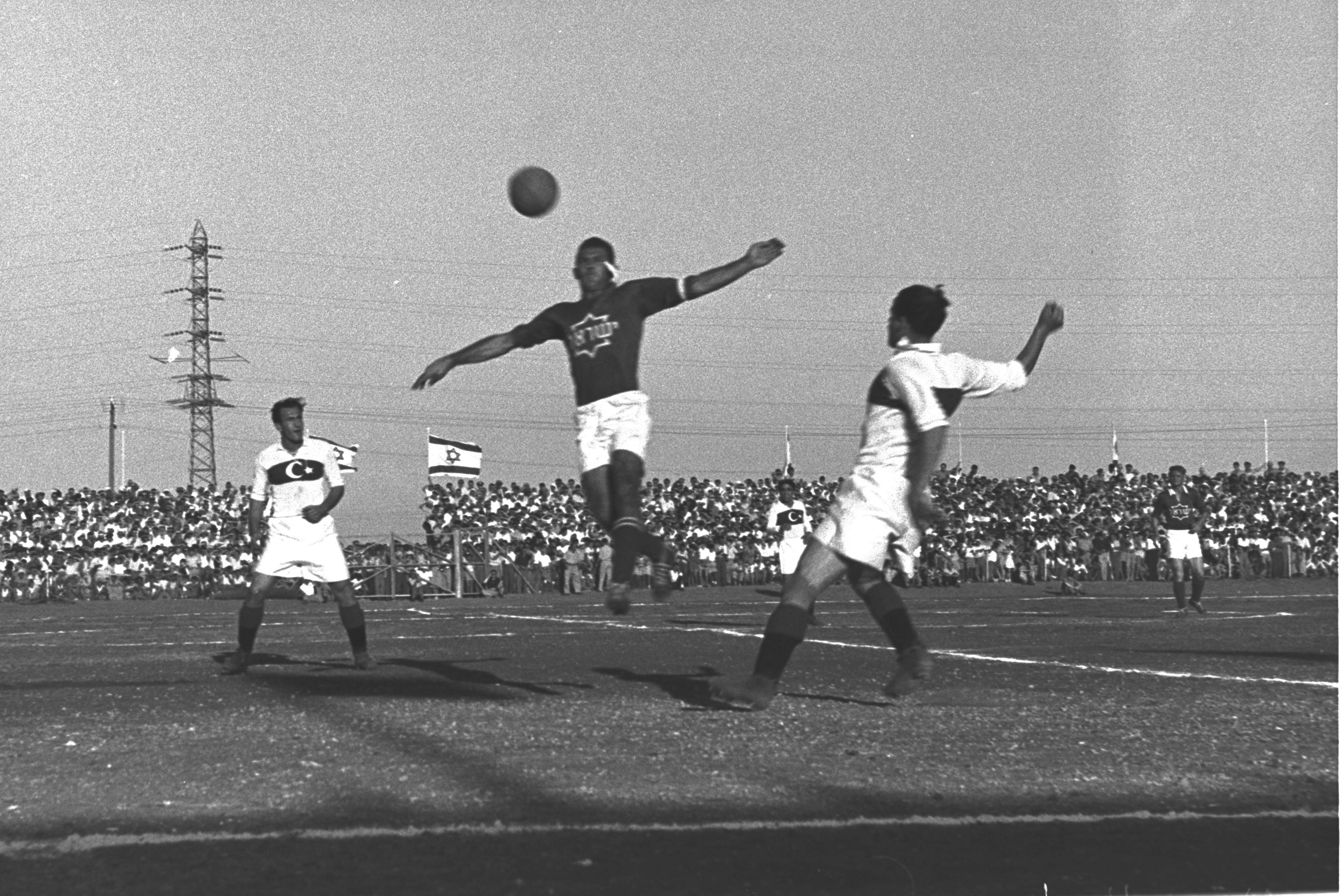
28 October: Soccer match between Israel and Turkey, Ramat Gan Stadium.

- 3 October – Prime Minister Ben Gurion takes charge of an anti-black market campaign and personally appeals to the public to end black market purchasing.
- 15 October – Prime Minister Ben-Gurion submits his resignation and that of the government, to President Weizmann, following a coalition crisis over Ben-Gurion's intention to dismantle the Ministry of Supply and Rationing and to appoint a businessperson Minister of Commerce and Industry; the President asks Ben Gurion to form a new government.
- 17 October – Ben-Gurion forms a minority government of seven ministers from his party, Mapai and one minister from the Sephardi party; the proposed government fails to win approval in the Knesset.
- 19 October – President Weizmann asks Pinhas Rosen of the Progressive Party to form a government.
- 28 October – The Israeli soccer team wins a sensational but friendly match against Turkey, 5–1.
- 29 October – Pinhas Rosen informs President Weizmann that he does not have the support needed to form a new government.

=== November ===
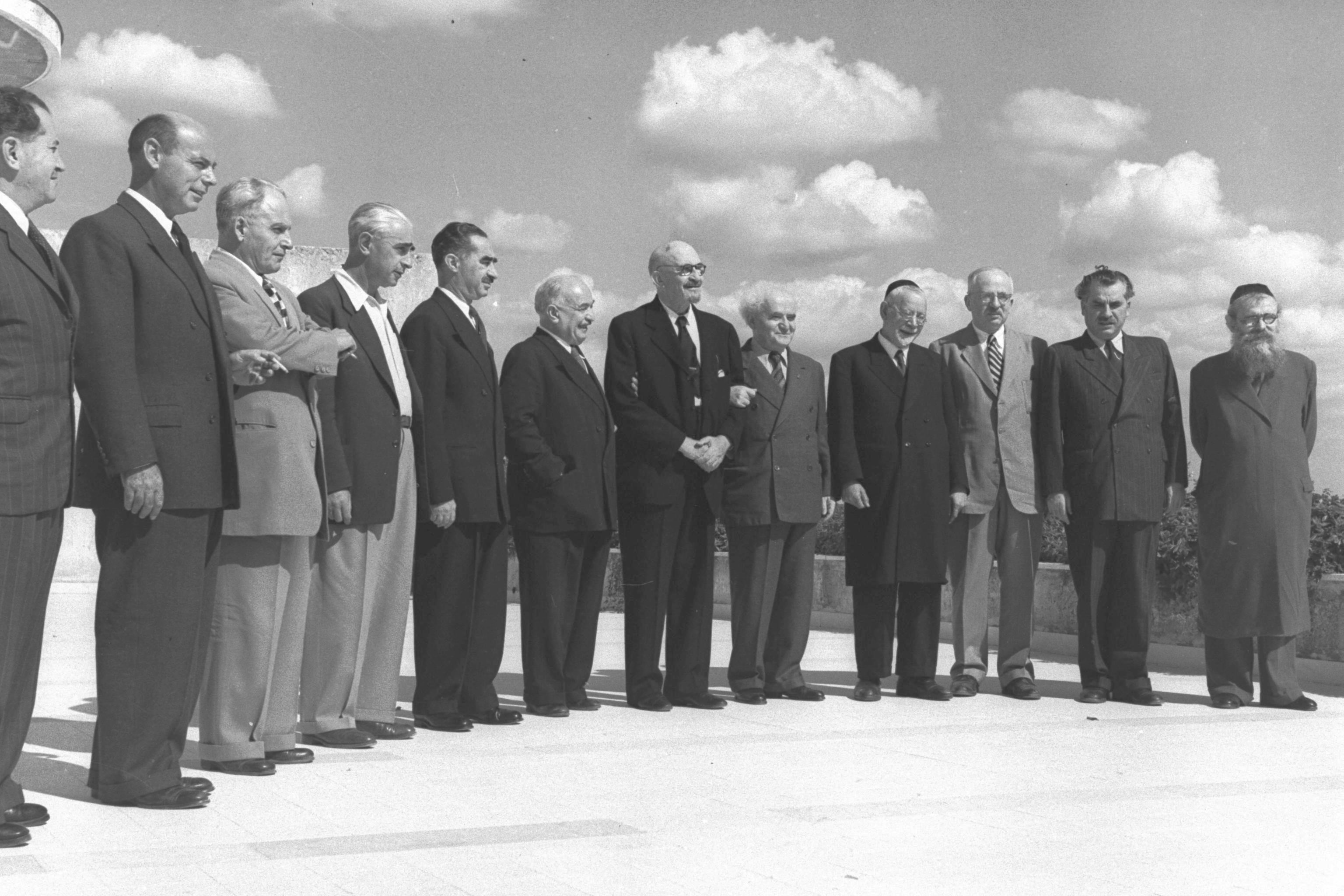
5 November: The members of the Second government of Israel at the house of President Weizmann in Rehovot.

- 1 November – David Ben-Gurion forms a new government and presents his cabinet for a Knesset; the Second government of Israel is approved that day by a vote of 69 to 42, with 2 abstentions, and sworn in.
- 6 November – An appeal to the Israeli people to house new immigrant children for the winter months, called the Shelter campaign, is launched.
- 14 November – The first Municipal elections in Israel result in large decrease for Ben-Gurion's Mapai party and a gain for the General Zionists, a center-right Zionist party, who obtain a quarter of the votes, only slightly less than Mapai.
- 29 November – Jordanian armed forces block the road to Eilat at kilometer 78, claiming that it passes through their territory.
- 29 November – The issue of education in the ma'abarot (immigrant transit camps) develops into a new dispute between Mapai and the religious parties.

=== December ===
- 2 December – Israeli forces clear the Jordanians from the kilometer 78-point and reopen the road to Eilat; in the following weeks, the Jordanians will reject talks at the Armistice committee until the passage to Eilat is settled to their satisfaction.
- 31 December – Some 170,000 new immigrants have arrived in Israel during 1950, and 62 ma'abarot housing 93,000 have been set up; another 40,000 are housed in other temporary camps.

== Unspecified dates ==
The following events took place during 1950 (dates not specified):

- The founding of the moshav Ahihud
- The founding of moshav Ahuzam
- The founding of moshav Avigdor
- The founding of moshav Beit Ezra
- The founding of the city Beit Shemesh
- The founding of moshav Ben Zakai
- The founding of moshav Berekhya
- The founding of moshav Bitha
- The founding of kibbutz Ein HaShlosha
- The founding of moshav Even Sapir
- The founding of moshav Gan Sorek
- The founding of moshav Gimzo
- The founding of the community settlement Kfar Hasidim Bet
- The founding of moshav Kfar Shmuel
- The founding of the city Kiryat Malakhi
- The founding of the city Kiryat Shmona
- The founding of moshav Mivtahim
- The founding of moshav Naham
- The founding of moshav Netiv HaShayara
- The founding of kibbutz Nir Eliyahu
- The founding of moshav Ora
- The founding of moshav Patish
- The founding of moshav Peduim
- The founding of moshav Ranen
- The founding of moshav Shuva
- The founding of moshav Tlamim
- The founding of moshav Yakhini
- The founding of moshav Yashresh
- The founding of moshav Yatzitz
- The founding of moshav Yish'i
- The founding of moshav Zeitan

== Births ==
- 31 March – Yitzhak Klepter, rock musician and songwriter (died 2022)
- 17 May – Galia Yishai, actress and singer (died 2020)
- 25 June – Dudu Geva, cartoonist (died 2005).
- 25 June – Nitza Saul, actress.
- 4 August – Gidi Gov, singer, actor, entertainer and TV host.
- 20 September – Moshe Mizrahi, senior Israel Police official and member of Knesset (died 2022)
- 11 October – Amos Gitai, film director.
- 25 December – Yehuda Poliker, singer, songwriter, musician and painter.

== Deaths ==
- 17 March – Gedaliah Alon (born 1901) Russian (Polish)-born Israeli historian.
- 29 May – Avraham Ben-Yitzhak (born 1883), Austro-Hungarian (Galicia)-born Israeli poet.
- 18 September – Fania Bergstein (born 1908), Russian (Polish)-born Israeli author and poet.
- 7 December – Shlomo Kaplansky (born 1884), Russian (Polish)-born Labour Zionist politician and the director of the Technion – Israel Institute of Technology in Haifa.

== See also ==
- 1950 in Israeli film
- List of attacks against Israeli civilians before 1967
