= List of Israeli films of 1950 =

A list of films produced by the Israeli film industry in 1950.

== 1950 releases ==
Premiere	Title	Director	Cast	Genre	Notes	Ref
?	Miklalah L'Brahah (Hebrew: מקללה לברכה, lit. "Blessed curse")	Joseph Krumgold		Drama		
?	Dream No More	Joseph Krumgold		Drama		
?	Ba Hayom	Shmuel Schweig		Documentary	Written by Michael Elkins	
?	Ha-Fuga (Hebrew: הפוגה, lit. "Intermission")	Amram Amar		Drama		

== See also ==
- 1950 in Israel
