= List of Israeli films of 1949 =

A list of films produced by the Israeli film industry in 1949.

== 1949 releases ==
Premiere	Title	Director	Cast	Genre	Notes	Res
?	Ein Breira (Hebrew: אין ברירה, lit. "No choice")	Joseph Lejtes		Drama		

== See also ==
- 1949 in Israel
