= List of Israeli films of 1955 =

A list of films produced by the Israeli film industry in 1955.

== 1955 releases ==
Premiere	Title	Director	Cast	Genre	Notes	Ref
?	Giv'a 24 Einaa Ona (Hebrew: גבעה 24 אינה עונה, lit. "Hill 24 Doesn't Answer")	Thorold Dickinson		Adventure, Drama, Romance, War	Entered into the 1955 Cannes Film Festival	

== See also ==
- 1955 in Israel
