= Shuka Glotman =

Shuka –Yehoshua (Joshua) Glotman (Hebrew: שוקה-יהושע גלוטמן; born 1953, in Israel) is a mixed-media artist including photography, experimental filmmaking, installation and text. Currently he is lecturing in the Tel-Aviv University and in the Beer-Sheba University. He is a curator and a group facilitator specializing in facilitating discussion between Israelis and Palestinians. Glotman lives in a small village in the Upper Western Galilee.

== Biography ==
Glotman grew up in Tel-Aviv. At the age of nine he started to take pictures. During 1975-6 he studied photography in Hadassah College Jerusalem and lived in London from 1977 to 1982 where he studied at the Polytechnic of Central London (now University of Westminster, London) and had his first shows there. Since 1982, back in Israel, he became involved as an artist in community art and art education. His first show in Israel went on in 1984. Since, his works have been exhibited in shows in Israel and abroad. In 1998 his video installation A Blow has been exhibited at the 24th Bienale de São Paulo, Brazil. In 2000 he had one-man show Here Live Happily Mr. Poetic & Mr. Pathetic in the TLV Museum of Art. He has curated most of David Perlov's photo-exhibitions during his life and has published articles about his work. Since 1992 he has been an active partner in Multi-Exposure, an exchange scheme for young artists from Palestine-Israel-Britain.

== Publications ==
This is a selection of some of Shuka Glotman's published works:

- An Israeli's Album (Camera Obscura, TLV, 1988)
- Shuka Glotman (a catalogue for Here Live Happily Mr. Poetic & Mr. Pathetic, TLV Museum of Art, 2000)
- David Perlov: Color Photographs 2000-2003 (editor & writer, The Israeli Museum of Photography, Tel-Chai, 2003)
- Shuka Glotman: Photography Alive, 2006, Meir-Publishing House, Abirim, Israel 1380600, ISBN 978-965-91008-1-1
- Shuka Glotman :The Photographic Language at School. 1996, the University Publishers, Tel Aviv. ISBN 965-372-028-7
- Shuka Glotman: Between Treetops and Clouds. 2015, Meir-Publishing House, Abirim, Israel. 1380600, ISBN 978-965-91008-2-8
- Shuka Glotman: An Israeli's Album (revised edition). 2015, Meir-Publishing House, Abirim, Israel. 1380600, ISBN 978-965-91008-3-5

== Awards ==
- The Ministry of Culture Prize for Art for 2006
- The Klachkin Prize for 2000, America-Israel Cultural Foundation.
- Winner of the Porizki Prize for Photography, 1996, Tel Aviv Museum of Art.
- Winner of the Arts & Science Ministry Prize for 1995.
- The Enrique Kavilin Photography Prize for 1994, Israel Museum.
