= Timeline of Israeli history =

- Decades: 2000s; 2010s; 2020s
- See also: History of Israel; Timeline of Israeli history; List of years in Israel

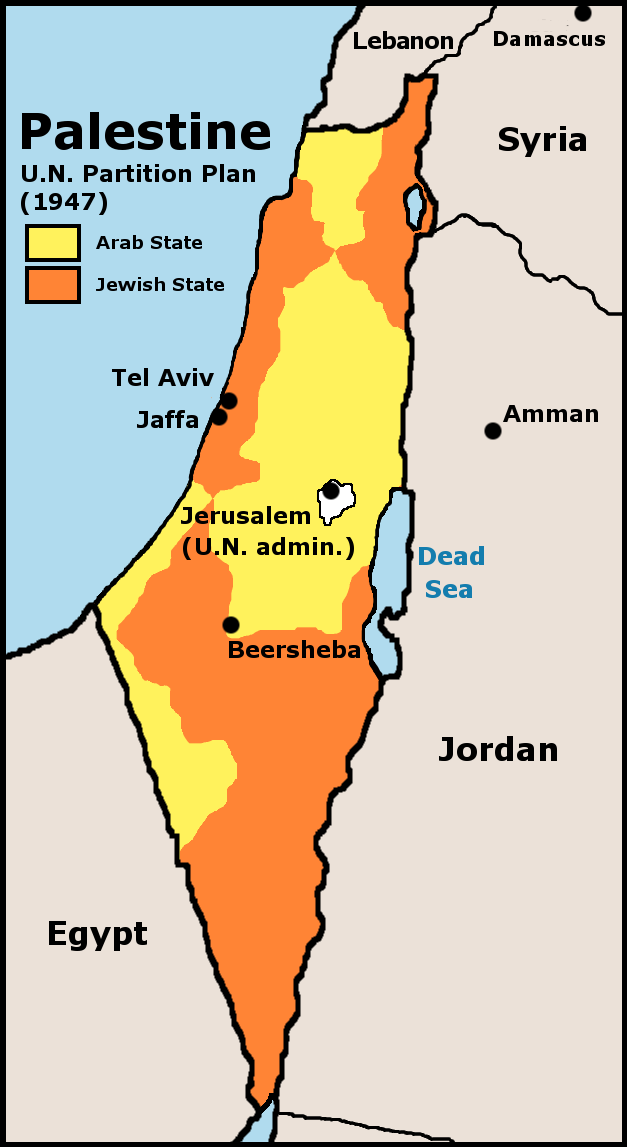
UN Partition Plan For Palestine 1947

This is a Timeline of modern Israeli history, comprising important legal and territorial changes and political events in Israel and its predecessor entities from 1881 onward, along with important events in Jewish history and the history of Zionism from that year on.

== 1800-1900 ==
| Year | Date | Event |
|---|---|---|
| 1881 | 13 March | Tsar Alexander II of Russia is assassinated, triggering multiple waves of Jewish pogroms after some blamed "agents of foreign influence", a term often directed at Jewish communities. |
| 1881-1903 | | The First Aliyah describes the initial major wave of Jewish immigration to Palestine motivated by persecution and economic hardship. |
| 1882 | 15 May | The Russian emperor Alexander III issued the May Laws, severely restricting the rights of Jews in the Pale of Settlement, and intensifying Jewish emmigration. |
| 1894 | December | The Dreyfus Affair was a political scandal in France that involved the wrongful conviction of Jewish army officer, Alfred Dreyfus. It is one of the most notable examples of antisemitism and miscarriage of justice. |
| 1896 | February | Theodor Herzl published Der Judenstaat, arguing for the establishment of an independent Jewish state. |
| 1897 | 29 August | The First Zionist Congress constituted 218 delegates of Zionist organizations, most from Eastern Europe, convened in Basel. It was instrumental in the formation of the Zionist platform, founding of the World Zionist Organization, and helped unify the Zionist movement. |

== 1900-2000 ==
| Year | Date | Event |
|---|---|---|
| 1901 | | The Jewish National Fund is established to buy land and encourage Jewish settlement in Palestine. |
| 1915-1916 | | British diplomats and the Sharif of Mecca exchange the McMahon-Hussein Correspondence, in which Britain promises an independent Arab state, which would include Palestine, in exchange for supporting the British against the Ottoman Empire in the First World War. |
| 1916 | 3 January | Britain, France, Russia, and Italy sign the secret Sykes-Picot Agreement which would partition the Ottoman Empire in the event of an Allied victory. |
| 1917 | 2 November | The Balfour Declaration issued by the British Government called for a national home for the Jewish People in Palestine, which was seen as a contradiction by some. |
| 1917 | 23 November | The Bolsheviks make the terms of the Sykes-Picot Agreement public, exposing contradicting promises made in the McMahon-Hussein Correspondence and the Balfour Declaration. |
| 1919 | 3 January | Chaim Weizmann and Emir Faisal, son of the Sharif of Mecca, sign the Faisal-Weizmann agreement, promising Jewish support and development in Palestine. Faisal's approval was contingent on the fulfillment of British promises to him. |
| 1920 | 25 April | The League of Nations assigns Britain the creation of Mandatory Palestine. |
| 1920 | June | Jewish paramilitary organization Haganah is formed with the purpose of defending Jewish settlements against Arab attacks. |
| 1920 | 4-7 April | 1920 Jerusalem riots were attacks on Jewish lives and property by Arabs, leaving 216 Jewish casualties and 25 Arab casualties. |
| 1920 | 1 July | The Palin Commission is created to investigate the 1920 Jerusalem riots. They report that Arab rioters attacked Jewish lives and property, and that the cause was attributed to the disappointment that stemmed from unfulfilled promises to them by the British. |
| 1921 | 12-30 March | The 1921 Cairo Conference convened by Britain aimed to organize the Middle East boundaries and develop a policy of governance. Arab and Jewish delegations were invited to advise or provide input. The conference established the division of Mandatory Palestine into Transjordan, and Palestine with Emir Abdullah ruling semi-autonomously in the former. His brother, Emir Faisal would be crowned King of Iraq. |
| 1921 | October | The Haycraft Commission is created to investigate the 1921 Jaffa riots. The report blamed Arabs for the violence but notes growing Arab resentment of British policy, seemingly favoring Jewish communities and ambitions at the expense of the Arab population. |
| 1922 | 3 June | Winston Churchill drafts the Churchill White Paper. In it contains Britain's will to maintain their commitment to the Balfour Declaration, calls for restrictions on Jewish immigration, clarification that Palestine would not become a Jewish State. This would be the governoring policy in the region until 1939. |
| 1923 | 29 September | British Mandate for Palestine comes into effect. |
| 1929 | 23-29 August | 1929 Palestine riots were a series of violent demonstrations and riots involving access over the Western Wall in Jerusalem. The riots lead to 472 Jewish casualties and 348 Arab casualties. |
| 1930 | March | The Shaw Commission is created to investigate the 1929 Palestine riots. The report concludes that riots were caused by Arab fears over Jewish immigration and land acquisition. It recommends restrictions on Jewish land purchases and immigration, an inquiry to support the rapidly growing rural Palestinian population, and clairty regarding British policy. |
| 1930 | October | The Passfield White Paper is drafted to implement recommendations made by the Shaw Commission and Hope Simpson Enquiry. The tone of the paper was considered anti-zionist by many. |
| 1931 | 13 February | The MacDonald letter written by British prime minister Ramsay MacDonald to Chaim Weizmann to clarify the new Passfield White Paper. It is considered to be an informal withdrawal of the Passfield White Paper. |
| 1931 | 10 April | Jewish paramilitary organization Irgun is founded. Irgun policy was based on Revisionist Zionism |
| 1936-1939 | | The 1936-1939 Palestinian Revolt was a movement calling for independence from British colonial rule and the end to British support for Zionism. 5000+ Arabs, 300+ Jews, and 262 Britons were killed, with at least 15,000 Arabs wounded. |
| 1939–1945 | | World War II: Germany invades Poland and The Holocaust occurred in German-occupied Europe killing 6 million Jews. |
| 1946 | July 22 | Jewish terrorists bombed the King David Hotel. The terrorist attack was carried out by the Zionist paramilitary group Irgun. 91 people of various nationalities, including Britons, Arabs and Jews, were killed and 45 people were injured by the militant right-wing group. |
| 1947 | 25 November | United Nations Partition Plan for Palestine that proposed a creation of one Arab state and one Jewish state passes with the Jewish leaders accepted and Arab states rejected the move. A major civil war between the Arab populations and Jewish populations began shortly after. |
| 1948 | 14 May | On the last day of the British Mandate, David Ben-Gurion, executive head of the Zionist Organization and chairman of the Jewish Agency for Palestine, issued the Israeli Declaration of Independence which declared the establishment of a Jewish state in the Land of Israel to be known as the State of Israel, which covered part of the territory of what had been Mandatory Palestine. |
| 1948 | 15 May | 1948 Arab–Israeli War: Hours after the expiration of the British Mandate of Palestine, Iraq, Egypt, Jordan and Syria invaded Israel. |
| 1949 | 25 January | 1949 Israeli legislative election: Elections were held to a constituent assembly. Ben-Gurion's center-left Mapai won a plurality of seats. |
| 1949 | 24 February | 1948 Arab–Israeli War: The first of the 1949 Armistice Agreements ending the war was signed between Israel and Egypt. An armistice line was agreed along the prewar border with the exception that Egypt remained in control of the Gaza Strip. |
| 1949 | 8 March | The first government of Israel, in which Mapai, the Jewish United Religious Front, the liberal Progressive Party, the Sephardim and Oriental Communities and the Arab Democratic List of Nazareth ruled in coalition with Ben-Gurion as prime minister, was established. |
| 1949 | 11 May | The General Assembly of the United Nations adopted United Nations General Assembly Resolution 273, according to which Israel was admitted to membership. |
| 1949 | 13 December | Ben-Gurion proclaimed Jerusalem the capital of Israel. |
| 1950 | 5 July | The Israeli legislature the Knesset passed the Law of Return, which granted all Jews the right to migrate to and settle in Israel and obtain citizenship. |
| 1956 | 26 July | Suez Crisis: In a broadcast speech, Egyptian president Gamal Abdel Nasser gave a codeword order for the occupation and nationalization of the Suez Canal and the closure of the Straits of Tiran to Israeli shipping. |
| 1956 | 29 October | Suez Crisis: The Israeli air force began bombing Egyptian forces in the Sinai Peninsula. |
| 1960 | 11 May | Eight agents of the Israeli internal security service Shin Bet and its foreign intelligence service Mossad abducted Adolf Eichmann, the Nazi officer primarily responsible for the actual implementation of the Holocaust, near his home in San Fernando, Buenos Aires. |
| 1966 | | The martial law imposed on Israeli Arabs from the founding of the State of Israel was lifted completely. |
| 1967 | 5 June | Six-Day War: The Israeli air force destroyed the Egyptian air force on the ground over a period of three hours. |
| 1967 | 11 June | Six-Day War: Israel signed a ceasefire with its enemies Egypt, Syria, Jordan, Lebanon and Iraq. It remained in control of the formerly Egyptian Gaza Strip and Sinai Peninsula, the Syrian Golan Heights and the Jordanian West Bank and East Jerusalem. |
| 1967 | 30 June | Mayor Teddy Kollek of Jerusalem announced that the city had been fully reunified. |
| 1973 | 21 February | A Boeing 727-200 serving as Libyan Arab Airlines Flight 114 from Tripoli to Cairo was shot down over the Sinai Peninsula by Israeli fighter aircraft, killing over one hundred passengers and crew. |
| 1973 | 21 July | Lillehammer affair: A team of fifteen Mossad agents assassinated a Moroccan waiter in Lillehammer in a case of mistaken identity. |
| 1973 | 6 October | Yom Kippur War: Egyptian and Syrian forces simultaneously attacked Israeli positions in the Sinai Peninsula and the Golan Heights, respectively, on the Jewish holiday of Yom Kippur. |
| 1973 | 14 October | Operation Nickel Grass: The United States began an airlift of tanks, artillery, ammunition and supplies to Israel. |
| 1973 | 25 October | Yom Kippur War: Israel, Egypt and Syria agreed to a ceasefire. Israel remained in control of new territory north of the Golan Heights and west of the Suez Canal in the south. |
| 1976 | 4 July | Operation Entebbe: Sayeret Matkal freed some hundred hostages held at Entebbe International Airport by hijackers belonging to the Palestinian nationalist Popular Front for the Liberation of Palestine – External Operations and the far-left Revolutionary Cells. |
| 1977 | 10 May | 1977 Israeli Air Force Sikorsky CH-53 Sea Stallion crash: An Israeli Air Force Sikorsky CH-53 Sea Stallion crashed in the Jordan Valley, killing fifty-four soldiers. |
| 1978 | 17 September | Israel and Egypt signed the Camp David Accords at the White House. The framework agreement provided for the establishment of an autonomous authority in the West Bank and Gaza Strip and for withdrawal of Israeli forces from the Sinai Peninsula in exchange for the establishment of full diplomatic relations with Egypt. |
| 1979 | 26 March | Egypt and Israel signed the Egypt–Israel peace treaty under the framework of the Camp David Accords at the White House. |
| 1980 | 24 February | The old Israeli shekel replaced the Israeli pound as the currency of Israel. |
| 1980 | 30 July | The Knesset passed the Jerusalem Law, asserting that Jerusalem was and would remain the undivided capital of Israel. |
| 1981 | 7 June | Operation Opera: Israel carried out a surprise air strike on an Iraqi nuclear reactor eleven miles southeast of Baghdad. |
| 1982 | 23 April | The Israel Defense Forces (IDF) forcibly evacuated Yamit per the terms of the Egypt–Israel peace treaty. |
| 1982 | 3 June | Shlomo Argov, the Israeli ambassador to the United Kingdom, was shot in the head in London in an attempted assassination organized by Iraq's Iraqi Intelligence Service and carried out by the Palestinian nationalist Abu Nidal Organization. |
| 1982 | 6 June | 1982 Lebanon War: The IDF invaded southern Lebanon in response to repeated attacks by the Palestinian nationalist Palestine Liberation Organization (PLO), whose militants were sheltered there, on Israeli civilians. |
| 1984 | 12 April | Bus 300 affair: Four Palestinian nationalists hijacked a bus from Tel Aviv to Ashkelon and took its forty passengers hostage. |
| 1984 | 21 November | Operation Moses: The first of some eight thousand Ethiopian Jews were covertly evacuated to Israel from refugee camps in Sudan. |
| 1985 | 5 January | Operation Moses: Prime minister Shimon Peres confirmed the existence of the airlift. Sudan immediately halted flights. |
| 1987 | 30 August | The Cabinet voted to cancel development of the IAI Lavi. |
| 1987 | 9 December | First Intifada: Protests began in the Jabalia Camp in response to the death of four Palestinian civilians in a car crash with an IDF truck. |
| 1989 | 19 September | Mount Carmel Forest Fire: A forest fire began on Mount Carmel which would burn over two square miles over the next three days. |
| 1991 | 22 January | Gulf War: An Iraqi Scud missile landed in Ramat Gan, killing three and injuring nearly a hundred. |
| 1991 | 24 May | Operation Solomon: An airlift began which would transport some fourteen thousand Ethiopian Jews from Ethiopia to Israel over a thirty-six-hour period. |
| 1991 | 30 October | Madrid Conference of 1991: A conference opened in Madrid with the goal of reviving the Israeli–Palestinian peace process. |
| 1992 | 17 December | Israel deported some four hundred Palestinians to Lebanon. |
| 1993 | 13 September | Israel and the PLO signed the Oslo I Accord in Washington, D.C. The accords provided for the withdrawal of some IDF forces from the West Bank and Gaza Strip and for the establishment of a self-governing authority for the Palestinians, the Palestinian National Authority. |
| 1994 | 26 October | Israel and Jordan signed the Israel–Jordan peace treaty in the Arabah. The treaty clarified the borders of the two countries and their water rights; each pledged that neither would allow a third country to use its territory to stage an attack on the other. |
| 1995 | 4 November | Assassination of Yitzhak Rabin: The radical nationalist Yigal Amir, an opponent of the Oslo Accords, shot and killed prime minister Yitzhak Rabin after a rally in Tel Aviv. |
| 1997 | 4 February | 1997 Israeli helicopter disaster: Two transport helicopters en route to southern Lebanon collided in midair above She'ar Yashuv, killing all on board. |
| 1997 | 14 July | Maccabiah bridge collapse: A pedestrian bridge collapsed over the Yarkon River in Tel Aviv, killing four. |
| 2000 | 24 May | Israel withdrew the last of its forces from southern Lebanon. |
| 2000 | 1 October | October 2000 events: The first of a series of riots began in which thirteen Arabs and one Jew would be killed over nine days. |
| 2000 | 7 October | 2000 Hezbollah cross-border raid: The Lebanese Shia Islamist militant group and political party Hezbollah abducted three Israeli soldiers from the Israeli administered side of the Blue Line, the internationally recognized border. |

== 2000-present ==
| Year | Date | Event |
|---|---|---|
| 2001 | 17 October | Assassination of Rehavam Ze'evi: Tourism minister Rehavam Ze'evi was shot at a Jerusalem hotel by Hamdi Quran of the Palestinian nationalist Popular Front for the Liberation of Palestine. He died of his injuries that night in hospital. |
| 2002 | 23 June | Construction of the Israeli West Bank barrier began. |
| 2004 | 29 January | Some four hundred prisoners, the remains of sixty Lebanese militants and civilians, and maps showing the locations of Israeli mines in southern Lebanon, were transferred to Hezbollah in exchange for the bodies of the three soldiers abducted in 2000, as well as the abducted Israeli reservist Elhanan Tannenbaum. |
| 2005 | 12 September | Israeli disengagement from Gaza: The last Israeli settlers and security personnel were withdrawn from the Gaza Strip. |
| 2006 | 4 January | Prime minister Ariel Sharon suffered a severe hemorrhagic stroke and fell into a coma. The designated acting prime minister Ehud Olmert became acting prime minister. |
| 2006 | 12 July | 2006 Hezbollah cross-border raid: Hezbollah forces crossed into Israel and ambushed two IDF vehicles, killing three soldiers and capturing two others. |
| 2006 | 12 July | 2006 Lebanon War: Israeli forces began shelling Lebanese territory in response to the Hezbollah attack of earlier that morning. |
| 2007 | 6 September | Operation Orchard: Israel carried out a surprise air strike on a suspected nuclear reactor in Syria's Deir ez-Zor Governorate. |
| 2008 | 27 December | Gaza War: Israel began conducting a series of airstrikes on assets of the Palestinian Sunni Islamist organization Hamas in the Gaza Strip in response to ongoing rocket fire on the western Negev. |
| 2009 | 18 January | Gaza War (2008–09): The war ended with a unilateral Israeli ceasefire. |
| 2010 | 31 May | Gaza flotilla raid: The navy boarded a flotilla organized by the Free Gaza Movement and the Turkish Foundation for Human Rights and Freedoms and Humanitarian Relief, which was attempting to break an Israeli and Egyptian blockade of the Gaza Strip, in international waters. During the takeover, a violent confrontation erupted on board the MV Mavi Marmara in which nine activists were killed. |
| 2010 | 2 December | Mount Carmel Forest Fire: A forest fire began on Mount Carmel which would kill forty and burn nearly twenty square miles over the next three days. |
| 2011 | 14 July | 2011 Israeli social justice protests: Filmmaker Daphni Leef set up a tent in Habima Square and invited others to join a protest over the absence of affordable housing. |
| 2011 | 10 September | 2011 attack on the Israeli Embassy in Egypt: A crowd of thousands of Egyptian protestors breached the Israeli embassy in Cairo. |
| 2011 | 18 October | Gilad Shalit prisoner exchange: Hamas released the Israeli soldier Gilad Shalit to Egypt in exchange for one thousand Palestinian other Arab prisoners held in Israel, including some three hundred serving life sentences for planning and perpetrating terror attacks. |
| 2012 | 14 November | Operation Pillar of Defense: The IDF began an eight-day anti-Hamas operation in the Gaza Strip, a response to ongoing rocket fire on the western Negev, with an airstrike on the senior officer Ahmed Jabari. |
| 2014 | 8 July | 2014 Israel–Gaza conflict: The IDF launched a series of airstrikes against Hamas targets in the Gaza Strip. |
| 2017 | 6 December | United States recognition of Jerusalem as the capital of Israel: U.S. president Donald Trump formally announces the United States recognition of Jerusalem as the capital of Israel. |
| 2019 | 25 March | United States recognition of Israel's sovereignty over the Golan Heights: U.S. president Donald Trump signed a presidential proclamation to officially recognize Israel's sovereignty over the Golan Heights. |
| 2020 | 10 December | Israel–Morocco normalization agreement: Following the Abraham Accords, Israel and Morocco signed a security cooperation agreement and began normalizing relations. |
| 2021 | 30 April | 2021 Meron stampede: The deadliest civil disaster in Israel's history. |
| 2021 | May | 2021 Israel–Palestine crisis |
| 2021 | 16 June | Naftali Bennett of the Yamina party was sworn in as Prime Minister, forming a coalition government with Yair Lapid of the Yesh Atid party, marking the end of Benjamin Netanyahu's 12-year tenure as prime minister. |
| 2021 | 14 July | Israel opened its embassy in the United Arab Emirates in accordance with the Abraham Accords |
| 2022 | 11 May | Al Jazeera journalist Shireen Abu Akleh was shot and killed while covering an Israeli military raid in Jenin. Her death led to international condemnation and calls for an investigation into the circumstances of the shooting. |
| 2022 | 30 June | The Israeli Knesset voted to dissolve itself, triggering the fifth election in less than four years. |
| 2022 | 1 November | Israel held its fifth election in less than four years, resulting in a victory for Benjamin Netanyahu's Likud party, which led to the formation of a controversial right-wing government. |
| 2023 | 7 January | 2023 Israeli judicial reform protests: Large-scale protests erupted across Israel in response to proposed judicial reforms by the Netanyahu government, which critics argued would undermine judicial independence. |
| 2023 | 9 May | Operation Shield and Arrow: The IDF launched a series of airstrikes against Palestinian Islamic Jihad targets in Gaza following rocket fire towards southern Israel. |
| 2023 | 7 October | October 7 attacks and Gaza war: Hamas and several other Palestinian militant groups launched coordinated armed incursions from the Gaza Strip into southern Israel, killing 1,143 and taking 250 hostages, marking the deadliest attack in Israeli history and the first invasion of Israeli territory since the 1948 Arab–Israeli War. |
| 2023 | 8 October | Israel–Hezbollah conflict: Hezbollah begins attacking northern Israel and the occupied Golan Heights. |
| 2023 | 27 October | Israeli invasion of the Gaza Strip: The IDF launched a full-scale invasion of the Gaza Strip with the goal of eliminating Hamas and releasing the hostages. |

== See also ==
=== Timelines of older periods and wider concepts ===
- Timeline of Jewish history - for the Jewish people
- Timeline of the Palestine region - for the territory
- Timeline of Zionism - for the state ideology

=== Other ===
- Antisemitism
  - Geography of antisemitism
  - History of antisemitism
  - Timeline of antisemitism
- Anti-Zionism
  - Timeline of anti-Zionism
- History of Israel
- History of Palestine
- History of Zionism
- Jewish history
- List of timelines
- List of years in Israel
- Outline of Israel
- Timeline of the Arab–Israeli conflict
- Timeline of the Israeli–Palestinian conflict
