= Timeline of Jewish history =

This is a list of notable events in the development of Jewish history. All dates are given according to the Common Era, not the Hebrew calendar.

== Ancient Israel and Judah (2000–586 BCE) ==
| Year | History | Image |
|---|---|---|
| 2000-1800 | The start of the Age of Patriarchs with Abraham, and the origin for the Abrahamic Religions, mentioned in the Hebrew Bible, Christian Bible and the Quran respectively | Abraham by Guercino |
| 1900 | The Second patriarch Isaac, the long-awaited son of Abraham and Sarah, was nearly sacrificed by his father in a test of faith | Isaac by Jusepe de Ribera |
| 1800-1700 | The Third Patriarch Jacob, after deceiving his brother Esau for the birthright, fled, married Leah and Rachel, fathered the twelve tribes of Israel, and was renamed Israel by God | Jacob by Jan Victors |
| 1700-1600 | In the Book of Genesis. Joseph, the eleventh son of Jacob, was sold into slavery by his jealous brothers, rose to power in Egypt through his wisdom and God's favor, and ultimately forgave and saved his family during a severe famine. | |
| Between 15th Century and 13th Century BCE | The enslavement of the Jews in Egypt when a new Pharaoh feared their growing population, leading to their oppression and forced labor | |
| 1446-1312-1290? | Moses led the Israelites out of slavery in Egypt, leading them on a journey that followed 40 years of wandering in the desert. they crossed through the Red Sea, Received the Torah, including the Ten Commandments at Mount Sinai and ultimately made their way toward the Promised Land during the Exodus. | The Crossing of The Red Sea |
| 1380-1045? | Biblical judges lead the jewish people. Othniel, Ehud, Shamgar, Deborah, Gideon, Tola, Jair, Jephthah, Ibzan, Elon, Abdon, and Samson. | Samson by Lucas Cranach the Elder |
| 1021-1000 | The reign of King Saul, the first monarch of the ancient Kingdom of Israel. | King Saul by Ernst Josephson |
| 1000-970 | Reign of King David over ancient Kingdom of Israel, he established Jerusalem as the political and spiritual capital | King David by Gerard van Honthorst |
| 970-931 | Reign of King Solomon over the ancient Kingdom of Israel. After his death, the kingdom was divided into the Northern Kingdom of Israel and the Southern Kingdom of Judah | King Solomon by Simeon Solomon |
| 960 | Solomon's Temple in Jerusalem completed | |
| 931 | Split between Northern Kingdom of Israel (Samaria) and the Southern Kingdom of Judah | |
| 931-913 | Reign of King Rehoboam of Judah, the first monarch of the Kingdom of Judah | King Rehoboam of Judah by Hans Hollein |
| 931-910 | Reign of King Jeroboam of Israel, the first monarch of the Kingdom of Israel after the split | King Jeroboam of Israel by Jean-Honoré Fragonard |
| 840 | The Mesha Inscription, also known as the Moabite Stone, tells the victory of King Mesha of Moab over the son of King Omri of Israel | Mesha Inscription |
| 740-700 | The Prophecy of Isaiah, which was recorded in the Book of Isaiah in the Hebrew Bible and the Old Testament Bible. | Isaiah by Michelangelo |
| 740-698 | The Prophecy of Micah, which was recorded in the Book of Micah in the Hebrew Bible and the Old Testament Bible. | |
| 740-722 | The Kingdom of Israel falls to the Neo-Assyrian Empire, The fall of Israel resulted in the deportation of many Israelites, often referred to as the "Lost Ten Tribes", This marked the end of the Northern Kingdom of Israel, leaving only the Southern Kingdom of Judah. | |
| 715-687 | King Hezekiah of Judah, Thirteenth King of Judah | King Hezekiah |
| 649-609 | King Josiah of Judah instituted major reforms, destroyed pagan altars and shrines, and renewed the covenant between G-d and the people of Judah reinforcing monotheism and the exclusive worship of Yahweh. | |
| 629-587 | Prophecy of Jeremiah, He prophesied during a tumultuous time that preceded the fall of Jerusalem and the Babylonian exile. | |
| 600 | The Ketef Hinnom scrolls or Amulets, are recognized as the oldest known surviving texts from the Hebrew Bible. | |
| 597 | The first deportation of the Judean Israelites to Babylon, when King Nebuchadnezzar II captured Jerusalem and exiled King Jehoiachin, along with a significant portion of the population. | Babylonian Exile by James Tissot |
| 597–586 | The Neo-Babylonian Empire under the rule of Nebuchadnezzar II occupied the Kingdom of Judah | |
| 586 | Jerusalem falls to King Nebuchadnezzar II leading to the destruction of Solomon's Temple. | |

== Second Temple period ==
=== 539–1 BCE ===
| Year | History | Image |
|---|---|---|
| 539 | Jews were allowed to Return to Zion, with Cyrus II of the Achaemenid Empire's permission. | |
| 520 | The Prophecy of Zechariah | |
| 520 | Zerubbabel guides the initial group of Jews returning from captivity to Jerusalem | |
| 516 | The Second Temple in Jerusalem is consecrated, symbolizing the restoration of Jewish worship after the Babylonian exile. | Model of the Second Temple |
| 475 | As recounted in the Book of Esther. Often associated with Xerxes I of Persia, Queen Esther disclosed her identity to the king and began to advocate for her people, identifying Haman as the conspirator scheming to annihilate them. | |
| 460 | Ezra's Mission, recounted in the Book of Ezra. With anarchy brewing in Judea, Xerxes' successor Persian King Artaxerxes sent Ezra to restore order. | |
| 332 | Alexander the Great the King of Macedonia, one of the largest empires of the ancient world, stretching from Macedonia to Egypt and Greece to northwestern India conquers Phoenicia and the Levant | Sculpture of Alexander the Great |
| 332? | Alexander visited Judea to meet High Priest Jaddus, who showed him the prophecy of Alexander's life and conquests from the Book of Daniel. This account is regarded as apocryphal and likely created in the early Hasmonean period | |
| 150-100 | At some point during this period, the Tanakh (Hebrew Bible) was finalized and canonized. Jewish religious texts written after Ezra's time were not included in the canon, though they gained popularity among various Jewish groups. Later works incorporated into the Greek translation of the Bible (the Septuagint) came to be known as the deuterocanonical books. | Set of scrolls comprising the entire Tanakh |
| 140-63 | The Hasmonean dynasty rules Judea. The Hasmonean kingdom expands outward to Idumea, Samaria, Perea, Galilee, and Gilead due to weakness and dissolution within the Seleucid Empire. | |
| 63 | Pompey laid siege to and entered the Temple, and Judea became a client kingdom of the Roman Republic. | |
| 40 | Herod the Great was appointed King of the Jews by the Roman Senate, replacing the Hasmonean dynasty with the Herodian dynasty. | |
| 6-4 | Jesus of Nazareth was born in Bethlehem, Herodian Kingdom. | Birth of Jesus by Hans Pleydenwurff |

=== 1st century CE ===
| Year | History | Image |
|---|---|---|
| 6 | Province of Roman Judea created by merging Judea proper, Samaria and Idumea. | |
| 6 | Hillel the Elder, considered the greatest Torah sage, dies, leading to the dominance of Shammai till 30 CE, see also Hillel and Shammai. | |
| 26-36 | Sanhedrin trial of Jesus took place before Pontius Pilate, the Governor of the Roman province of Judaea's Roman trial of Jesus. Following this Roman trial, Jesus was crucified, marking a pivotal moment in history. This event laid the foundation for Christianity, as the Apostles began to spread the Gospel message to various communities including the Jewish ones. | Crucifixion of Christ as depicted by Giotto |
| 30 | Helena of Adiabene and many members of the Adiabene population convert to Judaism. | |
| 30-70 | Schism within Judaism during the Second Temple period. A sect within Hellenised Jewish society starts Jewish Christianity, see also Rejection of Jesus. | |
| 66-135 | Start of the Jewish–Roman wars which resulted in a Roman victory, and the destruction of Jerusalem and the Temple, During the siege, approximately 1,100,000 people were killed, and 97,000 were captured and enslaved. This conflict also contributed to the separation of Christianity from Judaism, following this defeat, Roman Judea remained under Roman control, renamed and merged into the province of Syria Palaestina. The Sanhedrin was relocated to Yavne by Yochanan ben Zakai, see also Council of Jamnia. Fiscus Judaicus levied on all Jews of the Roman Empire whether they aided the revolt or not. (War ended 135 CE) | Siege and Destruction of Jerusalem by the Romans (1850 painting by David Roberts) Depiction of the Roman triumph celebrating the Sack of Jerusalem on the Arch of Titus in Rome. |
| 70-200 | Period of the Tannaim, rabbis who organized and elucidated the Oral Torah. The decisions of the Tannaim are contained in the Mishnah, Beraita, Tosefta, and various Midrash compilations. | |
| 73 | Final events of the First Jewish–Roman War – the fall of Masada. Christianity starts off as a Jewish sect and then develops its own texts and ideology and branches off from Judaism to become a distinct religion. | |

== Talmudic period (70–640 CE) ==
=== 2nd century ===
115–117
Kitos War (Revolt against Trajan) – a second Jewish-Roman War initiated in large Jewish communities of Cyprus, Cyrene (modern Libya), Aegipta (modern Egypt) and Mesopotamia (modern Syria and Iraq). It led to mutual killing of hundreds of thousands Jews, Greeks and Romans, ending with a total defeat of Jewish rebels and complete extermination of Jews in Cyprus and Cyrene by the newly installed Emperor Hadrian.

131–136
The Roman emperor Hadrian, among other provocations, renames Jerusalem "Aelia Capitolina" and prohibits circumcision. Simon bar Kokhba (Bar Kosiba) leads a large Jewish revolt against Rome in response to Hadrian's actions. In the aftermath, most Jewish population is annihilated (about 580,000 killed) and Hadrian renames the province of Judea to Syria Palaestina, and attempts to root out Judaism.

136
Rabbi Akiva is martyred.

138
Emperor Hadrian dies and, as a result, the persecution of Jews in Rome is lessened.

=== 3rd century ===
200
The Mishnah, the standardization of the Jewish oral law as it stands today, is redacted by Judah haNasi in the land of Israel.

259
Nehardea in Babylonia destroyed by the Palmyrenes, which destruction caused the widespread dispersion of Jews in the region.

220–500
Period of the Amoraim, the rabbis of the Talmud.

=== 4th century ===
315–337
Roman Emperor Constantine I enacts new restrictive legislation. Conversion of Christians to Judaism is outlawed, congregations for religious services are curtailed, but Jews are also allowed to enter Jerusalem on the anniversary of the Temple's destruction.

351–352
Jewish revolt against Constantius Gallus is put down. Sepphoris is razed to the ground.

358
Because of the increasing danger of Roman persecution, Hillel II creates a mathematical calendar for calculating the Jewish month. After adopting the calendar, the Sanhedrin in Tiberias is dissolved.

361–363
The last pagan Roman Emperor, Julian, allows the Jews to return to "holy Jerusalem which you have for many years longed to see rebuilt" and to rebuild the Second Temple. Shortly after, the Emperor is assassinated, and the plan is dissolved.

363
Galilee earthquake of 363

379
In India, the Hindu king Sira Primal, also known as Iru Brahman, issued what was engraved on a tablet of brass, his permission to Jews to live freely, build synagogue, own property without conditions attached and as long as the world and moon exist.

=== 5th century ===
438
The Empress Eudocia removes the ban on Jews' praying at the Temple site and the heads of the Community in Galilee issue a call "to the great and mighty people of the Jews": "Know that the end of the exile of our people has come"!

450
Redaction of the Jerusalem Talmud

=== 6th century ===
500–523
Yosef Dhu Nuwas, King of Himyarite Kingdom (Modern Yemen) converting to Judaism, upgrading existing Yemenese Jewish center. His kingdom falls in a war against Axum and the Christians.

550
The main redaction of Babylonian Talmud is completed under Rabbis Ravina and Ashi. To a lesser degree, the text continues to be modified for the next 200 years.

550–700
Period of the Savoraim, the sages in Persia who put the Talmud in its final form.

555–572
The Fourth Samaritan Revolt against Byzantium results in great reduction of the Samaritan community, their Israelite faith is outlawed. Neighbouring Jews, who mostly reside in Galilee, are also affected by the oppressive rule of the Byzantines.

=== 7th century ===
610–628
Jews of Galilee led by Benjamin of Tiberias gain autonomy in Jerusalem after revolting against Heraclius as a joint military campaign with ally Sassanid Empire under Khosrau II and Jewish militias from Persia, but are subsequently massacred.

612
Sisebut, king of the Visigoths, forces his Jewish subjects to convert to Christianity.

7th century
The rise and domination of Islam among largely pagan Arabs in the Arabian Peninsula results in the almost complete removal and conversion of the ancient Jewish communities there, and sack of Levant from the hands of Byzantines.

== Middle Ages ==
=== 8th century ===
700–1250
Period of the Gaonim (the Gaonic era). Most Jews lived in the Muslim Arab realm (Andalusia, North Africa, Palestine, Iraq and Yemen), others living in Christian southern Europe and Asia Minor. Despite general discrimination and sporadic periods of persecution in this period, Jewish communal and cultural life flowered. The universally recognized centers of Jewish life were in Jerusalem and Tiberias (Syria), Sura and Pumbeditha (Iraq). The heads of these law schools were the Gaonim, who were consulted on matters of law by Jews throughout the world. During this time, the Niqqud is invented in Tiberias.

711
Umayyad armies invade and occupy most of Spain (at this time Jews made up about 8% of Spain's population). Under Visigothic rule, Jews had been subject to frequent and intense persecution, which was formalized under Muslim rule due to the dhimmi rules in Islam. Jews and Christians had to pay the jizya. Some sources mark this as the beginning of the Golden age of Jewish culture in Spain, although most mention 912.

740
The Khazar (a Turkic semi-nomadic people from Central Asia) King and members of the upper class adopt Judaism.

760
The Karaites reject the authority of the oral law, and split off from rabbinic Judaism.

=== 9th century ===
807
Abbasid Caliph Harun al-Rashid orders all Jews in the Caliphate to wear a yellow belt, with Christians to wear a blue one.

846
In Sura, Iraq, Rav Amram Gaon compiles his siddur (Jewish prayer book.)

850
al-Mutawakkil made a decree ordering dhimmi Jews and Christians to wear garments distinguishing them from Muslims, their places of worship to be destroyed, and allowing them little involvement in government or official matters.

871
An incomplete marriage contract dated to October 6 of this year is the earliest dated document found in the papers of the Cairo Geniza.

888
The Aghlabids require dhimmis in the Maghreb and Sicily to wear a patch (ruq'a) of white fabric on the shoulder of their outer garment, with the patch for Jews being in the image of an ape.

=== 10th century ===
912–1013
The Golden age of Jewish culture in Spain. Abd-ar-Rahman III becomes Caliph of Spain in 912, ushering in the height of tolerance. Muslims granted Jews and Christians exemptions from military service, the right to their own courts of law, and a guarantee of safety of their property. Jewish poets, scholars, scientists, statesmen and philosophers flourished in and were an integral part of the extensive Arab civilization. This period ended with the Cordoba massacre in 1013.

940
In Iraq, Saadia Gaon compiles his siddur (Jewish prayer book).

945
In the Serenissima Repubblica di Venezia, the Senate forbids sea captains from accepting Jewish passengers.

=== 11th century ===
1008–1013
Caliph Al-Hakim bi-Amr Allah ("the Mad") issues severe restrictions against Jews in the Fatimid Caliphate. All Jews are forced to wear a heavy wooden "golden calf" around their necks. Christians have to wear a large wooden cross and members of both groups had to wear black hats.

1013
During the fall of the city, Sulayman's troops looted Córdoba and massacred citizens of the city, including many Jews. Prominent Jews in Córdoba, such as Samuel ibn Naghrela were forced to flee to the city in 1013.

1013–1073
Rabbi Yitchaki Alfassi (from Morocco, later Spain) writes the Rif, an important work of Jewish law.

1016
The Jewish community of Kairouan, Tunisia is forced to choose between conversion and expulsion.

1033
Following their conquest of the city from the Maghrawa tribe, the forces of Tamim, chief of the Zenata Berber Banu Ifran tribe, perpetrated a massacre of Jews in Fez.

1040–1105
Rabbi Shlomo Yitzhaki (Rashi) writes important commentaries on almost the entire Tanakh and Talmud.

1066 December 30
Granada massacre: Muslim mob stormed the royal palace in Granada, crucified Jewish vizier Joseph ibn Naghrela and massacred most of the Jewish population of the city. "More than 1,500 Jewish families, numbering 4,000 persons, fell in one day."

1090
Granada was captured by Yusuf ibn Tashfin, King of the Almoravides. The Jewish community, believed to have sided with the Christians, was destroyed. Many fled, penniless, to Christian Toledo.

1095–1291
Christian Crusades begin, sparking warfare with Islam in Palestine. Crusaders temporarily capture Jerusalem in 1099. Tens of thousands of Jews are killed by European crusaders throughout Europe and in the Middle East.

=== 12th century ===
1100–1275
Time of the tosafot, Talmudic commentators who carried on Rashi's work. They include some of his descendants.

1107
Moroccan Almoravid ruler Yusuf ibn Tashfin expels Moroccan Jews who do not convert to Islam.

1135–1204
Rabbi Moses ben Maimon, aka Maimonides or the Rambam is the leading rabbi of Sephardic Jewry. Among his many accomplishments, he writes one of the most influential codes of law (The Mishneh Torah) in Jewish History as well as, in Arabic, many philosophical works including the (Guide for the Perplexed).

1141
Yehuda Halevi issues a call to the Jews to emigrate to Palestine. He is buried in Jerusalem.

1150–1230
The Almohads conquer southern Spain and the Magrheb. As they do not recognise the typical dhimmi status of Jews and Christians, they often force them to choose between conversion and death. They also reintroduce the shikla and force the converted Jews to also wear differentiating clothing as they do not trust their sincerity. Maimonides leaves Cordoba around 1160.

1176
Maimonides completed his Introduction to the Mishneh Torah.

1187
Upon the capture of Jerusalem, Saladin summons the Jews and permits them to resettle in the city. In particular, the residents of Ashkelon, a large Jewish settlement, respond to his request.

1189
Jacob of Orléans slain in antisemitic riots that swept through London during the coronation of King Richard I. The king later punished the perpetrators of the crime.

1190
150 Jews of York, England, killed in a pogrom, known as the York Massacre.

=== 13th century ===
1240
Jews living in England, under King Henry III, were blamed for counterfeiting the money and when the local citizens began to exact revenge on them, the king expelled his Jewish subjects in order to save them from harm.

1249–1250
The Hafsid caliph in the Magrheb and the Ayyubid sultan of Egypt issue decrees that Jews and Christians to wear a dinstinguishing badge. The so-called shikla continues to be in use for Tunisian Jews into the nineteenth century.

1250–1300
The life of Moses de Leon, of Spain. He publishes to the public the Zohar the 2nd century CE esoteric interpretations of the Torah by Rabbi Shimon bar Yochai and his disciples. Thus begins the evolution of modern Kabbalah (esoteric Jewish mysticism).

1250–1550
Period of the Rishonim, the medieval rabbinic sages. Most Jews at this time lived in lands bordering the Mediterranean Sea or in Western Europe under feudal systems. With the decline of Muslim and Jewish centers of power in Iraq, there was no single place in the world which was a recognized authority for deciding matters of Jewish law and practice. Consequently, the rabbis recognized the need for writing commentaries on the Torah and Talmud and for writing law codes that would allow Jews anywhere in the world to be able to continue living in the Jewish tradition.

1267
Nachmanides (Ramban) settles in Jerusalem and builds the Ramban Synagogue.

1270–1343
Rabbi Jacob ben Asher of Spain writes the Arba'ah Turim (Four Rows of Jewish Law).

1276
Massacre in Fez to kill all Jews stopped by intervention of the Emir.

1290
Jews are expelled from England by Edward I after the banning of usury in the 1275 Statute of Jewry.

=== 14th century ===
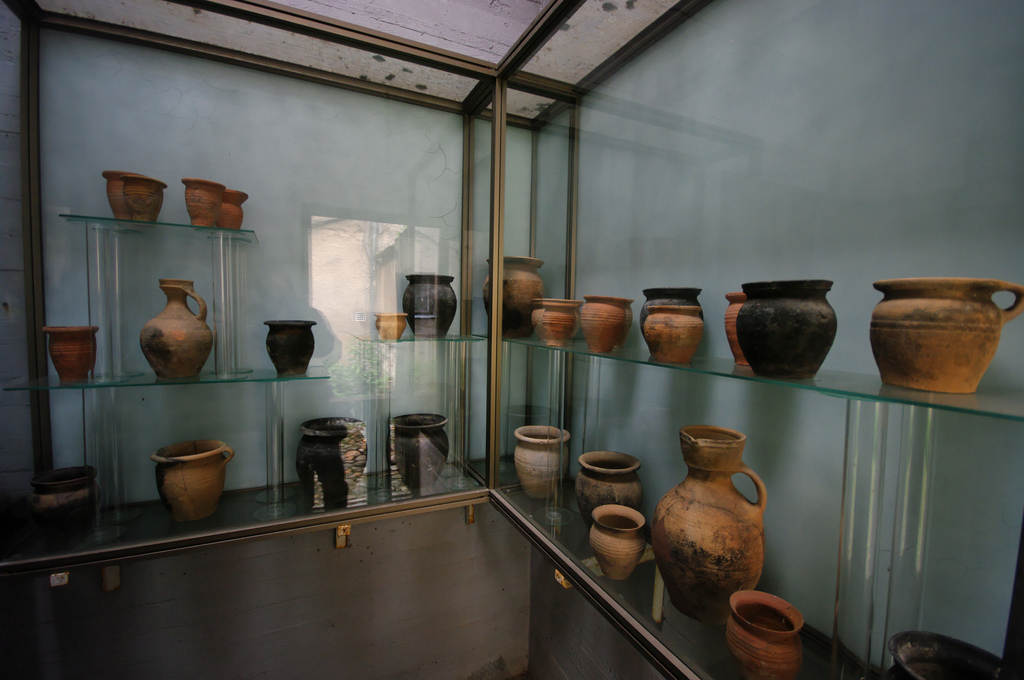
Pottery in the museum of the synagogue of Sopron, Hungary, built around 1300.

1300
Rabbi Levi ben Gershom, aka Gersonides. A 14th-century French Jewish philosopher best known for his Sefer Milhamot Adonai ("The Book of the Wars of the Lord") as well as for his philosophical commentaries.

1304–1394
Jews are repeatedly expelled from France and readmitted, for a price.

1343
Jews persecuted in Western Europe are invited to Poland by Casimir the Great.

1346–1353
Jews scapegoated as the cause of the growing Black Death. See also Medieval antisemitism.

1348
Pope Clement VI issued two papal bulls in 1348 (6 July and 26 September), the latter named Quamvis Perfidiam, which condemned the violence and said those who blamed the plague on the Jews had been "seduced by that liar, the Devil." He urged clergy to take action to protect Jews as he had done.

1349
Several hundred Jews are publicly burned to death in the Strasbourg massacre.

1350s
Genetic testing conducted on Ashkenazi Jews has pointed to a bottleneck in the 1300s in the Ashkenazi Jewish population where it dwindled down to as few as 250–420 people.

1369–70
Civil war in Spain, between brothers Peter of Castile (Pedro) and Henry II of Castile (Enrique), leads to the deaths of 38,000 Jews, embroiled in the conflict.

=== 15th century ===
1428
The Marinid sultan confines the Jewish population to the mellah of Fez due to the increasing hostility of the Muslim population. The mellahs of other towns of Morocco, all of which are established later under the Saadians and the Alawids, are founded with the express intent of ostracism and isolating Jews rather than protection.

1465
During the 1465 Moroccan revolution which overthrows the Marinid dynasty, the Jewish mellah is attacked by the population of Fez, though the extent of the massacre is debated.

1478
King Ferdinand and Queen Isabella of Spain institute the Spanish Inquisition.

1486
First Jewish prayer book published in Italy.

1488–1575
Rabbi Yosef Karo spends 20 years compiling the Beit Yosef, an enormous guide to Jewish law. He then writes a more concise guide, the Shulkhan Arukh, that becomes the standard law guide for the next 400 years. Born in Spain, Yosef Karo lives and dies in Safed.

1488
Obadiah ben Abraham, commentator on the Mishnah, arrives in Jerusalem and marks a new epoch for the Jewish community.

1492
The Alhambra Decree: Approximately 200,000 Jews are expelled from Spain, The expelled Jews relocate to the Netherlands, Turkey, Arab lands, and Judea; some eventually go to South and Central America. However, most emigrate to Poland. In later centuries, more than 50% of Jewish world population lived in Poland. Many Jews remain in Spain after publicly converting to Christianity, becoming Crypto-Jews.

1492
Bayezid II of the Ottoman Empire issued a formal invitation to the Jews expelled from Spain and Portugal and sent out ships to safely bring Jews to his empire.

1493
Jews expelled from Sicily. As many as 137,000 exiled.

1496
Jews expelled from Portugal and from many German cities.

== Early Modern Era ==
=== 16th century ===
1501
King Alexander of Poland readmits Jews to Grand Duchy of Lithuania.

1506
Lisbon massacre: Dominican friars promised absolution for sins committed over the previous 100 days to those who killed the Jews of Lisbon, and a crowd of more than 500 people (many of them sailors from the counties of Holland and Zeeland, and the Kingdom of Germany) gathered, persecuted, tortured, killed, and burnt at the stake hundreds of Jews. Women and children were beaten to death. Some Portuguese families saved their jewish neighbors by hiding them.

1511
Printing of Jewish books by mechanical press began by Daniel Bomberg.

1516
Venetian Ghetto established, the first Jewish ghetto in Europe. Many others follow.

1525–1572
Rabbi Moshe Isserles (The Rema) of Kraków writes an extensive commentary to the Shulkhan Arukh called the Mappah, extending its application to Ashkenazi Jewry.

1534
King Sigismund I of Poland abolishes the law that required Jews to wear special clothes.

1534
First Yiddish book published, in Poland.

1534–1572
Isaac Luria ("the Arizal") teaches Kabbalah in Jerusalem and (mainly) Safed to select disciples. Some of those, such as Ibn Tebul, Israel Sarug and mostly Chaim Vital, put his teachings into writing. While the Sarugian versions are published shortly afterwards in Italy and Holland, the Vitalian texts remain in manuscripti for as long as three centuries.

1547
First Hebrew Jewish printing house in Lublin.

1550
Jews expelled from Genoa, Italy.

1550
Moses ben Jacob Cordovero founds a Kabbalah academy in Safed.

1567
First yeshiva is founded in Poland.

1577
A Hebrew printing press is established in Safed, the first press in Palestine and the first in Asia.

1580–1764
First session of the Council of Four Lands (Va'ad Arba' Aratzot) in Lublin, Poland. 70 delegates from local Jewish kehillot meet to discuss taxation and other issues important to the Jewish community.

=== 17th century ===
1621–1630
Shelah HaKadosh writes his most famous work after emigrating to the Land of Israel.

1623
First time separate (Va'ad) Jewish Sejm for Grand Duchy of Lithuania.

1626–1676
False Messiah Sabbatai Zevi.

1627
Kingdom of Beta Israel in what is now modern day Ethiopia collapses and loses autonomy.

1633
Jews of Poznań granted a privilege of forbidding Christians to enter into their city.

1648
Jewish population of Poland reached 450,000 (4% of the 11,000,000 population of Polish–Lithuanian Commonwealth being Jewish), 40,000 in Bohemia, and 25,000 in Moravia. Worldwide population of Jewry is estimated at 750,000.

1648–1655
The Ukrainian Cossack Bohdan Chmielnicki leads a massacre of Polish gentry and Jewry that leaves an estimated 65,000 Jews dead and a similar number of gentry. The total decrease in the number of Jews is estimated at 100,000.

1655
Jews readmitted to England by Oliver Cromwell.

1660
1660 destruction of Safed.

1679
Jews of Yemen expelled to Mawza

=== 18th century ===
1700–1760
Israel ben Eliezer, known as the Baal Shem Tov, founds Hasidic Judaism, a way to approach God through meditation and fervent joy. He and his disciples attract many followers, and establish numerous Hasidic sects. The European Jewish opponents of Hasidim (known as Misnagdim) argue that one should follow a more scholarly approach to Judaism. Some of the more well-known Hasidic sects today include Bobover, Breslover, Gerer, Lubavitch (Chabad) and Satmar Hasidim.

1700
Rabbi Judah HeHasid makes aliyah to Palestine accompanied by hundreds of his followers. A few days after his arrival, Rabbi Yehuda dies suddenly.

1700
Sir Solomon de Medina is knighted by William III, making him the first Jew in England to receive that honour.

1720
Unpaid Arab creditors burn the synagogue unfinished by immigrants of Rabbi Yehuda and expel all Ashkenazi Jews from Jerusalem. See also Hurva Synagogue

1720–1797
Rabbi Elijah of Vilna, the Vilna Gaon.

1729–1786
Moses Mendelssohn and the Haskalah (Enlightenment) movement. He strove to bring an end to the isolation of the Jews so that they would be able to embrace the culture of the Western world, and in turn be embraced by gentiles as equals. The Haskalah opened the door for the development of all the modern Jewish denominations and the revival of Hebrew as a spoken language, but it also paved the way for many who, wishing to be fully accepted into Christian society, converted to Christianity or chose to assimilate to emulate it.

1740
Parliament of Great Britain passes a general act permitting Jews to be naturalized in the American colonies. Previously, several colonies had also permitted Jews to be naturalized without taking the standard oath "upon the true faith of a Christian."

1740
Ottoman authorities invite Rabbi Haim Abulafia (1660–1744), renowned Kabbalist and Rabbi of Izmir, to come to the Holy Land. Rabbi Abulafia is to rebuild the city of Tiberias, which has lain desolate for some 70 years. The city's revival is seen by many as a sign of the coming of the Messiah.

1740–1750
Thousands immigrate to Palestine under the influence of Messianic predictions. The large immigration greatly increases the size and strength of the Jewish Settlement in Palestine.

1747
Rabbi Abraham Gershon of Kitov (Kuty) (1701–1761) is the first immigrant of the Hasidic Aliyah. He is a respected Talmudic scholar, mystic, and brother-in-law of Rabbi Israel Baal Shem Tov (founder of the Hasidic movement). Rabbi Abraham first settles in Hebron. Later, he relocates to Jerusalem at the behest of its residents.

1759
Followers of Jacob Frank joined ranks of Polish szlachta (gentry) of Jewish origins.

1772–1795
Partitions of Poland between Russia, Kingdom of Prussia and Austria. Main bulk of World Jewry lives now in those 3 countries. Old privileges of Jewish communities are denounced.

1775–1781
American Revolution; guaranteed the freedom of religion.

1775
Mob violence against the Jews of Hebron.

1789
The French Revolution. In 1791 France grants full right to Jews and allows them to become citizens, under certain conditions.

1790
In the US, President George Washington sends a letter to the Jewish community in Rhode Island. He writes that he envisions a country "which gives bigotry no sanction...persecution no assistance". Despite the fact that the US was a predominantly Protestant country, theoretically Jews are given full rights. In addition, the mentality of Jewish immigrants shaped by their role as merchants in Eastern Europe meant they were well-prepared to compete in American society.

1791
Russia creates the Pale of Settlement that includes land acquired from Poland with a huge Jewish population and in the same year Crimea. The Jewish population of the Pale was 750,000. 450,000 Jews lived in the Prussian and Austrian parts of Poland.

1798
Rabbi Nachman of Breslov travels to Palestine.

1799
While French troops were in Palestine besieging the city of Acre, Napoleon prepared a Proclamation requesting Asian and African Jews to help him conquer Jerusalem, but his unsuccessful attempt to capture Acre prevented it from being issued.

1799
Mob violence on Jews in Safed.

== 19th century ==
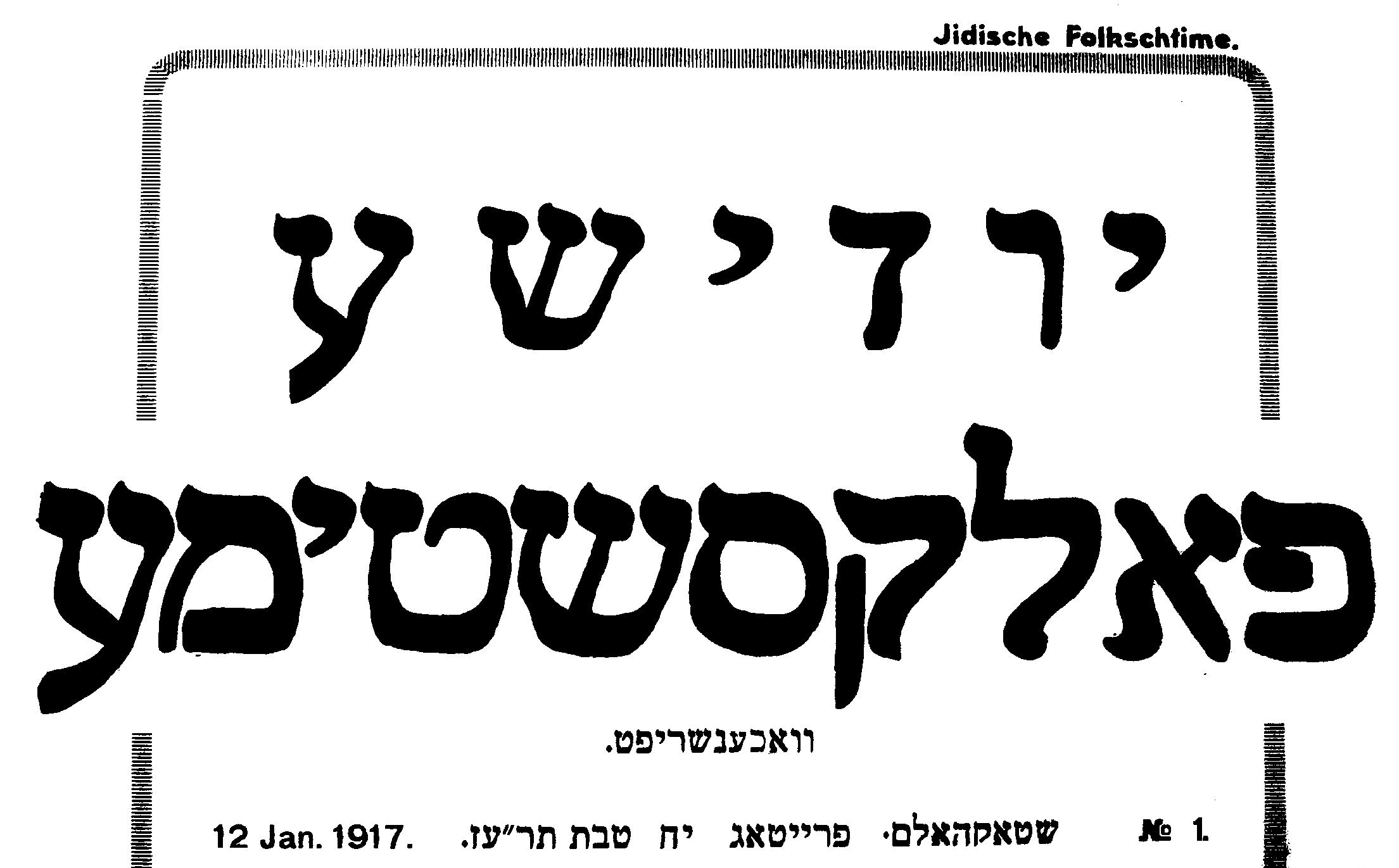
Banner from the first issue of the Jidische Folkschtime (Yiddish People's Voice), published in Stockholm, 12 January 1917.

1800–1900
The Golden Age of Yiddish literature, the revival of Hebrew as a spoken language, and the revival of Hebrew literature.

1808–1840
Large-scale aliyah in hope of Hastening Redemption in anticipation of the arrival of the Messiah in 1840.

1820–1860
The development of Orthodox Judaism, a set of traditionalist movements that resisted the influences of modernization that arose in response to the European emancipation and Enlightenment movements; characterized by continued strict adherence to Halakha.

1830
Greece grants citizenship to Jews.

1831
Jewish militias take part in the defense of Warsaw against Russians.

1834–1835
Muslims, Druze attack Jews in Safed, Hebron & in Jerusalem. (See related: Safed plunder).

1837
Moses Haim Montefiore is knighted by Queen Victoria

1837
Galilee earthquake of 1837 devastates Jewish communities of Safed and Tiberias.

1838–1933
Rabbi Yisroel Meir ha-Kohen (Chofetz Chaim) opens an important yeshiva. He writes an authoritative Halakhic work, Mishnah Berurah.

Mid-19th century
Beginning of the rise of classical Reform Judaism.

Mid-19th century
Rabbi Israel Salanter develops the Mussar Movement. While teaching that Jewish law is binding, he dismisses current philosophical debate and advocates the ethical teachings as the essence of Judaism.

Mid-19th century
Positive-Historical Judaism, later known as Conservative Judaism, is developed.

1841
David Levy Yulee of Florida is elected to the United States Senate, becoming the first Jew elected to Congress.

1851
Norway allows Jews to enter the country. They are not emancipated until 1891.

1858
Jews emancipated in England.

1860
Alliance Israelite Universelle, an international Jewish organization is founded in Paris with the goal to protect Jewish rights as citizens.

1860–1875
Moshe Montefiori builds Jewish neighbourhoods outside the Old City of Jerusalem starting with Mishkenot Sha'ananim.

1860–1864
Jews are taking part in Polish national movement, that was followed by January rising.

1860–1943
Henrietta Szold: educator, author, social worker and founder of Hadassah Women's Zionist Organization of America.

1861
The Zion Society is formed in Frankfurt am Main, Germany.

1862
Jews are given equal rights in Russian-controlled Congress Poland. The privileges of some towns regarding prohibition of Jewish settlement are revoked. In Leipzig, Moses Hess publishes the book Rome and Jerusalem, the first book to call for the establishment of a Jewish socialist commonwealth in Palestine. The book is also notable for giving the impetus for the Labor Zionist movement.

1867
Jews emancipated in Hungary.

1868
Benjamin Disraeli becomes Prime Minister of the United Kingdom. Though converted to Christianity as a child, he is the first person of Jewish descent to become a leader of government in Europe.

1870–1890
Russian Zionist group Hovevei Zion (Lovers of Zion) and Bilu (est. 1882) set up a series of Jewish settlements in the Land of Israel, financially aided by Baron Edmond James de Rothschild. In Rishon LeZion Eliezer ben Yehuda revives Hebrew as spoken modern language.

1870
Jews emancipated in Italy.

1871
Jews emancipated in Germany.

1875
Reform Judaism's Hebrew Union College is founded in Cincinnati. Its founder was Rabbi Isaac Mayer Wise, the architect of American Reform Judaism.

1877
New Hampshire becomes the last state to give Jews equal political rights.

1878
Petah Tikva is founded by religious pioneers from Jerusalem, led by Yehoshua Stampfer.

1880
World Jewish population around 7.7 million, 90% in Europe, mostly Eastern Europe; around 3.5 million in the former Polish provinces.

1881–1884, 1903–1906, 1918–1920
Three major waves of pogroms kill tens of thousands of Jews in Russia and Ukraine. More than two million Russian Jews emigrate in the period 1881–1920.

1881
On December 30–31, the First Congress of all Zionist Unions for the colonization of Palestine was held at Focșani, Romania.

1882–1903
The First Aliyah, a major wave of Jewish immigrants to build a homeland in Palestine.

1886
Rabbi Sabato Morais and Alexander Kohut begin to champion the Conservative Jewish reaction to American Reform, and establish The Jewish Theological Seminary of America as a school of 'enlightened Orthodoxy'.

1890
The term "Zionism" is coined by an Austrian Jewish publicist Nathan Birnbaum in his journal Self Emancipation and was defined as the national movement for the return of the Jewish people to their homeland and the resumption of Jewish sovereignty in the Land of Israel.

1895
First published book by Sigmund Freud.

1897
In response to the Dreyfus affair, Theodor Herzl writes Der Judenstaat (The Jewish State), advocating the creation of a free and independent Jewish state in Israel.

1897
The Bund (General Jewish Labour Bund) is formed in Russia.

1897
First Russian Empire Census: 5,200,000 of Jews, 4,900,000 in the Pale. The lands of former Poland have 1,300,000 Jews or 14% of population.

1897
The First Zionist Congress was held at Basel, which brought the World Zionist Organization (WZO) into being.

== 20th century ==
1902
Rabbi Dr. Solomon Schechter reorganizes the Jewish Theological Seminary of America and makes it into the flagship institution of Conservative Judaism.

1903
St. Petersburg's Znamya newspaper publishes a literary hoax The Protocols of the Elders of Zion. Kishinev Pogrom caused by accusations that Jews practice cannibalism.

1905
1905 Russian Revolution accompanied by pogroms.

1912-1914
S. An-sky's Jewish Ethnographic Expedition to the Pale of Settlement visited around 70 shtetls in Volyn, Podolia, and Galicia to collect folklore and artifacts, record music, and take photos of vanishing Ashkenazi culture

1915
Yeshiva College (later University) and its Rabbi Isaac Elchanan Rabbinical Seminary is established in New York City for training in a Modern Orthodox milieu.

1916
Louis Brandeis, on the first of June, is confirmed as the United States' first Jewish Supreme Court justice. Brandeis was nominated by American President Woodrow Wilson.

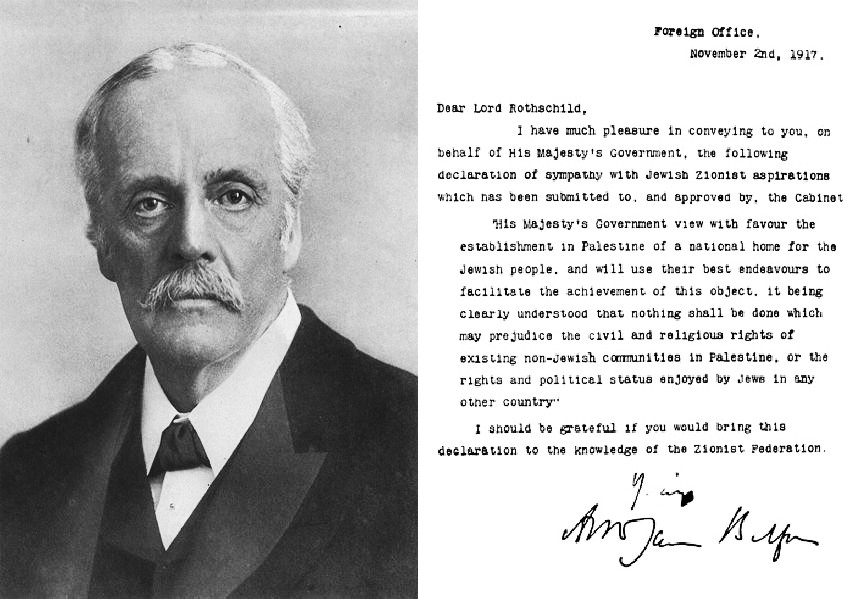
The Balfour Declaration which supported the establishment of a Jewish homeland in Palestine and protected the civil and religious rights of existing non-Jewish communities.

1917
The British defeat the Turks and gain control of Palestine. The British issue the Balfour Declaration which gives official British support for "the establishment in Palestine of a national home for the Jewish people ... it being clearly understood that nothing shall be done which may prejudice the civil and religious rights of existing non-Jewish communities in Palestine". Many Jews interpret this to mean that all of Palestine was to become a Jewish state.

1917 February
The Pale of Settlement is abolished, and Jews get equal rights. The Russian Civil War leads to over 2,000 pogroms with tens of thousands murdered and hundreds of thousand made homeless.

1918–1939
The period between the two World Wars is often referred to as the "golden age" of hazzanut (cantors). Some of the great Jewish cantors of this era include Abraham Davis, Moshe Koussevitzky, Zavel Kwartin (1874–1953), Jan Peerce, Josef "Yossele" Rosenblatt (1882–1933), Gershon Sirota (1874–1943), and Laibale Waldman.

1919
February 15: Over 1,200 Jews killed in Khmelnitsky pogrom.
March 25: Around 4,000 Jews killed by Cossack troops in Tetiev.
June 17: 800 Jews decapitated in assembly-line fashion in Dubova.

1920
At the San Remo conference Britain receives the League of Nations' British Mandate of Palestine.
April 4–7: Five Jews killed and 216 wounded in the Jerusalem riots

1920s–present
A variety of Jewish authors, including Gertrude Stein, Allen Ginsberg, Saul Bellow, Adrienne Rich and Philip Roth, sometimes drawing on Jewish culture and history, flourish and become highly influential on the Anglophone literary scene.

1921
British military administration of the Mandate is replaced by civilian rule.

1921
Britain proclaims that all of Palestine east of the Jordan River is forever closed to Jewish settlement, but not to Arab settlement.

1921
Polish–Soviet peace treaty in Riga. Citizens of both sides are given rights to choose the country. Hundred thousands of Jews, especially small businesses forbidden in the Soviets, move to Poland.

June 15, 1921
The Central Yiddish School Organization, (Tsentrale Yidishe Shul-Organizatsye or CYSHO), was established in Warsaw to create a modern Yiddish educational system.

1922
Reform Rabbi Stephen S. Wise established the Jewish Institute of Religion in New York. (It merged with Hebrew Union College in 1950.)

1923
Britain gives the Golan Heights to the French Mandate of Syria. Arab immigration is allowed; Jewish immigration is not.

The First World Congress of Jewish Women is held 6–11 May in Vienna.

1924
2,989,000 Jews according to religion poll in Poland (10.5% of total). Jewish youth consisted 23% of students of high schools and 26% of students of universities.

1926
Prior to World War I, there were few Hasidic yeshivas in Europe. On Lag BaOmer 1926, Rabbi Shlomo Chanoch Hacohen Rabinowicz, the fourth Radomsker Rebbe, declared, "The time has come to found yeshivas where the younger generation will be able to learn and toil in Torah", leading to the founding of the Keser Torah network of 36 yeshivas in pre-war Poland.

1929
A long-running dispute between Muslims and Jews over access to the Western Wall in Jerusalem escalates into the 1929 Palestine riots. The riots included attacks by Arabs on Jews, resulting in massacres in Hebron and Safed, and violence against Jews in Jerusalem.

1930
World Jewry: 15,000,000. Main countries USA (4,000,000), Poland (3,500,000 11% of total), Soviet Union (2,700,000 2% of total), Romania (1,000,000 6% of total). Palestine 175,000 or 17% of total 1,036,000.

1933
Hitler takes over Germany; his anti-Semitic sentiments are well-known, prompting numerous Jews to emigrate.

1935
Regina Jonas became the first woman to be ordained as a rabbi.

1937
Adin Steinsaltz born, author of the first comprehensive Babylonian Talmud commentary since Rashi in the 11th century.

1939
The British government issues the 'White Paper'. The paper proposed a limit of 10,000 Jewish immigrants for each year between 1940 and 1944, plus 25,000 refugees for any emergency arising during that period.

1938–1945
The Holocaust (Ha Shoah), resulting in the methodical extermination of nearly 6 million Jews across Europe.

1940s–present
Various Jewish filmmakers, including Billy Wilder, Woody Allen, Mel Brooks and the Coen Brothers, frequently draw on Jewish philosophy and humor, and become some of the most artistically and popularly successful in the history of the medium.

1941
The Muslim residents of Baghdad carried out a savage pogrom against their Jewish compatriots. In this pogrom, known by its Arabic name al-Farhud, about 200 Jews were murdered and thousands wounded, on June 1–2. Jewish property was plundered and many homes set ablaze.

1941
The Lubavitcher Rebbe, Rabbi Menachem Schneerson, arrives in New York after escaping Nazi Europe. Along with his father-in-law, the previous Rebbe, he builds one of the largest worldwide movements (Chabad-Lubavitch) aimed at inspiring Jews to return to their heritage and Torah observance.

1945–1948
Post-Holocaust refugee crisis. British attempts to detain Jews attempting to enter Palestine illegally.

1946–1948
The violent struggle for the creation of a Jewish state in the British mandate of Palestine is intensified by Jewish defense groups: Haganah, Irgun, and Lehi (group).

November 29, 1947
The United Nations approves the creation of a Jewish State and an Arab State in the British mandate of Palestine.

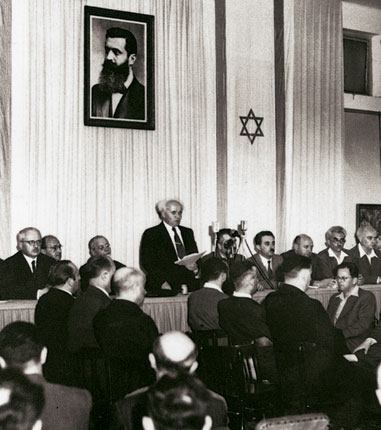
David Ben-Gurion proclaiming Israeli independence on May 14, 1948, below a portrait of Theodor Herzl

May 14, 1948
The State of Israel declares itself as an independent Jewish state hours before the British Mandate is due to expire. Within eleven minutes, it is de facto recognized by the United States. Andrei Gromyko, the Soviet Union's UN ambassador, calls for the United Nations to accept Israel as a member state. The UN approves.

May 15, 1948
1948 Arab–Israeli War: Syria, Iraq, Transjordan, Lebanon and Egypt invade Israel hours after its creation. The attack is repulsed, and Israel conquers more territory. A Jewish exodus from Arab and Muslim lands results, as up to a million Jews flee or are expelled from Arab and Muslim nations. Most settle in Israel. See also 1949 Armistice Agreements.

1948–1949
Almost 250,000 Holocaust survivors make their way to Israel. "Operation Magic Carpet" brings thousands of Yemenite Jews to Israel.

1956
The 1956 Suez War Egypt blockades the Gulf of Aqaba, and closes the Suez canal to Israeli shipping. Egypt's President Gamal Abdel Nasser calls for the destruction of Israel. Israel, England, and France go to war and force Egypt to end the blockade of Aqaba, and open the canal to all nations.

1965
The declaration Nostra aetate, issued by the Second Vatican Council, marks a decisive turning point in the relationship between the Roman Catholic Church and the Jewish people.

1965
Los Angeles Dodgers pitcher Sandy Koufax refuses to pitch Game 1 of the 1965 World Series because it fell on Yom Kippur.

1966
Shmuel Yosef Agnon (1888–1970) becomes the first Hebrew writer to win the Nobel Prize in literature.

May 16, 1967
Egyptian President Nasser demands that the UN dismantle the UN Emergency Force I (UNEF I) between Israel and Egypt. The UN complies and the last UN peacekeeper is out of Sinai and Gaza by May 19.

1967 May
Egyptian President Gamal Abdel Nasser closes the strategic Straits of Tiran to Israeli shipping. Egyptian troops replace the United Nations in the Sinai Peninsula.

June 5–10, 1967
The Six-Day War. Israel launches a pre-emptive strike against Egypt, Jordan, and Syria. Israeli aircraft destroy the bulk of the Arab air forces on the ground in a surprise attack, followed by Israeli ground offensives which see Israel decisively defeat the Arab forces and capture the Sinai Peninsula, the West Bank, and the Golan Heights.

September 1, 1967
The Arab Leaders meet in Khartoum, Sudan. The Three No's of Khartoum: No recognition of Israel. No negotiations with Israel. No peace with Israel.

1968
Rabbi Mordechai Kaplan formally creates a separate Reconstructionist Judaism movement by setting up the Reconstructionist Rabbinical College in Philadelphia.

1969
First group of African Hebrew Israelites begin to migrate to Israel under the leadership of Ben Ammi Ben Israel.

Mid-1970s to present
Growing revival of Klezmer music (The folk music of European Jews).,

1972
Sally Priesand became the first female rabbi ordained in the US, and is believed to be only the second woman ever to be formally ordained in the history of Judaism.

1972
Mark Spitz sets the record for most gold medals won in a single Olympic Games (seven) in the 1972 Summer Olympics. The Munich massacre occurs when Israeli athletes are taken hostage by Black September terrorists. The hostages are killed during a failed rescue attempt.

October 6–24, 1973
The Yom Kippur War. Egypt and Syria, backed up by expeditionary forces from other Arab nations, launch a surprise attack against Israel on Yom Kippur. After absorbing the initial attacks, Israel recaptures lost ground and then pushes into Egypt and Syria. Subsequently, OPEC reduces oil production, driving up oil prices and triggering a global economic crisis.

1975
President Gerald Ford signs legislation including the Jackson–Vanik amendment, which ties US trade benefits to the Soviet Union to freedom of emigration for Jews.

1975
United Nations adopts resolution equating Zionism with racism. Rescinded in 1991.

1976
Israel rescues hostages taken to Entebbe, Uganda.

September 18, 1978
At Camp David, near Washington D.C., Israel and Egypt sign a comprehensive peace treaty, The Camp David Accord, which included the withdrawal of Israel from the Sinai.

1978
Yiddish writer Isaac Bashevis Singer receives Nobel Prize

1979
Prime Minister Menachem Begin and President Anwar Sadat are awarded Nobel Peace Prize.

1979–1983
Operation Elijah: Rescue of Ethiopian Jewry.

1982 June–December
The Lebanon War. Israel invades Southern Lebanon to drive out the PLO.

1983
American Reform Jews formally accept patrilineal descent, creating a new definition of who is a Jew.

1984–1985
Operations Moses, Joshua: Rescue of Ethiopian Jewry by Israel.

1986
Elie Wiesel wins the Nobel Peace Prize

1986
Nathan Sharansky, Soviet Jewish dissident, is freed from prison.

1987
Beginning of the First Intifada against Israel.

1989
Fall of the Berlin Wall between East and West Germany, collapse of the communist East German government, and the beginning of Germany's reunification (which formally began in October 1990).

1990
The Soviet Union opens its borders for the three million Soviet Jews who had been held as virtual prisoners within their own country. Hundreds of thousands of Soviet Jews choose to leave the Soviet Union and move to Israel.

1990–1991
Iraq invades Kuwait, triggering a war between Iraq and Allied United Nations forces. Israel is hit by 39 Scud missiles from Iraq.

1991
Operation Solomon: Rescue of the remainder of Ethiopian Jewry in a twenty-four-hour airlift.

October 30, 1991
The Madrid Peace Conference opens in Spain, sponsored by the United States and the Soviet Union.

April 22, 1993
The United States Holocaust Memorial Museum dedicated.

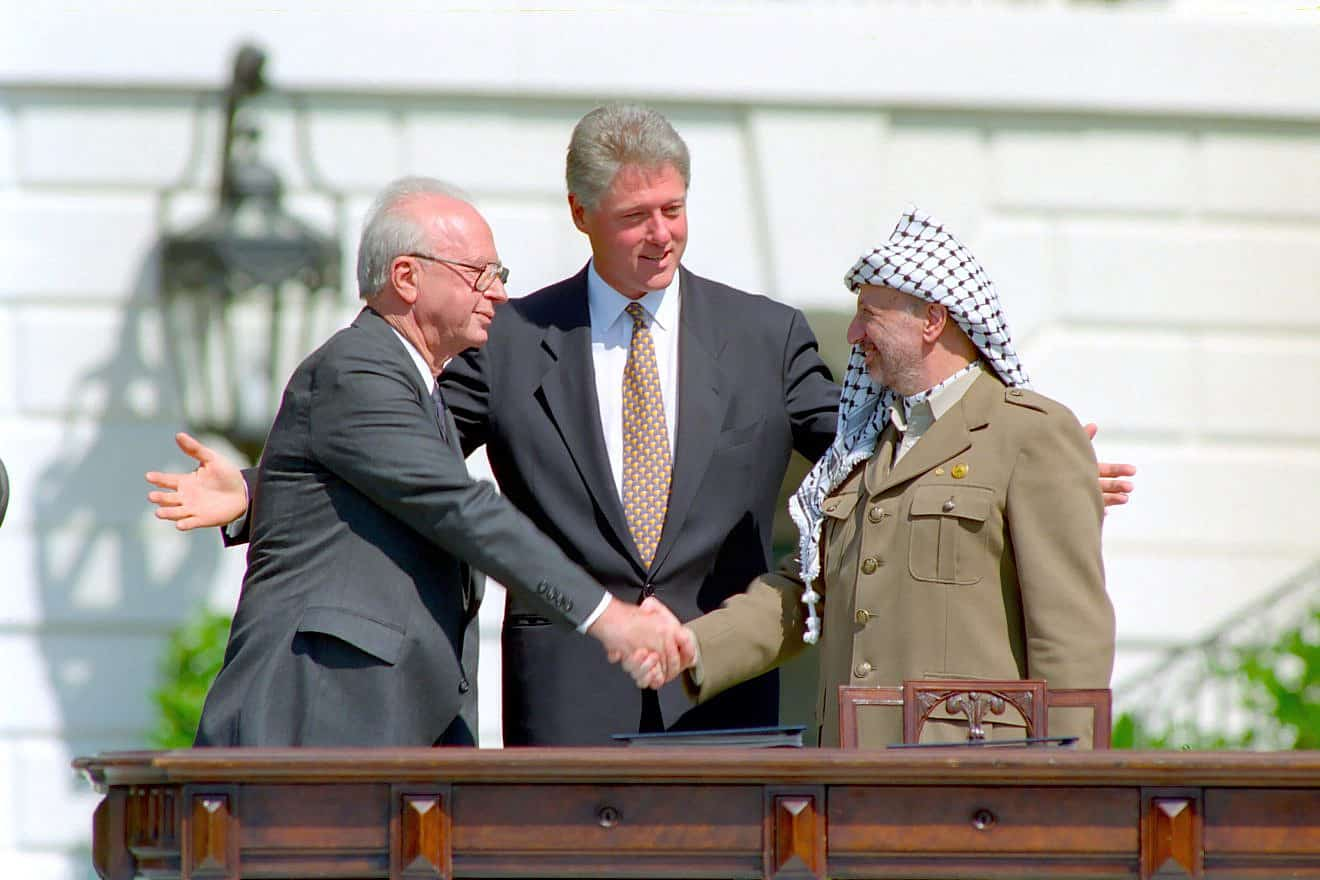
Yitzhak Rabin and Yasser Arafat shake hands at the signing of the Oslo Accords, with Bill Clinton behind them, 1993

September 13, 1993
Israel and PLO sign the Oslo Accords.

1994
The Lubavitcher (Chabad) Rebbe, Menachem Mendel Schneerson, dies.

October 26, 1994
Israel and Jordan sign an official peace treaty. Israel cedes a small amount of contested land to Jordan, and the countries open official diplomatic relations, with open borders and free trade.

December 10, 1994
Arafat, Rabin and Israeli Foreign Minister Shimon Peres share the Nobel Peace Prize.

November 4, 1995
Israeli Prime Minister Yitzhak Rabin is assassinated.

1996
Peres loses election to Benyamin (Bibi) Netanyahu (Likud party).

1999
Ehud Barak elected Prime Minister of Israel.

== 21st century ==
May 24, 2000
Israel unilaterally withdraws its remaining forces from its security zone in southern Lebanon to the international border, fully complying with the UN Security Council Res. 425.

2000 July
Camp David Summit.

2000, Summer
Senator Joseph Lieberman becomes the first Jewish-American to be nominated for a national office (Vice President of the United States) by a major political party (the Democratic Party).

September 29, 2000
The al-AqsaButler Intifada begins.

2001
Election of Ariel Sharon as Israel's Prime Minister.

2001
Jewish Museum of Turkey is founded by Turkish Jewry

2004
Avram Hershko and Aaron Ciechanover of the Technion win the Nobel Prize in Chemistry. The Jewish Autonomous Oblast builds its first synagogue, Birobidzhan Synagogue, in accordance with halakha. Uriyahu Butler became the first member of the African Hebrew Israelite community to enlist in the Israel Defense Forces (IDF)

March 31, 2005
The Government of Israel officially recognizes the Bnei Menashe people of Northeast India as one of the Ten Lost Tribes of Israel, opening the door for thousands of people to immigrate to Israel.

2005 August
The Government of Israel withdraws its military forces and settlers from the Gaza Strip.

2005 December
Prime Minister Ariel Sharon falls into a coma; Deputy Premier Ehud Olmert takes over as Acting Prime Minister

2006 March
Ehud Olmert leads the Kadima party to victory in Israeli elections, becomes Prime Minister of Israel.

2006 July–August
A military conflict in Lebanon and northern Israel started on July 12, after a Hezbollah cross-border raid into Israel. The war ended with the passage of United Nations Security Council Resolution 1701 after 34 days of fighting. About 2,000 Lebanese and 159 Israelis were killed, and civilian infrastructure on both sides heavily damaged.

2008 December
The Israel Defense Forces (IDF) launches Operation Cast Lead (מבצע עופרת יצוקה) against Hamas in the Gaza Strip.

2009 March
Benjamin Netanyahu becomes Prime Minister of Israel (also, continues as the Chairman of the Likud Party).

2014 January
Ariel Sharon dies, after undergoing a sudden decline in health, having suffered renal failure and other complications, after spending 8 years in a deep coma due to his January 2006 stroke, on January 11, 2014.

2016 March
The Jewish Agency declares an end to immigration from Yemen, following the successful conclusion of a covert operation that brought 19 people to Israel over several days. The last 50 Yemenite Jews refuse to leave Yemen.

2017 December
The United States extends formal recognition of Jerusalem as the capital of Israel.

2019 March
The United States became the first country to recognize Israeli sovereignty over the Golan Heights territory which it held since 1967.

2020 August
Israel and the United Arab Emirates sign a treaty to normalize diplomatic relations. becoming the third arab country to do so

30 April 2021
45 people are killed in the 2021 Meron stampede during Lag BaOmer.

7 October 2023
Hamas insurgents lead attacks against israeli armed forces and civilians. leading to the death of 1,390 the reoccupation of Gaza by israeli forces.

== Years in the State of Israel ==
This is a timeline of events in the State of Israel since 1948.

- 1940s: 1948 – 1949
- 1950s: 1950 – 1951 – 1952 – 1953 – 1954 – 1955 – 1956 – 1957 – 1958 – 1959
- 1960s: 1960 – 1961 – 1962 – 1963 – 1964 – 1965 – 1966 – 1967 – 1968 – 1969
- 1970s: 1970 – 1971 – 1972 – 1973 – 1974 – 1975 – 1976 – 1977 – 1978 – 1979
- 1980s: 1980 – 1981 – 1982 – 1983 – 1984 – 1985 – 1986 – 1987 – 1988 – 1989
- 1990s: 1990 – 1991 – 1992 – 1993 – 1994 – 1995 – 1996 – 1997 – 1998 – 1999
- 2000s: 2000 – 2001 – 2002 – 2003 – 2004 – 2005 – 2006 – 2007 – 2008 – 2009
- 2010s: 2010 – 2011 – 2012 – 2013 – 2014 – 2015 – 2016 – 2017 – 2018 – 2019
- 2020s: 2020 – 2021 – 2022 – 2023 – 2024 –

== See also ==
- List of artifacts in biblical archaeology
- Timeline of antisemitism
- Timeline of Jerusalem
- Timeline of Israeli history
- Timeline of Zionism
- Traditional Jewish chronology
