= Outline of Israel =

Country in the Middle East

Coordinates: 31.625321°N 35.145264°E

The Flag of Israel

The Emblem of Israel

The location of Israel

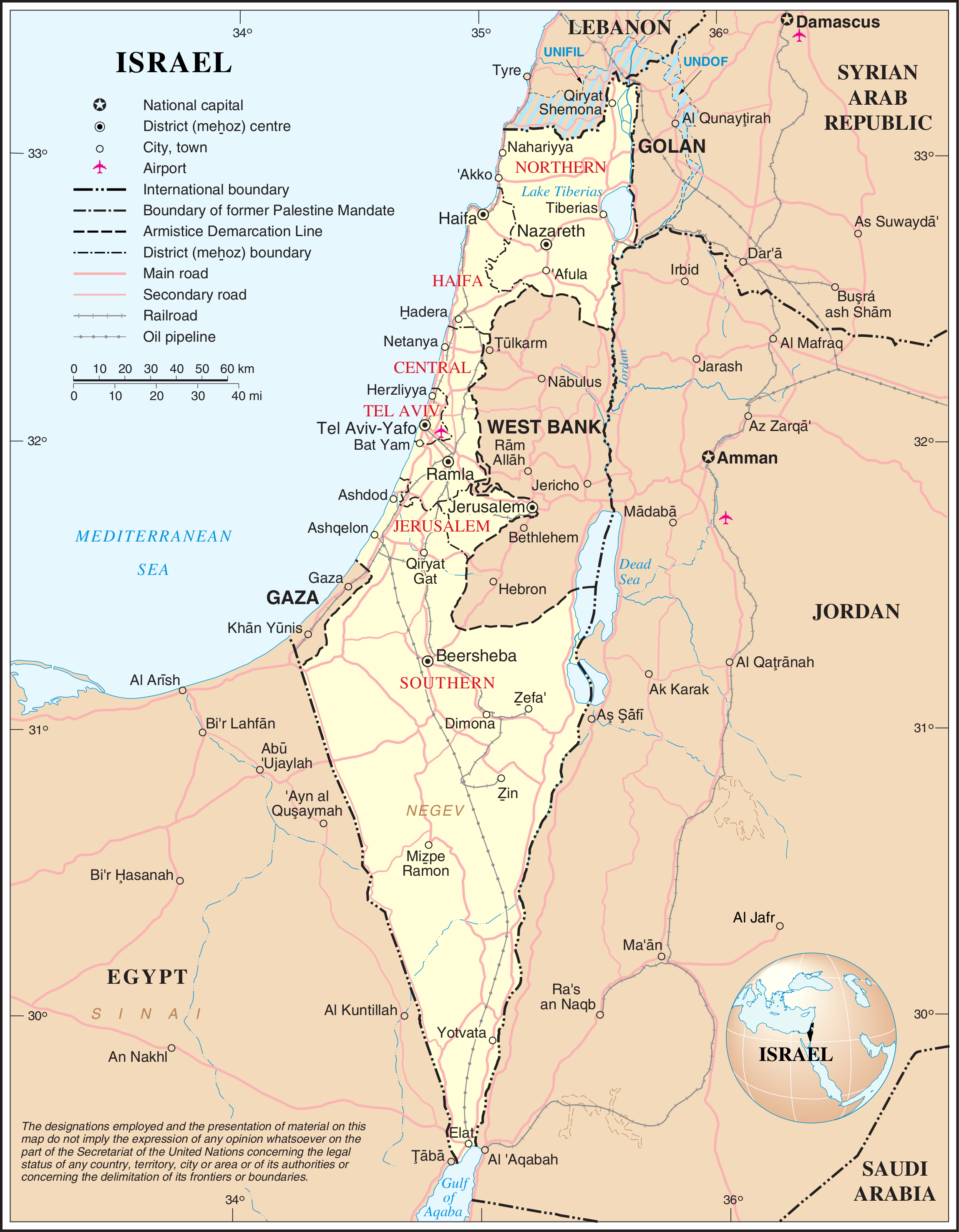
An enlargeable map of Israel

The following outline is provided as an overview of and topical guide to Israel:

Israel – country in the Middle East, on the southeastern shore of the Mediterranean Sea and the northern shore of the Red Sea. The State of Israel (Medinat Yisrael) came into existence as the homeland for the Jewish people at the termination of Mandatory British Palestine on 14 May 1948, through the Israeli Declaration of Independence. This was followed by massive migration of Jews from both Europe and the Muslim countries to Israel, and of Arabs from Israel, contributing to the extensive and still ongoing Arab–Israeli conflict. Israel's financial capital and technology center is Tel Aviv and the proclaimed capital is Jerusalem, although the state's sovereignty over the city of Jerusalem is internationally unrecognized. About 43% of the world's Jews live in Israel today, the largest Jewish community in the world.

== General reference ==
- Pronunciation: /ˈɪzreɪəl, -ri-/
- Common English country name: Israel
- Official English country name: The State of Israel
- Common endonym(s): Hebrew: יִשְׂרָאֵל (formal ˌjisräˈʔel; colloquial ˌʔisräˈel); Arabic: إسْرائيلُ (ˌʔɪsraːˈʔiːl)
- Official endonym(s): Hebrew: מְדִינַת יִשְׂרָאֵל (formal mədiˌnät jisräˈʔel; colloquial mediˌnät‿isräˈel); Arabic: دَوْلَةُ إسْرائيلَ (ˌdɑwlæt(ʊ) ʔɪsraːˈʔiːl)
- Adjectival(s): Israeli
- Etymology: Name of Israel
- International rankings of Israel
  - 151st largest country
  - 94th most populous country
- ISO country codes: IL, ISR, 376
- ISO region codes: See ISO 3166-2:IL
- Internet country code top-level domain: .il

== Geography of Israel ==
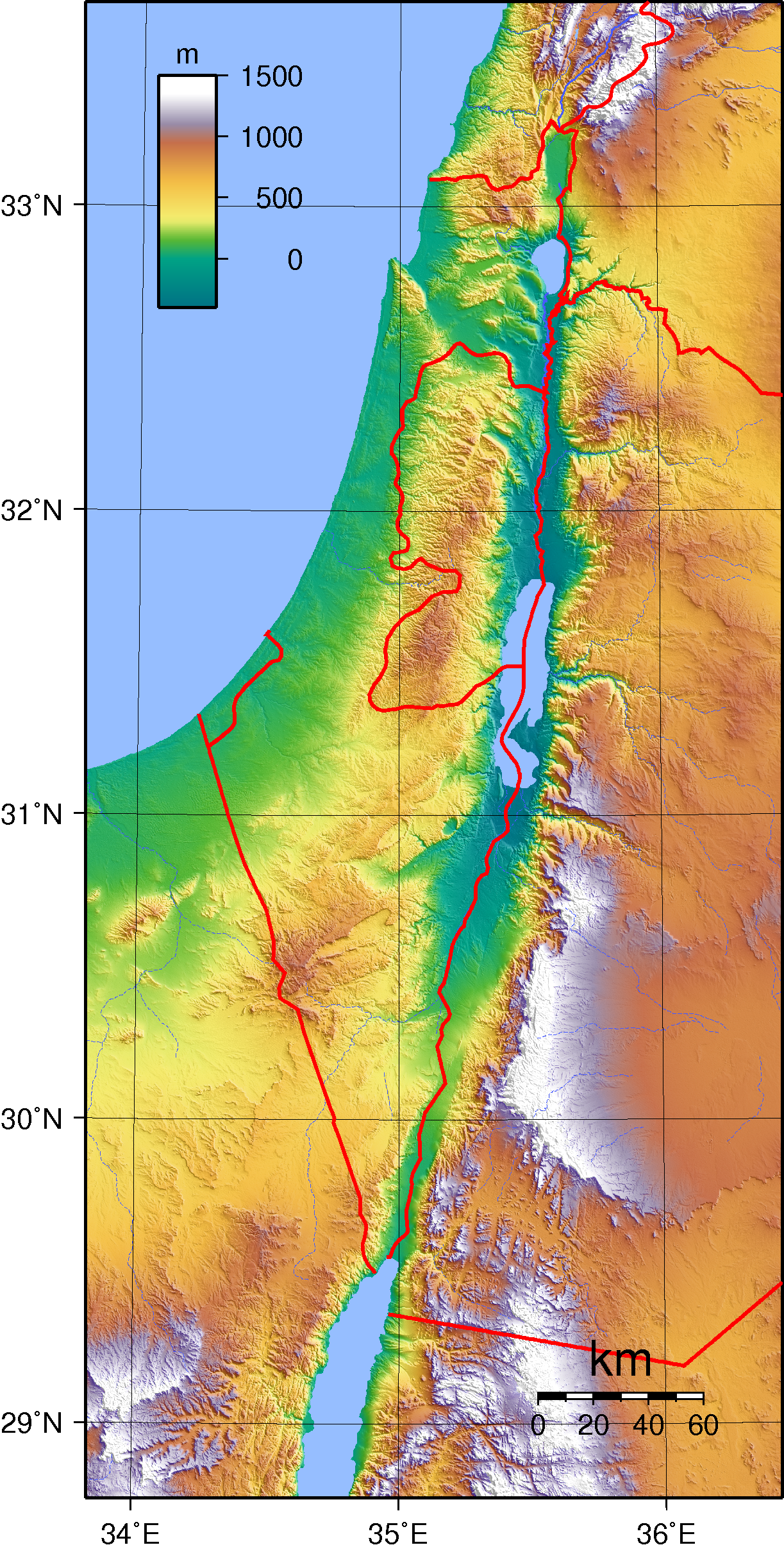
An enlargeable topographic map of Israel

Geography of Israel

- Israel is: a country
- Location:
  - Northern Hemisphere and Eastern Hemisphere
  - Eurasia
    - Asia
      - Southwest Asia
  - Middle East
    - The Levant
  - Borders of Israel
  - Extreme points of Israel
    - High: Har Meron 1,208 m (3,963 ft)
    - Low: Dead Sea −412 m (−1,352 ft) – lowest point on the surface of the Earth
  - Time zone: Israel Standard Time (UTC+02), Israel Summer Time (UTC+03)
- Population of Israel: (September 2026) Total: 10,305,000 people - 94th most populous country
  - 78%, or 7,828,000 are Jewish
  - 21.7, or 2,173,000 are Arab
  - The Israeli population grew by 124,000 between 2025 and 2026. That is a growth rate of 1.2%
- Area of Israel: 22,072 km^{2} (8,522 sq mi) (Including the Golan Heights and East Jerusalem) - 151st largest country
- Atlas of Israel

=== Environment of Israel ===
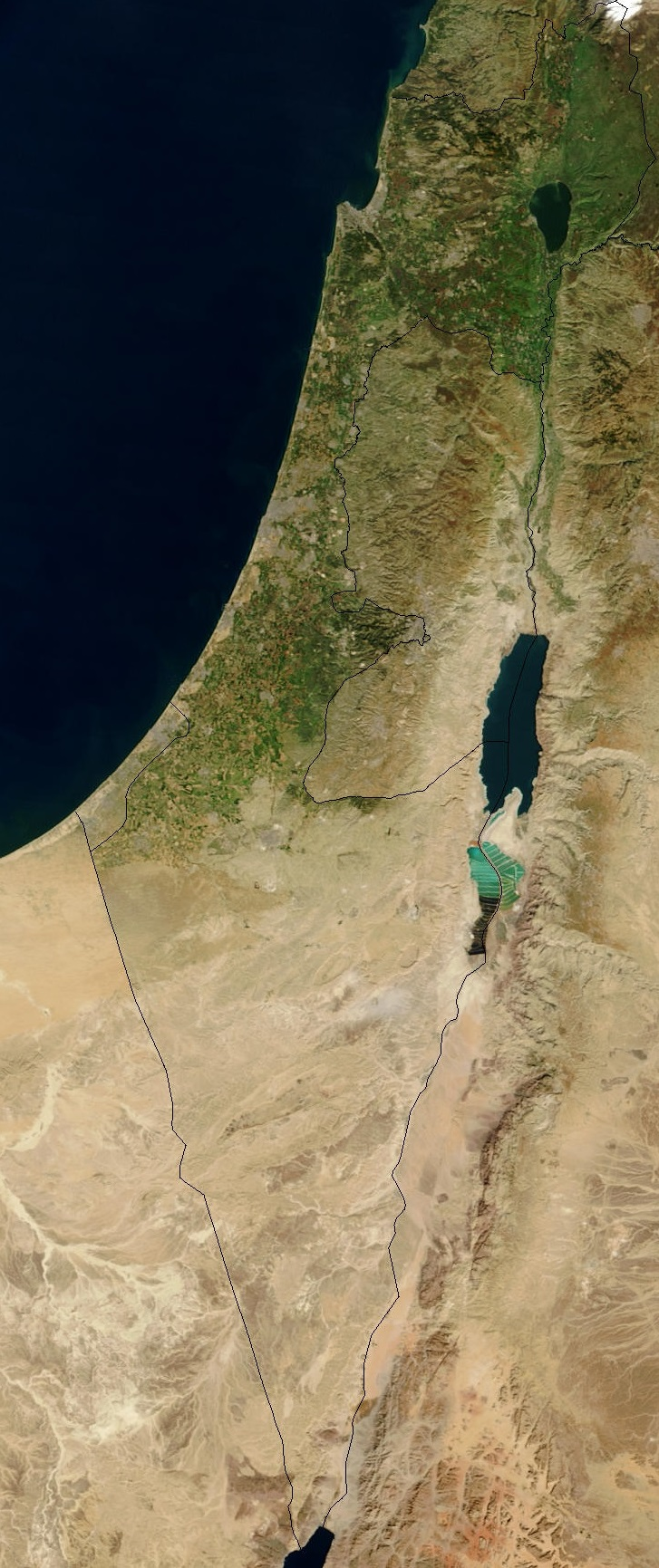
An enlargeable satellite image of Israel and surrounding areas

- Climate of Israel
- Ecology of Israel
  - Ecoregions in Israel
  - Renewable energy in Israel
- Geology of Israel
- Green building in Israel
- National parks of Israel
- Protected areas of Israel
- Wildlife of Israel
  - Flora of Israel
  - Fauna of Israel
    - Birds of Israel
    - Mammals of Israel
- Zalul Environmental Association

==== Natural geographic features of Israel ====
- Lakes of Israel
- Rivers of Israel
- World Heritage Sites in Israel

=== Regions of Israel ===
==== Administrative divisions of Israel ====
Administrative divisions of Israel

- Districts of Israel (6)
  - Subdistricts of Israel (15)
    - Natural regions of Israel (50)
      - Municipalities of Israel

===== Districts of Israel =====
Districts of Israel

- Jerusalem District
- Northern District
- Haifa District
- Central District
- Tel Aviv District
- Southern District

===== Municipalities of Israel =====
- Cities of Israel
  - Capital of Israel: Jerusalem and largest city in area and population.
  - Tel Aviv - Israel's commercial center.
  - Haifa - largest city of northern Israel and a major seaport.
  - Beersheba - largest city of southern Israel.
  - Eilat - Israel's southernmost city and only port on the Red Sea.
- Local councils
- Regional councils

=== Demography of Israel ===
Demographics of Israel

== Government and politics of Israel ==
Politics of Israel

- Form of government: parliamentary representative democratic republic
- Capital of Israel: Jerusalem
- Elections in Israel
    - 1949
    - 1951
    - 1955
    - 1959
    - 1961
    - 1965
    - 1969
    - 1973
    - 1977
    - 1981
    - 1984
    - 1988
    - 1992
    - 1996
    - 1999
    - 2003
    - 2006
    - 2009
    - 2013
    - 2015
    - 2019 (Apr)
    - 2019 (Sept)
    - 2020
    - 2021
    - 2022
- Political parties in Israel
- Political scandals of Israel
- Taxation in Israel

=== Branches of the government of Israel ===
==== Executive branch of the government of Israel ====
- Head of state: President of Israel, Isaac Herzog
- Head of government: Prime Minister of Israel, Benjamin Netanyahu
- Governments of Israel
    - Provisional
    - 1
    - 2
    - 3
    - 4
    - 5
    - 6
    - 7
    - 8
    - 9
    - 10
    - 11
    - 12
    - 13
    - 14
    - 15
    - 16
    - 17
    - 18
    - 19
    - 20
    - 21
    - 22
    - 23
    - 24
    - 25
    - 26
    - 27
    - 28
    - 29
    - 30
    - 31
    - 32
    - 33
    - 34
    - 35
    - 36
    - 37

==== Legislative branch of the government of Israel ====
- Knesset (unicameral parliament): Lists of Knesset members

==== Judicial branch of the government of Israel ====
Israeli judicial system

- The Supreme Court of Israel serves as an appellate court, High Court of Justice and constitutional court
- District Courts serve as appellate courts and also serve as courts of first instance for some cases
- Magistrate Courts serve as the court of first instance; some magistrate courts deal with specific affairs
- Separate systems, which include religious courts, military courts, labor courts

=== Foreign relations of Israel ===
Foreign relations of Israel

- Arab–Israeli conflict
  - Six-Day War
  - Yom-Kippur War
  - Israeli–Palestinian peace process
    - Arab-Israeli peace projects
  - Israeli settlement
    - United Nations Security Council Resolution 2334
- Diplomatic missions in Israel
- Diplomatic missions of Israel
- Israel–United States relations

==== International organization membership ====
International organization membership of Israel Israel is a member of:

- Bank for International Settlements (BIS)
- Black Sea Economic Cooperation Zone (BSEC) (observer)
- European Bank for Reconstruction and Development (EBRD)
- European Organization for Nuclear Research (CERN) (observer)
- Food and Agriculture Organization (FAO)
- Inter-American Development Bank (IADB)
- International Atomic Energy Agency (IAEA)
- International Bank for Reconstruction and Development (IBRD)
- International Chamber of Commerce (ICC)
- International Civil Aviation Organization (ICAO)
- International Criminal Court (ICCt) (signatory)
- International Criminal Police Organization (Interpol)
- International Development Association (IDA)
- International Federation of Red Cross and Red Crescent Societies (IFRCS)
- International Finance Corporation (IFC)
- International Fund for Agricultural Development (IFAD)
- International Labour Organization (ILO)
- International Maritime Organization (IMO)
- International Mobile Satellite Organization (IMSO)
- International Monetary Fund (IMF)
- International Olympic Committee (IOC)
- International Organization for Migration (IOM)
- International Organization for Standardization (ISO)
- International Red Cross and Red Crescent Movement (ICRM)
- International Telecommunication Union (ITU)
- International Telecommunications Satellite Organization (ITSO)
- International Trade Union Confederation (ITUC)
- Inter-Parliamentary Union (IPU)
- Multilateral Investment Guarantee Agency (MIGA)
- Organisation for Economic Co-operation and Development (OECD)
- Organization for Security and Cooperation in Europe (OSCE) (partner)
- Organisation for the Prohibition of Chemical Weapons (OPCW) (signatory)
- Organization of American States (OAS) (observer)
- Permanent Court of Arbitration (PCA)
- Southeast European Cooperative Initiative (SECI) (observer)
- United Nations (UN)
- United Nations Conference on Trade and Development (UNCTAD)
- United Nations Educational, Scientific, and Cultural Organization (UNESCO)
- United Nations High Commissioner for Refugees (UNHCR)
- United Nations Industrial Development Organization (UNIDO)
- Universal Postal Union (UPU)
- World Customs Organization (WCO)
- World Federation of Trade Unions (WFTU)
- World Health Organization (WHO)
- World Intellectual Property Organization (WIPO)
- World Meteorological Organization (WMO)
- World Tourism Organization (UNWTO)
- World Trade Organization (WTO)
- World Veterans Federation

=== Law and order in Israel ===
Law of Israel

- Capital punishment in Israel
- Censorship in Israel
- Constitution of Israel
- Crime in Israel
- Human rights in Israel
  - LGBT rights in Israel
  - Freedom of religion in Israel
- Law enforcement in Israel

=== Military of Israel ===
Israel Defense Forces

- Command
  - Commander-in-chief: Eyal Zamir
  - Defence minister: Israel Katz
    - Ministry of Defense of Israel
- Forces
  - Army of Israel
  - Navy of Israel
  - Air Force of Israel
  - Special forces of Israel
- Israeli war crimes
- Wars involving Israel
- Military operations conducted by the Israel Defense Forces
- Military history of Israel
- Military ranks of Israel

=== Local government in Israel ===
Local government in Israel

== History of Israel ==
History of Israel

=== History of Israel by period ===
==== Prehistory of Israel ====
- Prehistory of the Levant

==== Ancient history of Israel ====
History of ancient Israel and Judah

- Canaan
- Israelites
- Kingdom of Israel (united monarchy) (hypothetical)
- Kingdom of Israel (Samaria)
- Kingdom of Judah
- Babylonian rule
- Second Temple period
  - Persian rule
  - Coele-Syria (Hellenistic period)
  - Hasmonean dynasty
  - Herodian dynasty
    - Herodian kingdom
    - Herodian Tetrarchy
    - Destruction of the Second Temple
- Roman period
  - Roman Judea
    - Jewish–Roman wars
      - First Jewish–Roman War (66–73 CE)
        - Siege of Jerusalem (AD 70)
          - Destruction of the Second Temple
      - Bar Kokhba revolt (132–136 CE)
  - Syria Palaestina

==== The Jewish "Middle Ages" in Palestine ====
1st Millennium

- Ancient synagogues in Israel
- Ancient synagogues in Palestine
- development of most of early Rabbinic literature, from the era of Chazal
  - Mishnah, Tosefta, and Minor tractates
  - Halakhic Midrash, and most of the Aggadic Midrashim
- Jerusalem Talmud
- 4th century - Jewish revolt against Constantius Gallus
- 7th century - Jewish revolt against Heraclius
- Piyyut
  - Jose ben Jose, Yannai (Payetan)
- 6th - 10th centuries- the Palestinian Masoretes
  - Niqqud, Hebrew cantillation (trope).

2nd millennium

- Pre-Modern Aliyah
- Chronology of Aliyah in modern times
- Old Yishuv

==== Mandatory Palestine ====
Mandatory Palestine

- Mandate for Palestine
- United Nations Partition Plan for Palestine
- History of the Israeli–Palestinian conflict

==== History of modern Israel ====
Timeline of Israeli history

- History of the Israeli–Palestinian conflict
- Israeli Declaration of Independence
- 1948 Arab–Israeli War
- Austerity in Israel
- Reparations Agreement between Israel and West Germany (1952)
- Six-Day War (1967)
- Yom Kippur War (1973)
- Israeli disengagement from Gaza (2005)
- Gaza war (2023–)

==== Years in Israel ====
1940s
1948
1949

1950s
1950
1951
1952
1953
1954
1955
1956
1957
1958
1959

1960s
1960
1961
1962
1963
1964
1965
1966
1967
1968
1969

1970s
1970
1971
1972
1973
1974
1975
1976
1977
1978
1979

1980s
1980
1981
1982
1983
1984
1985
1986
1987
1988
1989

1990s
1990
1991
1992
1993
1994
1995
1996
1997
1998
1999

2000s
2000
2001
2002
2003
2004
2005
2006
2007
2008
2009

2010s
2010
2011
2012
2013
2014
2015
2016
2017
2018
2019

2020s
2020
2021
2022
2023
2024
2025
2026

=== History of Israel by region ===
- History of Jerusalem (timeline)
- History of Tel Aviv (timeline)

=== History of Israel by subject ===
- Economic history of Israel
  - Start-up Nation
- Jewish history
  - History of the Jews and Judaism in the Land of Israel
  - Jewish refugees
- Military history of Israel
  - History of the Israel Defense Forces
  - Arab–Israeli conflict
    - History of the Israeli–Palestinian conflict
- Postage stamps and postal history of Israel

== Culture of Israel ==
Culture of Israel

- Architecture of Israel
- Cuisine of Israel
- Ethnic minorities in Israel
- Festivals in Israel
- Humor in Israel
- Languages of Israel
- Media of Israel
- National symbols of Israel
  - Coat of arms of Israel
  - Flag of Israel
  - National anthem of Israel
- People of Israel
- Prostitution in Israel
- Public holidays in Israel
- Records of Israel
- Religion in Israel
  - Buddhism in Israel
  - Christianity in Israel
  - Hinduism in Israel
  - Islam in Israel
  - Judaism in Israel
- World Heritage Sites in Israel
- List of synagogues in Israel

=== Art in Israel ===
- Art in Israel
- Cinema of Israel
- Literature of Israel
- Music of Israel
- Television in Israel
- Theatre in Israel

=== Sports in Israel ===
Sports in Israel

- Football in Israel

== Economy and infrastructure of Israel ==
Economy of Israel

- Economic rank, by nominal GDP
- Agriculture in Israel
- Banking in Israel
  - National Bank of Israel
- Communications in Israel
  - Internet in Israel
- Companies of Israel
- Currency of Israel: New Sheqel
  - ISO 4217: ILS
- Economic history of Israel
  - Start-up Nation
- Energy in Israel
  - Energy policy of Israel
  - Oil industry in Israel
- Health care in Israel
- Mining in Israel
- Science and technology in Israel
- Tourism in Israel
- Transport in Israel
- Israel Stock Exchange
- Transportation in Israel
  - Airports in Israel
  - Rail transport in Israel
  - Roads in Israel
- Water supply and sanitation in Israel

== Education in Israel ==
Education in Israel

== See also ==
Israel

- List of international rankings
- Member state of the United Nations
- Outline of Asia
- Outline of geography
