= List of Israeli films of 1960 =

A list of films produced by the Israeli film industry in 1960.

== 1960 releases ==
Premiere	Title	Director	Cast	Genre	Notes	Ref
?	They Were Ten (Hebrew: הם היו עשרה)	Baruch Dienar		Drama		
?	Burning Sands	Raphael Nussbaum	Uri Zohar	Adventure	An Israeli-West German co-production	
?	A Story of David	Bob McNaught	Jeff Chandler, Basil Sydney	Drama	An Israeli-British co-production	

== See also ==
- 1960 in Israel
