= 1962 in Israel =

- Decades: 1940s; 1950s; 1960s; 1970s; 1980s
- See also: History of Israel; Timeline of Israel history; List of years in Israel

Events in the year 1962 in Israel.

== Incumbents ==
- Prime Minister of Israel – David Ben-Gurion (Mapai)
- President of Israel – Yitzhak Ben-Zvi
- President of the Supreme Court – Yitzhak Olshan
- Chief of General Staff – Tzvi Tzur
- Government of Israel – 10th Government of Israel

== Events ==
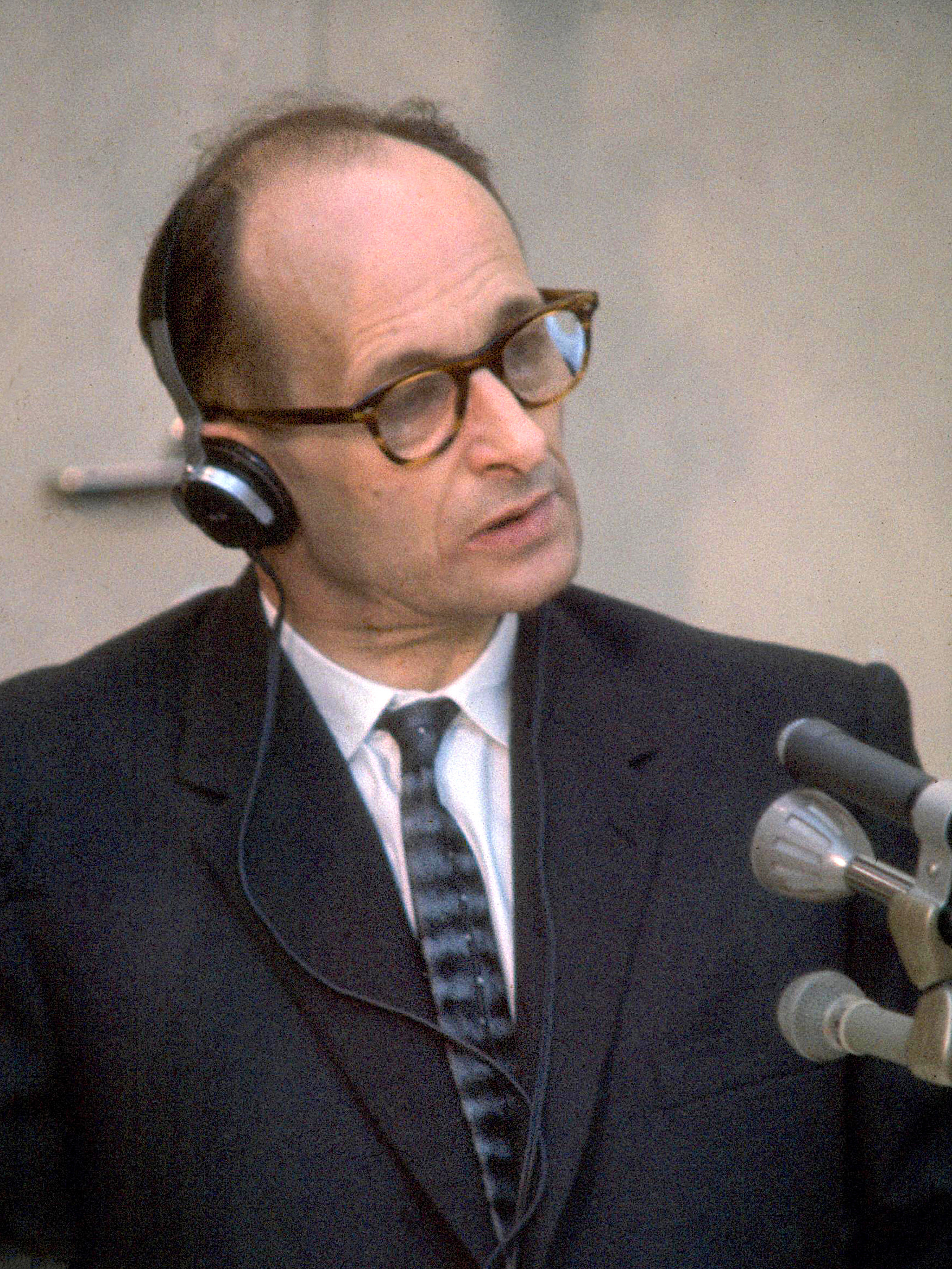
Former SS officer Adolf Eichmann (pictured in 1961) is executed

- 16 March – Operation Swallow: Following a series of Syrian attacks on Israeli fishermen in the Sea of Galilee, IDF forces raid Syrian posts in the village of Nokyeab. During the operation 30 Syrian and seven Israeli soldiers are killed.
- 22 March – Adolf Eichmann began an appeal to an Israeli court, as his lawyer, Robert Servatius sought to spare Eichmann from the death sentence ordered in his 1961 war crimes conviction. The verdict would be upheld, and Eichmann would be executed on 31 May.
- 31 May – Nazi war criminal Adolf Eichmann, one of the main people responsible for the actual implementation of the Final Solution Plan, is executed by hanging in Israel. Eichmann is the only person to have been executed in Israel on conviction by a civilian court.

=== Israeli–Palestinian conflict ===
The most prominent events related to the Israeli–Palestinian conflict which occurred during 1962 include:

Notable Palestinian militant operations against Israeli targets

The most prominent Palestinian fedayeen terror attacks committed against Israelis during 1962 include:

- 12 April – Armed Palestinian Arab militants, who infiltrated into Israel, fired on an Egged bus on the way to Eilat; one passenger was wounded.
- 30 September – Two armed Palestinian Arab militants, who infiltrated into Israel, attacked an Egged bus on the way to Eilat. No one was wounded.

Notable Israeli military operations against Palestinian militancy targets

The most prominent Israeli military counter-terrorism operations (military campaigns and military operations) carried out against Palestinian militants during 1962 include:

=== Unknown dates ===
- The founding of the town Arad.
- The founding of the kibbutz Eilot.

== Notable births ==
- 13 April – Hillel Slovak, Israeli-American guitarist (Red Hot Chili Peppers) (died 1988).
- 9 June – Yuval Banai, Israeli singer.
- 21 November – Avri Gilad, Israeli media personality.
- 26 December – Eli Yishai, Israeli politician and head of the Shas party.

== Notable deaths ==
- 2 February – Shlomo Hestrin (born 1914), Canadian-born Israeli biochemist.
- 14 May – Dov Karmi (born 1905), Russian (Ukraine)-born Israeli architect.
- 31 May – Adolf Eichmann (born 1906), German Nazi and SS-Obersturmbannführer (Lieutenant Colonel) and one of the major organizers of the Holocaust, executed in prison at Ramla, Israel
- 6 June – Abba Ahimeir (born 1897), Russian-born Israeli journalist, historian and political activist.
- 10 July – Yehuda Leib Maimon (born 1875), Russian (Bassarabia)-born Israeli rabbi and government minister.
- 15 August – Benzion Yadler (born 1871), Maggid in Jerusalem and Moshavot of Israel.
- 28 August – Herzl Berger (born 1904), Russian (Belarus)-born Israeli activist and politician.
- 24 October – Hanan Rubin (born 1908), German-born Israeli politician.

== See also ==
- 1962 in Israeli film
- 1962 in Israeli music
- 1962 in Israeli sport
