= List of Israeli films of 1961 =

A list of films produced by the Israeli film industry in 1961.

== 1961 releases ==
Premiere	Title	Director	Cast	Genre	Notes	Ref
?	I Like Mike (Hebrew: איי לייק מייק)	Peter Frye			Entered into the 1961 Cannes Film Festival	
?	Third Side of the Coin					
?	They Were Ten					

== See also ==
- 1961 in Israel
