= List of Israeli films of 1959 =

A list of films produced by the Israeli film industry in 1959.

== 1959 releases ==
Premiere	Title	Director	Cast	Genre	Notes	Ref
?	Amud Ha'Esh (Hebrew: עמוד האש, lit. "Pillar of Fire")	Larry Frisch	Nehama Hendel, Shlomo Jacobi, Amos Mokadi	Drama	Geva Films	

== See also ==
- 1959 in Israel
