= 1961 in Israel =

- Decades: 1940s; 1950s; 1960s; 1970s; 1980s
- See also: History of Israel; Timeline of Israel history; List of years in Israel

Events in the year 1961 in Israel.

== Incumbents ==
- Prime Minister of Israel – David Ben-Gurion (Mapai)
- President of Israel – Yitzhak Ben-Zvi
- President of the Supreme Court – Yitzhak Olshan
- Chief of General Staff – Haim Laskov until 1 January, Tzvi Tzur
- Government of Israel – 9th Government of Israel until 2 November, 10th Government of Israel

== Events ==
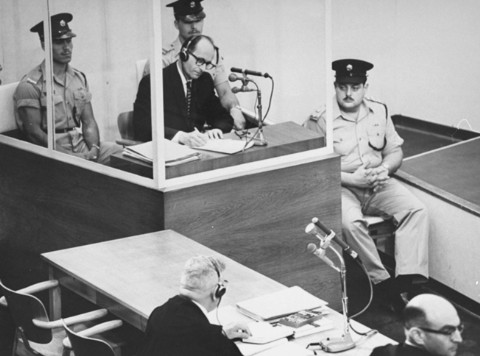
Adolf Eichmann inside his glass booth during his trial in Jerusalem, 29 May 1961

- 1 January – Tzvi Tzur is appointed as the 6th Chief of Staff of the Israel Defense Forces.
- 11 January – The Pisces, a yacht carrying Moroccan Jews to Israel, capsized off the coast of Algeciras, Spain, drowning the 40 passengers and all but 3 of the crew. The ship's captain survived.
- 5 July – The first Israeli rocket, Shavit 2, is launched.
- 11 April – Adolf Eichmann's trial begins before an Israeli court in Jerusalem. Eichmann is indicted on 15 criminal charges, including crimes against humanity, crimes against the Jewish people and membership in an outlawed organization. The trial is the subject of a great deal of international controversy and creates huge international interest.
- 22 May – Population Census: 2,179,491 inhabitants in Israel.
- 20 June – Ten weeks into his war crimes trial, the prosecution having rested, Adolf Eichmann took the witness stand in his own defense, but refused to swear on the Bible.
- July – The 1961 Maccabiah Games are held.
- 5 July – The first Israeli rocket, Shavit 2, was launched. At 4:41 am, the rocket was launched "from a secret installation on the Mediterranean".
- 14 August – The trial of Adolf Eichmann adjourned in Israel after 73 days, and the three judge panel began deliberating the evidence.
- 15 August – elections were held for the 120 seats in the fifth Knesset. The Mapai Party, led by Prime Minister David Ben-Gurion, lost five seats, retaining 42, with the Herut Party second with 17.;
- 2 November – Israel's Prime Minister David Ben-Gurion received approval to form a new coalition government, with the Knesset approving a vote of confidence, 63–46.
- 28 November – After Morocco's King Hassan II agreed to allow the Arab nation's Jewish minority to leave, the first group 105 Jews was allowed to fly out to Israel. By the end of the year, 11,478 had left, and over the next two years, the 85,000 members of the community had emigrated.
- 1 December – Israel announced plans to establish "the world's first chain of industrial co-operative towns" in the Negev Desert, starting with the community of Mitzpe Ramon.
- 11 December – Adolf Eichmann is convicted of crimes against humanity by a panel of three Israeli judges.
- 15 December – An Israeli war crimes tribunal sentences Adolf Eichmann to death for his part in The Holocaust.

=== Israeli–Palestinian conflict ===
The most prominent events related to the Israeli–Palestinian conflict which occurred during 1961 include:

Notable Palestinian militant operations against Israeli targets

The most prominent Palestinian fedayeen terror attacks committed against Israelis during 1961 include:

Notable Israeli military operations against Palestinian militancy targets

The most prominent Israeli military counter-terrorism operations (military campaigns and military operations) carried out against Palestinian militants during 1961 include:

== Notable births ==
- 3 March – Ze'ev Nechama, Israeli singer, songwriter and composer.
- 3 May – Ya'akov Eilon, Israeli journalist and news anchorman.
- 10 June – Sey Heiman, Israeli singer.
- 11 July – Ophir Pines-Paz, Israeli politician.
- 27 July – Erez Tal, Israeli media personality.
- 10 December – Oded Schramm, Israeli mathematician (died 2008).

== Notable deaths ==
- 22 March – Gideon Mer (born 1894), Russian (Lithuania)-born Israeli physician, scientist and malaria researcher.
- 30 April – Peretz Naftali (born 1888), German-born Zionist activist and Israeli politician.
- 30 May – Binyamin Mintz (born 1903), Russian (Poland)-born Israeli politician.
- 25 June – Ezra Ichilov (born 1907), Israeli politician.
- 8 October – Moshe Smoira (born 1888), first President of the Supreme Court of Israel

== See also ==
- 1961 in Israeli film
- 1961 in Israeli music
- 1961 in Israeli sport
