= 1963 in Israel =

- Decades: 1940s; 1950s; 1960s; 1970s; 1980s
- See also: History of Israel; Timeline of Israeli history; List of years in Israel

Events in the year 1963 in Israel.

== Incumbents ==
- Prime Minister of Israel – David Ben-Gurion (Mapai) until 26 June, Levi Eshkol (Mapai)
- President of Israel – Yitzhak Ben-Zvi until 23 April, (Kadish Luz, acting president 23 April to 21 May), Zalman Shazar from 21 May
- President of the Supreme Court – Yitzhak Olshan
- Chief of General Staff – Tzvi Tzur
- Government of Israel – 10th Government of Israel until 26 June, 11th Government of Israel

== Events ==
- 23 April – President Yitzhak Ben-Zvi dies in office and Kadish Luz, Speaker of the Knesset, becomes acting President pending the election of a new President.
- 21 May – In the 1963 presidential election, the Knesset elects Zalman Shazar as President of Israel, by a majority of 67 to 33 votes caste in favour of his opponent, Peretz Bernstein. Shazar assumes office immediately as the third president of the State of Israel.
- 16 June – David Ben-Gurion resigns as prime minister for what he describes as personal reasons and chooses Levi Eshkol as his successor.
- 26 June – Levi Eshkol is elected Prime Minister of Israel. The 11th Government is approved that day and the members are sworn in.
- 5 July – Diplomatic relations between the Israeli and the Japanese governments are raised to embassy level.

=== Israeli–Palestinian conflict ===
The most prominent events related to the Israeli–Palestinian conflict which occurred during 1963 include:

Notable Palestinian militant operations against Israeli targets

The most prominent Palestinian fedayeen terror attacks committed against Israelis during 1963 include:

Notable Israeli military operations against Palestinian militancy targets
The most prominent Israeli military counter-terrorism operations (military campaigns and military operations) carried out against Palestinian militants during 1963 include:

=== Unknown dates ===
- The re-establishment of the moshav Avivim.
- The founding of the kibbutz Grofit.

== Births ==
- 12 January – Rami Heuberger, Israeli actor and entertainer.
- 2 May – Yoram Yosefsberg, Israeli actor and voice actor
- 2 July – Hagai Levi, Israeli film director
- 25 August – Avi Ran, Israeli footballer (goalkeeper) (died 1987).
- 18 September – Uri Fink, Israeli comic book artist and writer.
- 4 October – Ronny Rosenthal, former Israeli footballer.
- 4 November – Lior Birkan, swimming champion (died 2020).
- 5 November – Yair Lapid, Israeli journalist, author, TV presenter and politician.
- 20 December – Tal Friedman, Israeli comedian, actor and musician.

== Notable deaths ==
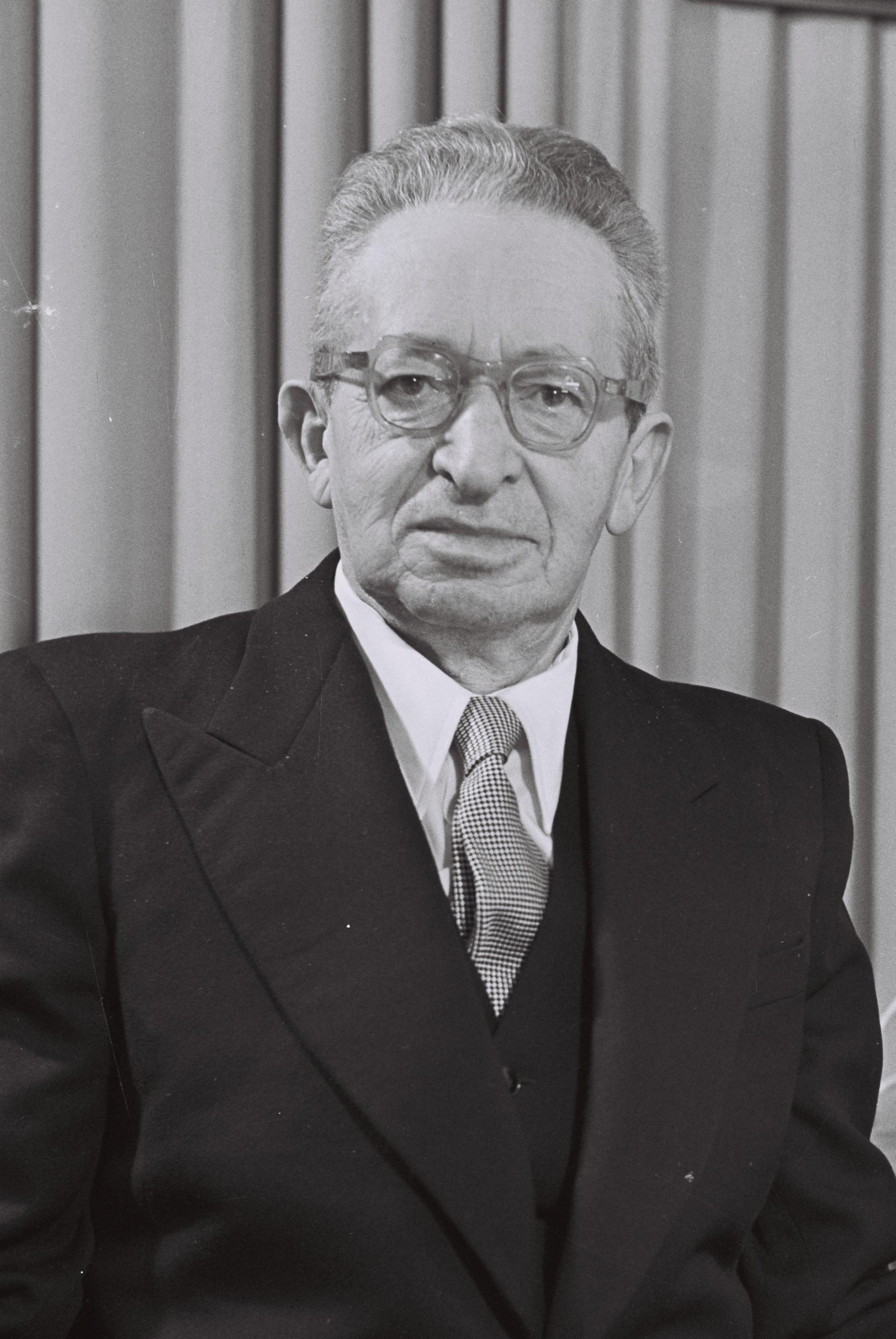
Yitzhak Ben-Zvi

- 13 February – Daniel Auster (born 1893), Austro-Hungarian (Galicia)-born Israeli politician, the first Jewish Mayor of Jerusalem.
- 23 April – Yitzhak Ben-Zvi (born 1884), Russian (Ukraine)-born Labor Zionist leader and the second President of Israel.
- 17 May – Ami Assaf (born 1903), Israeli politician.
- 8 June – Haim Boger (born 1876), Russian (Crimea)-born Zionist activist and Israeli politician.
- 23 July – Shlomo Lavi (born 1882), Russian (Poland)-born Zionist activist and Israeli politician.
- 9 October – Yehezkel Kaufmann (born 1889), Russian (Ukraine)-born Israeli philosopher and Biblical scholar.

== See also ==
- 1963 in Israeli film
