= 1958 in Israel =

- Decades: 1930s; 1940s; 1950s; 1960s; 1970s
- See also: History of Israel; Timeline of Israeli history; List of years in Israel

Events in the year 1958 in Israel.

== Incumbents ==
- Prime Minister of Israel – David Ben-Gurion (Mapai)
- President of Israel – Yitzhak Ben-Zvi
- President of the Supreme Court – Yitzhak Olshan
- Chief of General Staff - Moshe Dayan until 29 January, Haim Laskov
- Government of Israel - 7th Government of Israel until 17 December, 8th Government of Israel

== Events ==
- 7 January – Prime Minister David Ben-Gurion presents his cabinet for a Knesset "Vote of Confidence". The 8th Government is approved that day and the members were sworn in.
- 29 January – Haim Laskov is appointed as the fifth Chief of Staff of the Israel Defense Forces.
- 12 February – Israel's Knesset passes the Basic Knesset Law (חוק יסוד: הכנסת).
- 8 April – The founding of the moshav Aviezer.
- 22 April – Jordanian soldiers shot and killed two Israeli fishermen near Aqaba.
- 19 August – The first International Bible Contest is held - in the International Convention Center in Jerusalem.
- 17 November – Syrian militants killed the wife of the British air attaché in Israel, who was staying at the guesthouse of the Italian Convent on the Mount of Beatitudes.

=== Israeli–Palestinian conflict ===
The most prominent events related to the Israeli–Palestinian conflict which occurred during 1958 include:

Notable Palestinian militant operations against Israeli targets

The most prominent Palestinian fedayeen terror attacks committed against Israelis during 1958 include:

- 11 February – Armed Palestinian Arab militants killed a resident of moshav Yanuv who was on his way to Kfar Yona, in the Sharon area.
- 5 April – Armed Palestinian Arab militants lying in an ambush shot and killed two Israeli civilians near Tel Lakhish.
- 26 May – Armed Palestinian Arab militants killed four Israeli police officers at Mount Scopus, in Jerusalem.
- 3 December – Armed Palestinian Arab militants killed a shepherd at Kibbutz Gonen.

Notable Israeli military operations against Palestinian militancy targets

The most prominent Israeli military counter-terrorism operations (military campaigns and military operations) carried out against Palestinian militants during 1958 include:

=== Unknown dates ===
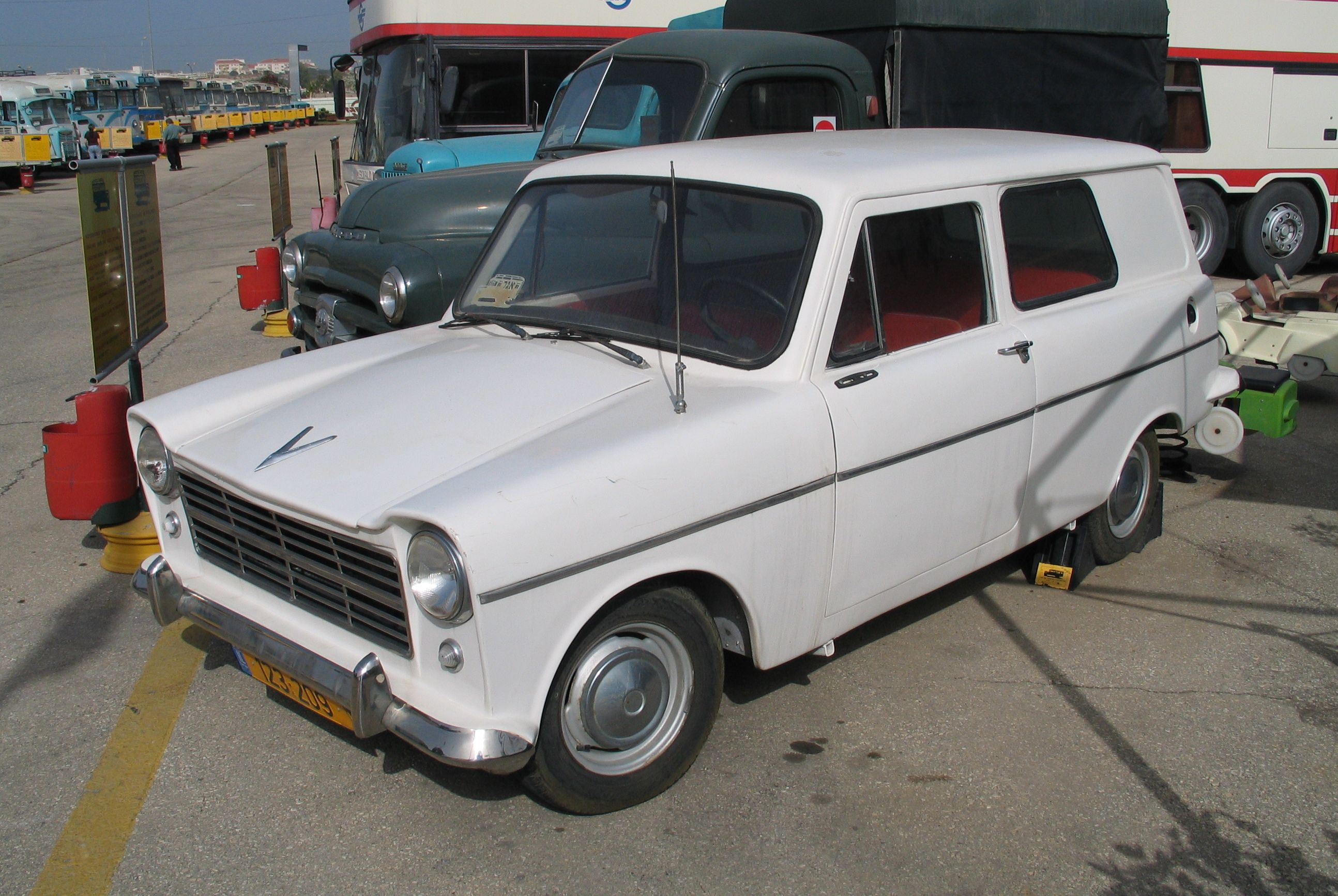
Autocars Susita 12/50

- The Israeli motor vehicle manufacturer Autocars Co. presents the first Sussita (סוסיתא) car.
- The construction of the Negev Nuclear Research Center begins with French assistance.
- The founding of the moshav Givat Yeshayahu.
- The founding of the kibbutz Adamit.

== Notable births ==
- 6 January – Shlomo Glickstein, former Israeli tennis player.
- 5 May – Ron Arad, Israeli soldier classified as missing in action after being captured in Lebanon in 1986.
- 29 May – Juliano Mer-Khamis, Israeli actor, filmmaker and political activist of Jewish and Arab origin (died 2011).
- 1 June – Ahron Bregman, Israeli-English political scientist and journalist
- 8 July – Tzipi Livni, Israeli politician, the Israeli Opposition Leader between 2009 and 2012, former leader of the Kadima party.
- 4 August – Silvan Shalom, Israeli politician.
- 27 November – Anat Atzmon, Israeli actress and singer.

== Notable deaths ==
- 18 May – Jacob Fichman (born 1881), Romanian-born Israeli poet and essayist.
- 13 June – Siegfried Lehman (born 1892), German-born Israeli educator.
- 27 October – Joseph Klausner (born 1874), Russian (Lithuania)-born Israeli Jewish historian and professor of Hebrew Literature.
