= 1960 in Israel =

- Decades: 1940s; 1950s; 1960s; 1970s; 1980s
- See also: History of Israel; Timeline of Israeli history; List of years in Israel

Events in the year 1960 in Israel.

== Incumbents ==
- Prime Minister of Israel – David Ben-Gurion (Mapai)
- President of Israel – Yitzhak Ben-Zvi
- President of the Supreme Court – Yitzhak Olshan
- Chief of General Staff – Haim Laskov
- Government of Israel – 9th Government of Israel

== Events ==
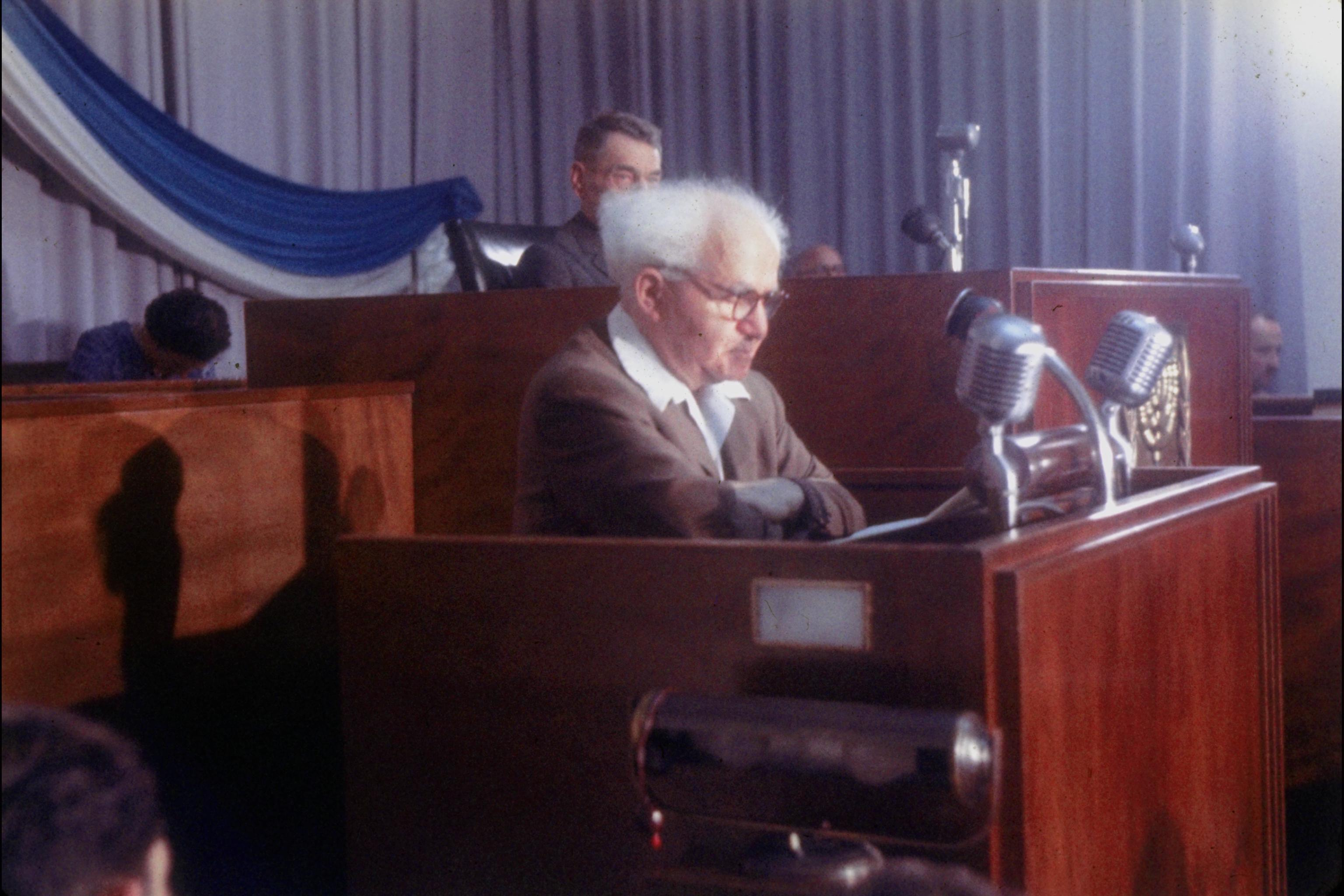
23 May 1960: Israeli Premier Ben Gurion announces capture of Nazi war criminal Adolf Eichmann by the Mossad

- 31 January – Operation Tawfiq (פעולת תאופיק): The first Israeli retribution operation initiated after the Suez Crisis. The operation is carried out by Golani forces on the Syrian village of Tawfiq, in response to attacks on Israelis in Tel Katzir. Tawfiq was designated by the IDF as the center of many Syrian attacks and as a result it was decided that the destruction of the village was vital. During the operation, the village is conquered and destroyed while being attacked by Syrian artillery. Six Syrian and three Israeli soldiers are killed during the operation and seven Israeli soldiers are wounded.
- 15 February – War threatened to break out between Israel and the Egypt (at that time partners with Syria in the United Arab Republic), after the UAR's president Nasser received inaccurate information that Israeli troops were massing at Israel's border with Syria. Nasser then sent a major portion of the Egyptian army to Israel's border with Egypt, and Israel then began Operation Rottem. The two sides halted war preparations after discovering the misunderstanding, and both sides stood down on 1 March.
- February/March - The Rotem Crisis.
- 14 March – West German chancellor Konrad Adenauer met with Israeli prime minister David Ben-Gurion at the Waldorf-Astoria Hotel in New York City, the first time a German leader had conferred with a leader of the Jewish state. Two weeks earlier, the two countries had secretly negotiated German financial and military aid to Israel.
- 21 March – In Buenos Aires, Ricardo Klement brought a bouquet of flowers to his wife at their home at 16 Garibaldi Street, confirming to Mossad agents that the Argentine businessman was, as they suspected, Nazi war criminal Adolf Eichmann. The Israeli intelligence service was aware that Eichmann had married on 21 March 1935, while Eichmann was unaware that he had been found after 15 years on the run. The architect of Germany's "Final Solution" genocide, Eichmann eluded capture after the end of World War II.
- 11 May – In Buenos Aires, four Mossad agents abduct the fugitive Nazi war criminal, Adolf Eichmann, in order that he could be taken to Israel and put on trial.
- 12 May – Archaeologist Yigael Yadin announced the discovery of letters from the Bar Kokhba archive during an excavation in the Judean Desert.
- 21 May – An El Al flight took off from Buenos Aires at 12:05 a.m., with kidnapped Nazi fugitive Adolf Eichmann safely on board, to face trial for the Holocaust in Israel.
- 22 May – Adolf Eichmann arrived in Israel at 7:35 a.m., roughly 24 hours after he had been spirited out of Argentina.
- 23 May – Prime Minister David Ben-Gurion of Israel surprised the Knesset at 4:00 p.m., with the announcement that, "Israeli Security Services captured one of the greatest Nazi criminals, Adolf Eichmann... Eichmann is already in detention in Israel, and will soon be put on trial here."
- 3 June – Argentina demanded that Israel return Adolf Eichmann, and then asked for reparations for Eichmann's seizure by Mossad agents in Buenos Aires. On 2 August, the dispute was resolved by Israel keeping Eichmann, but acknowledging that Argentina's fundamental rights had been infringed upon.
- 6 June – The Israeli Air Force receives its first Fouga Magister jets.
- 16 June – The Soreq Nuclear Research Center becomes operational.
- 20 July – The Czech-born scientist Kurt Sitte, who was the head of the Physics Department at the Technion – Israel Institute of Technology, is arrested for espionage.
- 25 July – the Knesset passes the Israel Lands Law (חוק יסוד: מקרקעי ישראל).

=== Israeli–Palestinian Conflict ===
The most prominent events related to the Israeli–Palestinian conflict which occurred during 1960 include:

Notable Palestinian militant operations against Israeli targets

The most prominent Palestinian fedayeen terror attacks committed against Israelis during 1960 include:

- 26 April – Armed Palestinian Arab militants killed a resident of Ashkelon south of the city.

Notable Israeli military operations against Palestinian militancy targets
The most prominent Israeli military counter-terrorism operations (military campaigns and military operations) carried out against Palestinian militants during 1960 include:

=== Unknown dates ===
- The founding of the kibbutz Ein Hatzeva.
- The founding of the kibbutz Even Menachem.

== Notable births ==
- 13 March – Erez Gerstein, commander of the Golani Brigade and Lebanon Liaison Unit, killed by a roadside bomb in Lebanon (died 1999).
- 1 May – Adam, Israeli singer and actor.
- 6 August – Emmanuel Rosen, Israeli journalist, political analyst and media personality.
- 26 August – Avi Kushnir, Israeli entertainer, actor and TV host.
- 22 September – Isaac Herzog, Israeli politician.
- 17 October – Dan Toren, Israeli singer and actor.

== Notable deaths ==
- 10 March – Gad Frumkin (born 1887), Israeli jurist, only Jewish judge on the Supreme Court of Mandatory Palestine.
- 13 March – Yosef Zvi HaLevy (born 1874), Russian (Lithuania)-born Israeli rabbi and judge.
- 24 May – Avraham Arnon (born 1887), Russian (Belarus)-born Israeli educator.
- 19 September – Zecharia Glosca (born 1894), Yemeni-born Israeli politician.
- 15 October – Ya'akov Moshe Toledano (born 1880), Israeli politician and rabbi.
- 20 November – Ya'akov Cohen (born 1881), Russian (Belarus)-born Israeli poet.

== See also ==
- 1960 in Israeli film
- 1960 in Israeli music
- 1960 in Israeli sport
- Israel at the 1960 Summer Olympics
