= Battle of Nukeib =

1962 Syrian victory over Israel

- Part of Arab–Israeli conflict
Date	16–17 March 1962
Location	Al-Nuqayb; Golan Heights, Syria
Result	Syrian victory

Belligerents
Syria	Israel

Commanders and leaders
Lieutenant Colonel Nasih al-Alwani	Mordechai Gur; Zvi Ofer

Units involved
	Golani Brigade

Casualties and losses
35 killed, including the site commander, 20 wounded and one prisoner	Seven dead and 45 wounded, one missing 100 killed and injured per Syria; Several armored vehicles lost Three artillery batteries lost

Battle of Nukeib, called in Syria, Battle of Nairab Hill (Arabic: معركة تل النيرب) and in Israel Operation Swallow (Hebrew: מבצע סנונית) took place between the Syrian and Israeli forces at Tel al-Nairab in the village of Al-Nuqayb, located near the Sea of Galilee.

== Battle ==
Abd al-Karim al-Nahlawi, who planned and orchestrated the coup that caused Syria to split from the United Arab Republic, claimed on this battle that "Israel was assaulting Syria and fights were taking place between the Israelis and the Syrian outposts. In Tell al-Nairab in the town of al-Naqeeb, there was a Palestinian-populated area near to Lake Tiberias, and at the same time, Israel diverted Jordan's waters to the Negev in the south, so Syria was blocking them."

== See also ==
- 1962 Syrian coup d'état attempt
