= Tzvi Tzur =

Israeli military officer (1923–2004)

- צבי צור
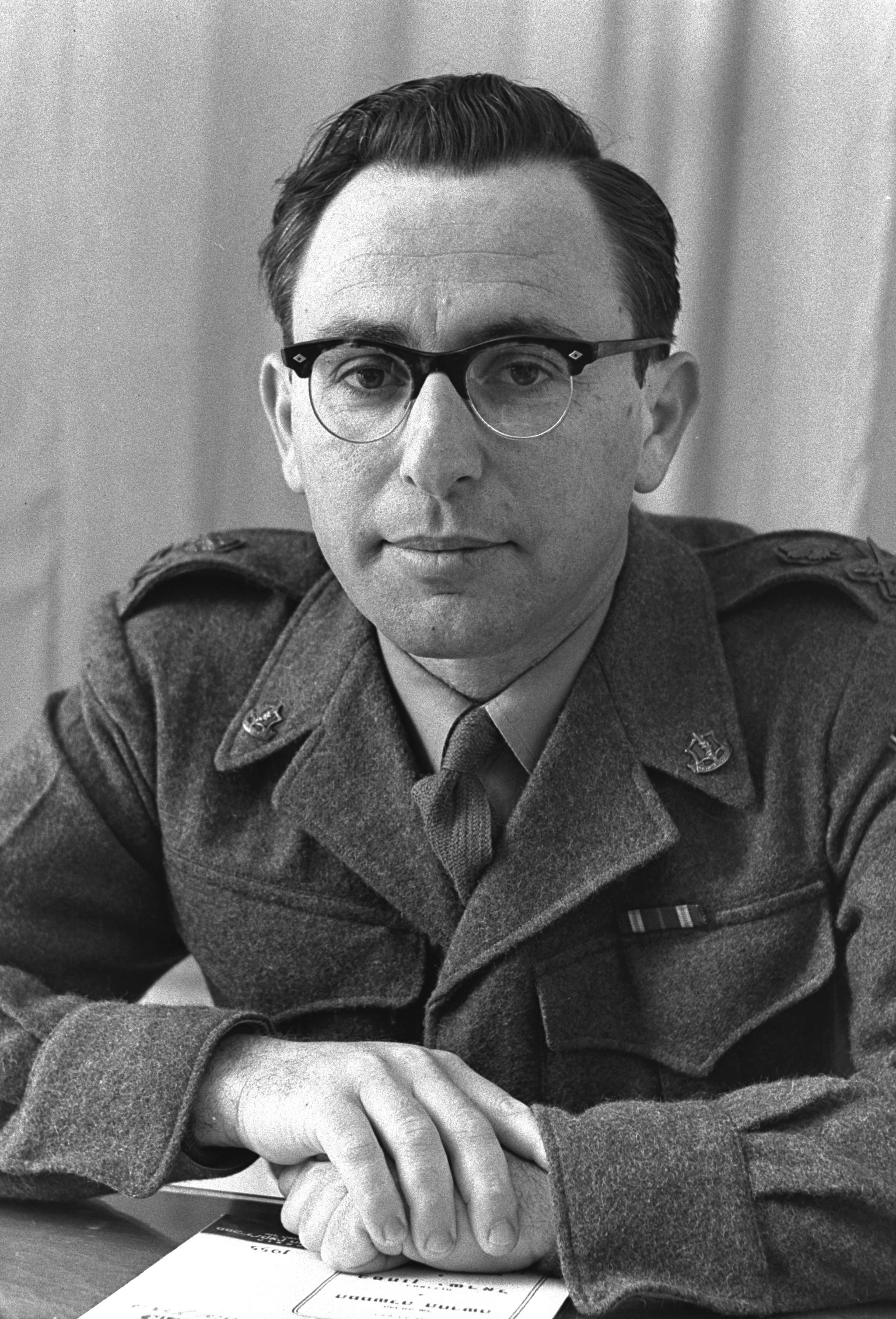
- Tzvi Tzur in 1955

Faction represented in the Knesset
- 1965: Workers List

Personal details
- Born: 17 April 1923 Zaslav, Podolia Governorate, Ukrainian SSR
- Died: 28 December 2004 (aged 81) Tel Aviv, Israel

Military service
- Allegiance: Israel
- Branch/service: > Haganah; Israel Defense Forces
- Years of service: 1936–1963
- Rank: Rav Aluf (Chief of Staff; highest rank)
- Battles/wars: 1948 Arab–Israeli War; Suez Crisis

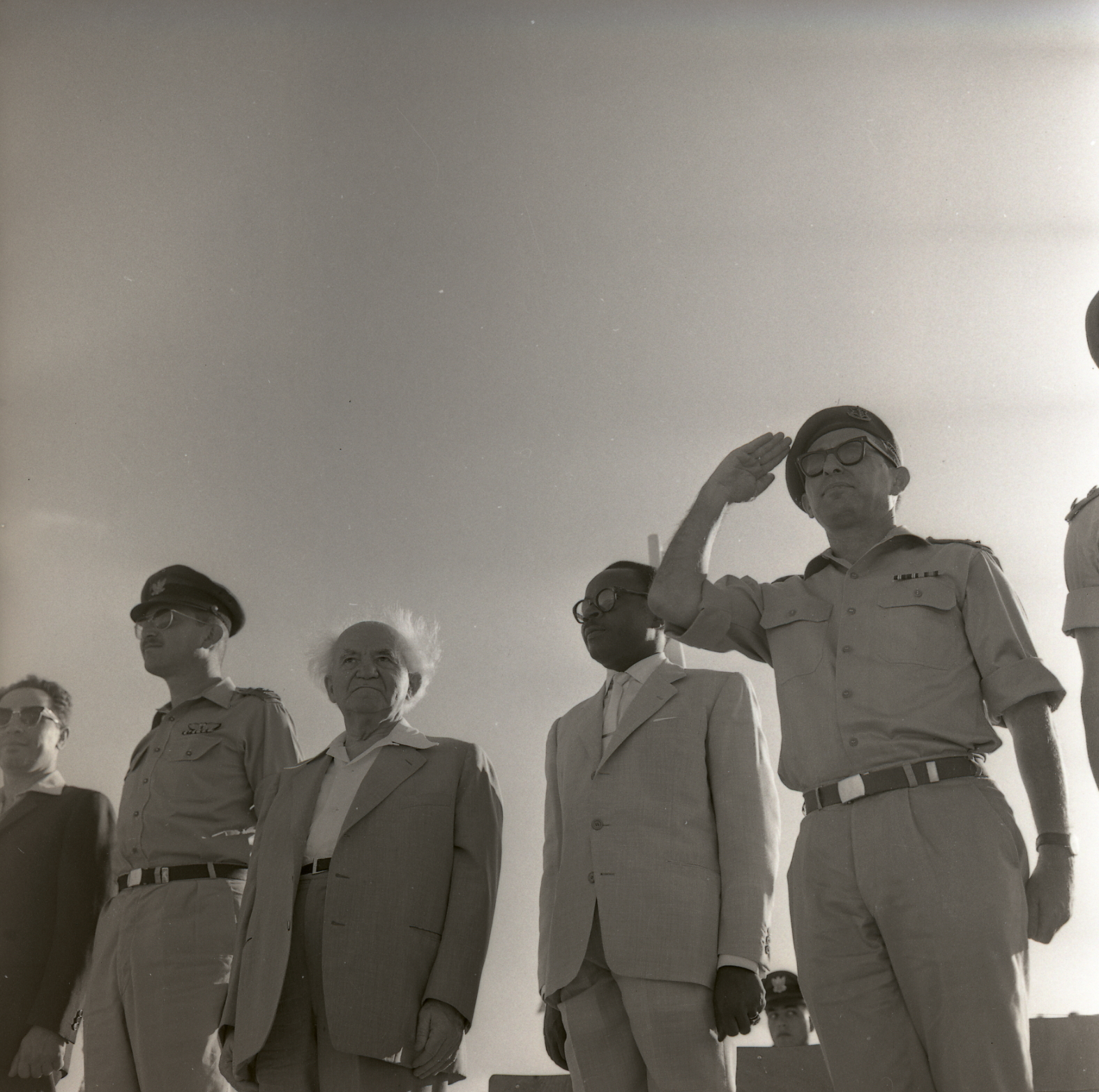
Tzur alongside Israeli prime minister David Ben Gurion. 1960, Boris Carmi, Meitar collection, National Library of Israel

Tzvi Tzur (also transliterated Zvi Tsur; Hebrew: צבי צור; 17 April 1923 – 28 December 2004) was an Israeli officer who served as the IDF's 6th Chief of Staff (1961–1963).

== Biography ==
=== Early life ===
Tzur was born in the Zaslav in the Soviet Union (now Iziaslav in Ukraine) in 1923 to Moshe and Esther Chertenko, as Tsvi Tsera Chertenko, and immigrated to Mandatory Palestine with his parents at the age of two. He studied at the Herzliya Hebrew Gymnasium in Tel Aviv and subsequently at the Tel Aviv School of Law and Economics. In 1936, after the start of the 1936-1939 Arab revolt he joined the Haganah to help protect the Jews from Arab rioters.

=== Military career ===
Tzur initially served as a signaller in the Haganah but rose through the ranks, undergoing a squad commander course and then a platoon commander course in 1942. He was arrested by the British during Operation Agatha and detained for two months. With the outbreak of the 1948 Arab–Israeli War, Tzur was appointed a battalion commander in the Givati Brigade, and participated in Operation Pleshet, among others. Tzur was the founder of the fast jeep reconnaissance company, Samson's Foxes, which fought on the southern front. After the end of the war, he undertook organizing roles and went to study manpower management in the United States.

In 1956 he was promoted to the rank of Major General and was appointed as the commander of the central front. In 1958 he was appointed as deputy chief of staff and went for long period of study in France. He returned in September 1960. The following year he replaced Haim Laskov as the IDF chief of staff.

=== Chief of staff ===
In January 1961 Tzur was appointed as the IDF Chief of Staff. One of his first actions was to appoint Major General Yitzhak Rabin as his deputy. Tzur's term was relatively quiet, except for border incidents with Syria, which shelled Israeli villages from the Golan Heights. The biggest IDF operation during Tzur's term, named Operation Swallow, was held on 16 March 1962, when the Golani Brigade raided Syrian outposts to the north of the Sea of Galilee to stop Syrian shelling. Seven Israeli soldiers and thirty Syrian soldiers were killed during the battle. However, the shelling was not stopped in the area and on 19 August 1963, Syrian forces murdered two civilians in Almagor.

Tzur sought to draw quality manpower to the IDF and decided in June 1961 to provide officers with a private car for their personal usage. The model chosen was a Citroën 2CV.

Tzur also prepared the IDF for a war with the Arab armies and built up the defense forces so that it could stop Arab attacks. In August 1961, the president of Egypt, Gamal Abdul Nasser, revealed that Israel had obtained Dassault Mirage III jet fighters to counter Egyptian Soviet-made MiG-19s. The Mirages proven themselves very well and served as the Israeli Air Force's main fighter for many years. The Mirages contributed substantially to Israel's victory in the Six-Day War and the elimination of the combined Arab airpower of Egypt, Syria and Jordan, as did other two notable acquisitions by Tzur, the Centurion tanks and MIM-23 Hawk surface-to-air missile technology.

Tzur retired from his position as Chief of Staff and from military duty at the end of December 1963.

=== Civilian and political career ===
After his retirement Tzur was appointed as the general manager of Mekorot, Israel's national water company. Under pressure from Moshe Dayan to enter the political fray, in the 1965 elections he was elected to the Knesset on the Rafi list, David Ben-Gurion's party. However, he resigned from the Knesset after just a month, and was replaced by Amos Degani, before returning to work in Mekorot.

With the appointment of Dayan as Minister of Defense in May 1967, Tzur was asked to assist Dayan and served as an adviser to the Minister of Defense for seven years.

After that, Tzur served at several managing positions, including the Israeli Aircraft Industries, the shipping company Zim, and "Hevra LeYsrael".

Tzur was active in public affairs until his last days, and on 29 April 2004 he signed a letter in support of Ariel Sharon's disengament plan. He died in December that year.
