= 1959 in Israel =

- Decades: 1930s; 1940s; 1950s; 1960s; 1970s
- See also: History of Israel; Timeline of Israeli history; List of years in Israel

Events in the year 1959 in Israel.

== Incumbents ==
- Prime Minister of Israel – David Ben-Gurion (Mapai)
- President of Israel – Yitzhak Ben-Zvi
- President of the Supreme Court – Yitzhak Olshan
- Chief of General Staff - Haim Laskov
- Government of Israel - 8th Government of Israel until 17 December, 9th Government of Israel

== Events ==
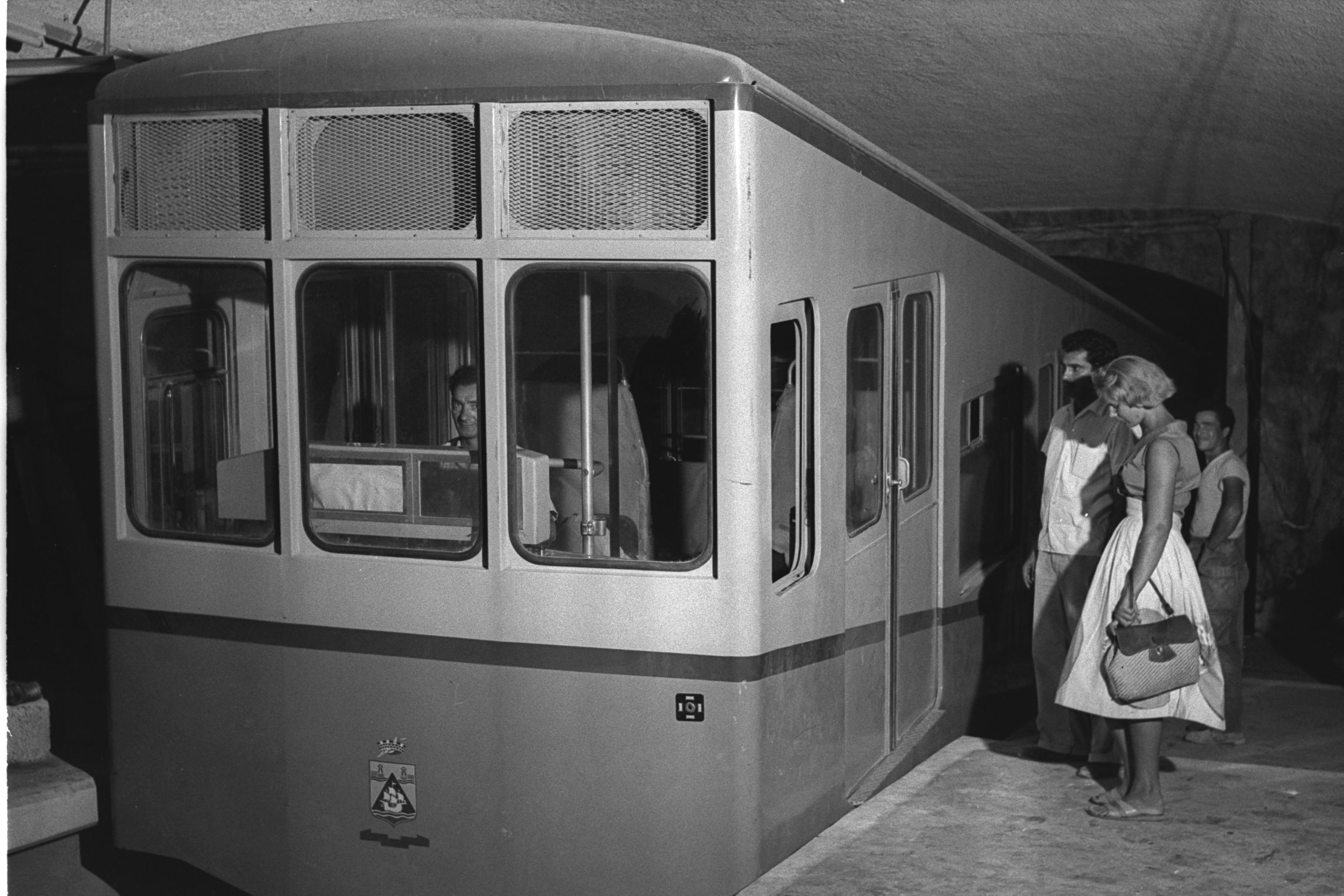
Carmelit first day of operation, 6 October 1959, Haifa, Israel

- 8 January – Four Egyptian MiG-17 jets penetrated Israeli airspace near Beersheba before being driven off by Israeli fighters.
- 1 April – The "Night of the Ducks" scandal: A surprise Israeli military exercise to test the mobilization of the IDF's reserves causes panic throughout Israel and puts the armies of the neighboring Arab states on high alert.
- 7 April – Israel created the first Holocaust Memorial Day by vote of the Knesset in Tel Aviv, to be observed on the 27th day of Nisan, which fell on 5 May in 1959. If the 27th falls on a Friday, the observation is held on the 26th.
- 5 July – David Ben-Gurion resigned as Prime Minister of Israel and new elections were called for the Knesset.
- 9 July – The Wadi Salib riots begin in Haifa.
- 10 July – A memorial for Frank Foley (1884–1958) was dedicated in Harel, Israel, in the form of a forest planted in the desert. As a passport control officer at Britain's embassy in Nazi Germany, Foley flouted strict rules in order to help as many as 10,000 German Jews to leave the country.
- 6 October – The Carmelit, Haifa's underground funicular railway, is opened.
- 3 November – Mapai leader David Ben-Gurion wins the fourth Israeli legislative elections, capturing 47 of the 120 seats, but still 13 short of a majority.
- 4 November – Six Israeli jets and four Egyptian MiG-17s clashed in a dogfight near the border between the two nations. All planes reportedly returned safely and the battle did not lead to further action.
- 17 December – David Ben-Gurion presents his cabinet for a Knesset "Vote of Confidence". The 9th Government is approved that day and the members were sworn in.

=== Israeli–Palestinian conflict ===
The most prominent events related to the Israeli–Palestinian conflict which occurred during 1959 include:

Notable Palestinian militant operations against Israeli targets

The most prominent Palestinian fedayeen terror attacks committed against Israeli targets during 1959 include:

- 1 February – Three Israeli civilians are killed by a terrorist landmine near moshav Zavdiel.
- 15 April – An Israeli guard is killed at kibbutz Ramat Rachel.
- 27 April – Two Israeli hikers are shot at close range and killed near Masada.
- 3 October – A shepherd from kibbutz Heftziba is killed near kibbutz Yad Hana.

Notable Israeli military operations against Palestinian militancy targets
The most prominent Israeli military counter-terrorism operations (military campaigns and military operations) carried out against Palestinian militants during 1959 include:

== Births ==
- 9 April – Hanny Nahmias, actress and entertainer.
- 19 July – Yehuda Meshi Zahav, Haredi social activist, founder of ZAKA (died 2022).

== Deaths ==
- 28 January – Yosef Sprinzak (born 1885), Russian-born leading Zionist activist, an Israeli politician and the first Speaker of the Knesset.
- 20 February – Zalman Shneur (born 1887), Russian (Belarus)-born Israeli poet and writer
- 25 February – Yehudah Arazi (born 1907), Russian (Poland)-born leading Haganah commander.
- 25 February – Eliyahu Berligne (born 1866), Russian-born early Zionist leader and a founder of Tel Aviv.
- 26 February – Selig Suskin (born 1873), Russian-born Israeli agronomist and early Zionist.
- 6 April – Leo Aryeh Mayer (born 1895), Austro-Hungarian (Galicia)-born Israeli scholar of Islamic art and rector of the Hebrew University of Jerusalem.
- 25 July – Rabbi Yitzhak HaLevi Herzog (born 1888), Russian (Poland)-born Chief Rabbi of Ireland, Ashkenazi Chief Rabbi of the British Mandate of Palestine and of Israel.
- 13 September – Israel Rokach (born 1896), Israeli politician, Knesset member, and mayor of Tel Aviv.
- Full date unknown – Shimon Fritz Bodenheimer - (born 1897) German-born Israeli biologist and zoologist.

== See also ==
- 1959 in Israeli film
