= 1965 in Israel =

- Decades: 1940s; 1950s; 1960s; 1970s; 1980s
- See also: History of Israel; Timeline of Israeli history; List of years in Israel

Events in the year 1965 in Israel.

== Incumbents ==
- Prime Minister of Israel – Levi Eshkol (Mapai until 19 May, Alignment)
- President of Israel – Zalman Shazar
- President of the Supreme Court – Yitzhak Olshan; Shimon Agranat
- Chief of General Staff - Yitzhak Rabin
- Government of Israel - 12th Government of Israel

== Events ==
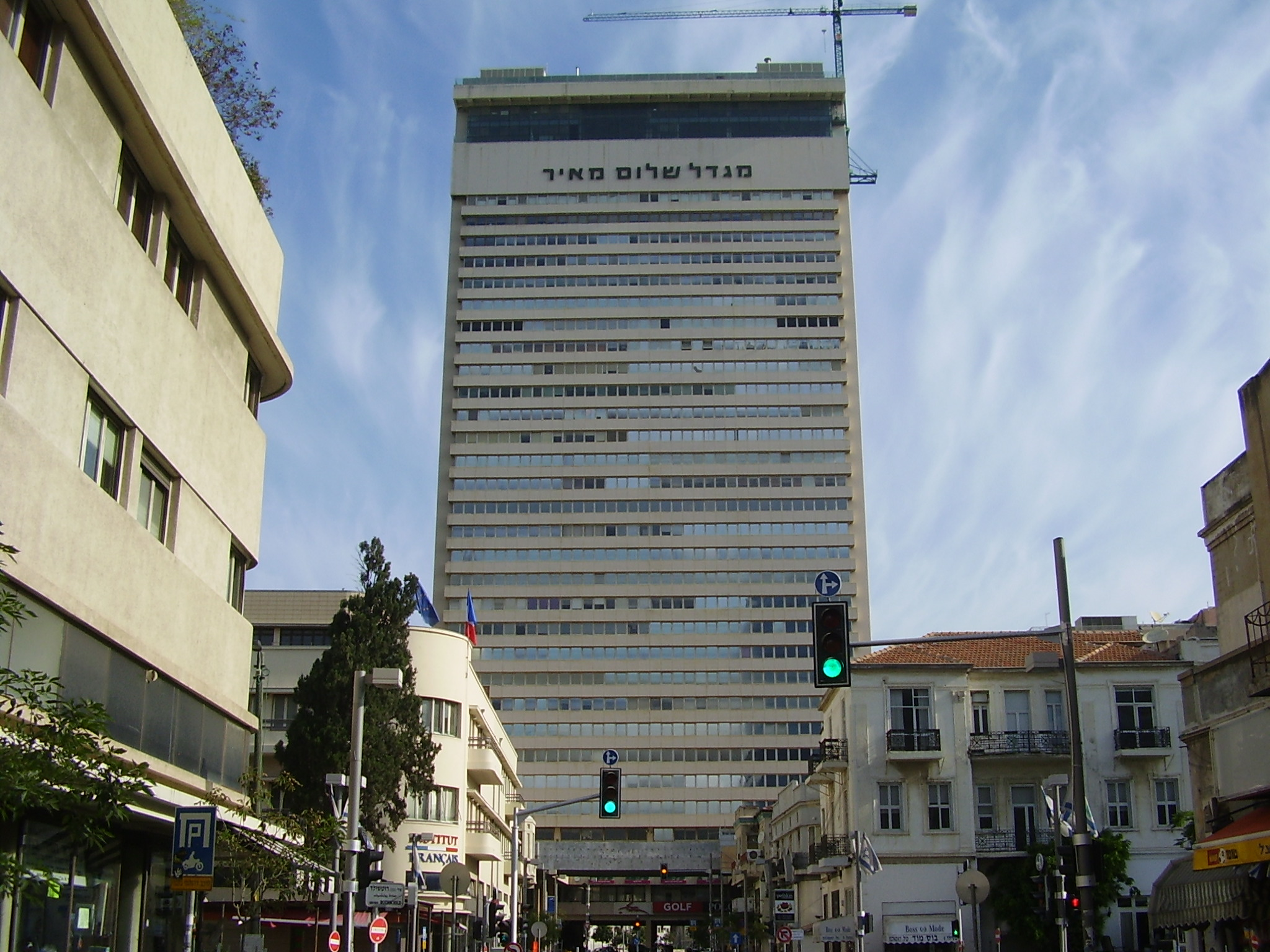
On 21 January, the Shalom Meir Tower officially opens, becoming the tallest building in the Middle East (standing at 142 m)

- 21 January – The Shalom Meir Tower officially opens, becoming the tallest building in the Middle East (standing at 142 m).
- 24 January – Syria announces that it has captured the Israeli spy Eli Cohen.
- 7 March – The Israeli spy, Wolfgang Lotz, is captured in Egypt.
- 14 March – Israel and West Germany establish diplomatic relations, 20 years after the fall of Nazi Germany.
- 11 May – The Israel Museum in Jerusalem is inaugurated.
- 18 May – Israeli spy Eli Cohen is hanged in Damascus, Syria.
- 19 May – The Alignment party is established as an alliance of Mapai and Ahdut HaAvoda.
- 31 May – Jordanian Legionnaires fired on the neighborhood of Musrara in Jerusalem, killing two civilians and wounding four.
- July – The 1965 Maccabiah Games are held.
- 14 July – The Israeli left-wing political party Rafi is founded by David Ben-Gurion, who breaks with Mapai, the ruling party, and leads a breakaway group of eight members of the Knesset, including Moshe Dayan, Shimon Peres, Chaim Herzog, and Teddy Kollek, amongst others.
- 2 November – the Alignment party headed by Levi Eshkol wins the sixth Israeli legislative elections.

=== Israeli–Palestinian conflict ===
The most prominent events related to the Israeli–Palestinian conflict which occurred during 1965 include:

Notable Palestinian militant operations against Israeli targets

The most prominent Palestinian terror attacks committed against Israelis during 1965 include:

- 1 January – Fatah's first major guerrilla attack takes place when Fatah members infiltrated into Israel and attempt to sabotage the National Water Carrier. The squad manages to put an explosive device next to the Water Carrier, but it fails to explode and is later discovered by an Israeli Border Police patrol.
- 1 June – Armed Palestinian armed militants attack a house in Kibbutz Yiftah.
- 29 September – A militant was killed while attempting to attack Moshav Amatzia.
- 7 November – A Fatah cell that infiltrated from Jordan blew up a house in Moshav Givat Yeshayahu, south of Beit Shemesh. The house was destroyed, but the inhabitants were unhurt.

Notable Israeli military operations against Palestinian militancy targets
The most prominent Israeli military counter-terrorism operations (military campaigns and military operations) carried out against Palestinian militants during 1965 include:

- 29 September – Israeli security forces kill a terrorist as he attempted to attack Moshav Amatzia.

== Notable births ==
- 24 February – Nitzan Horowitz, Israeli journalist and politician.
- 28 May – Alon Abutbul, Israeli actor.
- 4 June – Eli Yatzpan, Israeli entertainer.
- 20 October – Amos Mansdorf, Israeli tennis player.

== Notable deaths ==
- 18 May – Eli Cohen (born 1924), Egyptian-born Israeli spy.
- 13 June – Martin Buber (born 1878), Austrian-born Israeli philosopher.
- 7 July – Moshe Sharett (born 1894), Russian (Ukraine)-born second Prime Minister of Israel.
- 28 August – Giulio Racah (born 1909), Italian-born Israeli physicist.
- 15 October – Abraham Fraenkel (born 1891), German-born Israeli mathematician.
- Full date unknown – Shlomo Dykman (born 1917), Polish-born Israeli translator and classical scholar.

== See also ==
- 1965 in Israeli film
- 1965 in Israeli music
- 1965 in Israeli sport
