= List of Israeli films of 1984 =

A list of films produced by the Israeli film industry in 1984.

== 1984 releases ==
Premiere	Title	Director	Cast	Genre	Notes	Ref
June 21	The Last Winter (Hebrew: החורף האחרון)	Riki Shelach Nissimoff	Yona Elian, Kathleen Quinlan	Drama, War	An Israeli-American co-production	

=== Unknown premiere date ===
Premiere	Title	Director	Cast	Genre	Notes	Ref
?	Makat Shemesh (Hebrew: מכת שמש, lit. "Sunstroke")	Yaky Yosha	Yuval Banai, Anat Atzmon, Dalik Volonitz, Eyal Geffen	Drama		
?	Beyond the Walls (Hebrew: מאחורי הסורגים)	Uri Barbash	Arnon Zadok, Mohammad Bakri, Assi Dayan	Drama	Nominated for the Academy Award for Best Foreign Language Film; Won the FIPRESCI Prize in the Venice Film Festival	
?	Lemon Popsicle V (Hebrew: אסקימו לימון 5 - רומן זעיר)	Dan Wolman	Yftach Katzur, Zachi Noy, Jonathan Sagall	Comedy		
?	Atalia (Hebrew: עתליה)	Tzvika Kertzner and Akiva Tevet	Michal Bat-Adam	Drama		
?	Hayal Halayla (Hebrew: חייל הלילה, lit. "Night Soldier")	Dan Wolman	Ze'ev Shimshoni, Iris Kraner	Drama		
?	Edut Me'ones (Hebrew: עדות מאונס, lit. "Forced Testimony")	Raphael Rebibo	Anat Atzmon	Drama, Thriller		
?	Ha-Meticha Ha'Gdola (Hebrew: המתיחה הגדולה, lit. "The Biggest Candid Camera Prank")	Yehuda Barkan and Yigal Shilon	Yehuda Barkan, Mushon Alboher	Comedy		
?	Sapar Nashim (Hebrew: ספר נשים, lit. "The Ladies' Hairdresser")	Ze'ev Revach	Ze'ev Revach, Gabi Amrani	Comedy		
?	Kasach (Hebrew: כסאח)	Haim Gil		Musical		
?	Adama Hamah (Hebrew: אדמה חמה, lit. "Burning Land")	Serge Ankri	Meir Suissa	Drama		
?	B'Yom Bahir Ro'im et Dameshek (Hebrew: ביום בהיר רואים את דמשק, lit. "On a Clear Day You Can See Damascus")	Eran Riklis		Drama		

== Awards ==
=== Ophir Award ===	=== Wolgin Award ===

== See also ==
- 1984 in Israel
