= List of Israeli films of 1983 =

A list of films produced by the Israeli film industry in 1983.

== 1983 releases ==
=== Unknown premiere date ===
| Premiere | Title | Director | Cast | Genre | Notes | Ref |
|---|---|---|---|---|---|---|
| ? | Lemon Popsicle IV (Hebrew: אסקימו לימון 4 - ספיחס) | Boaz Davidson | Yftach Katzur, Zachi Noy, Jonathan Sagall | Comedy, Romance | | |
| ? | Sababa (Hebrew: סבבה, lit. "Cool") | Tzvi Shissel | Zachi Noy, Joseph Shiloach | Comedy | | |
| ? | B'Hinat Bagrut (Hebrew: סבבה, lit. "Final Exams") | Assi Dayan | Dan Toren, Irit Frank | Drama | | |
| ? | Ha-Megillah (Hebrew: המגילה, lit. "The Scroll") | Ilan Eldad | Shlomo Bar-Aba | Musical | | |
| ? | Magash Hakesef (Hebrew: מגש הכסף, lit. "The Silver Platter") | Yehuda Ne'eman | Gidi Gov | Drama | | |
| ? | Hapnimiyah (Hebrew: הפנימייה, lit. "The Boarding school") | Yeud Levanon | Alon Aboutboul | Drama | | |
| ? | Tell Me That You Love Me | Tzipi Trope | Nick Mancuso, Barbara Williams, Andrée Pelletier, Kenneth Welsh | Drama | Canadian-Israeli coproduction | |

== See also ==
- 1983 in Israel
