= 1983 in Israel =

- Decades: 1960s; 1970s; 1980s; 1990s; 2000s
- See also: History of Israel; Timeline of Israeli history; List of years in Israel

Events in the year 1983 in Israel.

== Incumbents ==
- President of Israel – Yitzhak Navon until 5 May, Chaim Herzog
- Prime Minister of Israel – Menachem Begin (Likud) until 10 October, Yitzhak Shamir (Likud)
- President of the Supreme Court – Yitzhak Kahan, Meir Shamgar
- Chief of General Staff – Rafael Eitan until 19 April, Moshe Levi
- Government of Israel – 19th Government of Israel until 10 October, 20th Government of Israel

== Events ==
- 10 February – Israeli peace activist Emil Grunzweig is killed by a hand grenade thrown at him during a peace rally of the Peace Now movement in Jerusalem.
- 14 February – The Israeli government decides to transfer Ariel Sharon from his post as Defense Minister, in light of the recommendations of the Kahan Commission report published on 7 February and appoints Moshe Arens as the new Defense Minister.
- 22 March – The Israeli Knesset elects Chaim Herzog as President of Israel, by a majority of 61 to 57 against Menachem Elon.
- 19 April – Moshe Levi is appointed as the 12th Chief of Staff of the Israel Defense Forces.
- 23 April – Ofra Haza represents Israel at the Eurovision Song Contest with the song “Chai” ("Alive"), achieving second place.
- 1 May – 1983 Negev mid-air collision: During air-to-air combat training over the Negev Desert, an Israeli Air Force F-15D Baz collides with an A-4 Ayit at between 13 and 14 thousand feet altitude, causing the attack jet to explode (the pilot reportedly successfully ejected), and tearing off the starboard wing of the fighter ~2 feet outboard of the engine nacelle. Pilot Zivi Nedivi goes to afterburner to try to stop spinning aircraft, and unaware of the condition of the jet due to fuel leaks obscuring the extent of the damage, makes a blistering 250-260 knot landing at nearest air base, tearing off the arrestor hook and coming to a stop just six feet from the runway threshold.
- 5 May – Chaim Herzog assumes office as the 6th president of the State of Israel.
- 17 May – Lebanon, Israel, and the United States sign an agreement on Israeli withdrawal from Lebanon.
- 4 June – Population Census: 4,037,620 inhabitants in Israel.
- 20 July – The Israeli cabinet votes to withdraw troops from Beirut but to remain in southern Lebanon.
- 28 August – Menachem Begin announces his retirement from politics.
- 2 October – The 1983 Israel bank stock crisis erupts fully. The crisis results in the collapse of the stocks of the four largest banks in Israel, and the government's nationalization of those banks.
- 10 October – Yitzhak Shamir presents his cabinet for a Knesset "Vote of Confidence". The 20th Government is approved that day and the members are sworn in.
- 8 December – Murder of Danny Katz

=== Israeli–Palestinian conflict ===
The most prominent events related to the Israeli–Palestinian conflict which occurred during 1983 include:

Notable Palestinian militant operations against Israeli targets

The most prominent Palestinian Arab terror attacks committed against Israelis during 1983 include:

- 4 November – Suicide attack on the IDF headquarters in Tyre. 61 people are killed, among them 29 Israelis and 32 Lebanese. The Islamic Jihad claimed responsibility for the attack.

Notable Israeli military operations against Palestinian militancy targets

The most prominent Israeli military counter-terrorism operations (military campaigns and military operations) carried out against Palestinian militants during 1983 include:

=== Unknown dates ===
- The founding of the West Bank settlement of Giv'at Ze'ev.
- The founding of the kibbutz Neve Harif.
- The founding of the community settlement Oshrat.

== Notable births ==
- 10 May – Moshe Peretz, musician
- 16 August – Rotem Sela, model, actress, and television presenter
- 20 October – Alona Tal, Israeli singer and actress.
- 21 October – Ninet Tayeb, Israeli singer and actress.
- 21 November – Daniella Pick, singer and model-actress

== Notable deaths ==
- 27 January – Netanel Hochberg (born 1897), Israeli agronomist.
- 10 February – Emil Grunzweig (born 1947), Romanian-born Israeli teacher and peace activist, killed by a grenade thrown into a Peace Now demonstration.
- 13 February – Aryeh Leo Olitzki (born 1898), German-born Israeli bacteriologist and university professor.
- 11 April – Avraham Yoffe (born 1913), Israeli general during the Six-Day War and later on served as a member of the Knesset.
- 16 April – Michael Zohary (born 1898), Austro-Hungary (Galicia)-born Israeli botanist.
- 1 June – Sarah Kafrit (born 1900), Russian-born Israeli politician.
- 19 June – Simha Erlich (born 1915), Polish-born Israeli politician.
- 11 November – Menachem Mendel Kasher (born 1895), Russian (Poland)-born Israeli rabbi and author.

== See also ==
- 1983 in Israeli film
- 1983 in Israeli television
- 1983 in Israeli music
- 1983 in Israeli sport
- Israel in the Eurovision Song Contest 1983
