= List of Israeli films of 1985 =

A list of films produced by the Israeli film industry in 1985.

== 1985 releases ==
=== Unknown premiere date ===
Premiere	Title	Director	Cast	Genre	Notes	Ref
?	Lemon Popsicle VI (Hebrew: אסקימו לימון 6 - הרימו עוגן)	Dan Wolman	Yftach Katzur, Zachi Noy, Jonathan Sagall	Comedy		
?	51 Bar (Hebrew: בר 51)	Amos Guttman	Alon Aboutboul, Mosko Alkalai, Juliano Mer	Crime, Drama		
?	Za'am V'Tehilah (Hebrew: זעם ותהילה, lit. "Rage and Glory")	Avi Nesher	Hana Azoulay-Hasfari, Juliano Mer	Drama		
?	Banot (Hebrew: בנות, lit. "Girls")	Nadav Levitan	Hana Azoulay-Hasfari	Comedy		
?	Ad Sof Halaylah (Hebrew: עד סוף הלילה, lit. "By the end of the night")	Eitan Green	Assi Dayan	Drama		
?	Ha-Me'ahev (Hebrew: המאהב, lit. "The Lover")	Michal Bat-Adam	Michal Bat-Adam	Drama		
?	Shovrim (Hebrew: שוברים, lit. "Breaking")	Avi Nesher	Izhar Ashdot, Gali Atari, Sey Heiman, Alona Kimhi, Meir Banai	Comedy		
?	Koko Ben 19 (Hebrew: קוקו בן 19, lit. "Koko Is 19")	Dan Verete	Udi Cohen	Drama		
?	Irit, Irit (Hebrew: עירית אירית)	Naftali Alter	Irit Alter, Hanan Goldblatt, Ronnie Pinkovitz	Drama		
?	Kompot Na'alyim (Hebrew: קומפוט נעליים, lit. "Kompot Shoes")	Yehuda Barkan, Ezra Shem-Tov	Yehuda Barkan	Comedy		

== Awards ==
=== Ophir Award ===	=== Wolgin Award ===

== See also ==
- 1985 in Israel
