= 1985 in Israel =

- Decades: 1960s; 1970s; 1980s; 1990s; 2000s
- See also: History of Israel; Timeline of Israeli history; List of years in Israel

Events in the year 1985 in Israel.

== Incumbents ==
- President of Israel – Chaim Herzog
- Prime Minister of Israel – Shimon Peres (Alignment)
- President of the Supreme Court – Meir Shamgar
- Chief of General Staff – Moshe Levi
- Government of Israel – 21st Government of Israel

== Events ==
- 17 January – The Israeli government establishes the Bejski Commission, a committee of inquiry charged with investigating the 1983 Israel bank stock crisis.
- 16 February – Israel begins withdrawing troops from Lebanon.
- 10 March – Twelve IDF soldiers are killed in a suicide car attack near Metulla.
- 22 April – Israel signs a Free Trade Agreement with the United States.
- 4 May – Izhar Cohen represents Israel at the Eurovision Song Contest for the second time, with the song "Olé, Olé", achieving fifth place.
- 11 June – HaBonim disaster: 22 people, including 19 children, are killed when a train collides into a school bus at a railway crossing near HaBonim.
- 1 July – The Israeli government introduces the Economic Stabilization Plan to counter the dire economic situation and rapidly growing inflation.
- July – The 1985 Maccabiah Games are held.
- 4 September – The Israeli new shekel (NIS) is introduced. It does not replace the old shekel as Israel's official currency until 1 January 1986.
- 5 October – Ras Burqa massacre: An Egyptian soldier shoots and kills seven Israeli vacationers (including four children) at Ras Burqa, a beach resort in the Sinai peninsula.
- 21 November – Jonathan Pollard, a US naval intelligence analyst who spied for Israeli intelligence, is arrested by the FBI at the gates of the Israeli Embassy in Washington while trying to seek asylum there.

=== Israeli–Palestinian conflict ===
The most prominent events related to the Israeli–Palestinian conflict which occurred during 1985 include:

Notable Palestinian militant operations against Israeli targets

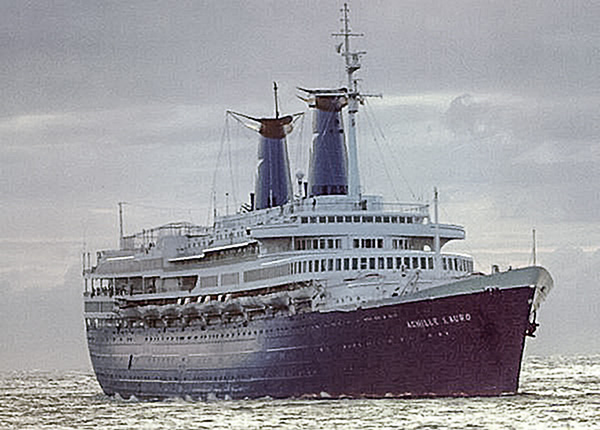
MS Achille Lauro

The most prominent Palestinian Arab terror attacks committed against Israelis during 1985 include:

- 9 April – Sana'a Mouhadly of the Syrian Social Nationalist Party detonated herself in an explosive-laden vehicle in Lebanon, killing two Israeli soldiers and injuring two more, becoming the first reported female suicide bomber.
- 21 May – The Jibril Agreement – Israel releases 1,150 security prisoners being held in Israeli prisoners in exchange for three Israeli soldiers captured during the 1982 Lebanon War.
- 25 September – An Arab terrorist cell takes over an Israeli yacht off the coast of Larnaca, Cyprus and kills its three Israeli occupants. An elite section of the PLO known as Force 17 claims responsibility for the attack.
- 7 October – The Italian cruise ship MS Achille Lauro is hijacked in the Mediterranean Sea by Palestinian Arab militants. The hijackers' original aim was to use the ship to slip into Israel. However, crew members discover them cleaning weapons, and the group then seizes control of the ship; holding the passengers and crew hostage, they direct the vessel to sail to Tartus, Syria, and demand the release of 50 Palestinian Arabs then in Israeli prisons. During the incident, the militants kill the passenger Leon Klinghoffer, a 69-year-old wheelchair-using Jewish American, and throw him overboard.
- 27 December – Palestinian Arab militants from Abu Nidal's militant group open fire at the counters of El Al in the airports of Rome and Vienna. 18 Israelis were killed and 40 were injured.

Notable Israeli military operations against Palestinian militancy targets
The most prominent Israeli military counter-terrorism operations (military campaigns and military operations) carried out against Palestinian militants during 1985 include:

- 4 August – Defence Minister Rabin launches an Iron Fist policy in West Bank.
- 1 October – After three Israeli civilians were killed on board a yacht off the coast of Cyprus by the PLO's Force 17, the Israeli Air Force carried out Operation Wooden Leg, striking the PLO base in Tunis and killing 60 PLO members.

=== Unknown dates ===
- The founding of the West Bank settlement of Oranit.
- The founding of the community settlement Shaharut.

== Notable births ==
- 1 April – Shay Doron, Israeli basketball player.
- 4 April – Dudi Sela, Israeli tennis player.
- 30 April – Gal Gadot, Israeli actress and model.
- 4 June – Bar Refaeli, Israeli model.
- 5 August – Gil Vermouth, Israeli professional footballer

== Notable deaths ==
- 18 January – Mordechai Bentov (born 1900), Russian (Poland)-born Israeli journalist and politician.
- 31 January – Menachem Bader (born 1895), Austro-Hungarian (Galicia)-born Haganah member and Israeli politician.
- 24 April – Yitzhak Kahan (born 1913), Austro-Hungarian (Galicia)-born Israeli jurist, sixth President of the Supreme Court of Israel.
- 29 September – Yona Wallach (born 1944), Israeli poet.
- 6 October – Noah Moses (born 1912), publisher and editor of Yedioth Ahronoth.
- 7 December – Shlomo Rosen (born 1905), Austro-Hungarian (Austrian Silesia)-born Israeli politician and minister.
- 30 November – Joseph Zaritsky (born 1891), Russian (Ukraine)-born Israeli painter.
- Full date unknown
  - Benjamin Akzin (born 1904), Russian (Latvia)-born early Zionist activist and Israeli university professor.
  - Moshe Rudolf Bloch (b 1902), German-born Israeli scientist.
  - Moshe Rachmilewitz (born 1898), Russian (Belarus)-born leading Israeli doctor.
  - Eliezer Smoli (born 1901), Russian (Ukraine)-born Israeli writer, famous for his children's books.

== See also ==
- 1985 in Israeli film
- 1985 in Israeli television
- 1985 in Israeli music
- 1985 in Israeli sport
- Israel in the Eurovision Song Contest 1985
