= 1986 in Israel =

- Decades: 1960s; 1970s; 1980s; 1990s; 2000s
- See also: History of Israel; Timeline of Israeli history; List of years in Israel

These are the collective events from the 20th century in the year 1986 in Israel. With former leaders and development to the Asian states.

== Incumbents ==
- President of Israel – Chaim Herzog
- Prime Minister of Israel – Shimon Peres (Alignment) until 20 October, Yitzhak Shamir (Likud)
- President of the Supreme Court – Meir Shamgar
- Chief of General Staff – Moshe Levi
- Government of Israel – 21st Government of Israel until 20 October, 22nd Government of Israel

== Events ==
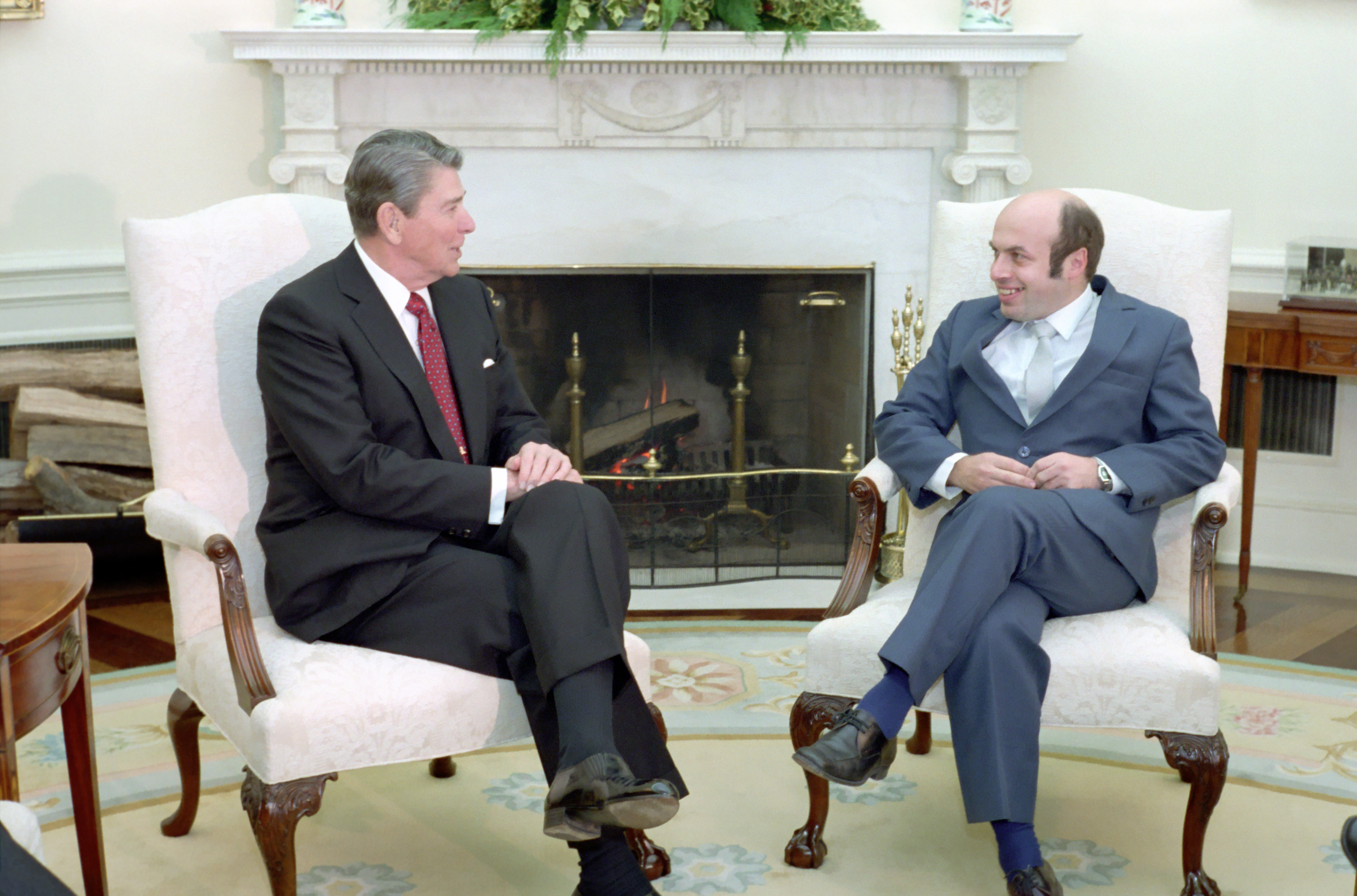
Ronald Reagan and Natan Sharansky, 10 December 1986

- 1 January – The New Israeli shekel (NIS) replaces the old shekel as Israel's official currency.
- 4 February – Israeli jet fighters intercept a Libyan civil aircraft over Cyprus and force it to land in Israel.
- 11 February – After a period of imprisonment of nine years in a Siberian labor camp, the Soviet-Jewish refusenik and human rights advocate Natan Sharansky and three low-level Western spies are exchanged for Czech spies held in the US, a Soviet spy, a Polish spy and a GDR spy (the latter three held in Western Germany). Sharansky subsequently emigrates to Israel.
- 16 April – Bejski Commission publishes its report.
- 3 May – Moti Giladi and Sarah Tzuriel represent Israel at the Eurovision Song Contest with the song “Yavo Yom” ("A Day will Come").
- 4 June – Jonathan Pollard pleads guilty to espionage for selling top secret United States military intelligence to Israel.
- 30 September – Israeli Mossad agent Cheryl Bentov who befriended Israeli nuclear weapons whistleblower Mordechai Vanunu persuades him to fly to Rome with her on a holiday. Once in Rome, Mossad agents overpower and drug him and carry him to a waiting ship off the coast, which takes him to Israel.
- 5 October – Israeli secret nuclear weapons are revealed by the British newspaper; The Sunday Times, which publishes an interview with Mordechai Vanunu, a former Israeli nuclear technician who revealed details of the program.
- 16 October – An Israeli F-4 Phantom, piloted by Yishai Aviram, is inadvertently damaged midair and abandoned, resulting in the capture of flight navigator then-Captain Ron Arad by Amal, the Lebanese Shi'ite militia. To this day, the whereabouts of Arad has not been disclosed by his captors.
- 20 October – The twenty-first government is replaced by the twenty-second government, when Yitzhak Shamir replaces Peres as Prime Minister in accordance with the rotation agreement between the Alignment and Likud.
- 23 October – The beginning of experimental broadcasts of the Israeli Channel 2.
- 19 December: Carmelit metro shut down for intensive renovation to be reopened in 1992.

=== Israeli–Palestinian conflict ===
The most prominent events related to the Israeli–Palestinian conflict which occurred during 1986 include:

Notable Palestinian militant operations against Israeli targets

The most prominent Palestinian militant acts and operations committed against Israeli targets during 1986 include:

- 17 April – Hindawi affair: An attempt to bomb an El Al flight from London to Tel Aviv is foiled.
- 6–22 September Turkish Jews were killed by Palestinian terrorists belonging to the Abu Nidal Organization while attending service at the Neve Shalom Synagogue.

Notable Israeli military operations against Palestinian militancy targets

The most prominent Israeli military counter-terrorism operations (military campaigns and military operations) carried out against Palestinian militants during 1986 include:

=== known dates ===
- The founding of the community settlement Eshhar founded in 1986.
- The founding of the community settlement Kokhav Ya'ir founded in 1986.

== Notable births ==
- 7 January – Daphne Leef, Israeli activist who is the initiator of the 2011 housing protests in Israel.
- 24 January – Raviv Ullman, Israeli-born American actor.
- 8 February – Agam Rodberg, Israeli model and actress.
- 3 March – Michael Moshonov, Israeli actor.
- 10 March – Roni Duani, Israeli pop singer, actress, TV host, and model.
- 4 June – Yahav Winner, Israeli director and murder victim. (d. 2023)
- 11 June – Nicol Raidman, Israeli philanthropist
- Israeli philanthropist28 August – Gilad Shalit, Israeli soldier held as a hostage.
- 1 September – Shahar Tzuberi, Israeli windsurfer and Olympic bronze medalist.
- 19 November – Hovi Star, Israeli musical artist

== Notable deaths ==
- 8 February – Yisrael Galili (born 1911), Russian (Ukraine)-born Israeli politician.
- 29 July – Dan Pagis (born 1930), Romanian (Bukovina)-born Israeli poet, lecturer and holocaust survivor.

== See also ==
- 1986 in Israeli film
- Israel in the Eurovision Song Contest 1986
