= 1984 in Israel =

- Decades: 1960s; 1970s; 1980s; 1990s; 2000s
- See also: History of Israel; Timeline of Israeli history; List of years in Israel

Events in the year 1984 in Israel.

== Incumbents ==
- President of Israel – Chaim Herzog
- Prime Minister of Israel – Yitzhak Shamir (Likud) until 13 September, Shimon Peres (Alignment)
- President of the Supreme Court – Meir Shamgar
- Chief of General Staff – Moshe Levi
- Government of Israel – 20th Government of Israel until 13 September, 21st Government of Israel

== Events ==
- 23 July – The Israeli legislative election ends. The Alignment party wins a narrow victory, again becoming the largest party in the Knesset, but cannot form a government with any of the smaller parties. As a result, a national unity government with Likud is established. It is agreed that Alignment leader Shimon Peres and Likud leader Yitzhak Shamir will each hold the post of prime minister for two years.
- 13 September – Shimon Peres presents the Twenty-first government of Israel and begins to serve as prime minister.
- 21 November – The first immigrants in Operation Moses arrive from Ethiopia.
- 12–13 April – The Kav 300 affair:
- 12 April – Four Palestinian Arab terrorists hijack an Israeli Egged bus number 300 and hold hostage approximately 40 passengers.
- 13 April – During an Israeli rescue operation on bus number 300 which had been hijacked the day before, one hostage and two terrorists are killed. Two other terrorists, who are taken off the bus alive, are killed by members of the Shin Bet.
- 6 August – Israeli soldier Moshe Tamam is abducted by a terrorist cell composed of Israeli-Arabs. He is later murdered. His attackers are arrested and (in 1986) sentenced to life.
- 19 October – Two terrorists attempt to infiltrate Israel by sea in an inflatable boat. An Israeli patrol boat intercepts them, and in an exchange of fire, the boat is sunk and two Israeli military personnel are injured.
- 22 October – A terrorist kills two students at the Cremisan Monasterey in Jerusalem.
- 29 November – A female Israeli soldier, Hadas Kadmi, goes missing; her body would be found two weeks later. Police conclude that she was abducted by terrorists who planned to use her as a bargaining chip to free Palestinian prisoners in Israel. As a result of her abduction, a new directive is issued prohibiting soldiers from hitchhiking at night.

== Notable births ==
- 7 January – Ran Danker, Israeli actor, singer, and model.
- 11 January – Oshri Cohen, Israeli actor.
- 24 January – Yotam Halperin, Israeli basketball player.
- 4 March – Tamir Cohen, Israeli footballer.
- 10 May – Pe'er Tasi, Israeli singer.
- 31 May – Yael Grobglas, French-born Israeli actress
- 9 July – Amir Shurush, Arab-Israeli actor and comedian
- 27 November – Adi Himmelbleu, Israeli actress, model and TV host.

== Notable deaths ==
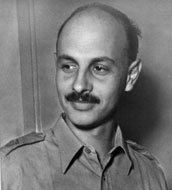
Yigael Yadin

- 8 January – Rabbi Yisrael Abuhatzeira (born 1890), AKA the "Baba Sali", Moroccan-born Israeli rabbi and kabbalist.
- 14 January – Paul Ben-Haim (born 1897) – German-born Israeli composer.
- 19 February – David Hacohen (born 1898), Russian (Belarus)-born Israeli politician.
- 1 April – Zelda (born 1914), Russian (Ukraine)-born Israeli poet.
- 21 April – Marcel Janco (born 1895), Romanian-born Israeli painter and architect.
- 9 May – Miriam Yalan-Shteklis (born 1900), Russian (Ukraine)-born Israeli writer and poet famous for her children's books.
- 28 June – Yigael Yadin (born 1917), Israeli archeologist, politician and military chief of staff.
- 1 July – Moshé Feldenkrais (born 1904), Russian (Ukraine)-born Israeli physicist and the founder of the Feldenkrais Method.
- 24 July – Arieh Sharon (born 1900), Austro-Hungarian (Galicia)-born Israeli architect.
- 8 August – Avraham Even-Shoshan (born 1905), Russian (Belarus)-born Israeli linguist and Hebrew lexicographer.
- 8 August – Ben-Zion Keshet (born 1914), Russian (Latvia)-born Israeli politician.

== See also ==
- 1984 in Israeli film
- Israel at the 1984 Summer Olympics
