= 1987 in Israel =

- Decades: 1960s; 1970s; 1980s; 1990s; 2000s
- See also: History of Israel; Timeline of Israeli history; List of years in Israel

Events in the year 1987 in Israel.

== Incumbents ==
- President of Israel – Chaim Herzog
- Prime Minister of Israel – Yitzhak Shamir (Likud)
- President of the Supreme Court – Meir Shamgar
- Chief of General Staff – Moshe Levi until 19 April, Dan Shomron
- Government of Israel – 22nd Government of Israel

== Events ==
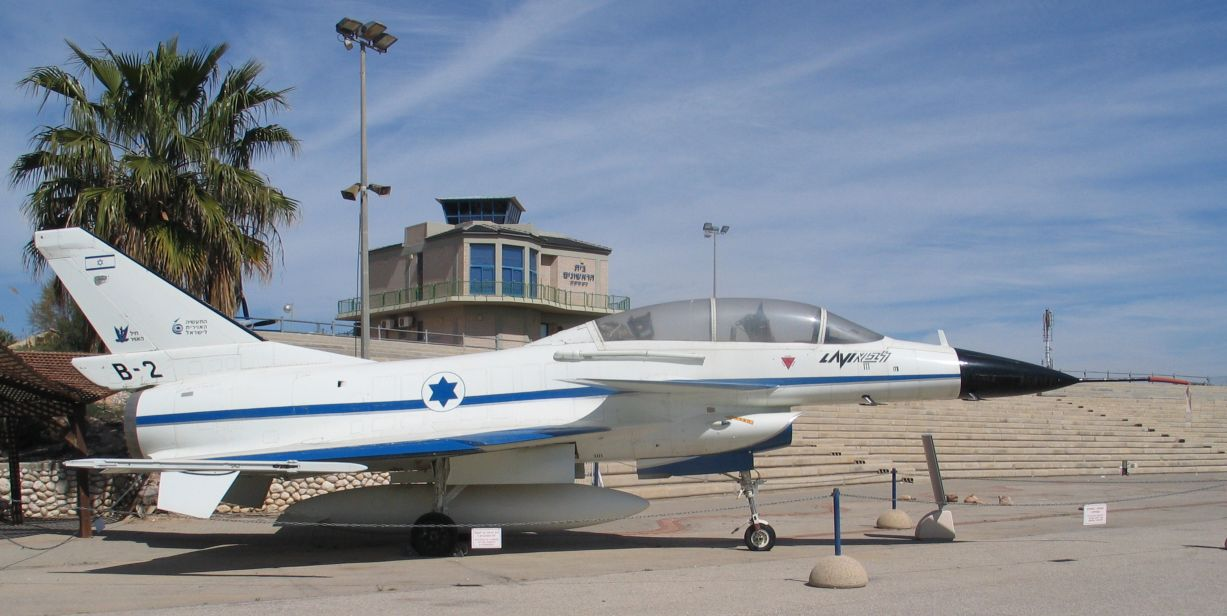
The IAI Lavi programme is cancelled

- 11 April – King Hussein of Jordan and the Israeli Foreign Minister Shimon Peres sign the "London Agreement" during a secret meeting held at the residence of Lord Mishcon in London.
- 19 April – Dan Shomron is appointed as the 13th Chief of Staff of the Israel Defense Forces.
- 9 May – Avi Kushnir and Natan Datner represent Israel at the Eurovision Song Contest with the song “Shir Habatlanim” ("The Bum’s Song"), achieving eighth place.
- 30 August – Israel's government cancels the IAI Lavi programme.
- 30 August – Landau Commission publishes its report.
- 25 November – Leading Israeli singer Zohar Argov commits suicide in his jail cell following his arrest on rape charges.

=== Israeli–Palestinian conflict ===
The most prominent events related to the Israeli–Palestinian conflict which occurred during 1987 include:

- 8 December – Israeli truck driver collides with two taxis carrying workers returning from work in Israel. Four Palestinian from the refugee camp Jabalia in the Gaza Strip are killed in the incident. A rumor which spread among Palestinians that the crash was deliberate and made in retaliation for the murder of an Israeli businessman in Gaza City two days earlier, sparks the First Intifada the next day.
- 9 December – Israeli–Palestinian conflict: First Intifada begins. Violence, riots, general strikes, and civil disobedience campaigns by Palestinian Arabs spread across the West Bank and Gaza Strip. Israeli forces respond with tear gas, plastic bullets, and live ammunition.
- 15 December – In a controversial move and amid Arab protests, Israeli Trade and Industry Minister Ariel Sharon entertained many prominent Israeli figures in a housewarming party in an apartment he rented in the Muslim Quarter of Jerusalem's Old City. The apartment was used by Sharon during his visits in the city while his permanent home was and remained in a ranch in southern Israel.

Notable Palestinian militant operations against Israeli targets

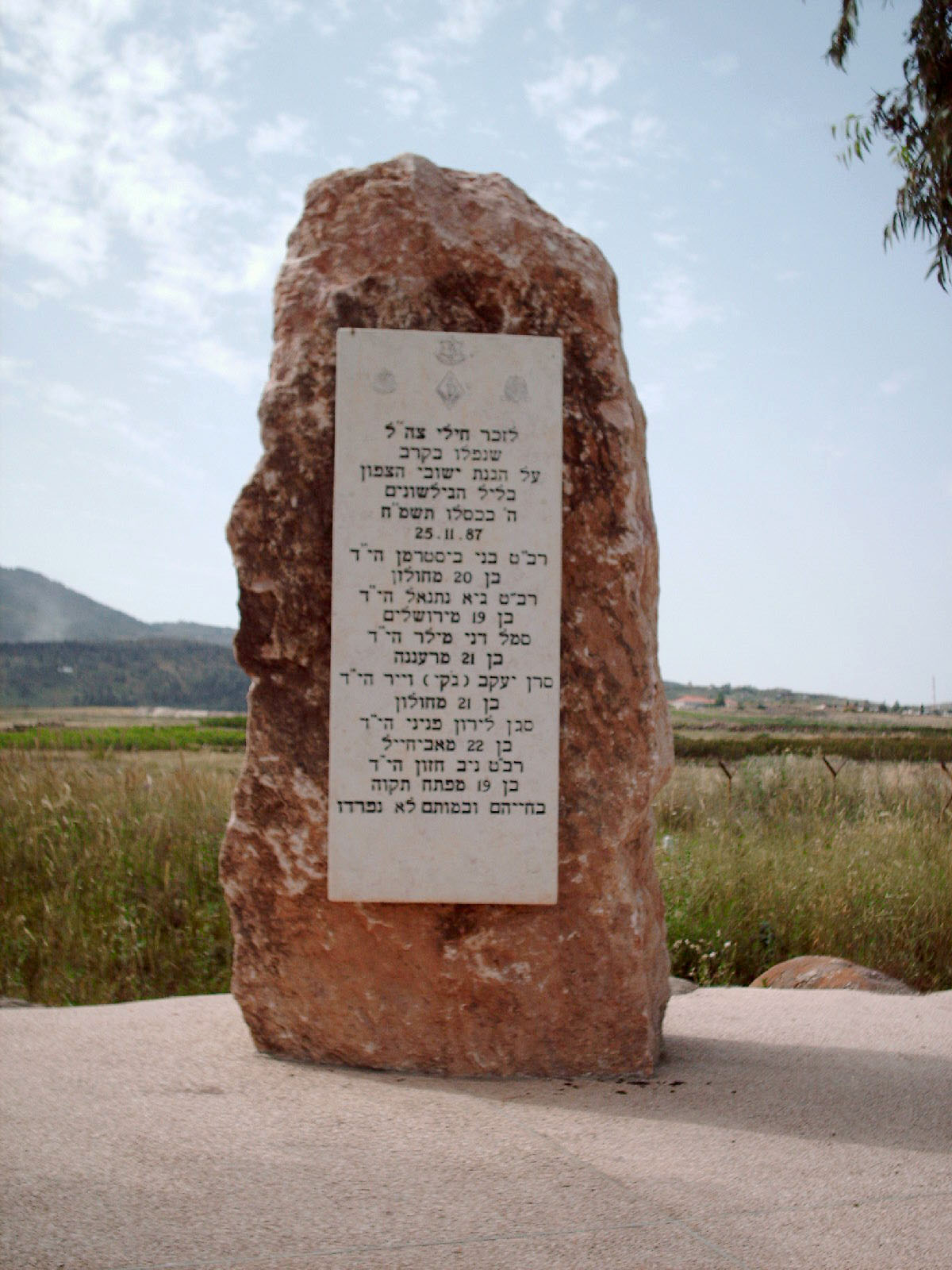
The memorial for the victims of the Night of the Gliders.

The most prominent Palestinian Arab terror attacks committed against Israeli targets during 1987 include:

- 25 November – Night of the Gliders: Two Palestinian Arab militant guerillas infiltrate into Israel from South Lebanon using hang gliders to launch a surprise attack against IDF soldiers. One of the gliders lands in the security zone, and the guerilla is later tracked down and killed by Israeli troops. The second manages to land in a field east of Kiryat Shmona, near the "Gibor" helipad, and succeeds in killing six soldiers and wounding eight before he was shot and killed by an Israeli officer who had been wounded.
- 6 December – The Israeli businessman Shlomo Takal is stabbed to death at the main shopping square in Gaza City.

Notable Israeli military operations against Palestinian militancy targets
The most prominent Israeli military counter-terrorism operations (military campaigns and military operations) carried out against Palestinian militants during 1987 include:

- 5 September – Four Israeli warplanes bomb three PLO guerrilla bases on the outskirts of the Palestinian refugee camp Ain al-Hilweh in Lebanon. Up to 41 people are reported killed in the incident. An IDF spokesman stated that the targets bombed were being used by terrorist cells that were planning raids against Israeli targets.
- 8 October – During a shootout that took place between Israeli security forces and four armed Islamic Jihad guerrillas in the Gaza Strip, all four guerrillas are killed, as well as one Shin Bet officer.

=== Unknown dates ===
- The founding of the community settlement Avtalion.
- The founding of the communal settlement Nofit.
- Anim ancient synagogue discovered in the Yatir Forest.

== Notable births ==
- 23 April – Boaz Ma'uda, Israeli singer-songwriter
- 25 July – Eran Zahavi, Israeli footballer
- 1 May – Shahar Pe'er, Israeli professional tennis player.
- 15 December – Marina Maximilian Blumin, singer-songwriter and actress
- 21 December – Michael Lewis, Israeli model, basketball player and actor.

== Notable deaths ==
- 23 January – Uriel Ofek (born 1926), Israeli children's writer.
- 27 March – Gurit Kadman (born 1897), German-born Israeli dance instructor and choreographer.
- 24 April – Meir Ya'ari (born 1897), Austro-Hungarian (Galicia)-born Israeli politician, educator and social activist.
- 29 June – Shmuel Tamir (born 1923), Israeli politician.
- 11 July – Avi Ran (born 1963), Israeli footballer (goalkeeper).
- 17 August – Shaike Ophir (born 1929), Israeli film actor and comedian.
- 25 September – Abba Kovner (born 1918), Russian (Crimea)-born Israeli-Lithuanian poet, writer and partisan leader.
- 25 October – Louis Guttman (born 1916), U.S.-born Israeli university professor.
- 25 November – Zohar Argov (born 1955), popular Israeli singer in the Mizrahi style.

== See also ==
- 1987 in Israeli film
- 1987 in Israeli television
- 1987 in Israeli music
- 1987 in Israeli sport
- Israel in the Eurovision Song Contest 1987
