= 1988 in Israel =

- Decades: 1960s; 1970s; 1980s; 1990s; 2000s
- See also: History of Israel; Timeline of Israeli history; List of years in Israel

Events in the year 1988 in Israel.

== Incumbents ==
- President of Israel – Chaim Herzog
- Prime Minister of Israel – Yitzhak Shamir (Likud)
- President of the Supreme Court – Meir Shamgar
- Chief of General Staff – Dan Shomron
- Government of Israel – 22nd Government of Israel until 22 December, 23rd Government of Israel

== Events ==
- 6 January – Michel Sabbah is consecrated as Roman Catholic Bishop of Jerusalem becoming the first Palestinian Arab to hold this position.
- 15 January – In Jerusalem, police and Palestinian protestors clash at the Dome of the Rock; several police and at least 70 Palestinians are injured.
- 17 January – Education Minister Yitzhaq Navon orders the mobilisation of high school students to assist in the citrus fruit harvest in a crisis caused by the absence of Palestinian Arab workers.
- 18 February – Israeli authorities close Tari al-Sharara a Hebrew/Arabic newspaper published in Israel.
- 25 February – A camera crew working for a US network film four Israeli soldiers breaking arms of two bound Palestinian Arabs. On 15 March the IDF announced that one of the soldiers had been sentenced to 21 days in prison, a second to ten days.
- 13 March – An estimated 200,000-250,000 Israelis demonstrate in support of Prime Minister Shamir's rejection of US peace proposals. The day before, 12 March, Peace Now held a demonstration of 50,000 in favour of the plan.
- 24 March – An Israeli court sentences Mordechai Vanunu to 18 years in prison for disclosing Israel's nuclear weapons program to The Sunday Times.
- 25 April – In Israel, Ivan Demjanjuk is sentenced to death for war crimes committed in World War II. He was accused by survivors of being the notorious guard at the Treblinka extermination camp known as "Ivan the Terrible". The conviction was eventually overturned in 1993 by the Israeli Supreme Court.
- 30 April – Yardena Arazi represents Israel at the Eurovision Song Contest with the song “Ben Adam” ("Human Being"), achieving seventh place.
- 18 June – UK government expels Israeli diplomat and orders end of Mossad activities in UK following the killing of Naji al-Ali.
- 16 August – Two prisoners are killed when 1,000 Palestinian Arab detainees riot at Ktzi'ot Prison.
- 19 September – Israel launches Ofek-1, its first reconnaissance satellite, into space.
- 30 October – Jericho bus firebombing: Five Israelis are killed and five wounded in a Palestinian attack in the West Bank.
- 1 November – In the Israeli election, Likud wins 47 seats, Labour wins 49, but Likud Prime Minister Yitzhak Shamir remains in office.
- 22 December – Yitzhak Shamir presents his cabinet for a Knesset "Vote of Confidence". The 23rd Government is approved that day and the members are sworn in.

=== Israeli–Palestinian conflict ===
The most prominent events related to the Israeli–Palestinian conflict which occurred during 1988 include:

- 6 April – A 15-year-old Israeli girl is killed in the Palestinian village of Bayta in West Bank. First official announcements state that she had been stoned to death. A subsequent IDF investigation revealed that she had been accidentally shot by her group leader. Two Palestinian Arabs are killed in the incident.
- 7 December – Yasser Arafat recognizes the right of Israel to exist.

Notable Palestinian militant operations against Israeli targets

The most prominent Palestinian Arab terror attacks committed against Israelis during 1988 include:

- 7 March – Mothers' Bus attack: A squad of three Palestinian Arab militants, members of the Fatah organization, infiltrated Israel from Egypt. The militants hijacked a bus full of women returning from work at the Negev Nuclear Research Center near Dimona and threatened to kill the passengers one by one if Israel would not release Palestinian prisoners from Israeli prisons. After the militants executed one of the passengers, members of the elite civilian counter-terrorism unit Yamam broke into the bus, killing all three hijackers, but not managing to prevent another two Israeli passengers from being killed. See Mothers' Bus attack.
- 11 May – A car bomb near the Israeli Embassy in Nicosia, Cyprus, kills three and injures 15. A caller claims that the Abu Nidal organization carried out the attack.

Notable Israeli military operations against Palestinian militancy targets

The most prominent Israeli military counter-terrorism operations (military campaigns and military operations) carried out against Palestinian militants during 1988 include:

- 2 January – Israeli helicopters and fighter jets attack Palestinian targets in South Lebanon killing at least 19, wounding 14.
- 11 January – The Israeli army declares the Gaza Strip a closed military zone and imposes curfews on Khan Yunis, Dayr al-Balah, Maghazi, Nusyrat and Burayj refugee camps.
- 13 January – All refugee camps in the West Bank and Gaza Strip are put under curfew.
- 19 January – With 38 Palestinians killed since 9 December, Defense Minister Yitzhaq Rabin announces a new policy using "might, power and beating" to quell demonstrations. A month later a team of US physicians estimated that over 1,000 Palestinians had suffered broken bones and other injuries. In the same period three Palestinians had been beaten to death by members of the Israeli armed forces.
- 14 February – A bomb kills three PLO officials in Limassol, Cyprus.
- 23 March – The IAF rockets Palestinian targets in South Lebanon killing or wounding fifteen. A second raid the following day kills or injures five.
- 30 March – The Israeli High Court upholds an Israeli army order banning the international media from the West Bank.
- 12 April – Israeli army Deputy Chief of Staff, Ehud Barak, announces that army reserve duty will be extended from 40 to 62 days. A day earlier he had said that there were 4,800 Palestinian activists being held in Israeli prisons, 900 of them under administrative detention.
- 16 April – Abu Jihad is assassinated in his Tunis home, allegedly by an Israeli commando unit. His driver and two bodyguards are also killed. In demonstrations that follow in the West Bank and Gaza Strip at least fourteen Palestinian are killed by Israeli army gunfire.
- 2 May – The Israeli government announces it will begin cutting water and electricity to towns in the West Bank and Gaza Strip that do not pay their bills.
- 4 May – Operation Law and Order. Between 1,500 and 2,000 Israeli soldiers kill 40 Hizbullah fighters around the Lebanese village of Meidoun in a two-day offensive. Three Israeli soldiers are killed and 17 wounded.
- 9 December – Operation Blue and Brown. A failed commando raid on a Palestinian base near Na'ameh, 10km South of Beirut, in which the commanding officer was killed.

=== Unknown dates ===
- The founding of the West Bank settlement of Beitar Illit.
- The founding of the community settlement Givat Ela.
- The founding of the moshav Kmehin.

== Notable births ==
- 2 February – Eliyahu Asheri, Israeli civilian kidnapped and murdered by Palestinian Arab terrorists (died 2006).
- 29 February – Nadav Ben Yehuda, mountaineer and SAR specialist
- 2 May – Beram Kayal, footballer
- 11 May – Eliad Cohen, producer, actor, model and entrepreneur
- 22 June – Omri Casspi, the first Israeli basketball player in the NBA.

== Notable deaths ==
- 18 August – Ernst Simon (born 1899), German-born Israeli Jewish educator, and religious philosopher.
- 27 October – Michael Reisser (born 1946), Israeli politician.
- 2 November – Menachem Savidor (born 1946), Russian (Ukraine)-born Israeli civil servant and politician.

== See also ==
- 1988 in Israeli film
- 1988 in Israeli television
- 1988 in Israeli music
- 1988 in Israeli sport
- Israel in the Eurovision Song Contest 1988
- Israel at the 1988 Summer Olympics
