= Tabac =

Tabac may refer to:

- the French word for Tobacco
- Tabac (perfume), a cologne that was created by Mäurer & Wirtz in 1959
- Tabac (store), a store licensed to sell tobacco products in France
- the Tabac corner at the Circuit de Monaco, the venue for the Monaco Grand Prix

== People with the surname ==
- Yoni Tabac (born 1980), Israeli actor
