= 1980 in Israel =

- Decades: 1960s; 1970s; 1980s; 1990s; 2000s
- See also: History of Israel; Timeline of Israeli history; List of years in Israel

Events in the year 1980 in Israel.

== Incumbents ==
- President of Israel – Yitzhak Navon
- Prime Minister of Israel – Menachem Begin (Likud)
- President of the Supreme Court – Yoel Zussman, Moshe Landau
- Chief of General Staff – Rafael Eitan
- Government of Israel – 18th Government of Israel

== Events ==
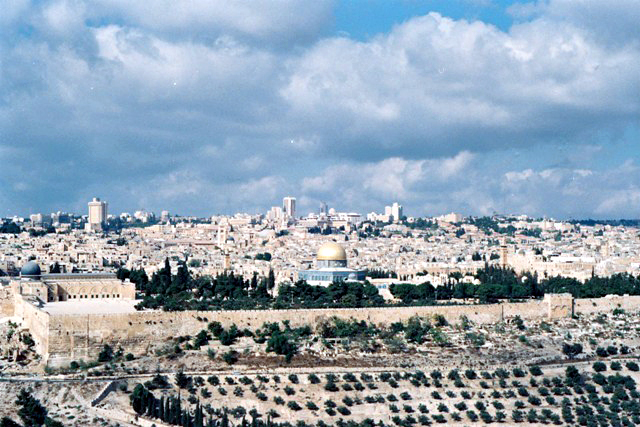
Israel's Knesset passes the Jerusalem Law

- 26 January – Israel and Egypt establish diplomatic relations.
- 24 February – The shekel replaces the Israeli pound.
- 30 July – Israel's Knesset passes the Jerusalem Law.

=== Israeli–Palestinian conflict ===
The most prominent events related to the Israeli–Palestinian conflict which occurred during 1980 include:

Notable Palestinian militant operations against Israeli targets

The most prominent Palestinian Arab terror attacks committed against Israelis during 1980 include:

- 7 April – Misgav Am hostage crisis - Five Palestinian Arab from the Iraqi-backed Arab Liberation Front penetrate kibbutz Misgav Am in the night and enter the kibbutz nursery. They kill the kibbutz secretary and an infant boy. They then hold the rest of the children as hostages, demanding the release of about 50 person held in Israeli prisons. The first raid of an IDF infantry unit is unsuccessful, but a second attempt, a few hours later, succeeds, and all the people are killed. Two kibbutz members and one soldier are killed, four children and 11 soldiers are wounded.

Notable Israeli military operations against Palestinian militancy targets

The most prominent Israeli military counter-terrorism operations (military campaigns and military operations) carried out against Palestinian militants during 1980 include:

=== Unknown dates ===
- The founding of the moshav Idan.

== Notable births ==
- 29 January – Yael Bar-Zohar, Israeli model and actress.
- 17 February – Linor Abargil, Israeli model and actress who won the Miss World 1998 title.
- 19 February – Tal Burstein, Israeli basketball player.
- 20 March – Netta Garti, Israeli actress.
- 23 March – Asaf Avidan, musician
- 10 April – Andy Ram, Israeli tennis player
- 21 April – Yoni Tabac, actor
- 5 May – Yossi Benayoun, Israeli footballer.
- 13 October – Hilla Nachshon, Israeli TV host, actress and model.

== Notable deaths ==
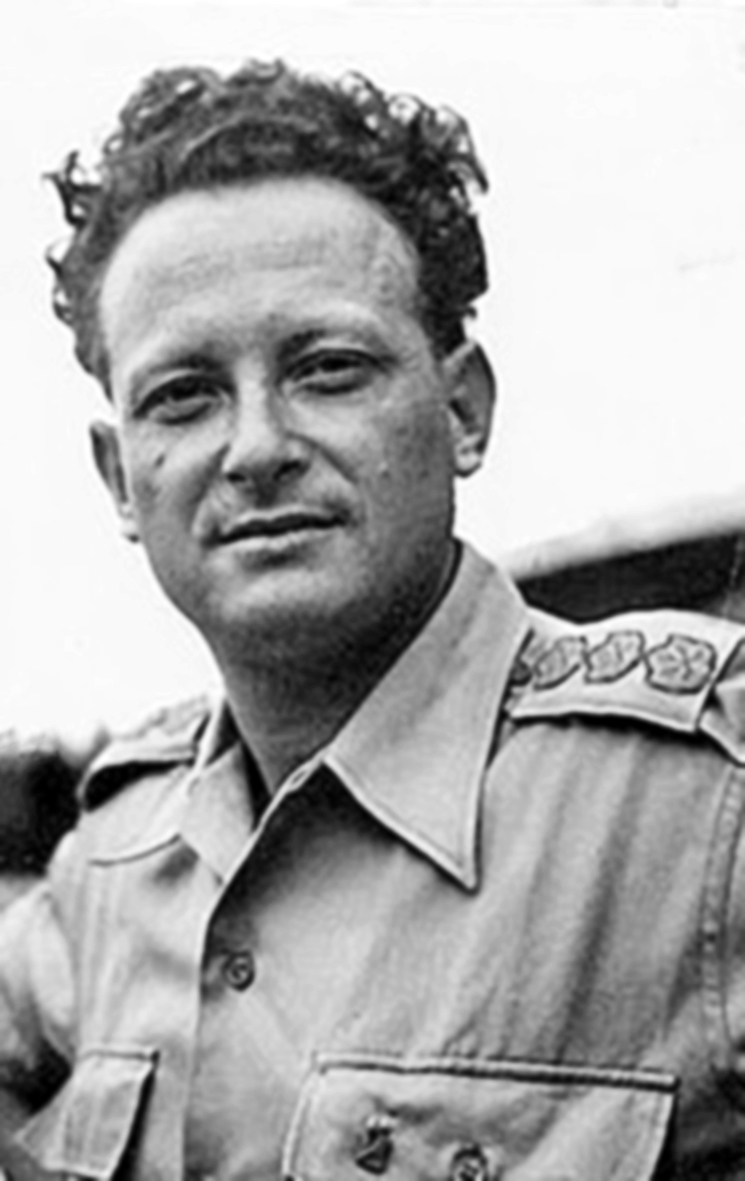
Yigal Allon

- 7 January – Dov Yosef (born 1899), Canadian-born Israeli politician and statesman.
- 22 January – Yitzhak Baer (born 1888), German-born Israeli historian and an expert in medieval Spanish Jewish history.
- 3 February – Hanna Rovina (born 1892), Russian (Belarus)-born Israeli actress, recognised as the original "First Lady of Hebrew Theatre".
- 19 February – Nathan Yellin-Mor (born 1913), Russian (Belarus)-born Revisionist Zionist activist, Lehi leader and Israeli politician.
- 29 February – Yigal Allon (born 1918), Israeli politician, a commander of the Palmach, and a general in the IDF.
- 8 May – Yitzhak Kanev (born 1896), Russian (Ukraine)-born Zionist activist and Israeli politician.
- 16 June – Jacob Talmon (born 1916), Russian (Poland)-born Israeli author and professor of modern history.
- 26 June - Akiva Govrin (born 1902), Russian (Ukraine)-born Israeli politician, first Minister of Tourism.
- 13 August - Ya'akov Mizrahi (born 1919), Israeli politician.
- 22 September - Zefania Carmel (born 1940), Iraqi-born Israeli yachting world champion.
- 28 November – Nachum Gutman (born 1898), Russian (Bessarabia)-born Israeli painter, sculptor and author.
- 19 December - Moshe Kelman (born 1923), Israeli military officer.

== See also ==
- 1980 in Israeli film
