= List of Israeli films of 1982 =

A list of films produced by the Israeli film industry in 1982.

== 1982 releases ==
=== Unknown premiere date ===
Premiere	Title	Director	Cast	Genre	Notes	Ref
?	Repeat Dive (Hebrew: צלילה חוזרת, romanized: Tzlila Chozeret)	Shimon Dotan	Doron Nesher, Batia Rosenthal	Drama	Entered into the 32nd Berlin International Film Festival	
?	Mitahat La'af (Hebrew: מתחת לאף, lit. "Under the nose")	Jacob Goldwasser	Uri Gavriel, Moshe Ivgy	Drama		
?	Noa at 17 (Hebrew: נועה בת 17, lit. "Noa at 17")	Itzhak Zepel Yeshurun	Dalia Shimko	Drama		
?	Ahava Rishonah (Hebrew: אהבה ראשונה, lit. "First Love")	Uzi Peres	Gila Almagor	Drama		
?	Adon Leon (Hebrew: אדון לאון, lit. "Mr. Leon")	Ze'ev Revach	Ze'ev Revach	Comedy		
?	Boy Meets Girl (Hebrew: בן לוקח בת)	Michal Bat-Adam	Einat Helfman	Drama		
?	Kvish L'Lo Motzah (Hebrew: כביש ללא מוצא, lit. "Dead End Street")	Yaky Yosha	Gila Almagor	Drama		
?	Melech LeYom Ehad (Hebrew: מלך ליום אחד, lit. "King for a Day")	Yaky Yosha	Gabi Amrani	Comedy		
?	Ahava Ilemeth (Hebrew: אהבה אילמת, lit. "Mute Love")	Joel Silberg	Shraga Harpaz, Asher Tzarfati	Drama		
?	Gabi Ben Yakar (Hebrew: גבי בן יקר, lit. "Gabi the dear son")	Uri Barbash	Moshe Ivgy	Drama		
?	Ot Kain (Hebrew: אות קיין, lit. "Mark of Cain")	Uri Barbash	Arnon Zadok, Dalik Volonitz, Ofra Weingarten	Drama		
?	Private Popsicle	Boaz Davidson	Yftach Katzur Zachi Noy Jonathan Sagall	Comedy		

== See also ==
- 1982 in Israel
