= Dvora Kedar =

Israeli actress (1924–2023)

- דבורה קידר
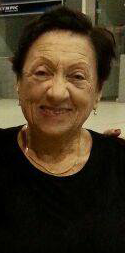
- Kedar in 2013
- Born: Devora Halter Keidar; 8 June 1924; Wilno, Poland (now Vilnius, Lithuania)
- Died: 17 May 2023 (aged 98); Tel Aviv
- Occupation: Actress
- Years active: 1961–2023
- Awards: Ophir Award

Devora Halter Keidar (Hebrew: דבורה הלטר קידר; 8 June 1924 – 17 May 2023) was an Israeli actress.

== Biography ==
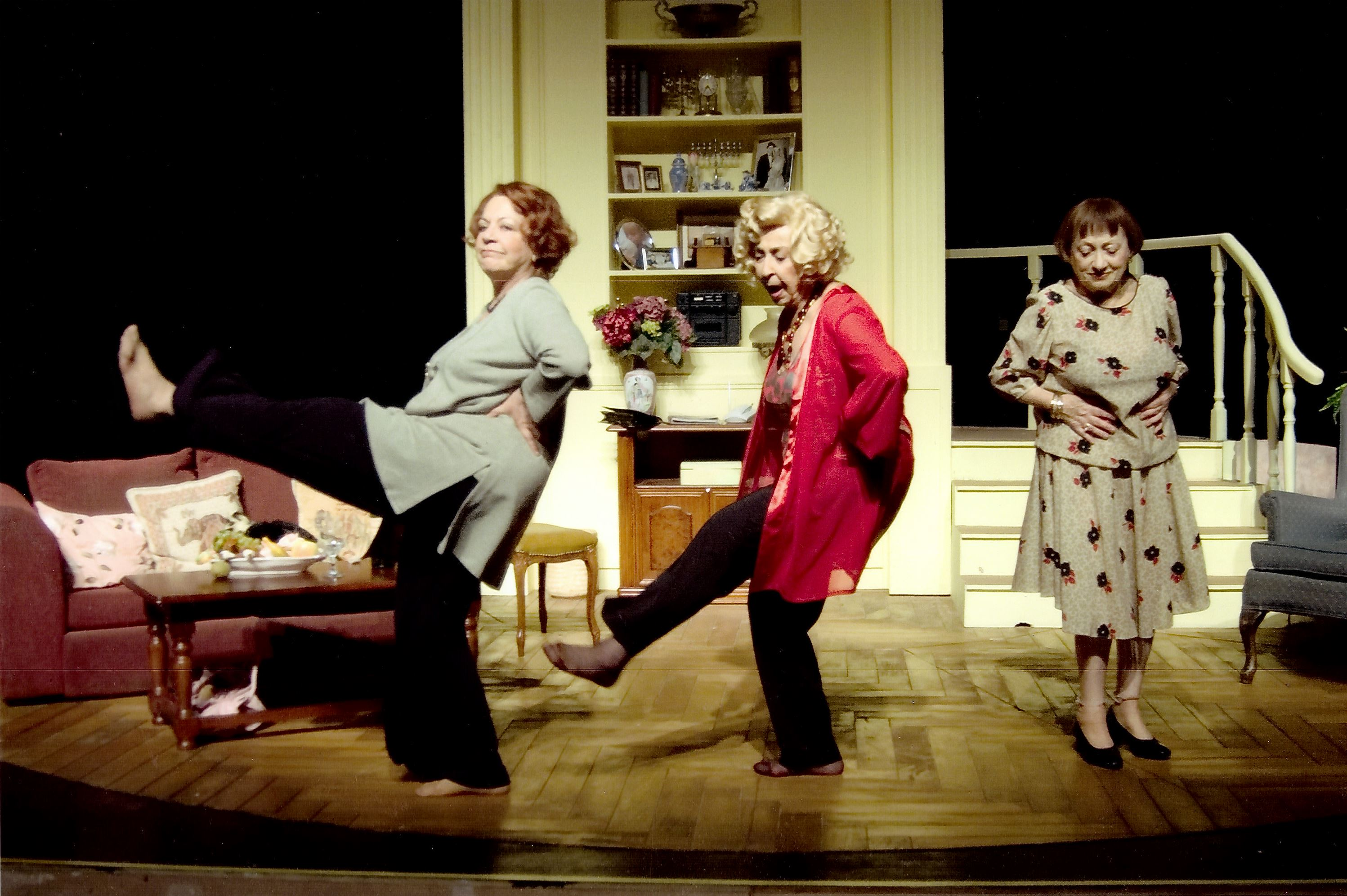
Kedar in The Cemetery Club

Dvora Kedar was born in present-day Lithuania, and made aliyah with her family one year later, in 1925. She began her acting career in Habima, Israel's National Theatre. In 1964, she appeared in her first movie, Ulai terdu sham. In 1977, she starred in Mivtza Yonatan (Operation Thunderbolt), and 1979 she appeared in Lemon Popsicle as Benji's mother. Nikmato Shel Itzik Finkelstein was her last movie, although she continued to act in Israeli theatre productions. She had two children and four grandchildren.

Kedar won the Ophir Award for Best Actress in a Supporting Role.

Kedar died on 17 May 2023, at the age of 98.

== Filmography ==
- Fire Birds (2015) - Mrs. Halperin
- Zaguri (TV Series 2014–2015) - Masuda
- Ha-Seret Shelanu (2005) - Benzi Mother
- Itche (TV Series 1994)
- The Revenge of Itzik Finkelstein (1993) - Mother
- Summertime Blues (1988) - Benjy's Mother
- Up Your Anchor (1985) - Sonja
- Baby Love (1983) - Sonja
- Private Popsicle (1982) - Sonja
- Hot Bubblegum (1981) - Sonja, Benjy's Mother
- Going Steady (1979) - Sonja
- Lemon Popsicle (1978) - Sonja
- Operation Thunderbolt (1977) - Freda Ben-David
- A Gift from Heaven (1973)
- The Dreamer (1970) - Mother
- The Prodigal Son (1968)
- Dreamboat (1963) - Mother
- One Hundred and One Dalmatians (1961) - Nanny (Israeli version)
