= 1981 in Israel =

- Decades: 1960s; 1970s; 1980s; 1990s; 2000s
- See also: History of Israel; Timeline of Israeli history; List of years in Israel

Events in the year 1981 in Israel.

== Incumbents ==
- President of Israel – Yitzhak Navon
- Prime Minister of Israel – Menachem Begin (Likud)
- President of the Supreme Court – Moshe Landau
- Chief of General Staff – Rafael Eitan
- Government of Israel – 18th Government of Israel until 5 August, 19th Government of Israel

== Events ==
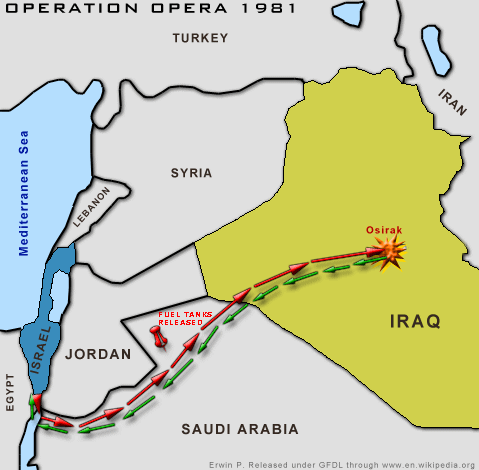
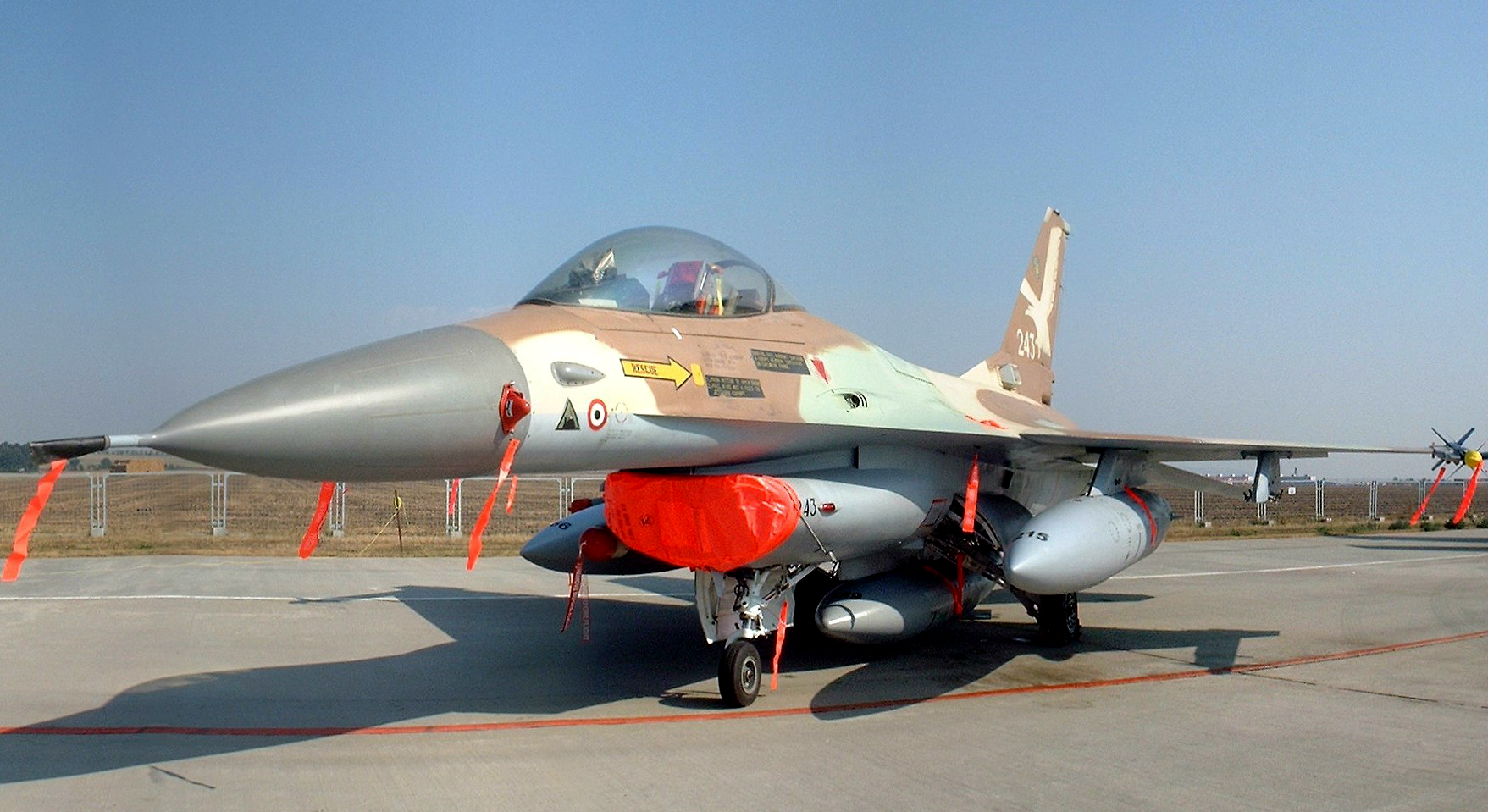
Operation Opera is carried out on 7 June 1981 in which the Israeli Air Force severely damaged Iraq's Osirak nuclear reactor under construction near Baghdad
- 4 April – Hakol Over Habibi represents Israel at the Eurovision Song Contest with the song “Halayla” ("Tonight"), achieving seventh place.
- 28 April – For the first time, Israel intervened directly in the war between Syria and Lebanese Christians, as Israeli jets shot down two Syrian helicopters, killing four crewmen. Israeli warplanes also bombed Syrian positions on Mount Sannine. Israel claimed that it was taking action to "spread a protective umbrella" over the Lebanese Christian militias. Additionally, Reagan sends ambassador Philip Habib to the Middle East to convince the Syrians to withdraw missiles.
- 7 June – Operation Opera: Eight Israeli F-16s, escorted by F-15s, attack and severely damage Osirak, an Iraqi nuclear reactor under construction near Baghdad, which Israeli military intelligence maintain was built by the regime of Saddam Hussein for the purpose of plutonium production to further an Iraqi nuclear weapons program. Israeli intelligence also believed that the summer of 1981 would be the last chance to destroy the reactor before it would be loaded with nuclear fuel.
- 19 June - In addition to demanding that Israel sign the Nuclear Nonproliferation Treaty and subject its own nuclear program to IAEA safeguards, the UN Security Council denounces Operation Opera as a breach of the UN charter and says that Iraq should receive compensation.
- 30 June – The Likud party led by Menachem Begin wins the 10th Israeli legislative elections.
- June - Operation Opera denounced by the Board of Governors of the International Atomic Energy Agency.
- 10 July - The PLO starts launching 130 mm artillery shells and Katyusha rockets at Israel's northern region. Although the Israeli Air Force (IAF) responded with airstrikes, these attacks were not ultimately stopped.
- 17 July - The IAF carries out a massive raid on PLO buildings. The terrorist group increases the intensity of its attacks on northern communities, forcing thousands of Israelis to relocate south or spend several days in shelters.
- 24 July - US ambassador Philip Habib mediates a ceasefire between the two camps to stop the violence from getting worse.
- July – The 1981 Maccabiah Games are held.
- 5 August – Menachem Begin presents his cabinet for a Knesset "Vote of Confidence". The 19th Government is approved that day, and the members are sworn in.
- September - The IAEA Conference suspends all technical assistance to Israel and denounces the strike as well.
- 30 November – The Memorandum of Understanding on Strategic Cooperation was signed by U.S. Secretary of Defense Caspar Weinberger and Israeli Defense Minister Ariel Sharon. The MOU lasted only 17 days and was suspended after Israel announced its annexation of the Golan Heights.
- November - The UN General Assembly denounced Israel for a deliberate act of aggression in Operation Opera.
- 14 December – The Knesset approves the "Golan Heights Law" which applies Israel's government and laws to the Golan Heights. The law was condemned internationally and declared null and void by United Nations Security Council Resolution 497.
- 18 December – Four days after Israel annexed the Golan Heights, the U.S. terminated its recently made Memorandum of Understanding (MOU) with Israel. The MOU was not reinstated until 17 May 1983.

=== Israeli–Palestinian conflict ===
The most prominent events related to the Israeli–Palestinian conflict, which occurred in 1981, include:

Notable Palestinian militant operations against Israeli targets

The most prominent Palestinian Arab terror attacks committed against Israelis during 1981 include:

- March - A terrorist infiltrating from Lebanon using a motorized hang glider manages to reach Haifa and drop some bombs over the city's bay but is arrested after his glider's motor runs out of fuel and is forced to land.
- 10 August – Palestinian terrorists threw two bombs at an Israeli embassy in Vienna, wounding a 75-year-old woman.
- 29 August – 1981 Vienna synagogue attack: Palestinian terrorists killed two people and wounded 30 attending a Bar Mitzvah in Vienna.

Notable Israeli military operations against Palestinian militancy targets

The most prominent Israeli military counter-terrorism operations (military campaigns and military operations) carried out against Palestinian militants during 1981 include:

- 10–24 July – The Israel Defense Forces began a regular bombardment of Palestine Liberation Organization strongholds in Lebanon. The siege escalated after the Palestinian guerillas began shelling Israeli settlements. Until a 24 July ceasefire, 450 Palestinians and Lebanese, and 6 Israelis, died
  - 17 July – Israeli bombing of Beirut: Aircraft from Israel bombed a residential area of West Beirut that housed PLO headquarters. Ten apartment buildings were destroyed, more than 300 people were killed, and 800 or more injured. Most were civilians.
  - 24 July – American mediator Philip Habib brokered a cease-fire between Israel and the PLO, temporarily halting the Lebanese Civil War.
- 1 August – Abu Daoud, the PLO militant who had overseen the 1972 massacre of Israeli athletes was shot five times at close range while sitting in the coffee shop of the Victoria Hotel in Warsaw.

=== Unknown dates ===
- The founding of the community settlement Barkan.
- The founding of the moshav Alonei HaBashan.
- The founding of the moshav Kalanit.
- The Old City of Jerusalem and its walls are designated by UNESCO as World Heritage Sites.

== Notable births ==
- 27 January – Yaniv Katan, Israeli footballer.
- 8 April – Ofer Shechter, Israeli actor, comedian, TV host and model.
- 17 May – Shiri Maimon, Israeli singer, actress and TV host.
- 9 June – Natalie Portman, Israeli-American actress.
- 8 August – Harel Skaat, Israeli singer.
- 11 August – Yoni Bloch, Israeli singer.
- 18 September – Lucy Aharish, Israeli journalist and actress
- date unknown - Oded Liphshitz, Israeli playwright

== Notable deaths ==
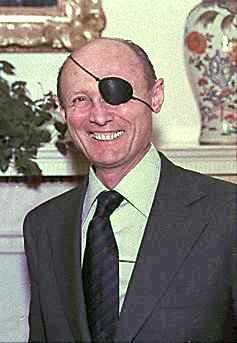
Moshe Dayan

- 12 January – Hamad Abu Rabia (born 1929), Bedouin Israeli politician, murdered.
- 11 February – Franz Sondheimer (born 1926), German-born Israeli-British chemist.
- 25 March – Yonatan Ratosh (born 1908), Russian (Poland)-born Israeli poet and the founder of the Canaanite movement.
- 8 May – Uri Zvi Grinberg (born 1896), Austro-Hungarian (Galicia)-born Israeli poet and journalist.
- 16 May – Ezra Dotan (born 1937), German-born Israeli fighter pilot.
- 20 May – Binyamin Arditi (born 1897), Austrian-born Israeli politician.
- 14 June – Haim Shirman (born 1904), Russian (Ukraine)-born Israeli scholar of medieval Spanish Jewish poetry.
- 17 June – Yitzhak Zuckerman (born 1915), Polish-born Israeli. One of the leaders of the Warsaw Ghetto Uprising during World War II.
- 16 October – Moshe Dayan (born 1915), Israeli general and politician.
- 9 December – Franz Ollendorff (born 1900), German-born Israeli physicist.

== See also ==
- 1981 in Israeli film
- 1981 in Israeli television
- 1981 in Israeli music
- 1981 in Israeli sport
- Israel in the Eurovision Song Contest 1981
