= 1982 in Israel =

- Decades: 1960s; 1970s; 1980s; 1990s; 2000s
- See also: History of Israel; Timeline of Israeli history; List of years in Israel

Events in the year 1982 in Israel.

== Incumbents ==
- President of Israel – Yitzhak Navon
- Prime Minister of Israel – Menachem Begin (Likud)
- President of the Supreme Court – Moshe Landau, Yitzhak Kahan
- Chief of General Staff – Rafael Eitan
- Government of Israel – 19th Government of Israel

== Events ==
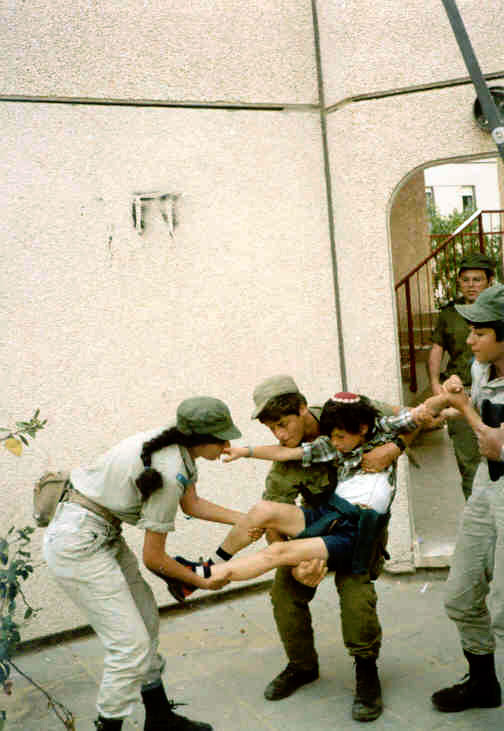
Israeli soldiers evacuating Yamit by force, April 1982

- 11 April – Israeli reservist Alan Harry Goodman targets the Dome of the Rock in a shooting that kills two Palestinians
- 19 April – The evacuation of the Israeli settlement Yamit in the Sinai Peninsula begins in accordance with the Egyptian–Israeli Peace Treaty.
- 24 April – Avi Toledano represents Israel at the Eurovision Song Contest with the song “Hora”, achieving second place.
- 25 April – Israel completes its withdrawal from the Sinai Peninsula in accordance with the Egyptian–Israeli Peace Treaty.
- 25 September – In Israel, 400,000 marchers demand the resignation of Prime Minister Menachem Begin in protest of the events of the Sabra and Shatila massacre.
- 11 November – Suicide attack on the IDF headquarters in Tyre. 76 Israeli soldiers and 27 Lebanese are killed in the blast.

=== Israeli–Palestinian conflict ===
The most prominent events related to the Israeli–Palestinian conflict which occurred during 1982 include:

Notable Palestinian militant operations against Israeli targets

The most prominent Palestinian terror attacks committed against Israelis during 1982 include:

- 3 June – Shlomo Argov, Israel's ambassador in London, is severely injured when shot at by Palestinian militant belonging to the Abu Nidal Organization. Argov's assassination attempt leads to the Operation Peace for Galilee. Argov eventually died of his injuries in 2003.
- 23 September – The Israeli Chargé d'affaires in Malta Esther Milo was wounded in an attempted kidnapping by Palestinian militants.
- 23 December – A bomb explodes at the Israeli Consulate in Sydney, wounding two Israeli officials.

Notable Israeli military operations against Palestinian militancy targets

The most prominent Israeli military counter-terrorism operations (military campaigns and military operations) carried out against Palestinian militants during 1982 include:

- Operation Peace for Galilee (June – September 1982)

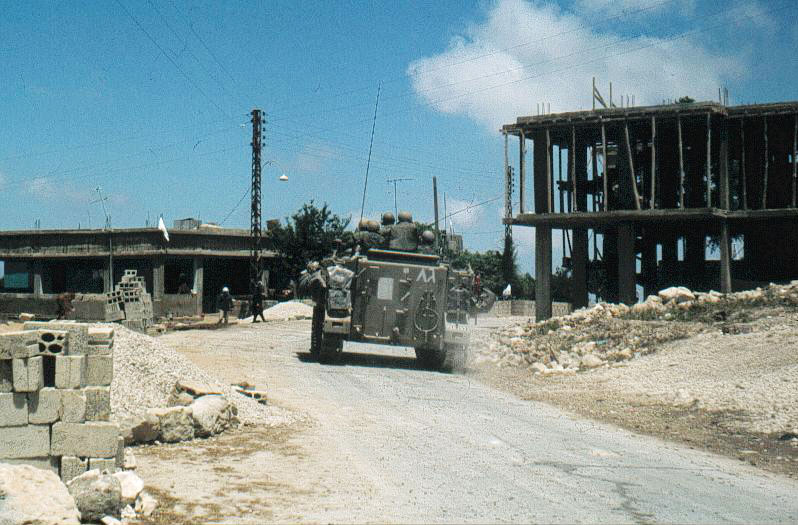
Israeli troops in South Lebanon, June 1982

  - 6 June – Following the assassination attempt on Israel's ambassador to the United Kingdom, IDF forces invade southern Lebanon in their "Operation Peace for the Galilee," eventually reaching as far north as the capital Beirut.
  - 9 June – The Israeli Air Force (IAF) launches Operation Mole Cricket 19, a suppression of enemy air defenses (SEAD) campaign against Syrian SAM batteries in the Beqaa Valley in east Lebanon. During the battle, the IAF destroys 17 of the 19 SAM batteries deployed in the Beqaa Valley and shoots down 29 Syrian fighter planes, without losses. This is the largest combat of the jet age, with 150 fighters from both sides.
  - 10 June – Battle of Sultan Yacoub
  - 13 June – IDF forces reach West Beirut.
  - 18 September – Members of the Lebanese Christian militia (the Kataeb Party) kill between 762 and 3,500 civilians, mostly Palestinians and Lebanese Shiites, in Sabra and the Shatila refugee camp, which had been surrounded by Israeli troops. The massacre was presented as retaliation for the assassination of newly elected Lebanese president Bachir Gemayel, the leader of the Kataeb Party.

=== Unknown dates ===
- The founding of the moshav Ein Tamar.
- The founding of Ariel University.

== Births ==
- 18 February – Nili Natkho, Circassian Israeli basketball player (died 2004).
- 3 April – Dana Ivgy, Israeli film and TV actress.
- 12 June – Aviv Alush, Israeli actor
- 4 August – Daniel Efrat, actor, theatre director, and translator.
- 30 November – Nelly Tagar, Israeli actress and stand-up comedian

== Deaths ==
- 16 January – Moshe Harif (born 1933), Polish-born Israeli politician and kibbutz activist.
- 3 February – Joseph Bentwich (born 1902), British-born Israeli educator.
- 16 February – Haim Gamzu (born 1910), Russian (Ukraine)-born art and drama critic.
- 21 February – Gershom Scholem (born 1897), German-born Israeli Jewish philosopher and historian.
- 28 February – Shmuel Yeivin (born 1896), Russian (Ukraine)-born Israeli archaeologist.
- 15 October – Rachel Cohen-Kagan (born 1888), Russian (Ukraine)-born Zionist activist and Israeli politician.
- 8 December – Haim Laskov (born 1919), Russian (Belarus)-born Israeli general, fifth Chief of Staff of the Israel Defense Forces.
- Full date unknown – Isaac Michaelson (born 1903), British (Scotland)-born Israeli ophthalmologist.

== See also ==
- 1982 in Israeli film
- 1982 in Israeli television
- 1982 in Israeli music
- 1982 in Israeli sport
- Israel in the Eurovision Song Contest 1982
