= The Dreamer (1970 film) =

1970 film

- Film poster
- Directed by: Dan Wolman
- Written by: Dan Wolman
- Produced by: Ami Artzi; Christopher C. Dewey; Dennis Friedland
- Starring: Tuvia Tavi
- Cinematography: Paul Glickman
- Edited by: Barry H. Prince
- Music by: Gershon Kingsley
- Distributed by: Cannon Films
- Release date: 1970
- Running time: 85 minutes
- Country: Israel
- Language: Hebrew

The Dreamer (Hebrew: Ha-Timhoni) is a 1970 Israeli New Sensibility drama film written and directed by Dan Wolman, his first feature film. The lead roles are played by Tuvia Tavi, Liora Rivlin, and Berta Litvinov. The film was a failure in Israel but was accepted into the 1970 Cannes Film Festival and was screened in New York for more than three months.

The film was shot at the Beit HaSarayah in Safed, which at the time served as a nursing home for Melab'n, and in the alleyways of the old city of Safed.

The plot centers around an eccentric young man who is (platonically) attracted to an elderly woman until a young and attractive girl appears. The role of the elderly woman was initially offered to Ida Kaminska, but she could not appear and recommended her friend, Berta Litvinov, who was 74 at the time.

== Synopsis ==
Eli (Tuvia Tavi) works as an orderly in a nursing home in Safed. He serves food to the elderly, feeds and bathes them, tends to the garden, and is responsible for the building’s maintenance under the watchful eye of the strict home manager, Stein (Shlomo Bar-Shavit). In his free time, he draws portraits of the elderly residents and tries to sell them at a nearby gallery, but there are no buyers for his sketches. He rarely speaks and appears eccentric. When he walks from the nursing home to his room in the city, children stare at him as if he is odd and mentally unstable.

Of all the elderly residents, he is particularly drawn to Rachel (Berta Litvinov), an elderly woman from Kiev who speaks broken Hebrew. The other residents gossip in Yiddish about the relationship between Eli and Rachel. Rachel likes Eli and wants to help him. She dresses as a tourist, goes to the gallery, and buys Eli’s drawings. He is overjoyed that someone has bought his sketches, and Rachel encourages him, telling him that a great future awaits him.

One of the elderly residents dies, and his three family members come to the nursing home to handle the funeral arrangements. The granddaughter is a young, beautiful, and attractive woman (Liora Rivlin), who arrives with her father (Natan Kogan) and mother (Devorah Kedar).

Eli exchanges glances with the young woman, and a bond develops between them, growing stronger and eventually leading to an intimate relationship. The elderly residents gossip about it, and Rachel hears them and sees the young woman. She cuts off her connection with Eli, and when he knocks on her door, she refuses to open it.

In the end, the young woman returns to Tel Aviv with her parents, Rachel forgives Eli, and they walk together through the alleys of Safed. Eli draws, and Rachel plays with young children in a playground.

== Cast ==
- Tuvia Tavi as Eli
- Liora Rivlin as Girl
- Berta Litwina as Old Woman Rachel
- Shlomo Bar-Shavit as Manager of Home
- Dvora Kedar as Mother (as Devora Halter-Keidar)
- Natan Cogan as Father
- Yisrael Segal as Waiter
- Nathan Wolfovich as Mushkin (as Nathan W. Volfovitz)
- Bila Rabinovitz as Litvinna
