= Going Steady (1979 film) =

- Directed by: Boaz Davidson
- Screenplay by: Boaz Davidson; Eli Tavor
- Produced by: Menahem Golan; Yoram Globus
- Starring: Yiftach Katzur; Yvonne Miklosh; Jonathan Sagall; Zachi Noy; Rachel Steiner
- Cinematography: Adam Greenberg
- Production company: Golan-Globus Productions
- Release date: 1979
- Running time: 88 minutes
- Country: Israel

Going Steady (Israeli: Yotzim Kavua) is a 1979 Israeli film. It is the second in the Lemon Popsicle film series.

== Synopsis ==
The film concerns three teenage boys, Benji (Benzi), Bobby (Momo), and Huey (Yudale). Benji falls in love with Tammy at a party. He tries to make love to her but she leaves the party. When Benji gets drunk and Huey's girlfriend, Martha, tries to sleep with him, he rebuffs her. He keeps his distance with Tammy, hoping she would be the one to apologize. Eventually, he gives up and makes up for her with the help of his friend, Huey. However, their relationship suffers when Bobby accuses Benji of cheating on his girlfriend, Tammy, with Martha. To Benji's dismay, Tammy shows up on prom with Bobby and learns that Tammy and Bobby were "screwing". He decides to leave the town with Shelly but stops when Huey tells the lie he made up about Tammy and Bobby and discovers it was him that Tammy truly loved.

== Cast ==
- Yiftach Katzur as Benzi
- Jonathan Sagall as Momo
- Zachi Noy as Yudale
- Yvonne Miklosh as Tammy
- Rachel Steiner as Martha
- Daphna Armoni as Shelly
- Dvora Kedar as Sonja (Benzi's Mother)
- Menashe Warshavsky as Romek (Benzi's Father)

== Reception ==
From contemporary reviews, Martyn Auty of The Monthly Film Bulletin declared that the film was "More offensive than its predecessor Lemon Popsicle" as it took "the opportunity to abuse women in both script and shooting with a sexism unknown to routine soft-porn. The same misogyny extends to the portrait of Benji's 'typical' Jewish mother."
