= List of Israeli films of 1986 =

This is a list of films produced by the Israeli film industry in 1986.

== 1986 releases ==
Premiere	Title	Director	Cast	Genre	Notes	Ref
14 February	The Delta Force (Hebrew: מחץ הדלתא)	Menahem Golan	Chuck Norris	Action, Drama, Thriller	An Israeli-American co-production	
8 August	Ricochets (Hebrew: שתי אצבעות מצידון)	Eli Cohen	Roni Pinkovitch, Shaul Mizrahi, Alon Abutbul	War, Drama	Produced by the IDF Spokesperson's Unit	
5 October	The Frog Prince	Jackson Hunsicker	Helen Hunt, Amanda Pays, Aileen Quinn	Family, Drama, Musical, Fantasy	An Israeli-American co-production	

=== Unknown premiere date ===
Premiere	Title	Director	Cast	Genre	Notes	Ref
?	Alex Holeh Ahavah (Hebrew: אלכס חולה אהבה, lit. "Alex Is Lovesick")	Boaz Davidson	Eitan Anshel, Sharon Hacohen, Uri Kabiri, Avi Kushnir	Comedy, Drama, Romance		
?	Avanti popolo (Hebrew: אוונטי פופולו)	Rafi Bukai	Salim Dau, Tuvia Gelber, Suhel Haddad	Drama, War		
?	Chozeh Ahavah (Hebrew: חוזה אהבה, lit. "The Love Contract")	Dan Wolman	Anat Atzmon, Shmuel Atzmon, Irit Zohar, Ravit Zohar	Drama		
?	Yaldei Stalin (Hebrew: ילדי סטאלין, lit. "Stalin's Children")	Nadav Levitan	Aharon Almog, Ezra Dagan	Biography, Drama	Screened at the 1988 Cannes Film Festival	
?	Nadia (Hebrew: נאדיה, lit. "Girls")	Amnon Rubinstein	Hana Azoulay-Hasfari	Drama		
?	Esther (Hebrew: אסתר)	Amos Gitai	Simone Benyamini, Mohammad Bakri, Juliano Mer, Zare Vartanian	Drama		
?	The Smile of the Lamb (Hebrew: חיוך הגדי)	Shimon Dotan	Tuncel Kurtiz	Drama	Kurtiz won the Silver Bear for Best Actor at Berlin	
?	Ha-Tov, HaRa, VeHaLo-Nora (Hebrew: הטוב, הרע, והלא כל כך רע, lit. 'The Good, the Bad, and the Not So Bad')	Assi Dayan	Gabi Amrani, Tikva Aziz, Giles Ben-David	Drama		
?	Bread (Hebrew: לחם)	Ram Loevy	Etti Ankri, Rivka Bahar, Rami Danon	Drama	Was the 1986 Winner for Fiction at Prix Italia	
?	Bar 51 (Hebrew: בר 51)	Amos Guttman	Smadar Kilchinsky, Juliano Mer-Khamis, Ada Valerie-Tal	Crime, Drama		
?	Gloves (Hebrew: כפפות)	Rafi Adar, Ami Amir	Sharon Hacohen, Ezra Kafri, Antonio Marsina	Drama		
?	All My Loving (Hebrew: קול אהובתי)	Yohanan Weller	Alon Aboutboul, Dorit Adi, Dalia Beger	Drama		
?	House Committee Rivalry (Hebrew: הקרב על הוועד)	Avi Cohen	Shaike Levi, Yisrael Poliakov, Gavri Banai	Comedy		
?	Prom Queen (Hebrew: מלכת הקיטה)	Isaac Zepel Yeshurun	Alon Aboutboul, Johnny Arbid, Doron Avrahami	Drama		
?	Million Dollar Madness (Hebrew: הטירוף הגדול)	Naftali Alter	Seffy Rivlin, Arik Lavie, Dina Doron	Comedy		

== Awards ==
=== Ophir Award ===	=== Wolgin Award ===

== See also ==
- 1986 in Israel
