= Atalia =

- Theatrical poster
- Directed by: Akiva Tevet
- Screenplay by: Tzvika Kertzner
- Story by: Yitzhak Ben Ner
- Produced by: Omri Maron; Danny Shick; Shmuel Shiloh
- Starring: Michal Bat-Adam; Yiftah Katzor; Yossi Polak; Dan Toren
- Cinematography: Nurith Aviv
- Edited by: Ruben Korenfeld
- Music by: Nachum Heiman
- Distributed by: Ergo Media (US)
- Release date: 1984
- Running time: 90 minutes
- Country: Israel
- Language: Hebrew

Atalia (Hebrew: עתליה) is a 1984 Israeli drama film directed by Akiva Tevet. It was adapted from a story by Yitzhak Ben Ner and mostly shot on location at Kibbutz Yakum.

== Plot ==
Atalia (Michal Bat-Adam) is a 40-year-old widow who lost her husband in the Six-Day War and lives on a kibbutz with her adolescent daughter (Gail Ben-Ner). Lonely and feeling outcast, she enters into a forbidden affair with her daughter's classmate, Matti Yiftach Katzur, an idealistic 19-year-old who had been rejected by the army. Atalia is independent-minded and non-conformist, so when her affair becomes known, the kibbutz leaders have the excuse they need to ostracize her. The slow degeneration of the once-idealistic kibbutz into a puritanical society, the strait-jacket of its conservative view of masculinity, and the conformity of her daughter all provide a backdrop to Atalia's problems.

== Cast ==
- Michal Bat-Adam as Atalia
- Yiftach Katzur as Matti
- Rafael Klatchkin
- Yossi Pollack
- Dan Toren
- Gail Ben-Ner as Netta
- Yair Rubin
- Tamar Amiran

== Significance of the name ==
The original Athaliah was a Biblical queen of Judea, whom the Bible presents as a tyrannical usurper and idolater. Used, though not commonly, as a female first name in Israel, Atalia is a secularist name associated with the sector of Israeli society which tends to rebel against old traditions and conventions and seek new ways. This meaning is obvious to Israeli audiences, and clearly has some relevance to the film's themes.

== Critical reception ==
The film received poor reviews and poor attendance at the box office (only 80,000 tickets were sold).
