= Murder of Danny Katz =

1983 terrorist attack

- Location: Northern District, Israel
- Date: December 8, 1983; 42 years ago
- Assailants: 5 Arab assailants

The murder of Danny Katz was a terrorist attack carried out in 1983 in which a Palestinian militant killed 14-year-old Israeli Danny Katz. The attack, prominent among a series of attacks aimed at Israeli children during the early 1980s, shocked the Israeli public due to its brutal nature. It signified to many in the Israeli public a deterioration to their personal security at that time.

== The murder ==
On Thursday December 8, 1983, the 14-year-old Israeli Danny Katz, a resident of the Denia neighborhood of Haifa, left his house to visit a friend, but disappeared en route.

After a three-day search Katz' mutilated body was found outside a remote cave in the Sakhnin region, bearing marks of strangulation, torture, and sexual assault.

== The assailants ==
A letter found in the pile of garbage near the cave led the investigators to Samir Ghanem, a resident of Sakhnin. Ghanem initially denied the allegations, but later confessed and implicated four additional partners in crime – Fathi Janameh, Ali Ganayem and Atef Sabihi. All admitted to killing Danny Katz. All were eventually found guilty of murder and sentenced to life imprisonment. Atef Sabihi, also confessed later on to the 1982 abduction, rape and murder of 19-year-old Israeli Daphna Carmon.

== Aftermath ==
The assailants' attorney Avigdor Feldman claimed that the suspects' conviction was improper due to a lack of solid evidence against the accused and the court's reliance solely on their confessions, which according to the defendants, were given under duress. In 1991 the Israeli Supreme Court ruled that the defendants' claims were not credible and that their conviction on the basis of their confessions and additional evidence were sufficient.

Following continuous public pressure, the Israeli Justice Minister David Libai ordered the attorney Judith Karp to prepare a report about the case. Following the report, an appeal for a retrial was handed to the Israeli supreme court. President of the Supreme Court Aharon Barak ruled in 1999 that a retrial would be held for the accused.

In 2000 the retrial began, a relatively rare procedure in the Israeli legal system. The defendants were convicted again in 2002 after the judges were convinced that the defendants' confessions were admissible. Defense attorney Feldman appealed to the Supreme Court, but his appeal was unanimously rejected after the court examined the evidence and ruled that the district court's verdict was well established.

In 2007 Israeli President Shimon Peres issued a pardon reducing the sentences of Danny Katz's assailants. The significance of reducing the sentence of the killers meant that they now had the option of asking the prison parole board to deduct a third of their sentences. In July 2008, the prison parole board rejected Danny Katz's assailants appeal to deduct a third of their sentences on the grounds that they are still dangerous to the public.

Three of the assailants were released from prison in January 2017. The remaining two, charged also for the murder of Daphna Carmon, are expected to be released in 2029.

== See also ==
- List of solved missing person cases: 1950–1999
