= Yiftach Katzur =

Israeli actor, director, producer and strategist (born 1958)

- יפתח קצור
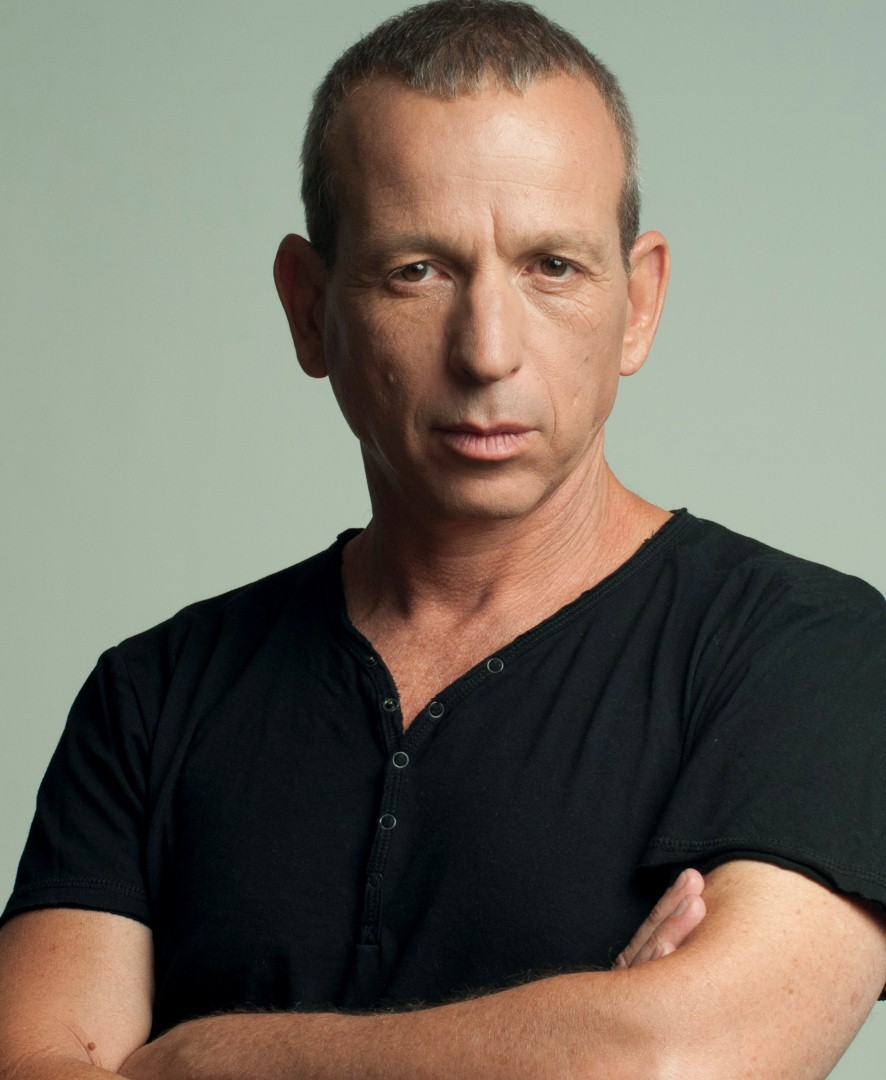
- Born: July 17, 1958 (age 68) tel Aviv, Israel
- Years active: 1976–1997
- Known for: Actor, Business man
- Website: http://www.katzur.co.il/

Yiftach Katzur (Hebrew: יפתח קצור, sometimes spelled Yftach Katzur), also known in Germany as Jesse Katzur) is an Israeli actor, director, producer, and business strategist, born on July 17, 1958, in Israel. He gained international fame for his role as Benji (Bentzi) in the popular Israeli film series Lemon Popsicle (Eis am Stiel)—an eight-part coming-of-age comedy that began in 1978 and became a cultural phenomenon in Israel and beyond. Lemon Popsicle (Hebrew: אסקימו לימון, romanized: Eskimo Limon) is a 1978 teen comedy-drama film co-written and directed by Boaz Davidson. It became the most commercially successful Israeli film of all time, leading to the production of several sequels. The cult film follows a group of three teenage boys in early-1960s Tel Aviv. Katzur’s character, the shy and sensitive member of a trio of teenage friends, was based on the series’ director, Boaz Davidson.

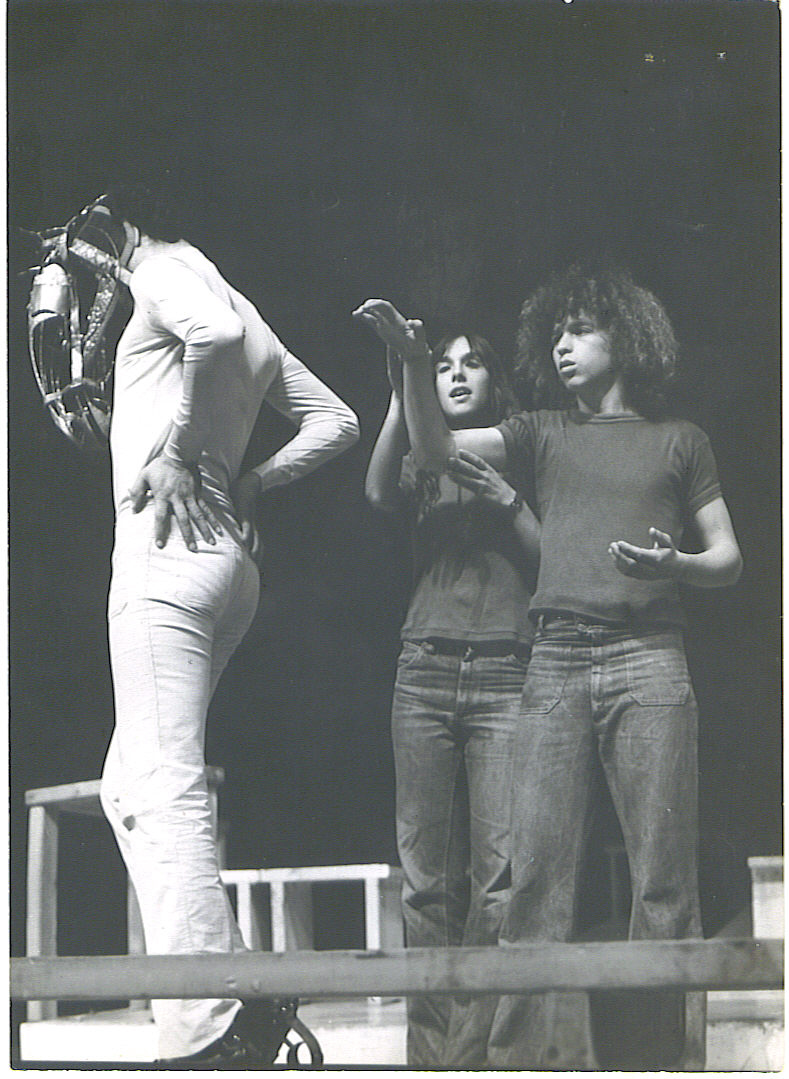
From right: Yiftach Katzur, Amira Pollan and Avi Yakir in the play "Aquus" by the Cameri Theater

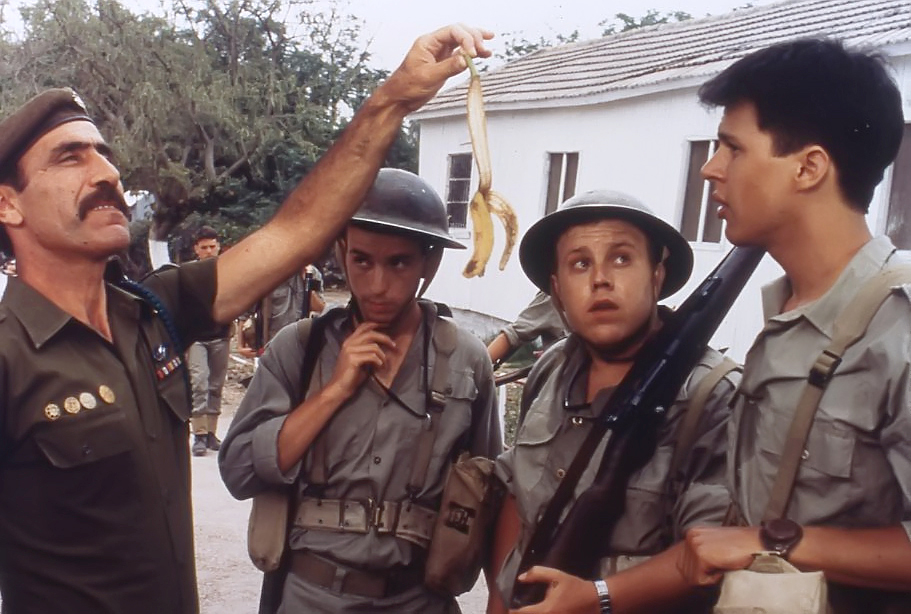
Jonathan Sagall, Zachi Noy, Yiftach Katzor and Yosef Shiloah in the film Spihas

== Biography ==
Katzur began his acting career at age 18 in 1976, playing the lead role of Alan Strang in Equus by Peter Shaffer at the Cameri Theatre in Israel. His film debut came in 1977 with a small role in the political thriller The Honey Connection by Yeud Levanon.

Beyond Lemon Popsicle, Katzur appeared in theater plays Equus, Taining of the other notable films, including a small role as an epileptic boy in The Jesus Movie (1979), the American film The Ambassador (1984) alongside Robert Mitchum and Rock Hudson as lenny, as well as Israeli productions such as Atalia as Matti, and Night Soldier. In 1993, he starred in and directed a pilot for a TV series called Lemonade, inspired by Lemon Popsicle, though it was never produced. His last known acting role was in the 1997 film Gentila, which won the 1998 Haifa Film Festival Award for Best Film.

== Career ==
=== Acting career ===
In 1976, Katzur was nominated for the Kinor David Award as Theater Actor of the Year. In 1978, he won the Kinor David Award for Film Actor of the Year for his role in Lemon Popsicle, starring alongside Anat Atzmon, Jonathan Sagall, and Zachi Noy. The role brought him international fame, particularly in Europe and the Far East, and he reprised it in several sequels.

In 1984, he starred in the film Atalia alongside Michal Bat-Adam. Throughout his career, he appeared in numerous Israeli and international films while continuing to perform in repertory theater.

Alongside acting, Katzur trained as a screenwriter, playwright, and director. In 1984, he graduated from Beit Zvi School, specializing in film directing. In 1990, he studied screenwriting at Tel Aviv University and was selected to participate in the prestigious FEMI screenwriting workshop led by Frank Daniel, held in Switzerland, Belgium, and Germany.

Katzur has also worked as a columnist for Yedioth Ahronoth, Ha'ir, and Hadashot, and wrote an economic column for Calcalist , TheMarker. Additionally, he was a film critic for Kol Yisrael and hosted a film program on the Cable television news show Tachana Merkazit on Tevel News.

=== Business career ===
After transitioning from acting, Katzur pursued a successful career in business and media:

- In 1990, he founded Actmedia Israel Ltd., an in-store marketing agency affiliated with News Corp., pioneering point-of-sale advertising in Israel.
- In the early 2000s, for a period, director of the content division of Meimad Television Studios.
- In 2002, in collaboration with the Joshua Rabinowitz Foundation for the Arts and Israel’s Culture Ministry, he founded Kolnoa Investments, the country’s first venture capital fund for films, and was CEO for six years.
- In 2012, he founded Feijoya, an online real estate startup that revolutionized property sales by introducing a digital platform for competitive bidding.
- In 2020, he established Business Analytic Pro, an AI consulting firm that specializes in AI-driven economic automation processes, helping organizations optimize operations through strategic AI implementation.

Katzur is also an experienced advertising professional, content creator, and entrepreneur. In recent years, he has remained active in the fields of fintech and digital currencies, focusing on emerging financial technologies and blockchain-based solutions.

Even after stepping away from acting, Katzur remains a well-known figure in Israel and occasionally appears in documentaries, including Eskimo Limon – Eis am Stiel: Von Siegern und Verlierern (2018). Privet lesson on Keshet 12 TV, Kol Mehavar Kan 11 TV

== Filmography ==
- Lemon Popsicle (Eis Am Stiel) אסקימו לימון) (1978)
- Eskimo Limon 2: Yotzim Kavua (1979)
- Eskimo Limon 3: Shifshuf Naim (1981)
- Eskimo Limon 4: Sapiches (1982)
- Eskimo Limon 5: Roman Za'ir (1984)
- Eskimo Limon 6: Harimu Ogen (1985)
- Eskimo Limon 7: Ahava Tzeira (1987)
- Eskimo Limon 8: Summertime Blues (1988)
- Soldier of the Night (Chayal HaLaila) (1984)
- Atalia (1984)
- Ahava rishona (1982)
- The Ambassador (1984)
- Like Thieves in the Night (1987)
- Jesus (Yeshu) (1989)
- Gentila (1997)

== Notable plays in which he participated ==
- Equus, (Alan Strang ) Cameri Theatre - 1976
- The Taming of the Shrew, (Hortanzio) Cameri Theater - 1977
- The Love of Don Perlimplin (Don Perlimplin) IDF Theater 1978
- Palestinian, Haifa Theater, (David) 1987
- The Herald, Acre Festival – 1991

== Director and producer ==
- Metodlikim (50 min) – 2010, Production and Direction. A prime-time broadcast for Reshet 12
- Cellular (50 min) – 2008, Production
- La'uf (25 min) – Production and Direction
- Israeli Play (1986) – Documentary, Production and Direction. In collaboration with Haifa Theater, the film was purchased by the Institute for Political Studies, Bonn, Germany.
- Back to the Monument (1983) – Documentary, Production and Direction
- Drawing (1985) – Documentary, Production and Direction Festivals: Haifa 1985, Jerusalem 1986, Leipzig 1986
