= Yoni Tabac =

Israeli actor

- יוני טבק
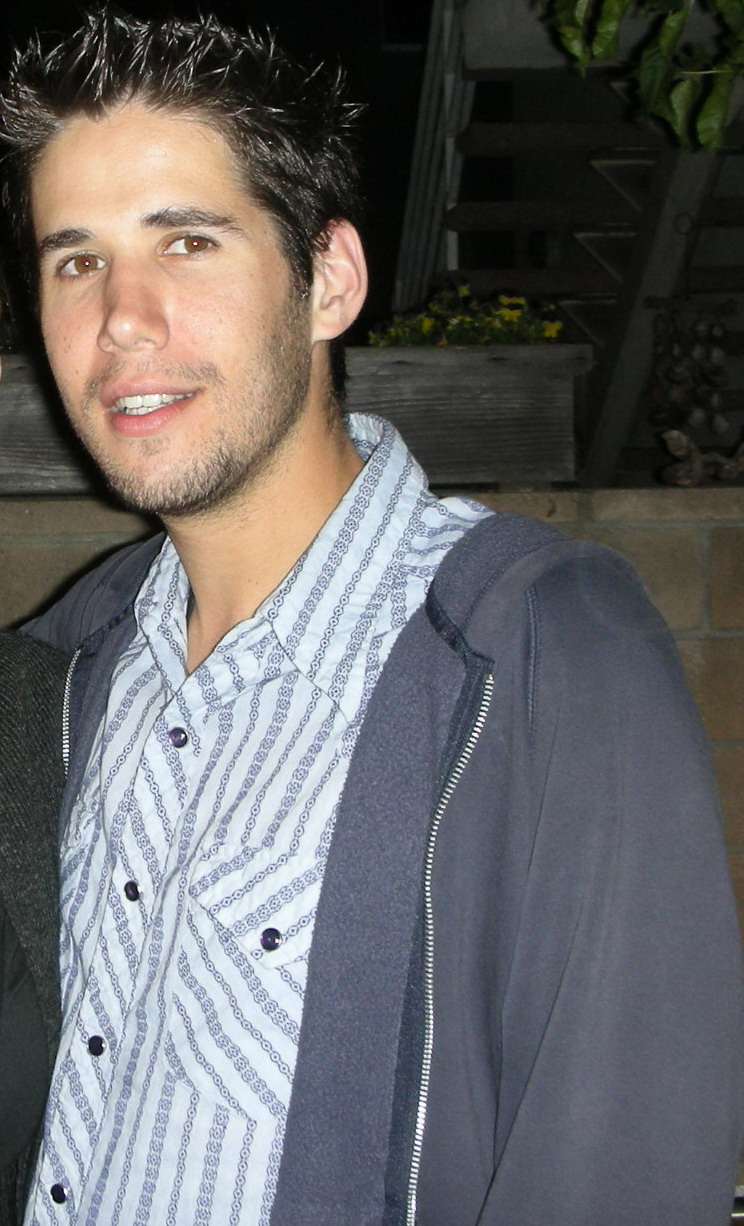
- Yoni Tabac, 2007
- Born: 21 April 1980 (age 46); Haifa, Israel
- Occupation: Actor
- Years active: 2002–present
- Partner: (married)
- Website: Yonitabac

Yoni Tabac (Hebrew: יוני טבק; born 21 April 1980) is an Israeli actor of Romanian descent who is best known for his role in the film Polanski.

== Life ==
Tabac was born and raised in Israel. Tabac received a fine arts bachelor's degree in acting, specializing in lighting design and technical direction in Israel. He toured with the Israeli Repertory Theatre while also working as a technician and rigger for the University Theatre in Haifa. During this period, Tabac also working with several production houses to introduce classical drama and contemporary theater productions to Israel.

After completing Israeli military duty in 2002, Tabac migrated to Los Angeles, United States. In Los Angeles, Tabac has worked within several different theater projects, including becoming a member of the Beverly Hills Playhouse. Founded by theater director and drama teacher, Milton Katselas, the Beverly Hills Playhouse is one of Los Angeles' oldest acting schools.

== Filmography ==
- The Bait
- Dockweiler
- Nic & Tristan Go Mega Dega
- Shrink
- Babycakes
- Man Stroke Woman
- Wild Girls Gone
- All Souls Day: Dia de los Muertos
- A Thousand Words
- I'm Not Gay
- The Forgotten Jewel
