= Lemon Popsicle =

1978 film by Boaz Davidson

- Theatrical release poster
- Hebrew: אסקימו לימון
- Directed by: Boaz Davidson
- Written by: Boaz Davidson; Eli Tavor
- Produced by: Yoram Globus; Menahem Golan
- Starring: Yiftach Katzur; Anat Atzmon; Zachi Noy; Jonathan Sagall; Dvora Kedar; Ophelia Shtruhl; Denise Bouzaglo
- Cinematography: Adam Greenberg
- Edited by: Alain Jakubowicz
- Production companies: Noah Films; The Cannon Group, Inc.; K.F Kinofilm Production; SCO
- Distributed by: Noah Films (Israel); Scotia International Filmverleih (West Germany)
- Release dates: February 11, 1978 (Israel); April 21, 1978 (West Germany)
- Running time: 95 minutes
- Countries: Israel; West Germany
- Language: Hebrew
- Budget: IL3 million
- Box office: IL12.5 million (Israel; 1978)

Lemon Popsicle (Hebrew: אסקימו לימון, romanized: Eskimo Limon) is a 1978 teen comedy-drama film co-written and directed by Boaz Davidson. It is the most commercially successful Israeli film of all time, which has led to the production of a series of sequels. The cult film follows a group of three teenage boys in early-1960s Tel Aviv.

== Plot ==
The story begins in the summer of 1958. Benji (Bentzi in the Hebrew release, played by Yiftach Katzur), Bobby (Momo in the Hebrew release, played by Jonathan Sagall) and Huey (Yuda'le in the Hebrew release, played by Zachi Noy) are three teenage boys in the city of Tel Aviv in the late 1950s who study at the Shalva Gymnasium high school and pass the time, among other things, at the Montana Ice Cream Shop.

The three's class is joined by a beautiful new girl named Niki (Nili in the Hebrew release, played by Anat Atzmon), who caught Benji's eye. At the Friday party at Huey's, Benji sees Niki dancing with Bobby and Huey tells him that if she is in Bobby's hands, he has no chance with her. Learning that Nili is a virgin, Bobby brags to his friends that he will seduce, then dump her, much to Benji's dismay. However, Benji is too dependent on his friends and too reluctant to ruin their friendship to warn Niki of Bobby's intentions, and must watch as Bobby and Niki begin dating. The frustrated Benji drinks an entire bottle of wine and gets drunk, and Huey has to take him home. The next day Benji goes to work selling ice, until a female customer calls out to the owner of the business from the window to send Benji to her with the ice. It turns out that the woman (Ophelia Shtruhl) is an older olah named Stella ("the ultimate Stella") and she tries to seduce Benji, but he tells her that he has to go back to work and that he will come visit her. Benji calls Bobby and Huey to come with him to the woman's house. There, after drinking whisky and dancing, they enter her room one by one and have sex with her. When it's Benji's turn, a friend of Stella's, Johnny the Sailor, enters the apartment. Bobby and Bentji manage to leave, but Huey, who tried to take his clothes, is beaten and finally flees the house in his underwear.

A few days later, Bobby asks Benji for the keys to his grandmother's apartment, so he can bring Niki there and Benji says he will get it for him. That evening, when the three meet at the ice cream shop, Benzi says that his mother hid the keys. Bobby gives up spending time with Niki and goes with the three to Ricki the whore (Denise Bozaglou). The next day, all three feel itching in the groin area and it turns out that they got pubic lice from Ricky. They go to the pharmacy and ask him for an ointment for this issue. A day later, Benji meets with Huey and a boy from their class named Froi'ka, who tells him that Bobby went with Niki to sail on the Yarkon River and they are about to have sex. Later in the evening, Bobby appears at the ice cream parlor and tells Benji about his time with Niki.

At the end of year school ceremony, Benji sees Niki arguing with Bobby and then sees her leaving the auditorium crying. Outside she tells him that she is pregnant. Benji comforts Niki and then bursts into the sports hall in a rage, and starts fighting with Bobby. Benji takes Niki to have an abortion and pays for it with his own money. He sells his bike, steals money from his mom, and takes out a loan from his boss, and ends up bringing her to live with him for a few days at his grandma's apartment, since they are supposed to be at summer camp with the whole class. Benji confesses his love to Niki and they kiss. She invites him to her birthday party next Monday and he confirms his arrival. Benji buys her a precious gold heart pendant with the words "To Niki with Love" engraved on it. When Benji arrives at the party, he looks for Niki and finds her in the kitchen – cuddling with Bobby. Niki and Bobby notice the shocked Benji, and he leaves the party heartbroken to the tune of the song "Mr. Lonely".

== Production ==
"Eskimo Limon" was produced by "Sarei Nahum" Studios, owned by Menahem Golan and Yoram Globus, who were also responsible for its distribution and screening. Zeev Rav-Nof expressed the opinion that the company's dominance in the Israeli film market significantly contributed to its success.

According to Boaz Davidson, the screenplay was inspired by his own youth as well as the American film American Graffiti.

The production budget amounted to three million ILs, of which one million was paid as royalties to the copyright holders of the songs in the soundtrack. The film's music was adapted to the era and includes hits from the late 1950s and early 1960s, featuring songs such as Rock Around the Clock by Bill Haley, Tutti Frutti and Long Tall Sally (Little Richard), Put Your Head on My Shoulder, You Are My Destiny, Diana (Paul Anka), Greenfields (The Brothers Four), To Know Him Is to Love Him (Phil Spector and The Teddy Bears), and the hit Piove (Domenico Modugno, better known as Ciao, Ciao Bambina).

== Reviews and awards ==
"Eskimo Limon" became a massive box-office success. By late December 1978, it had sold 1,268,000 tickets in Israel, generating 12.5 million ILs in revenue. It was also distributed in 700 copies across Europe, earning an additional $650,000.

The Israeli Film and Play Review Council restricted the film to audiences aged 16 and older due to its explicit sexual content. However, the press reported widespread instances of younger teenagers sneaking into screenings.

In total, Eskimo Limon sold 1,350,000 tickets in Israel, making it the highest-grossing Israeli film of all time. Kazablan ranks second with 1,222,500 tickets sold, followed by Sallah Shabati with 1,184,900. The film also achieved significant success in West Germany, ranking 11th at the box office with 2,700,000 tickets sold.

On 19 April 1978, Eskimo Limon won first prize in the annual Israeli feature film competition, accompanied by a grant of 120,000 ILs. Boaz Davidson received the Best Director award, Adam Greenberg won Best Cinematography, and Yiftach Katzur was awarded Best Actor. The awards were presented by Minister of Industry, Trade, and Labor Yigal Horowitz.

The film represented Israel at the 1978 Berlin Film Festival and was a finalist for the Golden Globe Award for Best Foreign Language Film.

== Cast ==
- Yftach Katzur as Benzi
- Zachi Noy as Yudale
- Jonathan Sagall as Momo
- Anat Atzmon as Nili
- Ophelia Shtruhl as Stella
- Ariella Rabinovich as Doris
- Rachel Steiner as Martha
- Dvora Kedar as Sonja (Benzi's Mother)
- Menashe Warshavsky as Romek (Benzi's Father)
- Christiane Schmidtmer as Fritzi
- Sibylle Rauch as Frieda Denise
- Denise Bouzaglo as Ricki

== Release and reception ==
=== Budget ===
The picture was produced at a budget of IL3 million, of which a million was paid in royalties to the musicians (mostly American) whose songs were used in the soundtrack (such as Bill Haley, Paul Anka, Little Richard, Frankie Laine, the Chordettes and Bobby Vinton). Producer Menahem Golan claimed that the music rights cost more than the production of the film itself.

=== Box office ===
Lemon Popsicle became an immediate commercial success; by December 1978, the film had sold 1,268,000 tickets in its native country and grossed IL12.5 million. It was circulated in 700 prints in Europe, where it earned $650,000 during the same period. In total, it sold 1,350,000 tickets in the state, becoming the highest-grossing Israeli picture in history. In West Germany, it reached the 11th place at the 1978 box office, with 2.7 million tickets sold. Lemon Popsicle also gained considerable popularity in the rest of Europe and in Japan. It was nominated for the Golden Globe Award for Best Foreign Language Film in the 36th Golden Globe Awards, losing to Ingmar Bergman's Autumn Sonata. The film was also selected as the Israeli entry for the Best Foreign Language Film at the 51st Academy Awards, but was not accepted as a nominee.

== Sequels ==
The series became a success in Germany under the name Eis am Stiel. Most of the films were also dubbed into English and were released in both the United States and United Kingdom. Since the release of Lemon Popsicle, seven official sequels have been made. These were Going Steady (Yotzim Kavua) (1979), Hot Bubblegum (Shifshuf Naim) (1981), Private Popsicle (Sapiches) (1982), Baby Love (Roman Za'ir) (1984), Up Your Anchor (Harimu Ogen) (1985), Young Love (Ahava Tzeira) (1987) and Summertime Blues (Blues La-Kayitz) (1988). A spin-off film, Private Manoeuvres (Sababa), starring Zachi Noy as Yudale, appeared in 1983, and a reboot film, The Party Goes On (Hahagiga Nimshehet), which featured Noy as a restaurant owner, was released in 2001.

=== Hot Bubblegum ===
Shifshuf Naim
- Directed by: Boaz Davidson
- Written by: Boaz Davidson; Ingo Hermes; Eli Tavor; Sam Waynberg
- Produced by: Yoram Globus; Menahem Golan; Sam Waynberg; Danny Dimbort
- Cinematography: Amnon Salomon
- Edited by: Jon Koslowsky
- Release date: 1981
- Country: Israel
- Language: Hebrew

Hot Bubblegum (Hebrew: Shifshuf Naim) is the third film in the Lemon Popsicle series, set in Tel Aviv and released in 1981.

==== Synopsis ====
Benzi now has a girlfriend named Doris, but his feelings are put to the test when an old flame, Nikki comes back into his life. Unknown to Doris and despite the advice of his friends concerning Nikki's flirtiness, Benzi and Nikki begin dating, but eventually Doris catches them together. Meanwhile, Benzi's sexy cousin Frieda visits from Germany, and Yudale and Momo, as well as Benzi's father, end up lusting over her.

== Remake ==
In 1982, Davidson wrote and directed an American remake, The Last American Virgin, starring Lawrence Monoson and Diane Franklin.

== See also ==
- Israeli cinema
- List of submissions to the 51st Academy Awards for Best Foreign Language Film
- List of Israeli submissions for the Academy Award for Best Foreign Language Film
