= Zachi Noy =

Israeli actor (born 1953)

- צחי נוי
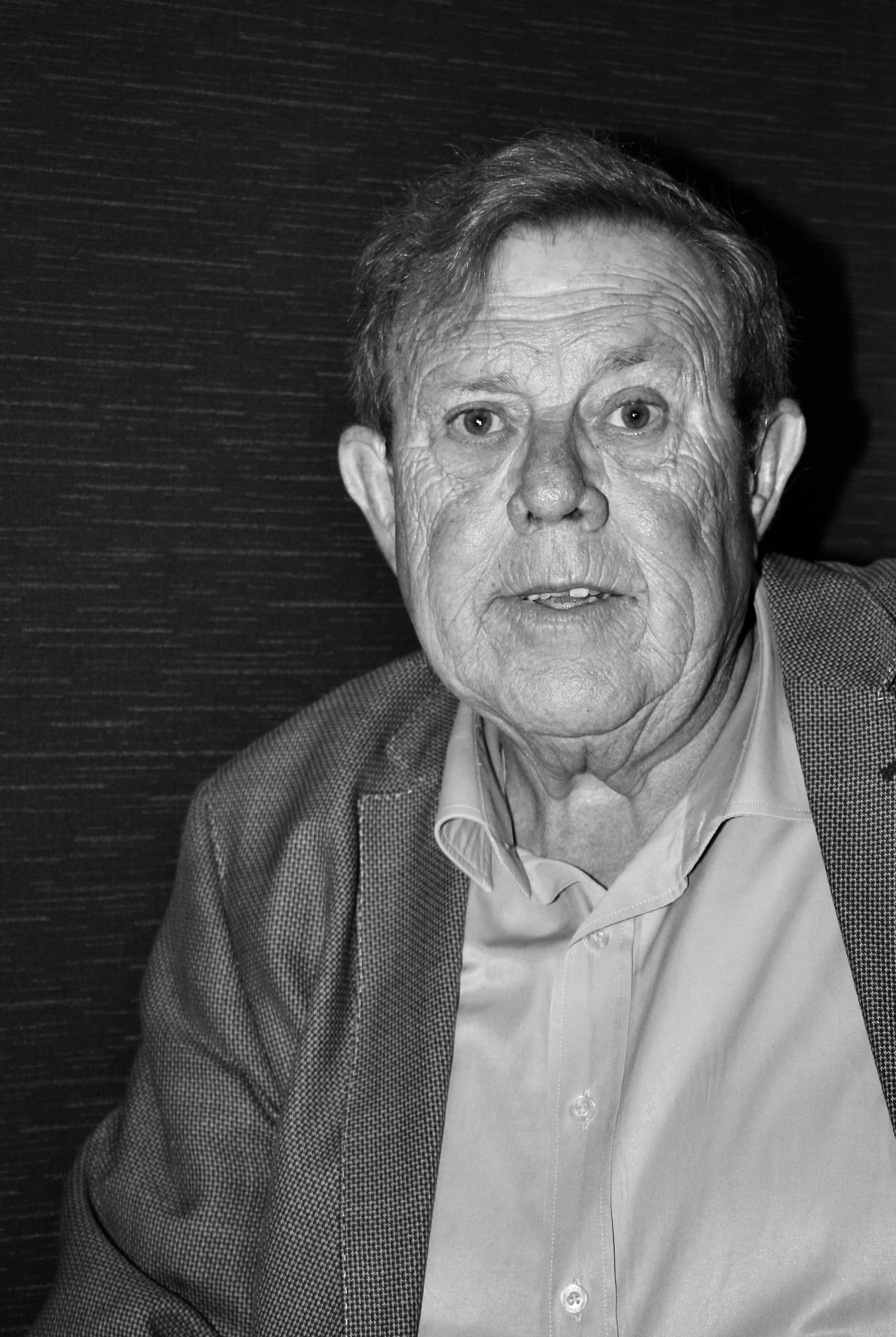
- Noy in 2024
- Born: Yitzhak Novogruder; 8 July 1953 (age 72); Haifa, Israel
- Occupation: Actor
- Years active: 1963–present
- Children: 2

Zachi Noy (Hebrew: צחי נוי; born 8 July 1953) is an Israeli actor.

== Early life ==
Noy was born in 1953 in Haifa, Israel with the name of Yitzhak Novogruder. At a young age, Noy did stage work for the local Israeli theater "HaSadna" in Haifa. Later, he did his military service in a military band.

== Career ==
Noy gained much success after he played Yudale in the successful 1978 Israeli film Lemon Popsicle (Eskimo Limon) which became an Israeli cult film and was followed by a series of sequels. In the following decade Noy participated in all the sequels of "Lemon Popsicle" including a spin-off film called "Sababa".

Over the years Noy also played in a number of Israeli musicals for children such as "Peter Pan", "The Wizard of Oz" And "Sallah Shabati", as well as different Israeli entertainment stage shows and several children's television shows. Noy also participated in dubbing several animated movies into Hebrew – including Space Jam and The Swan Princess. He will next appear in a lead role of the upcoming feature by Daryush Shokof, called Poison Works.

== Personal life ==
Noy is married with two children. In May 2020, Noy's 91-year-old mother was reported missing. She was found dead two weeks later in Chalisa Neighborhood in Haifa which is further away from her regular environment.

== Filmography ==
=== Movies ===
- 1975: Ha-Diber Ha-11
- 1977: The Garden (Ha-Gan) – Rami
- 1977: Hamesh Ma'ot Elef Shahor (500,000 Black)
- 1978: Lemon Popsicle (Eskimo Limon) – Yudale / Huey / Johnny
- 1978: Popcorn and Ice Cream – Jonny
- 1978: Little Shraga (Shraga Hakatan) – Zachi
- 1979: Going Steady (Yotzim Kavua) – Yudale / Huey / Johnny
- 1979: The Magician of Lublin – Bolek
- 1979: My Mother the General (Imi Hageneralit)
- 1979: Arabian Nights (Arabische Nächte) – Chauffeur
- 1980: Heiße Kartoffeln – Max
- 1981: Hot Bubblegum (Shifshuf Naim) – Huey / Yudale
- 1981: Enter the Ninja – The Hook
- 1981: Laß laufen, Kumpel – Emil
- 1982: Private Popsicle (Sapiches) – Yudale / Hughie
- 1983: Die unglaublichen Abenteuer des Guru Jakob – Jakob
- 1983: Private Manoeuvres (Sababa) – Yudale / Kitbeg / Hughie
- 1984: The Ambassador – Ze'ev
- 1984: Baby Love (Roman Za'ir) – Yudale / Hughie
- 1985: Up Your Anchor (Harimu Ogen) – Yudale / Hughie
- 1987: Cannon Movie Tales: The Emperor's New Clothes – Hiccoughing Man
- 1987: Young Love (Ahava Tzeira) – Yudale / Hughie
- 1988: Starke Zeiten – Lilos Nachbar
- 1988: Summertime Blues (Blues Ba-Kayitz) – Hughie
- 1991: Onat Haduvdevanim
- 1990: The Day We Met (Neshika Bametzach) – Benzi Alman
- 1992: Liebesgrüße aus der Lederhose 7 – Kokosnüsse und Bananen – Fridolin
- 1993: Night Terrors – Chuck's Father
- 1994: Kafe V'Limon – Photographer
- 1994: Hakosem! – Arik / Aryeh, the Cowardly Lion
- 1994: Driks' Brother (Ha-Ach Shel Driks) – Rabi Weiss
- 1994: Ahare Hahagim – Langfus
- 1995: Yaldei Kenyon Hazahav
- 1995: Russian Roulette: Moscow 95
- 1999: Crossclub – The Legend of the Living Dead – Master
- 2001: The Party Goes On (Hahagiga Nimshehet) – Yehuda
- 2002: Hessed Shel Emet (Short) – Druk
- 2005: Days of Love (Yamim Shel Ahava) – Stalin
- 2007: The Little Traitor – Mr. Gihon
- 2008: Maftir – Jecky
- 2016: Project Genesis: Crossclub 2 – Meister
- 2016: Timeless – Regan
- 2016: EuroClub – Igor

=== TV series ===
- 1990: Ein Schloß am Wörthersee – Harry Leim
- 1995: Ha-Mone Dofek
- 1997: Kachol Amok – Inspector
- 1998–2000: Ramat Aviv Gimmel – Lawyer Fifo
- 1999: Gisbert
- 2001: City Tower – Meni Shmilovich
