= Moshe Levy (chief of staff) =

Israeli general (1936–2008)

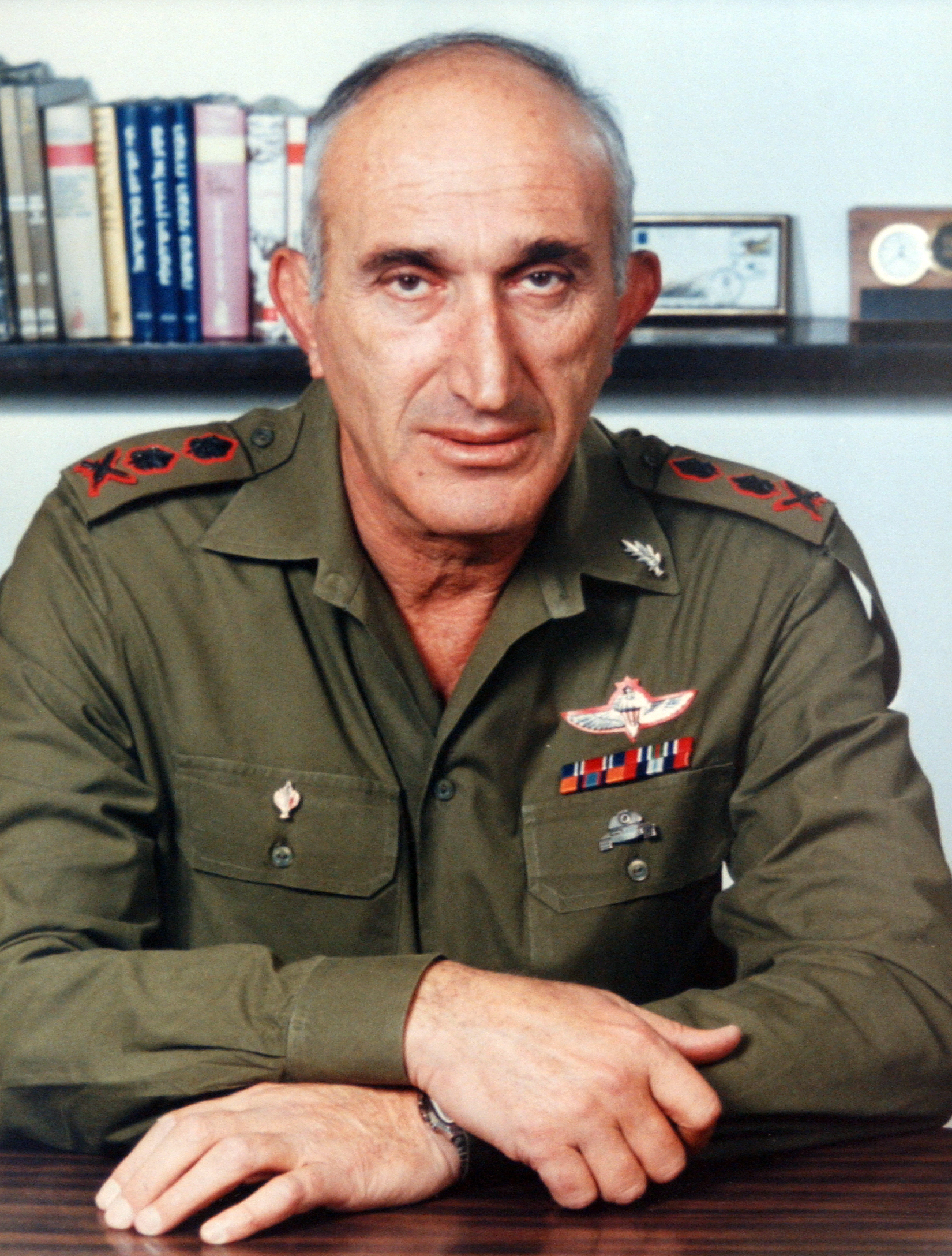
- Born: April 18, 1936; Tel Aviv, Mandatory Palestine
- Died: January 8, 2008 (aged 71); Afula, Israel
- Military career
- Allegiance: Israel
- Branch: Israel Defense Forces
- Service years: 1954–1987
- Rank: Rav Aluf (Chief of Staff; highest rank)

Signature
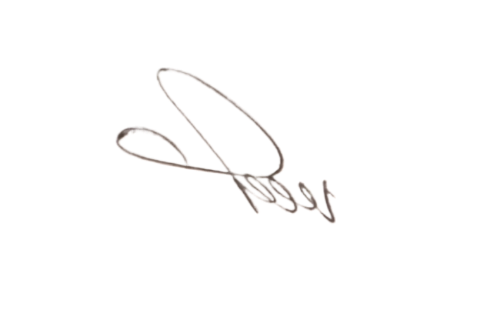

Moshe Levy (Hebrew: משה לוי; April 18, 1936 – January 8, 2008) was an Israeli military commander and the 12th Chief of Staff of the Israel Defense Forces (IDF). He served in this position from 1983 to 1987, towards the end of the first Lebanon war and the establishment of the South Lebanon Security Belt.

== Biography ==
Levy was born in Tel Aviv to Naima and Georgie Levy, an Iraqi-Jewish family. His father ran a clothing stand in the city's Carmel Market. He was known by his army nickname Moshe VaHetzi (Hebrew: משה וחצי ("Moshe and a half") because of his towering height, which was about 1.96 metres (6 ft 5 in).

He was drafted into the army in 1954 and served in the Golani Brigade. After completing his officers' course, Levy joined the Paratroopers Brigade. He fought in the Suez Crisis of 1956, during which he took part in the Mitla Pass parachute drop. From 1963 to 1967, he held a number of command positions in the Paratroopers Brigade, and became its operations officer. He was appointed commander of the School for Parachuting and Guerrilla Warfare. During the Six-Day War, Levy fought on the Sinai and Golan Heights fronts. He led the operation to conquer Ras Sedr in the Sinai. In 1968, he was appointed deputy commander of the Reserve Paratroopers Brigade and in 1969, he became commander of the Jordan Valley Regional Brigade. During the War of Attrition, his brigade pursued militant squads attempting to infiltrate from Jordan. He became commander of the Reserve Paratroopers Brigade in 1970.

Levy was appointed head of the Central Command staff in 1973 and served as head of the operations department of the General Staff in 1974. In 1976, he commanded the 880th Reserve Armored Division, and was appointed head of Central Command in 1977, serving in this position until 1981. Levy served as Deputy Chief of Staff and head of the Operations Division from 1982 to 1983. During his tenure, the First Lebanon War broke out and he took an active part in the management of the war alongside Chief of Staff Rafael Eitan.

Levy was promoted to Chief of Staff in 1983, succeeding Eitan. During his tenure, he presided over the IDF withdrawal in Lebanon in 1985 and oversaw the redeployment of Israeli troops and the creation of the security zone in South Lebanon.

Levy helped to build the IDF ground forces branch. He created two new infantry brigades: the Nahal Brigade and Givati Brigade. During his tenure as Chief of Staff, he presided over Operation Wooden Leg, the Israeli raid on the PLO headquarters in Tunis and the airlifting of Ethiopian Jews to Israel in Operation Moses and Operation Joshua.

While serving as Chief of Staff and after retiring from the army, Levy lived in Kibbutz Beit Alfa in northern Israel. In his last years, he was the founding chairperson of the supervisory board of Highway 6, also known as the Trans-Israel Highway.

Levy was married twice and was survived by five children and five grandchildren.

In 2002, Levy suffered a stroke and was hospitalized at Sheba Medical Center. He was left with limited mobility and relied on a wheelchair, but continued to remain in the public eye. On January 1, 2008, Levy suffered a massive stroke and was hospitalized at HaEmek Medical Center in Afula. He died eight days later of a brain aneurysm. He was buried at Kibbutz Beit Alfa. His funeral was attended by government officials and hundreds who knew and worked with him. Eight generals served as his pallbearers.

== Popular culture ==
In a sketch by the HaGashash HaHiver comedy trio, Moshe Levy is referred to as Musa Wanus (Moshe and a half in Arabic).

In 2008, the Israel Coins and Medals Corporation produced a set of three medals (in gold, silver, and tombac) with his portrait.

== See also ==
- List of Israel's Chiefs of the General Staff
