= Meir Shamgar =

Former President of the Supreme Court of Israel

- מאיר שמגר
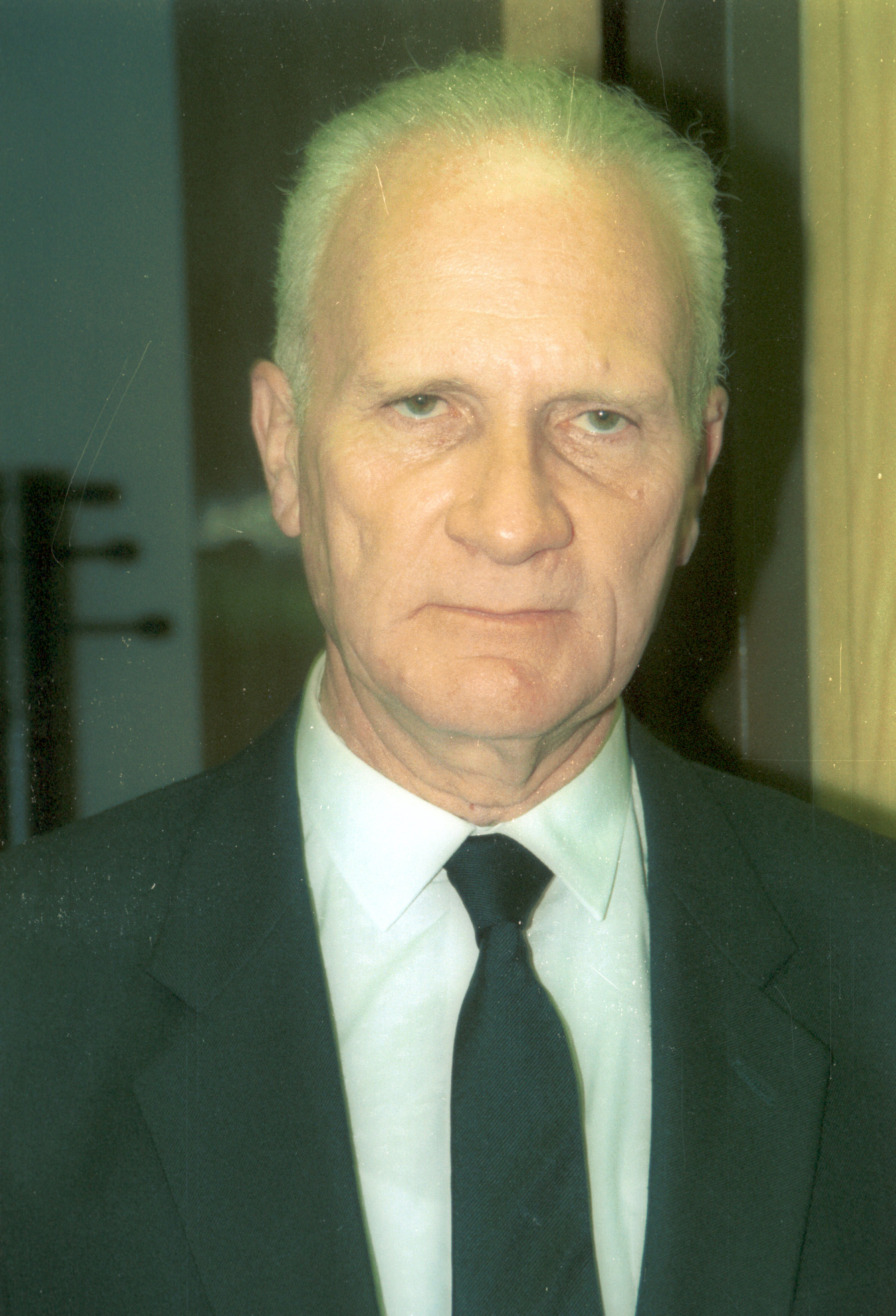
- Born: August 13, 1925; Danzig, Free City of Danzig
- Died: October 18, 2019 (aged 94); Israel
- Citizenship: Israeli
- Education: Hebrew University of Jerusalem; University of London
- Employer: Israeli Supreme Court
- Title: President of the Supreme Court (1983–1995)
- Parent(s): Eliezer and Dina Sterenberg
- Awards: 1996 Israel Prize for special contribution to society and the State of Israel

Signature
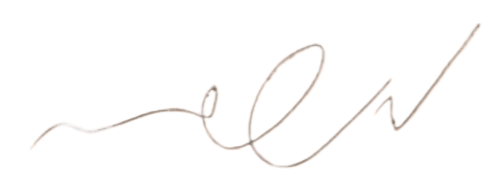

Meir Shamgar (Hebrew: מאיר שמגר; August 13, 1925 – October 18, 2019) was the president of the Israeli Supreme Court from 1983 to 1995.

== Biography ==
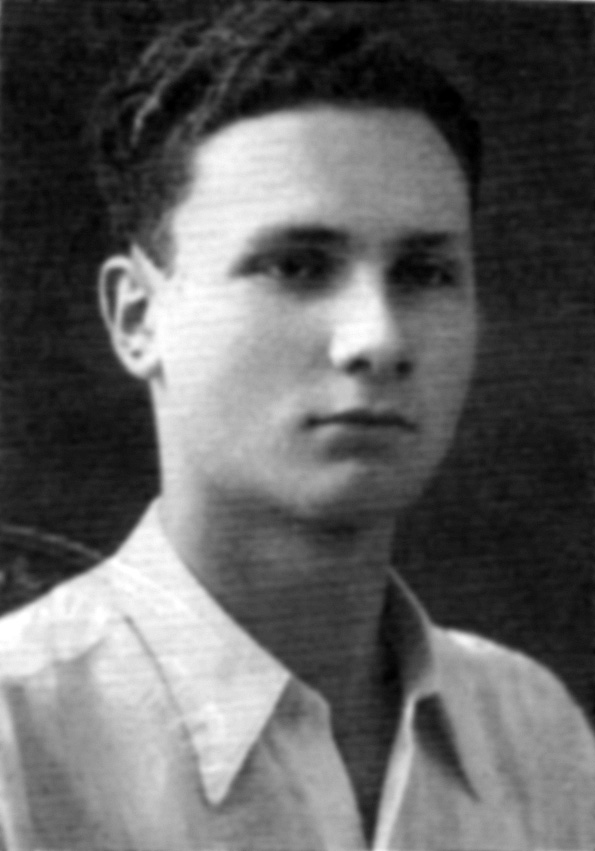
Shamgar at the age of 18

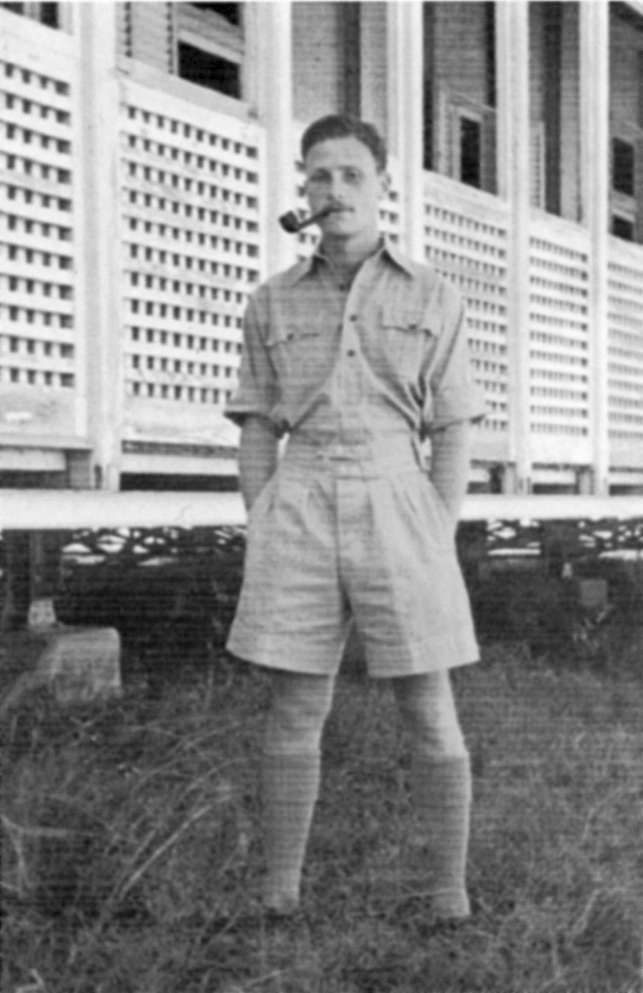
Shamgar in detention in Eritrea, 1946

Meir Shamgar (Sterenberg or Sternberg) was born in the Free City of Danzig (present-day Gdańsk, Poland) to Eliezer and Dina Sterenberg. His parents were Revisionist Zionists. He immigrated to Palestine in 1939. He attended high school at the Balfour Gymnasium in Tel Aviv.

He joined the Palmach and served in Company D. He then joined the Irgun. He was arrested in 1944 for anti-British activities, and interned in Africa at a detention camp in Eritrea. While in detention in Eritrea he studied law by a correspondence course with the University of London. Fellow inmates in Eritrea included Yitzhak Shamir and Shmuel Tamir. He participated in an escape attempt.

In 1948, with the establishment of Israel, he was returned to Israel with the other detainees, where he enlisted in the Israel Defense Forces and participated in the 1948 Arab–Israeli War.

After the war, he studied history and philosophy at the Hebrew University of Jerusalem and law at the Government Law School of the University of London.

Shamgar died on 18 October 2019 at the age of 94.

== Legal career ==
Following his studies, Shamgar rejoined the army as a military prosecutor. He was appointed Deputy Military Advocate General in 1956, and Military Advocate General in 1961. Following the Six-Day War, he designed the legal infrastructure of the Israeli military government in the West Bank and Gaza Strip. He attained the rank of Brigadier General. After retiring from the military, he served as Attorney General from 1968 to 1975. In 1975, he was appointed a justice of the Israeli Supreme Court. In 1982, he was appointed Deputy President of the Supreme Court, and in 1983, he became the chief justice of the Supreme Court. He retired in 1995.

In 1996, Shamgar chaired the Commission of Inquiry into the murder of Prime Minister Yitzhak Rabin.

== Personal life ==
Shamgar had three children with his wife Geula, who died in 1983. After her death, he married Michal Rubinstein, a retired judge who served as Vice President of the Tel Aviv District Court.

== See also ==
- List of Israel Prize recipients
