= List of Israeli films =

This is a chronological list of lists of films produced in Israel split by decade. There may be an overlap between Israeli and foreign films which are sometimes co-produced; nevertheless, the lists should attempt to document mainly the Israeli produced films or the films which are strongly associated with the Israeli culture.

For a detailed alphabetical list of Israeli films currently covered on Wikipedia see Category:Israeli films.

== 20th century ==
- List of Israeli films before 1960
- 1948
- 1949
- 1950
- 1951
- 1955
- 1956
- 1959
- 1960
- 1961
- 1962
- 1963
- 1964
- 1965
- 1966
- 1967
- 1968
- 1969
- 1970
- 1971
- 1972
- 1973
- 1974
- 1975
- 1976
- 1977
- 1978
- 1979
- 1980
- 1981
- 1982
- 1983
- 1984
- 1985
- 1986
- 1987
- 1988
- 1989
- 1990
- 1991
- 1992
- 1993
- 1994
- 1995
- 1996
- 1997
- 1998
- 1999

== 21st century ==
- 2000
- 2001
- 2002
- 2003
- 2004
- 2005
- 2006
- 2007
- 2008
- 2009
- 2010
- 2011
- 2012
- 2013
- 2014
- 2015
- 2016
- 2017
- 2018
- 2019
- 2020
- 2021
- 2022
- 2023
- 2024
- 2025
- 2026
