= 1969 in Israel =

- Decades: 1940s; 1950s; 1960s; 1970s; 1980s
- See also: History of Israel; Timeline of Israeli history; List of years in Israel

Events in the year 1969 in Israel.

== Incumbents ==
- President of Israel – Zalman Shazar
- Prime Minister of Israel – Levi Eshkol (Alignment) until 26 February, Yigal Allon (Alignment) until 17 March, Golda Meir (Alignment)
- President of the Supreme Court – Shimon Agranat
- Chief of General Staff – Haim Bar-Lev
- Government of Israel – 13th Government of Israel until 17 March, 14th Government of Israel until 15 December, 15th Government of Israel

== Events ==
- 1 January – Two killed and dozens wounded during the first Katyusha attack on Kiryat Shmona from Lebanese territory.
- 26 February – Israeli Prime Minister Levi Eshkol dies of a heart attack. Following the death of Eshkol, Yigal Allon is appointed as the acting prime minister of Israel and held office until 17 March.
- 17 March – Golda Meir is elected Prime Minister of Israel. The 14th Government is approved that day and the members are sworn in.
- 8 July – A series of air battles takes place over the Golan Heights and Damascus, as part of the War of Attrition, during which seven Syrian MIGs are shot down.
- July – The 1969 Maccabiah Games are held. for the first time in history Republic of the Congo participates in the games, West Germany and Greece returned to the games. Mark Spitz won 6 golden madels and was declared the best sportsman in the competition.
- 9 September – Operation Raviv: During the War of Attrition, an IDF armored force is landed on the Egyptian shore of the Suez Canal disguised as an Egyptian military force, inside six Egyptian tanks and three Egyptian armoured personnel carriers which had previously been captured by the IDF. Masquerading as an Egyptian force, the raiders meet no significant resistance. The IDF armored force raids Egyptian military bases along the west coast of the Gulf of Suez attacking Egyptian radar stations, military vehicles and other military targets. The Egyptian Army suffers an estimated 100-200 casualties and had 12 outposts destroyed. The Israeli forces suffers no losses.
- 15 september-Moshav Ohad began its populating process. moshav Ohad was fownded in 1966 but it's populating process was frozen in 1967 during The Six Day War before any femilies could settle there, so setteling began on september 15th 1969.
- 28 October – The Alignment party led by Golda Meir wins the seventh Israeli legislative election.
- 15 December – Golda Meir presents her cabinet for a Knesset "Vote of Confidence". The 15th Government is approved that day and the members are sworn in.

=== Israeli–Palestinian conflict ===
The most prominent events related to the Israeli–Palestinian conflict which occurred during 1969 include:

Notable Palestinian militant operations against Israeli targets

The most prominent Palestinian terror attacks committed against Israelis during 1969 include:

- 18 February – El Al Flight 432 attack: Four members of the Popular Front for the Liberation of Palestine, machine-gun El Al's flight 432, a Boeing 707 preparing for takeoff at the Kloten Airport near Zürich. Several crew members are wounded in the attack and damage is caused to the plane. The co-pilot, who was severally wounded, dies from his wounds a month later.
- 20 February – Members of the Popular Front for the Liberation of Palestine bomb a Jerusalem supermarket; two Israelis are killed and twenty others are wounded.
- 29 August – TWA Flight 840 hijacking: A PFLP terrorist cell led by Leila Khaled hijacks TWA Flight 840 on its way from Los Angeles to Tel Aviv, diverting the Boeing 707 to Damascus. Two Israeli passengers are held captive for 98 days in a Syrian prison and released eventually in a prisoner exchange deal that took place on 7 December 1969. According to several unverified media reports, the hijackers main aim was to kidnap the Israeli ambassador to the United States, Yitzhak Rabin, whom the hijacking planner mistakenly believed would be on this flight.

Notable Israeli military operations against Palestinian militancy targets

The most prominent Israeli military counter-terrorism operations (military campaigns and military operations) carried out against Palestinian militants during 1969 include:

== Notable births ==
- 2 February – Dana International, Israeli singer.
- 20 June – Yuval Semo, Israeli actor and comedian.
- 23 June – Achinoam Nini, Israeli singer.
- 28 June – Ayelet Zurer, Israeli actress.
- 17 September – Kobi Oz, Israeli singer

== Notable deaths ==
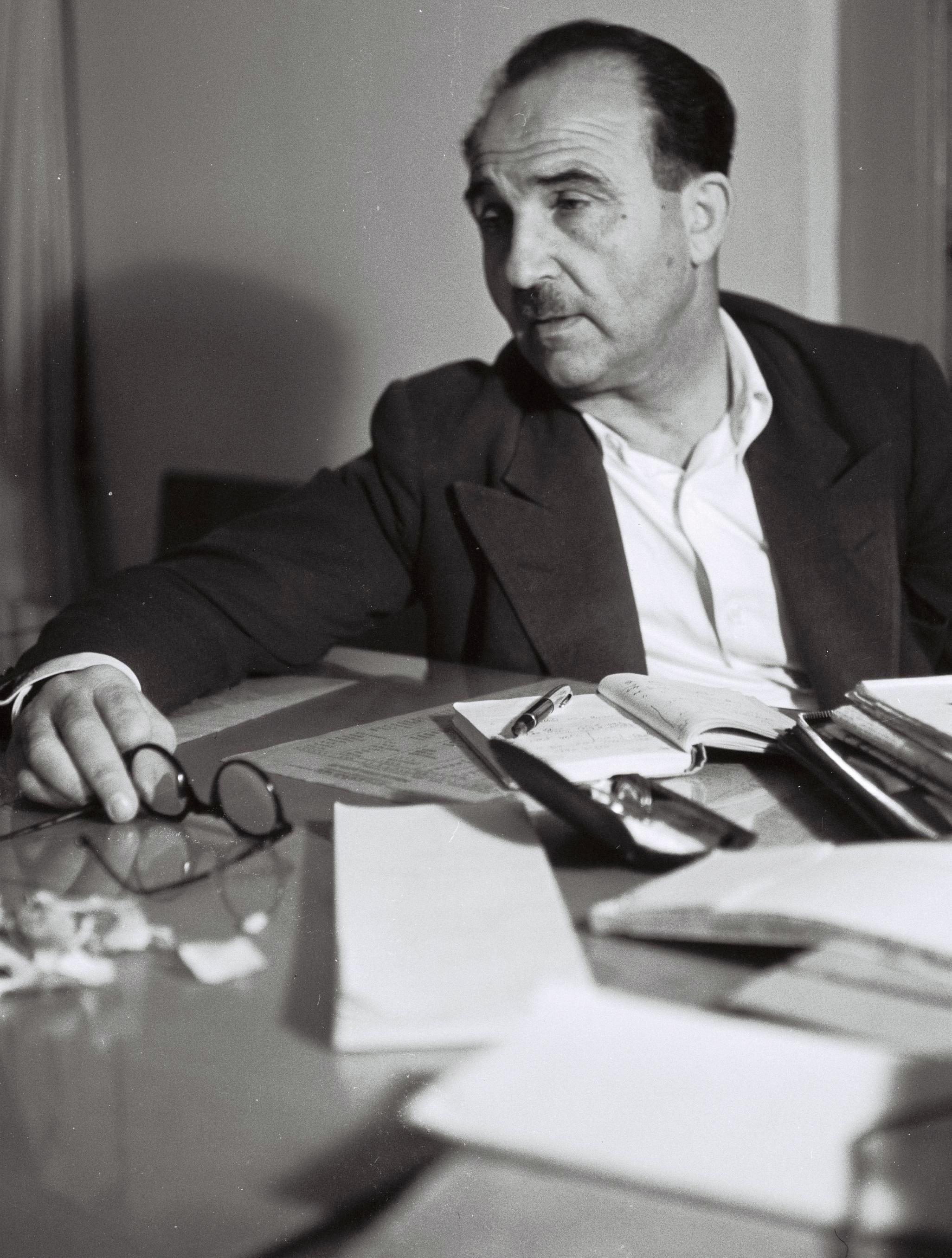
Levi Eshkol

- 8 February – Ovadia Hedaya (born 1889), Syrian-born Israeli rabbi.
- 12 February – Paltiel Daykan (born 1885), Russian (Lithuania)-born Israeli jurist.
- 26 February – Levi Eshkol (born 1895), Russian (Ukraine)-born Prime Minister of Israel.
- 22 March – Shoshana Parsitz (born 1892), Russian (Poland)-born Zionist activist, educator and Israeli politician.
- 24 March – Abba Hushi (born 1898), Austro-Hungarian (Galicia)-born Israeli politician.
- 2 September – Amos de-Shalit (born 1926), Israeli nuclear physicist.
- 7 November – Yehuda Burla (born 1886), Israeli author.

== See also ==
- 1969 in Israeli film
