= Ziv =

Ziv (Hebrew: זיו) is a Hebrew language word and name meaning "radiance" or "splendor" and may refer to:

== People ==
=== Surname ===
- Abraham Ziv (1940–2013), Israeli mathematician
- Amitai Ziv, (born 1958), Israeli physician
- Asaiah Ziv (born 1996), American hip hop musician
- Frederick Ziv (1905–2001), American broadcasting producer, founder of Ziv Television Programs
- Imri Ziv (born 1991), Israeli singer and actor
- Israel Ziv (born 1957), Israel general
- Jacob Ziv (1931-2023), Israeli computer scientist
- Simcha Zissel Ziv (1824–1898), Russian rabbi and a leader of the Musar movement
- Yiftach Ziv (born 1995), Israeli basketball player
- Yitzhak Ziv (born 1937), Israeli politician
- Yoav Ziv (born 1981), Israeli football player

=== Given name ===
- Ziv Bar-Joseph (born 1971), Israeli computational biologist
- Ziv Berkovich (born 1984), Israeli cinematographer and screenwriter
- Ziv Better (born 1965), Israeli swimmer
- Ziv Kalontarov (born 1997), Israeli swimmer
- Ziv Koren (born 1970), Israeli photojournalist
- Ziv Rubinstein (born 1970), Israeli musician

== Places ==
- Neve Ziv, also known as Ziv HaGalil, a community settlement in northern Israel
- Ziv Medical Center, or Rebecca Sieff Hospital, a hospital in Safed, Israel

== Other uses ==
- Iyar, a Hebrew month, called Ziv in the Bible
- Ziv Television Programs, an American company that produced syndicated television programs.
- Zeiss Ikon Voigtländer (ZIV), a unit of Carl Zeiss AG that was responsible for developing and marketing the Icarex line of SLR cameras (1966–72)

== See also ==
- Ziwa (Aramaic) (Aramaic cognate)
