= 1964 in Israel =

- Decades: 1940s; 1950s; 1960s; 1970s; 1980s
- See also: History of Israel; Timeline of Israeli history; List of years in Israel

Events in the year 1964 in Israel.

== Incumbents ==
- Prime Minister of Israel – Levi Eshkol (Mapai)
- President of Israel – Zalman Shazar
- President of the Supreme Court – Yitzhak Olshan
- Chief of General Staff – Tzvi Tzur until 1 January, Yitzhak Rabin
- Government of Israel – 11th Government of Israel until 22 December, 12th Government of Israel

== Events ==
- 1 January – Yitzhak Rabin is appointed as the seventh Chief of Staff of the Israel Defense Forces.
- 5 January – Pope Paul VI arrives in Israel, marking the first visit to Israel by the head of the Roman Catholic Church.
- 29 April – A Nord 2501D Noratlas (4X-FAD/044) of the IAF crashes into a mountain near Mitzpe Ramon, killing all 9 occupants. The crash is currently Israel's deadliest.
- 3 June – Israel wins the 1964 AFC Asian Cup. The finals were held in Israel from 26 May to 9 June 1964 and the Israeli national football team won the title with a perfect record of three wins, defeating the teams of South Korea, Hong Kong, and India.
- 10 June – The National Water Carrier of Israel is inaugurated.
- 16 June – Israel's Knesset passes The President of the State Law.
- 9 July – The remains of the Revisionist Zionist leader Ze'ev Jabotinsky are transferred to Israel for burial in Jerusalem at Mount Herzl Cemetery from his original burial site in New York.
- 22 December – Levi Eshkol presents his cabinet for a Knesset "Vote of Confidence". The 12th Government is approved that day and the members are sworn in.

=== Israeli–Palestinian conflict ===
The most prominent events related to the Israeli–Palestinian conflict which occurred in 1964 include:

- 2 June – The Palestine Liberation Organization (PLO) was founded in the West Bank with the stated goal of the "liberation of Palestine" through armed struggle. The original PLO Charter (issued on 28 May 1964) stated that "Palestine with its boundaries that existed at the time of the British mandate is an integral regional unit" and sought to "prohibit... the existence and activity" of Zionism. It also called for a right of return and self-determination for Palestinian Arabs. The PLO was considered by the United States and Israel to be a terrorist organization until the Madrid Conference in 1991.

Notable Palestinian militant operations against Israeli targets

The most prominent Palestinian terror attacks committed against Israelis during 1964 include:

Notable Israeli military operations against Palestinian militancy targets
The most prominent Israeli military counter-terrorism operations (military campaigns and military operations) carried out against Palestinian militants during 1964 include:

== Notable births ==
- 1 February – Eli Ohana, Israeli football manager and former football player.
- 10 May – Orna Datz, Israeli singer, actress and television presenter
- 26 August – Zadok Malka, Israeli footballer
- 12 December – Bonni Ginzburg, Israeli goalkeeper.
- 30 December – Keren Mor, Israeli actress.

== Notable deaths ==
- 16 January – Aharon Zisling (born 1901), Russian (Belarus)-born Israeli politician and minister.
- 10 April – Ze'ev Shefer (born 1906), Russian (Ukraine)-born Israeli politician.
- 6 August – Jeremiah Halpern (born 1901), Russian-born Revisionist Zionist leader.
- 20 August – Avraham Drori (born 1919), Polish-born Israeli politician.

== See also ==
- 1964 in Israeli film
- Israel at the 1964 Summer Olympics
