= List of Israeli films of 1968 =

A list of films produced by the Israeli film industry in 1968.

== 1968 releases ==
Premiere	Title	Director	Cast	Genre	Notes	Ref
?	Tevye and His Seven Daughters (Hebrew: טוביה ושבע בנותיו)	Menahem Golan	Shmuel Rodensky	Drama, Musical		
?	Kol Mamzer Melech (Hebrew: כל ממזר מלך, lit. "Every Bastard a King")	Uri Zohar		Drama		
?	Sinai Commandos (Hebrew: המטרה טיראן)	Raphael Nussbaum	Robert Fuller	War	Israeli-American- West German co-production	
?	Ha-Shehuna Shelanu (Hebrew: השכונה שלנו, lit. "Our Neighborhood")	Uri Zohar		Comedy, Drama		
?	Ha-Ben Ha'Oved (Hebrew: הבן העובד, lit. "The Prodigal Son")	Yosef Shalhin, Alfred Steinhardt		Drama		

== See also ==
- 1968 in Israel
