= Broken Barriers =

Broken Barriers may refer to:

- Broken Barriers (1919 film), an American Yiddish film
- Broken Barriers (1924 film), an American silent film
- Broken Barriers (1928 film), an American silent drama film
- Broken Barriers (novel), a 1938 novel by Barbara Cartland
