= 1970 in Israel =

- Decades: 1950s; 1960s; 1970s; 1980s; 1990s
- See also: History of Israel; Timeline of Israeli history; List of years in Israel

Events in the year 1970 in Israel.

== Incumbents ==
- President of Israel – Zalman Shazar
- Prime Minister of Israel – Golda Meir (Alignment)
- President of the Supreme Court – Shimon Agranat
- Chief of General Staff – Haim Bar-Lev
- Government of Israel – 15th Government of Israel

== Events ==
- 22 January – War of Attrition: The IDF launches Operation Rhodes, a heliborne raid against the Egyptian island of Shadwan. Israeli paratroopers and Shayetet-13 naval commandos take control of the island for 36 hours before leaving with 62 captured Egyptian soldiers and radar equipment.
- 24 January - An accident occurs in the military section of the Port of Eilat in which a truck loaded with ammunition explodes, killing 21 and injuring dozens more.
- 30 July – War of Attrition: A large-scale dogfight, codenamed Rimon 20, takes place west of the Suez Canal, in which Israeli pilots down five Soviet-piloted MiGs, while the Israeli Air Force suffers no casualties except a damaged Mirage.
- 7 August – The War of Attrition ends as a cease-fire agreement is reached.
- 30 December – The Neot HaKikar disaster (אסון נאות הכיכר): the worst natural disaster since the founding of the State of Israel. A rock detaches from a cliff due to heavy rains and crushes an IDF military base dining room. 20 Israelis are killed in the disaster (19 soldiers and a civilian) and ten soldiers were injured (three of them severely).

=== Israeli–Palestinian conflict ===
The most prominent events related to the Israeli–Palestinian conflict which occurred during 1970 include:

Notable Palestinian militant operations against Israeli targets

The most prominent Palestinian Arab terror attacks committed against Israelis during 1970 include:

- 10 February – An unsuccessful plane hijack attempt in which Palestinian Arab militants from the Popular Front for the Liberation of Palestine attack a bus containing El Al passengers at Munich airport, killing one passenger and wounding 11 (among them Israeli actress Hanna Maron).
- 21 February – A mid-air bomb explosion cripples Swissair Flight 330 nine minutes after take-off from Zürich to Tel Aviv. Forty-seven people die when the aircraft crashes while attempting an emergency landing at Zürich, of whom 15 are Israelis. The Palestinian Popular Front for the Liberation of Palestine organization claims responsibility for the attack.
- 4 May – Two armed Palestinians break into the Israeli Embassy in Asunción, Paraguay, and open fire with pistols, killing one person and seriously wounding another.
- 22 May – Avivim school bus massacre: Palestinian Arab militants from the Palestine Liberation Organization attack the community school bus from the Israeli moshav Avivim, killing nine children and three adults, and crippling for life 19 children.
- 6 September - Dawson's Field hijackings: simultaneous attempts to hijack four airliners by Palestinian militants belonging to the PFLP. Two planes landed in Dawson's Field, a remote desert airstrip in Jordan. A hijacking attempt on an El Al flight was thwarted and an American hijacked plane is diverted to Cairo and blown up after the passengers evacuated.
- 9 September - Dawson's Field hijackings: A BOAC flight is hijacked by a PFLP sympathizer and diverted to the airstrip in Jordan.
- 11 September – Dawson's Field hijackings: The Dawson's Field hijackers release 88 of their hostages. The remaining hostages, mostly Jews and Israeli citizens, are held until 25 September.
- 12 September – Dawson's Field hijackings: the PFLP used explosives to destroy the three empty planes, as they anticipated a counterstrike.
- 7 November 1970 bombing of Tel Aviv Central Bus Station kills 1 injures 24.

Notable Israeli military operations against Palestinian militancy targets

The most prominent Israeli military counter-terrorism operations (military campaigns and military operations) carried out against Palestinian militants during 1970 include:

=== Unknown dates ===
- The founding of the moshav Tzofar.
- The relocation of Palestinians to South America

== Notable births ==
- 10 January – Ariel Horowitz, Israeli singer and songwriter.
- 14 January – Nili Abramski, Israeli long distance runner.
- 20 March – Ziv Rubinstein, Israeli songwriter
- 23 May – Yigal Amir, assassin of Israeli Prime Minister Yitzhak Rabin.
- 20 April – Avishai Cohen (bassist), Israeli jazz double bassist, composer, singer, and arranger.
- 20 June – Oren Smadja, Israeli Olympic judoka.
- 8 July – Assaf Bernstein, Israeli film writer, director, and producer.
- 1 August – Elon Lindenstrauss, Israeli mathematician and first Israeli recipient of the Fields Medal.
- 21 September – Mosh Ben-Ari, Israeli singer.
- 30 September – Gilad Erdan, Israeli Minister of Environmental Protection.
- 2 November – Dana Berger, Israeli singer.
- 13 November – Ariel Atias, Israeli Minister of Housing and Construction
- 21 November – Alma Zack, Israeli actress and comedian.
- 23 November – Oded Fehr, Israeli film and television actor.
- Full date unknown
  - Dorit Aharonov – Israeli computer scientist.
  - Alon Goldstein – Israeli classical pianist.

== Notable deaths ==
- 15 January – Leah Goldberg (born 1911), German-born Israeli poet, author, playwright, translator, and researcher of Hebrew literature.
- 18 January – Hanoch Yelon (born 1886), Austro-Hungarian (Galicia)-born Israeli linguist and leading Talmudic researcher.
- 29 January – Aryeh Ben-Eliezer (born 1913), Russian (Lithuania)-born a Revisionist Zionist leader, Irgun member and Israeli politician.
- 17 February – Shmuel Yosef Agnon (born 1888), Austro-Hungarian (Galicia)-born Israeli author and Nobel Prize laureate.
- 28 March – Nathan Alterman (born 1910), Russian (Poland)-born Israeli poet, playwright, journalist and translator.
- 3 April – Avigdor Hameiri (born 1890), Austro-Hungarian (Carpathian Ruthenia)-born Israeli author.
- 9 June – Yeshayahu Forder (born 1901), German-born Israeli lawyer and politician.
- 12 June – Yisrael Barzilai (born 1913), Polish-born Israeli politician.
- 16 July – Haim-Moshe Shapira (born 1902), Russian (Poland)-born Israeli politician.
- 7 August – Eliezer Steinman (born 1892), Russian (Poland/Ukraine)-born Israeli writer, journalist and editor.
- 6 September – Zalman Aran (born 1899), Russian (Ukraine)-born Zionist activist, educator and Israeli politician.
- 7 September – Yitzhak Gruenbaum (born 1897), Russian (Poland)-Zionist leader and the first Interior Minister of Israel.
- 11 September – Moshe Kelmer (born 1901), Polish-born Israeli politician.
- 13 September – Emanuel Goldberg (born 1881), Russian-born Israeli chemist.

== See also ==
- 1970 in Israeli film
