= List of Israeli films of 1971 =

A list of films produced by the Israeli film industry in 1971.

== 1971 releases ==
Premiere	Title	Director	Cast	Genre	Notes	Ref
?	The Policeman (Hebrew: השוטר אזולאי, lit. "The Policeman Azulai")	Ephraim Kishon	Shaike Ophir	Comedy, Drama		
?	Malkat Hakvish (Hebrew: מלכת הכביש, lit. "The Highway Queen")	Menahem Golan	Gila Almagor, Yehuda Barkan	Drama		
?	Fifty Fifty (Hebrew: חצי חצי)	Boaz Davidson		Drama		
?	Hasamba (Hebrew: חסמב"ה)	Joel Silberg	Shlomo Artzi, Ze'ev Revach and Dubi Gal	Drama		
?	Fishke Bemilu'im (Hebrew: פישקה במילואים, lit. "Fishke Goes to the Reserves")	George Obadiah		Drama		
?	Katz V'Carasso (Hebrew: כץ וקראסו, lit. "Katz and Carasso")	Menahem Golan	Joseph Shiloach and Shmuel Rodensky	Drama		
?	The Hero (Hebrew: בלומפילד, lit. "Bloomfield")	Richard Harris and Uri Zohar	Richard Harris	Drama	An Israeli-British co-production; Entered into the 21st Berlin International Film Festival	
?	Ariana (Hebrew: אריאנה)	George Obadiah		Drama		
?	Ha-Tarnegol (Hebrew: התרנגול, lit. "The Rooster")	Uri Zohar	Chaim Topol	Drama		
?	Harpatka'ot Yaldei Hahof (Hebrew: הרפתקאות ילדי החוף, lit. "Adventures of the Beach youth")	Armin Dahlen		Drama		

== See also ==
- 1971 in Israel
