= 1971 in Israel =

- Decades: 1950s; 1960s; 1970s; 1980s; 1990s
- See also: History of Israel; Timeline of Israeli history; List of years in Israel

Events in the year 1971 in Israel.

== Incumbents ==
- President of Israel – Zalman Shazar
- Prime Minister of Israel – Golda Meir (Alignment)
- President of the Supreme Court – Shimon Agranat
- Chief of General Staff – Haim Bar-Lev
- Government of Israel – 15th Government of Israel

== Events ==
- 12 January – Security forces arrest approximately 60 suspected espionage and sabotage operatives in Judea and Samaria.
- 15 January – The Israeli Defense Forces (IDF) kills 10 militants in raids on multiple bases near Sidon in southern Lebanon; six soldiers are injured.
- 3 March – The Israeli Black Panther Party (IBPP) holds its first public protest outside a municipal building in Jerusalem, demonstrating against housing discrimination affecting Mizrahi Jews, and demanding the release of activists arrested in police raids.
- 11 April – Members of the IBPP stage a hunger strike at the Western Wall in Jerusalem to demand meetings with government officials over poverty, housing inequality, and social discrimination.
- 15 May – Three members of the Turkish Liberation Army, an underground militant organization linked to the PLO, kidnapped and executed Israeli consul-general Efraim Elrom in Ankara.
- 4 June – Israel announces the exposure of a Syrian espionage network in the Golan Heights.
- 12 July – The Jordanian army launches a major operation against Palestinian militants, as the Cairo Agreement is annulled.
- 23 August – The IBPP hold a protest in Zion Square, burning an effigy of Prime Minister Meir in the process.
- 13 October – Two Israeli soldiers are killed by a mine in the Golan Heights.

== Notable births ==
- 15 January – Inbal Perlmutter, Israeli musician (died 1997).
- 30 January – Assaf Amdursky, Israeli singer.
- 13 February – Alon Harazi, Israeli footballer.
- 7 March – Tal Banin, Israeli footballer.
- 12 April – Eyal Golan, Israeli singer.

== Notable deaths ==
- 4 April – Shlomo-Yisrael Ben-Meir (born 1910), Russian (Poland)-born Israeli politician.
- 6 June – Yitzhak Tabenkin (born 1888), Russian (Belarus)-born Zionist activist and Israeli politician.
- 10 July – Chaim Sheba (born 1908), Austro-Hungarian (Bukovina)-born Israeli physician.
- 19 July – Eliyahu-Moshe Ganhovsky (born 1901), Russian (Poland)-born Israeli politician and Religious Zionist activist.
- 7 August – Yitzhak-Meir Levin (born 1893), Russian (Poland)-born Haredi Jewish Polish and Israeli politician, an Israeli government minister and a former leader of Agudat Israel.
- 28 August – Reuvein Margolies (born 1889), Austro-Hungarian (Galicia)-born Israeli author and Talmudic scholar.
- 1 September – Mordechai Ofer (born 1924), Polish-born Israeli politician.
- 17 October – Shimon Bejarano (born 1910), Bulgarian-born Israeli politician.
- 12 December – Yechezkel Kutscher (born 1909), Austro-Hungarian (Slovakia)-born Israeli philologist and Hebrew linguist.
- Full date unknown
  - Yehoshua Bertonov (born 1879), Russian (Lithuania)-born Israeli stage actor.
  - Hillel Oppenheimer (born 1899), German-born Israeli professor of botany.

== See also ==
- 1971 in Israeli film
- 1971 in Israeli television
- 1971 in Israeli music
- 1971 in Israeli sport
