= 1967 in Israel =

- Decades: 1940s; 1950s; 1960s; 1970s; 1980s
- See also: History of Israel; Timeline of Israeli history; List of years in Israel

Events in the year 1967 in Israel.

== Incumbents ==
- President of Israel – Zalman Shazar
- Prime Minister of Israel – Levi Eshkol (Alignment)
- President of the Supreme Court – Shimon Agranat
- Chief of General Staff – Yitzhak Rabin
- Government of Israel – 13th Government of Israel

== Events ==
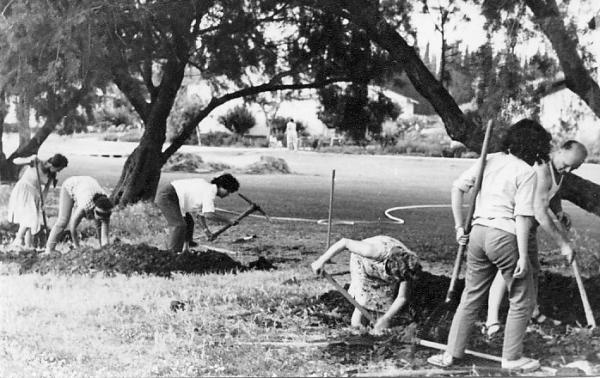
Digging trenches on kibbutz Gan Shmuel before the Six-Day War

- 7 April – a minor Israeli-Syrian border incident escalates into a full-scale aerial battle over the Golan Heights between the Israeli Air Force and the Syrian Air Force. Israel claimed it downed 6 Syrian MiG-21s in three dogfights with no plane loses. Syria claimed it downed 5 Israel Mirages and killed at least 70 Israelis.
- 15 May – 5 June – The "Waiting period":
  - 15 May – In the midst of Israel's Independence Day celebrations, Egyptian ground forces cross the Suez Canal and enter the Sinai peninsula. This move led Israel to an emergency state, known as the "waiting period".
  - 22 May – Egyptian President Gamal Abdel Nasser demands that the UN forces evacuate the Sinai peninsula and the Gaza Strip (who were stationed there to prevent renewed armed conflict between Israel and Egypt).
  - 23 May – President Nasser closes the Straits of Tiran to Israeli shipping, blockading Israel's southern port of Eilat, and Israel's entire Red Sea coastline.
  - 30 May – Jordan and Egypt sign a defense agreement.
  - 3 June – Egypt's Commander-in-Chief issues an order for the day to his troops in Sinai which referenced the importance of "Holy War" and the reconquest of "the plundered soil of Palestine."

Six-Day War:

- 5 June – Israel launches what is widely described as a preemptive strike on Egyptian airfields and armored columns in Gaza and Sinai.
- 6 June – The Battle of Ammunition Hill takes place.
- 6 June – the Gaza Strip was occupied by Israel.
- 7 June – Reunification of Jerusalem as the Old City of Jerusalem is captured by the IDF.
- 8 June – Israeli Air Force attack a U.S. Navy electronic intelligence vessel just outside Egypt's territorial waters in what became known as the USS Liberty incident.
- 8 June – The IDF takes of Sharm el-Sheikh and Al Qantarah El Sharqiyya.
- 9 June – The beginning of the fighting in the Golan Heights.
- 10 June – The Six Day War ends and a ceasefire is signed the following day. The territories held now by Israel expanded significantly ("The Purple Line") and included: the West Bank (including East Jerusalem), Golan Heights, Sinai Peninsula and Gaza, which had been held by Jordan, Syria and Egypt, respectively. The results of the war still affect the geopolitics of the region.
- 10 June – The Moroccan Quarter, an 800-year-old neighborhood in the southeast corner of the Old City of Jerusalem, is demolished by the Israeli government, creating a plaza in front of the Western Wall in order to make public access to the Western Wall easier.
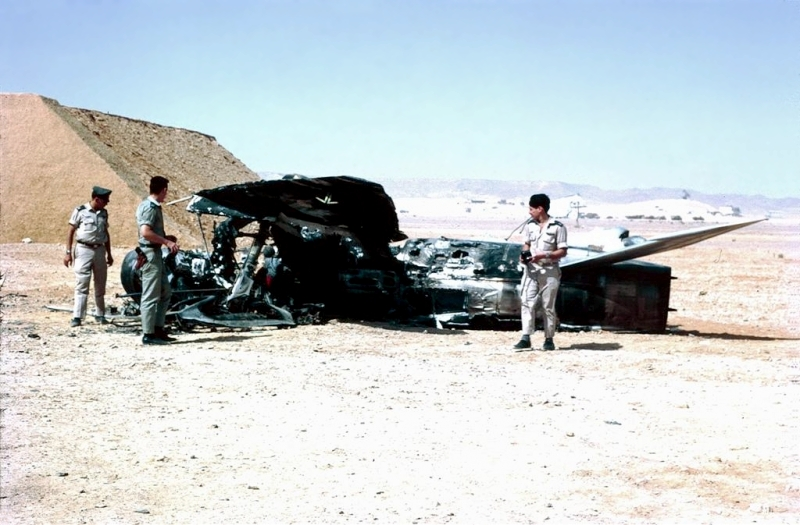
Israeli troops examine a destroyed Egyptian MiG-21 in the Sinai Peninsula, June 1967

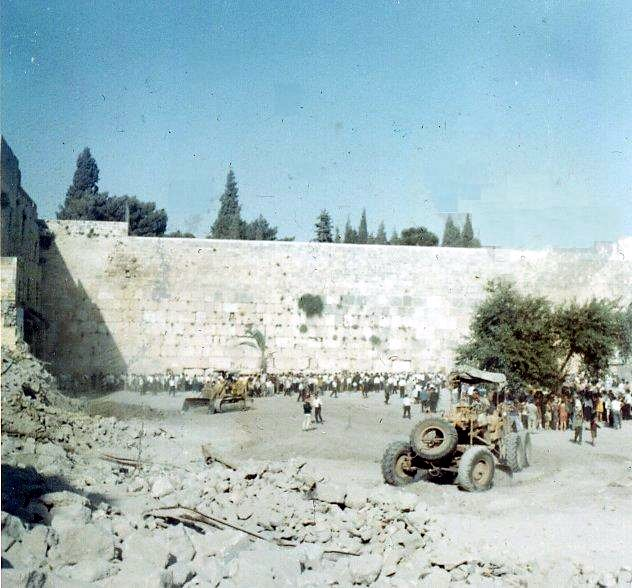
Israeli heavy-duty vehicles clearing up the demolished Moroccan Quarter ruins to create a plaza in front of the Western Wall, July 1967

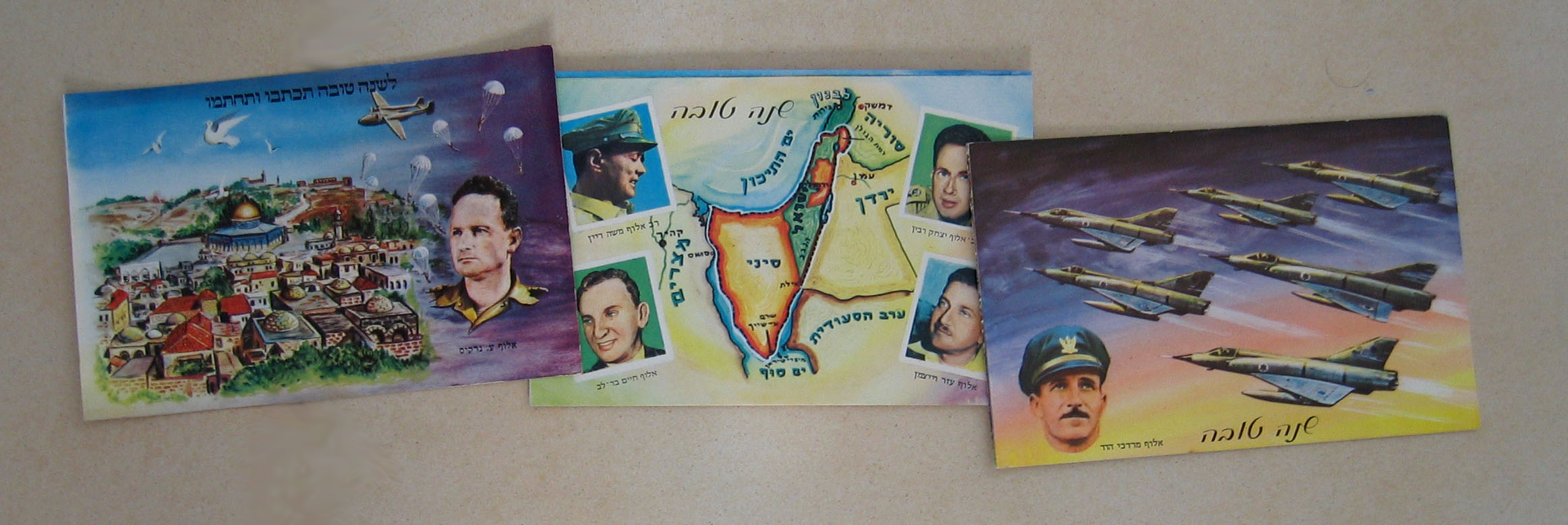
Jewish new year cards with Six-Day War motifs

Post-war:

- 17 June – The Israeli government transfers day-to-day control of the Temple Mount site to the Islamic Waqf.
- 28 June – Israel declares the annexation of East Jerusalem. Arab residents of East Jerusalem are given a permanent resident status in Israel.
- 29 June – Jerusalem was reunified as Israel removed all barriers separating the Old City from the Israeli sector.
- 1 September – The Khartoum Resolution, issued at the conclusion of an Arab League summit in Khartoum, Sudan, adopts the "Three No's" – "no peace with Israel; no recognition of Israel; no negotiations with Israel."
- 21 October – An Egyptian surface-to-surface missile sinks the Israeli destroyer Eilat, killing 47 Israeli sailors. Israel retaliates by shelling Egyptian refineries along the Suez Canal.

=== Israeli–Palestinian conflict ===
The most prominent events related to the Israeli–Palestinian conflict which occurred during 1967 include:

Notable Palestinian militant operations against Israeli targets

The most prominent Palestinian terror attacks committed against Israelis during 1967 include:

- 4 September – Bomb at Tel Aviv central bus station kills one person and injures 72.

Notable Israeli military operations against Palestinian militancy targets

The most prominent Israeli military counter-terrorism operations (military campaigns and military operations) carried out against Palestinian militants during 1967 include:

- 20 August – Israeli army blow up four houses and destroy three others in Abu Dis following an attack on a party of tourists.

== Births ==
- 25 January – Ilan Leibovitch, politician.
- 23 March – Jacky Ben-Zaken, businessman.
- 31 March – Michaela Bercu, model and actress.
- 27 April – Aki Avni, actor, entertainer and a television host.
- 1 May – Yael Arad, Judoka and the first Israeli Olympic medal winner.
- 19 July – Yael Abecassis, actress and model.
- 25 October – Ran Poliakine, entrepreneur, founder and CEO of Powermat Technologies (died 2024).

== Deaths ==
- 28 January – Bechor-Shalom Sheetrit (born 1895), Israeli politician and minister.
- 12 February – Shalom Zisman (born 1914), Russian (Poland)-born Israeli politician.
- 29 March – Isaac Dov Berkowitz (born 1885), Russian (Belarus)-born Israeli author.
- 2 April – Avraham Elmalih (born 1885), Israeli journalist, Zionist activist and politician.
- 5 June – Arthur Biram (born 1878), German-born Israeli philosopher and educator.
- 5 June – Nechemya Cohen (born 1943), the most decorated soldier in the history of the IDF, fell in battle.
- 8 June – Nahum Levin (born 1905), Russian (Belarus)-born Israeli politician.
- 21 December – Ya'akov Katz (born 1906), Austro-Hungarian (Galicia)-born Israeli politician).

== See also ==
- 1967 in Israeli film
