= Tevye =

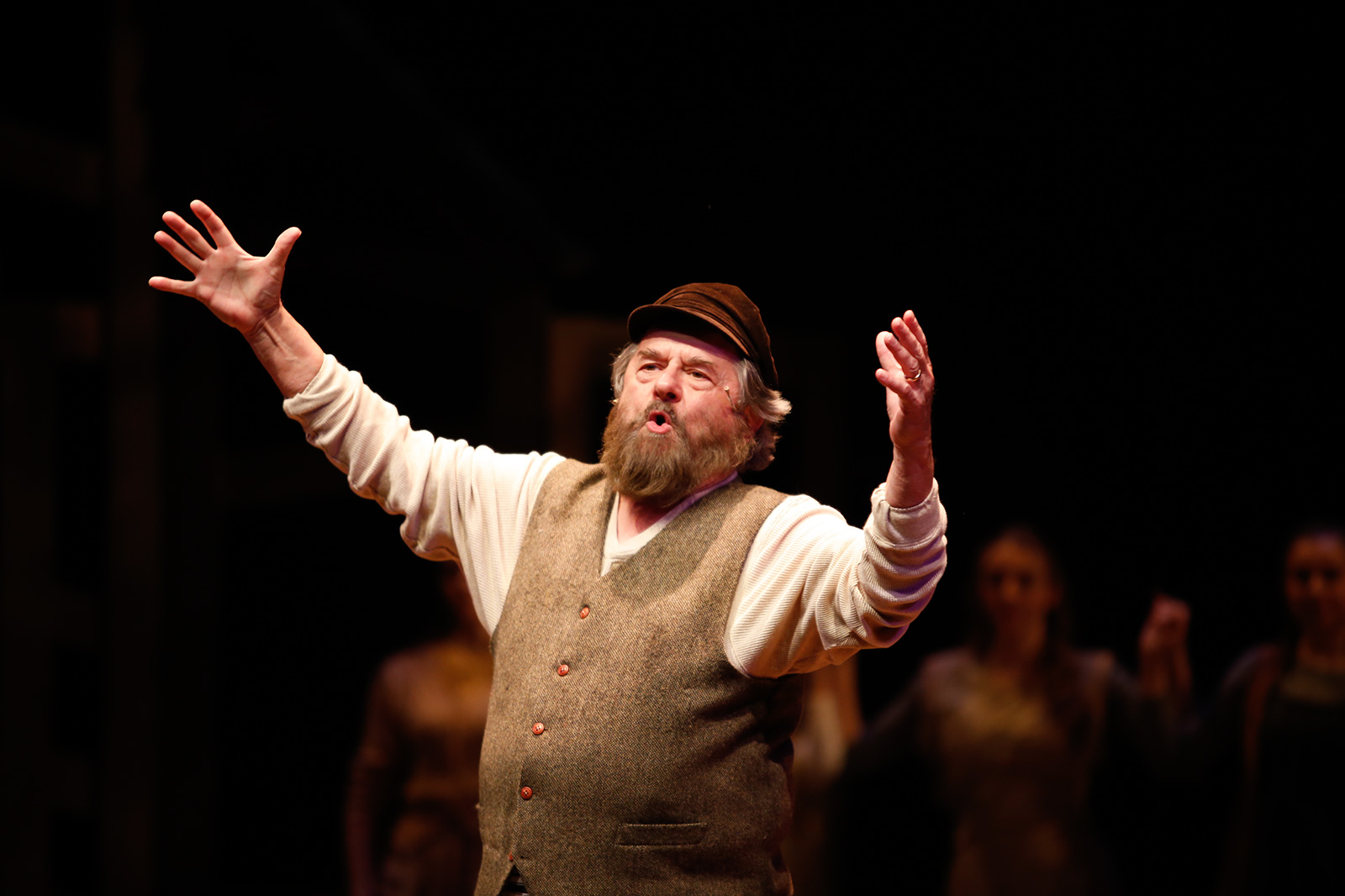
- Actor John Stefano portraying Tevye in Fiddler on the Roof
- First appearance: 'Tevye the Dairyman'; 1894
- Created by: Sholem Aleichem
- Portrayed by: Evgeniy Knyazev; Chaim Topol; Zero Mostel; Theodore Bikel; Shmuel Rodensky; Maurice Schwartz; Luther Adler; Herschel Bernardi; Paul Lipson; Alfred Molina; Harvey Fierstein; Henry Goodman; Danny Burstein; Yehezkel Lazarov; Anthony Warlow; Humberto de Vargas; Steven Skybell; Jacob Medich

In-universe information
- Gender: Male
- Occupation: Milkman
- Spouse: Golde
- Children: 7 daughters, including Tzeitel, Chava, Hodel, Shprintze, Taybele and Bielke
- Religion: Judaism
- Nationality: Citizen of the Russian Empire

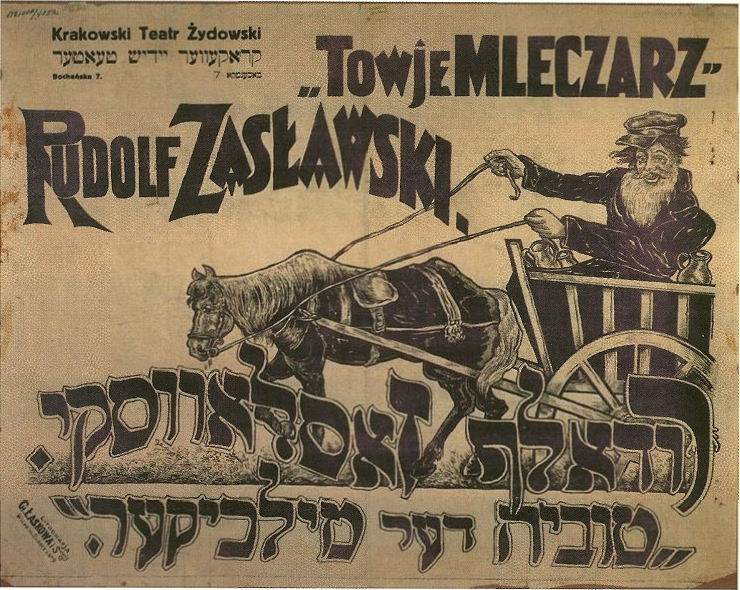
Poster in Kraków for a stage version of Tevye.

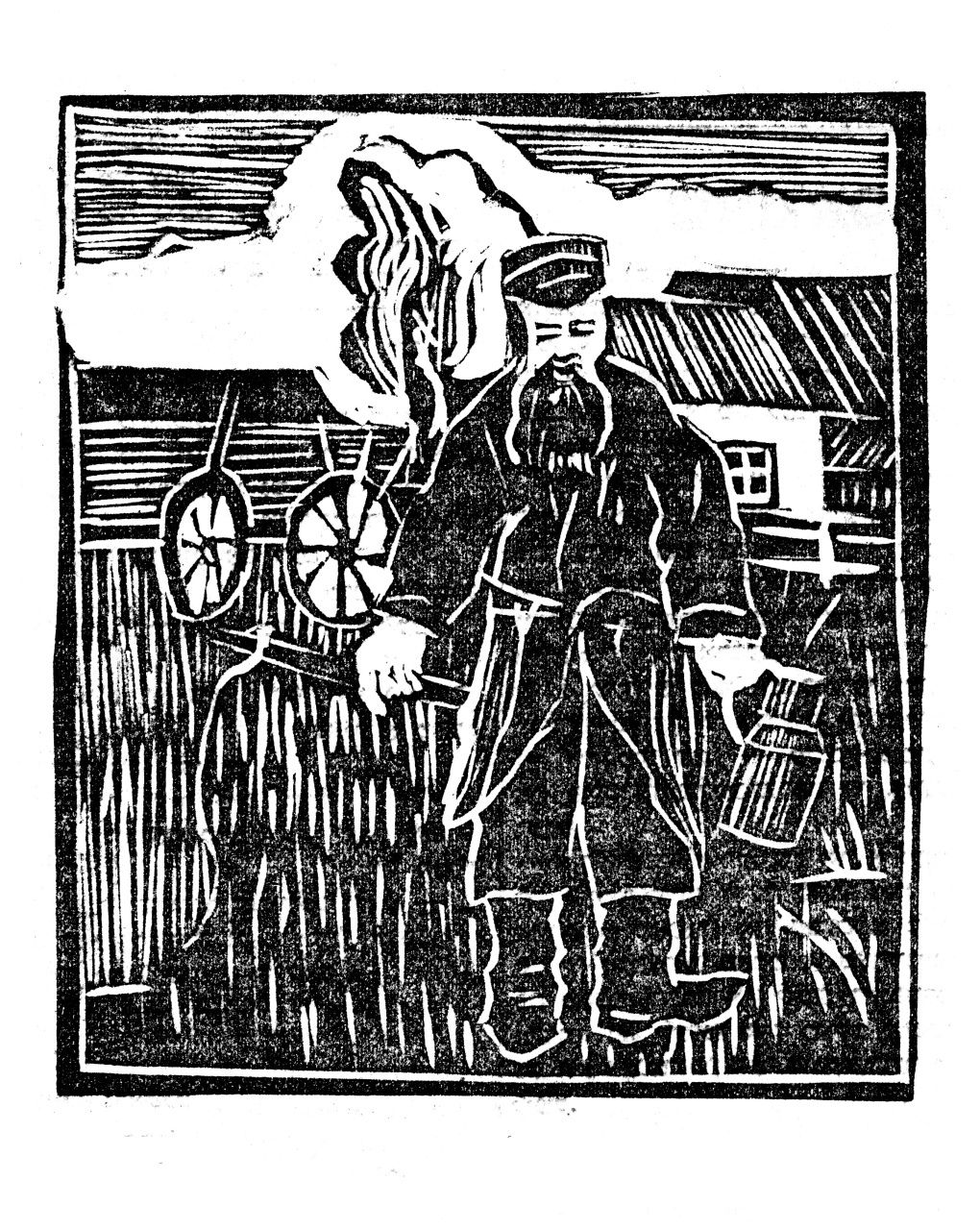
Tevye der milkhiker by Rywka Berger (1934)

Tevye the Dairyman, also translated as Tevye the Milkman (Yiddish: טבֿיה דער מילכיקער, Tevye der milkhiker [ˈtɛvjə ˌdɛr ˈmilxikər]), is the fictional narrator and protagonist of a series of short stories by Sholem Aleichem, and their various adaptations, the most famous being the musical Fiddler on the Roof, which premiered on Broadway in 1964, and its 1971 film adaptation. Tevye is a pious Jewish dairyman living in the Russian Empire, the patriarch of a family including several troublesome daughters. (Note: In the first short story, there is also a mention of a seventh daughter; in Fiddler, however, there are only five daughters (using the first five names listed below), of whom only the first three have major roles.) The village of Boyberik, where the stories are set (renamed Anatevka in Fiddler on the Roof), is based on the town of Boyarka, Ukraine, then part of the Russian Empire. Boyberik is a suburb of Yehupetz (based on Kyiv), where most of Tevye's customers live.

The stories were written in Yiddish and first published in 1894; they have been published as Tevye and His Daughters, Tevye's Daughters, Tevye the Milkman, and Tevye the Dairyman.

As Tevye "tells" Aleichem the tales of his family life, six of his seven daughters (Tzeitel, Chava, Hodel, Shprintze, Taybele, and Bielke) are named, and of these five play leading roles in Tevye's stories. The stories tell of his business dealings, the romantic dealings and marriages of several of his daughters, and the expulsion of the Jews from their village by the Russian government.

The Tevye stories have been adapted for stage and film several times. Sholem Aleichem's own Yiddish stage adaptation was not produced during his lifetime; its first production, by Maurice Schwartz, was in 1919. (Schwartz did a film based on the play twenty years later.) The Broadway musical Fiddler on the Roof was based on a play written by Arnold Perl called Tevye and His Daughters. Tevye the Dairyman has had four film adaptations: in Yiddish (1939), Hebrew (1968), English (1971) and Russian (2017).

== Name ==
The name Tevye is the Yiddish derivative of the Hebrew name טוביה, Tuvya (i.e., Tobias).. In Hebrew, the character is known as טוביה החולב, Tuvya ha-cholev, [ˈtuvja (h)aχoˈlev], 'Tobias the dairyman'.. Tevye's full name, with its Yiddish patronymic, is Tevye ben Shneur Zalman.

== Stories ==
Tevye the Dairyman comprises eight stories, with Tevye each time supposedly meeting Sholom Aleichem by chance and relating the latest tale of his trials and tribulations. They have been published in translation under the following titles:

1. Tevye Strikes It Rich (also translated as Tevye Wins a Fortune or The Great Windfall)
2. Tevye Blows A Small Fortune (also translated as The Roof Falls In or The Bubble Bursts)
3. Today's Children (also translated as Modern Children)
4. Hodel
5. Chava
6. Shprintze
7. Tevye Leaves for the Land of Israel (also translated as Tevye Goes to Palestine or Tevye is Going to Eretz Yisroel)
8. Lekh-Lekho (also translated as Get Thee Out)

Not all the events of the stories are depicted in Fiddler on the Roof, the best-known adaptation. For instance, by the time of the events of Lekh-Lekho, Tevye's wife Golde, his daughter Shprintze, and his son-in-law Motl have all died; also in Lekh-Lekho, upon learning of the Jews' expulsion, Chava leaves her Russian Orthodox husband, wanting to return to her family and share their exile. Aleichem leaves it to the reader to decide whether or not Tevye forgives her and takes her back, saying:

Put yourself in Tevye's place and tell me honestly, in plain language, what you would have done… (Hillel Halkin translation).

and ending the story with "The old God of Israel still lives!"

A 2009 translation includes a final short story titled Vachalaklokos that takes place after Lekh-Lekho.

Other translations include:

- Aleichem, Sholem (1994), Sholem Aleykhem's Tevye the Dairyman, Miriam Katz transl (complete, illustrated ed.), Pangloss, ISBN 0-9347-1031-7.
- ——— (1999) [Crown Publishers, 1949], Tevye's Daughters: Collected Stories of Sholom Aleichem, Frances Butwin transl, Sholom Aleichem Family, ISBN 1-9290-6803-4; for many years, this translation seems to have been the standard published version.

The story "Tevye Strikes It Rich" was adapted for children by Gabriel Lisowski in 1976 and published under the title How Tevye Became a Milkman.

=== Audio adaptations ===
The Tevye stories have been recorded and commercially released twice:

- Aleichem, Sholem (1987), The Stories of Tevye the Dairyman, Audio Renaissance, Theodore Bikel narrator (unabridged ed.), Macmillan Audio, ISBN 978-1-55927379-4, with six of the stories: Tevye Strikes It Rich, Tevye Blows a Small Fortune, Today's Children, Hodl, Chava and Lekh-Lekho.
- ——— (2009), Tevye the Milkman, Classic Fiction, Neville Jason narrator (unabridged ed.), Naxos Audiobooks, ISBN 978-962634934-2.

An audio production of Arnold Perl's play Tevya and His Daughters was released by Columbia Masterworks in 1957 (OL 5225); the cast included Mike Kellin as Tevya, Anna Vita Berger as Golde/The Rich Woman, Joan Harvey as Tzeitl, Carroll Conroy as Hodl, and Howard Da Silva (who also directed the production) as Lazar Wolf/The Rich Merchant/The Rabbi.

The NPR/Yiddish Book Center 13-part mid-1990s radio series Great Jewish Stories from Eastern Europe and Beyond, hosted by Leonard Nimoy, broadcast a reading of the story "Chava" performed by Walter Matthau.

== Portrayals ==
Zero Mostel and Chaim Topol are the two actors most associated with the role of Tevye, although Theodore Bikel performed it many times on stage. For the film version of Fiddler on the Roof, the part ultimately went to Topol, as producer-director Norman Jewison felt that Mostel's portrayal was too unnecessarily comic. Topol was nominated for an Academy Award for his performance in the film version of Fiddler. He also portrayed the character nearly 3,500 times on stage, retiring the role in 2009.

Other noteworthy musical Tevyes have included Luther Adler, Herschel Bernardi, Paul Lipson (original Broadway run, over 2,000 performances), Leonard Nimoy (1971 touring company), Shmuel Rodensky (original Israeli, Yiddish and German productions), Alfred Molina and Harvey Fierstein (2004 Broadway revival), Henry Goodman (2007 London revival), Danny Burstein (2015 Broadway revival), Yehezkel Lazarov (2018 touring company), Humberto de Vargas (2017–2018 Uruguay production), and Steven Skybell (2018 Off-Broadway revival in Yiddish). Paul Michael Glaser, who played Perchik in the 1971 film version, played Tevye in a 2013–14 touring production in the United Kingdom.

Tevya is the name of a 1939 film adaptation of the story, performed entirely in Yiddish. In this adaptation, Tevye, played by Maurice Schwartz, is portrayed as gruff with flashes of wit and humor.

Prior to the 1964 Broadway debut of Fiddler on the Roof, adaptations of the Tevye stories appeared on stage and screen, in America and beyond. The earliest screen version was an American silent film called Broken Barriers, based on Aleichem's own theatrical treatment and released in 1919 (just a few years after Aleichem died). In 1962, Gerhard Klingenberg directed the television film Tevya und seine Töchter. After Fiddler on the Roof became a Broadway sensation, an Israeli film called Tuvia Vesheva Benotav (Tevye and His Seven Daughters) starring Shmuel Rodensky was released in 1968, as well as two Russian versions: Teve-molochnik (Tevye the Milkman) in 1985 and Myr vashomu domu! (Tevye's Daughters) in 2017.

In 2018, Jerusalem Ballet published a ballet adaptation based on both Tevye the Dairyman and Fiddler on the Roof, by Russian ballet dancer-choreographer Igor Menshikov. Tevye has been portrayed by Israeli ballet dancer Meitar Basson.

== Films ==
- Broken Barriers (1919) with Maurice Schwartz as Tevye
- Tevya (1939) with Maurice Schwartz as Tevye
- Tevye and His Seven Daughters (Tuvia Vesheva Benotav) (1968, Israel/West Germany) with Shmuel Rodensky as Tevye
- Fiddler on the Roof (1971) with Chaim Topol as Tevye
- Tevye's Daughters (Myr vashomu domu! In Ukrainian: Мир Вашому дому!) (2017, Ukraine) with Evgeniy Knyazev as Tevye

== Television ==
- Tevye and His Seven Daughters (Tuvia Vesheva Benotav) (1962, West Germany) with Alfred Balthoff as Tevye
- Alta comedia: Tevié, el lechero (1965, Argentina)
- Teve-molochnik (1985, Soviet Union) with Mikhail Ulyanov as Tevye

== Bibliography ==
- Liptzin, Sol (1972), A History of Yiddish Literature, Middle Village, NY: Jonathan David, pp. 68–70, ISBN 0-8246-0124-6.
- Huttner, Jan Lisa (2014), Tevye's Daughters: No Laughing Matter, New York, NY: FF2 Media, ASIN B00NQDQCTG.
