= 1968 in Israel =

- Decades: 1940s; 1950s; 1960s; 1970s; 1980s
- See also: History of Israel; Timeline of Israeli history; List of years in Israel

Events in the year 1968 in Israel.

== Incumbents ==
- President of Israel – Zalman Shazar
- Prime Minister of Israel – Levi Eshkol (Alignment)
- President of the Supreme Court – Shimon Agranat (1965–1976)
- Chief of General Staff – Haim Bar-Lev
- Government of Israel – 13th Government of Israel

== Events ==
- 1 January – Haim Bar-Lev is appointed as the eighth Chief of Staff of the Israel Defense Forces.
- 25 January – The Israeli submarine INS Dakar sinks in the Mediterranean Sea, killing 69.
- 2 May – The Israel Broadcasting Authority commences television broadcasts.
- 13 August – Israel's Knesset passes the Basic Law: The Government.
- 28 December – 1968 Israeli raid on Lebanon: Commandos from the IDF's elite Sayeret Matkal destroy 13 civilian airplanes in the Beirut International Airport belonging to Middle East Airlines (MEA) in response to the attack on the Israeli airliner in Athens. There are no casualties reported.

=== Israeli–Palestinian conflict ===
The most prominent events related to the Israeli–Palestinian conflict which occurred during 1968 include:

- 20 December - Lieutenant-Colonel Zvi Ofer (Tzvika Ofer), commander of the elite Haruv unit, former Military Governor of Nablus and recipient of the Israeli medal of valour, is killed in action in Wadi Qelt, west of Jericho, while in pursuit of militants who had crossed the Jordan.

Notable Israeli military operations against Palestinian militancy targets

The most prominent Israeli military counter-terrorism operations (military campaigns and military operations) carried out against Palestinian militants during 1968 include:

- 21 March – The Battle of Karameh takes place in the town of Karameh, Jordan between IDF forces and combined forces of the Palestine Liberation Organization (PLO) and the Jordanian Army.

Notable Palestinian militant operations against Israeli targets

The most prominent Palestinian terror attacks committed against Israelis during 1968 include:

- 23 July – El Al Flight 426 hijacking: The only successful hijacking of an El Al aircraft takes place, when a Boeing 707 carrying ten crew members and 38 passengers is taken over by three terrorists of the Popular Front for the Liberation of Palestine (PFLP). The aircraft, El Al Flight 426, which was en route from Rome to Tel Aviv, is diverted to Algiers by the hijackers. Negotiations with the hijackers lasted for 40 days. Both the hijackers and the passengers, including 21 Israeli hostages, were eventually freed.
- 4 September 1968, Terrorists bomb Tel Aviv central bus station killing 1 and injuring 51.
- 26 December – El Al Flight 253 attack: Two PFLP militants attack an attacked an El Al plane about to depart at the Athens International Airport, firing a submachine gun and throwing grenades at the plane as it sat on the runway warming up prior to take off. An Israeli mechanic was killed in the attack and two others were injured.

=== Unknown dates ===
- The founding of the moshav Givat Yoav.

== Notable births ==
- 8 November – Zehava Ben, Israeli singer.
- 14 December – Yotam Ottolenghi, chef
- 28 December – Lior Ashkenazi, Israeli screen and stage actor.

== Notable deaths ==
- 11 January – Moshe Zvi Segal (born 1876), Russian (Lithuania)-born Israeli linguist and Talmudic scholar.
- 1 February – Jacob van der Hoeden (born 1891), Dutch-born Israeli veterinary scientist.
- 26 September – Lipman Heilprin (born 1902), Russian (Poland)-born Israeli physician.
- 20 December – Zvi Ofer (born 1932) Israeli soldier, former military governor of Nablus.

== See also ==
- 1968 in Israeli film
- 1968 in Israeli television
- 1968 in Israeli music
- 1968 in Israeli sport
- Israel at the 1968 Summer Olympics
