= Esther Gamlielit =

Israeli singer

Esther Gamlielit אסתר גמליאלית
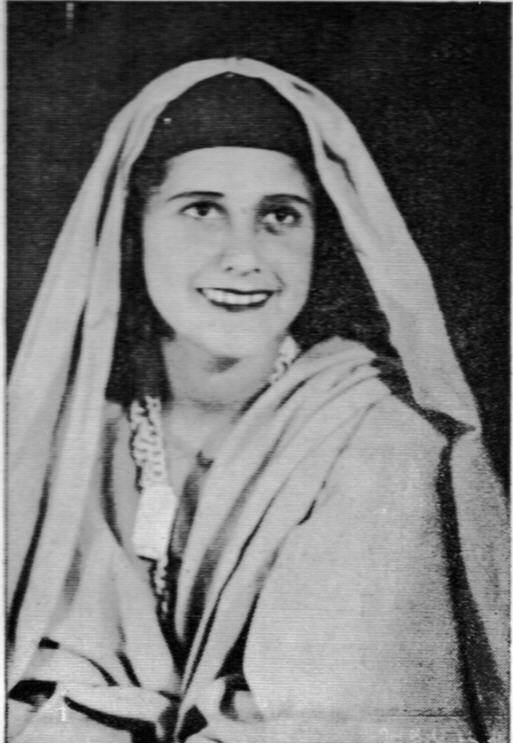

Background information
- Born: 13 March 1919; Egypt
- Died: 17 September 2012 (aged 93) Ramat Yishai, Israel
- Years active: 1930s, 1940s

Esther Gamlielit (Hebrew: אסתר גמליאלית; 13 March 1919 – 17 September 2012) was an Israeli singer and actress who was popular in the 1930s and 1940s.

== Biography ==
Gamlielit was born on 13 March 1919 in Egypt to Yemenite-Jewish parents who were en route to Palestine. After arriving, they settled in the Neve Tzedek quarter of Tel Aviv and later moved to the Yemenite Quarter.

At 16, she joined the Biblical Ballet, a dance studio mostly consisting of Yemenite Jewish women which blended Yemenite dance steps with biblical themes. She gained notoriety as a singer through Biblical Ballet, eventually appearing on the British Mandate established radio station Kol Yerushalayim. Gamlielit later joined Ha-Matate, a satirical theater. While with Matate, she was part of a trio with Shmuel Rodensky and Jacob Timen.

After a performance in Nes Ziyyonah she met Avigdor Yosippon, who was on guard duty. They fell in love and got married one week later. Her marriage led to her retiring at 22, although she would make occasional one-time appearances. In 1960, she was invited by Dahn Ben-Amotz to perform in a nostalgia show on artists of the Yishuv. In 1994, she was widowed from Avigdor.

In 2000, she produced a non-commercial album, with seventeen original recordings of her songs. She died on 17 September 2012 and was buried in Kiryat Tiv'on.
