= 1966 in Israel =

- Decades: 1940s; 1950s; 1960s; 1970s; 1980s
- See also: History of Israel; Timeline of Israeli history; List of years in Israel

Events in the year 1966 in Israel.

== Incumbents ==
- Prime Minister of Israel – Levi Eshkol (Alignment)
- President of Israel – Zalman Shazar
- President of the Supreme Court – Shimon Agranat
- Chief of General Staff – Yitzhak Rabin
- Government of Israel – 12th Government of Israel until 12 January, 13th Government of Israel

== Events ==
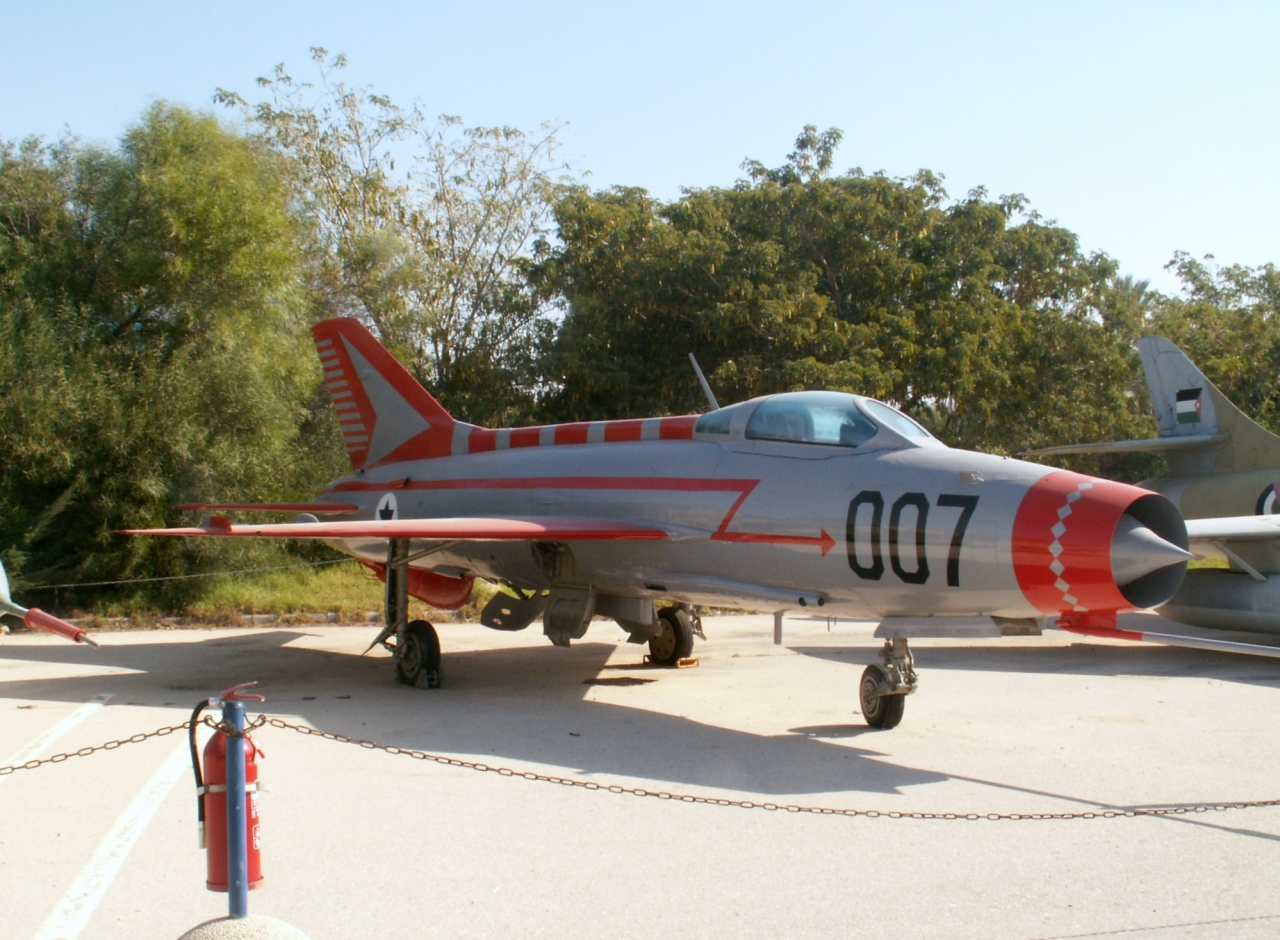
Former Iraqi MiG-21, the subject of Operation Diamond, at the Israeli Air Force Museum in Hatzerim

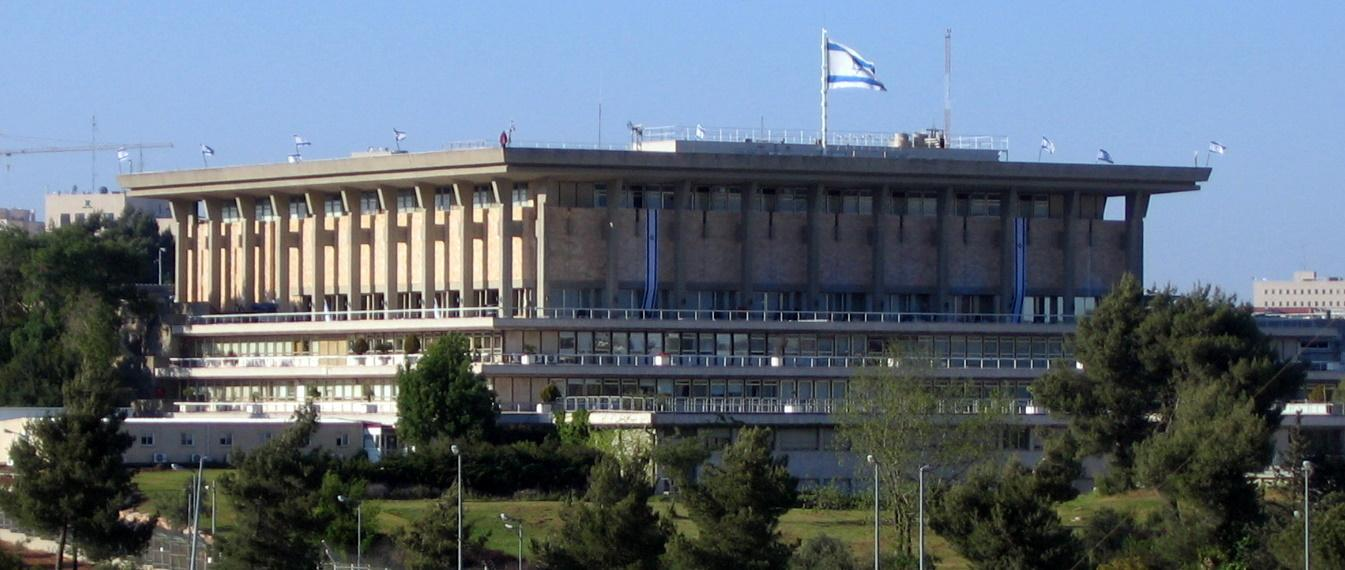
The Knesset building is inaugurated on 30 August.

- 12 January – Levi Eshkol presents his cabinet for a Knesset "Vote of Confidence". The 13th Government is approved that day and the members are sworn in.
- 28 February – Israeli peace activist Abie Nathan flies his private plane to Egypt and lands in the Egyptian city of Port Said. Arrested upon landing, Nathan asks to meet Egyptian president Gamal Abdel Nasser and to deliver a petition calling for peace between Israel and Egypt. His request is denied and he is deported back to Israel.
- 24 March – The beginning of the Israeli Educational Television broadcasts.
- 16 May – Two Israelis were killed when their jeep hit a landmine, north of the Sea of Galilee and south of Almagor. Tracks led into Syria.
- 14 July – Israeli and Syrian jet fighters clash over the Jordan River.
- 15 August – Israeli and Syrian troops clash over the Sea of Galilee for three hours.
- 16 August – The Iraqi fighter pilot Munir Redfa defects to Israel by flying a MiG-21 of the Iraqi Air Force to Israel. The MiG-21 fighter is evaluated by the Israeli Air Force. Knowledge obtained from analysis of the aircraft was instrumental to the successes achieved by the Israeli Air Force in its future encounters with Arab MiG-21s.
- 30 August – The Knesset building is inaugurated.
- October – Shmuel Yosef Agnon receives the Nobel Prize in Literature, becoming the first Israeli Nobel laureate.
- 4 October – Israel applies for the affiliate membership of the EEC.
- 8 November – The martial law imposed on the Israeli Arabs since the founding of the State of Israel is lifted completely and Arab citizens are granted the same rights as Jewish citizens under law.

=== Israeli–Palestinian conflict ===
The most prominent events related to the Israeli–Palestinian conflict which occurred during 1966 include:

Notable Palestinian militant operations against Israeli targets

The most prominent Palestinian terror attacks committed against Israelis during 1966 include:

- 25 April – Explosions placed by terrorists wounded two civilians and damaged three houses in moshav Beit Yosef, in the Beit She'an Valley.
- 14 July – Armed Palestinian militants attacked a house in Kfar Yuval.
- 19 July – Armed Palestinian militants infiltrated into Moshav Margaliot on the northern border and planted nine explosive charges.
- 27 October – A civilian was wounded by an explosive charge on the railroad tracks to Jerusalem.
- 11 November – An Israeli border patrol vehicle carrying policemen drives over a land mine near the Israeli-Jordanian Armistice line, killing three policemen and wounding six; the mine is reportedly planted by the PLO subgroup, Fatah.

Notable Israeli military operations against Palestinian militancy targets

The most prominent Israeli military counter-terrorism operations (military campaigns and military operations) carried out against Palestinian militants during 1966 include:

- 13 November – Samu Incident: Following a series of sabotage acts committed against Israeli targets, in particular the deaths of the three Israeli policemen killed by a land mine two days earlier, IDF forces cross into Jordan and raid the West Bank village of as-Samu, south of the city of Hebron. During the operation 18 Jordanians soldiers and one Israeli soldier are killed.

== Notable births ==
- 22 February – Yahya Ayyash, Palestinian brigade leader and bombmaker (d. 1996)
- 7 April – Zvika Hadar, Israeli actor, comedian and television host.
- 7 May – Dafna Dekel, Israeli singer and actress.
- 19 August – Saleh al-Arouri, Palestinian military leader (d. 2024)
- 25 November – Orna Banai, Israeli actress
- 9 December – Gideon Sa'ar, Israeli politician

== Notable deaths ==
- 25 January – Saul Adler (born 1895), Russian (Belarus)-born Israeli physician, microbiologist and parasitology expert.
- 10 October – Eliyahu Meridor (born 1914), Russian-born Israeli politician.
- 4 November – Ya'akov Klivnov (born 1887), Russian (Belarus)-born Israeli politician.
- 8 November – Bernhard Zondek (born 1891), German-born Israeli gynecologist, developer of first reliable pregnancy test.

== See also ==
- 1966 in Israeli film
- 1966 in Israeli music
- 1966 in Israeli sport
