= List of Israeli films of 1972 =

A list of films produced by the Israeli film industry in 1972.

== 1972 releases ==
Premiere	Title	Director	Cast	Genre	Notes	Ref
October 31	Escape to the Sun	Menahem Golan	Laurence Harvey, Josephine Chaplin and John Ireland	Drama	An Israeli-German-French co-production	

=== Unknown premiere date ===
Premiere	Title	Director	Cast	Genre	Notes	Ref
?	Ani Ohev Otach Rosa (Hebrew: אני אוהב אותך רוזה, lit. "I Love You Rosa")	Moshé Mizrahi		Drama	Entered into the 1972 Cannes Film Festival	
?	Azit Hakalba Hatzanhanit (Hebrew: עזית הכלבה הצנחנית, lit. "Azit, the Paratrooper Dog")	Boaz Davidson		Action, War		
?	Metzitzim (Hebrew: מציצים, lit. "Peeping Toms")	Uri Zohar		Comedy	Entered into the 23rd Berlin International Film Festival	
?	Ha-Glula (Hebrew: הגלולה, lit. "The Pill")	David Perlov		Drama, Fantasy		
?	But Where Is Daniel Wax?	Avraham Heffner		Drama		
?	Floch	Dan Wolman		Drama		
?	Shod Hatelephonim Hagadol (Hebrew: שוד הטלפונים הגדול, lit. "The Great Telephone Robbery")	Menahem Golan		Drama		
?	The Hitch Hiker (Hebrew: הטרמפיסט)	Amos Sefer		Action, Comedy, Sci-Fi		
February 12	Salomonico (Hebrew: סלומוניקו)	Alfred Steinhardt	Reuven Bar-Yotam, Gabi Amrani, Mosko Alkalai	Comedy		
?	Shtei Defikot Lev (Hebrew: שתי דפיקות לב, lit. "Two Heartbeats")	Shmuel Imberman	Yehuda Barkan	Drama		
?	Nurit (Hebrew: נורית)	George Obadiah		Drama, Musical		
?	Nahtche V'Hageneral (Hebrew: נחצ'ה והגנרל)	George Obadiah		Comedy		
?	The Jerusalem File	John Flynn		Drama	An Israeli-American co-production	
?	Robinson and His Tempestuous Slaves (Hebrew: רובינסון ושפחותיו המפתות)	Jesus Franco	Yehuda Barkan	Comedy	An Israeli-German-French co-production	
?	Neither by Day Nor by Night	Steven Hilliard Stern		Drama	An Israeli-American co-production; Entered into the 22nd Berlin International Film Festival	

== See also ==
- 1972 in Israel
