= List of Israeli films of 1967 =

A list of films produced by the Israeli film industry in 1967.

== 1967 releases ==
| Premiere | Title | Director | Cast | Genre | Notes | Ref |
|---|---|---|---|---|---|---|
| ? | 999 Aliza Mizrahi (Hebrew: 999 עליזה מזרחי) | Menahem Golan | Edna Fliedel | Drama, Comedy | | |
| ? | Three Days and a Child (Hebrew: שלושה ימים וילד) | Uri Zohar | Oded Kotler | Drama | Kotler won the award for Best Actor at the 1967 Cannes Film Festival | |
| ? | Ervinka (Hebrew: ארבינקא) | Ephraim Kishon | Haim Topol | Comedy | | |
| ? | Hu Halach B'Sadot (Hebrew: הוא הלך בשדות, lit. "He Walked Through the Fields") | Yosef Millo | Assi Dayan, Iris Yotvat | Drama | | |
| ? | Sayarim (Hebrew: סיירים, lit. "Scouting Patrol") | Micha Shagrir | Assi Dayan, Ze'ev Revach | Drama, Action | | |
| ? | Shishim Sha'ot L'Suetz (Hebrew: 60 שעות לסואץ, lit. "Sixty Hours to Suez") | Kobi Jaeger | | Drama | | |
| ? | Isha B'Heder Hashanei (Hebrew: אישה בחדר השני, lit. "Women in the Other Room") | Yitzhak Yeshurun | | Drama | | |
| ? | Haminiyah Leretzach (Hebrew: המניע לרצח, lit. "Motive to Kill") | Peter Freistadt | Gila Almagor | Drama | | |

== See also ==
- 1967 in Israel
