= Tevye and His Seven Daughters =

1968 film directed by Menahem Golan

- Film poster
- Directed by: Menahem Golan
- Screenplay by: Sholem Aleichem; Menahem Golan; Haim Hefer
- Based on: Tevye and His Daughters by Sholem Aleichem
- Produced by: Artur Brauner; Menahem Golan
- Starring: Shmuel Rodensky
- Cinematography: Nissim Leon
- Edited by: Tova Biran
- Release date: 5 May 1968
- Running time: 119 minutes
- Country: Israel
- Language: Hebrew

Tevye and His Seven Daughters (Hebrew: טוביה ושבע בנותיו, romanized: Tuvia Vesheva Benotav) is a 1968 Israeli drama film directed by Menahem Golan. Based on stories by Sholem Aleichem, which were also the basis for the stage musical and 1971 film, both titled Fiddler on the Roof.

The film, which is in Hebrew and has a runtime of 119 minutes, was produced by Menahem Golan and Artur Brauner. It achieved significant box office success, selling 615,700 tickets in Israeli cinemas. Tuvia and His Seven Daughters was slated to compete at the Cannes Film Festival, but the festival was canceled due to the events of May 1968.

== Plot ==
Tevye is a poor, hardworking Jewish man living in a village near the town of Anatevka—a typical Jewish shtetl in the Pale of Settlement in the Russian Empire at the end of the 19th century. Tevye works as a milkman, selling milk, butter, and cheese to the town's residents. He barely makes a living to support his wife Golde (Betty Segal) and their seven daughters.

Tevye struggles to bridge the generational gap and cope with his daughters' aspirations. His older daughters challenge him with difficult decisions: whether to marry them off through traditional matches with wealthy men or Torah scholars, or to allow them to wed the men they love.

Tevye often spices his stories with quotes from the Torah, Talmud, Mishnah, Aggadah, and Jewish legends, humorously twisting their meanings to fit the messages he wishes to convey. Despite facing numerous hardships—financial, familial, and existential—Tevye remains full of humor and optimism, sustained by his faith in God.

== Cast ==
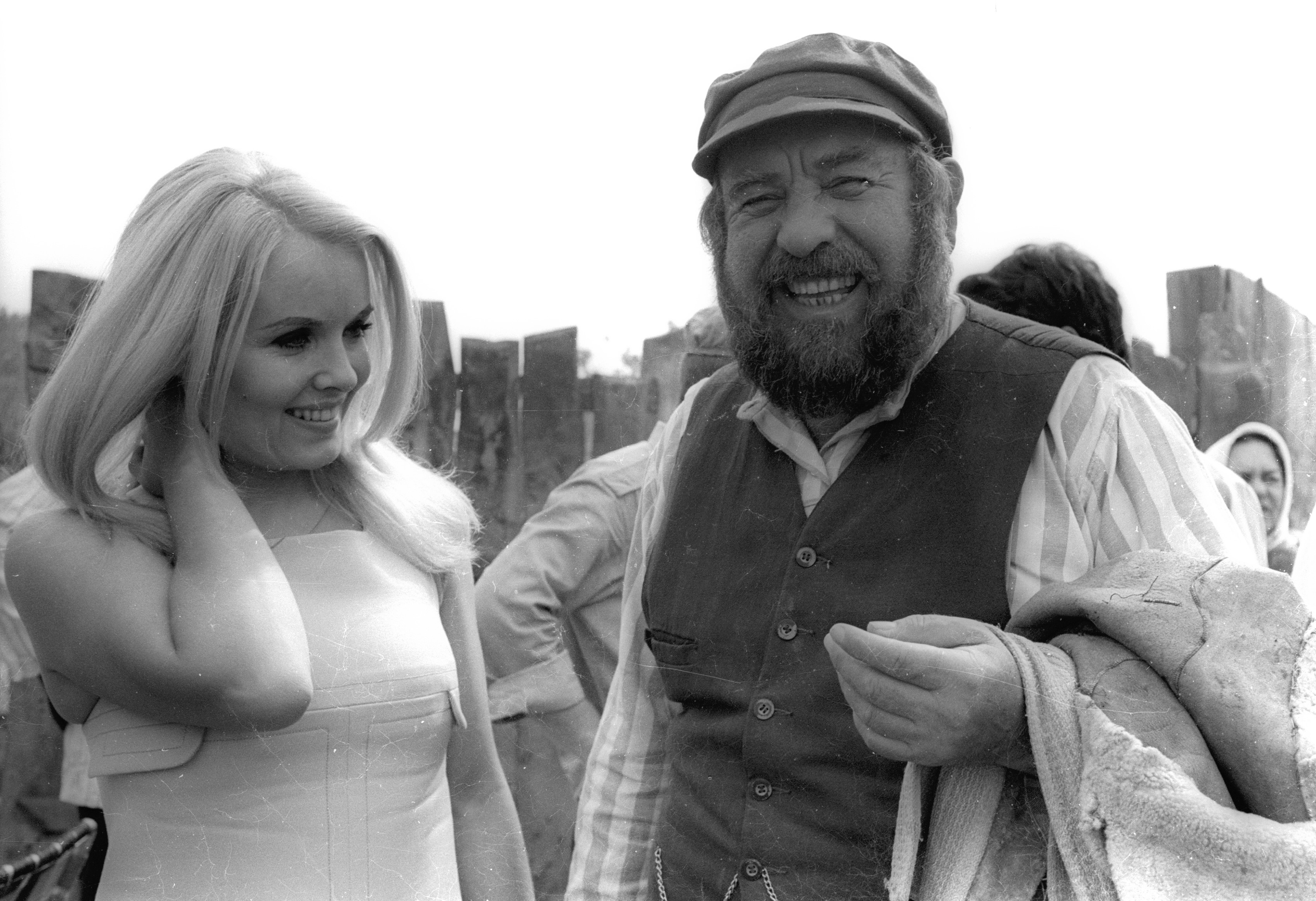
Shmuel Rodensky (right) on the set of Tevye and His Seven Daughters

- Shmuel Rodensky as Tevye
- Betty Segal as Golda, his wife
- Ninet Dinar as Zeitl
- Avital Paz as Hodl
- Judith Solé as Sprinza
- Tikva Mor as Chava
- Mira-Gan-Mor as Bailke
- Robert Hoffmann as Fyodor
- Peter van Eyck as Priest
- Wolfgang Kieling as Poperilli
- Illy Gorlitsky as Menahem-Mendl

== Release ==
The film was listed to compete at the 1968 Cannes Film Festival, but the festival was cancelled due to the events of May 1968 in France.
