= Paltiel Daykan =

Israeli jurist (1885–1969)

- פלטיאל דייקן
- Born: 12 May 1885; Lithuania, Russian Empire
- Died: 12 February 1969 (aged 83); Israel
- Occupation: Jurist
- Awards: Israel Prize (1957)

Paltiel Daykan (Hebrew: פלטיאל דייקן; May 12, 1885 – February 12, 1969) was an Israeli jurist.

== Early life ==
Daykan was born in Lithuania, then part of the Russian Empire, in 1885. He emigrated to Mandate Palestine (now Israel) in 1921.

== Awards ==
- In 1957, Daykan was awarded the Israel Prize, for jurisprudence.

== See also ==
- List of Israel Prize recipients
