= List of Israeli films of 1966 =

A list of films produced by the Israeli film industry in 1966.

== 1966 releases ==
Premiere	Title	Director	Cast	Genre	Notes	Ref
?	Moishe Ventalator (Hebrew: מוישה ונטילטור, lit. "Moishe Air-Condition")	Uri Zohar	Ya'ackov Bodo	Comedy		
?	Shnei Kuni Leml (Hebrew: שני קוני למל, lit. "Two Kuni Lemls")	Israel Becker	Mike Burstyn	Drama, Musical, Comedy		
?	Fortuna (Hebrew: פורטונה)	Menahem Golan		Drama		
?	Trunk to Cairo (Hebrew: מבצע קהיר)	Menahem Golan, Raphael Nussbaum	Audie Murphy, George Sanders, Marianne Koch	Drama	An Israeli-West German co-production	
?	My Name is Ahmed (Hebrew: אני אחמד)	Avshalom Katz	Ahmed Yousef	Documentary, Drama		
?	Sabina (Hebrew: סבינה והגברים, lit. "Sabina and the Men")	Peter Freistadt	Eva Bartok, Ze'ev Revach, Aharon Meskin, Uri Zohar, Shaike Ophir, Gideon Singer, Zaharira Harifai	Comedy, Drama		
?	Motive to Murder (Hebrew: המניע לרצח)	Peter Freistadt	Gila Almagor, Gideon Singer, Aharon Meskin, Avner Hizkiyahu, Ori Levi, Uri Zohar, Oded Teomi	Drama		

== See also ==
- 1966 in Israel
