= Ze'ev Shefer =

Israeli politician (1891 –1964)

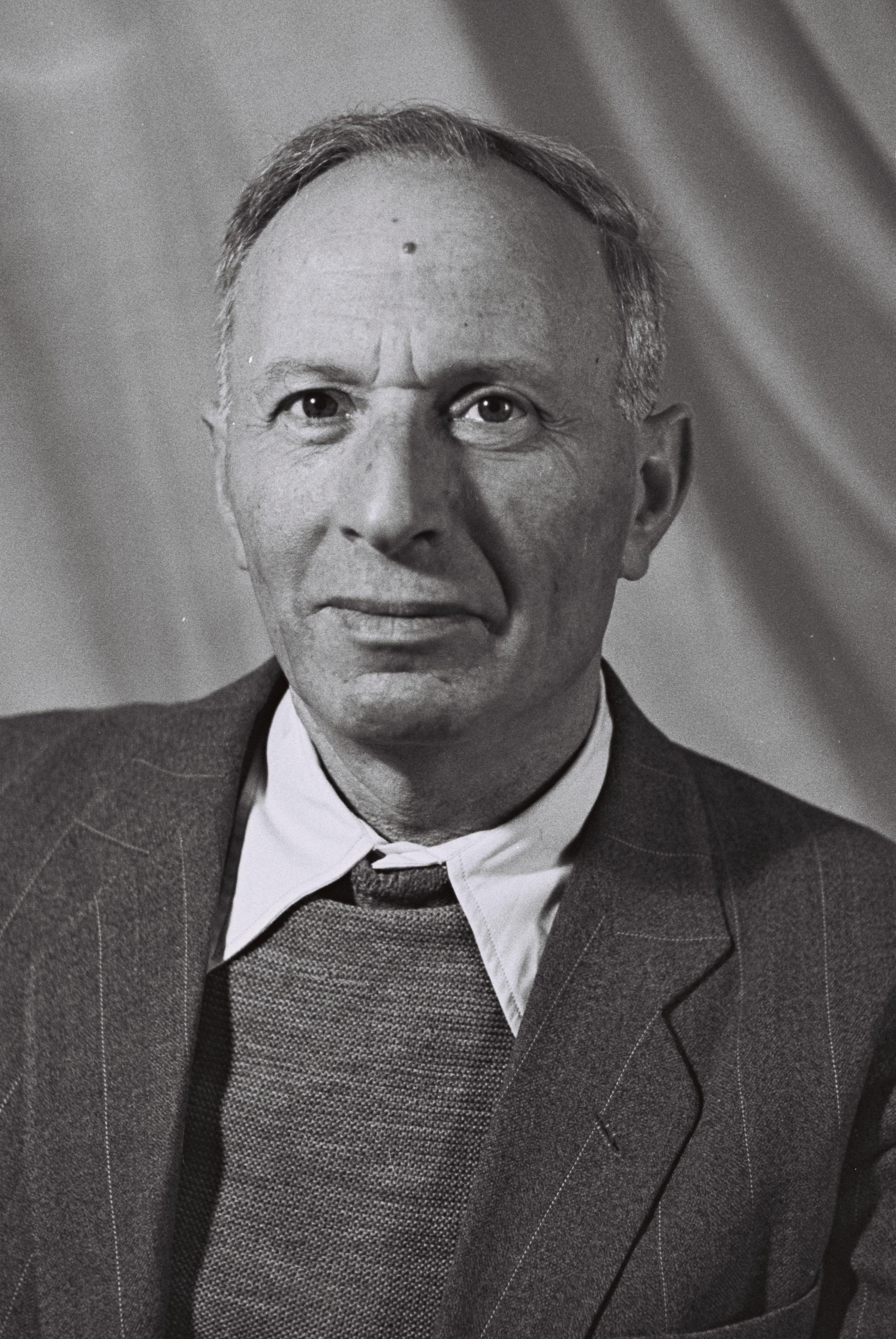

Faction represented in the Knesset
- 1951–1955: Mapai

Personal details
- Born: 21 April 1891 Uman, Russian Empire
- Died: 10 April 1964 (aged 72) Israel

Ze'ev Shefer (Hebrew: זאב שפר; 21 April 1891 – 10 April 1964) was an Israeli politician who served as a member of the Knesset for Mapai between 1951 and 1955.

== Biography ==
Born Ze'ev Feinstein in Uman in the Russian Empire (today in Ukraine), Shefer attended a Russian School in Chișinău before emigrating to Ottoman-controlled Palestine in 1913. He joined the Tzeiri Zion youth group, and later became a member of Hapoel Hatzair. After David Ben-Gurion and Yitzhak Ben-Zvi were expelled by the Ottoman authorities, he was a member of the Poale HaIvri central committee. In 1917 he volunteered to join the Jewish Legion. After being demobilised he lived in the Lower Galilee.

In 1919 he was amongst the founders of Ahdut HaAvoda, and the following year helped establish kibbutz Ayelet HaShahar. He worked as a member of the mounted platoon of the special police that guarded the villages in the area. In 1921 he was also amongst the founders of the Histadrut.

Shefer moved to Tel Aviv, where he became secretary of the Tel Aviv Workers Council and a member of the city council in 1929. In 1939 he became secretary of Mapai. Between 1939 and 1945 he served in the British Army during World War II. Upon his return to Palestine after the war, he became a member of the Haganah's national command and also served as acting head of national staff.

In 1949 he became a member of the HaKibbutz HaMeuhad secretariat. Two years later he was elected to the Knesset on the Mapai list and was appointed Deputy Speaker. When HaKibbutz HaMeuhad split in 1952, he was amongst the founders of the Mapai-aligned Ihud HaKvutzot VeHaKibbutzim. Shefer lost his seat in the 1955 elections and died in 1964 at the age of 72.
