= List of Israeli films of 2007 =

A list of films produced by the Israeli film industry in 2007.

== 2007 releases ==
Premiere		Title	Director	Cast	Genre	Notes	Ref
F E B	14	Beaufort (Hebrew: בופור)	Joseph Cedar	Oshri Cohen, Ohad Knoller, Alon Aboutboul	action, drama, war	Nominated for the Academy Award for Best Foreign Language Film	
M A R	22	A Dangerous Dance (Hebrew: ריקוד מסוכן)	Menahem Golan		Musical		
M A R	30	The Shelter (Hebrew: המקלט)	Roy Hornshtein	Yehezkel Lazarov, Gila Almagor	Drama, Thriller		
A P R	29	Hofshat Kaits (Hebrew: חופשת קיץ, lit. "Summer vacation")	David Wallach		Drama	Israeli-French-American co-production	
M A Y	19	The Band's Visit (Hebrew: ביקור התזמורת, lit. "The Band's Visit")	Eran Kolirin	Sasson Gabai, Ronit Elkabetz, Saleh Bakri, Khalifa Natour	Comedy, Drama, Music	Israeli-French-American co-production	
M A Y	20	Tehilim (Hebrew: תהילים)	Raphael Nadjari	Michael Moshonov, Limor Goldstein, Ilan Dar	Drama	Entered into the 2007 Cannes Film Festival	
M A Y	22	Meduzot (Hebrew: מדוזות, lit. "Jellyfish")	Shira Geffen and Etgar Keret		Drama	Israeli-French co-production	
J U N	14	The Secrets (Hebrew: הסודות)	Avi Nesher	Ania Bukstein, Adir Miller, Guri Alfi, Alma Zack, Dana Ivgy, Sefi Rivlin, Rivka Michaeli	Drama		
J U L	26	Noodle (Hebrew: נודל)	Ayelet Menahemi	Mili Avital, Alon Aboutboul	Drama		
A U G	8	Japan Japan (Hebrew: יפאן יפאן)	Lior Shamriz	Imri Kahn	Drama	Israeli-German-American co-production	
S E P	6	Disengagement (Hebrew: התנתקות)	Amos Gitai	Juliette Binoche, Dana Ivgy, Liron Levo	Drama		
O C T	18	Rak Klavim Ratzim Hofshi (Hebrew: רק כלבים רצים חופשי, lit. "Only Dogs Run Free")	Arnon Zadok	Lior Ashkenazi, Ayelet Zurer	Drama		
N O V	29	The Debt (Hebrew: החוב)	Assaf Bernstein	Gila Almagor, Neta Garty, Yehezkel Lazarov	Thriller		

== Awards ==
=== Ophir Award ===	=== Wolgin Award ===

== Notable deaths ==
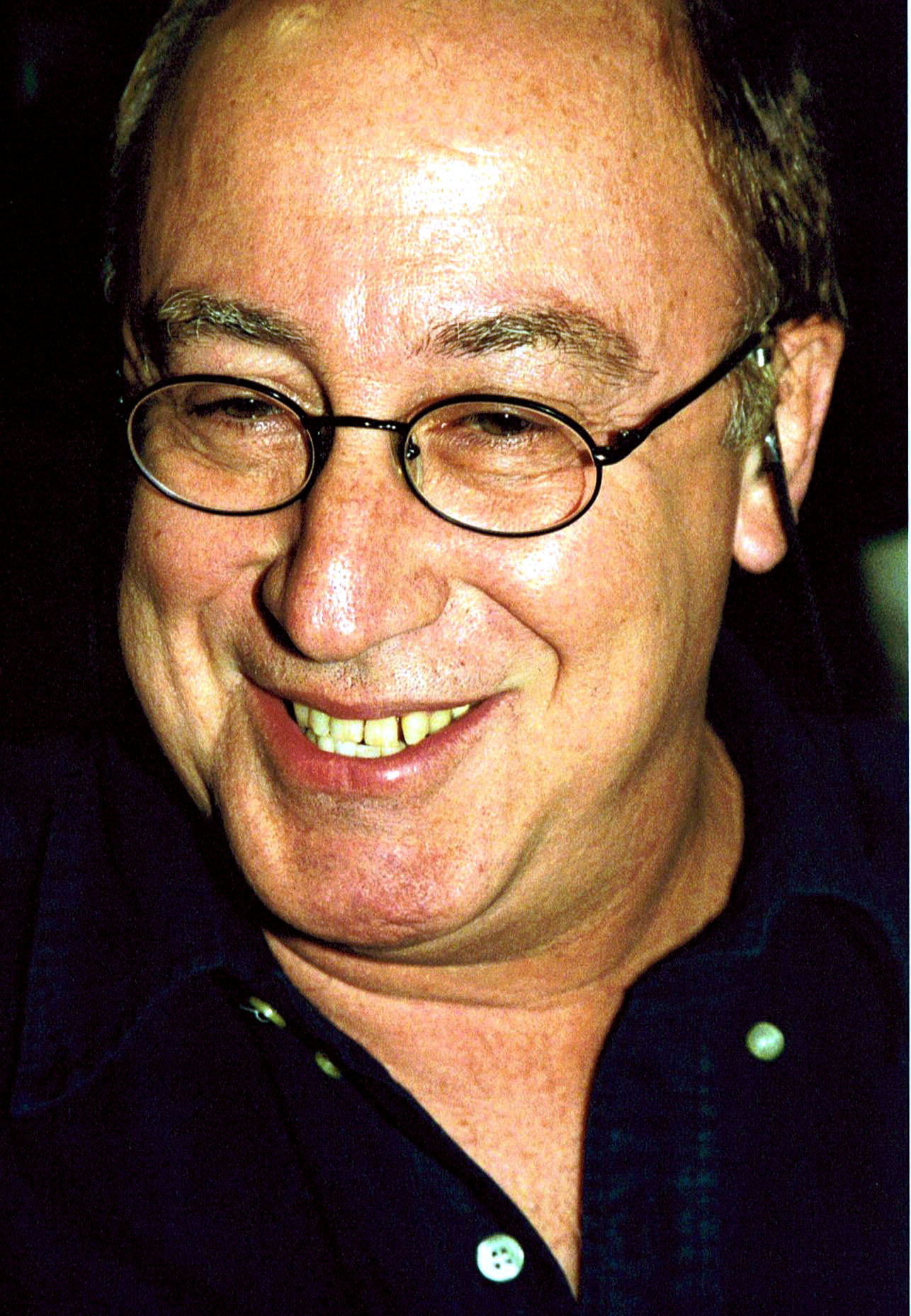
Yisrael Poliakov

- 8 July – Itzik Kol, Israeli film producer - pneumonia. (born 1932)
- 30 October – Yisrael Poliakov, Israeli actor, member of comedy group HaGashash HaHiver - cancer. (born 1941)

== See also ==
- 2007 in Israel
