= List of Israeli films of 1964 =

A list of films produced by the Israeli film industry in 1964.

== 1964 releases ==
Premiere	Title	Director	Cast	Genre	Notes	Ref
?	Sallah Shabati (Hebrew: סאלח שבתי)	Ephraim Kishon	Chaim Topol	Comedy, Satire		
?	Hor B'Levana (Hebrew: חור בלבנה, lit. "Hole in the Moon")	Uri Zohar	Arik Lavie, Shaike Ophir			
?	Dalia Vehamalahim (Hebrew: דליה והמלחים, lit. "Dalia and the Sailors")	Menahem Golan				
?	Shemona B'Ekevot Ahat (Hebrew: שמונה בעקבות אחת, lit. "Eight in the Footsteps of One")	Menahem Golan				
?	Contre l'analphabétisme	Yitzhak Yeshurun				
?	Mishpahat Simhon (Hebrew: משפחת שמחון, lit. "Simhon Family")	Joel Silberg		Comedy, Drama		
?	Ulai Terdu Sham (Hebrew: אולי תרדו שם, lit. "Won't You Come Down")	Amatsia Hiuni / Puchu	Yehuda Fuchs	Comedy		

== See also ==
- 1964 in Israel
