= Broken Barriers (1919 film) =

Broken Barriers - A Love Drama of the Ukraine
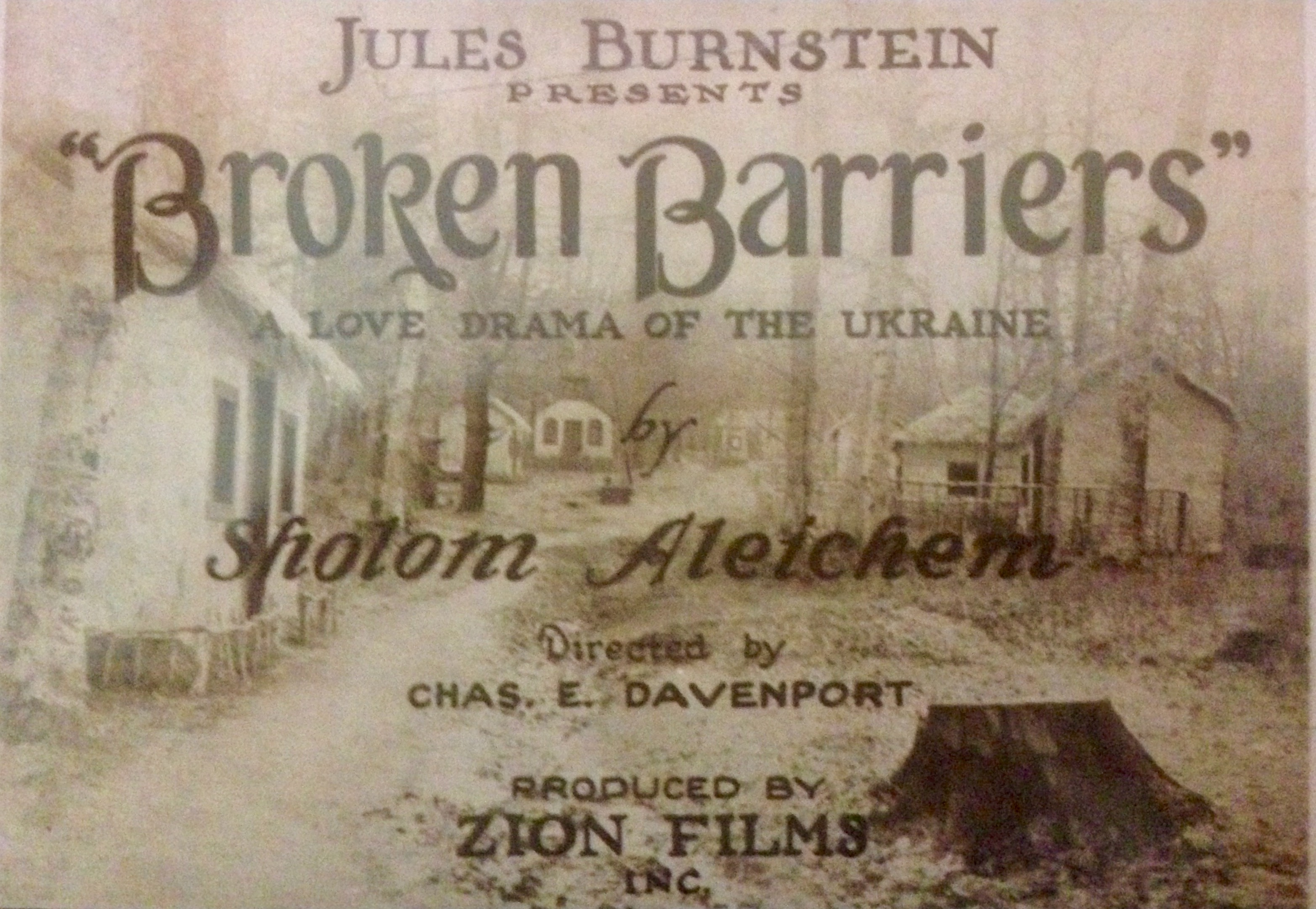
- Directed by: Charles E. Davenport
- Produced by: Jules Burnstein
- Distributed by: Zion Films Inc., Leopold Khelmann (father of Hannah)
- Release date: 1919
- Country: United States
- Languages: Yiddish; Russian

Broken Barriers, also known as Khava (Yiddish: חוה) is a 1919 American Yiddish silent film, based on author Sholem Aleichem's stock character Tevye the Dairyman.

== Cast ==
- Alice Hastings – Khava (Chava)
- Alexander Tenenholtz – Fedka (Fyedka)
- Giacomo Masuroff – Tobias (Tevye)
- Billie Wilson – Khava's Mother (Golde)
- Sonia Radin – Parasha
- Ivan, Fedka's Father
- Hanna (Ganna Kehlmann) Kay – Khavah's Sister (Tzeitel)
- Raymond (John Raymond) Friedgen – Fedka's chum (friend)

== Release and restoration ==
Long thought to be a lost film, an original copy was donated to the National Center for Jewish Film at Brandeis University for restoration by a descendant of one of the actors. The same story was the basis of the 1964 stage musical Fiddler on the Roof and its 1971 film version, though the fate of Khava in the ending had been altered.

== See also ==
- List of rediscovered films
