= List of Israeli films of 1963 =

A list of films produced by the Israeli film industry in 1963.

== 1963 releases ==
Premiere	Title	Director	Cast	Genre	Notes	Ref
?	El Dorado (Hebrew: אל דוראדו)	Menahem Golan		Drama		
?	Ha-Martef (Hebrew: המרתף, lit. "The Cellar")	Natan Gross		Drama		
?	Havura Shekazot (Hebrew: חבורה שכזאת, lit. "What a Gang)	Zeev Havatzelet	Gila Almagor, Yossi Banai	Comedy		
?	Af Milah L'Morgenstein (Hebrew: אף מילה למורגנשטיין, lit. "Not a Word to Morgenstein")	Arieh Elias, Benjamin Koretzki, Ben Oyserman	Gila Almagor			
?	Eshet Hagibor (Hebrew: אשת הגיבור, lit. "The Hero's Wife")	Peter Frye, Bomba Tzur		Drama		

== See also ==
- 1963 in Israel
