= List of Israeli films of 1970 =

A list of films produced by the Israeli film industry in 1970.

== 1970 releases ==
Premiere	Title	Director	Cast	Genre	Notes	Ref
?	Lupo! (Hebrew: לופו!)	Menahem Golan	Yehuda Barkan, Gabi Amrani	Drama		
?	Eagles Attack at Dawn (Hebrew: הפריצה הגדולה)	Menahem Golan	Yehoram Gaon, Joseph Shiloach	Drama, War		
?	Hitromemut (Hebrew: התרוממות, lit. "Take Off")	Uri Zohar		Comedy		
?	The Customer of the Off Season (Hebrew: אורח בעונה מתה)	Moshé Mizrahi		Drama, Mystery	An Israeli-French co-production; Entered into the 20th Berlin International Film Festival	
?	Ha-Simla (Hebrew: השימלה, lit. "The Dress")	Yehuda Ne'eman		Drama		
?	The Dreamer (Hebrew: התמהוני)	Dan Wolman		Drama	Entered into the 1970 Cannes Film Festival	

== See also ==
- 1970 in Israel
