= List of Israeli films of 1969 =

A list of films produced by the Israeli film industry in 1969.

== 1969 releases ==
Premiere	Title	Director	Cast	Genre	Notes	Ref
?	Matzor (Hebrew: מצור, lit. "Siege")	Gilberto Tofano	Gila Almagor, Yehoram Gaon	Drama	Entered into the 1969 Cannes Film Festival	
10 July	Blaumilch Canal (Hebrew: תעלת בלומליך, lit. "The Big Dig")	Ephraim Kishon	Bomba Tzur, Avner Hizkiyahu	Comedy	Nominated for Best Foreign Language Film at the 27th Golden Globe Awards	
?	Margo Sheli (Hebrew: מרגו שלי, lit. "My Margo")	Menahem Golan	Levana Finkelstein	Comedy, Drama		
?	Mikreh Isha (Hebrew: מקרה אישה, lit. "A Woman's Case")	Jacques Katmor	Aharon Almog, Tirzeh Arbel	Drama		
?	Ha Simla (Hebrew: השמלה, lit. "The Dress")	Judd Ne’eman	Assi Dayan, Liora Rivlin	Drama		
?	The Battle of Sinai (Hebrew: חמישה ימים בסיני, lit. "Five Days in Sinai")	Maurizio Lucidi	Franco Giornelli, Assi Dayan	War	Released in Israel in 1968, and in Italy, where the film was produced, in 1969	
?	Halomot (Hebrew: חלומות, lit. "Dreams")	Ya'akov Vardi	Pnina Gary, Pinhas Koren	Drama		
?	Moto Shel Yehudi (Hebrew: מוטו של יהודי, lit. "Death of a Jew")	Denys de La Patellière	Akim Tamiroff, Assi Dayan	Drama		
?	Ha-Milhamah L'Aher Hamilhamah (Hebrew: המלחמה לאחר המלחמה, lit. "The War After the War")	Micha Shagrir	Uri Goldstein, Yaron London	Documentary		

== See also ==
- 1969 in Israel
