= List of Israeli films of 2016 =

A list of films produced by the Israeli film industry released in 2016.

== List ==
Premiere	Title	Director	Cast	Genre	Notes	Ref.
15 January 2016	Sufat Chol (Sand Storm)	Elite Zexer	Lamis Ammar, Ruba Blal, Hitham Omari, Khadija Al Akel	Drama		
13 February 2016	Junction 48	Udi Aloni	Tamer Nafar, Samar Qupty, Salwa Nakkara, Saeed Dassuki	Action, Biography, Crime		
21 April 2016	Yeled Tov Yerushalyim	Roee Florentin	Yafit Asulin, Tzion Baruch, Meytal Gal, Guy Gurevich	Comedy, Romance		
15 May 2016	Shavua ve Yom (One Week and a Day)	Asaph Polonsky	Sharon Alexander, Shai Avivi, Tomer Capon, Evgenia Dodina	Comedy, Drama		
5 June 2016	Our Father (The Bouncer)	Meni Yaish	Dan Mor, Yaakov Zada Daniel, Doron Ben-David, Micha Celektar	Drama		
6 June 2016	Everything is Broken up and Dances	Nony Geffen	Gilat Ankori, Ella Armony, Dvir Benedek, Bea Brocks	Comedy, Drama, Music		
6 June 2016	Land of the Little People	Yaniv Berman	Maor Schwitzer, Ofer Hayoun, Shimrit Turner, Nimrod Hochenberg	Adventure, Drama, Thriller		
7 June 2016	Hadrei Habayit (Indoors)	Eitan Green	Aryeh Cherner, Osnat Fishman, Yiftach Kaminer, Jameel Khoury	Drama		
8 June 2016	Hayaar Shehaya (We Had A Forest)	Guy Raz	Meital Avni, Lana Ettinger, Eyal Heyne Galli, Boaz Konforty	Drama		
4 July 2016	Lev Shaket Meod (A Quiet Heart)	Eitan Anner	Gilat Ankori, Ludi Boken, Ania Bukstein, Tom Chodorov	Drama		
8 July 2016	Saving Neta	Nir Bergman	Rotem Abuhab, Emma Alfi Aharon, Naama Arlaky, Benny Avni	Drama		
12 July 2016	Me'Ever Laharim Vehagvaot (Beyond the Mountains and Hills)	Eran Kolirin	Alon Pdut, Mili Eshet, Shiree Nadav-Naor, Noam Imber	Drama		
15 July 2016	Children of the Fall	Eitan Gafny	Noa Maiman, Aki Avni, Yafit Shalev, Iftach Ophir	Drama, Horror, Thriller		
29 July 2016	Ismach Hatani (The Women's Balcony)	Emil Ben-Shimon	Evelin Hagoel, Igal Naor, Orna Banai, Einat Saruf	Comedy, Drama		
3 September 2016	Norman	Joseph Cedar	Richard Gere, Lior Ashkenazi, Michael Sheen, Steve Buscemi	Drama, Thriller		
21 September 2016	The Burglar	Hagar Ben-Asher	Lihi Kornowski, Ronald Zehrfeld, Shlomi Avraham, Yuval Avrahami	Drama		
21 September 2016	The Last Band in Lebanon	Ben Bachar, Itzik Kricheli	Ofer Hayoun, Ori Laizerouvich, Ofer Shechter, Ami Anidjar	Comedy		
7 October 2016	Antenna	Arik Rothstein	Gila Almagor, Michael Aloni, Alex Ansky, Hila Feldma8	Comedy, Drama		
17 October 2016	Milhemet 90 Hadakot	Eyal Halfon	Moshe Ivgy, Detlev Buck, Norman Issa, Majd Bitar	Comedy, Drama, Sport		
18 October 2016	Between Worlds	Miya Hatav	Maria Zreik, Maya Gasner, Yoram Toledano, Avi Dangur	Drama		
18 October 2016	Omor Shakhsiya	Maha Haj	Maisa Abd Elhadi, Ziad Bakri, Jihan Dermelkonian, Hanan Hillo	Drama		
22 October 2016	Hadereh lean	Michal Bat-Adam	Sharon Alexander, Nati Amos, Yafit Asulin, Lana Ettinger	Drama		
27 October 2016	Laavor et hakir	Rama Burshtein	Noa Koler, Amos Tamam, Oz Zehavi, Irit Sheleg	Comedy, Romance		
8 November 2016	Once There Was a Girl	Natalie Kaplan	Eli Danker, Liat Glick, Nicholas Jacob, Oded Leopold	Drama		
13 November 2016	Arba Al Arba (Four By Four)	Shay Kanot	Oshri Cohen, Roni Dalumi, Avi Dangur, Shlomi Koriat	Comedy		
16 November 2016	House Arrest	Jarrell Crump	Dennis Adams, Leonardo Black, Troy Boyce, Tamara Cook	Comedy, Drama		
29 November 2016	Harmonia	Ori Sivan	Alon Aboutboul, Tali Sharon, Ali Suliman, Yana Yossef	Drama		
1 December 2016	Past Life	Avi Nesher	Nelly Tagar, Joy Rieger, Doron Tavory, Evgenia Dodina	Drama		
25 December 2016	Cheer Me Up	Mili Ben Hayl, Tamar Shippony	Ofer Amram, Gili Saar, Ben Shellef	Drama		
29 December 2016	Anashim Shehem Lo Ani	Hadas Ben Aroya	Yonatan Bar-Or, Hadas Ben Aroya, Netser Charitt, Hagar Enosh	Drama, Romance		
