= Shmuel Rodensky =

Israeli actor (1902–1989)

- שמואל רודנסקי
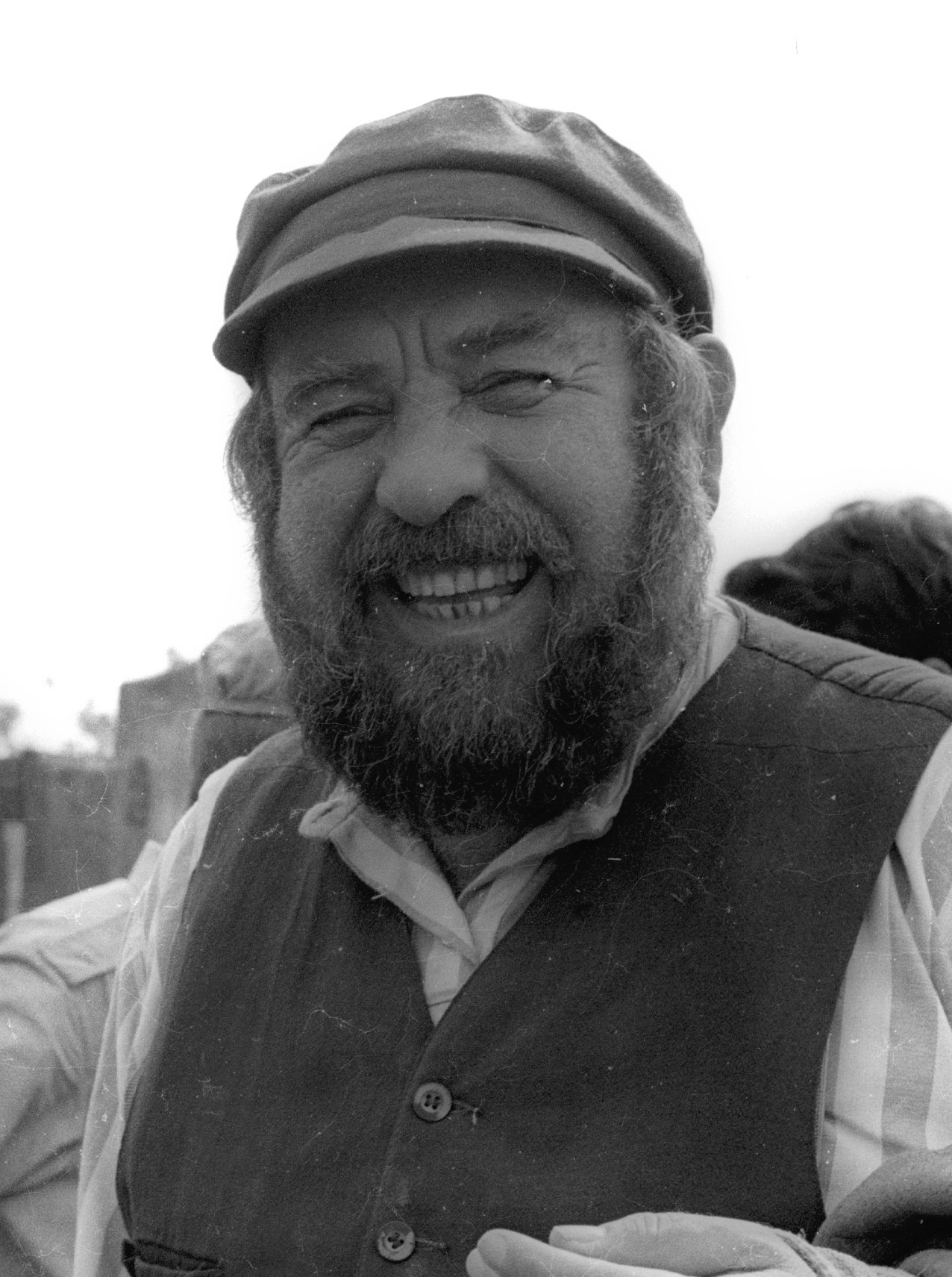
- Rodensky on the set of Tevye and His Seven Daughters, 1967
- Born: 10 December 1902; Smorgon, Vilna Governorate, Russian Empire
- Died: 18 July 1989 (aged 86); Tel Aviv, Israel
- Occupation: Actor
- Years active: 1928–1988
- Known for: The Three Shmuliks and Die Kleine Mentshalach at Habima Theatre; Tevye in Anatevka (German production of Fiddler on the Roof)
- Spouse: Raya Nura Shein (m. 1928)

Shmuel Rodensky (Hebrew: שמואל רודנסקי; 10 December 1902 (Note: According to the Munzinger-Archiv, Rodensky did not have a birth certificate and did not know his birthdate or birthplace. Israeli sources list Rodensky's birth year as 1902, while German sources give it as 1904 or 1906.) – 18 July 1989) was a Russian-born Israeli actor whose stage, film, and television career in Israel and West Germany spanned six decades. He immigrated to Mandatory Palestine in 1924 and studied drama at the Eretz Israel Theatre in Tel Aviv. After performing with several theatre companies between 1928 and 1948, he joined Habima Theatre in 1949 and became one of its principal players. He was known as "the Israeli Laurence Olivier". In 1968 Rodensky traveled to Hamburg to join the German-language production of Fiddler on the Roof (titled Anatevka), playing the lead role of Tevye the Dairyman. He performed this role more than 1,400 times throughout West Germany and Switzerland. His notable film roles include the lead in the 1968 Israeli film Tevye and His Seven Daughters, Simon Wiesenthal in the 1974 Anglo-German film The Odessa File, and Jethro in the 1974 BBC television miniseries Moses the Lawgiver. He was the recipient of numerous honors in both Israel and West Germany, including the Federal Service Cross from the Federal Republic of Germany and the Israel Prize.

== Early life ==
Shmuel Rodensky was born in Smorgon, Russian Empire, (Note: According to German biographical indices, he was born in Vilnius.) in 1902. During World War I he fled to Ukraine, but was expelled from the country during the Russian Revolution. He then traveled to Poland, entered Hamburg, Germany, on a forged Polish passport, and finally immigrated to Mandatory Palestine in 1924.

== Stage career ==
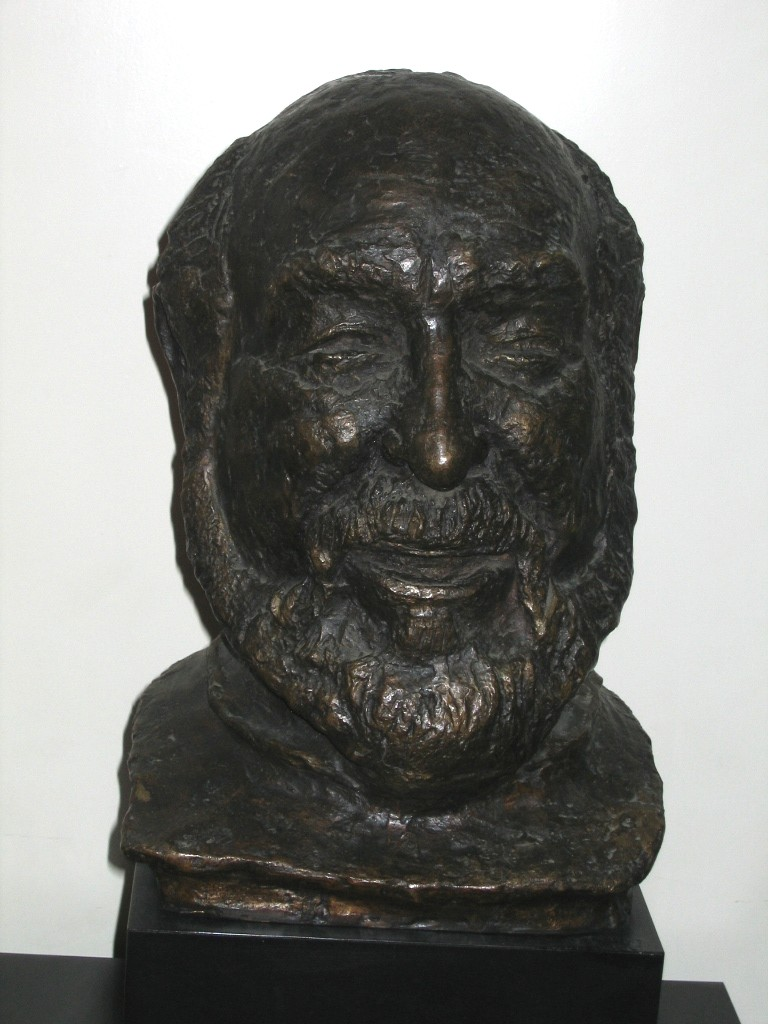
Bust of Shmuel Rodensky at the Habima Theatre

In his early years in Mandatory Palestine, Rodensky was employed in draining swamps, field work, and construction. He studied at the studio of drama at the Eretz Israel Theatre in Tel Aviv and performed with a number of theatre companies between 1928 and 1948, including the Eretz Israel Theatre, Hakumkum (The Kettle), and Hamatate (The Broom). In 1949 he responded to a newspaper advertisement seeking new performers at the Habima Theatre in Tel Aviv and became one of that theatre's principal players. He was known as "the Israeli Laurence Olivier".

At Habima, Rodensky performed a wide variety of dramatic roles, including Iago in Othello and the cardinal in The Deputy. He also performed satire, as in Ephraim Kishon's 1953 play Yiddishpiel.

Rodensky formed several artistic partnerships. He and another Habima actor named Shmuel, Shmuel Segal, created a Yiddish-speaking comedic team called The Shmuliks; they were later joined by a third Habima actor, Shmuel Atzmon. The Three Shmuliks performed in Israel and abroad. In 1985, The Three Shmuliks were part of the Israeli delegation of actors, writers, and public figures invited by the Polish government to the 35th-anniversary celebration of the Yiddish State Theater in Warsaw. With Segal and another Habima actor named Goldenberg, Rodensky was also a member of Die Kleine Mentshalach ("The Little People"), a Yiddish-language trio that performed dramatic readings of works by Sholem Aleichem. Rodensky formed a third, satirical trio with Jacob Timen and Esther Gamlielit of Hamatate (The Broom Theater).

=== Tevye the Dairyman ===
In 1965, Rodensky replaced Bomba Tzur in the role of Tevye the Dairyman in the second year of the Israeli production of the musical Fiddler on the Roof, staged at the Godik Theater. Rodensky went on to appear in 350 performances in Israel. During a 10–week absence due to illness, Rodensky was replaced by Chaim Topol, launching Topol's own career as Tevye on stage and screen. Rodensky briefly acted in a Yiddish-language production of the musical which was not as successful as the Hebrew-language ones. Rodensky reprised the role of Tevye on screen in the 1968 Israeli film Tevye and His Seven Daughters.

In 1968 Rodensky traveled to Hamburg to join the German-language production of Fiddler on the Roof, titled Anatevka, which premiered on February 1. Rodensky became popular throughout West Germany for his portrayal of Tevye, performing the role more than 1,400 times. He also toured with a production in Switzerland. He appeared on the German-language recording of the Hamburg premiere.

On September 4, 1972, the evening before a Palestinian terrorist group infiltrated the Israeli Olympic athletes' quarters during the 1972 Summer Olympics in Munich, the Israeli team attended a German-language performance of Fiddler on the Roof at the Deutsches Theater in Munich as guests of Rodensky, the lead actor. The Israelis received glasses of wine during the intermission and posed for pictures with Rodensky.

The last play in which Rodensky acted was "The Spine", which premiered on January 10, 1988 at the Habima Theatre. He played the role of Dr. Willy. The production ran for only seven performances and then was closed in deference to Rodensky's illness. Rodensky died the following year.

== Film and television ==
Rodensky first appeared on screen in the 1935 Israeli film Zot Hi Ha'aretz (This is the Land). He was cast as Reb Pinchas in the Israeli film Shnei Kuni Lemel (The Flying Matchmaker), which was the Israeli entry for the Academy Award for Best Foreign Language Film in 1966. Other notable roles included Tevye in the 1968 Israeli film Tevye and His Seven Daughters, Simon Wiesenthal in the 1974 Anglo-German film The Odessa File, and Jethro in the BBC television miniseries Moses the Lawgiver. Rodensky appeared in other film and television roles in West Germany and Switzerland.

== Honors and awards ==
Rodensky received numerous honors and awards in Israel and West Germany. In 1983 he received the Federal Service Cross from the Federal Republic of Germany, and the Rudolf Küstermeier Prize in Tel Aviv, the latter recognizing his contribution to "the interpretation of Israeli culture in West Germany".

Rodensky was named a Worthy Citizen of Tel Aviv in 1982. He received the Israel Prize for lifetime achievement in 1983 and the Meyer Margalit Prize in 1984.

President of Germany Gustav Heinemann praised Rodensky as "Israel's greatest ambassador of reconciliation".

== Personal life ==
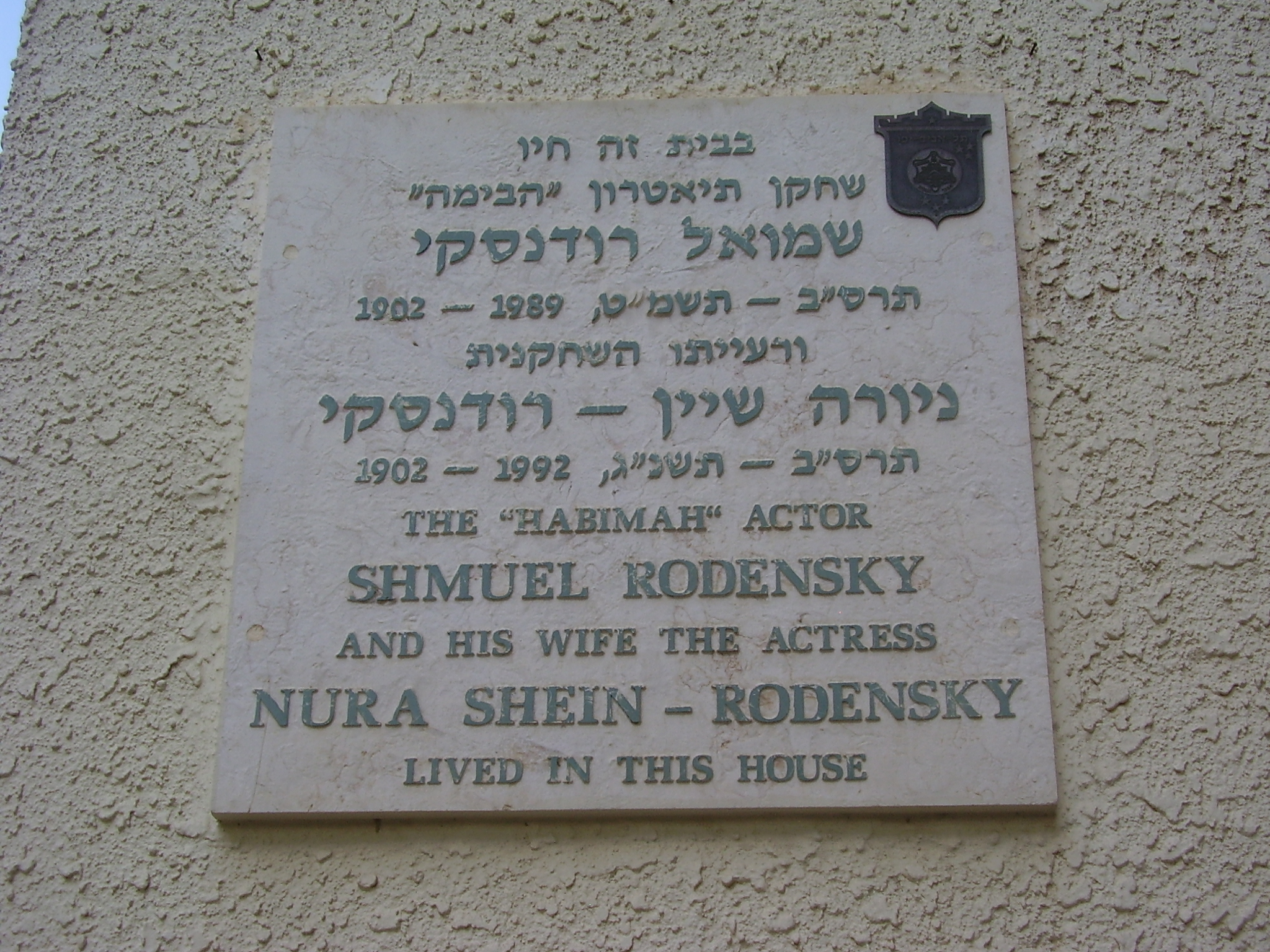
Plaque outside the home where Rodensky and his wife lived in Tel Aviv

Rodensky met his wife, stage actress Raya Nura Shein, when both were studying at the Eretz Israel Theatre. They married in 1928.

Rodensky died of a heart attack in Tel Aviv on 18 July 1989. Notwithstanding his fame, he died impoverished.

In 2001–2002 the Tel Aviv Municipality affixed a memorial plaque to Rodensky's home at 1 Rachel Street as part of its effort to honor artists and intellectuals who had resided in the city.

== Filmography ==
Film
Year	Title	Role	Notes
1935	Zot Hi Ha'aretz (This is the Land)		
1956	Ma'aseh B'Monit (Tel Aviv Taxi)	Boss	
1963	Rak Ba'Lira (A Pound a Piece)		
1964	Sallah Shabati		
1964	Ha-Etmol Shel Maher (Tomorrow's Yesterday)		
1965	Impossible on Saturday		
1965	Shabbat Hamalka (The Sabbath Queen)		
1966	Shnei Kuni Lemel (The Flying Matchmaker)	Reb Pinchas	
1968	Tuviya VeSheva B'notav (Tevye and His Seven Daughters)	Tevye	
1970	Heintje – Mein bester Freund	Aljoscha	
1971	Katz V'Carasso (Katz and Carasso)	Shmuel Katz	
1973	Scorpio	Lang	
1973	Libero	Himself	
1974	The Odessa File	Simon Wiesenthal	
1976	The Sell Out	Zafron	
1977	Operation Thunderbolt	Dr. Weissberg	
1977	Hershele	Canak	
1977	Doda Clara (Aunt Clara)	Meir	
1978	Der Gehilfe	Morris Bober	TV movie
1979	Jesus	Annas	
1986	Alex Holeh Ahavah (Alex is Lovesick)	Rabbi	(final film role)

Television
Year	Title	Role	Notes
1973	Rückstände	Sachs	
1974	Moses the Lawgiver	Jethro	
1981	Silas	Bartolin	
1985	Levin und Gutman	Sammy Levin	German miniseries, 11 episodes

== Discography ==
Rodensky's recordings include:

=== Albums ===
- Shmuel Rodensky Singt Lieder Seiner Heimat In Deutscher Sprache [Shmuel Rodensky Sings Songs of His Homeland in German Language] (1968)
- Anatevka (Deutsche Originalaufnahme) (Anatevka original German-language recording) (1968)
- Shmuel Rodensky Liest Satiren Von Ephraim Kishon (Shmuel Rodensky Reads Satires by Ephraim Kishon) (1974)

=== Singles ===
- Wenn Ich Einmal Reich Wär / Zum Wohl ["If I Were a Rich Man"] (1968)

== Sources ==
- Gifford, Denis, ed. (2016). The British Film Catalogue. Vol. 2. Routledge. ISBN 9781317740636.
- Kronish, Amy; Safirman, Costel (2003). Israeli Film: A Reference Guide. Greenwood Publishing Group. ISBN 9780313321443.
- Isenberg, Barbara (2014). Tradition!. St. Martin's Press. ISBN 9781466862524.
- Reeve, Simon (2000). One Day in September. Arcade Publishing. ISBN 9781559705479.
