= Ziv Rubinstein =

Israeli musical artist

Ziv Rubinstein זיו רובינשטיין
- Born: 20 March 1970 (age 56); Tel Aviv, Israel
- Genres: Folk rock, Pop rock
- Years active: 1983–present

Ziv Rubinstein (Hebrew: זיו רובינשטיין; born 20 March 1970) is an Israeli composer, songwriter and television producer.

== Biography ==
Ziv Rubinstein was born and raised in Tel Aviv, Israel. He learned how to play the guitar at the age of eleven. When he was only 13, he performed with a teenage band named "Blood". At 15, he performed with a band named Ursula alongside Zeevik Gunthersky (drums), Yoram Zak (guitar), Gili Babliki (bass guitar), Gili Efi (piano), and Osnat Dar (singer).

He appeared in several public-service advertisements (IAF Technological College, Be'er Sheva, Friends of the Israel Defense Forces, Israel Dairy Board, among others).

=== The Michelle Pfeiffer Incident ===
In 1992, on the Israeli popular prime time entertainment show The Entertainment Authority, hosted by Dudu Topaz, Ziv was challenged to go to Los Angeles and have his photo taken with Michelle Pfeiffer. Rubinstein returned a week later, at the next show, with a photograph of himself with Michelle Pfeiffer. However, two days later it was revealed that he was photographed with a cardboard cut-out and not the real actress. It appeared he knew in advance what the challenge would be. In order to stand out in the audience and have Dudu Topaz select him, he wore a big hat. This incident was mentioned in the list of the greatest scandals and pranks in the history of Israeli entertainment at Yedioth Ahronoth and Globes magazine.

=== "The Babies" Band ===
In 1998 Rubinstein founded "The Babies" Band along with Reuven Hayun. The band released one album carrying its name, musically produced by Meir Israel. The album was not a big success in sales, but the band performed with its songs throughout Israel. In 2000, Rubinstein composed the championship song for the Israeli soccer team Hapoel Tel Aviv F.C. and the band performed at the championship celebrations at the Yarkon Park. In 2002 the band performed at Rabin Square in a national rally promoting youth road safety. In 2004, Reuven Hayun and Nir Segal, the band's drummer, left the band, replaced by Yovav Avraham and Eyal Kochel.

=== Solo albums ===
In 2006, Rubinstein's first EP "As If There is No Sea" Debuted. The album included six songs, and was musically produced by Razi Ben-Ezzer. Two of the songs were released as singles: "Blue" and "My Beloved Homeland" which was honorably mentioned by the Israeli parliament member Ahmad Tibi in the Israeli media. The "Blue" music video was one of the most aired videos on the Israeli Music Channel. In 2011 Rubinstein started working on a second album, of which two songs were released. On 1 January 2013, his second solo album was released.

=== Collaborations With Other Artists ===
In 2007 Rubinstein released a duet with the Israeli singer, Daphna Armony, named "Rak Ohev". The duet was chosen song of the week on the Kol Yisrael Reshet Gimel radio station. in 2008 Rubinstein started collaborating with the Israeli musician Arkadi Duchin, and together they wrote the duet "Hadavar Haze" (That Thing), performed by Rubinstein and Sima Levi Duchin, Arkadi's wife. in 2009 they produced the children's album "Arkasha's Friends". Many Israeli artists participated in this album – David D'Or, Dani Litani, Idan Yaniv, and Micky Kamm, among others. The album reached Gold Album in Israel. In 2010 Duchin composed Rubinstein's song "Ahavati Haasura" (My Forbidden Love), that was published in his poetry book "Shira, Ahuvati" (Poetry, My Love). In 2011 Duchin and Rubinstein wrote a song for the Israeli singer Liran Tal. In 2008 Rubinstein wrote the song "Angel" for Shlomi Shabat, as well as the song "Without You", which Shabat performed with Daphna Rechter. In 2010 Rubinstein wrote another song for Shlomi Shabat, "Vaani Shar" (And I Sing), which later became the mentor song for the first season of "The Voice Israel". Rubinstein wrote several other songs for Shabat. In 2012 Nahum Heyman composed two of Rubinstein's songs, performed by Yoni Schlesinger in Heyman's last album "Ani Mamshich Lashir" (I Go on Singing). During 2020 he composed the song "Voy a cantar" for the Gipsy Kings.

=== Production ===
Since 2000, alongside his musical work, Ziv was also the news producer for 10 News on the Israeli Channel 10. He left the network during 2013 and opened an independent production company.

=== Poetry ===
In 2010 Rubinstein published his first poetry book "Shira, Ahuvati" (Poetry, My Love).
