= Bar 51 =

- Film poster
- Hebrew: בר 51
- Directed by: Amos Guttman
- Written by: Dudu Barak; Yeshayahu (Shaike) Paikov
- Based on: Himmo, King of Jerusalem by Edna Mazia
- Produced by: David Lipkind; Enrique Rottenberg
- Starring: Alon Abutbul; Juliano Mer-Khamis; Smadar Kilchinsky; Rahel Shor; Belinka Metzner; Irit Sheleg
- Cinematography: Yossi Wein
- Edited by: Tova Ascher
- Music by: Arik Rudich; Shimrit Or
- Production company: Herzliya Studios
- Distributed by: Shapira Films
- Release date: 1986
- Running time: 95 minutes
- Country: Israel
- Languages: Hebrew; English
- Budget: $400,000

Bar 51 (Hebrew: בר 51) is a 1986 Israeli independent underground drama film directed by Amos Guttman and cowritten with Edna Mazia and Eli Tavor.

== Plot ==
The film deals with Thomas's incestuous love for his sister, Mariana: After they arrive together in Tel Aviv-Yafo, after escaping from Migdal HaEmek due to the death of their Christian mother, Ewa, and setting up housekeeping in the sleazy side of town, Thomas makes his money as "kept man" for two different women who are nightclub entertainers at a bar filled with homosexual, deformed, and inebriated workers, Luna and Zara a.k.a. Sarah Azulay. He first attempts to work at a hotel, but he is fired upon being caught stealing supplies for Mariana. He then has to resort to a dirty shelter. At the same time, he attracts the attentions of an amorous transvestite prostitute and stripper (“Ada Valerie-Tal” i.e. Sergiu Valerie) named "Apolonia Goldstein" (a character based on Gila Goldstein who performed in a real-life bar called Bar 51) who allows the siblings to live at his apartment. His unnatural love for his sister goes unexpressed, however, his jealousy cannot be controlled. If his sister wants to lead any sort of a normal life, it will be up to her to break her dependence on her brother and move on. The film, developed at Herzliya Studios and distributed by Shapira Films, stars inter alia Alon Abutbul, Mosko Alkalai, Poly Reshef, and David Wilson and features music by Arik Rudich and Shimrit Or (in addition to a song performed by Sarah'le Sharon and written by Dudu Barak and Yeshayahu (Shaike) Paikov), cinematography by Yossi Wein, editing by Tova Ascher, and production by Enrique Rottenberg and Efrat Stieglitz. The film ends with Thomas violently raping Mariana, following by her killing him.

== Cast ==
- Juliano Mer-Khamis as Thomas
- Smadar Kilchinsky as Mariana
- Rahel Shor as Ewa
- Belinka Metzner as Luna
- Irit Sheleg as Zara
- Alon Abutbul as Aranjuez
- Ada Valerie-Tal as Apollonia
- Mosko Alkalai as Karl
- David Patrick Wilson as Nicholas

== Reception ==
Journalist Yael Israel favorably compared this film to the works of Rainer Werner Fassbinder and Martin Scorsese, journalist Nachman Ingber blasted the film for its lack of "style" though he nonetheless called it one of the great Israeli films of the 1980s, while journalist Daniel Warth also noted the similarities to Fassbinder and Pier Paolo Pasolini, yet claimed that these remained on the surface only, as this film lacked a "message". Nevertheless, more recently, it came out as the 30th best Israeli film out of 40 listed in a poll of critics conducted by Maariv, and also received two votes (Marat Parkhomovsky and Yael Shuv) in a similar 2018 survey of critics. The film, whose budget was said to be the equivalent of $400,000, was awarded several prizes by the Israeli Ministry of Economy and was screened at Chicago International Film Festival, despite being a commercial failure with only 32,000 tickets sold. The film was released on DVD in Israel by Third Ear DVDs as part of a boxset containing the complete filmography of Guttman and an equivalent boxset was released in France by Bach Films. Several nowadays notable Israeli film people, such as Rona Doron, Levia Hon, and Yoni Hamenachem, started out as crew bit parts on this film and it is said to be a big influence on Sivan Levy, who covered some of its music (such as the 1937 song "My Funny Valentine" by Richard Rodgers and Lorenz Hart). A main character in Guttman's 1992 film Amazing Grace is also called Thomas, probably as homage to this film. A restaurant named after this film has opened in Tel Aviv-Yafo in 2019.
