= List of Israeli films of 1987 =

A list of films produced by the Israeli film industry in 1987.

== 1987 releases ==
=== Unknown premiere date ===
| Premiere | Title | Director | Cast | Genre | Notes | Ref |
|---|---|---|---|---|---|---|
| ? | Late Summer Blues (Hebrew: בלוז לחופש הגדול) | Renen Schorr | Yoav Tzafir, Shahar Segal, Dor Zweigenboim, Noa Goldberg | Drama, Romance | | |
| ? | Lemon Popsicle VII (Hebrew: אסקימו לימון 7 - אהבה צעירה) | Walter Bannert | Yftach Katzur, Zachi Noy, Jonathan Sagall | Comedy | Israeli-German co-production | |
| ? | Himmo Melech Yerushalaim (Hebrew: חימו מלך ירושלים, lit. "Himmo, King of Jerusalem") | Amos Guttman | Alona Kimhi | Drama | | |
| ? | Ha-Muvtal Batito (Hebrew: המובטל בטיטו, lit. "Batito Is Unemployed") | Ze'ev Revach | Ze'ev Revach | Comedy | | |
| ? | Deadline (Hebrew: עד לאזור לחימה) | Nathaniel Gutman | Christopher Walken | Drama | Israeli-American-German co-production | |
| ? | Beauty and the Beast | Eugene Marner | John Savage, Rebecca De Mornay | Family, Fantasy, Musical | Israeli-American co-production | |
| ? | Nipagesh Bachof (Hebrew: נפגש בחוף, lit. "We'll meet at the beach") | Yehuda Barkan and Yigal Shilon | | Comedy | | |
| ? | Ha-Tov, HaRa, VeHaLo-Nora (Hebrew: הטוב, הרע, והלא נורע, lit. "Good, the Bad, and the Not So Bad") | Assi Dayan | | Drana | | |
| ? | Abba Ganuv (Hebrew: אבא גנוב, lit. "Superb dad") | Jacob Goldwasser | Yehuda Barkan, Alona Kimhi, Ben Tzion | Drama, Comedy | | |
| ? | I Don't Give a Damn (Hebrew: לא שם זין) | Shmuel Imberman | Ika Zohar, Anat Waxman, Shmuel Vilozni | Drama | | |
| ? | Photo Roman (Hebrew: פוטו רומן) | Assi Dayan and Tal Ron | Alon Aboutboul | Drama | | |

== Awards ==
| === Ophir Award === | === Wolgin Award === |

== See also ==
- 1987 in Israel
