= List of Israeli actors =

This is a list of Israeli actors.

== Israeli actors ==
=== A ===
- Hiam Abbass
- Yael Abecassis - Kadosh, Alila
- Alon Abutbul
- Michael Aloni
- Gila Almagor - The House on Chelouche Street
- Lior Ashkenazi
- Adi Ashkenazi
- David Avidan
- Mili Avital - Stargate
- Aki Avni

=== B ===
- Gavri Banai
- Orna Banai
- Yossi Banai
- Yehuda Barkan - Charlie Ve'hetzi, Hagiga B'Snuker
- Yael Bar Zohar
- Michal Bat-Adam
- Heinz Bernard
- Shmil Ben Ari
- Dvir Benedek

=== C ===
- Asi Cohen - Yossi & Jagger
- Eddie Carmel
- Tomer Capone - The Boys

=== D ===
- Jason Danino-Holt
- Boaz Davidson
- Assi Dayan
- Raz Degan - Alexander

=== E ===
- Arik Einstein - Lool, Metzitzim
- Anat Elimelech
- Ronit Elkabetz - Or (My Treasure)
- Maya Eshet
- Mili Eshet

=== F ===
- Amit Farkash
- Oded Fehr - The Mummy
- Rami Fortis
- Tal Friedman

=== G ===
- Sasson Gabai
- Gal Gadot
- Uri Gavriel
- Gidi Gov
- Yael Grobglas

=== H ===
- Haya Harareet
- Liat Har Lev - Eretz Nehederet
- Tomer Heymann

=== I ===
- Shira Haas
- Moshe Ivgi
- Dana Ivgy - Or (My Treasure)

=== K ===
- Nir Jacob Kaplan
- Makram Khoury
- Avi Kornick

=== L ===
- Sivan Levy - Ima'lle, Burning Mooki
- Daliah Lavi - Casino Royale
- Yehuda Levi - Yossi & Jagger

=== M ===
- Aharon Meskin
- Yali Topol Margalith
- Maya Maron
- Hanna Maron
- Juliano Mer-Khamis
- Keren Mor
- Moni Moshonov - Hatuna Meuheret
- Ido Mosseri

=== N ===
- Igal Naor
- Zachi Noy

=== O ===
- Shaike Ophir

=== P ===
- Eyal Podell
- Natalie Portman - V for Vendetta

=== R ===
- Shuli Rand - Ushpizin
- Michal Batsheva Rand - Ushpizin
- Lior Raz
- Ze'ev Revach - Charlie Ve'hetzi, Hagiga B'Snuker
- Hanna Rieber
- Agam Rodberg
- Sasha Roiz
- Hanna Rovina
- Agam Rodberg

=== S ===
- Sirak M. Sabahat
- Jonathan Sagall
- Ruth Sagall
- Maya Shoef
- Gene Simmons
- Niv Sultan

=== T ===
- Alona Tal
- Noa Tishby
- Chaim Topol - Fiddler on the Roof
- Tuvia Tzafir
- Yon Tumarkin

=== V ===
- Yedidya Vital

=== W ===
- Yahav Winner

=== Y ===
- Michal Yannai
- Eli Yatzpan
- Galia Yishai

=== Z ===
- Uri Zohar
- Ayelet Zorer (Ayelet July Zurer)
- Bat-Sheva Zeisler

== See also ==
- List of Israelis
- Culture of Israel
