= List of submissions to the 66th Academy Awards for Best Foreign Language Film =

1993 Best Foreign Language Film submissions
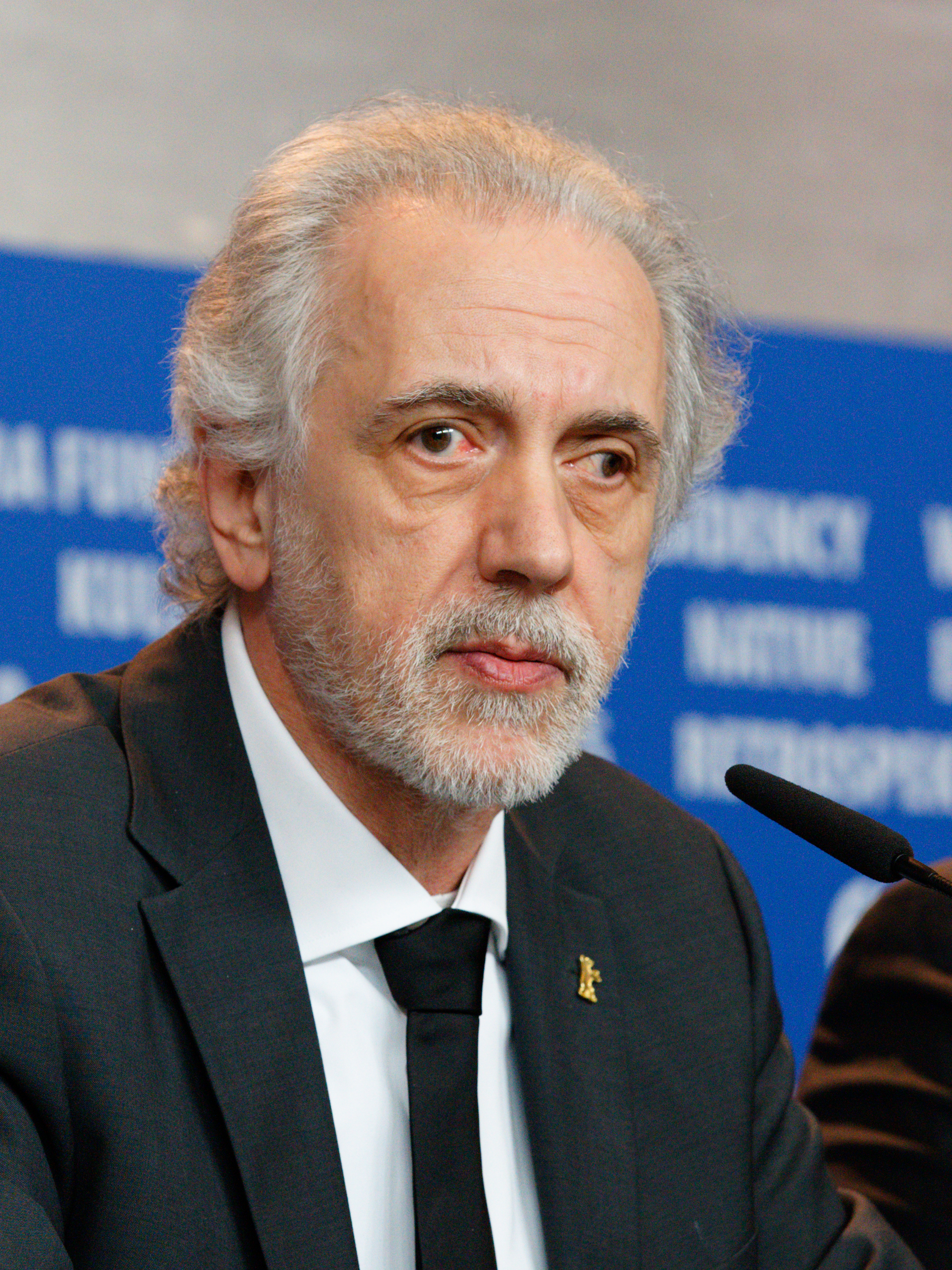
- Fernando Trueba directed Belle Époque, which won the year's award.

Highlights
- Oscar winner: (Spain) Belle Époque
- Submissions: 35
- Debuts: 3
- Total eligible: 35

This is a list of submissions to the 66th Academy Awards for the Best Foreign Language Film. The Academy of Motion Picture Arts and Sciences (AMPAS) has invited the film industries of various countries to submit their best film for the Academy Award for Best Foreign Language Film every year since the award was created in 1956. The award is presented annually by the Academy to a feature-length motion picture produced outside the United States that contains primarily non-English dialogue. The Foreign Language Film Award Committee oversees the process and reviews all the submitted films.

Beginning with the 66th ceremony, rules were changed to the submission process requesting applications to include a new form detailing information about the nationalities of the film's creative team, due to the controversy that had led to the disqualification of Uruguay at the 65th Academy Awards.

For the 66th Academy Awards, the submitted motion pictures must have first been released theatrically in their respective countries between 1 November 1992 and 31 October 1993. The deadline for submissions to the Academy was 1 November 1993. 35 countries submitted films and were found to be eligible by AMPAS and screened for voters. Slovakia, Slovenia, and Vietnam submitted films for the first time. The five nominees were announced on 9 February 1994.

Spain won the award for the second time with Belle Époque by Fernando Trueba.

== Submissions ==
Submitting country	Film title used in nomination	Original title	Language(s)	Director(s)	Result
Argentina	Gatica, the Monkey	Gatica, el mono	Spanish	Leonardo Favio	Not nominated
Austria	India		Viennese German, German	Paul Harather	Not nominated
Belgium	Just Friends		French, Dutch	Marc-Henri Wajnberg	Not nominated
Bulgaria	Canary Season	Сезонът на канарчетата	Bulgarian	Evgeni Mihailov	Not nominated
Canada	The Sex of the Stars	Le sexe des étoiles	French	Paule Baillargeon	Not nominated
Chile	Johnny 100 Pesos	Johnny cien pesos	Spanish	Gustavo Graef Marino	Not nominated
China	Country Teachers	凤凰琴	Mandarin	He Qun	Not nominated
Croatia	Countess Dora	Kontesa Dora	Croatian	Zvonimir Berković	Not nominated
Denmark	Black Harvest	Sort høst	Danish	Anders Refn	Not nominated
Finland	Ripa Hits the Skids	Ripa ruostuu	Finnish	Christian Lindblad	Not nominated
France	Germinal		French, Picard	Claude Berri	Not nominated
Germany	Justice	Justiz	German	Hans W. Geißendörfer	Not nominated
Hong Kong	Farewell My Concubine	霸王別姬	Mandarin	Chen Kaige	Nominated
Hungary	We Never Die	Sose halunk meg	Hungarian, Hebrew	Róbert Koltai	Not nominated
Iceland	The Sacred Mound	Hin helgu vé	Icelandic	Hrafn Gunnlaugsson	Not nominated
India	Rudaali	रुदाली	Hindi	Kalpana Lajmi	Not nominated
Israel	Revenge of Itzik Finkelstein	נקמתו של איציק פינקלשטיין	Hebrew, Spanish	Enrique Rottenberg	Not nominated
Italy	The Great Pumpkin	Il grande cocomero	Italian	Francesca Archibugi	Not nominated
Japan	Madadayo	まあだだよ	Japanese	Akira Kurosawa	Not nominated
Mexico	Cronos		Spanish, English	Guillermo del Toro	Not nominated
Netherlands	The Little Blonde Death	De kleine blonde dood	Dutch	Jean van de Velde	Not nominated
Norway	The Telegraphist	Telegrafisten	Nordland Norwegian, Swedish	Erik Gustavson	Not nominated
Peru	Report on Death	Reportaje a la muerte	Spanish	Danny Gavidia	Not nominated
Poland	Squadron	Szwadron	Polish, Russian	Juliusz Machulski	Not nominated
Portugal	Abraham's Valley	Vale Abraão	Portuguese	Manoel de Oliveira	Not nominated
Romania	The Conjugal Bed	Patul conjugal	Romanian	Mircea Daneliuc	Not nominated
Slovakia	Everything I Like	Všetko čo mám rád	Slovak, Czech	Martin Šulík	Not nominated
Slovenia	When I Close My Eyes	Ko zaprem oči	Slovene	Franci Slak	Not nominated
Spain	Belle Époque		Spanish, French	Fernando Trueba	Won Academy Award
Sweden	The Slingshot	Kådisbellan	Swedish	Åke Sandgren	Not nominated
Switzerland	The Diary of Lady M	Le journal de Lady M	French, Spanish	Alain Tanner	Not nominated
Taiwan	The Wedding Banquet	喜宴	Mandarin, Shanghainese, English	Ang Lee	Nominated
Turkey	The Blue Exile	Mavi Sürgün	Turkish	Erden Kıral	Not nominated
United Kingdom	Hedd Wyn		Welsh, English	Paul Turner	Nominated
Vietnam	The Scent of Green Papaya	Mùi đu đủ xanh / L'odeur de la papaye verte	Vietnamese	Trần Anh Hùng	Nominated
