= Drifting (1982 film) =

- Directed by: Amos Guttman
- Written by: Amos Guttman; Edna Mazia
- Produced by: Kislev Films; Malka Assaf; Enrique Rottenberg; Amos Guttman; Edna Mazia
- Starring: Jonathan Sagall; Ami Traub; Ben Levin; Dita Arel; Boaz Torjemann; Mark Hasmann
- Music by: Arik Rudich
- Distributed by: North America -; Facets Multi-Media; Nu Image Films
- Release dates: 1982 (Israel); 23 April 1984 (U.S.)
- Running time: 80 minutes
- Country: Israel
- Language: Hebrew

Drifting (a.k.a. Nagu'a) is an independent film directed and co-written by Amos Guttman. Filmed in 1982 and released commercially a year later, it is one of the first Israeli LGBT-themed films, and follows a lonely young gay man as he attempts to find love and break into the movie business. The film is in Hebrew. Sometimes the film's title is translated as Afflicted.

In the film's opening monologue, Robbie states the following words that express frustration with the portrayal of LGBTQ characters in Israeli cinema:

If the film were to address a social issue or have political awareness, it should feature a soldier, a resident of a development town, someone serving on a destroyer, a war widow, someone who has become religious. But if you must, make him gay. Let him suffer. At least let him not enjoy it... The country is burning, there is no time for self-exploration, there is a war now. There is always a war. The audience here won’t accept it, there are deceased relatives. Why would they identify with me? The gay association doesn’t even want to hear about the films I made. Not positive films, not films that present things in the desired light.

Critic Janet Maslin notes that Gutman portrays Robbie in a powerful and largely unsentimental way, capturing his complexities without resorting to sentimentality, however, she also finds that the film lacks "narrative energy".

== Plot ==
The film tells the story of Robbie (Jonathan Sagall), a young gay man who lives with his grandmother and works in her grocery store. His mother abandoned him and moved to Germany, where she runs a restaurant. He has little to no contact with his father.

Robbie has two obsessions in life: to make a movie that will be the first cheerful film to win an Oscar, and men. He is a foreign immigrant in his own country, not only because of his name but also because he is a second-generation Holocaust survivor. Robbie lives like a tiger in a cage.

During the day, he works in the grocery store, walks in the park, meets with friends, and at night, he goes to look for sex in Independence Park, engages in sexual relations in club bathrooms, and brings two Palestinian terrorists to his home, with whom he has sex.

Robbie's grandmother reads women's magazines in German and plays Rummy to the sound of Strauss's music. Her only involvement in the country's life is calling Arabs terrorists. She herself is ashamed of Robbie but tolerates his homosexuality, preferring to ignore the men he brings home and avoid asking why he regularly visits the park. Yet, they view his sexual orientation as being shameful not only to him, but to the entire family. When upset, his grandmother yells at him, and asks when he is going to find a nice woman, marry and start a family. His ex-girlfriend would love to get back together, but Robi has fallen in love with a man named Han, who caved into the social pressure and married a woman.

Robbie's father, a Holocaust survivor with a heavy foreign accent, tries to explain to his son that the norm is a family with a wife and children, and gay men grow old alone. In one of the film's boldest scenes, Robbie runs into his high school friend (Doron Regev) and vents all his anger on him, about the bullying and how his friend was afraid to talk to him for fear of being laughed at for being friends with the "degenerate." The film ends with Robbie failing to find any investors for his film, and he comes to terms with being gay.

== Cast ==
- Jonathan Sagall as Robi
- Ami Traub as Han
- Ben Levin as Ezri
- Dita Arel as Rachel
- Boaz Torjemann as Baba
- Mark Hasmann as Robi's father
