= Gila Goldstein =

Israeli sex worker, actress, singer and transgender rights activist (1947-2017)

- גילה גולדשטיין
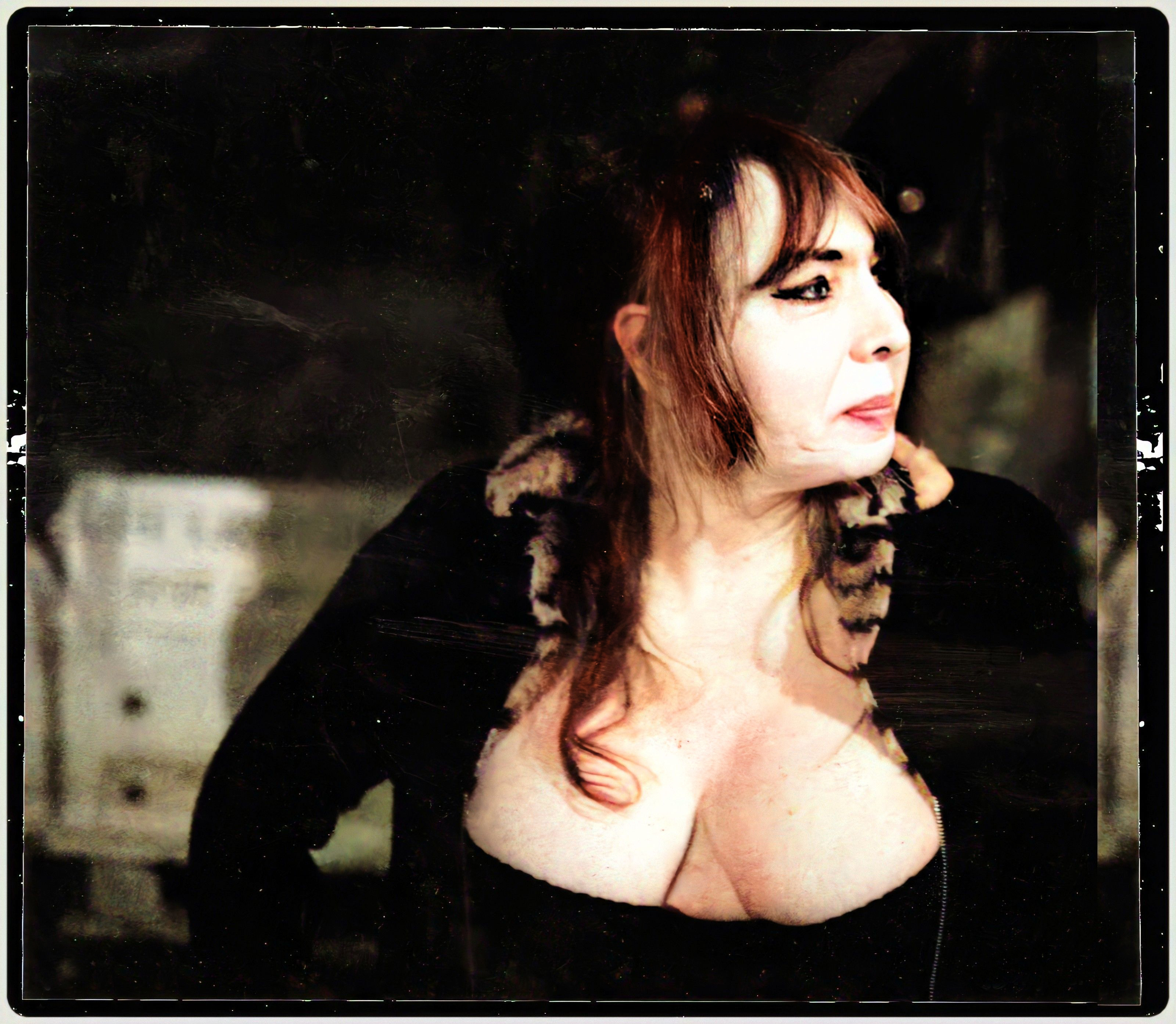
- Born: 18 December 1947; Turin, Italy
- Died: 5 February 2017 (aged 69); Tel Aviv, Israel
- Occupations: Actress; singer; activist; sex worker

Gila Goldstein (Hebrew: גילה גולדשטיין; 18 December 1947 – 5 February 2017) was an Israeli sex worker, actress, singer and transgender rights activist. She was one of the first activists of the Aguda, the oldest and largest LGBT organization in Israel. She is considered Israel's second openly transgender star (after Ada Valerie-Tal) and is one of the most prominent icons of the LGBTQIA+ movement in Israel.

== Biography ==
Gila Goldstein was born in Turin and assigned male at birth. After immigrating to Israel, she lived in Haifa. Goldstein realized she was transgender in 1960 and changed her name to Gila. She engaged in survival sex in Haifa before having gender affirming surgery in Belgium in 1965 – the first officially documented gender affirming surgery for an Israeli. In the early 1970s, Goldstein lived in Europe and worked as a dancer and striptease performer. When she returned to Israel, she performed in nightclubs and bars, including Bar 51. She served as the prototype of one of the characters in the film Bar 51 directed by Amos Guttman.

Goldstein recorded several songs and performed them at Allenby 58 in the 1990s. In 1998, together with Nino Orsiano she had a music program on the local radio.

She was awarded the Israeli LGBT community prize in 2003 and Miami LGBT Film Festival Award for the best supporting actress for her role in Good Boys in 2005. In 2010, a documentary film was made about her life. An organization that provides assistance to transgender people was named after her in 2011. In 2015, in recognition of her service to the community, she had the honor to go at the head of the Tel Aviv pride parade.

== Death ==
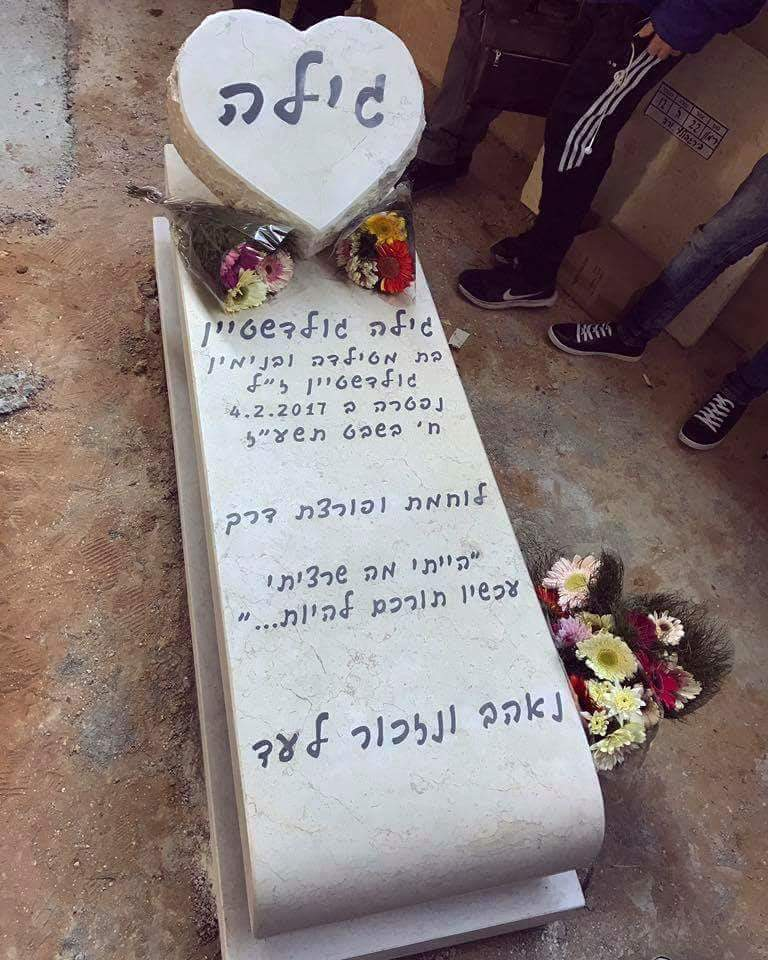
Grave of Gila Goldstein

Gila Goldstein died of a stroke on 5 February 2017. Her death was announced, in some places, as the death of a "male" named "Ilan Ronen", which was the name on Goldstein's ID card. Friends said Goldstein invented the name for bureaucratic reasons. In response, Goldstein's great-nephew said that no government record could change the fact that Goldstein was always a woman, and the family promised that her grave would display the name "Gila Goldstein". The funeral was attended by actors, politicians, and representatives of the LGBT community.

== Filmography ==
- 2003 "Kulan" Hebrew.
- 2005 "Good boys". Grace, mother of Manny.
- 2008 "Fucking Different Tel Aviv"
- 2010 "That's Gila, That's Me". Documentary.
- 2010 "Hasamba, the third generation". TV Series
