= Himmo, King of Jerusalem =

- Film poster
- Hebrew: חימו מלך ירושלים
- Directed by: Amos Guttman
- Written by: Edna Mazia
- Based on: Himmo, King of Jerusalem by Yoram Kaniuk
- Produced by: Ehud Bleiberg; Enrique Rottenberg
- Starring: Alona Kimhi; Amos Lavi
- Cinematography: Jorge Gurvich
- Edited by: Ziva Postec
- Music by: Ilan Virtzberg
- Release date: 1987
- Running time: 84 minutes
- Country: Israel
- Language: Hebrew

Himmo, King of Jerusalem (Hebrew: חימו מלך ירושלים, tr. Himmo Melech Yerushalaim) is a 1987 Israeli independent underground dramatic art film directed by Amos Guttman. It was adapted by Edna Mazia from an eponymous 1966 novel by Yoram Kaniuk,

== Plot ==
The film is set in an abandoned monastery-turned-clinic (the film was shot at the Monastery of the Cross), unfolds during the siege of Jerusalem in 1948. The protagonist is the enigmatic Himmo Perach (Ofer Shikartsi), a mortally wounded soldier and former charismatic philanderer who cannot speak (except when he asks to be shot, though nobody in the monastery has the courage to do so) or move as he had most of his limbs removed without anesthesia due to severe shortages. A young and beautiful volunteer nurse, Hamutal Horowitz (Alona Kimhi), is romantically drawn to Himmo. Jealousy amongst the other patients, all in love with Hamutal though receiving only professional care, soon begins to emerge.

== Production ==
The film, financed by the Israel Film Fund and developed at Herzliya Studios, stars inter alia Icho Avital, Mika Rottenberg, Amiram Gabriel, Yossi Graber, Shai Kapon, Amos Lavi, Dov Navon, Aliza Rosen, and Sivan Shavit and has cinematography by Jorge Gurvich, production by Enrique Rottenberg, and music by Ilan Virtzberg (in addition to the 1946/1948 song "We Left Slowly" performed by Shoshana Damari).

== Cast ==
- Icho Avital as Yoram
- Shay Capon as Aaron
- Amiram Gabriel as Frangi
- Alona Kimhi as Hamital
- Amos Lavi as Marcos
- Dov Navon as Assa
- Aliza Rosen as Clara
- Sivan Shavit as Ivria
- Yossi Graber as doctor
- Ada Valerie-Tal
- Ofer Shikartsi as Himmo
- Avi Gilor

== Reception ==
It was screened and won several prizes at the 1988 Toronto International Film Festival, San Francisco International Film Festival, Haifa International Film Festival, and 1988 Chicago International Film Festival, despite being a commercial flop with only 21,000 tickets sold.

Journalist Meir Schnitzer dismissed the film for its "lack of plot" and "visual ugliness", and similar pontifications were voiced by other journalists such as Gidi Orsher, who dismissed its "pretentiousness" and called it a stain on the Israeli film "industry", and Nachman Ingber, who called it “miserable, tiring, heavy, a boring and slow film in which nothing happens” and complained that it utilized "too much dialogue and too little action".

Outside Israel, where the film was distributed by the National Center for Jewish Film, TV Guide also dismissed the "stagy, with a fair amount of speechmaking" approach. The film was released on DVD in Israel by Third Ear DVDs as part of a boxset containing the complete filmography of Guttman and an equivalent boxset was released in France by Bach Films. Several nowadays notable Israeli film people, such as Rony Gruber, Samuel Maoz, Shva Salhoov, and Shahar Segal started out as crew bit parts on this film.

== Bibliography ==
- Meir Schnitzer. הקולנוע הישראלי: כל העובדות, כל העלילות, כל הבמאים וגם ביקורות [Israeli Cinema: All Facts, All Plots, All Directors, and All Critiques] (in Hebrew). Or Yehuda and Jerusalem: Kinneret Zmora-Bitan Dvir, Jerusalem Cinematheque's Israel Film Archive, and Ministry of Education's Israel Film Institute. 1994. pp. 20, 295, and 376. ISBN 9789652863782. OCLC 31817606.
- Himmo, King of Jerusalem. In: Kaufman, Deborah (1991). Plotkin, Janis; Orenstein, Rena (eds.). A Guide to Films Featured in the Jewish Film Festival. Berkeley, California: Jewish Film Festival. pp. 30−31. OCLC 25527469. Reprinted in: Plotkin, Janis (1996). Libresco, Caroline; Feiger, Josh (eds.). Independent Jewish Film: A Resource Guide (3rd ed.). San Francisco, California: San Francisco Jewish Film Festival. p. 71. ISBN 9780965068802. OCLC 36119531.
