= Milky (disambiguation) =

Milky may refer to:

- Milky, an Italian dance music production group
- Milky (pudding), a dairy pudding produced in Israel by the Strauss Group
- Miyuki Watanabe, a former member of multiple Japanese idol girl groups
- Milky, a 1993 single by Cell, the American band

== See also ==
- Milky Way
