= When I Close My Eyes =

When I Close My Eyes can refer to:

- "When I Close My Eyes" (Keith Palmer song), 1991, also covered by Larry Stewart (1993) and Kenny Chesney (1996)
- "When I Close My Eyes" (Shanice song), 1999
- "When I Close My Eyes", a 2012 song by Uncle Kracker from Midnight Special
- When I Close My Eyes (1995 film) or Love Letter, a Japanese film
- When I Close My Eyes (1993 film), a Slovenian film
