= Rony Gruber =

Israeli film director and screenwriter (born 1963)

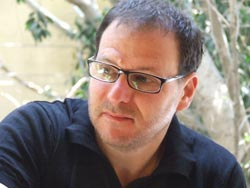
Filmmaker and scriptwriter Rony Gruber

Rony Gruber (Hebrew: רוני גרובר; born January 15, 1963) is an Israeli film director and screenwriter. He is best known as the director and co-producer of Are You This Able?, nominated for best documentary at the Ophir Award.

== Biography ==
Rony Gruber was born in Tel Aviv and graduated the Tichon Hadash high school, majoring in arts. He made his first steps in the film industry as a lighting technician. As a freshman in Tel Aviv University's Film & TV department, he joined up forces with a group of young and promising filmmakers, later to be credited for Israeli cinema renaissance. He worked as a gaffer in the student films of Arik Kaplon, Yair Lev, Shemi Zarhin and Gur Heller and with acclaimed directors Amos Guttman on Himmo, King of Jerusalem and Ze'ev Revach on Bouba.

== Film career ==
His first film was The Room (1987), a one-act drama by Harold Pinter. His second film Are You This Able? (2001) premiered in the Haifa International Film Festival and participated in film festivals around the world. Israeli critic Amir Kaminer wrote about the film: "Rony Gruber's sensitive and human documentary is sheer exhilaration. A sweet moment of victory...." Critic Nir Kipnis wrote in Globes, "The biggest achievement of the film in offering us a fresh point of view of the emotional world of the mentally disabled. The world portrayed in Are You This Able? seems so similar to our own and yet it differs elusively in the way it is manifested...."

In 2002 he collaborated with Yitzhak Ben Ner in the writing of the script for the fictional feature film Nicole's Stations, commemorating 30 years to the Yom Kippur War and based on Ben Ner's novel Rustic Sunset. The script was commissioned by the Makor Film Fund.

In 2003 Gruber directed a five-episode reality television series commissioned by Israel Broadcasting Authority. The series portrays day-to-day life at a Herods Hotel in Eilat using it as an allegory of Israeli society's hedonistic and extroverted existence. The music was written by composer Avi Benjamin.

In 2007 he directed episodes in the TV drama Room Service featuring Asi Levi, Sasha Damidov, Danny Steg, Yehezkel Lazarov and others.

Gruber's work includes two documentaries: In Golda's Shoes, a portrait of Golda Meir, and There We Sat and Wept ... in collaboration with Prof. Yossi Yona, telling the story for Iraqi Diaspora longing to Iraqi Jews driven out of Baghdad in the 1940.

== Other ==
Rony Gruber served three terms (2007–2010) as a board member at AIDF (Association of Israeli Documentary Filmmakers) and wrote its articles of association. He has been invited to be a member of the Readers Committee at The Israel Film Fund and the Makor Film Fund. Through the years he has been teaching cinema, among others, in Ma'ale Film School, Kinneret Academic College and Habetzefer.

In 2001 he was awarded the Akim Excellence Award presented annually by the president of Israel.
