= Yitzhak Ben Ner =

Israeli writer, screenwriter, journalist, film critic and broadcast media host

- יצחק בן נר
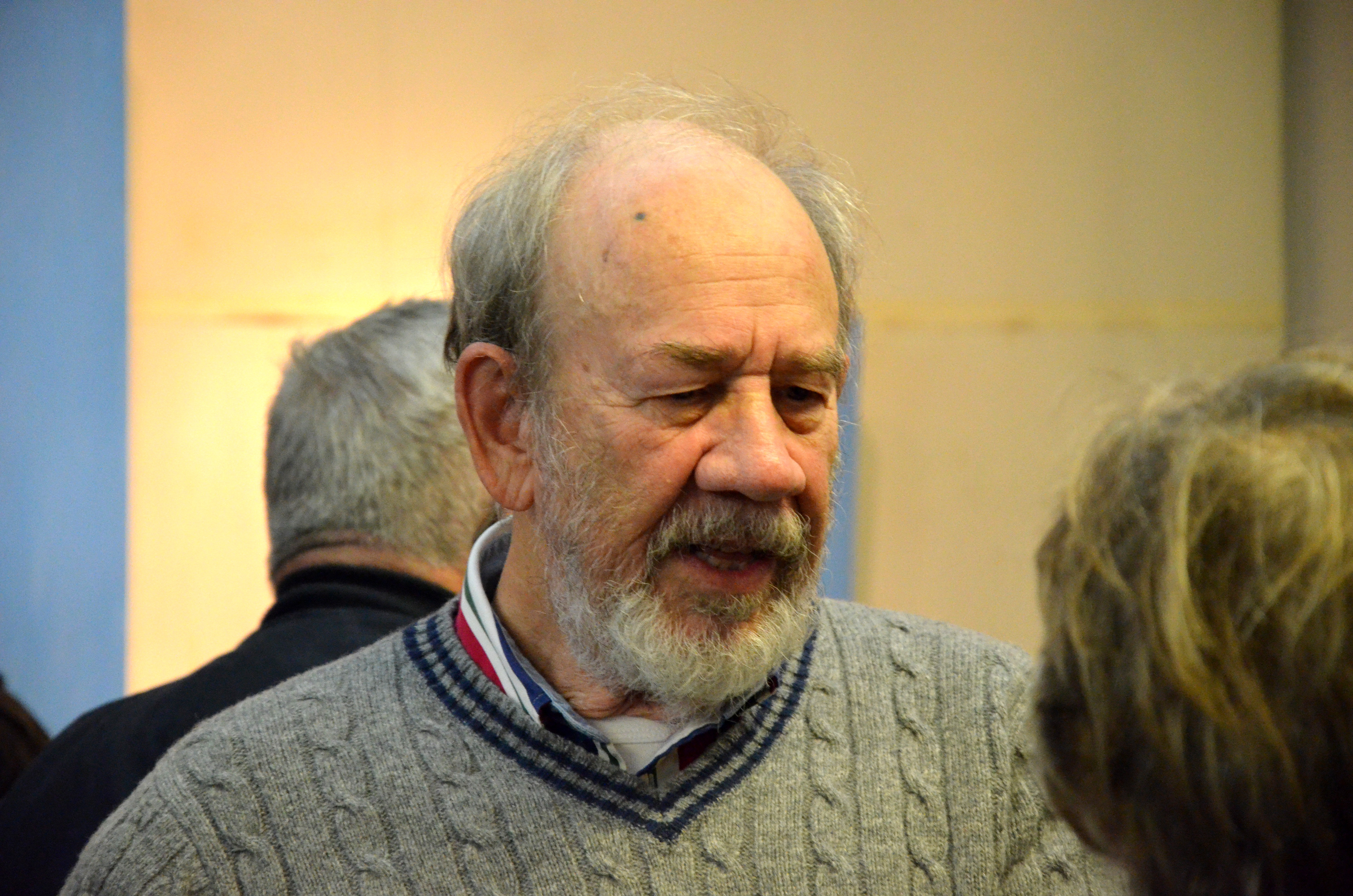
- Yitzhak Ben Ner in 2013.
- Born: July 3, 1937 (age 89); Kfar Yehoshua
- Education: Tel Aviv University
- Occupations: Writer, journalist, film critic

Yitzhak Ben Ner (Hebrew: יצחק בן נר, also transliterated Itzhak Ben-Ner; born July 3, 1937) is an Israeli writer, screenwriter, journalist, and film critic. He has also hosted and edited radio and TV programs.

== Biography ==
Ben Ner was born in 1937 in Kfar Yehoshua, Israel

He attended Tel Aviv University where he studied literature and drama. He started publishing as a boy, and published his first book for adults in 1967. Several books of his have been adapted for theatrical or cinematic productions.

His books and stories have been translated into many languages.

== Awards ==
- In 1981, Be'er was awarded the Bernstein Prize (original Hebrew novel category).
- In 1981, he was awarded the Agnon-Jerusalem Prize
- In 1983, he received the Ramat Gan Prize for Literature.
- His play Ta'atuon won First Prize at the 1990 Theatronetto Festival.
- In 2005, he was awarded Prime Minister's Prize.

== Works ==
=== Books ===
- After the Field-Burner (children), 1967
- The Man From There (novel), 1967
- Rustic Sunset (story collection), 1976
- Kishona, Children of the River (children), 1977
- After the Rain (3 stories), 1979
- My Friend Emmanuel and I (children), 1979
- A Far Land (novel in stories), 1981
- Protokol (novel), 1982
- Angels are Coming (novel), 1987
- Ta'atuon (novel), 1989
- Jeans, a Dog (children), 1991
- Morning of Fools (novel), 1992
- Bears and Woods (novel), 1995
- Enemy Scope (novel), 1997
- City of Refuge (novel), 2000
- Nobody's Ever Died Walking (novel), 2007

=== Film and television ===
- Again, Forever (feature film, wrote story and screenplay), 1985
- Atalia (feature film, wrote story), 1986
- The Class Queen (feature film, as actor) 1988
- Winter Games (TV drama, wrote story) 1989
- Nili (documentary feature film, wrote screenplay and directed), 1996
- Enemy Scope, (TV mini-series, screenplay based on his novel), 1999
- "Nicole's Stations" (wrote screenplay. Based on his novel Rustic Sunset. Co-writer: Rony Gruber), 2001

=== Plays ===
- David August (monodrama, based on his story), 1983
- Ta'atuon (monodrama, based on his novel)
- A Far Land (monodrama, based on his story), 1992
- Morning of Fools (monodrama, based on his novel)
- Uri Muri (drama), 1999
