= The Galilee Eskimos =

- Film poster
- אסקימוסים בגליל
- Directed by: Jonathan Paz
- Written by: Jonathan Paz, Joshua Sobol
- Produced by: Jonathan Paz
- Starring: Germaine Unikovsky; Mosko Alkalai; Dina Doron
- Cinematography: Avi Koren
- Edited by: Shimon Spektor
- Music by: Uri Ophir
- Distributed by: Rakevet HaEmek
- Release dates: 12 September 2006 (Haifa International Film Festival); 8 February 2007 (Israel); 27 August 2007 (Canada)
- Running time: 95 minutes
- Country: Israel
- Language: Hebrew
- Budget: $650,000 (estimated)

The Galilee Eskimos (Hebrew: אסקימוסים בגליל) is a 2006 comedy-drama film directed, produced and co-written by Jonathan Paz, based on a screenplay by Yehoshua Sobol.

The plot revolves around the demise of an old and isolated kibbutz in Galilee, which falls into heavy debt, is declared bankrupt, and abandoned overnight by its members. Twelve elderly kibbutz members are left behind to fend for themselves in the kibbutz's retirement home, akin to elderly Eskimos being abandoned to die.

The film was shot at Kibbutz Yehiam and premiered at the Haifa International Film Festival in September 2006. It participated in the Toronto International Film Festival and the Montreal World Film Festival.

== Plot ==
When the bank forecloses on the property of an isolated and financially troubled kibbutz in Galilee, Israel, most of the residents gather their belongings and abandon the community before the bailiffs arrive. In their haste to depart, however, they neglect to bring a dozen senior citizens who are now forced to fend for themselves as they attempt to oppose the construction of a luxury spa and casino and save their kibbutz single-handedly. In the process, they rediscover the pioneering spirit they felt when the kibbutz was first established.

== Cast ==
- Germaine Unikovsky as Durkeh
- Mosko Alkalai as Mundek
- Dina Doron as Fanny
- Hugo Yarden as Reznik
- Shimon Yisraeli as Yulek
- Ruth Sagall as Chesha
- Gabi Amrani as Yoske
- Levana Finkelstein as Miraleh
- Hana Rot as Faigeh
- Shmuel Shilo as Faybel
- Leah Shlanger as Nyeshka
- Ilan Toren as Berkeh
- Dvir Benedek as Spielman
- Adi Gilat as Limor
- Ofer Zohar as Azulay

== Production ==
Director Jonathan Paz grew up on Kibbutz Mizra in northern Israel, where he was a member until 1971. In a 2009 interview, Paz stated: “The idea for the film came to me some seven years ago, in the final year of my dear mother's life. On one of my visits to the kibbutz (which, incidentally, treated her and her contemporaries in a wonderful way, as do, to the best of my knowledge, all of the other kibbutzim), we spoke of Globalization, insensitive Capitalism and the poor state of the kibbutzim. Many of the kibbutzim had begun the process of Privatization (no more Communal Living or ‘Each contributes according to his abilities and receives according to his needs’… no more equality and cooperation, only ‘Differential Wages’ etc.). I spoke to my mother about loneliness and the fact that life passes so quickly (even though my mother lived to the ripe old-age of 97, alert and lucid to the end). I asked her, ‘Mother, which period of your life do you miss the most?’ She answered without any hesitation, 'I would like to go back to the time when we founded the kibbutz.’ I knew right then that I had a story! There was a film to be made!”

The Galilee Eskimos pays tribute to the founding generation of kibbutzniks and Paz's respect for the egalitarian values and mutual help their lives embodied. In the same 2009 interview, Paz emphasized that "I made my film with a great deal of love, nostalgia, longing and homage to those people who founded the kibbutz. I really admire and love those people."
