= Urban Feel =

- Directed by: Jonathan Sagall
- Written by: Jonathan Sagall
- Starring: Dafna Rechter
- Cinematography: Dror Moreh
- Release date: 1998
- Running time: 103 minutes
- Country: Israel
- Language: Hebrew

Urban Feel (Hebrew: Kesher Ir) is an Israeli film released in 1998. It tells the story of Eva and Robbie (played by Dafna Rechter and Sharon Alexander), a young Tel Aviv couple in a troubled marriage, which is rocked by the return of Emmanuel - played by Jonathan Sagall - Eva's charming and mischievous ex-boyfriend.

The film won Best Feature Film at the 1998 Haifa International Film Festival, and was nominated for twelve Israeli Academy Awards, winning two. It was also entered into the 49th Berlin International Film Festival.

== Plot ==
Eva is trapped in an unhappy marriage to Ruby and is a mother to their child. She works in a store and suffers from unpaid wages.

Her marriage deteriorates further with the return of Emmanuel, Eva's former lover, and Ruby's former classmate.

== Cast ==
Actor Name	Character Name
Dafna Rechter	Eva
Jonathan Sagall	Emanuel
Shimon Ben-Ari	Marco
Tchia Danon	Gabriela
Ziv Baruch	Jonah
Zachi Dichner	Police officer
