= Rivka Michaeli =

Israeli actress

- רבקה מיכאלי
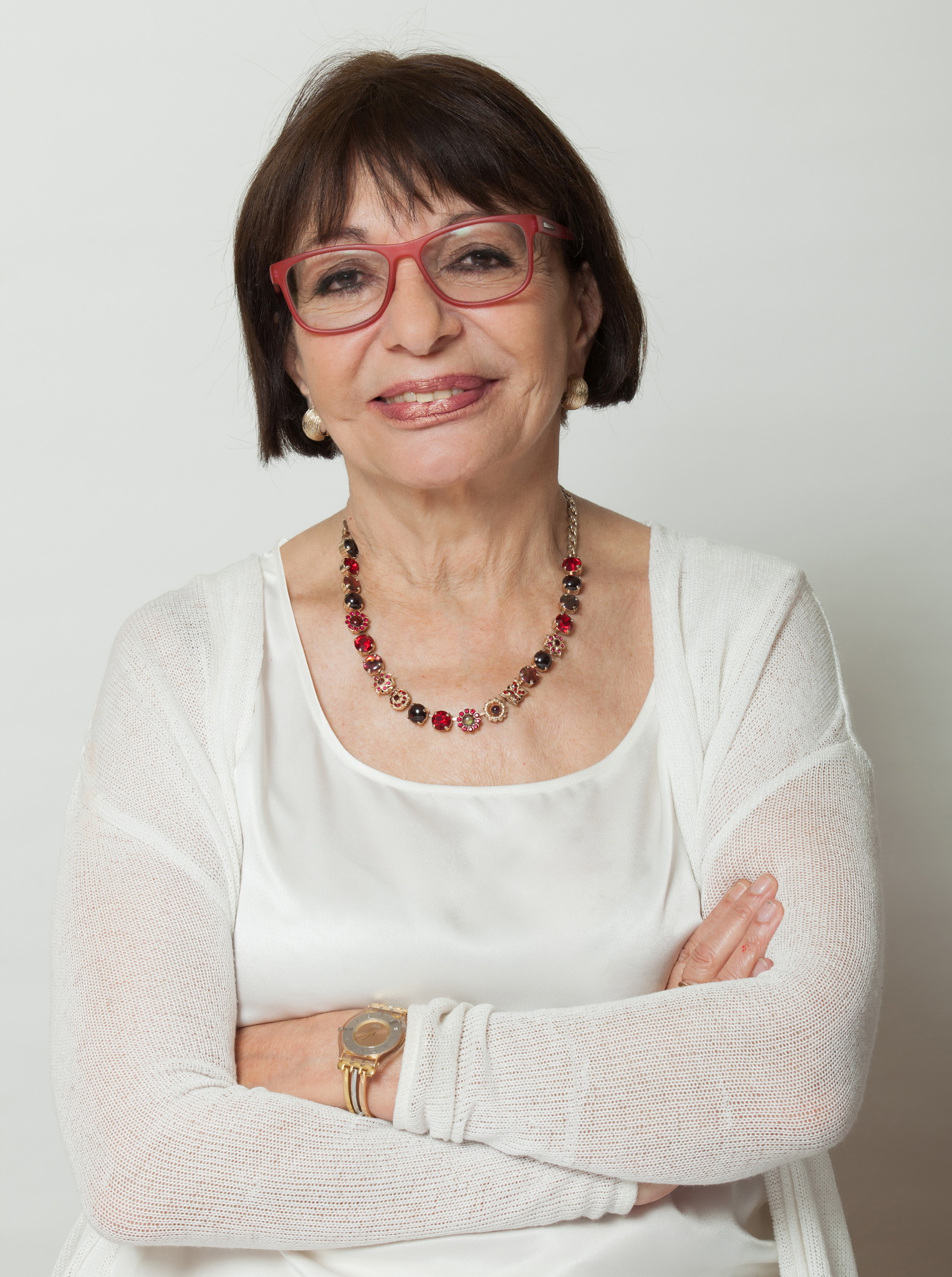
- Michaeli in 2016
- Born: 14 April 1938 (age 88); Jerusalem, Mandatory Palestine
- Occupations: Actress; comedian; television presenter
- Years active: 1952–present

Rivka Michaeli (Hebrew: רבקה מיכאלי; born 14 April 1938) is an Israeli actress, comedian and television presenter.

== Early life ==
Michaeli was born in Jerusalem, British Mandate of Palestine (now Israel). Her father's family is of Georgian-Jewish descent, whereas her mother comes from the Rivlin family and is of Austrian-Jewish descent. Michaeli attended the Hebrew University Secondary School.

== Career ==
By age 14, she was singing on Israel Radio. Michaeli performed her military service at the Army Radio.

In the 1960s, her first show on stage was with Yossi Banai. She met future composer and Israel Prize recipient Ehud Manor in the 1960s, when she was emceeing the dance troupe of The Hebrew University of Jerusalem, and he applied to join the troupe. Impressed by his musical knowledge, she contacted Israel Radio, which offered him a job editing musical programs, and ultimately accepted a number of songs he produced for broadcast.

In 1974 she was part of the cast of the satirical program Nikui Rosh ("Head Cleaning"). Subsequently, she was the host of Siba L'mesiba ("Reason for a Party"), the most popular television program broadcast on Friday evenings, as well as its successor, "Sof Shavua" ("Weekend").

She also performed at the Habimah and Cameri theaters, acted in a television series, and appeared in 16 films, broadcast on radio, recorded albums, moderated song festivals, and twice hosted Eurovision.

In 1991, The Los Angeles Times called her "one of Israel's most popular television hosts", and in 1995 The Jerusalem Post called her "one of the country's most popular entertainers".

In 1992, she won praise for her performance in Amos Guttman's AIDS drama film, Amazing Grace.

Michaeli speaks Yiddish fluently and has performed in stage productions for Yiddishpiel, a Yiddish theatre in Tel Aviv. In 2024, she had a Yiddish-language role in the Antwerp-set television series Kugel, a prequel to Shtisel.

== Awards and recognitiion ==
- 2001 Golden Screen Award for lifetime achievement
- 2005: Ophir Award for best supporting actress in Joy by Julie Shles.
- 2008: Award of the Israeli Television Academy for lifetime achievement
- 2009: Lifetime Achievement Award for her contribution to Israeli radio
- 2011: Ben-Gurion University honorary doctorate " "in recognition of an esteemed artist and wonderful comedian, who with her brilliant talent and stage presence has left her mark on Israeli culture in a variety of fields; in recognition of the value of one of the pillars of the entertainment sector in Israel..."
- 2018: Television Academy Award - Best Actress in a Children's and Youth Series for Elisha (TV series)

== Personal life ==
In 1967, Michaeli married Yoram Liebovich, an insurance man, and in 1979 they divorced. They have a daughter and son who live in the United States. After several years, Michaeli got married again to Reuven Sharoni, also an insurance man. After 16 years they separated, but later resumed living together and were married until Sharoni's death in 2023.

Michaeli lives in Tel Aviv.

Michaeli is a member of the public council of the organization B'Tselem.
