= The Felons =

1987 film

- Directed by: Franci Slak
- Written by: Jože Dolmark; Marjan Rožanc; Franci Slak
- Starring: Mario Selih
- Cinematography: Boris Turković
- Edited by: Vuksan Lukovac
- Release date: 28 October 1987
- Running time: 90 minutes
- Country: Yugoslavia
- Language: Slovene

The Felons (Slovene: Hudodelci) is a 1987 Yugoslavian drama film directed by Franci Slak. It was entered into the 38th Berlin International Film Festival.

== Cast ==
- Mario Šelih as Peter Bordon
- Anja Rupel as Štefka
- Bata Živojinović as Preiskovalni
- Rade Šerbedžija as Raka
- Elizabeth Spender as Florence
- Boris Bakal as Uradnik Jovanovič
- Zijah Sokolović as Moše
