= Canary Season =

1993 film

- Directed by: Evgeni Mihailov
- Written by: Nikolai Valchinov
- Starring: Paraskeva Djukelova
- Release date: 26 November 1993
- Running time: 128 minutes
- Country: Bulgaria
- Language: Bulgarian

Canary Season (Bulgarian: Sezonat na kanarchetata) is a 1993 Bulgarian drama film directed by Evgeni Mihailov. The film was selected as the Bulgarian entry for the Best Foreign Language Film at the 66th Academy Awards, but was not accepted as a nominee.

== Cast ==
- Paraskeva Djukelova as Young Lily
- Plamena Getova as Old Lily
- Mikhael Dontchev as Malin
- Petar Popyordanov as Ivan, Father of Malin
- Michail Alexandrov as Yoyng Malin
- Ani Vulchanova as Margarita
- Plamen Serakov as Tanasi

== See also ==
- List of submissions to the 66th Academy Awards for Best Foreign Language Film
- List of Bulgarian submissions for the Academy Award for Best Foreign Language Film
