= Revenge of Itzik Finkelstein =

- Film poster
- Directed by: Enrique Rottenberg
- Release date: 1993
- Running time: 83 minutes
- Country: Israel
- Language: Hebrew

Revenge of Itzik Finkelstein (translit. Nikmato Shel Itzik Finkelstein) is a 1993 Israeli fantasy comedy film directed by Enrique Rottenberg. It stars Moshe Ivgy, Estevan Gotfreed, Dvora Halter-Keidar and Shmil Ben Ari. Critically acclaimed, it won the Ophir Award for Best Film. The film was selected as the Israeli entry for the Best Foreign Language Film at the 66th Academy Awards, but was not accepted as a nominee.

== Plot ==
The plot follows Itzik Finkelstein (Moshe Ivgi), a single 40 year old man who didn't achieve much in his life and lives with his mother. His only attempt to succeed comes when he imports tens of thousands of keychains in the shape of a monk whose genitals are revealed by pressing his head. After the failure of the business, Itzik discovered the magnitude of his failure and the loss of the meaning of his life. One night, the keychain becomes an imaginary monk (Esteban Gottfried). The monk turns out to be a messenger of revenge who explains that Itzik's situation is caused not by his own actions but by the people who lied to him and set his ways for him. With the help of the monk, Finkelstein embarks on a journey of revenge against the people responsible for his failure.

== See also ==
- List of submissions to the 66th Academy Awards for Best Foreign Language Film
- List of Israeli submissions for the Academy Award for Best Foreign Language Film
