= Ruth Sagall =

Israeli actress (1929–2021)

- רות סגל
- Born: 9 June 1929; Katowice, Second Polish Republic
- Died: 7 August 2021 (aged 92); Haifa, Israel
- Occupation: Actress
- Years active: 1962–2008
- Children: 2, including Jonathan Sagall

Ruth Sagall (Hebrew: רות סגל; 9 June 1929 – 7 August 2021) was a Polish-born Israeli actress of stage, screen and television. She was a member of the Haifa Theatre after joining it in 1962 and played a lead role in some of the plays staged in the theatre. Sagall also played solo in the plays The Woman Destroyed, Available for Proposals and Leah Goes Out on the Street as well as being cast in roles in films and a television programme. In 2002, Sagall authored the book, Goya with Freckles, in which she discusses how she survived the Holocaust.

== Early life ==
On 9 June 1929, Sagall was born in Katowice, Poland. At age five, she won first prize in a young talent contest, She was able to survive the Holocaust by disguising herself as a Christian Polish girl. Sagall emigrated to Israel in 1946, when she was 17 years old. She attended Ayanot Agricultural School. In 1956, she began studying acting at the Strandale Bennett Theater School in Toronto, Canada.

== Career ==
In 1962, Sagall moved back to Israel, and she was accepted as a member of the Haifa Theatre in the same year. Some of the roles she portrayed were those where she was a member of the lead cast, such as Eliza Doolittle in Pygmalion by George Bernard Shaw. Sagall also played Maria in Anton Chekhov's Three Sisters, Ranevskaya in The Cherry Orchard also by Chekhov, the nanny in The Father by August Strindberg and Gogan in The Plough and the Stars by Seán O'Casey under the direction of Oded Kotler. She also starred solo in the plays The Woman Destroyed by Simone de Beauvoir in 1981, Available for Proposals five years that was authored for her by Arie Yas and Leah Goes Out on the Street in 1992.

Sagall was the director of the children's plays Winnie-the-Pooh that was adopted from the A. A. Milne books in 1981 as well as The Cute Monster adapted from the writer Oded Burla. She wrote a play, Flowers for the Feast, but it was never brought to the stage. Sagall was in the 1967 film Women in the Other Room and played Tzipa-Leah in Behind the Fence seven years later. In 1977, she was cast in the role of lead in the film Doda Clara directed by Avraham Heffner. That same year, she played Gloska in Fantasy on a Romantic Theme. Sagall went on to feature in On the Fringe and as Chives in Baba-It both in 1987. She portrayed the part of Leah in the 1990 film Parents and Sons, Fence in the television series Itche in 1997, the groom in Urban Feel a year later, Chesha in the 2006 film The Galilee Eskimos and played Friedel in the 2008 film Valentina's Mother. In 2002, she authored the book, Goya with Freckles, which was published by Am Oved. In it, Sagall discussed how she survived the Holocaust.

== Personal life ==
She was married. Sagall is the mother of the actor and screenwriter Jonathan Sagall, and she also had a daughter. On the evening of 7 August 2021, she died in Haifa. Sagall's funeral took place at Haifa Cemetery in Tamar gate on the following day's evening.

== Awards ==
In 1979, she received the Margalit Award for Outstanding Actress for her performance in The Plough and the Stars and the Actress of the Year Award for the role in Fantasy on a Romantic Theme the following year. Sagall was awarded the Civic Award for the City of Haifa for "her many years of contribution to the cultural life of Haifa and the entire country."
