= Yahav Winner =

Israeli filmmaker (1986–2023)

- יהב וינר
- Born: 4 June 1986; Israel
- Died: 7 October 2023 (aged 37); Kfar Aza, Israel
- Citizenship: Israeli
- Occupation: Director

Yahav Winner (Hebrew: יהב וינר; 4 June 1986 – 7 October 2023) was an Israeli filmmaker, actor, producer and cinematographer. He was murdered in the Kfar Aza massacre, part of the October 7 Hamas-led attack during the Gaza war.

== Life and career ==
Winner graduated from the Nissan Nativ Acting Studio in 2014. He was also a graduate of the film department at Minshar School of Art.

Between 2014 and 2018 he was an actor in theatre (Habima and Kibbutz theatre) and in television. His short film Faith won the best students' film at the 2020 Solidarity Human Rights Film Festival, as well as best screenplay at the Little Wing Film Festival.

His short film Neurim was screened at Cinefondation in Cannes and at the Palm Springs Shortfest. His last film, The Boy, focused on a father and son from a kibbutz near the Gaza Strip facing incoming rocket fire and nearby combat, won the best cinematography prize at the 2023 Tel Aviv International Students Film Festival. Posthumously, The Boy and Winner won the best screenplay and Prix Interculturel awards at the 2023 Filmschoolfest Munich.

Winner worked at the Film and Television School of Sapir College as head of productions.

At the time of his death, he had completed filming and began editing of his first feature-length film, which he directed, wrote and also acted in. The film was made at Kfar Aza with Winner as director and many fellow local residents appearing as actors alongside him, many of whom were murdered with him in the events of 7 October. In November 2023, the completed film, The Boy, began screening nationally at Israeli cinemas with proceeds dedicated to his widow and child. It also premiered internationally in various film festivals.

== Personal life ==
Winner was married to Shaylee Atary, an actor and singer. They had a daughter together, born in September 2023.

== Death ==
Winner was murdered at his home during the 7 October attacks as part of the Kfar Aza massacre by Hamas militants. He was 37. His wife reported that he had attempted to lock the door to the house to protect his family and was closing the iron gate on their safe room over the hand of a terrorist who was reaching in at the last moment she saw him. His wife, Shaylee Atary Winner (sometimes spelled ShayLee Atari) and one-month-old baby Shaya (or Shia) hid for more than 24 hours before being rescued.

Winner was initially considered missing and his body was identified on 11 October. It was later disclosed that he had been killed by a single shot to his head while stalling the militants.

His wife was one of a number of widows who wished to continue their husbands' legacy by birthing a child via posthumous sperm retrieval (PSR) and artificial insemination or in vitro fertilization. However, Winner's body had been lying in the heat unidentified for too long for doctors to be able to retrieve viable sperm, which should be retrieved within 12 to 24 hours after death to maximize the likelihood of success; the procedure can be done in Israel at the request of a surviving wife and the completion of necessary documentation. The scope of the numbers of deaths following the Hamas attacks led to a significant increase in the number of PSR requests. Winner's wife expressed her disappointment at the bureaucratic obstacles and demand for payment that she faced, along with her regret that the delays in retrieving his sperm would mean that she would never be able to have additional children with him. Their case is documented in an ethics study of the matter in wartime.

== Filmography ==
- The Boy (2023, Hebrew title: הילד) - Writer, director and producer
- Single Light (2023, Hebrew title: אור פנס יחיד) - Casting
- Happiness and Rejoicing (2022) - Cinematographer
- Indian Grave (2021, Hebrew title: קבר אינדיאני) - Director, writer and actor
- Deep Breaths (2020, Hebrew title: שלוש נשימות עמוקות)
- Neurim (2020, Hebrew title: נעורים) - Producer
- Night Out (2019, Hebrew title: יציאה) - Actor
- Faith (2019) - Writer and director
- The Day After I'm Gone (2019, Hebrew title: היום שאחרי לכתי) - Actor
- Little Earthquakes (2016, Hebrew title: רעידות אדמה קטנות) - Actor
- The Eulogy of Pini Gurevich (2015, Hebrew title: ההספד של פיני גורביץ) - Actor
- Capricious Manifest (2014, Hebrew title: מניפסט קפריזי) - Actor
- The Plan (2012) - Actor

== See also ==
- Casualties of the Gaza war
- List of Israeli actors
