= Aharon Meskin =

Israeli actor (1898–1974)

- אהרן מסקין
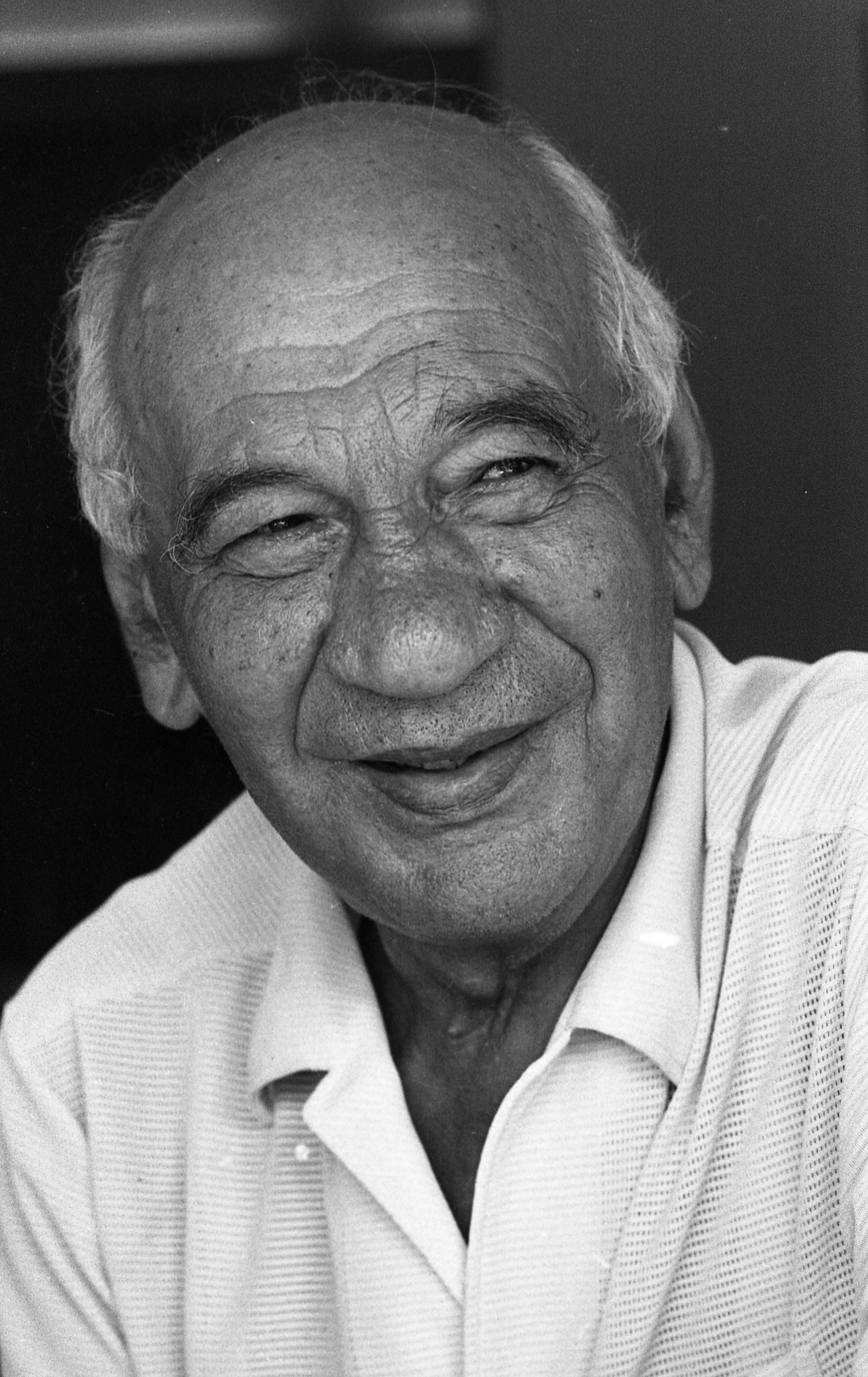
- Meskin in 1969
- Born: 22 March 1898; Shumyachi, Mogilev Governorate, Russian Empire
- Died: 11 November 1974 (aged 76); Tel Aviv, Israel
- Occupation: Actor
- Known for: Leading roles in Hebrew theatre
- Children: Amnon; Yuval
- Awards: Israel Prize (1960)

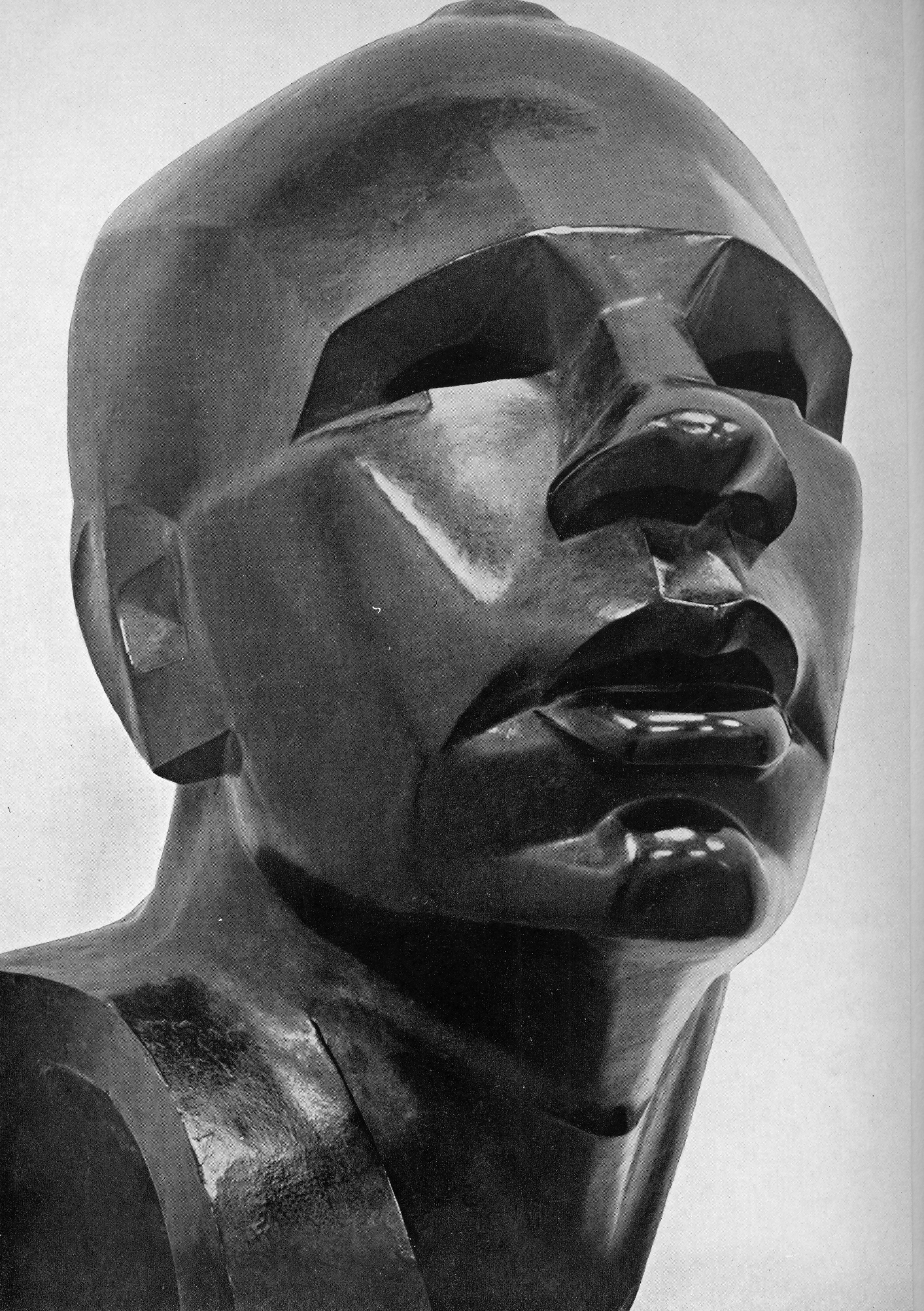
Sculpture of Aharon Meskin by Zeev Ben-Zvi

Aharon Meskin (Hebrew: אהרן מסקין; 22 March 1898 – 11 November 1974) was an Israeli actor.

== Biography ==
Aharon Meskin was born in 1898 in Shumyachi in the Mogilev Governorate of the Russian Empire. His parents were Moshe Meskin and Rashel Chasanov. Following the Russian Revolution, Maskin joined the Red Army, in which he became an officer and, in 1919, was responsible for the distribution of food to the residents of Moscow. During this period, he met members of recently founded Habima Theatre in Moscow and provided them with food.

He joined Habima Theatre in 1922, and appeared in its production of the play, The Dybbuk by S. Ansky.

In 1928, he immigrated to Mandate Palestine. In his personal life, he had two sons. His eldest son Amnon was an actor, and his youngest son Yuval works for Kol Yisrael.

During his career on the Hebrew stage, Meskin played many leading roles, including Othello; the Golem; Shylock (in The Merchant of Venice); Willy Loman in Death of a Salesman; the black pastor Stephen Kumalo in Cry, The Beloved Country; Captain Queeg in The Caine Mutiny and many others. His final performance was in Nisim Aloni's The Gypsies of Jaffa, produced in 1971.

== Awards and recognition ==
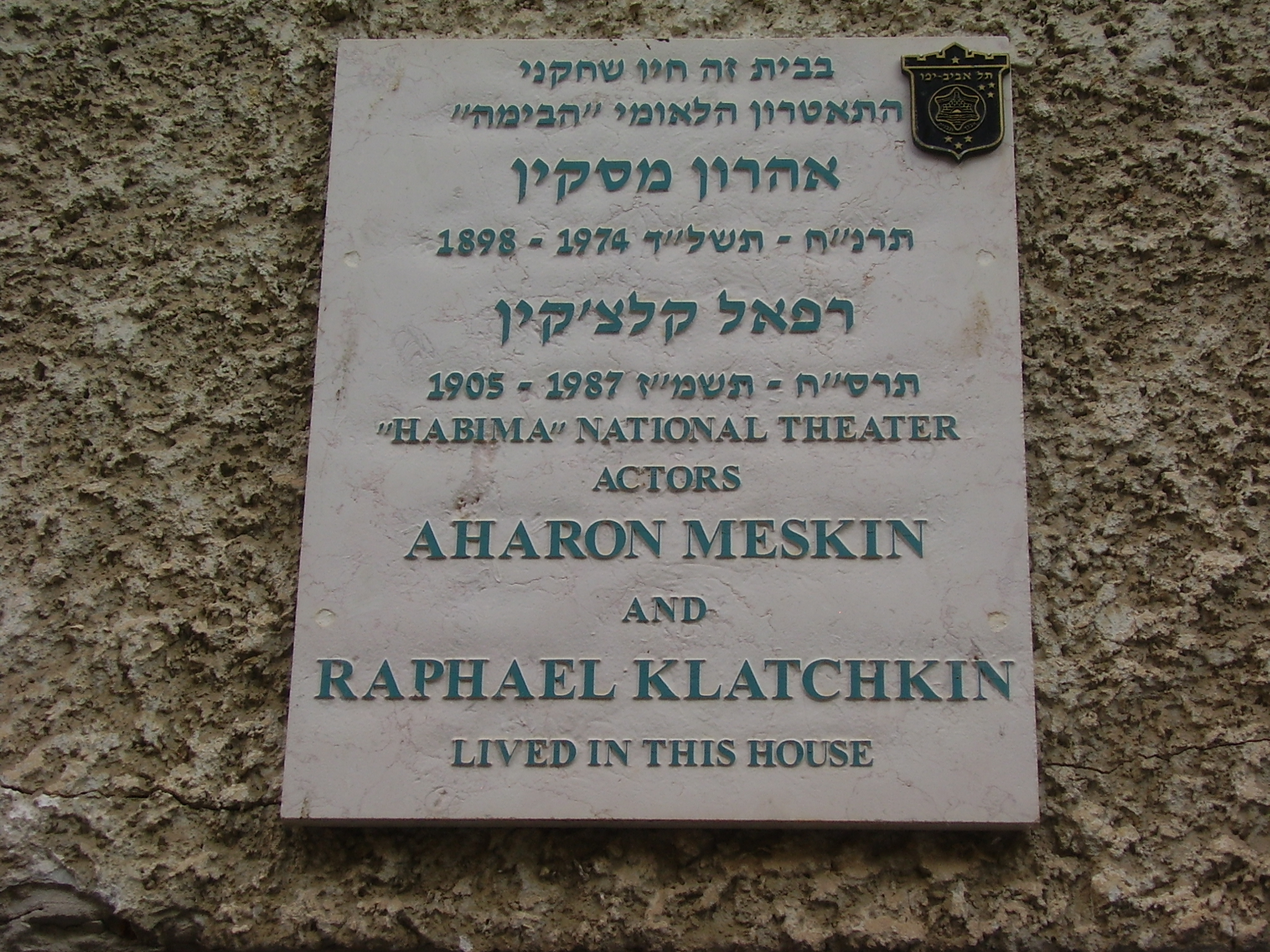
Memorial plaque marking Meskin's home in Tel Aviv

- In 1960, Meskin was awarded the Israel Prize, in theatre.

== See also ==
- Culture of Israel
- List of Israel Prize recipients
- List of Israeli actors
