= Ada Valerie-Tal =

Israeli actress (1936–1994)

- עדה ואלרי טל
- Born: 15 August 1936; Bucharest, Romania
- Died: 14 October 1994 (aged 58); Tel Aviv, Israel
- Occupation: Actress
- Years active: 1984–1994

Ada Valerie-Tal (Hebrew: עדה ואלרי טל; 15 August 1936 – 14 October 1994) was a Romanian-born Israeli actress. She was considered to be one of Israel's earliest transgender stars. Her most notable appearances were in films directed by Amos Guttman, including Bar 51 (1986), Himmo, King of Jerusalem (1987) and Amazing Grace (1992).

She chose her name as she was inspired by the Ukrainian-born Israeli stage actress, Ada Tal.

== Early life ==
Valerie-Tal was born and raised in Bucharest in Romania. She made Aliyah to Israel at the age of 28.

== Career ==
She worked at the storied Bar 51 in Tel Aviv as a hostess and exotic dancer under the stage name "Lola". One evening, she met a patron, director, Amos Guttman, who saw her potential, despite her lack of training as an actress. Guttman cast her as Apollonia, one of the main characters in his second film, Bar 51 (1986). She won praise for her performance in the film and was awarded honorary membership of the Israeli Artists' Association.

She was reunited with Guttman when he cast her in his subsequent films, Himmo, King of Jerusalem (1987) and Amazing Grace (1992). She also appeared in student films and in theatre productions. She played Ophelia at Hasimta Theater in Jaffa.

== Personal life ==
Valerie-Tal underwent gender reassignment surgery in 1970 at Tel Hashomer Hospital, one of the first Israelis to undergo the surgery in the country.

She later had a short-lived marriage to a dentist, which ended in divorce.

She lived in a small apartment on Ben Yehuda Street in Tel Aviv.

== Death ==
On 14 October 1994, Valerie-Tal died of heart disease in Tel Aviv at the age of 58. Details of her transgender identity only became known to the Israeli public after her death.

She was buried at Yarkon Cemetery.
