= Sendi Bar =

Israeli actress and model

Sandi Bar סנדי בר
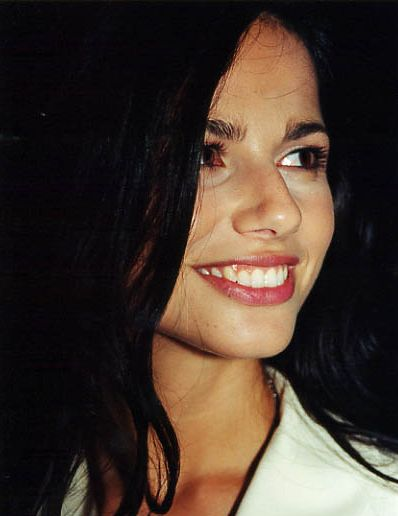
- Born: Sandi Baranes; April 5, 1976 (age 50); Tel Aviv, Israel
- Spouse: Aki Avni (2001–2008)
- Children: 1

Sandi Bar (sometimes Sendy Bar; Hebrew: סנדי בר; born April 5, 1976) is an Israeli actress and model.

Sandi Baranes (סנדי ברנס) was born in Tel Aviv, Israel. Her father is a Libyan Jew, whereas her mother is Israeli-born and of Moroccan Jewish descent.

== Career ==
Bar started her modelling career at 17, featuring in commercials for Black and Wild beer, Milki and Isracart. She modelled for fashion companies Castro and Pilpel.

Bar started her acting career in 1996 in the TV drama Deadly Fortune, directed by Eran Riklis. It was broadcast on prime time in Channel and was followed by roles in Zbeng!, Zinzana, and Prisoners of War.

In 2022, Bar competed in the 8th season of Israel's Rokdim Im Kokhavim ('Dancing with the Stars'), where she was eliminated 8th (out of 15 couples).

== Personal life ==
Bar married Israeli actor Aki Avni in 2000. Bar and Avni resided in Los Angeles for several years. Their son was born in 2004 in the USA. The couple returned to Israel in 2008. They separated the same year, eventually getting a divorce.
