= Amazing Grace (1992 film) =

- Original poster in Hebrew
- חסד מופלא
- Directed by: Amos Guttman
- Written by: Amos Guttman
- Produced by: Dagan Price
- Starring: Gal Hoyberger; Sharon Alexander; Aki Avni; Rivka Michaeli; Karin Ophir
- Cinematography: Yoav Kosh, Amnon Zlayet
- Edited by: Einat Glaser-Zarhin
- Music by: Arkadi Duchin
- Release date: October 1992
- Running time: 90 minutes
- Country: Israel
- Language: Hebrew

Amazing Grace (Hebrew: חסד מופלא) is a 1992 Israeli film directed by Amos Guttman. The plot includes elements of Guttman's own biography; it was his last film before he died of AIDS.

== Plot ==
Jonathan is an innocent young man who lives in Tel Aviv and works as a supervisor at the children's home run by his mother, after leaving his family home in the Moshav. He lives in a rented apartment and has to occasionally watch over his younger sister, a mischievous girl who hangs out with young Arabs. His lover Miki, the soldier for whom Jonathan moved to Tel Aviv, is not loyal to him and is not really interested in a stable and permanent relationship.

Later, Jonathan meets Thomas, a man with AIDS who lives in New York and came to visit Israel, where his mother and grandmother live in Jonathan's building. Jonathan falls in love with Thomas and wants to spend his time with him. Thomas's mother is an introverted seamstress who lives with her mother, a grumpy and cynical old woman who often teases her daughter. A short romance develops between Jonathan and Thomas that is not fully realized, in light of Thomas' continued resistance, who hides his terminal illness from those around him and is afraid of hurting the young Jonathan. Finally, Thomas returns to New York and leaves Jonathan with great hope of seeing him again, but knowing that this will most likely not come true. Thomas died in New York several years later.

== Cast ==
- Sharon Alexander as Thomas
- Gal Hoyberger as Jonathan
- Aki Avni as Miki, Jonathan's roommate
- Devorah Bertonov as Thomas' Grandmother's friend
- Rivka Michaeli as Yehudit, Thomas' mother
- Ishai Golan as Doron
- Bar Refaeli as Kindergarten child
- Hinna Rozovska as Thomas' Grandmother
- Dov Navon as Barman
- Ada Valerie-Tal as Neighbour
- Karin Ophir as Jonathan's little sister
- Iggy Vaxman as Bafi

== Production ==
The film was originally envisaged as 50 minutes long, but then Guttman decided to shoot a full-length feature film instead. After he finished writing the script, he applied to various funds, including the Israel Cinema Fund, but was refused and for about a year he tried to raise the budget. Finally, a private investor who was a fan of his previous films financed the film.

In October 1991, the casting of the film was completed and the filming of the film began at the end of November 1991, with a budget of approximately one hundred thousand dollars, after a small grant was also received from the Rabinovich Foundation and Tel Aviv-Yafo Municipality. The shooting of the film lasted about a month, but went over budget leaving no room for post-production edits. In April 1992, the Cinema Fund agreed to give the film a financial grant that enabled the completion of its production. To take on the role, actor Sharon Alexander took an AIDS test.

== Release ==
The film premiered at several film festivals around the world, including: the 43rd Berlin International Film Festival, Jerusalem Film Festival 1992, Torino Film Festival 1992, Lovers: Torino GLBT Film Festival 1993, Cinema Jove – Valencia International Film Festival 1992, International Film Festival Rotterdam 1992, Chicago International Film Festival 1992, Frameline Film Festival 1992 and Bogotá Film Festival 1994.

In 2023, the film was restored and received a special screening at the Jerusalem Film Festival, attended by most of the original cast. It also received a special screening at the Barbican Centre in London. It received an online screening at Toronto Jewish Film Festival in June 2024. In accompaniment to Taboo, a documentary about Guttman, that also features clips from Amazing Grace.

== Reception ==
The film won Best Feature (Wolgin Award) at the Jerusalem Film Festival and Best Film award at the Haifa International Film Festival. It was also nominated for thirteen award from the Israeli Film Academy. In 2018, Liel Leibovitz included the film in his list of "The Seven Quintessentially Israeli Movies" in a column for Tablet. Gali Gold, Head of Cinema at the Barbican Centre praised the film as "revolutionary" upon its restoration European premiere in 2023.

=== Awards and nominations ===
Wins

- Best Feature (Wolgin Award) - Jerusalem Film Festival, 1992
- Best Film - Haifa International Film Festival, 1992
- Special Attribute Award - Torino Film Festival, 1992
- Best Feature Film - Lovers: Torino GLBT Film Festival, 1992
- Silver Award for Foreign Feature - Cinema Jove – Valencia International Film Festival, 1992

Nominations

- Best Feature (Gold Hugo) - Chicago International Film Festival, 1992
- Best Director and 12 other nominations - Israeli Film Academy, 1992
- Best Film - Bogota Film Festival, 1994
