= Dudu Barak =

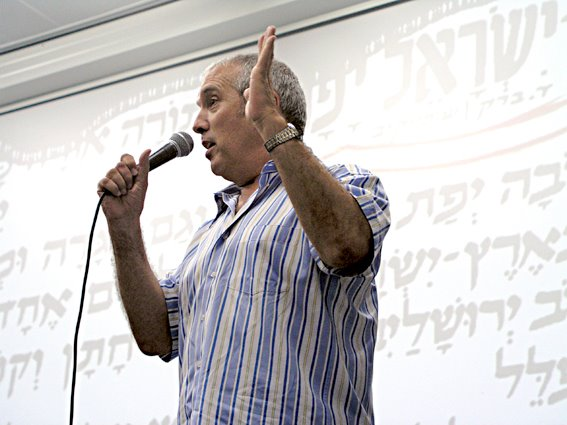
Dudu Barak (2010)

Dudu Barak (Hebrew: דודו ברק; born February 6, 1948) is an Israeli poet, songwriter, and radio presenter.

== Biography ==
Dud Barak was born in Jerusalem to Polish emigrants Leah and Yehoshua Wild (וילד). Later the family moved to Holon. After high school he started his IDF service in the armored corps, but later he became presenter and music program editor at the military radio station Galei Tzahal. After discharge he graduated from the RCA Institute (United States) after studying television, directing, producing and narration.

Upon return to Jerusalem he started working at the radio stations Israel Broadcasting Authority until his retirement. In the meantime, he also graduated from the Hebrew University in Jerusalem in Hebrew Literature, Arts, Jewish Folklore and Education.

He published his first poems in 1968. He wrote over 400 songs. He also published several poetry and children's books.

== Awards ==
A number of Baracks's songs got awards at various music festivals. In addition, he received:

- Prime Minister's Prize for Hebrew Literary Works, 1988.
- ACUM Lifetime Achievement Award, 2009.
- Bar Ilan University Lifetime Achievement Award, 2013.
- Ein Gev Music Festival Lifetime Achievement Award, 2013.
- Meir Ariel Award for Creativity in the Hebrew Language, Rishon LeZion Municipality, 2016.
