= Aki Avni =

Israeli actor

- אקי אבני
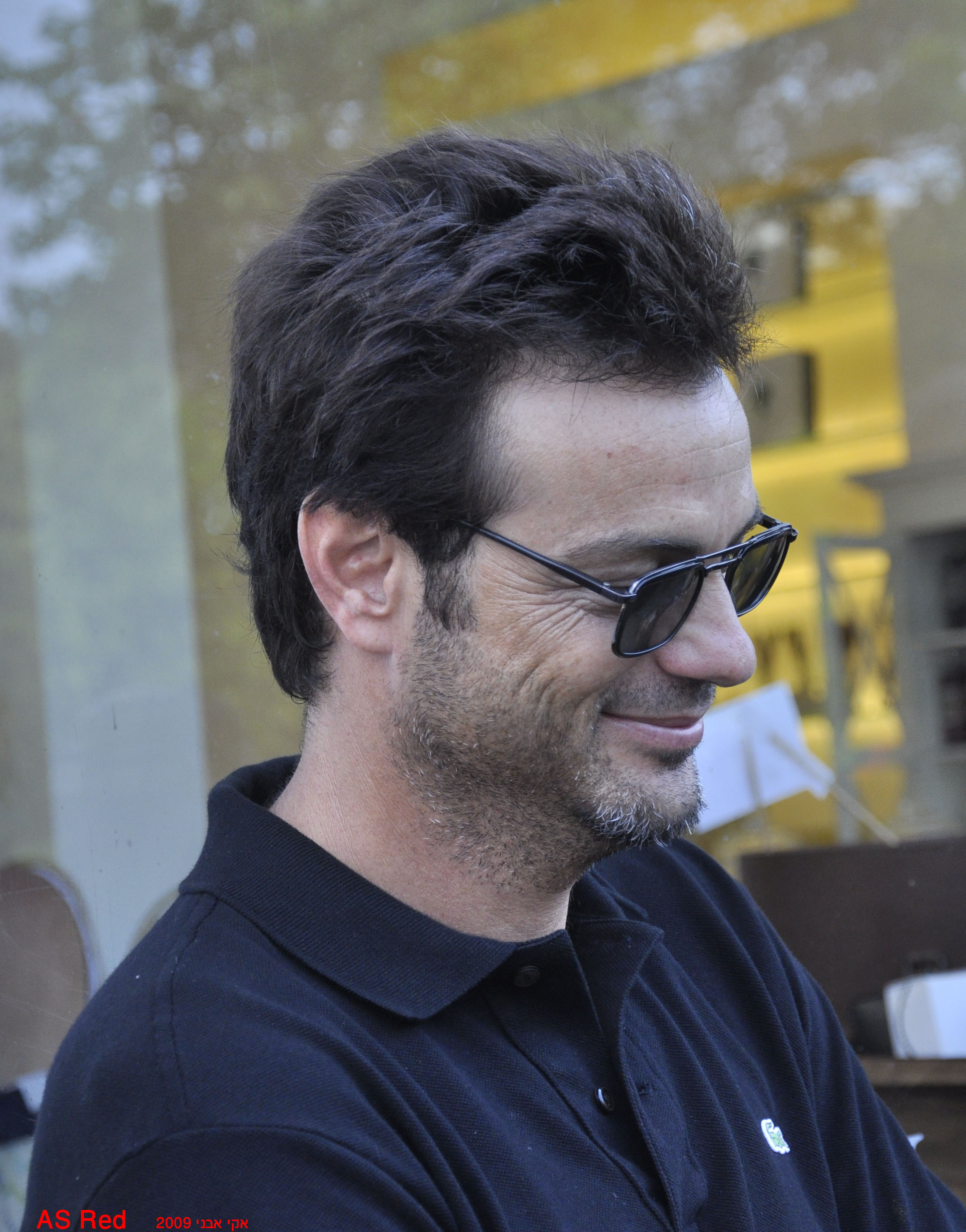
- Born: Yitzhak Avni; 27 April 1967 (age 59); Rehovot, Israel
- Occupations: Actor, host
- Spouses: Sendi Bar; Nicole Miller
- Children: 3

Yitzhak "Aki" Avni (Hebrew: יצחק "אקי" אבני; born 27 April 1967) is an Israeli actor, entertainer and television host. He appeared in the movie Free Zone (2005). He also played the character Mohsen in the second season of the television series 24.

== Early life and marriage ==
Avni was born and raised in Rehovot, Israel, to Turkish-born Sephardic Jewish parents. While in school he began performing in shows in his hometown and had a modeling career. He performed his military service in 1985-1988 in the Israeli Air Force and was discharged with the rank of sergeant. He was married to Israeli model and actress Sendi Bar. They resided for several years in Los Angeles with their child and separated after returning to Israel in 2008. Avni married to Nicole Miller in 2014. They have 2 children and reside in Herzliya, Israel.

== Entertainment and acting career ==
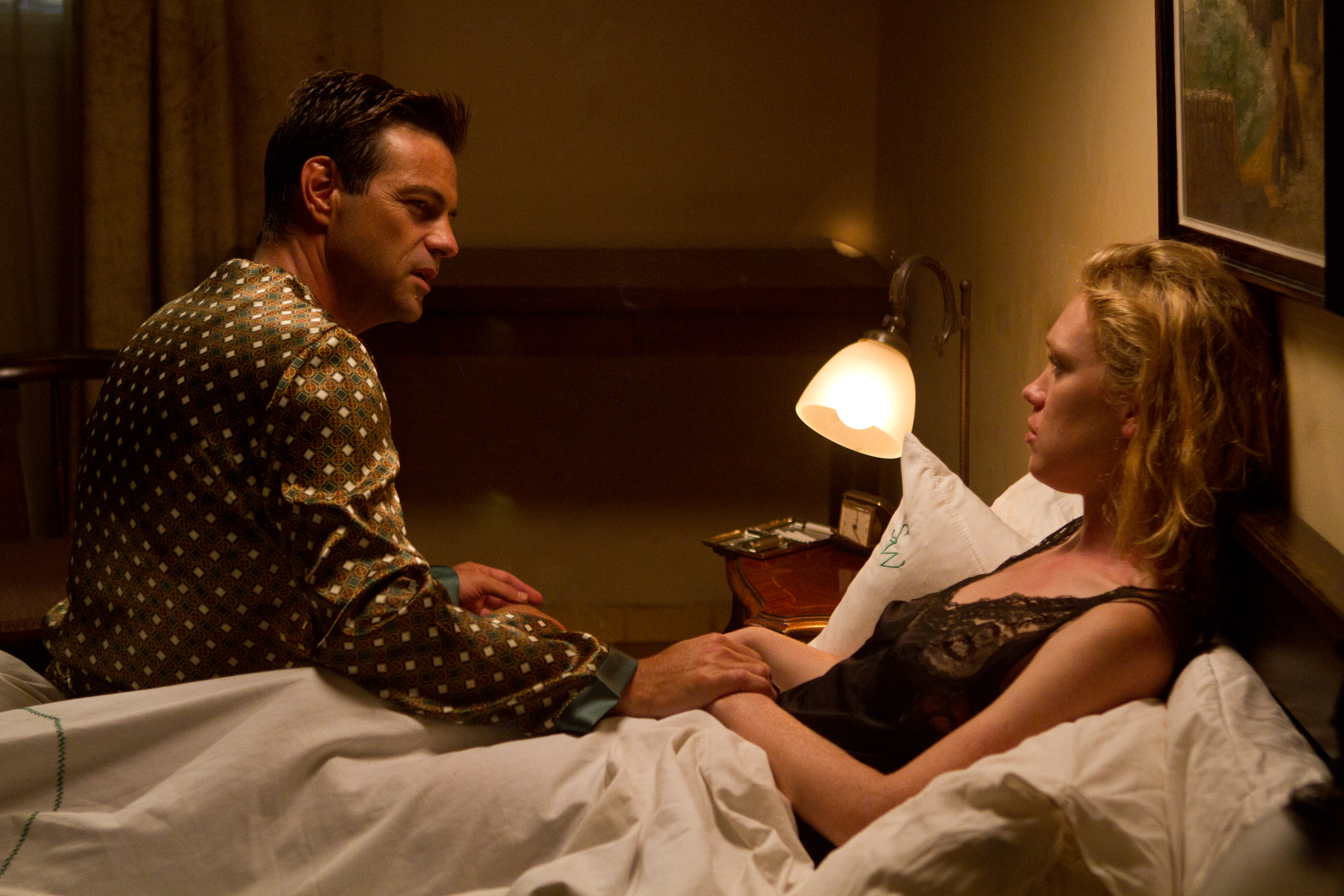
Aki Avni in The Fifth Heaven

Following his military service, Avni joined an entertainment troupe at a hotel in Eilat, appeared in children's shows and commercials, and trained at Yoram Levinstein's acting studio. He gained wider exposure when he became a co-host on Arutz 1's Tossess youth television program.

In 1992 he starred in the musical Lelackek T'toot ('Licking the Strawberry'), in Naarei Hachof (The Beach Boys) and played a young homosexual man in Amos Guttman's last film, (Chesed Mufla, Amazing Grace). In 1993 he appeared in the film Zarrim Balaila (Strangers in the Night).

In 1994, on the new Channel 2, Avni began hosting the dating show Stutz (Fling) and appeared in the musical Pachot o Yoter (More or Less, and Israeli version of The Price Is Right). In 1995 he hosted the Pre-Eurovision contest with Michaela Bercu, appeared in the film Sachkanim (Actors), in the musical Grease, and starred in the musical West Side Story. He has hosted the Miss Israel Pageant and other beauty pageants.

In 2012, Avni led Israel's Public Diplomacy Ministry's Faces of Israel mission to English-speaking countries. This comprised 100 Israelis including "settlers, Arabs, artists, experts in national security, gay people, and immigrants from Ethiopia [to] represent and defend the state".

In 2019 he appeared alongside Nicole Raidman as her love interest in two music videos.

== Filmography ==
- JAG
- 24
- Huff
- My Mom's New Boyfriend
- Damascus Cover
- Time of Favor
- Amazing Grace

== Musical Theatre ==
- Grease
- West Side Story
- Assassins
- Hasamba
- Mary Lou

Media offices
Preceded by Nir Levy	Ophir Award Best Actor; 2001	Succeeded by Lior Ashkenazi
Preceded by Yael Abecassis	Miss Israel host 2001–2002	Succeeded by Orna Datz
