= Shva Salhoov =

Israeli poet

Shva Salhoov שבא שלהוב
- Born: Kiryat Ekron
- Occupations: Poet, writer, essayist

Shva Salhoov (Hebrew: שבא שלהוב; born in 1963) is an Israeli poet, essayist, writer and art critic.

== Biography ==
Salhoov was born in Kiryat Ekron in 1963, to Libyan immigrants to Israel. She attended the May Boyar residential high school in Jerusalem, which she cites as a watershed in her personal development: The Mizrahi girl from a traditionally religious family from Israel's social and geographical periphery, found herself trying to fit into these privileged Ashkenzi liberal Western academic and social environs. Salhoov calls is "secular indoctrination", and points out how the pathway to success – in terms of Israeli hegemonic society – was preordained for students in her school: Enlist to the "right" army unit, get the "right" professional degree, listen to the "right" music. Only she found herself at constant odd and conflict between her inner self and he external surrounding, conflict which is at the heart of her literary work.

During her compulsory military service, Salhoov worked as a writer for "Bamahane", the military magazine. She then went on to study film at Beit Zvi Academy, and completed a master's degree in Jewish philosophy at the Tel Aviv University. Her time in film school caused her a mental breakdown. In an interview with Haaretz, Salhoov relates how the social and class gaps were even more pronounced in this setting, how parents were expected to fund productions, and how her desire to create work relating to Jewish spirituality was stamped out.

After her studies she returned to her parents' home, only to find out that her time away, since the age of 12, changed her in ways that made her feel foreign here as well. Her wish to read and study her father's holy texts was forbidden, and she cites this moment as when she understood the meaning of patriarchy. Here, too, she experienced conflict – her parents sent her away to school out of love, to give her the best opportunities; and yet, within their walls she had to regress. She took this pain, and translated it into literature. Her first book, a collection of short prose, Onat Hameshugaim (Season of the Lunatics) came out in 1996. In 2000, she wrote a children's book and in 2003, her first poetry collection came out, Ir VeNasheiha (A City and Its Women). The book won the Yehuda Amichai Literary Award. She has since published additional volumes of essays and poetry.

Her 2011 book, Torat HaHitukhim (The Theory of Intersecting) blends poetry and prose with word of visual art, and includes critiques on both the secularization of Israel, and the politicization of religion in the country, stating that Israel is "missing its spiritual goals", and must face its position as a Middle Eastern country, and stop pretending to be part of Europe. These themes are also found in her 2005 novel, Ma Yesh Lakh, Ester (What's the Matter, Esther?). Throughout, she also expresses her feminist self, by describing contrasting contemporary and traditional roles and behaviors of men and women.

Salhoov is regularly published in literary journals, such as Odot and Theory & Criticism. She is an art critic, who writes regularly for newspapers and magazines. She also curates art exhibits.

== Books ==
- Onat Hameshugaim / עונת המשוגעים (Sifriyat Maariv, 1996), (short stories).
- Masa HaOtiyot shel Tamara / מסע האותיות של תמרה (Hed Arzi, 2000), children's book.
- Ir VeNasheiha / עיר ונשיה (Keter Publishing 2003).
- Ma Yesh Lakh, Ester / מה יש לך, אסתר (Keter Publishing, 2005), novel.
- Torat HaHitukhim / תורת החיתוכים (Divrei-m, 2011), poetry].
- Masot Al Amanut VeYahadut / מסות על אמנות ויהדות, Resling, 2017
