= Nir Jacob Kaplan =

Israeli actor

- ניר יעקוב קפלן
- Born: Nir Jacob Kaplan; 8 August 1989 (age 36); Tel Aviv, Israel
- Occupations: Actor, Radio Broadcaster
- Years active: 1995–present

Nir Jacob Kaplan (Hebrew: ניר יעקוב קפלן; born 8 August 1989) is an Israeli actor, entertainer and a radio presenter. He appeared in the Israeli children TV show Yami with Dafna Dekel. Entering his adulthood he also presented a Nationally syndicated radio program berosh tsair (Hebrew: בראש צעיר).

== Early life ==
The son of Lieutenant Colonel Moti Kaplan, a former military man, and Tami Kaplan, a housewife and former officer in the Israel Defense Forces, Kaplan was born in Tel Aviv, Israel. He grew up in Herzeliya, Israel, where the family moved soon after his birth. He was raised as an Orthodox Jew, under the strict rule of his religious father. At the age of five he was diagnosed as a gifted child by the teachers in his kindergarten in Herzeliya, but relinquished his academic pursuits in favour of his theatrical aspirations.

== Career ==
Nirs first onscreen appearance was on the hit children TV series Yami in 1995 Where he starred as the young child Noam searching for the logic of behind number counting. He found his answers through many adventures and comical moments. After the show ended in 1997 Kaplan kept a low profile, preferring to hone his acting talents and study journalism in preparation for his next project, which was to be his greatest in his early life. berosh tsair (Hebrew: בראש צעיר) was a nationally syndicated radio program broadcast on "Reshet Alef" (Hebrew: רשת א') in which Kaplan took over the duty of main presenter and editor. He worked feverishly on the show while negotiating with the Israel Defense Forces on the service for his country as a celebrity entertainer. He was eventually drafted into the Military Police Corps, where the nature of his service cannot be disclosed. He is due to be discharged from the army on 2 February 2011.
