= Milky (pudding) =

Israeli dairy product

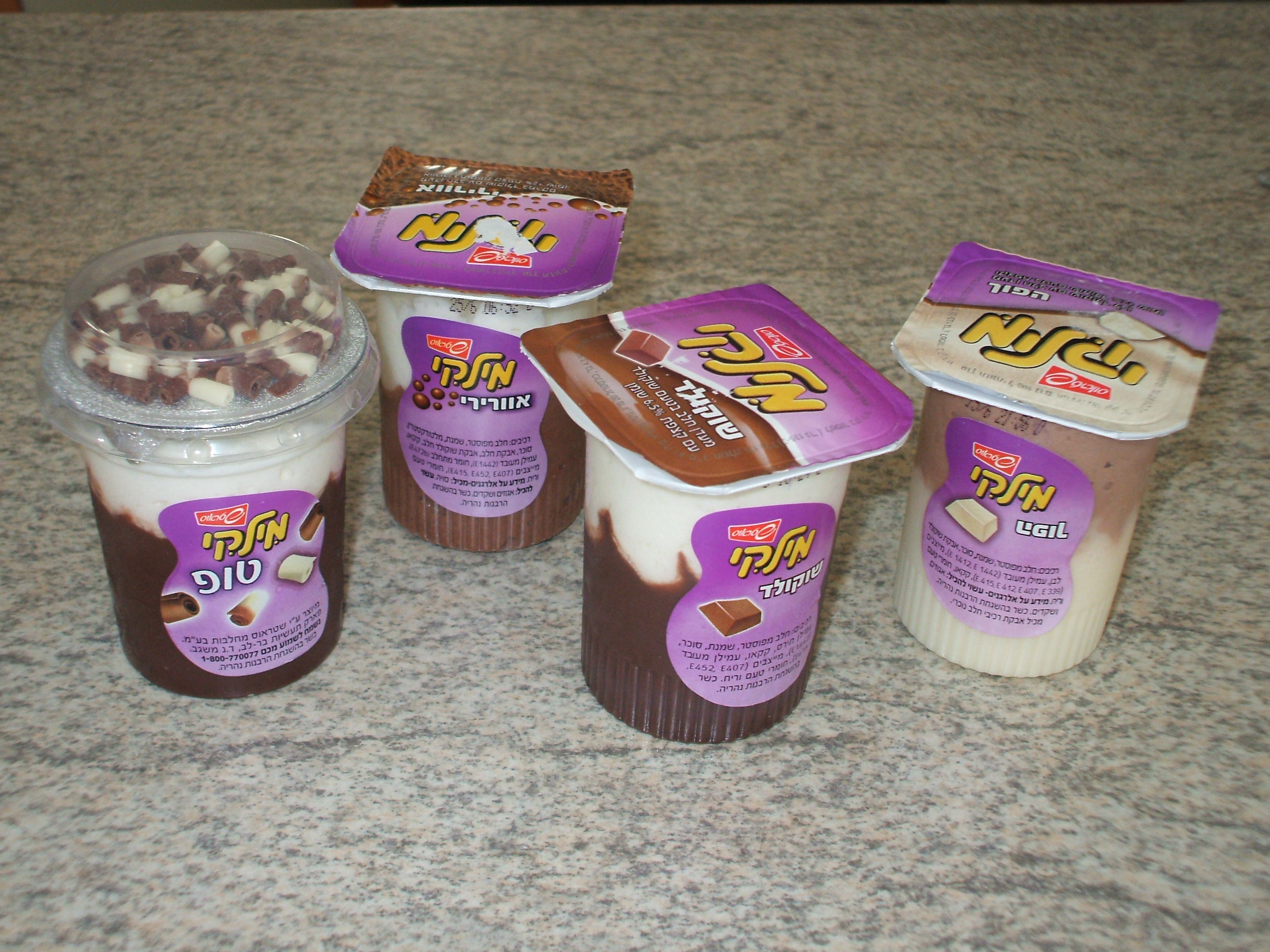
Milky in different flavors

Milky (Hebrew: מילקי, milqi) is a dairy pudding produced in Israel by the Strauss Group.

Released into the Israeli market in 1980, Milky is sold in containers with chocolate pudding on the bottom and whipped cream on the top. Milky was identical, in its original version, to a dessert sold by Groupe Danone in Germany as "Dany Sahne".

In 1986, Strauss premiered Milky's first video commercial to Israeli moviegoers entitled "Battle of the Milky". The commercial led to two sequels, "Battle of the Milky 2" and "Battle of the Milky 3". The actresses in the commercials were known as "Milky girls" and often became icons in their own rights, Sendi Bar, Hilla Nachshon or Bar Refaeli among them. In 2003, a 22-year-old Technion student, Elaad Yair, discovered that whipped cream, used in Milky, contained a rennet-based gelatin. Vegetarians and those who keep kosher complained, resulting in the company's announcement that it would henceforth only use vegetable-based gelatin.

== See also ==
- Olim L'Berlin
