= Franci Slak =

Slovenian film director

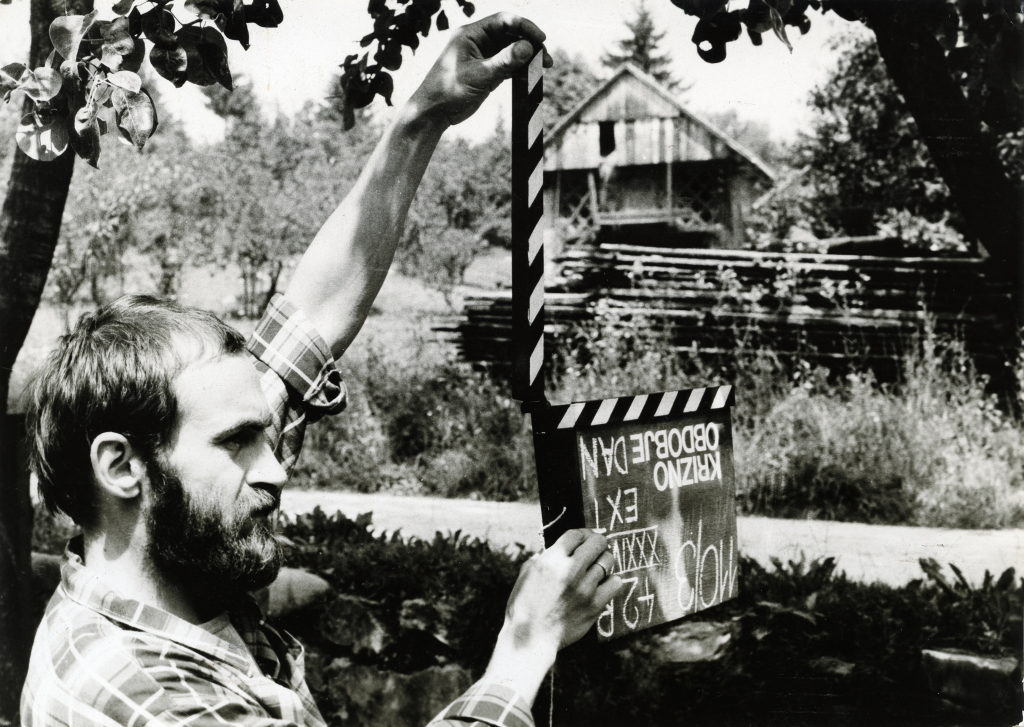
- Born: 1 February 1953; Krško, Slovenia
- Died: 27 October 2007 (aged 54); Ljubljana, Slovenia
- Occupations: Film director Film producer Screenwriter; Lecturer; Politician
- Years active: 1981-2007

Franci Slak (1 February 1953 – 27 October 2007) was a Slovenian film director, producer, screenwriter, lecturer and politician. His 1987 film Hudodelci (The Felons) was entered into the 38th Berlin International Film Festival.

== Early life ==
Slak, alongside his family, moved to the coastal town of Koper at an early age. He finished his primary and secondary schooling there. He first enrolled at the AGRFT in Ljubljana to study filmmaking, but later moved to Łódź in Poland, where he finished his studies as a Master of Filmmaking in 1978. He became a regular lecturer at his Ljubljana alma mater in 1980 and stayed employed there until his death.

He received the Badjur prize three times (in 1981, 1985 and 1987) and also added the Prešeren Fund Award to his name in 1988.

He was the president of the Board of programming of Active Slovenia. As a candidate of the party, he bid unsuccessfully for the position of the Mayor of Ljubljana.

He died after a severe illness in 2007. Right before his death, he filmed a low-budget autobiographical film called "Kakor v nebesih, tako na zemlji" (On Earth as it is in Heaven), which aired publicly on RTV Slovenia in December of that year.

== Filmography ==
Directed

- Eva (1983)
- Butnskala (1985)
- Pesnikov portret z dvojnikom (2002)

Produced

- Outsider (1997)
- Slepa pega (2002)
- Tu pa tam (2004)

Directed and wrote the script of

- Hudodelci (1987)
- Krizno obdobje (1981)
- Kakor v nebesih, tako na zemlji (2007)

Directed, produced and wrote the script of

- Ko zaprem oči (1993)
