= When I Close My Eyes (1993 film) =

1993 film

- Directed by: Franci Slak
- Written by: Franci Slak
- Starring: Petra Govc
- Release date: October 1993 (Chicago)
- Running time: 99 minutes
- Country: Slovenia
- Language: Slovene

When I Close My Eyes (Slovene: Ko zaprem oči) is a 1993 Slovenian thriller film directed by Franci Slak. The film was selected as the Slovenian entry for the Best Foreign Language Film at the 66th Academy Awards, but was not accepted as a nominee.

== Cast ==
- Petra Govc as Anna
- Pavle Ravnohrib as Inspector
- Mira Sardo as Aunt
- Valter Dragan as Ivan

== See also ==
- List of submissions to the 66th Academy Awards for Best Foreign Language Film
- List of Slovenian submissions for the Academy Award for Best Foreign Language Film
