= Alona Kimhi =

Israeli author and actress

- אלונה קמחי
- Born: Lvov, Ukraine
- Occupations: Author and actress

Alona Kimhi (Hebrew: אלונה קמחי; born 1963) is an Israeli award-winning author and former actress.

== Biography ==
Alona Kimhi was born in Lviv, Ukraine (then in the Soviet Union), in 1966 and emigrated to Israel with her family in 1972.

Following her army service, in a Kibbutz in the Negev Desert, she moved to Tel-Aviv and studied acting at the Beit Zvi Academy of Dramatic Arts, where she graduated with honours and began her career as a Film and Theatre actress. Alona starred in several Israeli and international films, including Himmo, King of Jerusalem, “Abba Ganuv”, and "Tobe Hooper’s Night Terrors", as well as playing leading roles in plays by Shakespeare, Arthur Miller and Tennessee Williams.

In the late 1980s, Kimhi started writing lyrics to songs by her spouse, Israeli musician Izhar Ashdot, writing articles for major magazines and began writing short stories.

Her first collection of short stories won the 1994 anonymous ACUM literary contest and the resulting book I Anastasia was published a year later to critical acclaim and became a national bestseller, winning the Israeli Copyright Society prestigious Book of the Year Award.

By the late 1990s, Kimhi became a full-time writer. Her second book and first novel, Weeping Susannah, published in 1998, won the 1999 Bernstein Award for Best Novel and the French WIZO award. It has since been translated into 16 languages, and published in major international publishing houses, such as Gallimard in France where she is a well-known author.

In 2009, her novel Weeping Susanna was dramatized as a miniseries for the Israeli cable TV channel Hot 3.

Alona Kimhi lives in Tel Aviv with her spouse Izhar Ashdot and their son Ilai, writing novels, plays and screenplays for Film and TV.

== Awards ==
- In 1996, Kimhi was awarded the ACUM Book of the Year Prize for I, Anastasia.
- In 1999, she was the joint recipient of the Bernstein Prize (original Hebrew novel category), for her first novel, Weeping Susannah. The other prize recipient was Yocheved Reisman.
- In 2001, she received the French WIZO Prize.
- In 2001, she was awarded the Prime Minister's Prize.

== Published works ==
=== Books published in Hebrew ===
- I, Anastasia (stories), Keter, 1996 [Ani, Anastasia]
- (novel), Keter, 1999 [Susannah Ha-Bochiah]
- Lily La Tigresse (novel), Keter, 2004 [Lily La Tigresse]
- Victor and Masha (novel), Keter, 2012

=== Children ===
- Superbabe and the Enchanted Circle Jerusalem, Keter, 2001 [Mushlemet Ve Ha-Maagal Ha-Mechushaf]

=== Books in translation ===
- I, Anastasia

English: London/New York, Toby Press, 2000
German: in paperback: Berlin, Berlin Verlag, 2005
French: Paris, Gallimard, 2008

- Weeping Susannah

Dutch: Amsterdam, Meulenhoff, 2001
French: Paris, Gallimard, 2001; in paperback: Gallimard/Folio, 2003
English: London, Harvill, 2001; New York, Harvill/Farrar Straus, 2002, ISBN 978-1-86046-903-9
Italian: Milan, Rizzoli, 2001
Swedish: Stockholm, Wahlstrom/Widstrand, 2001
Portuguese: Lisbon, Asa, 2002
Finnish: Helsinki, Tammi, 2003
Greek: Athens, Psichogios, 2002
German: Munich, Carl Hanser, 2002; in paperback: Berlin, Berlin Verlag, 2004
Spanish: Barcelona, Galaxia Gutenberg, 2004
Polish: Warsaw, WAB, 2006
Chinese: Hefei, Anhui Literature & Art Pubs, 2008
Turkish: Istanbul, Aclik Defter, 2011
Czech: Prague, Garamond Press, 2014

- Lily La Tigresse

English: USA, Dalkey Archive Press, 2014
German: Munich, Carl Hanser, 2006; pback: Berlin, Berlin Verlag, forthcoming
French: Paris, Gallimard, 2006; in paperback: Folio, 2007
Portuguese: Porto, Asa, 2009
Italian: Milan, Ugo Guanda, 2007

- Victor and Masha

French: Paris, Gallimard, 2012

- Lunar Eclipse

English: Translator Yael Lotan, Toby Press, 2001

== Sources ==
- Alona Kimhi at the Institute of the Translation of Hebrew Literature
