= Fábrica de Arte Cubano =

Coordinates: 23.12745°N 82.40994°W

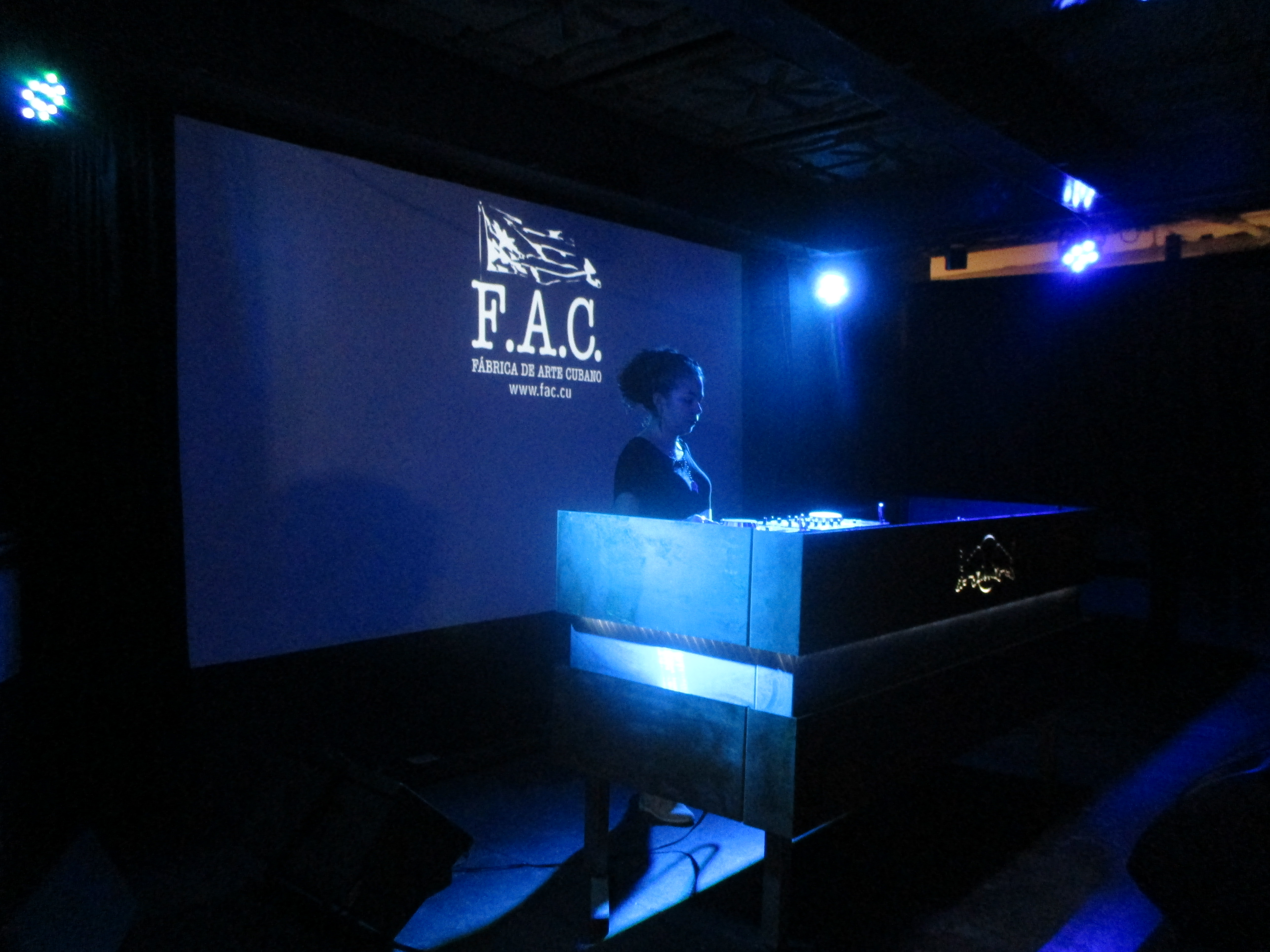
Fabrica de Arte Cubano, club area.

La Fábrica de Arte Cubano (known locally as La Fábrica de Arte or F.A.C) is an art gallery and club in Havana, Cuba. The Fábrica's gallery and stage were established inside of a former cooking oil factory, and has since gained fame as one of Havana's premier nightclubs and art galas. Several news outlets have described the factory as a symbol of Cuba's accelerating opening to the world.

== History ==
The structure housing La Fábrica de Arte was built in 1910 as a cooking oil factory. In 2008 a group of Cuban artists and musicians began to look for a centralized location in which art could be shown, leading to the group acquiring the closed factory in 2010. The current location opened in February 2014. It has been noted that the establishment attracts young Cubans and foreign nationals.
