= Arik Rudich =

Israeli film score composer (1954–2019)

Arik Rudich אריק רודיך
- Born: 22 January 1954; Holon, Israel
- Died: 5 February 2019 (aged 65) Jaffa, Israel
- Genres: Electronic; Secular Jewish; Film music
- Occupations: Composer; music arranger; music producer
- Instruments: Piano; keyboards; synthesiser
- Years active: 1970–2019

Arik Rudich (Hebrew: אריק רודיך; 22 January 1954 – 5 February 2019) was an Israeli composer, electronic musician, music arranger and music producer.
