= Enrique Rottenberg =

Israeli artist

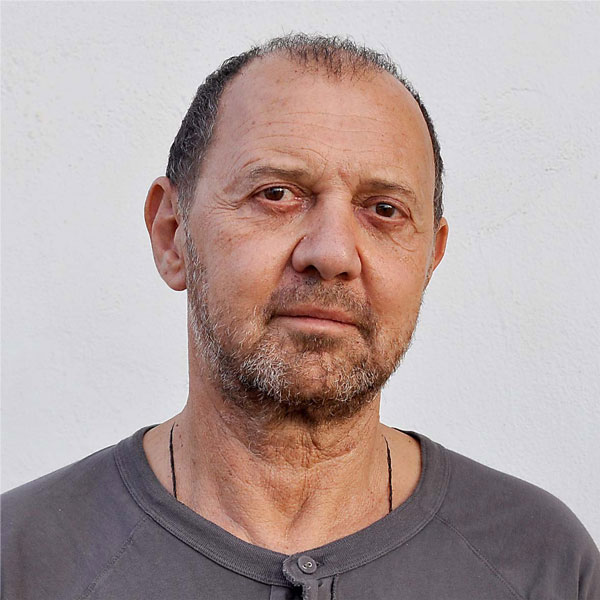
- Born: August 12, 1948 (age 78); Argentina, Buenos Aires
- Known for: Photography
- Movement: photography and installation

Enrique Rottenberg (August 12, 1948) is an artist currently working with photography and installations. Born in Argentina in 1948, to Jewish parents of Polish descent, he emigrated alone to Israel at the age of 13.

== Biography ==
After serving in the Israeli army, Rottenberg developed a real estate business, while at the same time, beginning in 1980, he started producing films and studied at the Camera Obscura School in Tel Aviv. Among his known films are: Nagua, Bar 51, Himo the King of Jerusalem (by filmmaker Amos Gutman) and the film The Elected (with Daniel Waksman). He was the director and screenwriter of the film Revenge of Itzik Finkelstein, which won seven awards from the Israeli Film Academy (including Best Film, Best Director and Best Screenplay) and represented Israel in 1994 at the Oscars.

In 1993, he arrived in Cuba where he currently lives. In Cuba, he built the Miramar Trade Center, a major business complex in the city of Havana, which he still runs to this day. In this center, he has also created a significant Cuban art collection for the country.

He wrote the novel Cejalinda, published under the title: La mujer de su vida, Quarto, Spain, in 2006.

In Cuba, he began his photographic work. In 2010, his first series Sleeping with... (Dormir con) was exhibited at the Cuban Photo Library (National Photography Museum), which is now part of the collection of this institution and of numerous private and institutional collections, along with other works of his. Sleeping with... was selected by Discoveries of PhotoEspaña 2011. He took part in the 2012 Havana Biennial with two of his series, The Family and Self-portraits.

Among the most important series are: Self-portraits (2011–2014), The Family (2011–2013), Forgotten (2013), Cuts (2013–2014) as well as large format works such as The Line (2014), Centipede (2014) and photo installations: 19 women and one bed (2012) and The dance (2014).

He collaborates with the new cultural project “Cuban Art Factory” (Fábrica de Arte Cubano), promoting the development of contemporary photography and visual arts in Cuba.

== Photographic work ==
The photographic work of Enrique Rottenberg has been considered controversial, satirical, manic-melancholic, lewd, empathic, alarming. The reasons behind the attraction that it causes, whether it be of allure or tension, laughter or pain, surprise or rejection, beauty and horror, are diverse, but they all seem to be gathered in a certain way under the Schelling's definition of the term: the disturbing oddness or the ominous (unheimlich): "(...) everything that being intended to remain a secret, hidden, has come to light."

In this analysis, familiar subjects are presented as paradoxical or absurd. Rottenberg's photography can be viewed as an extension of his film work, capturing motionless scenes, static characters, and suspended environments. These elements appear captured in a fixed state, yet this surface presentation suggests an underlying, alternate depiction of reality and fantasy.

There is a movement that doesn't stop within Rottenberg's work, repeated and distressing, which builds its multiple layers, all the way from the greatly theatrical to the edge of reality. From the shadows of dreams to the brutal light of the vigil, from self-narcissism to mass psychology, to find the way out at any cost, reaching the encounter with what cannot be reconciled. In these provocations there's a struggle, away of resisting. Resisting the orders and those who dictate, but also the dominated and defeated. The gods, the myths, the mimicry and consensus, but to some instance of resisting to destiny itself, to all the established and pre-established destinies, even that off innateness and the indecipherable meaning of life? Rottenberg is a manufacturer of history, because history is the necessity of life, in its differences with death.

He is also a destroyer of illusions. He has the ability to distress the subject, until he reveals some invisible, strange place within himself. The looks in his portraits are incisive, painful, powerful, and at the end of that open crack primary helplessness looms. In his composition she uses eloquent backgrounds, as if what is behind the scene were the undertone of his real meaning.

Rottenberg's language has been described as paradoxical, from where that feeling of surprise and perplexity in his art comes from. On one side he is directly affective, unwilling to re-create metaphors. His images have been described as cries, onomatopoeias, moans, and silences. On the other hand, he makes poetry, creating metaphors as a side effect, immanent to affectionate, and self-produced, always multiple and open metaphors and symbols, but also downright personal. The disruption of the compositional syntax, the variety of colors found, the exposed textures, and the bluntness, are what create a style, and at the limit, an enigma. A wandering language without a country, that of an identity that escapes from the identical, always becoming. Becoming-man, becoming-animal, becoming-woman, becoming-mass, becoming-another.

== Statements of his series ==
- Sleeping with...: This is a series that creates a testimony. Throughout the entire island of Cuba, hundreds of very diverse bedrooms were photographed, always encountering the unique characteristic of the Cuban idiosyncrasy that made it all possible: their hospitality. Trespassing the boundaries of public space in order to introduce ourselves into a home's most private place, where people spend a third of their lives, where they dream, lay sleepless, undress, procreate... The absence of its inhabitants gives life to the settings, objects, decorations, floors and walls, telling us the individual and collective history. (These images share the silence and the feeling of Suite Habana, by Fernando Pérez).
- The Family: The Family is our own mirror reversed once and again, a parody of society; each image takes to the absurd certain values and ideals, that are sold to us and dominate our existence. But more than that, they include in this same world things that in one way or another are excluded, not repeating publicly proclaimed consciousness; and seeing what happens at the limit. Therefore, this is a work – experiment.
- Forgotten: A witness of the forgotten souls that live in bygone colonial homes, ghosts with no present and without memories; witnesses of those forgotten who have forgotten themselves. (One more tribute to Memorias del Subdesarrollo/ Memories of Underdevelopment, by Tomas Gutiérrez Alea)
- Self-portraits: These are staging's [sic] of imaginary beings with their plots and traumas, universal myths and personal fantasies, the dark sides of their neurosis and their social status. These are the result of intimate psychoanalytical sessions between me and the camera, that once and a while [sic] allow me to lighten the burden of being
- Cuts: A portrait invites us to the inner self of a person, in order to discover their internal fissures, what happens when the image itself has a fissure? An unfinished image takes the spectator to share the incompleteness inherent to subjectivity and life itself, its divisions and gashes. These are portraits that expose the interior exile which for many is the main objective.
- Utopia: In Enrique Rottenberg's recent compositions, gathered by under the misleading word Utopia, there is explicit movement from the self to the masses, from a self-referential subject to the artificial masses: man-mass, woman-mass, people-mass... Social mechanisms unfold on large formats, articulated bodies, connections, forming machine-like devices which consensus engineering puts into motion. These are photo installations of social installations, which make one or the other of its constructive elements visible, all acting on us without us actually realizing it, alienating elements brought to evidence. From its scaffolding emerges a social imaginary) for minorities, understood by Deleuze as those are not represented in the consensus model, but rather those marginalized from it, lost, all invisible under cloak of the proposal of how to be happy, how to get goods, how to be recognized, how to exercise our sexuality, of ambiguous political ideals and even of standardized beauty, the Utopias of the social institutions.

== Exhibitions and collections ==
Solo exhibitions

- Shifting Metaphors: Cuba in changing times: ROSFOTO, San Petersburg, 2017
- RQR, with Carlos Quintana y Maurice Renoma, FotoFAC: Cuban Art Factory, Havana, 2017
- The Double (in collaboration with Carlos Quintana): ArtLima, Lima, Perú, 2017
- Double: FotoFAC, Cuban Art Factory, Havana, 2016
- Utopia: Kunsthalle HGN, Duderstadt, Germany, 2016
- Enrique Rottenberg exhibits, Fotogram, Amsterdam, Netherland 2011.
- Sleeping with...: Rita Castellote Gallery, Madrid, Spain, 2011.
- Sleeping with...: Globs, Vienna, Austria, 2011.
- Self-Portraits: Video Art Festival, Camaguey, Cuba, 2011.
- Sleeping with...: Photo Gallery of Cuba (National Museum of Photography), Havana, Cuba, 2010.

Group exhibitions

2018

Dividuos, FotoFAC: Cuban Art Factory, Havana, 2018

2017

Curar la historia: FotoFAC, Cuban Art Factory, Havana, 2017 Critical Mass: FotoFAC, Cuban Art Factory, Havana, 2017 The Improper: FotoFAC, Cuban Art Factory, Havana, Cuba

Critical Mass: FotoFAC, Cuban Art Factory, Havana, Cuba

The Double (in collaboration with Carlos Quintana): Artlima, Lima, Peru

Shifting Metaphores: Cuba in changing times: ROSFOTO, San Petersburg, Russia

2016

Subjects and Predicates: FotoFAC, Cuban Art Factory, Havana, Cuba

Parallel Worlds: FotoFAC, Cuban Art Factory, Havana, Cuba

A hundred years of Cuban Women: National Museum of Photograph, Havana, Cuba

2015

Becoming Animal: FotoFAC, Cuban Art Factory, Havana, Cuba

Utopia: FotoFAC, Cuban Art Factory, Havana, Cuba

2014

- Nobody knows what a body can do, FotoFAC, Cuban Art Factory, Havana, Cuba.
- From the sublime to the ridiculous, FotoFAC, Cuban Art Factory, Havana, Cuba.
- Close up to Cuba, Kunsthalle HGN. Duderstadt, Germany.
- Different Identity, FotoFAC, Cuban Art Factory, Havana, Cuba.
- Labyrinth, FotoFAC, Cuban Art Factory, Havana, Cuba.
- PhotoTel Aviv, Tel Aviv, Israel.

2013

- PhotoTel Aviv, Tel Aviv, Israel.
- Cuba, image and possibility II, Melbourne, Australia.
- Cuba, image and possibility I, Fine Arts National Museum, Brasilia, Brazil.
- Sex in the city, La Acacia Gallery, Havana, Cuba.

2012

- Thinking in common Thoughts, Photo Gallery of Cuba, Havana, Cuba.
- Borderless I, Havana Biennial, Morro Cabaña, Havana, Cuba.
- Borderless II, Havana Biennial, Larramendi Gallery, Havana, Cuba.
- Ambito 21: Women, object or subject?: Latin American Photography Conference, Casa Oswaldo Guayasamin, Havana, Cuba.
- Sports in Arts, Open Space, Revolution and Culture, Havana, Cuba.

2011

- Cuba-Absolut Revolution, Arte x Arte, Buenos Aires, Argentina.

Publications:

- The Allure of a Gaze (Body Photography in Cuba por Rafael Acosta de Arriba), 2014 Ed. Polymita.
- Catalogue Close up Cuba, Kunsthalle HGN, 2014.
- Catalogue Four Seasons, Acropolis Cultural Establishments, 2013.
- Catalogue Dormir con...:(Sleeping with), Acropolis Cultural Establishments, 2010

Collections

National Museum of Photograph (Havana)

Rubin (New York)

MOCA (Los Angeles)

Kunsthalle HGN (Germany)

21c Museum Hotels, U.S.

Madeleine Plonsker, U.S.
