= Jonathan Sagall =

Israeli actor & director (born 1959)

- יהונתן סגל
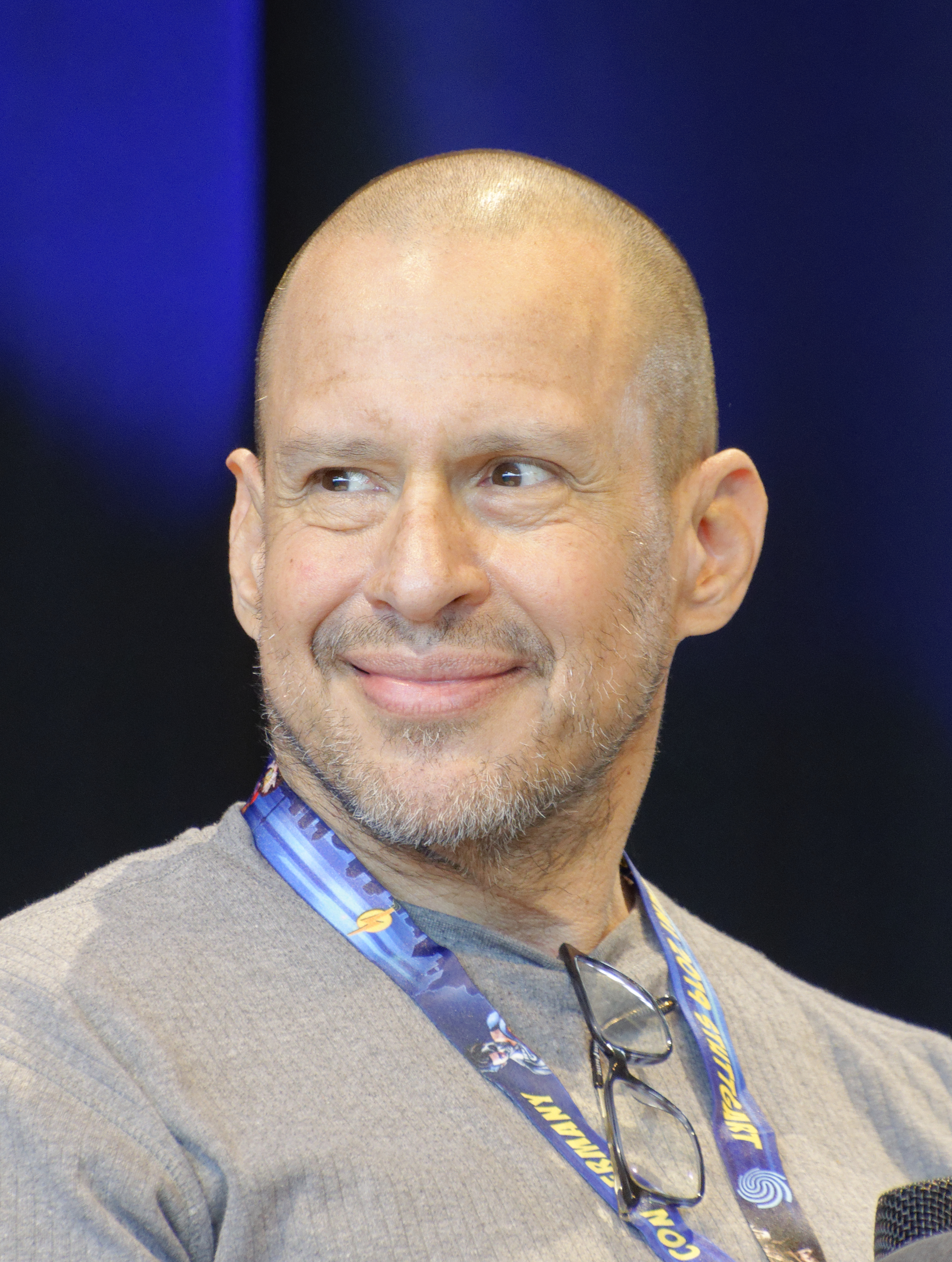
- Sagall in 2021
- Born: 23 April 1959 (age 67); Toronto, Ontario, Canada
- Citizenship: Israeli; Canadian
- Occupations: Actor; director; producer; screenwriter
- Years active: 1977–present
- Mother: Ruth Sagall

Jonathan Sagall (Hebrew: יהונתן סגל; born 23 April 1959) is a Canadian-born Israeli actor, director, producer and screenwriter.

== Early life ==
Sagall was born to a Jewish family in Toronto, Ontario, Canada. Several members of his family were survivors of the Holocaust, who then immigrated from Poland to Israel after World War II, then to Canada. Sagall immigrated to Israel from Canada with his family at age 3. During the rest of his childhood, Sagall grew up in Haifa, Israel, and eventually graduated from the Hebrew Reali School in this city. His mother, Ruth Sagall, was an actress at the Haifa Theatre.

== Career ==
At a young age, Sagall did stagework for local Israeli theaters. His first appearance as an actor occurred in a 1977 Israeli television film which did not gain much attention. Sagall gained much success after he played Momo in the successful 1978 Israeli film Lemon Popsicle (Eskimo Limon) which became an Israeli cult film, and reprised the role in 6 of the 7 sequels: Going Steady (1979), Hot Bubblegum (1981), Private Popsicle (1982), Baby Love (1984), Young Love (1987) and Summertime Blues (1988).

In 1979, Sagall was an actor in the New Media Bible Series as Joseph.

In 1983, Sagall played the lead role in the drama Drifting directed by Amos Guttman, where he played a lonely young homosexual man who attempts to find love and break into the movie business. During the mid-1980s, Sagall began producing and directing short films.

He appeared opposite Diane Keaton in the 1984 George Roy Hill film The Little Drummer Girl. In 1992 Sagall was cast in the role of Poldek Pfefferberg, in the film Schindler's List which was produced and directed by Steven Spielberg.

As a screenwriter and film director, Sagall created and directed the 1998 drama film Link City (קשר עיר), in which he also played a supporting role. Among the other films he created - The Jewish State and blood.

His 1999 film Urban Feel was entered into the 49th Berlin International Film Festival.

In 2007, Sagall participated in the TV series HaMakom (The Place) in Channel 10.

His 2011 film Lipstikka premiered at the 61st Berlin International Film Festival and was nominated for the Golden Bear.

== Filmography ==
Film
Year	Title	Role	Notes
1978	Lemon Popsicle	Momo / Bobby / Momo	
1979	Going Steady	Momo / Bobby	
1981	Hot Bubblegum	Bobby / Momo	
1982	Drifting	Robi	
1982	Private Popsicle	Momo / Bobbie	
1983	Ha-Megillah '83		
1983	Baby Love	Momo / Bobbie	
1984	The Little Drummer Girl	Teddy	
1987	Young Love	Bobby	
1988	Summertime Blues	Bobby	
1993	Schindler's List	Poldek Pfefferberg	
1999	Urban Feel	Emanuel / Eva's lover	
