= Edna Mazia =

Israeli screenwriter and playwright (1949–2023)

- עדנה מזי"א
- Born: 24 July 1949; Tel Aviv, Israel
- Died: 10 December 2023 (aged 74); Tel Aviv, Israel
- Burial place: Nahalal Cemetery
- Occupations: Playwright; screenwriter; director; author

Edna Mazia (Hebrew: עדנה מזי"א; 24 July 1949 – 10 December 2023) was an Israeli playwright, author, screenwriter, and director.

== Biography ==
Mazia, born in Tel Aviv as Edna Kutlovitch, was the only child of parents who were deeply involved in the underground militant Zionist movements before the establishment of Israel. Her mother, a Vienna native, was active in Lehi (Lohamei Herut Yisrael, or Fighters for the Freedom of Israel), and her father, a lawyer by profession, commanded the Irgun (Etzel, or National Military Organization) cell in South Africa.

Her parents ideological and underground background provided her the dramatic foundation for the play "The Rebels" ("המורדים"), which was staged at the Cameri Theatre (1998).

=== Career ===
She completed a Master's degree at Tel Aviv University, with a dual focus on philosophy and theatre.

Mazia began her career as a screenwriter, working with film director Amos Guttman on several films in the early 1980s. She transitioned to playwright in the 1990s, with her first play premiering in 1991 at Haifa Theatre.

Mazia was considered as one of the top playwrights in the Israeli theatre, as well as finding success as a theatre director and directing all theatre plays by her friend Anat Gov.

Mazia died in Tel Aviv on 10 December 2023, at the age of 74. She was buried at Nahalal Cemetery.

== Awards ==
Mazia received four awards for her work:

- The Meir Margalit Award in 1997, for the play "Family Story" ("סיפור משפחתי").
- The Leah Goldberg Award, for the play "Family Story."
- Playwright of the Year by the Israeli Theatre Prize Association for 1998/1999, for the play "The Rebels" ("המורדים").
- The Meir Margalit Award in 1999, for the play "The Rebels."
