= Sharon Alexander =

Israeli actor

- שרון אלכסנדר
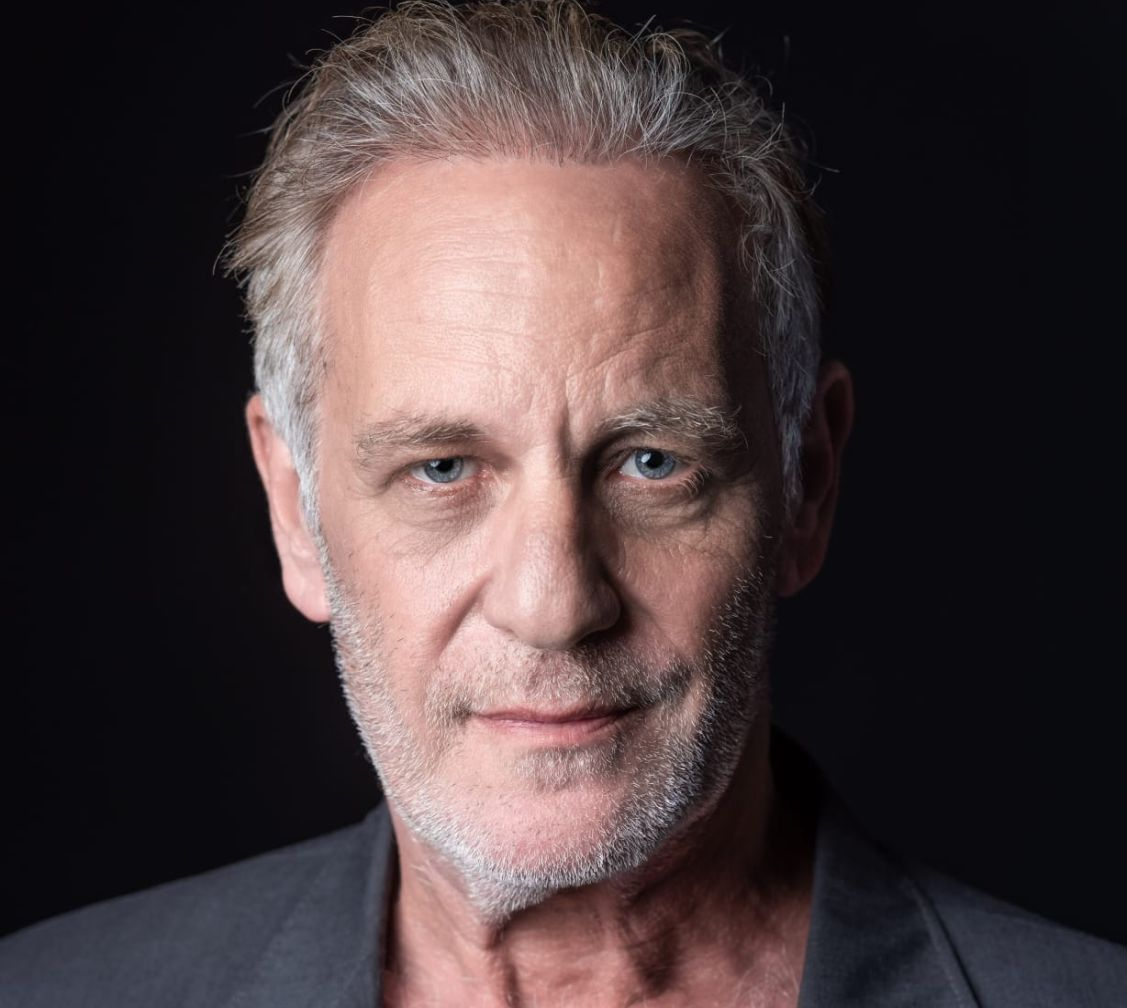
- Born: Sharon Cohen; 21 May 1962 (age 62); Kiryat Tiv'on, Israel
- Occupation: Actor
- Years active: 1977–present

Sharon Alexander (Hebrew: שרון אלכסנדר; born 21 May 1962) is an Israeli actor.
