= Amos Guttman =

Israeli film director (1954–1993)

- עמוס גוטמן
- Born: 10 May 1954; Sita Buzăului, Romania
- Died: 16 February 1993 (aged 38); Tel Aviv, Israel
- Occupations: Film director; screenwriter; producer
- Years active: 1975–1993

Amos Guttman (Hebrew: עמוס גוטמן; 10 May 1954 – 16 February 1993) was an Israeli film director, born in Romania. He directed the first-ever Israeli LGBT-themed film and most of his films were based on events that happened in his own personal life.

== Biography ==
Guttman was born in Sita Buzăului, district of Covasna, in Transylvania, Romania and emigrated to Israel at the age of seven with his family. He studied film at Beit Zvi. Between 1975 and 1982, Guttman directed three short films: A Safe Place, Returning Premiers, and Drifting. In 1983, he directed his feature debut, Drifting (no relation to the earlier short film). He then directed three other feature films: Bar 51 (1985), Himmo, King of Jerusalem (1987), and Amazing Grace (1992).

Guttman was an openly gay man, and most of his films—except Himmo, King of Jerusalem, a film about the 1947–1949 Palestine war, based on a story by Yoram Kaniuk—explored aspects of life for LGBT individuals, including AIDS, which was the subject of his last film, Amazing Grace. Many Israeli actors made breakthrough performances in Guttman's films, including Jonathan Sagall, Alon Abutbul, Sharon Alexander, Aki Avni, and Rivka Michaeli.

Guttman was part of a group of young Israeli directors who called for quality films at the expense of commercial cinema. While he was an active director, He created a rich and stylish cinematic language, providing a unique sound. His films were notable for his attention to the visual and his distinct content.

== Death ==
Guttman died in Tel Aviv on 16 February 1993, of AIDS at the age of 38. He was buried at Kiryat Shaul Cemetery in Tel Aviv.

=== Legacy ===
Even after his death, Guttman remains among the most influential people in Israel’s LGBT community.

In 2013, the gay-themed drama film Snails in the Rain, directed by Yariv Mozer, was dedicated in Guttman's memory.

In 2024, Taboo, a documentary by Shauly Melamed about Guttman and his work was released.

== Filmography ==
=== Cinema ===
- Drifting (1975) - Short film
- Returning Premiers (1976) - Short film
- A Safe Place (1977) - Short film
- Drifting (1983)
- Bar 51 (1985)
- Himmo, King of Jerusalem (1988)
- Amazing Grace (1992)
