= List of films about the kibbutz =

This is a list of films and television series in which the Israeli kibbutz is prominently featured.

== Feature films ==
Made in Israel unless stated otherwise:

- Out of Evil (1959)
- Sallah Shabati (Hebrew: סאלח שבתי) (1964)
- Three Days and a Child (Hebrew: שלושה ימים וילד) (1967)
- An Intimate Story (Hebrew: סיפור אינטימי) (1981)
- Boy Meets Girl (Hebrew: בן לוקח בת) (1982)
- Noa at 17 (Hebrew: נועה בת 17) (1982)
- Atalia (Hebrew: עתליה) (1984)
- Goodbye, New York (1985) Israel & United States
- Not Quite Paradise (1985) United Kingdom
- Stalin's Disciples (Hebrew: ילדי סטאלין) (1986)
- Unsettled Land (Hebrew: החולמים) (1987)
- The Valley Train (Hebrew: רכבת העמק) (1989)
- Life According to Agfa (Hebrew: החיים על פי אגפא) (1992)
- No Names on the Doors (Hebrew: אין שמות על הדלתות) (1997)
- Operation Grandma (Hebrew: מבצע סבתא) (1999)
- No Longer 17 (Hebrew: לא בת 17) (2003)
- Walk on Water (Hebrew: ללכת על המים) (2004)
- The Galilee Eskimos (Hebrew: אסקימוסים בגליל) (2006)
- Sweet Mud (Hebrew: אדמה משוגעת) (2006)
- A Beautiful Valley (Hebrew: עמק תפארת) (2011)
- Kissufim (Hebrew: כיסופים) (2023)

== Documentaries ==
- Children of the Sun (Hebrew: ילדי השמש) (Israel, 2007)
- Degania: The First Kibbutz Fights Its Last Battle (Hebrew: הקרב האחרון על דגניה) (Israel, 2008)
- Inventing Our Life: The Kibbutz Experiment (US/Israel, 2010)
- Keeping the Kibbutz (US/Israel, 2010)
- Kibbutz (Hebrew: קיבוץ) (Israel, 2005)

== Television ==
- Barefoot (Hebrew: יחפים) (Israel, 2011)
