= Hefter =

Hefter is a surname. Notable people with the surname include:

- Alfred Hefter (1892–1957), Romanian poet, journalist, and writer of Jewish descent
- Gus Hefter (1873–1922), Australian rules footballer
- Richard Hefter (1941–2011), American writer

== See also ==
- 19423 Hefter
- Heffer (disambiguation)
