= List of Israeli films of 1981 =

A list of films produced by the Israeli film industry in 1981.

== 1981 releases ==
=== Unknown premiere date ===
| Premiere | Title | Director | Cast | Genre | Notes | Ref |
|---|---|---|---|---|---|---|
| ? | Lemon Popsicle III (Hebrew: אסקימו לימון 3 - שפשוף נעים) | Boaz Davidson | Yftach Katzur, Zachi Noy, Jonathan Sagall | Comedy, Romance | | |
| ? | Sheder Min Ha'Atid (Hebrew: שדר מן העתיד, lit. "Message from the Future") | David Avidan | | Drama, science fiction | | |
| ? | Ha-Ayit (Hebrew: העיט, lit. "The Eagle") | Yaky Yosha | Shraga Harpaz | Drama | | |
| ? | An Intimate Story (Hebrew: סיפור אינטימי) | Nadav Levitan | Chava Alberstein, Alexander Peleg, Dan Toren | Drama | | |
| ? | Messagest Hatzameret (Hebrew: מסג'יסט הצמרת, lit. "Top Masseur") | Alfred Steinhardt | Dubi Gal | Comedy, Drama | | |
| ? | Lo L'Shidur (Hebrew: לא לשידור, lit. "Not for Broadcast") | Yeud Levanon | Gila Almagor | Drama | | |
| ? | Ha-Ish She Ba Lakahat (Hebrew: האיש שבא לקחת, lit. "The Man Who Flew in to Grab") | Prosper Pariente | Ze'ev Revach | Drama | | |
| ? | Am Yisrael Hai (Hebrew: עם ישראל חי, lit. "Am Israel Chai") | Assi Dayan | Hanan Goldblatt | Drama | | |

== See also ==
- 1981 in Israel
