= List of Israeli films of 1997 =

A list of films produced by the Israeli film industry in 1997.

== 1997 releases ==
=== Unknown premiere date ===
Premiere	Title	Director	Cast	Genre	Notes	Ref
?	Overture 1812 (Hebrew: פתיחה 1812)	Menashe Noy	Ami Smolartchik, Tinkerbell, Juliano Mer, Keren Mor	Drama, Action, Comedy		
?	Campaign (Hebrew: קמפיין)	Shmuel Hasfari	Alon Aboutboul, Hana Azoulay-Hasfari, Shmil Ben Ari, Yisrael Poliakov	Drama		
?	Minotaur (Hebrew: מינוטאור)	Jonathan Tammuz	Mili Avital, Dan Turgeman, Georges Corraface	Romance, Thriller	Israeli-American co-production	
?	Mar Baum (Hebrew: מר באום, lit. "Mr. Baum")	Assi Dayan	Assi Dayan, Shira Geffen	Comedy, Drama		
?	Beep (Hebrew: ביפ)	Amit Hecht	Keren Mor, Menashe Noy, Dafna Rechter	Comedy, Drama		
?	Afula Express (Hebrew: עפולה אקספרס)	Julie Shles	Zvika Hadar, Esti Zakheim, Aryeh Moskona, Orli Perl	Comedy, Drama, Romance		
?	No Names on the Doors (Hebrew: אין שמות על הדלתות)	Nadav Levitan	Hava Alberstein, Mosko Alkalai, Avi Pnini	Drama		

== Awards ==
=== Ophir Award ===	=== Wolgin Award ===

== See also ==
- 1997 in Israel
