= 1995 in Israel =

- Decades: 1970s; 1980s; 1990s; 2000s; 2010s
- See also: History of Israel; Timeline of Israeli history; List of years in Israel

Events in the year 1995 in Israel.

== Incumbents ==
- President of Israel – Ezer Weizman
- Prime Minister of Israel – Yitzhak Rabin (Israeli Labor Party) until November 4, Shimon Peres (Israeli Labor Party)
- President of the Supreme Court – Meir Shamgar, Aharon Barak
- Chief of General Staff – Ehud Barak until January 1, Amnon Lipkin-Shahak
- Government of Israel – 25th Government of Israel until June 18, 26th Government of Israel

== Events ==
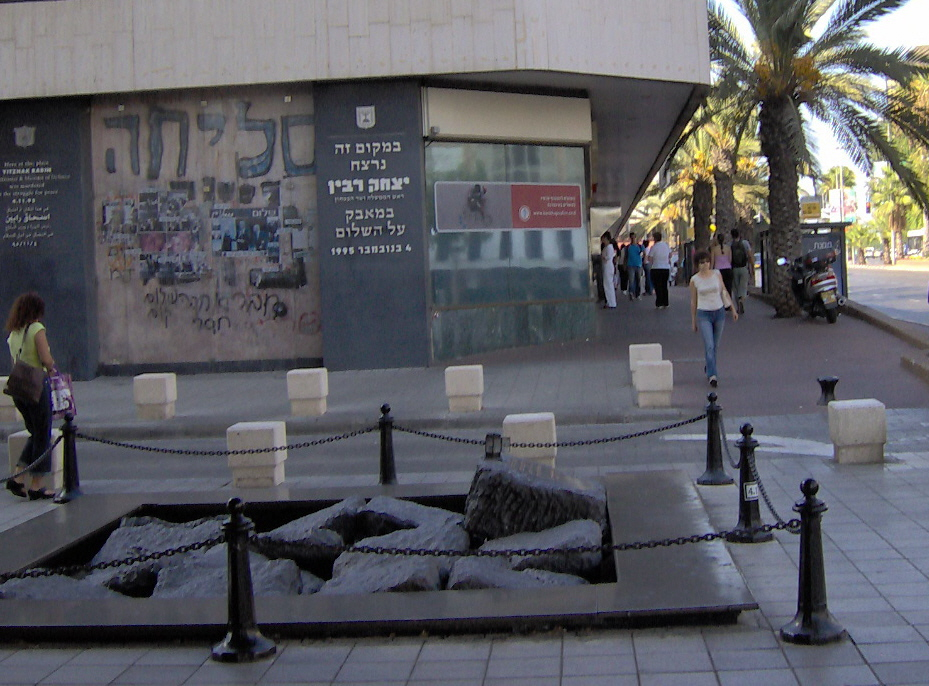
The monument at the site of the assassination of Yitzhak Rabin.

- January 1 – Amnon Lipkin-Shahak is appointed as the 15th Chief of Staff of the Israel Defense Forces.
- January 17 – One pilot killed in two IAF F-16 fighter planes colliding midair near the Palmachim Airbase.
- April 5 – The Israeli reconnaissance satellite Ofek-3 is launched.
- 13 May – Liora Fadlon represents Israel at the Eurovision Song Contest with the song “Amen”, achieving eighth place.
- July 18 - Three teenagers are crushed to death at the Arad Festival disaster.
- November 4 – Israeli Prime Minister Rabin is assassinated by right-wing Israeli radical Yigal Amir at a peace rally in Tel Aviv.
- November 8 – After a petition by Alice Miller, the Israeli Supreme Court rules that the Air Force must open its pilot training course to women.
- November 11 – Population Census: 5,548,523 inhabitants in Israel.
- November 22 – After serving as acting prime minister for 18 days, Shimon Peres presents his cabinet for a Knesset "Vote of Confidence". The 26th Government is approved that day, the members were sworn in and Peres begins his second term as Prime Minister of Israel.

=== Israeli–Palestinian conflict ===
The most prominent events related to the Israeli–Palestinian conflict which occurred during 1995 include:

- September 28 – The Interim Agreement on the West Bank and the Gaza Strip (also called the "Oslo II Agreement") is signed, which includes provision for the transfer of control of Bethlehem, Jenin, Nablus, Qalqilya, Ramallah, Tulkarm and some 450 villages to the Palestinian Authority.
- December 12 – The city of Nablus passes from Israeli to Palestinian Authority control.
- December 21 – The city of Bethlehem passes from Israeli to Palestinian Authority control.

Notable Palestinian militant operations against Israeli targets

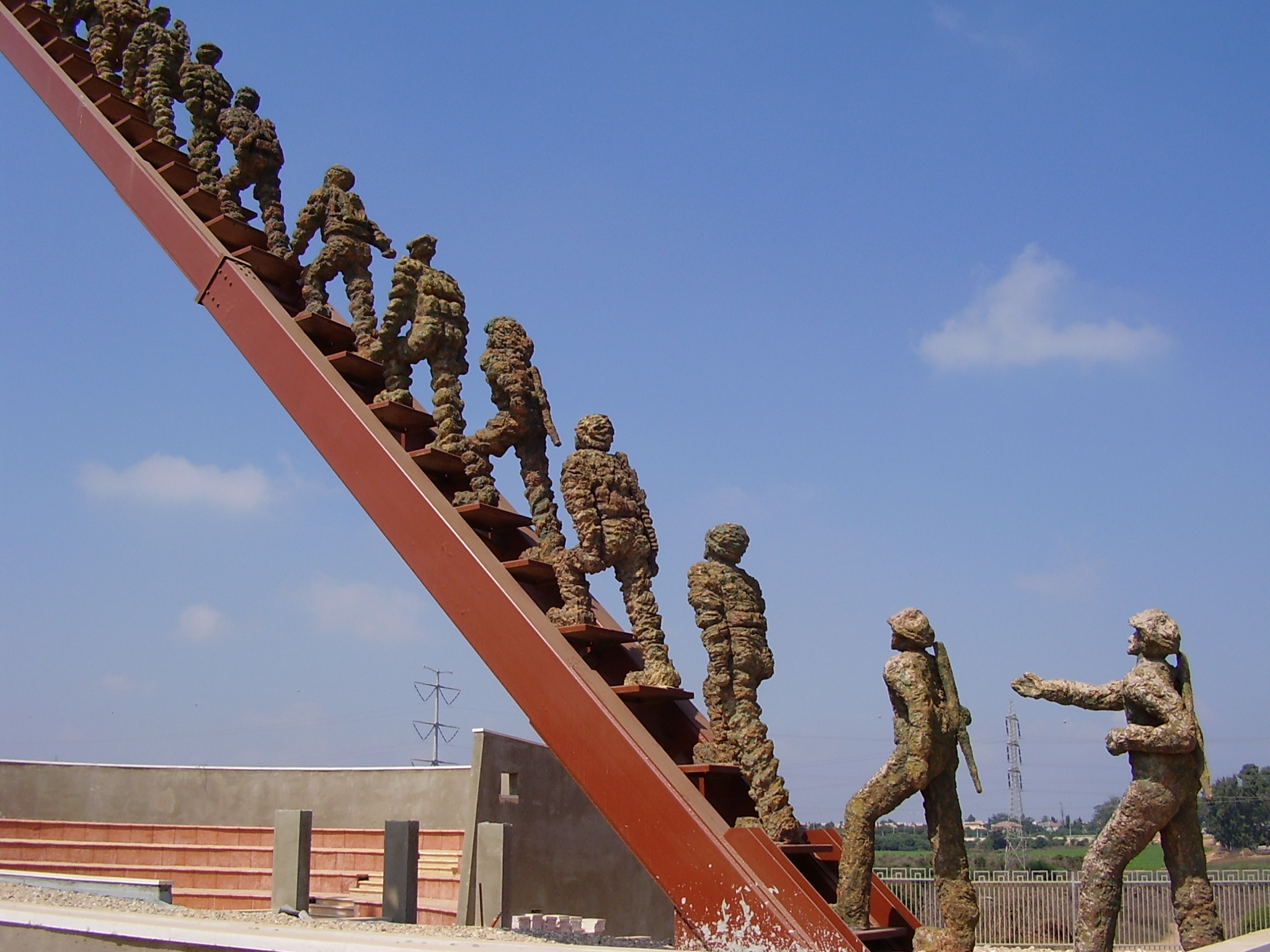
A monument commemorating the victims of the Beit Lid suicide bombing

The most prominent Palestinian militant acts and operations committed against Israeli targets during 1995 include:

- January 22 – 19 Israelis, mostly soldiers, are killed and 62 others are injured by two Palestinian suicide bombing attacks at the Beit Lid junction near Netanya. The Palestinian Islamic Jihad claim responsibility.
- April 9 – Kfar Darom bus attack
- July 24 – Ramat Gan bus bombing
- August 21 – Ramat Eshkol bus bombing

Notable Israeli military operations against Palestinian militancy targets
The most prominent Israeli military counter-terrorism operations (military campaigns and military operations) carried out against Palestinian militants during 1995 include:

- October 26 – Mossad agents assassinate Islamic Jihad leader Fathi Shikaki in his hotel in Malta.

== Notable births ==
- January 17 - Bisan Noor, footballer
- February 13 - Marsel Efroimski, chess player
- April 18 - Idan Zalmanson, basketball player
- May 11 – Shira Haas, actress
- June 15 - Itay Segev, basketball player
- July 9 – Yiftach Ziv, basketball player
- August 9 – Amit Rahav, actor
- October 21 - Ramzi Safouri, footballer

=== Full date unknown ===
- Bar Hefer, beauty pageant

== Notable deaths ==
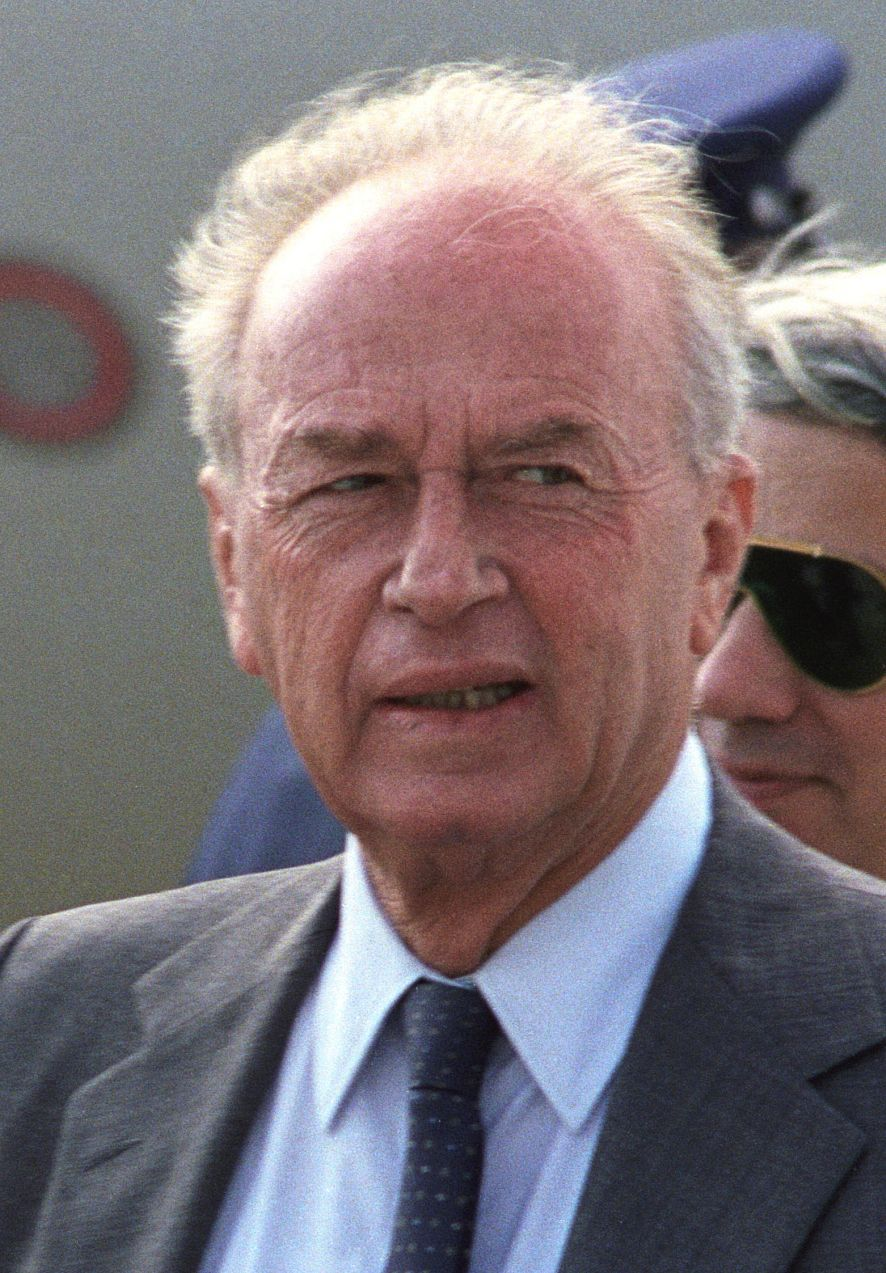
Yitzhak Rabin

- January 4 – Naomi Amir (born 1931), American-born Israeli neurologist.
- May 11 – David Avidan (born 1934), Israeli poet, painter, filmmaker, publicist and playwright.
- June 24 - Meir Zorea (born 1923), Israeli general politician.
- July 16 – Mordechai Gur (born 1930), Israeli politician and the 10th Chief of Staff of the IDF.
- August 5 – Menachem Avidom (b 1908), Austro-Hungarian (Galicia)-born Israeli composer.
- September 9 – Benjamin Mazar (born 1906), Russian (Poland)-born Israeli historian, archaeologist, and President of the Hebrew University of Jerusalem
- September 27 – Sasha Argov (born 1914), Russian-born Israeli composer.
- November 4 – Yitzhak Rabin (born 1922), Prime Minister of Israel, recipient of the Nobel Peace Prize.
- Full date unknown – Zvi Sliternik (born 1897), Austro-Hungarian (Podolia)-born Israeli entomologist.

== See also ==
- 1995 in Israeli film
