= Hefer =

Hefer is a surname. Notable people with the surname include:

- Bar Hefer (born 1995), Israeli beauty pageant winner
- Clyde Hefer (born 1961), Australian rower
- Haim Hefer (1925–2012), Polish-born Israeli songwriter, poet, and writer
- Joos Hefer (born 1931), South African judge

== See also ==
- Heifer
- Hepher
