= 1996 in Israel =

- Decades: 1970s; 1980s; 1990s; 2000s; 2010s
- See also: History of Israel; Timeline of Israeli history; List of years in Israel

Events in the year 1996 in Israel.

== Incumbents ==
- President of Israel – Ezer Weizman
- Prime Minister of Israel – Shimon Peres (Israeli Labor Party) until 18 June, Benjamin Netanyahu (Likud) starting 18 June
- President of the Supreme Court – Aharon Barak
- Chief of General Staff – Amnon Lipkin-Shahak
- Government of Israel – 26th Government of Israel until 18 June, 27th Government of Israel

== Events ==
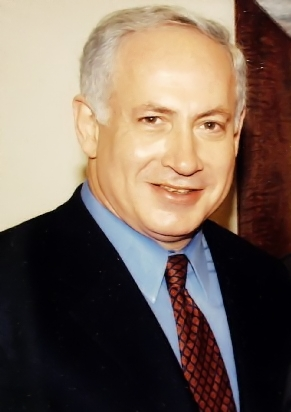
The Likud Party led by Benjamin Netanyahu wins a narrow victory in the Israeli general election

- 10 January – King Hussein of Jordan arrives for his first visit in Tel Aviv.
- 26 January – Israel gives $400,000 to the widow of a Moroccan waiter who was mistakenly identified as Ali Hassan Salameh and killed in Norway, 1973, in the Lillehammer affair.
- 19 February – Israel successfully test fires its Arrow-2 anti-ballistic missile.
- 27 March – Yigal Amir, assassin of Yitzhak Rabin, sentenced to life in prison.
- 28 March – Shamgar Commission report published.
- 11 April – Operation Grapes of Wrath: The Israeli government launches the Operation, consisting of massive attacks on Lebanon, in retaliation for prior terrorist attacks, and sparking off a violent series of retaliations.
- 13 April – Israeli helicopter fires rockets at an ambulance in Mansouri, Lebanon, killing 2 women and 4 children.
- 16 April – Israel strikes a civilian house in Nabatieh Fawka, Lebanon, killing 9 people, including 7 children.
- 18 April – Over a hundred Lebanese civilians who had taken refuge to escape the fighting are killed at the village of Qana when Israeli artillery shelled the area of a UN compound near Qana while firing at members of Hezbollah.
- 27 April – Operation Grapes of Wrath: The conflict de-escalated following a ceasefire agreement banning attacks on civilians.
- 30 May – The Likud Party, led by Benjamin Netanyahu, wins a narrow victory in the Israeli general election.
- 18 June – Prime Minister Benjamin Netanyahu presents his cabinet for a Knesset "Vote of Confidence". The 27th Government is approved that day and the members were sworn in.
- 5 November – Israeli Druze Azzam Azzam is arrested in Egypt on suspicion of spying for Israel. Later on, a military court in Cairo sentenced Azzam Azzam to 15 years imprisonment with hard labor.
- 30 December – Netanyahu proposed budget cuts, sparking protests from 250,000 workers, who went on strikes across Israel.

=== Israeli–Palestinian conflict ===
The most prominent events related to the Israeli–Palestinian conflict which occurred during 1996 include:

- 24 April – After a two-day meeting in Gaza City the PNC adopts two resolutions amending the PLO Charter.
- 24 September – Prime Minister Benjamin Netanyahu authorize the opening of an exit in the Arab Quarter of Jerusalem for the Western Wall Tunnel, which prior Prime Minister Shimon Peres had instructed to be put on hold for the sake of peace. This ignites violent riots over subsequent three days, killing 16 Israeli soldiers and about 60 Palestinians throughout the West Bank and northern Gaza Strip.

Notable Palestinian militant operations against Israeli targets

The most prominent Palestinian militant acts and operations committed against Israeli targets during 1996 include:

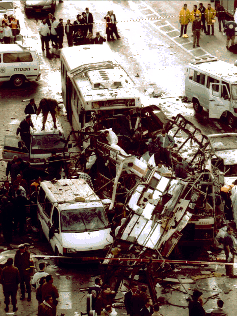
Aftermath of the Jaffa Road bus bombings. 26 people were killed in the Hamas suicide attack.

- 19 January – Three Hamas members are killed in an attack on an Israeli army roadblock. One Israeli soldier is injured.
- 25 February – Ashkelon bus station bombing. Killing two Israelis. Hamas claims responsibility for the bombing.
- 25 February – First Jerusalem bus 18 suicide bombing: A Hamas suicide bomber blows himself up in a commuter bus in Jerusalem, killing 26 and injuring 80 others.
- 3 March – Second Jerusalem bus 18 suicide bombing: A Hamas suicide bomber detonates a bomb on a bus in Jerusalem, killing 19 and injuring six others.
- 4 March – Dizengoff Center suicide bombing: A Hamas suicide bomber detonates a bomb outside the Dizengoff Center, Tel Aviv's largest shopping mall, killing 20 and wounding 75 others, including children celebrating the Jewish Purim holiday.
- 11 December – PFLP gunmen attack a car carrying Israeli settlers near the settlement of Bet El, killing a woman and her 12-year-old son.

Notable Israeli military operations against Palestinian militancy targets
The most prominent Israeli military counter-terrorism operations (military campaigns and military operations) carried out against Palestinian militants during 1996 include:

- 5 January – The Mossad assassinates Yahya Ayyash, the chief bombmaker of Hamas and the leader of the West Bank battalion of the Izz ad-Din al-Qassam Brigades, via a bomb-laden mobile phone.

=== Unknown dates ===
- Writing of A Clean Break: A New Strategy for Securing the Realm, suggestions about Israel's security problems prepared by Institute for Advanced Strategic and Political Studies for the Prime Minister of Israel.
- The founding of the community settlement Bat Hefer.
- The founding of the West Bank settlement of Modi'in Illit.
- The founding of the community settlement Tzukim.

== Notable births ==
- 11 May – Valeria Patiuk, Ukraine-born tennis player
- 2 September – Kobi Ifrach, Israeli bodybuilder

== Notable deaths ==
- 22 January – Israel Eldad (b. 1910), Austro-Hungarian (Galicia)-born Israeli independence fighter and Revisionist Zionist philosopher.
- 2 May – Emil Habibi (b. 1922), Israeli Arab author, Knesset member and public activist.
- 26 May – Haika Grossman (b. 1919), Polish-born Israeli politician and member of Knesset. Zionist leader in Europe, a partisan and a participant in the ghetto uprisings in Poland and Lithuania
- 27 August – Yair Rosenblum (b. 1944), Israeli composer.
- 25 December – Michael Bruno (b. 1932), German-born former governor of Israel's central bank and a Chief Economist of the World Bank.

== See also ==
- 1996 in Israeli film
- 1996 in Israeli television
- 1996 in Israeli music
- 1996 in Israeli sport
- Israel at the 1996 Summer Olympics
