= Sweet pickle =

A sweet pickle most commonly refers to a sweet-and-sour pickled cucumber. It may also refer to:

- Any sweet-and-sour pickled food, see pickling
- Branston pickle, a trade name for similar chutney-like condiments
- Sweet Pickles, a series of children's books
