= 1997 in Israel =

- Decades: 1970s; 1980s; 1990s; 2000s; 2010s
- See also: History of Israel; Timeline of Israeli history; List of years in Israel

Events in the year 1997 in Israel.

== Incumbents ==
- President of Israel – Ezer Weizman
- Prime Minister of Israel – Benjamin Netanyahu (Likud)
- President of the Supreme Court – Aharon Barak
- Chief of General Staff – Amnon Lipkin-Shahak
- Government of Israel – 27th Government of Israel

== Events ==
- 4 February – 1997 Israeli helicopter disaster: Two IAF troop-transport CH-53 Sea Stallion helicopters collide in darkness near the remote She'ar Yashuv kibbutz, in northern Israel, killing 77 IDF soldiers.
- 13 March – Island of Peace massacre: Seven 11-year-old girls from Beit Shemesh's Feurst School are killed and many other are severely injured by a Jordanian soldier, who opened fire on the schoolchildren while they were on a class trip at the "Island of Peace", a joint Israeli and Jordanian tourist resort, under Jordanian rule.
- July - The 1997 Maccabiah Games are held.
- 14 July – Maccabiah bridge collapse - A pedestrian bridge collapses over the Yarkon River killing four and injuring 60 Australian athletes who are visiting Israel to participate in the Maccabiah Games.
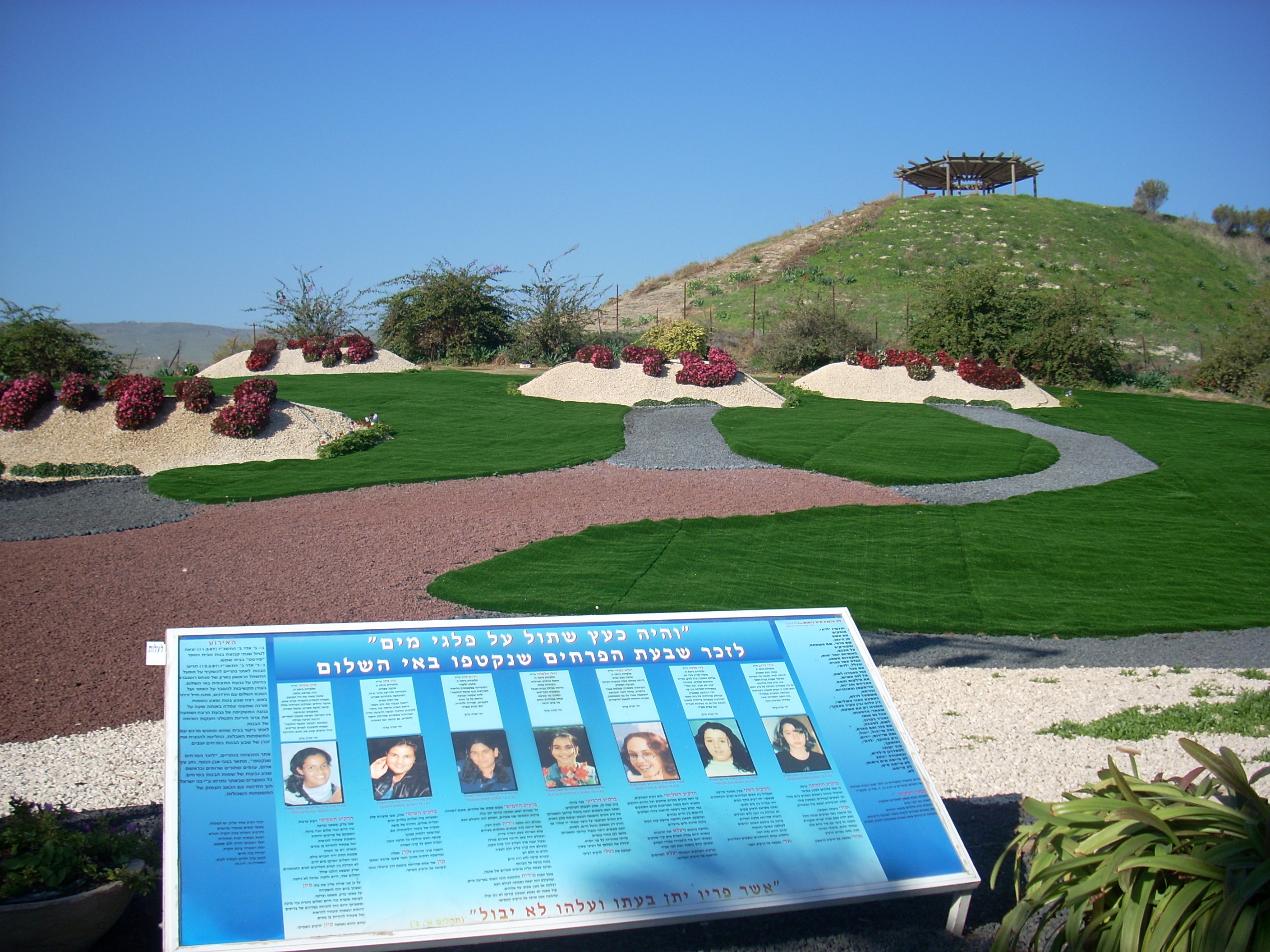
Peace Island memorial for the victims of the 1997 Peace Island massacre

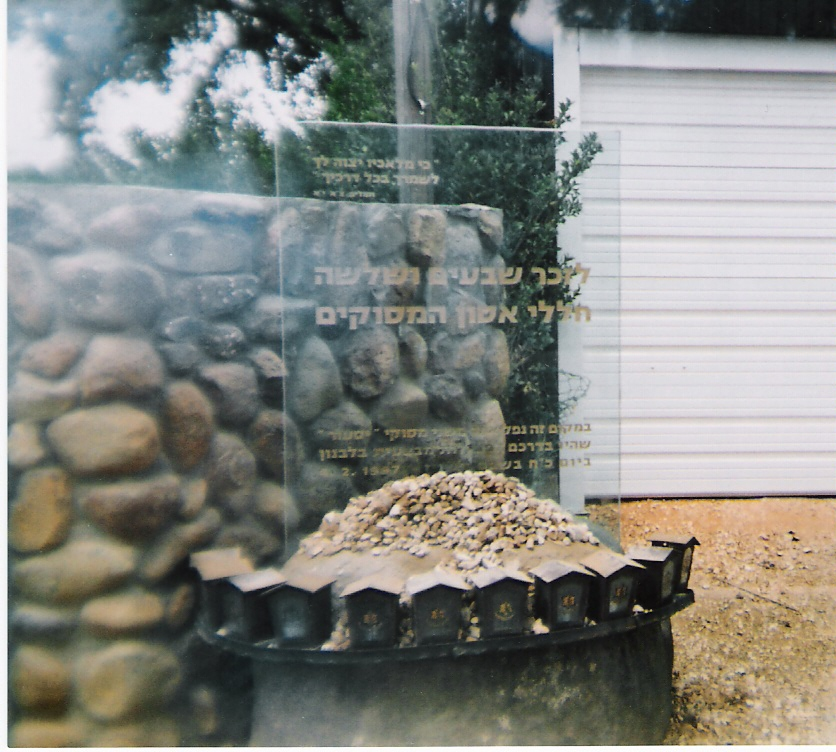
Monument for the 73 IDF soldiers killed in the 1997 Israeli helicopter disaster

=== Israeli–Palestinian conflict ===
The most prominent events related to the Israeli–Palestinian conflict which occurred during 1997 include:

- 14 January – The government of Israel approves the Hebron Agreement.
- 16 January – The Knesset approves the Hebron Agreement.

Notable Palestinian militant operations against Israeli targets

The most prominent Palestinian militant acts and operations committed against Israeli targets during 1997 include:

- 21 March – Café Apropo bombing: A Palestinian Arab suicide bomber kills three and injures 49 in a coffee shop in Tel Aviv.
- 30 July – 1997 Mahane Yehuda Market Bombings: 16 Israelis are killed and 178 wounded in two consecutive suicide bombings in the Mahane Yehuda Market in Jerusalem.
- 4 September – Ben Yehuda Street Bombing: Three Hamas suicide bombers simultaneously blow themselves up on the Ben Yehuda Street pedestrian mall in Jerusalem, killing five Israelis. The bombing was carried out by Palestinian Arabs from the village of Asira ash-Shamaliya.

Notable Israeli military operations against Palestinian militancy targets
The most prominent Israeli military counter-terrorism operations (military campaigns and military operations) carried out against Palestinian militants during 1997 include:

- 25 September – assassination attempt on Khaled Mashal: Two Mossad agents attempted to assassinate Khaled Mashal, the Hamas' Jordanian branch chief, in Jordan by injecting him a toxin in his ear. The operation failed after the Jordanian authorities managed to apprehend the two Mossad agents and later on, in exchange for their release, an Israeli physician had to fly to Amman and administer an antidote to Mashal. The fall out from the failed assassination eventually led to the release of Sheik Ahmed Yassin, the founder and spiritual leader of the Hamas movement, and scores of Hamas prisoners.

== Notable births ==
- 12 April – Marc Hinawi, swimmer
- 12 May – Odeya Rush, actress
- 16 June – Artem Dolgopyat, artistic gymnast

== Notable deaths ==
Chaim Herzog

- 4 April – Leo Picard (b. 1900), German-born Israeli geologist and an expert in the field of hydrology.
- 12 April – Nechama Leibowitz (b. 1905), Russian (Latvia)-born Israeli Bible scholar.
- 17 April – Chaim Herzog (b. 1918), British-born Israeli politician, the sixth president of Israel.
- 1 October – Inbal Perlmutter (b. 1971), Israeli musician.
- 2 December – Anat Elimelech (b. 1974), Israeli actress and model
- 17 December – Uzi Narkiss (b. 1925), distinguished Israeli general.

== See also ==
- 1997 in Israeli film
- 1997 in Israeli television
- 1997 in Israeli music
- 1997 in Israeli sport
