= List of Israeli films of 1995 =

A list of films produced by the Israeli film industry in 1995.

== 1995 releases ==
Premiere	Title	Director	Cast	Genre	Notes	Ref
September 3	Zihron Devarim (Hebrew: זיכרון דברים, lit. "Memorandum")	Amos Gitai	?	Drama	Israeli-French-Italian co-production	
September 8	Under the Domim Tree (Hebrew: עץ הדומים תפוס, lit. "The Domim Tree is taken")	Eli Cohen	Gila Almagor, Kaipu Cohen, Juliano Mer	Drama		
November 1	Lovesick on Nana Street (Hebrew: חולה אהבה בשיכון ג', lit. "Lovesick in Neighborhood Gimel")	Savi Gavison	Moshe Ivgy, Hana Azoulay-Hasfari	Comedy, Drama		
November 13	Leylasede (Hebrew: לילסדה)	Shemi Zarhin	Gila Almagor, Alon Aboutboul, Joseph Shiloach	Drama		

=== Unknown premiere date ===
Premiere	Title	Director	Cast	Genre	Notes	Ref
?	Smicha Hashmalit Ushma Moshe (Hebrew: שמיכה חשמלית ושמה משה, lit. "An Electric Blanket Named Moshe")	Assi Dayan	Rivka Neuman, Shmil Ben Ari, Uri Klauzner	Drama		
?	B'Shivim Ushtayim Lo Hayta Milhama (Hebrew: ב-72 לא הייתה מלחמה, lit. "In 72 there was no war")	Dudu Krainer	Adam Abulafia, Shmuel Edelman, Ava Haddad, Natali Atiya	Drama		
?	Tzaleket (Hebrew: צלקת, lit. "Scar")	Haim Bouzaglo	?	Drama		
?	All Hell Broke Loose	Amir Feldman		Documentary		
?	Baba Luba	Julie Shles	Danny Bassan	Documentary		

== Awards ==
=== Ophir Award ===	=== Wolgin Award ===

== See also ==
- 1995 in Israel
