= Video game packaging =

Physical storage of the contents of a video game

Video game packaging refers to the physical containers, protective materials, and promotional elements used to distribute, protect, and market video games, typically including boxes or cases, instruction manuals, shrink-wrap films, and artwork. Packaging for video games originated in the 1970s with the Atari 2600, which featured diverse and unregulated box and cartridge styles between publishers. Variations in box art presentation continued into the 1980s, when Nintendo's Nintendo Entertainment System was introduced. The release of the Game Boy introduced standardized packaging, which carried over into Nintendo's subsequent console libraries. Today, most physical game releases are shipped in (DVD & Blu-ray) keep cases or custom made cases as used for Nintendo Switch, Nintendo 3DS, PlayStation Vita, Xbox One and more, with little differences between them. (CD) jewel cases used to also be common but that have faded into obscurity due to modern games rarely releasing on CD.

Aside from the actual game, many items may be included inside, such as an instruction booklet, teasers of upcoming games, subscription offers to magazines, other advertisements, or any hardware that may be needed for any extra features of the game.

== Personal computer packages ==
Early machines such as the Commodore 64 were tape-based, and hence had their games distributed on ordinary cassettes. When more advanced machines moved to floppy disks, the cassette boxes stayed in use for a while (e.g. Treasure Island Dizzy for the Amiga came on a floppy disk in a cassette box).

In the late 1980s and early 1990s, computer games became significantly more complex, and the market for them expanded enormously. Possibly in an effort to occupy more shelf space than their rivals, and attract attention with their cover art, games began to be sold in large cardboard boxes. There was no standard size, but most were around 20 cm x 15 cm x 5 cm (around 8in x 6in x 2in). The greatly increasing box sizes may have been justified in some cases. Games such as flight simulators came with extremely large, thick manuals. Others came with elaborate copy-protection systems such as Zool's circular code wheel, or even a hardware dongle (although these were generally more common on expensive non-game software).

Variations on the "big box" format include a box within a sleeve, such as Unreal, and a box with a fold-out front cover, such as Black & White.

Games re-released as budget games usually came in much smaller boxes—a common format for Amiga budget games was a thin square box roughly 13 cm x 13 cm x 2 cm (roughly 5in x 5in x 1in). It was during this time that covermounting of cassettes and floppy discs became common.

As PC games migrated to CDs in jewel cases, the large format box remained, though to reduce printing costs, manuals came on the CD as well as with the CD (inside the front cover), as did many of the copy-protection techniques in the form of SafeDisc and SecuROM. Despite the CD jewel case format having been around since the invention of the music CD, very few full-price PC games were released in a jewel case only. A thicker variation with space for a thick manual was, however, used for most PlayStation and Dreamcast games.

Around 2000, PC game packaging in Europe began to converge with that of PS2 (and later, Xbox and GameCube) console games, in the keep case format in which to this day the vast majority of games are sold. These boxes are sometimes known as Amaray cases, after a popular manufacturer of them. In the U.S., most PC games continue to ship in plastic DVD cases or cardboard boxes, though the size of such boxes has been standardized to a small form factor. Special packages such as a "Collector's Edition" frequently still ship with oversized boxes, or those with a different material, such as a SteelBook.

In the U.S., the IEMA played a major role in improving, from a retailer's perspective, the way most PC games are packaged. In 2000, many retailers were becoming disenchanted with the salability of PC games as compared with their more profitable console game counterparts as products. Oversized software boxes were blamed for a lack of productivity per square foot (the profitability of a particular item sold at retail based upon its foot print). The IEMA worked with leading game publishers in creating the now-standard IEMA-sized box, essentially a double-thick DVD-sized plastic or cardboard box, which effectively increased the profitability per square foot by over 33% and appeased merchants and developers alike. Medal of Honor: Allied Assault was one of the first PC games in the U.S. to come packaged in this new standardized box.

In creating the new box size the IEMA found itself in the unlikely position of platform guardian (where each console platform had a first-party publisher to oversee standardization matters, PC games by their very nature did not). As such, the industry pressured the organization to develop a platform identification mark which would unify the display and focus the customer's brand perception. Again the IEMA worked with publishers to create a new standard "PC" icon, and would provide its use on a royalty-free basis to the industry.

In 2004, Half-Life 2 was released with a boxed retail presence, but required the game to be activated online through a proprietary service developed by Valve, Steam, which also sold the game directly to customers - bypassing the traditional brick-and-mortar publishing model. It was met with backlash initially, with many users feeling that it meant they did not really 'own' their game, and that it was a form of DRM that prevented reselling their titles second-hand. Digital distribution is now the most prominent and, for many titles, only method of distribution. Many boxed retail games as of 2021 contain only an activation code, in lieu of physical media.

Java games for cellphones are distributed almost exclusively via the internet. It is possible that the proliferation of home broadband will lead to electronic distribution for all games in the future, leaving physical packaging a niche market, though game developers cite the unsolved problem of digital rights management as the main barrier to this.

== Console packages ==
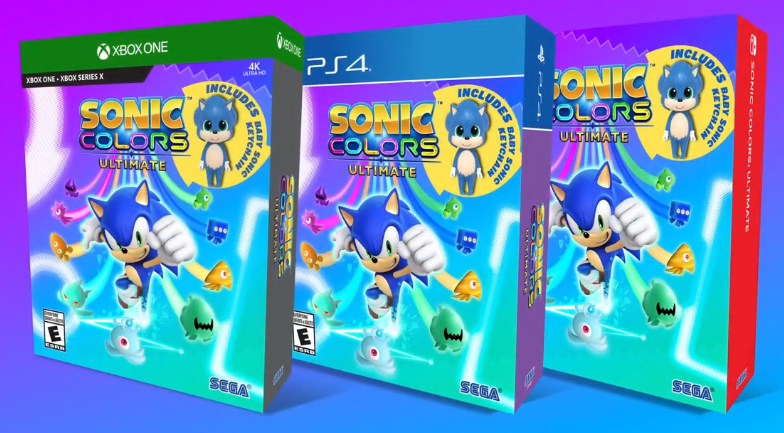
Examples of Sonic Colors Ultimate physical editions, with each having a different label to indicate the console. Left-right: Xbox One, PlayStation 4, Nintendo Switch

The earliest consoles had game cartridges; the Intellivision cartridge packaging featured a box color-coded to the "network" or category of the game (one of several themes, such as "action", "sports", etc.). The front cover opened up, book style; on the inner front cover, a slot retained the paper manual – a simple booklet, as well as the poly controller overlays. In the main confines of the box, a plastic tray was recessed into which the cartridge fit snugly. When other companies began to produce cartridges for Mattel's system, other types of boxes began to appear, such as Imagic's simple cardboard box, which opened from the top to reveal simple cardboard retainers for the cartridge and rules booklet.

Unlike PC games, console manufacturers charge a license fee to anyone developing for their machine, and exert a certain amount of influence in the style of packaging. Nintendo, for example, maintained almost completely standardized boxes for SNES games. PlayStation 2, GameCube, and Xbox game boxes also conform to the keep case form factor.

All cases of PAL region games for PlayStation and Dreamcast are thicker than standard North American and Japanese CD-cases. This is due to thicker manuals that often include many European languages. An exception to this were Australian-market PlayStation games later in the console's life, which were released in standard-sized jewel cases with the manual in English only.

Games for handheld systems are usually packaged in smaller boxes, to match the portable nature of the machine. The Game Boy Advance's cardboard boxes are a little smaller than SNES/N64 packaging, and games for the Nintendo DS and PSP both come in smaller, CD-like cases.

While DVD-like boxes are common in the current generation of gaming, the original cardboard packaging used for past cartridge-based games is scarce, as they were often discarded by the original owner of the game. As such, many cartridge-based games bought in second hand markets often are missing their original boxes, and the boxes themselves are now viewed as collector items.

PlayStation 3, PlayStation 4, PlayStation 5, Xbox One, and Xbox Series X/S games are packaged into Blu-ray keep cases. With some generations, standardized colors have been used for the edging.

Third	Nintendo Entertainment System		Atari 7800	Sega Master System	ZX Spectrum	Commodore 64	Amstrad CPC	BBC Micro
Fourth	Super Nintendo		TurboGrafx-16	Sega Mega Drive				
Fifth	Nintendo 64		PlayStation	Sega Saturn				
Sixth	GameCube	PlayStation 2	Xbox	Dreamcast				
Seventh	Wii		PlayStation 3	Xbox 360				
Eighth	Wii U	Nintendo Switch	PlayStation 4	Xbox One				
Ninth	Nintendo Switch 2		PlayStation 5	Xbox Series X				

== Box art ==
Softline play testers have rigorously examined all the rooms in the game, the program code, the documentation, and the protection scheme, and have, as yet, been unable to find evidence of one naked woman tied to a pole. In fact, we could find no women at all, even clothed. No snakes, either.

— Softline, January 1983, mocking the "visually striking" but misleading cover art of Brian Fargo's Demon's Forge

The term box art (also called a game cover or cover art) can refer to the artwork on the front of PC or console game packaging. Box art is usually flashy and bombastic, in the vein of movie posters, and serves a similar purpose. Additionally, screenshots on the back of the box often mix in-game sequences with pre-rendered sections. Historically, art featured on the box has been in excess of what the computer or console was technically capable of displaying. Veteran San Francisco box art illustrator Marc Ericksen, who produced nearly 100 illustrations for video games from 1982 to 2003, including games like Tengen's Tetris, Capcom's Mega Man 2, Atari 7800's Galaga, Data East's Bad Dudes, and SNK's Guerrilla War contends that there was very little in the screen graphics to sell the games. The sales arms needed illustrations to introduce a visual construct to acquaint young gamers to the gameplay concepts. The graphics were exciting when in motion, but offered very little to engage a prospective purchaser's attention when static.

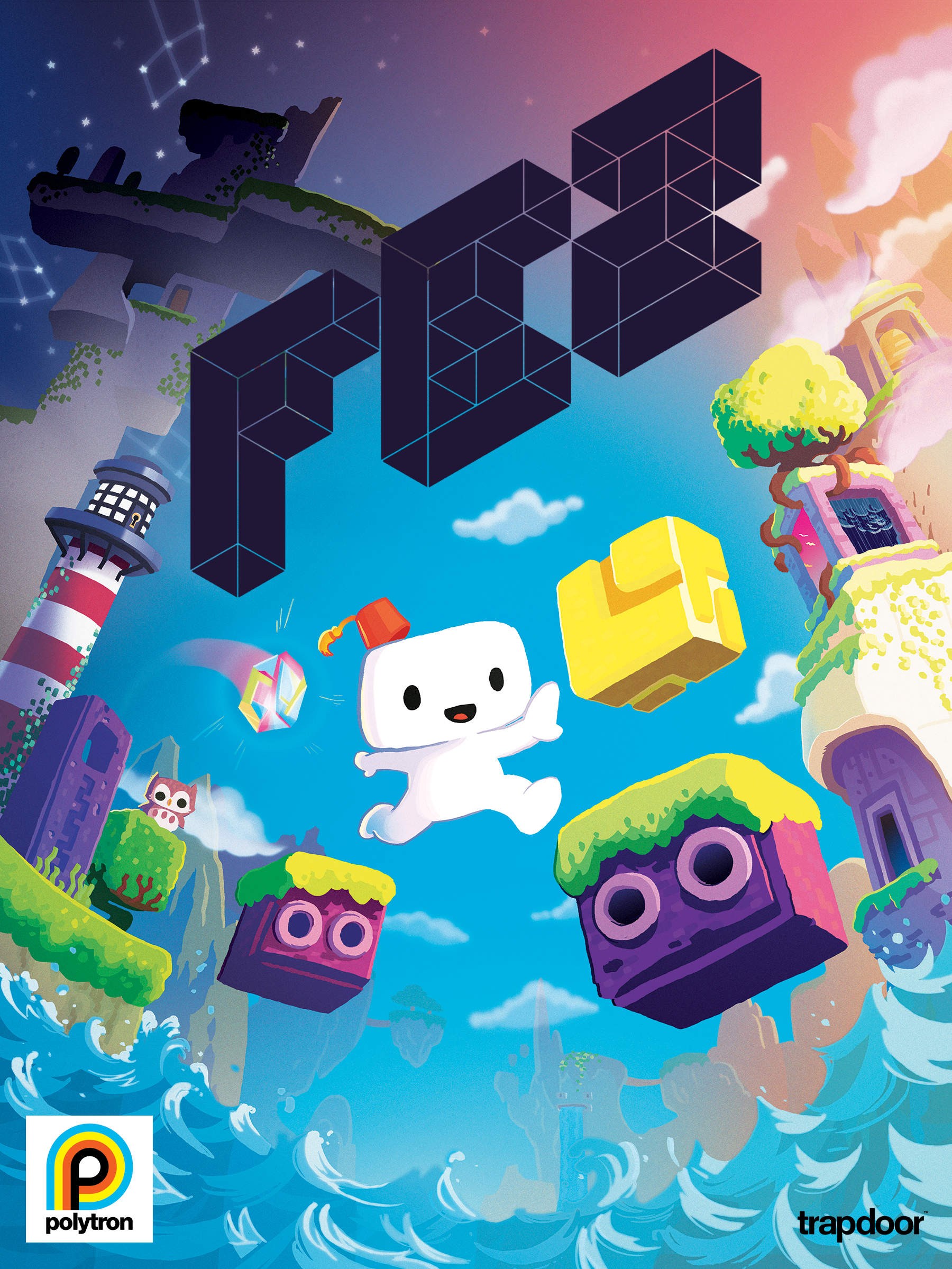
The cover art of Fez

Illustrators were less frequently required beyond the year 2000, when screen graphics reached parity with illustrations and could be utilized as cover art.

Box art may misleadingly depict gameplay. Weekly Reader Software in 1983 advertised Old Ironsides with the slogan "What you see is what you get!", promising that "Unlike other programs, where the pictures on the packaging and in the advertising bear no resemblance to the screen images, this program delivers precisely what's promised ... Better than arcade-quality graphics and sound!". Cinemaware advertised Defender of the Crown in 1987 with screenshots that the company described as being an "Actual Atari ST screen!", "Actual Apple IIGS screen!", "Actual Macintosh screen!", and "Actual Commodore 64 screen!". Deceptions continued, however; Computer Gaming World in 1994 stated that "Careful consumers have learned to spot screen shots on a box that are probably just animation sequences, not really a play shot".

On the cover, many things are listed, such as the name and logo of the game, what platform the game is for, the rating (ESRB for North America, PEGI for Europe, Australian Classification Board for Australia, and CERO for Japan), logo of the publisher and/or developer, and quotes from magazines or websites.

As part of the marketing effort to build hype, box art is usually released a few months before the actual game.

Many people find particular box art strange, or poor, such as Phalanx and Mega Man. Often this is the result of art used for a localized version of an import title. Many early releases, especially Nintendo, replaced Japanese art with original US artwork, such as the Dragon Warrior and the Final Fantasy series. Recent import titles have made it a habit to retain the original cover art.

The boxes of Nintendo games (NES, Game Boy, Nintendo 64, GameCube, Nintendo DS, Wii, Nintendo 3DS, Wii U, Nintendo Switch and Nintendo Switch 2) from some PAL territories all have a small coloured triangle on their spines, but in each territory it is a different colour (to show the region that copy of the game came from). Some common ones are: Green = UK, Pink = Spain, Red = France, Light Blue = Italy, Dark Blue = Germany, Brown = Australia. There are 49 different colours. As well as geographic region it also has to do with the language of the box art and booklets; though PAL region Nintendo games are made in Germany, the triangles show the region that the game is shipped to.

== Instruction manuals ==
Like most players, I boot a game and start playing it before I even look at the manual

— Compute!, March 1988

An instruction manual, a booklet that instructs the player on how to play a game, is usually included as part of a video game package. Manuals can be large, such as the Civilization II manual which runs hundreds of pages, or small, such as the single sheet of double-sided A5 paper included with Half-Life 2.

PAL region versions of games may include thick manuals with many languages. For example, the European manual of Crash Bandicoot 3: Warped for PlayStation includes six languages: English, French, German, Italian, Spanish and Dutch.

=== Personal computers ===
Computer games typically have larger manuals because some genres native to personal computers such as simulators or strategy games require a more in-depth explanation of the interface and game mechanics. Furthermore, instruction manuals for personal computer games tend to include installation instructions to assist a user in installing the game, but those instructions could also appear in a separate piece of paper or in a different leaflet. As some of these manuals are so large as to be cumbersome when searching for a specific section, some games include a quick reference card (usually a list of keyboard commands) on a separate sheet of paper or in the back cover of the manual.

A common use for printed manuals was to use it as a copy protection device: some games required the player to find the "word x in the y^{th} paragraph of the z^{th} page" or to input a code found in the borders of a certain page. These mechanisms were highly unpopular, as they only affected legitimate purchasers; pirates would simply use a crack or have the codes printed on a single sheet to bypass the mechanism. While this practice has fallen out of use since the CD-ROM became the main medium for games, CD-keys serve a similar purpose and are occasionally printed somewhere in or on the manual.

Other manuals go much farther than being simple guides: some games based on historical or well-developed fictional stories often include extensive information about the settings, like the WWI combat simulator Flying Corps, where every campaign was thoroughly described with historical information. In some genres, this led to the aforementioned large manuals traditional with computer games.

=== Decline of printed manuals ===
The trend in recent years is towards smaller manuals – sometimes just a single instruction sheet – for a number of reasons. Console games are no longer sold in large cardboard boxes; instead, since the early 2000s, DVD cases have been used (as today's major disc-based consoles use Blu-Ray discs which are DVD-sized optical discs), which leave no room for a large manual. Printing is also expensive, and game publishers can save money by including a PDF of the manual on the disc (for PC games). Notably, most video games produced during and after the fourth generation include in-game instructions via tutorials and other such methods, meaning printed manuals are often overlooked. Valve's Half-Life 2 is an early example of a game that did not come with a manual. Environmental concerns have been used as a reason publishers stopped including printed manuals with their games. One example is Ubisoft, which phased out printed manuals starting in March 2010 with their PC games and the following April with their PlayStation 3 and Xbox 360 titles, starting with Shaun White Skateboarding. Electronic Arts did the same for similar reasons starting with the PS3 version of Mass Effect 2 and all versions of Fight Night Champion. However, this trend is criticized among many video game collectors because it may decrease the perceived value of a game, as manuals are sometimes considered works of art themselves as an essential part of the game's packaging.

As opposed to most console games which have printed manuals, games for the Nintendo 3DS, Wii U, and Nintendo Switch store manuals in digital form on the Nintendo 3DS game card, Wii U optical disc, and Nintendo Switch game card, respectively.

=== Missing manuals ===
While their use in PC games post-2000 is scarce, console games and older PC games are expected to have them. Games acquired in second-hand markets often miss the manuals, much like missing their original boxes, after being kept, lost or discarded by their previous owners. As occasionally the manuals are part of the game experience, owners of games missing manuals try to find replacements in other second-hand stores or with other players or collectors. Alternatively, sites like Replacementdocs provide a large repository of fan-made and official PDF manuals to download. Those range from simple page scans (which is impractical in longer manuals, due to larger file size and the inability to search text) to OCR-scanned and carefully assembled manuals to remain as close to the original manuals as possible.

=== MMORPG manuals ===
MMORPGs in particular continue to be packaged with a comprehensive and high-quality manual. World of Warcraft and Guild Wars include instruction manuals that are 150 to 200 pages; they explain everything from in-game lore to detailed overviews of the different character classes. In general, MMORPGs have a larger variety of features in which the player can focus on while playing than normal games and often take much longer to semi-complete (usually defined as reaching the highest-possible character level: due to the nature of MMORPG games, with constant content additions, etc., requiring many hours of weekly play in order to stay competitive in-game, it is impossible to ever "complete", "finish" or "beat" one in the traditional sense one can complete a game like Final Fantasy X or Rome: Total War). The detailed instruction booklets that accompany the games help answer any questions that players may have in order to make public relations and technical support easier once the game is released. These manuals also invite potential players to explore an aspect of the game that was previously unknown to them. More than any other genre, the community and longevity of an MMO are important to the developers because they often charge a monthly fee for playing the game.

=== Archival efforts ===
There have been efforts to archive older manuals of out-of-print video games for various consoles. For instance, a complete set of manuals (including variations) for USA-region PlayStation 2 games has been archived by a preservationist under the name of Kirkland in October 2022 and uploaded via the Internet Archive. The manuals themselves were scanned from the originals at a much higher resolution of 4K.
