= List of Israeli films of 1998 =

A list of films produced by the Israeli film industry in 1998.

== 1998 releases ==
Premiere	Title	Director	Cast	Genre	Notes	Ref
1 March	Dangerous Acts (Hebrew: מסוכנת)	Shemi Zarhin	Gila Almagor, Natan Datner, Moshe Ivgy, Dror Keren	Thriller		
2 September	Yom Yom (Hebrew: יום יום, lit. "Day after day")	Amos Gitai	Moshe Ivgy, Hanna Meron, Juliano Mer, Dalit Kahan	Drama	Israeli-French co-production	
26 November	Circus Palestine (Hebrew: קרקס פלשתינה lit. Zirkus Palestina)	Eyal Halfon	Yoram Hattab, Jenya Dodina	Drama		

=== Unknown premiere date ===
Premiere	Title	Director	Cast	Genre	Notes	Ref
?	Tzedek muchlat (Hebrew: צדק מוחלט, lit. "Absolute justice")	Arnon Zadok	Gabi Amrani, Yona Atari, Saar Badishi, Shmil Ben Ari	Drama		
?	Aviv (Hebrew: אביב)	Nadav Levitan	Tchelet Semel	Drama		
?	Buzz (Hebrew: באזז)	Eli Cohen	Sharon Zur, Itzik Atzmon, Ahuva Keren, Yuval Segal	Drama		
?	Pa'amaim Buskila (Hebrew: פעמיים בוסקילה, lit. "Buskila Twins")	Jacob Kotzky and Ze'ev Revach	Ze'ev Revach	Comedy		
?	Super Boy (Hebrew: סופר בוי)	Hanoch Rosen	Tom Avni	Adventure, Comedy, Thriller		
?	The Legend of the Silent Man (Hebrew: אגדת האיש ששתק)	Doron Nesher	Shmil Ben Ari, Dorin Caspi	Drama		

== Awards ==
=== Ophir Award ===	=== Wolgin Award ===

== See also ==
- 1998 in Israel
