= Chivalry (disambiguation) =

Chivalry is the traditional code of conduct associated with the medieval institution of knighthood.

Chivalry may also refer to:

== Games ==
- Chivalry (board game), a strategy board game
- Chivalry (1983 video game), a 1983 video game
- Chivalry: Medieval Warfare, a 2012 video game
- Chivalry 2, the 2021 video game sequel

== Other uses ==
- SS Chivalry, a British freighter
- "Chivalry", a short story by Neil Gaiman
- Chivalry (TV series), a British TV series
- Chivalry of a Failed Knight, A 2013 Light Novel Series

== See also ==
- Cavalry, soldiers or warriors who fight mounted on horseback
