= 1998 in Israel =

- Decades: 1970s; 1980s; 1990s; 2000s; 2010s
- See also: History of Israel; Timeline of Israeli history; List of years in Israel

Events in the year 1998 in Israel.

== Incumbents ==
- President of Israel – Ezer Weizman
- Prime Minister of Israel – Benjamin Netanyahu (Likud)
- President of the Supreme Court – Aharon Barak
- Chief of General Staff – Amnon Lipkin-Shahak until 9 July, Shaul Mofaz
- Government of Israel – 27th Government of Israel

== Events ==
- 19 January – The first two F-15I Ra’am planes landed in Hatzerim Airbase on January 19, 1998, and an audience of 3,000 had gathered at the base to watch the arrival of Heyl Ha’avir's most advanced fighters
- 22 January – The launch of the Israeli reconnaissance satellite Ofek-4 fails.
- 1 April – The Azrieli Center complex of skyscrapers officially opens, becoming the tallest building in Israel (Azrieli Center Circular Tower stands at 187 m).
- 9 May – Dana International wins first place for Israel at the Eurovision Song Contest with the song “Diva”. This was the third time that Israel won Eurovision.
- 9 July – Shaul Mofaz, is appointed as the 16th Chief of Staff of the Israel Defense Forces. He continued to serve as Chief of Staff during the Second Intifada.
- 26 November – Miss Israel, Linor Abargil, wins the title of Miss World 1998.
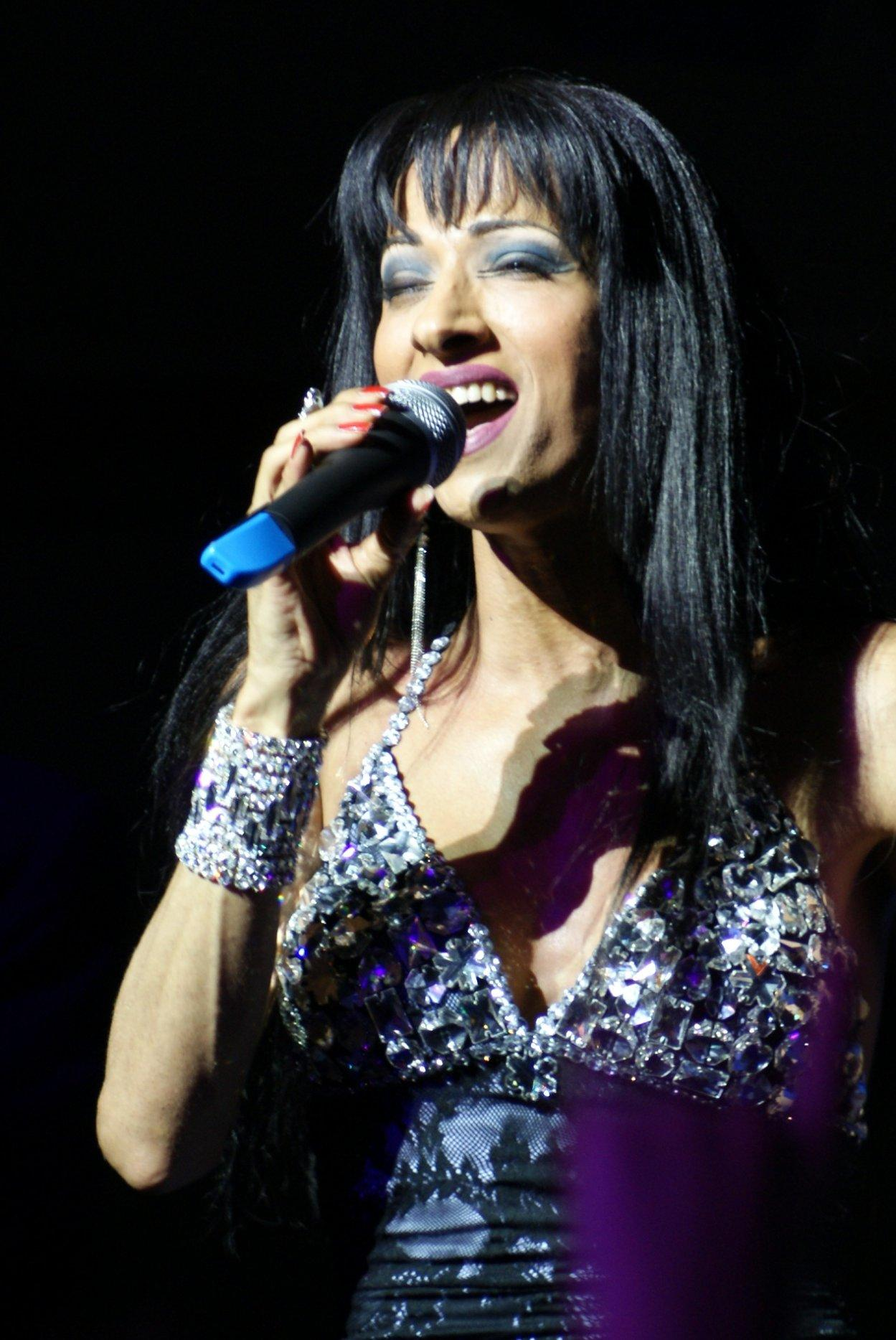
Dana International wins the Eurovision Song Contest

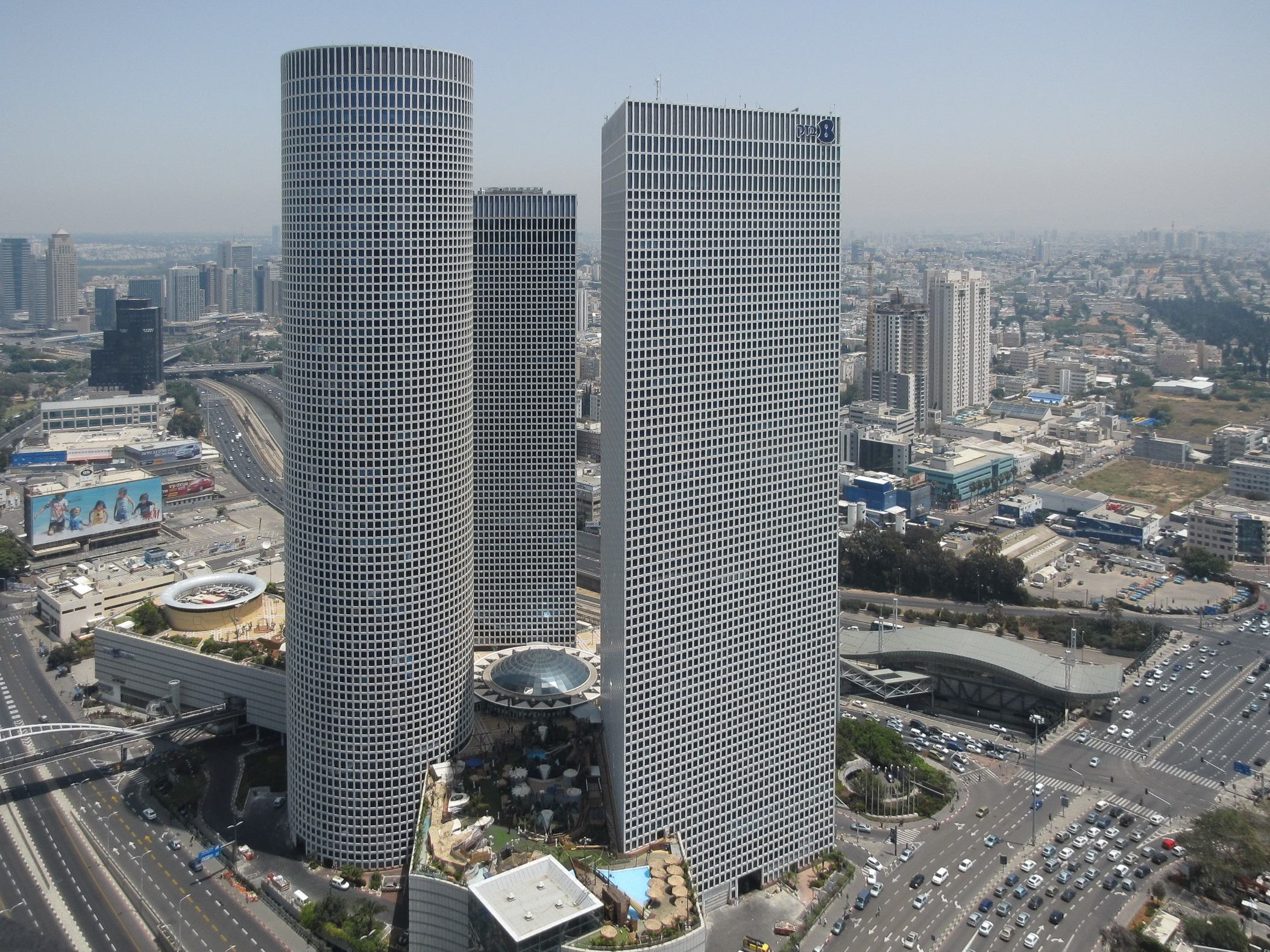
The Azrieli Center complex of skyscrapers officially opens, becoming the tallest building in Israel (Azrieli Center Circular Tower stands at 187 m).

=== Israeli–Palestinian conflict ===
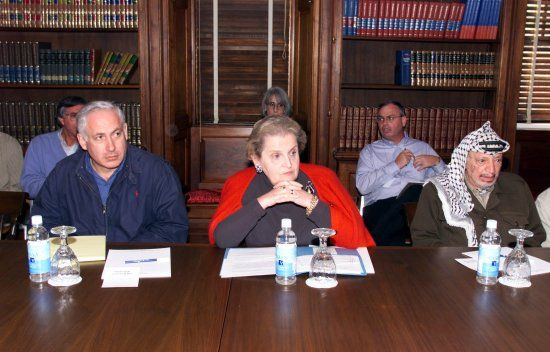
Prime minister Benjamin Netanyahu sitting with Madeleine Albright and Yassir Arafat at the Wye River Memorandum, 16 October 1998

The most prominent events related to the Israeli–Palestinian conflict which occurred during 1998 include:

- 23 October – Benjamin Netanyahu and Yasser Arafat sign the Wye River Memorandum which details the steps to be taken by the Israeli government and the Palestinian Authority to implement the earlier Interim Agreement of 1995.

Notable Palestinian militant operations against Israeli targets

The most prominent Palestinian militant acts and operations committed against Israeli targets during 1998 include:

- 29 October – Kfar Darom bombing
- 6 November – Jerusalem bombing

Notable Israeli military operations against Palestinian militancy targets

The most prominent Israeli military counter-terrorism operations (military campaigns and military operations) carried out against Palestinian militants during 1998 include:

=== Unknown dates ===
- The founding of the community settlement Ahuzat Barak.

== Notable births ==
- 5 March – Noam Bettan, singer
- 13 June – Abdallah El Akal, actor
- 2 November – Nadav Guedj, singer

== Notable deaths ==
- 20 January – Zevulun Hammer (b. 1936), Israeli politician.
- 10 March – Rabbi Hayim David HaLevi (b. 1924), Chief Rabbi of Tel Aviv.
- 14 May – Yitzhak Modai (b. 1926), Israeli politician.
- 16 May – Idov Cohen (b. 1909), Romanian-born Israeli politician.
- 20 May – Jacob Katz (b. 1904), Hungarian-born Israeli historian.
- 13 June – Nisim Aloni (b. 1926), Israeli playwright.
- 13 July – Ben Zion Abba Shaul (b. 1924), Israeli Sephardic rabbi.
- 29 September – Nechama Hendel (b. 1936), Israeli singer, actress, guitarist and entertainer.

== Major public holidays ==
- Passover (Pesach): April 10–17
- Yom HaShoah (Holocaust Remembrance Day): April 22
- Yom HaZikaron (Memorial Day): April 30
- Yom HaAtzmaut (Independence Day): April 30
- Shavuot: May 30–31
- Rosh Hashanah (Jewish New Year): September 20–22
- Yom Kippur (Day of Atonement): September 29–30
- Sukkot: October 4–11
- Hanukkah: December 14–21.

== See also ==
- 1998 in Israeli film
- 1998 in Israeli television
- 1998 in Israeli music
- 1998 in Israeli sport
- Israel in the Eurovision Song Contest 1998
- Israel at the 1998 Winter Olympics
