= Ezra Dotan =

Israeli fighter pilot (1937–1981)

- Born: Ezra Zandman; 25 September 1937; Free City of Danzig
- Died: 16 May 1981 (aged 43); Israel
- Military career
- Allegiance: Israel
- Branch: Israeli Air Force
- Service years: 1955–1981
- Rank: Aluf mishne (Colonel)
- Nicknames: "Mr. Skyhawk", "Beben"
- Units: 117 Squadron; 109 Squadron
- Commands: 109 Squadron; Lod Airbase
- Battles and wars: Arab–Israeli conflict; Six-Day War; War of Attrition; Yom Kippur War

Colonel Ezra Dotan (Hebrew: עזרא דותן; 25 September 1937 – 16 May 1981) was an Israeli Air Force (IAF) officer and a fighter ace credited with five victories.

== Early life ==
Dotan was born on 25 September 1937 in Danzig as Ezra Zandman. In 1940, following the outbreak of World War II, he immigrated with his parents to Mandatory Palestine but was deported by the British authorities to Mauritius, where he attended elementary school. He returned to Mandatory Palestine in 1945 and settled in Nahariya, where he completed his elementary education. He later studied at the Air Force Technical School in Haifa and was a member of the Israel Aviation Club during his youth.

== Military career ==
He enlisted in the Israel Defense Forces (IDF) in May 1955 and volunteered for a flight course, which he completed in 1957. He was assigned to the 117 Squadron, where he flew the Mirage IIIC and was recognized as a skilled pilot. On 7 April 1967, during a cross-border battle between Israel and Syria, Dotan shot down one Syrian Air Force MiG-21 that then crashed on Jordanian soil while the remainder of the Israeli formation shot down five more MiG-21s without any losses on their side. Following the start of the Six-Day War on 5 June, he shot down another Syrian MiG-21, his second aerial victory. On 7 June, Dotan was part of a strike formation targeting the H-3 Air Base in Iraq. During the mission, two Israeli Vautour aircraft and a Mirage IIIC were shot down, while Dotan managed to down one Iraqi Air Force Hawker Hunter while his wingman David Porat downed another. Returning to Ramat David Airbase at 14:01 where they refueled and rearmed, Dotan and Porat departed towards H-3 to locate the downed Israeli pilots. Unable to locate the downed jets, Dotan and Porat strafed H-3 and elements of the Iraqi expeditionary force before heading back to Ramat David. On their way back to the base, Dotan's Mirage was struck by an Israeli anti-aircraft missile after the Israeli ground control intercept mistook Dotan and Porat, who were tracked by the intercept, along with two Syrian MiG-21s chasing them, as hostile forces. Dotan managed to outmaneuver the MiG-21s and land his damaged Mirage safely at a general aviation airfield in Megiddo.

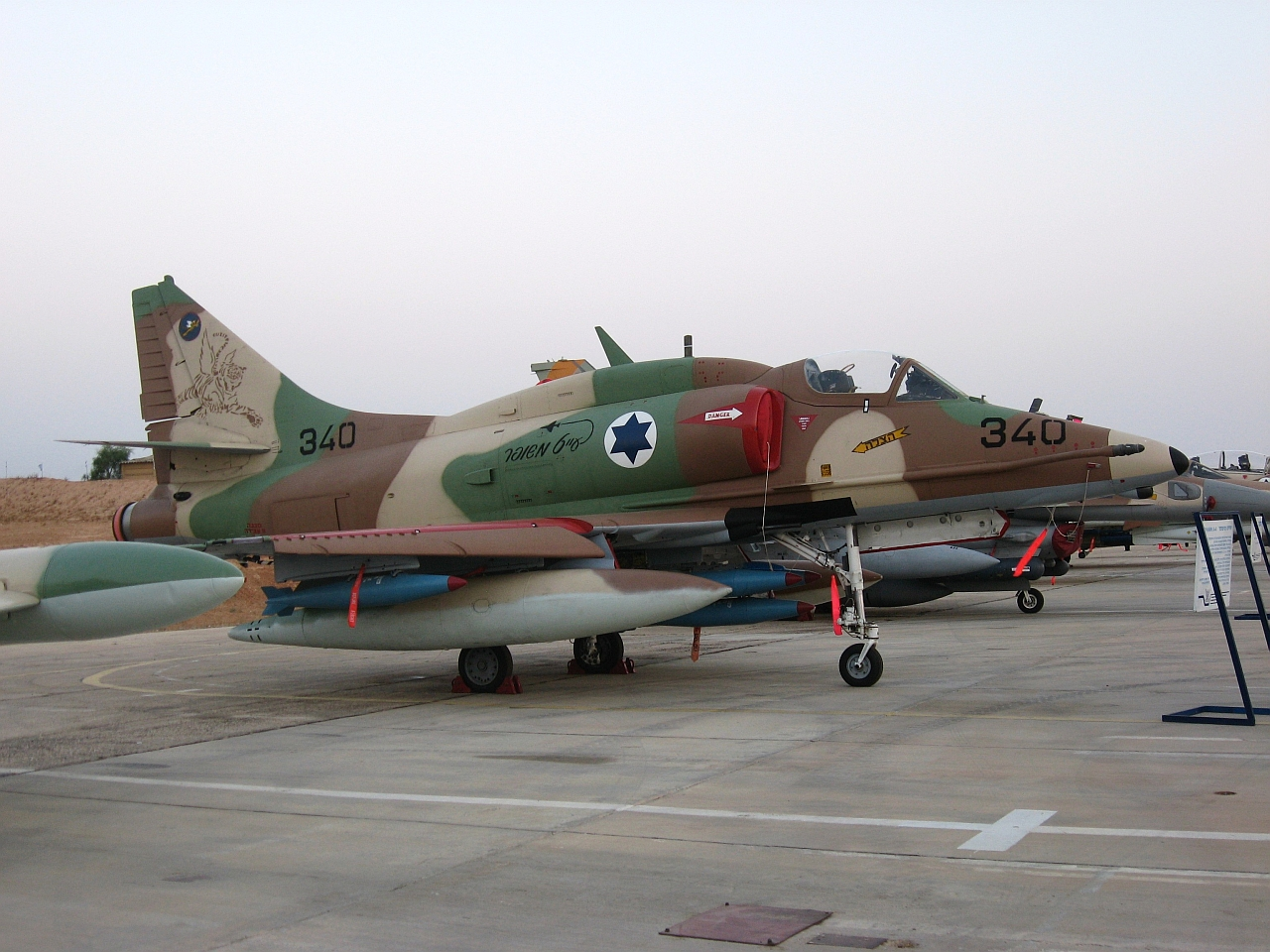
Israeli Air Force A-4 Skyhawk

He later transitioned to the Douglas A-4 Skyhawk and became commander of the 109 Squadron. During the War of Attrition, Dotan led numerous strike missions. On 12 May 1970, Dotan's squadron flew strikes in support of Operation Cauldron 2, which saw Israeli Air Force supporting Israeli Ground Forces in their efforts to destroy Palestinian Liberation Organisation (PLO) strongholds in the eastern areas of Southern Lebanon. While patrolling the area, Dotan and his wingman Giora Ben-Dov spotted four low-flying aircraft later identified as Syrian MiG-17s. Although IDF controllers initially misidentified the aircraft as friendly, Ben-Dov confirmed they were hostile and Dotan chose to engage the MiG-17s. Although Mirage fighters on combat air patrol offered assistance, Dotan asserted control over the engagement, intent on handling the threat by himself. Despite this, Mirage pilot Asher Snir flew towards the MiG-17s and downed one of them. Although the A-4 was not designed as a fighter, Dotan fired multiple salvos of rockets which struck and destroyed a MiG-17 in mid-air. Moments later, while maneuvering to evade return fire from another MiG, Dotan's aircraft entered a steep dive and nearly lost control. He managed to recover by jettisoning external stores, re-entered the fight, and ultimately positioned himself behind a second MiG-17. After a prolonged chase over mountainous terrain, Dotan fired a burst from his 30 mm DEFA cannon fitted in the A-4, hitting the MiG-17’s wing root and causing it to crash. These two aerial victories brought his total aerial victories to five, making him a fighter ace.

In the early 1970s, Dotan helped to develop unmanned aerial vehicles (UAV) within the Air Force. Despite suffering two heart attacks and undergoing open-heart surgery, he continued flying with a transport squadron. In 1974, he was appointed commander of Lod Airbase. He died on 15 May 1981 while still in active duty and was buried at Kiryat Shaul Military Cemetery.

== Personal life ==
Dotan and his wife had a daughter and two sons.

== Bibliography ==
- Aloni (2), Shlomo (2012). Israeli Mirage III and Nesher Aces (eBook). Bloomsbury Publishing. ISBN 9781782008873.
- Aloni, Shlomo (2012). Mirage III vs MiG-21: Six Day War 1967 (eBook). Bloomsbury Publishing. ISBN 9781782000624.
- Aloni, Shlomo (2013). Israeli A-4 Skyhawk Units in Combat (eBook). Bloomsbury Publishing. ISBN 9781849081290.
- Whittle, Richard (2014). Predator: The Secret Origins of the Drone Revolution (eBook). Henry Holt and Company. ISBN 9780805099652.
- Winchester, Jim (2004). Douglas A-4 Skyhawk: Attack & Close-Support Fighter Bomber (eBook). Pen & Sword Books. ISBN 9781473813731.
