= Hepher =

Hepher is a surname. Notable people with the surname include:

- Ali Hepher (born 1974), English rugby union player
- David Hepher (born 1935), British artist
- John Hepher (1850–1932), Australian politician

== Locations ==
- Biblical locations

== See also ==
- Gath-hepher, town in ancient Israel
- Hepher (biblical figure)
- Hefer
