= An Intimate Story =

- סיפור אינטימי
- Directed by: Nadav Levitan
- Written by: Nadav Levitan
- Produced by: Eitan Evan; Nissim Levy
- Starring: Chava Alberstein; Alexander Peleg
- Cinematography: Gadi Danzig
- Edited by: Isaac Sehayek
- Music by: Nachum Heiman
- Distributed by: Ergo Media (US)
- Release date: 1981
- Running time: 87 minutes
- Country: Israel
- Language: Hebrew

An Intimate Story (Hebrew: סיפור אינטימי) is a 1981 Israeli drama directed by Nadav Levitan. It was based on a short story written by Levitan and filmed in its entirety in Kibbutz Einat.

The script was written by Levitan together with Dalia Mevorach . It is the first of a trilogy of films Nadav Levitan wrote and directed which revolve around life in the Kibbutz. The other two are "Stalin's Disciples" (1987) and "No Names On The Doors" (1997).

== Plot ==
The film follows a married couple, Leah (Chava Alberstein) and Ya'akov (Alexander Peleg), who live on a kibbutz in the 1970s. Over a period of ten years, all of their attempts to conceive a child have been unsuccessful and their marriage begins to disintegrate as each suffers silently and blames the other. Their difficulties are compounded – and the damaging effects of the lack of privacy in an insular communal environment underscored – when their inability to conceive becomes a matter of public knowledge and gossip among the kibbutz members.

== Cast ==
- Chava Alberstein as Leah Gootman
- Alexander Peleg as Ya'akov
- Dan Toren
- Gilat Ankori
- Peter Freistadt
- Shmuel Shilo
- Shmuel Wolf

== Production ==
Levitan and Chava Alberstein, met on the set of the film and got married after that.
