= Sweet Pickles =

Children's book series

A Sweet Pickles book

Sweet Pickles was a series of 40children's books by Ruth Lerner Perle, Jacquelyn Reinach, and Richard Hefter and published by Holt, Rinehart & Winston. There were 26 books in the core collection and an additional 14 books created for the weekly reader. The series sold over 50 million copies. The books were set in the fictional town of Sweet Pickles and are about anthropomorphic animals with different personalities and behavior. There are 26 animals, one for each letter of the alphabet; half are male, and half are female. The books were published in 1977 and went out of print in the mid-1990s. The authors also created Stickybear and the Strawberry Library.

The series' name was a pun; in each book, the main character would get into a "pickle" (a difficult situation) because of an all-too-human personality trait. The front endpapers of the books portrayed the 26 characters, and the back endpapers portrayed a map of the town.

The books were advertised with television commercials and a catchy jingle.

The Sweet Pickles books were read in various episodes of the CBS television series Captain Kangaroo.

In 2012, the brand celebrated its 35th anniversary and the books were re-released as digitally enhanced E-Books, adding sound effects, narration and character voices performed by voice actors. The first 26 Books (A-Z) have been available at all major E-Retailers since Summer 2012. The E-Books were developed by Bento Box Interactive, a spin-off company of Bento Box Entertainment.

== Characters ==
The following is a list of the anthropomorphic characters living in the town of Sweet Pickles. There are 26 animals. One named for each letter of the alphabet.

- Accusing Alligator
  Gender: Female
  Manager of the Tower Apartments. Always blaming everyone for things that are usually her own doing.
- Bashful Bear
  Gender: Male
  Quiet and shy, he is afraid to speak up or try almost anything.
- Clever Camel
  Gender: Female
  Owns the town's Fix-It shop. She is known for being able to fix anything.
- Doubtful Dog
  Gender: Male
  Doubts anything and everything, including himself.
- Enormous Elephant
  Gender: Female
  Owner of the town's supermarket. Tends to overeat.
- Fearless Fish
  Gender: Female
  She is a town daredevil, known for her motorcycle and her special helmet-and-tank suit. She also delivers the village newspaper.
- Goof-off Goose
  Gender: Female
  Is so lazy, she is always putting off her chores for later.
- Healthy Hippo
  Gender: Male
  The town's physician, known for his health tips.
- Imitating Iguana
  Gender: Female
  She always tries to imitate everyone else.
- Jealous Jackal
  Gender: Male
  Is convinced that everyone else is better off than he is.
- Kidding Kangaroo
  Gender: Male
  The town's practical joker; tends to annoy everyone with his joking.
- Loving Lion
  Gender: Male
  Loves everyone in town, or tries to.
- Moody Moose
  Gender: Male
  Very emotional, smiling one minute, crying the next.
- Nasty Nightingale
  Gender: Female
  Always doing nasty or hurtful things to everyone in town.
- Outraged Octopus
  Gender: Female
  Very outspoken, and not afraid to put a stop to bad things in town.
- Positive Pig
  Gender: Female
  Always believes that no matter what happens, it's all for the best.
- Questioning Quail
  Gender: Female
  She is very indecisive, and is never able to make up her mind.
- Responsible Rabbit
  Gender: Male
  The town's banker, who never seems to deviate from his constantly busy schedule.
- Smarty Stork
  Gender: Male
  The town's postmaster who seems to have an answer to every question.
- Temper Tantrum Turtle
  Gender: Female
  Throws a tantrum when she doesn't get her own way.
- Unique Unicorn
  Gender: Female
  The oldest citizen in town who is not too old for having fun.
- Vain Vulture
  Gender: Male
  Always looking at his reflection and thinks he's good looking.
- Worried Walrus
  Gender: Male
  Worries about absolutely everything, no matter how innocuous.
- X-Rating Xerus
  Gender: Female
  She writes signs and doesn't allow anything. She has a stamp in one hand and a pencil in the other.
- Yakety Yak
  Gender: Male
  The town's taxi driver who is always chattering and talking.
- Zany Zebra
  Gender: Male
  Known for his unorthodox behavior, and isn't afraid to be different.

== Books in the series ==
Sweet Pickles was a fictional town with animal residents, whose misadventures impart basic values, ethics and social skills to children. A variety of techniques were employed in the series, such as comedy, music, story-telling, and active play. There was one book for each of the 26 Sweet Pickles characters, each represented a letter of the alphabet:

- Who Stole Alligator's Shoe?: Accusing Alligator blames everything and everybody for anything that happens. She's not nice, and she's as mean as Nightingale.
- Scaredy Bear: Bashful Bear is so shy he is afraid to try almost everything. He is known as scaredy bear. Too scared to ask Pig to be friends or play banjo-piccolo duets.
- Fixed by Camel: Clever Camel is very practical and she can fix anything, including Kidding Kangaroo.
- No Kicks for Dog: Doubtful Dog doubts anything and everything, including himself.
- Elephant Eats the Profits: Enormous Elephant loves to eat and eat and eat and eat. This becomes a problem when Rabbit points out that her supermarket is in financial trouble, so she has to curb her eating habits to save it.
- Fish and Flips: Fearless Fish careens around town on her motorcycle wearing her special helmet and tries to prove how fearless she is.
- Goose Goofs Off: Goof-off Goose is a procrastinator. She is always putting things off.
- Hippo Jogs for Health: Healthy Hippo always has the latest and greatest answer for keeping fit. This week it's jogging.
- Me Too Iguana: Imitating Iguana doesn't see how unique she is, and wants to be just like everybody else.
- Jackal Wants Everything: Jealous Jackal is convinced that everyone else is better off than he is.
- Who Can Trust You, Kangaroo?: Kidding Kangaroo does not know when to stop joking, clearly annoying all he sees.
- Lion Is Down in the Dumps: Loving Lion would like to love everybody all of the time.
- Moody Moose Buttons: Moody Moose constantly changes his mood.
- Nuts to Nightingale: Nasty Nightingale is so mean that she upsets and hurts everyone she meets. She makes everyone cry.
- Octopus Protests: Outraged Octopus is not afraid to say “No!” when she sees bad things go on around town.
- Pig Thinks Pink: Positive Pig is absolutely sure that no matter what happens, she believes it is all for the best. She especially keeps this attitude when she and Walrus try to plan a picnic, but everyone else is too busy (Nightingale just plain old refuses).
- Quail Can't Decide: Questioning Quail can not make up her mind.
- Rest, Rabbit, Rest: Responsible Rabbit is so busy that he never takes time to relax.
- Stork Spills the Beans: Smarty Stork has answers for every question, including who delivers babies (which, ironically, is not him).
- Turtle Throws a Tantrum: Temper Tantrum Turtle will do almost anything to get her own way.
- Happy Birthday, Unicorn: Unique Unicorn may be the oldest citizen in town, but she is not too old for fun.
- Kiss Me, I'm Vulture: Vain Vulture is self-centered and thinks he is better than everyone else.
- Very Worried Walrus: Worried Walrus worries a lot—especially about riding a bicycle.
- Xerus Won't Allow It: X-Rating Xerus thinks that telling people what is not allowed will solve all problems, but she understands that isn't always the case.
- Yakety Yak Yak Yak: Yakety Yak always talks and never listens.
- Zip Goes Zebra: Zany Zebra is not afraid to be different, which really annoys Alligator, Dog, and Kangaroo.

A poster and a plastic book case (which included a personalized decal set) was included with the subscription.

== Weekly Reader books ==
There were also 14 additional Weekly Reader books:

- A Bad Break
- The Grand Prize
- The Great Race
- Ice Cream Dreams
- Quick Lunch Munch
- Rainy Day Parade
- Robot S.P.3
- The Secret Club
- Some Friend
- Wait! Wait! Wait!
- Wet All Over
- Wet Paint
- What A Mess
- What's So Great About Nice?

== Avon Books and products ==
- Splashes and Bubbles and Foam and Other Soapy Things (AKA Avon Presents: All About Body Care, a Fun Book and Record)
- Curls and Bangs and Tangles and Other Hairy Things (AKA Avon Presents: All About Hair Care, a Fun Book and Record)
- Smiles and Grins and Giggles and Other Toothy Things (AKA Avon Presents: All About Tooth Care, a Fun Book and Record)
- Avon Pick a Pack of Sweet Pickles Puzzles (a pack of puzzles)
- Avon Accusing Alligator Bubble Bath
- Avon Loving Lion Non-Tear Shampoo
- Avon Outraged Octopus Toothbrush Holder and 2 Toothbrushes
- Avon Zany Zebra Hairbrush
- Avon Fearless Fish Face Mask and Face Soap
- Avon Yakety Yak Taxi Cab Sponge and Bar of Soap

== Additional items and books ==
- The Noisy Book Starring Yakety Yak (smaller softcover)
- The Angry Book Starring Temper Tantrum Turtle (smaller softcover) ISBN 0-394-85541-8
- The Scaredy Book Starring Worried Walrus (smaller softcover)
- The Messy Book Starring Goof-off Goose (smaller softcover)
- Two Read Along and Sing Along Stories: Why Do Socks Have to Match? and Clean-Your-Room-Or-Else! Starring Goof-Off-Goose Book and 33 1/3 record.
- "Goof-Off Goose's Dinner Party," a scratch and sniff book published by Random House.
- "Sweet Pickles 'Get to Know the World' Dictionaries," A-Z, published by Time Life.
- Sweet Pickles Activity Bus - Preschool Program. This was a green plastic bus filled with 5 × 7 cards describing activities for preschoolers. It included well over 150 cards, cardboard game boards, a spinner, plastic playing piece bases, etc.
- Sweet Pickles Board Game by Selchow and Righter
- Sweet Pickles Figurines by Enesco (a Christmas set included figurines of Accusing Alligator, Kidding Kangaroo, Moody Moose, Healthy Hippo, Responsible Rabbit, and Worried Walrus).
- Goof-Off Goose and Worried Walrus ceramic bookends by Enesco.
- Loving Lion and Accusing Alligator ceramic piggy banks by Enesco.
- Sweet Pickles aluminum garbage can by Balanoff featuring a large illustration of the entire cast of Sweet Pickles characters.
- Aluminum wall plaques featuring Goof-Off Goose and Healthy Hippo by Balanoff.
- Responsible Rabbit and Worried Walrus ceramic coffee mugs by Enesco.
- Series of Valentine's Day-themed ceramic coffee mugs by Enesco featuring various Sweet Pickles characters.
- Plush Christmas ornaments featuring Accusing Alligator and Worried Walrus.
- Plush stuffed animals of various Sweet Pickles characters.
- Sweet Pickles hair clips featuring Goof-Off Goose, Zany Zebra, and Bashful Bear.
- Health Is Very Healthy For You starring Healthy Hippo, vinyl LP, Parachute Records; 1983.
- Pop 26: Songs With Giggles and Tickles and Life's Silly Pickles by The Sweet Pickles Players (1980) (Catalog #EU 802A). A 2 LP (12" 33 1/3) set on Euphrosyne Records. It came with paper punch-outs of the Sweet Pickles Players and The Sweet Pickles Stand Up Play Stage. It features the songs:
1. "Sweet Pickles Theme Song" - Pop 26
2. "What a Wonderful Town This Could Be" - Outraged Octopus
3. "Lion Looks at Love" - Loving Lion
4. "I Do It Too" - Imitating Iguana
5. "Responsible Rabbit Rag" - Responsible Rabbit
6. "I'll Do It Tomorrow" - Goof-Off Goose
7. "Havin' Fun" - Zany Zebra
8. "Isn't It Sweet to Eat?" - Enormous Elephant
9. "Bashful Bare Blues" - Bashful Bear
10. "Tantrum" - Temper Tantrum Turtle
11. "If I Could Make Up My Mind" - Questioning Quail
12. "Stork Spills the Beans" - Smarty Stork
13. "Not Allowed" - X-Rating Xerus
14. "Haw, Haw, I'm Only Kidding" - Kidding Kangaroo
15. "I'm Gorgeous" - Vain Vulture
16. "I Am Clever" - Clever Camel
17. "I'm Moody Moose" - Moody Moose
18. "I'm Nasty Nightingale" - Nasty Nightingale
19. "Health is Very Healthy for You" - Healthy Hippo
20. "It's Your Fault" - Accusing Alligator
21. "Do the Yakety Yak" - Yakety Yak
22. "When the Going Gets Tough" - Fearless Fish
23. "That's Something to Worry About" - Worried Walrus
24. "Whatever Can Go Right, Will" - Positive Pig
25. "Down in the Dumps Again" - Doubtful Dog
26. "It's Not Fair" - Jealous Jackal
27. "Another Birthday" - Unique Unicorn
28. "Sweet Pickles Theme Song (Reprise)" - Pop 26
- The Sweet Pickles characters were voiced by Patricia Bright, Fran Carrol, Judy Daley, Ann Duquesnay, Paul Evans, Gordon Grody, Rose Marie Jun, Ron Marshall, Helen Miles, Norris O'Neil, Anne Phillips, Howard Ross, Leslie Shuman, Jerry Terheyden and Lionel Wilson.
- A 45 rpm single was released featuring "What a Wonderful Town This Could Be" by Outraged Octopus on the A-side and the previously unreleased "You Can't Say Enough About Love" as the B-side. Released on Parachute Records # 814 944-7.
- There were 2 audiocassette tapes with written lyrics included distributed by Creative Learning Products in collaboration with Euphrosyne, 1982:

First Cassette - Responsible Rabbit Rag including these songs:

1. "Sweet Pickles Theme Song" - Pop 26
2. "Responsible Rabbit Rag" -Responsible Rabbit
3. "Tomorrow" - Goof-Off Goose
4. "That's Something to Worry About" - Worried Walrus
5. "Whatever Can Go Right Will" - Positive Pig
6. "Taaaantrum" - Temper Tantrum Turtle
7. "Isn't It Sweet to Eat?" - Enormous Elephant
8. "Havin' Fun" - Zany Zebra
9. "If Only I Could Make Up My Mind" - Questioning Quail
10. "Stork Spills the Beans" - Smarty Stork
11. "Not Allowed" - X-Rating Xerus
12. "Haw, Haw, I'm Only Kidding" - Kidding Kangaroo
13. "I'm Gorgeous" - Vain Vulture
14. "Sweet Pickles Theme Song" (reprise)- Pop 26

2nd Cassette - Bashful Bear Blues including these songs:

1. "What a Wonderful Town This Could Be" - Outraged Octopus
2. "Lion Looks at Love" - Loving Lion
3. "Bashful Bare Blues" - Bashful Bear
4. "I Am Clever" - Clever Camel
5. "I'm Moody Moose" - Moody Moose
6. "I'm Nasty Nightingale" - Nasty Nightingale
7. "It's Your Fault" - Accusing Alligator
8. "When the Going Gets Tough" - Fearless Fish
9. "Down in the Dumps Again" - Doubtful Dog
10. "It's Not Fair" - Jealous Jackal
11. "Another Birthday" - Unique Unicorn
12. "Sweet Pickles Theme Song (Reprise)" - Pop 26
