= Richard Hefter =

American writer

Richard Hefter (March 20, 1941 – May 6, 2011) was an American author of books for young children.

== Biography ==
Richard Hefter met children's author Jacquelyn Reinach in 1975. He was contracted at the time to write 26 books for the publishers Holt. After the contract expired, he formed a publishing venture, Euphrosyne, with Reinach.

Hefter is known as the creator of Stickybear, the co-creator (with Reinach) and illustrator for the Sweet Pickles library of books, and the writer and illustrator for the Strawberry Library of First Learning. The Sweet Pickles series went on to sell 40 million copies. Hefter described his aim as "trying to help children understand things like shyness, laziness and embarrassment in a humorous way."

In 1982, Hefter formed a computer software company called Optimum Resource. He died in 2011 in Hilton Head Island, South Carolina.

== Works ==
The Strawberry Library of First Learning is a series of books written and illustrated by Hefter. Hefter is known as the creator of Stickybear and as the illustrator for the Sweet Pickles library of books. All of the books in the Strawberry Library have a strawberry depicted somewhere on the cover. Many of the books in this series star Stickybear or other anthropomorphic animals.

All were originally published by McGraw-Hill, Grosset & Dunlap, and Optimum Resource.

1. A Noise in the Closet (1974) ISBN 0-07-027802-4
2. The Strawberry Book of Shapes (1977) ISBN 0-88470-021-6
3. One Bear, Two Bears: The Strawberry Number Book (1980) ISBN 0-8374-0951-9
4. The Strawberry Book of Colors (1980) ISBN 0-07-027826-1
5. Some, More, Most (Written By Judy Freudberg and Illustrated by Richard Hefter) ISBN 0-88470-023-2
6. Yes and No: A Book of Opposites ISBN 0-07-027809-1
7. The Strawberry Mother Goose (Written by Lawrence Di Fiori and Illustrated by Richard Hefter) ISBN 0-07-027819-9
8. Noses and Toes: An Up and Down and in and Out Book ISBN 0-88470-006-2
9. An Animal Alphabet ISBN 0-88470-003-8
10. One White Crocodile Smile: A Number Book ISBN 0-448-14404-2
11. Things that Go ISBN 0-448-46809-3
12. The Strawberry Look Book ISBN 0-07-027824-5
13. The Strawberry Word Book ISBN 0-88470-001-1
14. Strawberry Picture Dictionary ISBN 0-07-027806-7
15. Bears at Work ISBN 0-911787-00-3
16. Stickybear Book of Weather ISBN 0-911787-01-1
17. Jobs for Bears (1983) ISBN 0-911787-02-X
18. Watch Out! The Stickybear Book of Safety (1983) ISBN 0-911787-03-8
19. Lots of Little Bears: A Stickbear Counting Book (1983) ISBN 0-911787-04-6
20. Bears Away From Home (1983) ISBN 0-911787-05-4
21. Where is the Bear? (1983) ISBN 0-911787-06-2
22. Neat Feet (1983) ISBN 0-911787-07-0
23. Babysitter Bears (1983) ISBN 0-911787-08-9
24. Fast Food (1983) ISBN 0-911787-09-7

=== Other software ===
- Fat City (1983), a first-person action game by Hefter and Steve Worthington where the player controls a wrecking ball and needs to destroy a number of buildings within a time limit.
- Old Ironsides (1983), a naval combat game by Hefter and Jack Rice.
- Chivalry (1983), a medieval adventure game co-written by Hefter and Janie and Steve Worthington.
