= No Names on the Doors =

- אין שמות על הדלתות
- Directed by: Nadav Levitan
- Screenplay by: Nadav Levitan
- Produced by: Uri Sabag; Nadav Levitan
- Starring: Chava Alberstein; Mosko Alkalai; Assi Dayan
- Cinematography: Valentin Belonogov
- Edited by: Anat Lubarsky
- Music by: Nachum Heiman
- Distributed by: Paralight Films
- Release date: January 1, 1997
- Running time: 84 minutes
- Country: Israel
- Language: Hebrew

No Names on the Doors (Hebrew: אין שמות על הדלתות) is a 1997 Israeli drama directed by Nadav Levitan. The film was screened at the Berlin International Film Festival, the Montpellier Film Festival, the Shanghai International Film Festival, and the Melbourne International Film Festival. It received five nominations for an Ophir Award including Best Actor and Best Screenplay and Best Soundtrack.

No Names on the Doors was shot entirely in Kibbutz Yakum and is the third film in director Levitan's trilogy about Israeli kibbutzim, following An Intimate Story (1981) and Stalin's Disciples (1986).

Nahum Heiman composed the music. The piece for flute, "The Journey to Jerusalem," has been played for many years as the opening theme for morning broadcasts on Reshet Bet.

== Plot ==
The film is set on a modern kibbutz as the spectre of an Arab invasion lurks in the background and financial pressures are breaking down traditional communal values. A series of fragile, interwoven stories mirror this disintegration of collective ideals: a longstanding friendship between two 40-year-old bachelors (Danni Bassan and Meir Swissa) ends tragically when one decides to get married; a bereaved father is embarrassed to find himself attracted to his dead son's girlfriend (Dorit Lev-Ari); and a mother (Chava Alberstein) perpetuates the memory of her dead son by tending to his room as a memorial. At the same time, an elderly man (Mosko Alkalai) discovers a new, more loving relationship with his intellectually-disabled adult son (Avi Pnini).

== Cast ==
- Chava Alberstein as Adina
- Mosko Alkalai as Kuba
- Assi Dayan as Uzi
- Avi Pnini as Israel
- Micha Selekter as Amos
- Dorit Lev-Ari as Aya
- Danni Bassan as Mordi
- Dan Wolman as Joseph
- Abraham Sandberg as GP
- Louise Zarchi as Shoshana
- Hekena Wallport as Suskia
- Shlomo Tarshish as Ely
- Meir Swissa as Simcha

== Reception ==
Deborah Young of Variety wrote that Levitan's third film in his kibbutz trilogy "brings the action to the present day to show the sad dissolution of collective ideals that were these agricultural co-ops' raison d'etre. Though not exceptionally original, the fragile, interwoven stories have a sincere, heartfelt quality that should play well in specialized film weeks and venues." Kevin Thomas of the Los Angeles Times called the movie "tender" and "moving".
