= Stickybear =

Fictional character

Stickybear is a fictional character created by Richard Hefter and an edutainment series starring the character headed by Optimum Resource. The character was a mascot of Weekly Reader Software, a division of Xerox Education Publications.

Software of the series has been released since the early 1980s. software programs originated on the Apple II and were released for IBM PC, Atari 8-bit computers, and Commodore 64.

As of 2008, the most recent Stickybear software was developed for Windows XP/Windows Vista and Mac OS X.

== Books with Stickybear ==
- Babysitter Bears (1983)
- Bears at Work (1983)
- Lots of Little Bears: A Stickybear Counting Book (1983)
- Stickybear Watch Out: The Stickybear Book of Safety (1983)
- Stickybear Book of Weather (1983)
- Where is the Bear? (1983)
- Stickybears Scary Night (1984)

== Software with Stickybear ==
The earliest software programs included picture books in colors and posters.

- At Home With Stickybear
- Stickybear Alphabet (IBM PC, Apple II) (Some versions included the book The Strawberry Look Book)
- Stickybear BASIC
- Stickybear Basket Bounce
- Stickybear Bop
- Stickybear Drawing
- Stickybear Early Learning Activities (Windows, Apple Macintosh Classic, Windows XP/Windows Vista, Mac OS X
- Stickybear Family Fun Game (Philips CD-i)
- Stickybear Kindergarten Activities
- Stickybear Math (Commodore 64, IBM PC, Apple II, Philips CD-i)
- Stickybear Math 1 Deluxe (Windows XP/Windows Vista, Mac OS X)
- Stickybear Math 2 (IBM PC)
- Stickybear Music
- Stickybear Music Library 1
- Stickybear Numbers
- Stickybear Opposites (IBM PC)
- Stickybear Parts of Speech
- Stickybear Picture Library 1
- Stickybear Preschool (CD-i)
- Stickybear Printer
- Stickybear Reading (Commodore 64, IBM PC, Philips CD-i)
- Stickybear Reading Comprehension
- Stickybear Shapes
- Stickybear Spellgrabber (Commodore 64, Mac OS 7)
- Stickybear Town Builder
- Stickybear Typing (Commodore 64, IBM PC)
- Stickybear Word Problems
- Stickybear's Reading Room (Mac OS 7)

== Reception ==
II Computing listed Stickybear tenth on the magazine's list of top Apple II educational software as of late 1985, based on sales and market-share data.

Compute!'s Gazette in 1986 approved of Stickybear's Typing Tutor's usefulness for all ages. The authors wrote that Stickybear Town Builder had excellent graphics and was effective and fun. They approved of its teaching map reading by encouraging children's creativity, reporting that their daughter had created ten towns.

Peter Mucha of the Houston Chronicle reviewed IBM versions of Stickybear in 1990; Stickybear Opposites received a B−, Stickybear Math received a B, Stickybear Math 2 received a B, Stickybear Alphabet received an A−, and Stickybear Reading received a C.

The New Talking StickyBear Alphabet won the Best Early Education Program 1989 Excellence in Software Award from the Software and Information Industry Association.

Leslie Eiser of Compute! magazine said in a 1992 review that StickyBear Town Builder was dated compared to other games of its time.

Computer Gaming World in 1993 said of Stickybear's Early Learning Activities, "In the world of early learning software, it's difficult to find anyone who does it better."
