= Heifer =

Heifer may refer to:

- Heifer (cow), a young cow before she has had her first calf
- Frank Heifer (1854–1893), American outfielder and first baseman
- The Heifer (La vaquilla), 1985 Spanish comedy film
- Heifer International, a charitable organization
- Red heifer, in Christianity or Judaism, was a heifer that was sacrificed and whose ashes were used for the ritual purification

== See also ==
- Heffer (disambiguation)
