= Gus Hefter =

Australian rules footballer

Personal information
- Full name: William Augustus Hefter
- Born: 29 April 1873; Melbourne
- Died: 1 February 1922 (aged 48); South Melbourne, Victoria
- Original team: West Melbourne Juniors

Playing career^{1}
Years	Club	Games (Goals)
1899	St Kilda	2 (0)
- ^{1} Playing statistics correct to the end of 1899.

Gus Hefter (29 April 1873 – 1 February 1922) was an Australian rules footballer who played with St Kilda in the Victorian Football League (VFL).
