= Kobi Ifrach =

Israeli bodybuilder (born 1996)

Personal information
- Native name: קובי יפרח
- Nationality: Israeli
- Born: September 2, 1996 (age 29)

Sport
- Country: Israel
- Sport: Bodybuilding

Yaacov (Kobi) Ifrach (Hebrew: יעקב (קובי) יפרח; born September 2, 1996) is an Israeli bodybuilder. Kobi is the only Israeli to win Mr. Universe Junior on behalf of the NABBA Association. As of 2019, Kobi holds a professional card (International Federation of BodyBuilding & Fitness pro), and one of the few Israelis to hold that card, and the youngest of them to win it (22).

== Biography ==
Ifrach was born and raised in Zichron Yaacov, to an ultra-Orthodox religious home, which has eight brothers and sisters. Already at the age of 11 his older brother Meir exposed him to the world of bodybuilding he fell in love with. When he was young, he was sent to study at a yeshiva in Tiberias, but he would often leave his Torah lessons to work out in the gym.

At 16, Ifrach first competed in Mr. Israel on behalf of the NABBA Association, which won him second place in the youth category. In 2013, Kobi first won the Mr. Israel competition, where he lost in the final the year before. Kobi held the title of Mr. Israel on behalf of the NABBA Association until the age of 21 for four years, and from 2015 to 2016 he also won the title of champion of this competition. In July 2015, the young Ifrach won the title of Deputy Mr. World of Youth, in the competition held in Malta, and in May a year later, again won second place, in the Mr. World of Competition held in Brazil.

In October 2016, Ifrach won the grand title of his career so far, and was the first Israeli in decades of the competition to win it in his category. He won Mr. Universe on behalf of the NABBA Association. A year later, Ifrach flourished again in this competition in Birmingham, England, with another Israeli, who for years served as Kobi's partner, Shalev Ledani. Since Kobi passed the age of 21, he knew he would not be able to enter this competition in October 2018, so he tried his luck in another competition - Top de Colmar, France, on April 8, 2018. Kobi reached this competition to compete in the Semi Pro category, where bodybuilders from the highest levels compete in the world, and is not limited in age. Ifrach won second place in this competition. A month later, he did it again and won Mr. Israel and the Champions Champion for the third time. On June 10, he flew to Spain with his first trainer - Eyal Hasson, for the world's largest competition, Mr. Olympia Amateur. He won first place in the youth category up to the age of 24, and in fifth place with the same ranking as sixth, in the category "Heavy Education up to 90 kg". Inflorescence rose in the competition weighing 86 kg, while still 1.69 meters.

On June 9, 2019, Ifrach won first place in the Mr. Olympia Amateur Championship, a status that earned him a professional ticket (IFBB pro) and placed him in the Israeli record book when he is one of the few to do so.

== Personal life ==
Since 2016, Kobi Ifrach has served as the presenter of the world's largest bodybuilding apparel company, Gorilla Wear, and the Canadian sports nutrition supplement company Beverly Nutrition. In his youth from his personal trainer he was a bodybuilder - Eyal Hasson, but for the past three years his personal trainer was Dani Kaganovich, another young bodybuilder who has won several impressive titles in the world. Kobi is a member of the NABBA Association, whose president of the Association is "Mr. World", June Hannah. From 2018 Kobi Ifrach has run a personal training and counseling program in bodybuilding and preparation for contests, and even runs weight loss programs, including general weight loss for the public, regardless of competitions. In 2019 Ifrach finished his contract with "Beverly Nutrition" and signed a contract with the Israeli dietary supplement company "Amino".

In February 2020 Kobi signed on a new contract with Beverly Nutrition to be their presenter at world bodybuilding shows.
