= Café Apropo bombing =

1997 bombing in Tel Aviv, Israel

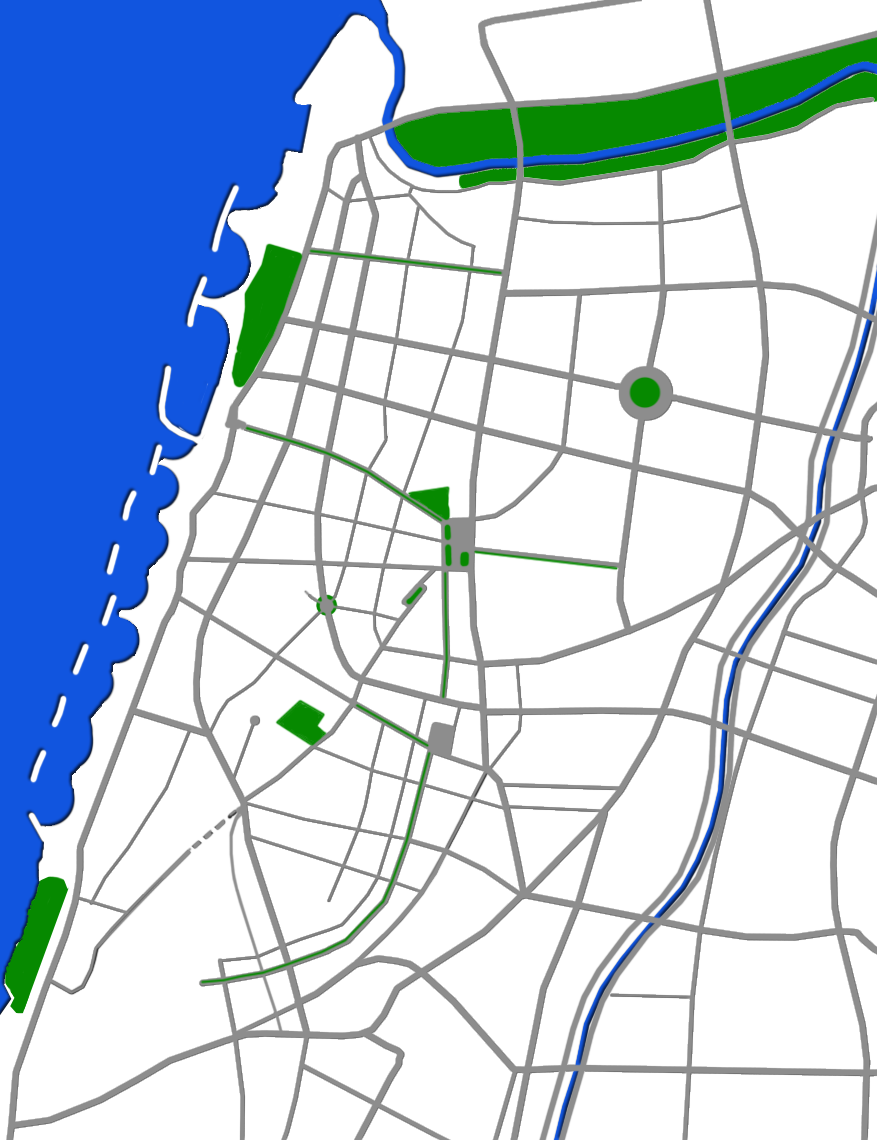
- Location: 32°05′01″N 34°46′33″E; Tel Aviv, Israel
- Date: 21 March 1997 c. 13:40 pm (GMT+2)
- Attack type: suicide bombings
- Deaths: 3 civilians (+1 bomber)
- Injuries: 48
- Perpetrator: Hamas claimed responsibility

The Café Apropo bombing was a Palestinian suicide bombing which occurred on 21 March 1997 in a coffee shop in Tel Aviv. Three women were killed in the attack and 48 were injured.

== The attack ==
The attack occurred on 21 March 1997, on the eve of the Purim holiday, at around 13:40, when a Palestinian suicide bomber detonated an explosive device which was concealed in a handbag in the entrance to the coffee shop "Apropo" in Tel Aviv. The force of the explosion killed three young women in their early 30s, one of them was three months pregnant.

=== Assailant ===
The assailant has been identified as Musa Abd al-Qadir Ghanimat from the West Bank village of Surif. He was member of a Hamas cell run by a relative, Ibrahim Ghanimat, who was finally captured in 2005. The cell, sometimes called the "Surif squad", is also responsible for several other attacks against Israeli targets. It was believed at least at some point during the investigations that the assailant had no intention to die as a suicide bomber, but that the timing device misfired.

== Aftermath ==
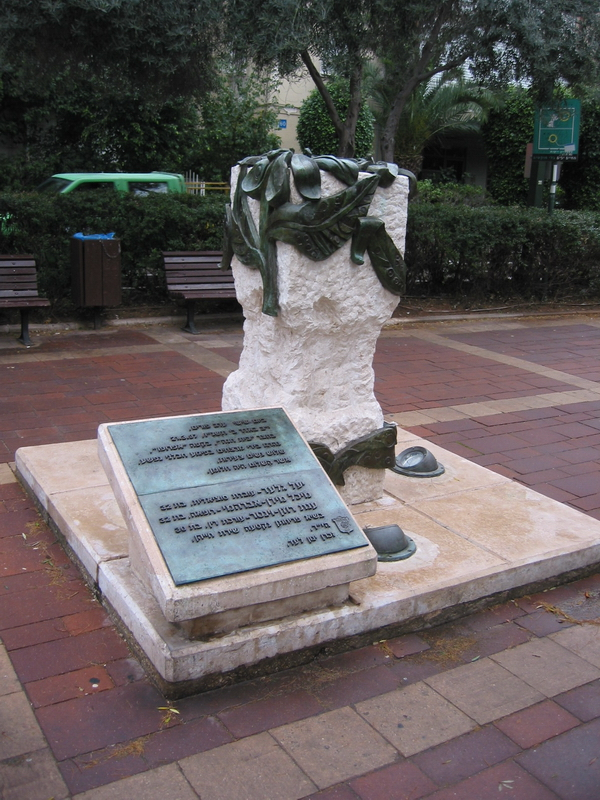
The memorial built at the site of the event in memory of the victims of the attack

Following the attack, the Israeli Military Intelligence Directorate found for the first time clear evidence which proved that the Palestinian leader Yasser Arafat was encouraging and initiating militant attacks on Israeli civilians within Israel in order to advance the negotiations with Israel.

A monument has been placed near the site of the attack which was created by the artist Eliezer Weishoff. The monument depicts three roses which were cut off.

The attack is remembered among the Israeli public, in part, due to the picture taken of a six-month-old infant girl in a clown costume who survived the attack because she was saved by her mother, who protected her with her body from the force of the blast. In January 2015, the child from the photograph, since identified as Shani Winter, joined the Israel Defense Forces, accompanied by the same traffic policewoman who carried her in the photo.
