= Heffer =

Heffer may refer to:

- Eric Heffer (1922-1991), British Labour Party politician
- Richard Heffer (born 1946), British television and film actor
- Simon Heffer (born 1960), British journalist, author and political commentator
- Heffer Wolfe, a character from the Nicktoon Rocko's Modern Life

== See also ==
- Heffers bookshop
- Heifer (disambiguation)
