= Baba Luba =

- Directed by: Julie Shles
- Written by: Julie Shles
- Starring: Danny Bassan
- Release date: 1995
- Running time: 60 minutes
- Country: Israel
- Language: English

Baba Luba is an Israeli documentary that follows musician Danny Bassan on his journey to Brazil to find his long-lost father. It won the Best Documentary category at the Israeli Film Academy Awards.

== See also ==
- Cinema of Israel
- Culture of Israel
