= Noor Bisan =

Israeli-Druze footballer

Noor Bisan نور بيسان
Personal information
- Full name: Noor Bisan
- Date of birth: January 17, 1995 (age 31)
- Place of birth: Julis, Israel
- Position: Striker

Team information
- Current team: Maccabi Nujeidat

Youth career
- 2007–2010: F.C. Julis
- 2010–2011: Maccabi Haifa
- 2011–2014: Maccabi Netanya

Senior career*
| Years | Team | Apps | (Gls) |
| 2013–2018 | Maccabi Netanya | 4 | (1) |
| 2016 | → Hapoel Beit She'an (loan) | 3 | (0) |
| 2016–2017 | → Maccabi Kiryat Gat (loan) | 8 | (5) |
| 2017–2018 | Ironi Kiryat Ata | 14 | (2) |
| 2018–2019 | Hapoel Bik'at HaYarden | 7 | (2) |
| 2019–2020 | Maccabi Herzliya | 44 | (13) |
| 2020 | Hapoel Kfar Saba | 6 | (0) |
| 2020–2021 | Maccabi Kabilio Jaffa | 21 | (5) |
| 2021 | F.C. Haifa Robi Shapira | 5 | (0) |
| 2021–2022 | Ironi Tiberias | 7 | (3) |
| 2022 | Hapoel Karmiel | 12 | (1) |
| 2022 | Tzeirei Kafr Kanna | 8 | (0) |
| 2022–2023 | Maccabi Ironi Tamra | 19 | (6) |
| 2023– | Maccabi Nujeidat | 0 | (0) |
- * Club domestic league appearances and goals as of 1 June 2021

Noor Bisan (Arabic: نور بيسان, Hebrew: נור ביסאן; born January 17, 1995) is a Druze-Israeli footballer, who plays for Maccabi Nujeidat in the Liga Bet.

Noor made his debut for Netanya on February 9, 2013, in a league game against Bnei Yehuda.
