= Chivalry (1983 video game) =

1983 video game

- Developer: Optimum Resource
- Publisher: Weekly Reader Family Software
- Designers: Richard Hefter; Steve Worthington; Janie Worthington
- Platform: Apple II
- Release: NA: 1983
- Genre: Role-playing
- Modes: Single-player, multiplayer

Chivalry is an action role-playing video game written by Richard Hefter, Steve Worthington, and Janie Worthington for the Apple II. It was published in 1983 by Weekly Reader Family Software.

== Gameplay ==
The king has been captured by the Black Knight, and players must make their way to the Black Knight's castle and retrieve him.

The game is a combination between a board game (though the board itself is not displayed in the game) and an action game. Up to four players can play, but must wait their turn for their move. On each turn, the computer will either "roll the die" or "spin the wheel" to randomly direct the character to move either one, two, or three spaces. On the first roll or spin, for example, each player will end up at the Archers' Meet, the Rolling Hill, or the Mill. At each board tile, the character is presented with a narrative, a choice, or an action based mini-game. Choices or items acquired earlier on the board can affect play in subsequent tiles.

== Reception ==
Johnny Wilson reviewed the program for Computer Gaming World, and stated that "Chivalry is a delightful family game. It is, of course, to most adult computer games what Life is to adult boardgames, extremely simple. Yet, it is a game that offers some interesting challenges to adults, as well as children."
