= A Beautiful Valley =

- Theatrical poster of France
- Directed by: Hadar Friedlich
- Written by: Hadar Friedlich
- Produced by: Yael Fogiel; Yochanan Kredo; Eylon Ratzkovsky; Laetitia Gonzalez; Guy Jacoel; Yossi Uzrad
- Starring: Batia Bar; Hadar Avigad; Gili Ben-Ozilio; Eli Ben-rey; Hadas Porat; Ruth Geller
- Cinematography: Talia Galon
- Edited by: Hadar Friedlich; Nelly Quettier
- Music by: Uri Ophir
- Production company: July August Productions
- Distributed by: Les Films du Poisson (France)
- Release dates: July 10, 2011 (Jerusalem Film Festival); November 14, 2012 (France)
- Running time: 86 minutes
- Countries: Israel; France
- Language: Hebrew

A Beautiful Valley (Hebrew: עמק תפארת) is a 2011 Israeli drama that follows an 80-year-old kibbutz member and widow whose world falls apart as the kibbutz she helped establish undergoes privatization. Hadar Friedlich directed the film, which was her first feature-length directorial work.

Batia Bar (1929–2022), a member of Kibbutz Gesher, plays the lead role alongside Gili Ben Ozilio, who portrays her daughter. This was Gili Ben Ozilio's final film; she died from cancer after the filming was completed, and the film was dedicated to her memory.

The film premiered at the Jerusalem Film Festival in July 2011, receiving the Best Full-Length Debut award. In a controversial decision by the festival management, however, the prize was revoked at the last minute following a complaint of an alleged conflict of interest by one of the jury members. It was also nominated for a 2011 Ophir Award in the Best Actress and Best Cinematography categories received a Special Jury Mention at the San Sebastián International Film Festival, and won the Critic's Prize at the Cinémed Montpellier Film Festival.

== Plot ==
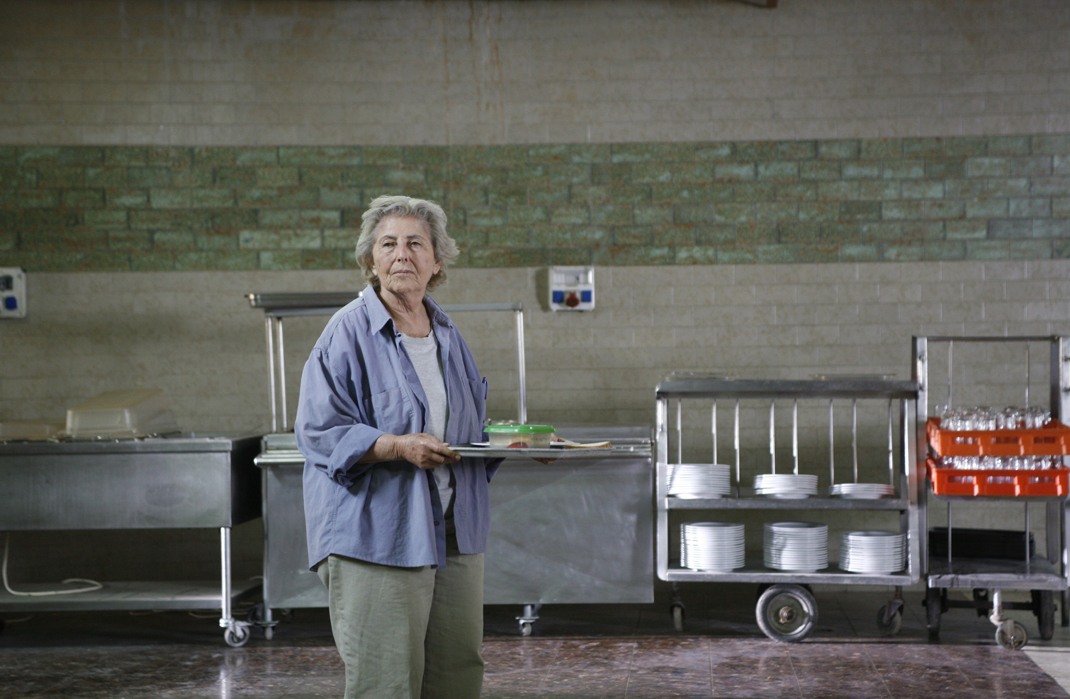
Batia Bar in A Beautiful Valley

Hanna Mendelssohn (Batia Bar), an elderly widow, is a proud founding member of her kibbutz and has devoted most of her life to its development. When it is threatened with bankruptcy and privatized, she is forced out of her job as the community's gardener, turning from a hard-working productive member of society into a dependent burden. Although she still believes in the values of social equality and cooperation that characterized the kibbutz in its early years, Hanna struggles to maintain her usefulness and sense of worth in a society undergoing a sudden and profound transformation.

== Cast ==
- Batia Bar as Hanna
- Gili Ben-Ozilio as Yael
- Hadar Avigad as Naama
- Eli Ben-rey as Shimon
- Hadas Porat as Odeda
- Ruth Geller as Miriam

== Critical reception ==
Jay Weissberg of Variety said Friedlich's debut "tackles a forgotten subject with sensitivity".
