= Bar Hefer =

Israel beauty pageant contestant (born 1995)

Bar Hefer בר חפר
- Born: 1995 (age 30–31) 18; Israel
- Height: 1.73 m (5 ft 8 in)
- Beauty pageant titleholder
- Title: Miss Israel
- Major competitions: Miss Israel (Winner)

Bar Hefer (Hebrew: בר חפר; born 1995) is an Israel beauty pageant titleholder who was crowned Miss World Israel 2013.

== Early life ==
Bar was born in Petah Tikva and now works as a model in Tel Aviv.

== Miss Israel 2013 ==
Bar Hefer is 1st Runner Up Miss Israel (the Israel Maiden of Beauty) at the grand finale of Miss Israel 2013 beauty contest at the Haifa International Convention Center on 27 February 2013.

Awards and achievements
Preceded by Lina Makhuli	Miss Israel; 2013	Succeeded by Incumbent
