= Old Ironsides (video game) =

1982 video game

- Publisher(s): Xerox Educational Publications
- Platform(s): Apple II
- Release: 1982
- Genre(s): Naval wargaming

Old Ironsides is a 1982 video game published by Xerox Educational Publications for the Apple II.

== Gameplay ==
Old Ironsides is a game in which two players fight each other using ships armed with six guns on each side.

== Reception ==
Computer Gaming World reviewed the game and stated that "Old Ironsides (OI) is an excellent example of a game that combines graphic/arcade features with strategic planning." Noting that it was not designed for solo play, InfoWorld said "It didn't hold my interest for more than a few minutes".
