= Stalin's Disciples =

1986 film

Stalin's Disciples (in Hebrew Stalin's Children)
- ילדי סטאלין
- Directed by: Nadav Levitan
- Written by: Gadi Danzig; Nadav Levitan
- Produced by: Doron Eran
- Starring: Aharon Almog
- Cinematography: Gadi Danzig
- Edited by: Shimon Tamir
- Music by: Chava Alberstein
- Distributed by: Tal-Shahar
- Release date: 1986
- Running time: 95 minutes
- Country: Israel
- Language: Hebrew

Stalin's Disciples (Hebrew: ילדי סטאלין, in Hebrew Stalin's Children) is a 1986 Israeli film directed by Nadav Levitan that satirizes the utopian ideology of the Israeli kibbutz.

The death of Joseph Stalin in the 1950s leads to an ideological crisis on a kibbutz that identifies with communist principles. The blind faith of three elderly shoemakers, who previously abused a young boy daring to criticize Stalin, begins to disintegrate when they learn of the Soviet leader's crimes and the manifest antisemitism on display at the Prague Trials.

It's 1953 at Kibbutz Hashomer Hatzaier (The Young Guard, in Hebrew). Moshko (Hugo Yarden) admires Stalin's portrait at his shoemaker workshop as he cleans the dust off the mustache.

The film was shot in Kibbutz Nir Eliyahu.

== Plot ==
A Kibbutz of Hashomer Hatzair in 1953. The shoemaker Moshiko (Hugo Yarden) gazes in admiration at a picture of Stalin in the shoemaker's workshop, cleaning off dust that has settled on his mustache. Label (Yossi Kantz) enters the workshop and reads from a newspaper about Stalin's difficult situation . Following him is Avraham'le (Shmuel Shila) carrying a radio. He connects it to electricity, and a voice announces in Russian the death of Stalin, causing the three shoemakers to burst into tears.

The kibbutz gathers for a mourning assembly where member Elka (Doron Golan) speaks about Stalin's virtues. He is sent by the kibbutz on a mission to Eastern Europe.

In the kibbutz is Koba (David Rona), an abstract painter who despises communist ideas, and the kibbutz members are angry with him because he takes days for painting at the expense of work. Koba is having an affair with Rachel, Elka’s wife (Atalya Friedman).

Among the kibbutz children is a boy named Yankele, sent by his bourgeois father to be educated in the kibbutz. The children hit him because of his words against Stalin. He runs away from them and arrives at the shoemaker's workshop, where he says they beat him for not speaking nicely of Stalin, whom he calls "the tyrant." The shoemakers want to beat him too, but he manages to escape.

Dora (Rachel Dobson) is a disabled Holocaust survivor working in the infirmary. Shmulik (Aharon Almog) is secretly involved with her and asks her not to give up the compensation from Germany so that they can use that money to leave the kibbutz and travel to America.

Atak (Ezra Dagan) is a teacher in the kibbutz, shy and lacking character. He is married to Gita (Rachel Volk), who has a heart condition and struggles to walk. With the compensation funds, she undergoes heart surgery in America and returns healthy.

The kibbutz receives news that Atak has been tried and imprisoned for espionage against the Soviet Union. Moshiko and Label doubt his guilt, but Avraham'le scolds them and throws clichés at them like, "There's no smoke without fire" and "When you chop wood, chips fly."

Avraham'le prepares for the kibbutz celebration for the 20th Congress of the Communist Party of the Soviet Union. The kibbutz secretary, Moshe (Dudik Smadar), storms into the hall and announces the cancellation of the celebration in light of Khrushchev's revelations about Stalin's crimes. Moshe bursts all the balloons that were prepared for decoration. Avraham'le, whose world has collapsed, collapses and stops speaking. In response, the shoemakers shave off their Stalinist mustaches. Avraham'le does not respond to the request of Secretary Moshe and his shoemaker colleagues to speak to them.

Atak returns to the kibbutz after his imprisonment and is welcomed in a festive ceremony. In his speech, he declares that he still adheres to the socialist method. Avraham'le hears the speech from his friend. His eyes open, and he smiles.

Finally, the secretary and the shoemakers arrive at Avraham'le's bedside to inform him of the launch of the Sputnik. He opens his eyes, and they take him to watch the Sputnik from the water tower using binoculars.

They look at the sky but cannot identify the Sputnik. Avraham'le looks through the binoculars, and a wide smile spreads across his face; instead of the crescent moon, he sees the hammer and sickle symbol.

== Cast ==
- Aharon Almog
- Ezra Dagan
- Rahel Dobson
- Doron Golan
- Yossi Kantz
- David Rona
- Shmuel Shiloh
- Hugo Yarden

== Critical reception ==
The film was screened at Un Certain Regard section of the 1988 Cannes Film Festival. Although it was both a critical and a commercial failure, it was nominated for a Golden Globe Award and was the first Israeli feature to participate in the Moscow and Warsaw Film Festivals.

Yehuda (Judd) Neeman, a film researcher and director, said that Stalin's Disciples ( in Hebrew Stalin's Children) was "the first film to look ironically at Stalinism and the kibbutz movement. .. Nadav Levitan took characters from the actual fabric of the kibbutz he knew, including the sandal workshop with Stalin's picture on the wall, and little by little wove the pieces together. Blind worship for Stalin and unshaken belief in the Soviet Union was disintegrating on the kibbutz, partly triggered by 1952 Prague arrest and confession under torture of spying for British intelligence against Communist states by far left Hashomer Hatzair and Mapam functionary Mordechai Oren of Kibbutz Mizra.

At the end of the film there is the charming moment when one of the heroes looks at the sky, doesn't believe that this era has ended, looks at the moon and instead of seeing the crescent, sees the hammer and sickle. In my eyes, this is a brilliant cinematic touch and also a statement of political film, which was at its peak here in those days."
