= Nadav Levitan =

Israeli film director

- נדב לויתן
- Born: 21 April 1945; Kibbutz Kfar Masaryk, Palestine (now Israel)
- Died: 9 January 2010 (aged 64); Petah Tikva
- Occupations: Film director; screenwriter
- Years active: 1981–1999

Nadav Levitan (Hebrew: נדב לויתן; 21 April 1945 – 9 January 2010) was an Israeli film director, screenwriter, writer, and songwriter. He directed nine films between 1981 and 1999. His film Stalin's Disciples (in Hebrew Stalin's Children, ילדי סטאלין), was screened in the Un Certain Regard section at the 1988 Cannes Film Festival. He was married to Israeli musician Chava Alberstein, who recorded many of his songs. Levitan died on 10 January 2010 of an undisclosed lung ailment.

== Filmography ==
- An Intimate Story (1981)
- Ha-Kala (1985)
- Banot (1985)
- Stalin's Disciples (1986)
- Groupie (1993)
- Too Early to Be Quiet, Too Late to Sing (1995)
- No Names on the Doors (1997)
- Aviv (1998)
- Frank Sinatra Is Dead (1999)
