= Chava Alberstein =

Israeli musician (born 1946)

Chava Alberstein חוה אלברשטיין
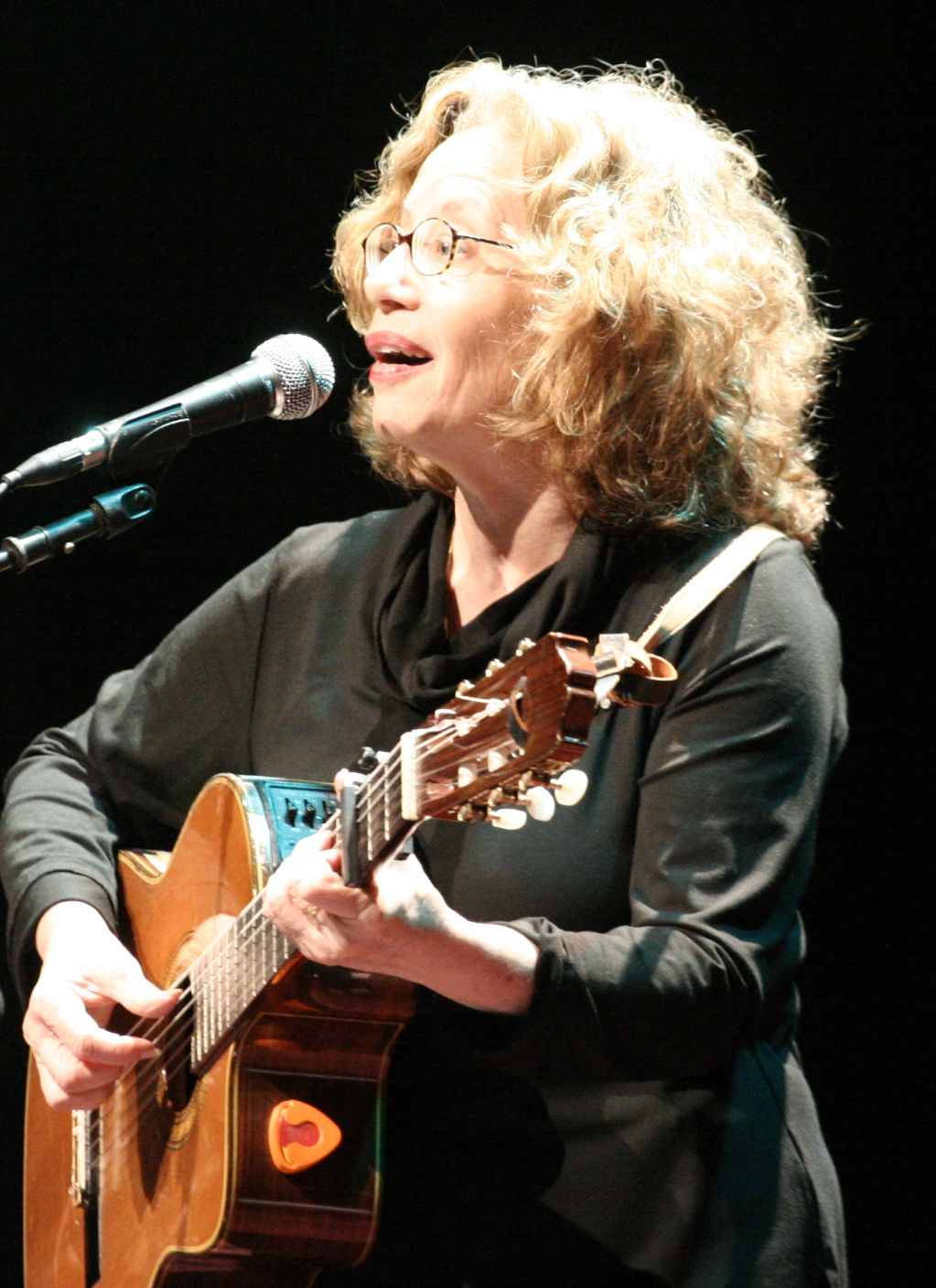
- Alberstein in 2007

Background information
- Born: Ewa Alberstein; 8 December 1946 (age 79); Szczecin, Poland
- Origin: Kiryat Haim, Israel
- Genres: Folk; folk rock
- Occupation: Musician
- Instruments: Vocals; guitar
- Years active: 1964–present
- Labels: CBS; NMC; Rounder; Auvidis; EMI; Shanachie; Media Directs

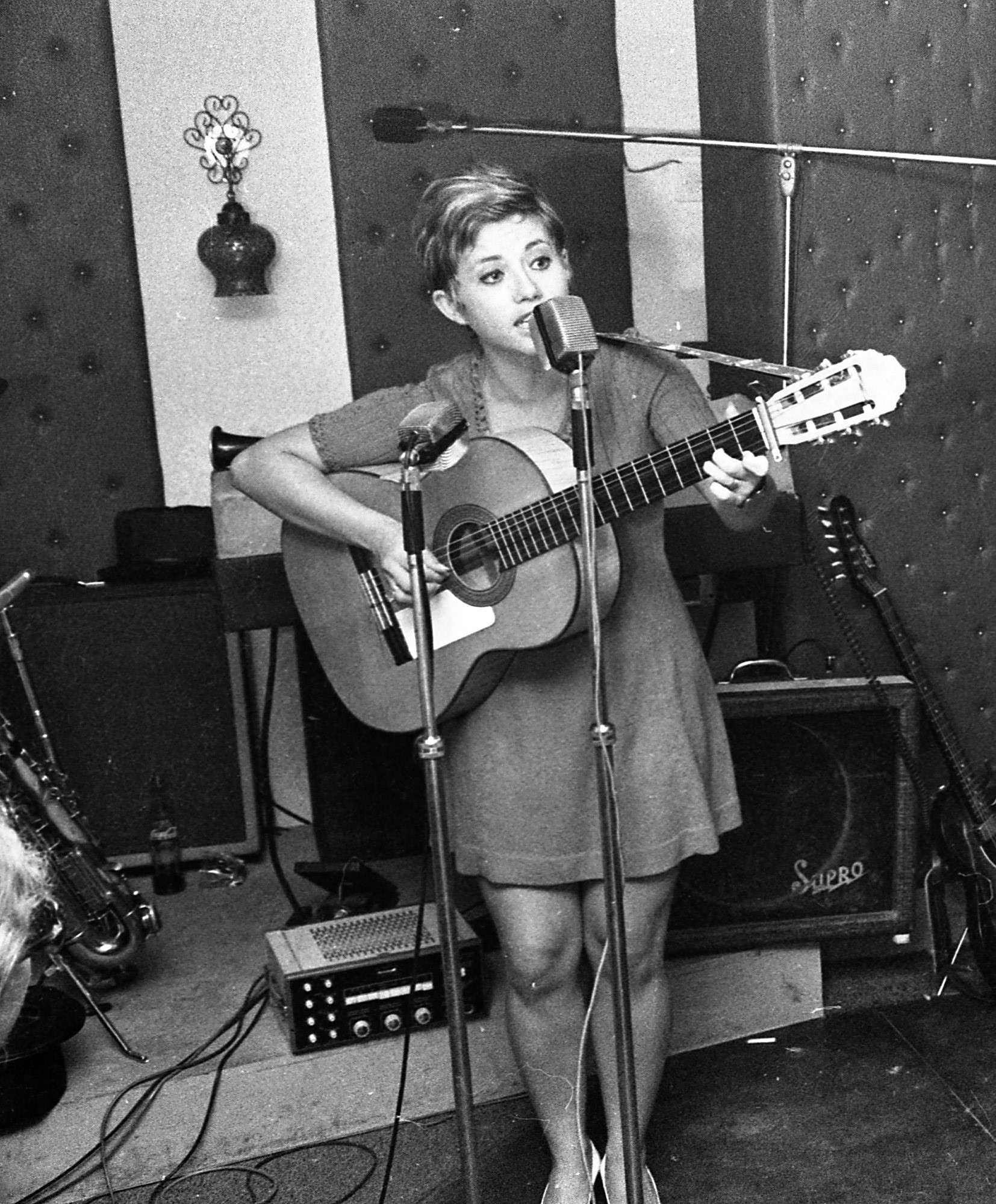
Chava Alberstein in a performance for Israeli wounded soldiers, 1969

Chava Alberstein (Hebrew: חוה אלברשטיין [ˈχava ˈʔalbeʁʃtejn], born 8 December 1946 in Poland) is an Israeli musician, lyricist, composer, and musical arranger. She moved to Israel in 1950 and started her music career in 1964. Alberstein has released over sixty albums in Hebrew, English, and Yiddish. She is known for her liberal activism and advocacy for human rights and Arab-Israeli unity, which has sometimes stirred controversy, such as the ban of her song "Chad Gadya" by Israel State Radio in 1989. Alberstein has received numerous accolades, including the Kinor David Prize, the Itzik Manger Prize, and honorary doctorates from several universities.

== Biography ==
Born Ewa Alberstein in Szczecin, Poland, her name was Hebraized to Chava when she moved to Israel with her family in 1950. She grew up in Kiryat Haim.

In 1964, when she was seventeen, Alberstein was invited to appear at the Hammam Nightclub in Jaffa. She sang four songs, accompanied by herself on guitar and her brother Alex on the clarinet. The program was broadcast live on the radio. After a guest appearance on Moadon Hazemer, recorded on Kibbutz Beit Alfa, she signed a recording contract with CBS. Early in her career, she appeared at the Amami Cinema in Haifa's Neve Sha'anan neighborhood. Haaretz columnist Neri Livneh described her as "a little slip of a thing in a blue youth movement shirt, her face covered by huge glasses".

Alberstein was drafted into the Israel Defense Forces in 1965 and became one of many Israeli artists to rise to stardom by entertaining the troops.

=== Musical career ===
Alberstein has released more than sixty albums. She has recorded in Hebrew, English, and Yiddish. In 1980, she began to write and compose. Most of the songs on her album Mehagrim are her own work. Alberstein's husband was the filmmaker Nadav Levitan, who wrote the lyrics for her album End of the Holiday. In 1986, Alberstein wrote music for her husband's film Stalin's Disciples. Levitan died in 2010. Alberstein's songs have been included in a number of multi-artist collections, among them Songs of The Vilna Ghetto and The Hidden Gate – Jewish Music Around the World.

== Critical acclaim ==
According to Israel's second largest daily newspaper, Yedioth Ahronoth, Alberstein is the most important female folk singer in Israeli history:

If [Israel has] a true folk singer, it is Chava Alberstein.

== Political views and controversy ==
Alberstein is a champion of liberal causes. Throughout her career, she has been an activist for human rights and Arab-Israeli unity. In 1989, her song "Chad Gadya" (a version of the song traditionally sung at the Passover seder with an additional verse in which she implicitly criticizes Israel's policy towards Palestinians) was banned by Israel State Radio. The song was later used in the film Free Zone by director Amos Gitai in Natalie Portman's seven-minute crying scene.

Alberstein is also a proponent of the Yiddish language, both in her recordings and in a video titled "Too Early to Be Quiet, Too Late to Sing", which showcases the works of Yiddish poets.

== Awards ==
Six of Alberstein's albums have won the Kinor David prize. In 1999, she received the Itzik Manger Prize. On 28 January 2011, she received the Lifetime Achievement Music Award from the Israel Association of Composers, Authors and Publishers of Musical Works, and holds honorary doctorates from Tel Aviv University and the Weizmann Institute of Science of Israel. On 13 May 2018, she was awarded an honorary doctorate in music from Brandeis University. In 2022, she received the Israeli Artists' Association Lifetime Achievement Award.

== Discography ==
Number	Album name	Release date	Language	References
1	Hine Lanu Nigun	1967	Yiddish	
2	Perach haLilach	1967	Hebrew	
3	Tza'atzueiah shel Osnat	1967	Hebrew	
4	Mirdaf	1970	Hebrew	Gold
5	Mot haParpar	1968	Hebrew	
6	Chava Alberstein beShirei Rachel	1969	Hebrew	
7	Margaritkalach	1969	Yiddish	
8	Mishirei eretz ahavati	1970	Hebrew	
9	Chava beTochnit Yachid 1	1971		
10	Chava beTochnit Yachid 2	1971		
11	Isha ba'Avatiach	1971	Hebrew	
12	Chava vehaPlatina	1974		
13	Chava veOded be'Eretz haKsamim	1972		
14	Lu Yehi	1973	Hebrew	
15	K'mo Tzemach bar	1975	Hebrew	
16	Lehitei haZahav	1975	Hebrew	Gold
17	Tzolelet Tzabarit	1975 or 1976		
18	Elik Belik Bom	1976		
19	Halaila hu shirim	1977	Hebrew	
20	Karusella 1	1977		
21	Karusella 2	1977		
22	Karusella 3	1977		
23	Shirei Am beYiddish	1977	Yiddish	
24	Hitbaharut	1978		
25	Chava vehaGitara	1978		
26	Chava Zingt Yiddish	1979	Yiddish	
27	Ma Kara ba'Eretz Mi	1979		
28	Ani Holechet Elai	1980		
29	Shir beMatana	1980		
30	Kolot	1982		
31	Shiru Shir im Chava	1982		
32	Nemal Bayit	1983		Gold
33	Avak shel kochavim	1984		
34	Mehagrim	1986		
35	Od Shirim beYiddish	1987	Yiddish	
36	HaTzorech baMilah, haTzorech baShtika	1988		
37	London	1989		
38	MiShirei Eretz Ahavati	1990	Hebrew	
39	Ahava Mealteret	1991	Hebrew	Gold
40	HaChita Zomachat Shuv	1992	Hebrew	
41	The Man I Love	1992		
42	Margaritkalach	1994	Yiddish	
43	Derech Achat	1995		
44	London beHofaah (Live)	1995		
45	Yonat ha'Ahava	1996	Hebrew	
46	Adaber Itcha	1997	Hebrew	
47	The Collection (Box set)	1998	Hebrew	Gold
48	Crazy Flower	1998	Hebrew	
49	The Well – with The Klezmatics	1998	Yiddish	
50	Chava Alberstein – Yiddish Songs	1999	Yiddish	
51	Tekhef Ashuv	1999	Hebrew	
52	Children's Songs – The Collection	2000	Hebrew	
53	Foreign Letters	2001		
54	The Early Years – The Box Set	2003		
55	End of the Holiday	2004	Hebrew	
56	Coconut	2005	Hebrew	
57	Like a Wild Flower (New Version)			
58	Lemele	2006		
59	The Milky Way – Songs for Children	2007		
60	Human Nature	2008		
61	From Alberstein's Live Concert	2008		
62	Chava Alberstein – The Original Albums – four-CD set	2008		
