= List of Israeli films of 1990 =

== Films ==
This is a list of films produced by the Israeli film industry in 1990.

Premiere	Title	Director	Cast	Genre	Notes	Ref
April 20	Torn Apart	Jack Fisher	Hana Azoulay-Hasfari	Drama, Romance	Israeli-American co-production	

== Unknown premiere date ==
Premiere	Title	Director	Cast	Genre	Notes	Ref
?	After (Hebrew: אפטר)	Eytan Fox		Drama		
?	Ha-Mahtzeva (Hebrew: המחצבה, lit. "The quarry")	Ron Ninio	Uri Gavriel, Sasson Gabai, Hana Azoulay-Hasfari	Drama		
?	Derech Ha'nesher (Hebrew: דרך הנשר, lit. "Eagle's way")	Uri Barbash	Eli Danker, Gidi Gov, Nurit Galron	Drama		
?	The Appointed (Hebrew: המיועד, lit. "The Intended")	Daniel Wachsmann	Ronit Elkabetz, Shuli Rand	Drama	Israeli-French co-production	
?	Doomsday (Hebrew: הדרך לעין חרוד, lit. "The Road to Ein Harod")	Doron Eran	Tony Peck, Alessandra Mussolini, Arnon Zadok	Drama	Israeli-Italian-American co-production	
?	Neshika Bametzach (Hebrew: נשיקה במצ"ח, lit. "A kiss in the military police")	Sam Firstenberg	Yehuda Barkan, Michal Yannai	Comedy, Drama		
?	Nipagesh Basivuv (Hebrew: נפגש בסיבוב, lit. "We'll meet around the bend")	Yehuda Barkan and Ezra Shem-Tov	Yehuda Barkan	Comedy		
?	Neshika Bametzach (lit. "The Day We Met")	Sam Firstenberg	Yehuda Barkan, Rami Danon, Zachi Noy, Michal Yannai	Drama		

== See also ==
- 1990 in Israel
