= Cameri Theatre =

Israeli theatre company

Coordinates: 32°04′37″N 34°47′06″E

- התיאטרון הקאמרי
- HaTeatron HaKameri
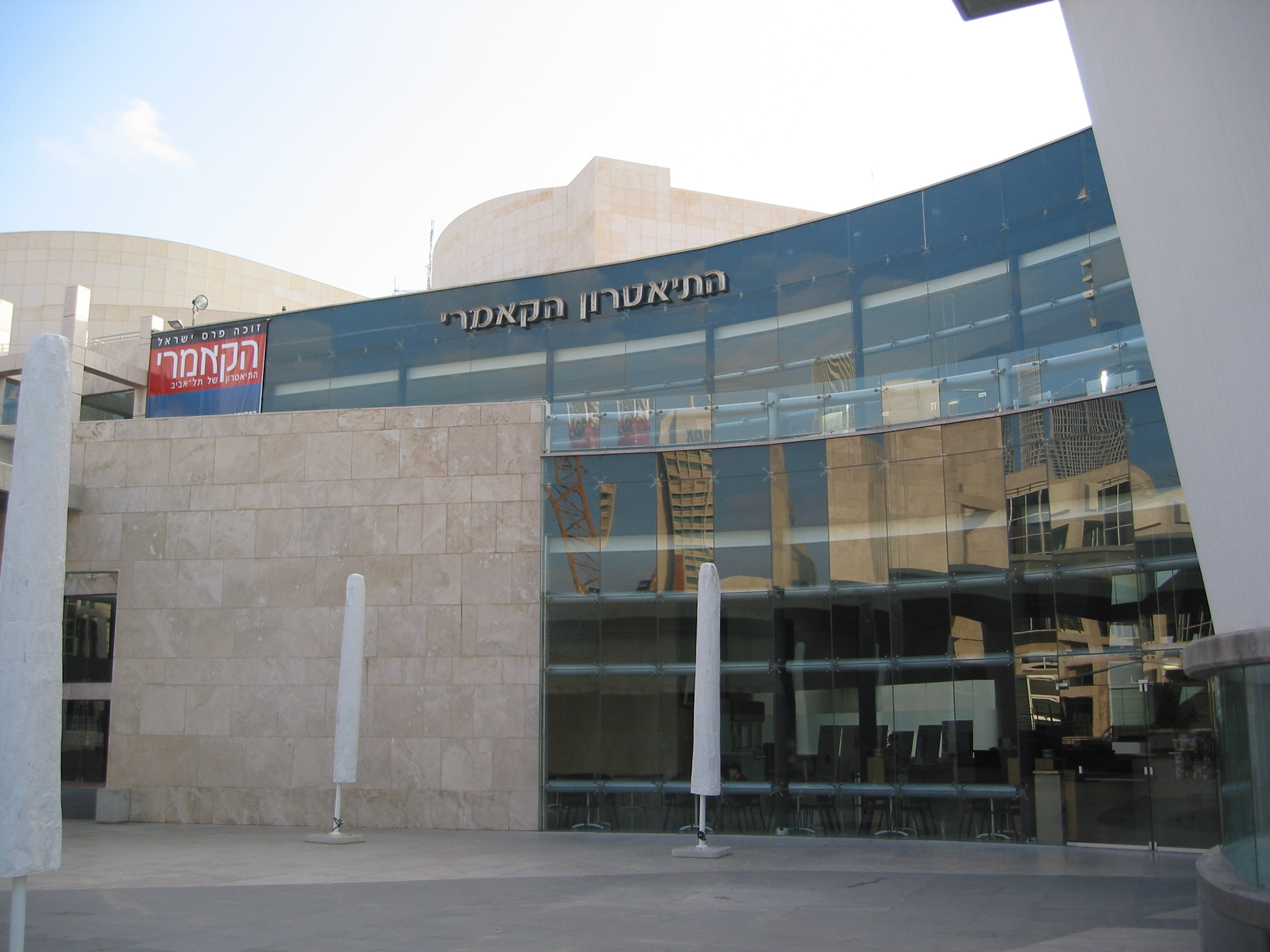
- Interactive map of Cameri Theatre
- Address: Tel Aviv Performing Arts Center; Tel Aviv; Israel
- Capacity: Cameri 1: 930 seats, Cameri 2: 430 seats, Black Box: 250 seats, Rehearsal Hall: 160 seats

Construction
- Opened: 1944

The Cameri Theatre (Hebrew: התיאטרון הקאמרי, HaTeatron HaKameri), established in 1944 in Tel Aviv, is one of the leading theatres in Israel, and is housed at the Tel Aviv Performing Arts Center.

== History ==
The Cameri Theatre was founded with the purpose of promoting local theatre, in contrast to Habima Theatre, which had roots in Russian theatre. The Cameri presented works about the daily life of persons in the fledgling state of Israel. The Cameri is the theatre where the Israeli nationalist play He Walked Through the Fields premiered just two weeks after the state of Israel was formally established in May 1948. He Walked Through the Fields, written by Moshe Shamir, was later adapted to film starring Moshe Dayan's youngest son Assi Dayan.

In 1964 the Cameri staged a celebrated musical version of Sammy Gronemann's comedy King Solomon and Shalmai the Cobbler, translated by Nathan Alterman with music by Sasha Argov. It became one of the most successful productions in the history of the Israeli theatre.

The Cameri, Tel Aviv's municipal theatre, stages up to ten new productions a year, in addition to its repertoire from previous years. The theatre has 34,000 subscribers and attracts 900,000 spectators annually.

In 2003, the Cameri moved into the Tel Aviv Performing Arts Center complex, adjacent to the New Israeli Opera, the Municipal Library and the Tel Aviv Museum of Art. The new theatre has five auditoriums: Cameri 1, the largest auditorium, has 930 seats; Cameri 2 has 430 seats, the Black Box seats 250, and the Rehearsal Hall seats 160.

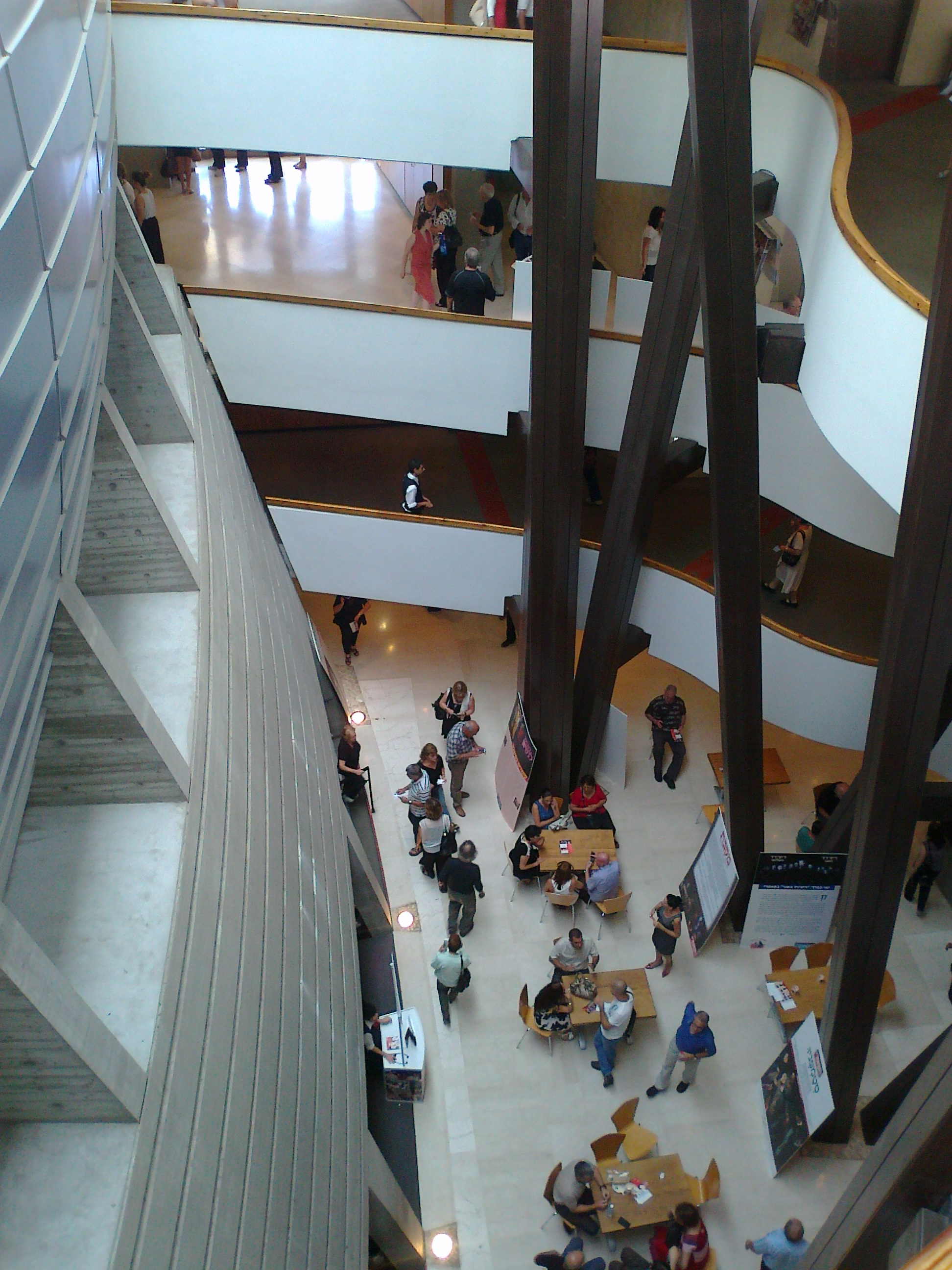
Cameri interior

The Cameri's social action programs include the Peace Foundation, which brings together young Israelis and Palestinians to watch theatre performances, and Theatre in Education, which brings high school students, university students and special needs audiences to the theatre. The Cameri also offers ticket subsidies for senior citizens and simultaneous translation of its productions into English, Russian and Arabic.

The art director of the Cameri Is Gilad Kimchi.

== Awards and recognition ==
In 2005, the Cameri won the Israel Prize, for its lifetime achievements and special contribution to society and the State of Israel.

== See also ==
- List of Israel Prize recipients
- Culture of Israel
