= List of Israeli films of 1991 =

This is a list of films produced by the Israeli film industry in 1991.

== 1991 releases ==
Premiere	Title	Director	Cast	Genre	Notes	Ref
November 1	Shuroo (Hebrew: שורו)	Savi Gavison	Moshe Ivgy, Keren Mor	Comedy		

=== Unknown premiere date ===
Premiere	Title	Director	Cast	Genre	Notes	Ref
?	Cup Final (Hebrew: גמר גביע, gmar gavi'a)	Eran Riklis	Moshe Ivgy, Mohammad Bakri	Drama	Entered into the 17th Moscow International Film Festival	
?	The War After (Hebrew: זמן אמת, lit. "Real Time")	Uri Barbash	Assi Dayan, Neta Moran, Hanna Meron	Drama		
?	Onat Haduvdevanim (Hebrew: עונת הדובדבנים, lit. "The Cherry Season")	Haim Bouzaglo	Gil Frank, Idit Teperson	Drama		
?	Wadi 1981-1991 (Hebrew: ואדי 1981-1991)	Amos Gitai		Documentary	Israeli-French-British co-production	
?	Abba Ganuv III (Hebrew: אבא גנוב 3, lit. "Superb dad 3")	Ayelet Menahemi	Yehuda Barkan, Ben Tzion	Drama		

== Awards ==
=== Ophir Award ===	=== Wolgin Award ===

== See also ==
- 1991 in Israel
