= Amos Kenan =

Israeli writer, journalist and artist (1927–2009)

- עמוס קינן
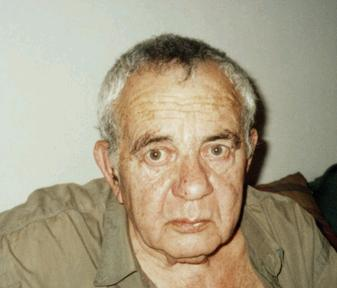
- Amos Kenan, November 2000
- Born: 2 May 1927; Tel Aviv, Mandatory Palestine
- Died: 4 August 2009 (aged 82); Tel Aviv, Israel
- Occupations: Columnist, painter, sculptor, playwright, novelist
- Notable work: The Road to Ein Harod
- Spouse: Nurith Gertz
- Children: 2, including Rona Kenan
- Awards: Sam Spiegel Prize (1962); Israel Cinema Council Prize (1970); French Ministry of Culture honorary award (1975); International Theater Institute Award (1995); Brenner Prize (1998)

Amos Kenan (Hebrew: עמוס קינן), also Amos Keinan (May 2, 1927 – August 4, 2009), was an Israeli columnist, painter, sculptor, playwright and novelist.

== Biography ==
Amos Levine (later Kenan) was born in south Tel Aviv. His parents were secular socialists. His father was a Gdud HaAvoda veteran and construction worker. At one point, the family lived in Argentina for several years when his father took work there. When the family returned, his father was injured in a work accident and subsequently became a clerk. He was a member of Hashomer Hatzair youth movement. In 1946 he met the poet Yonatan Ratosh and joined Ratosh's Canaanite movement, which he remained identified with until the early 1950s. He was among the founders of the movement's magazine, "Alef", in which he published his first book in 1949. Kenan dropped out of high school to become a factory worker.

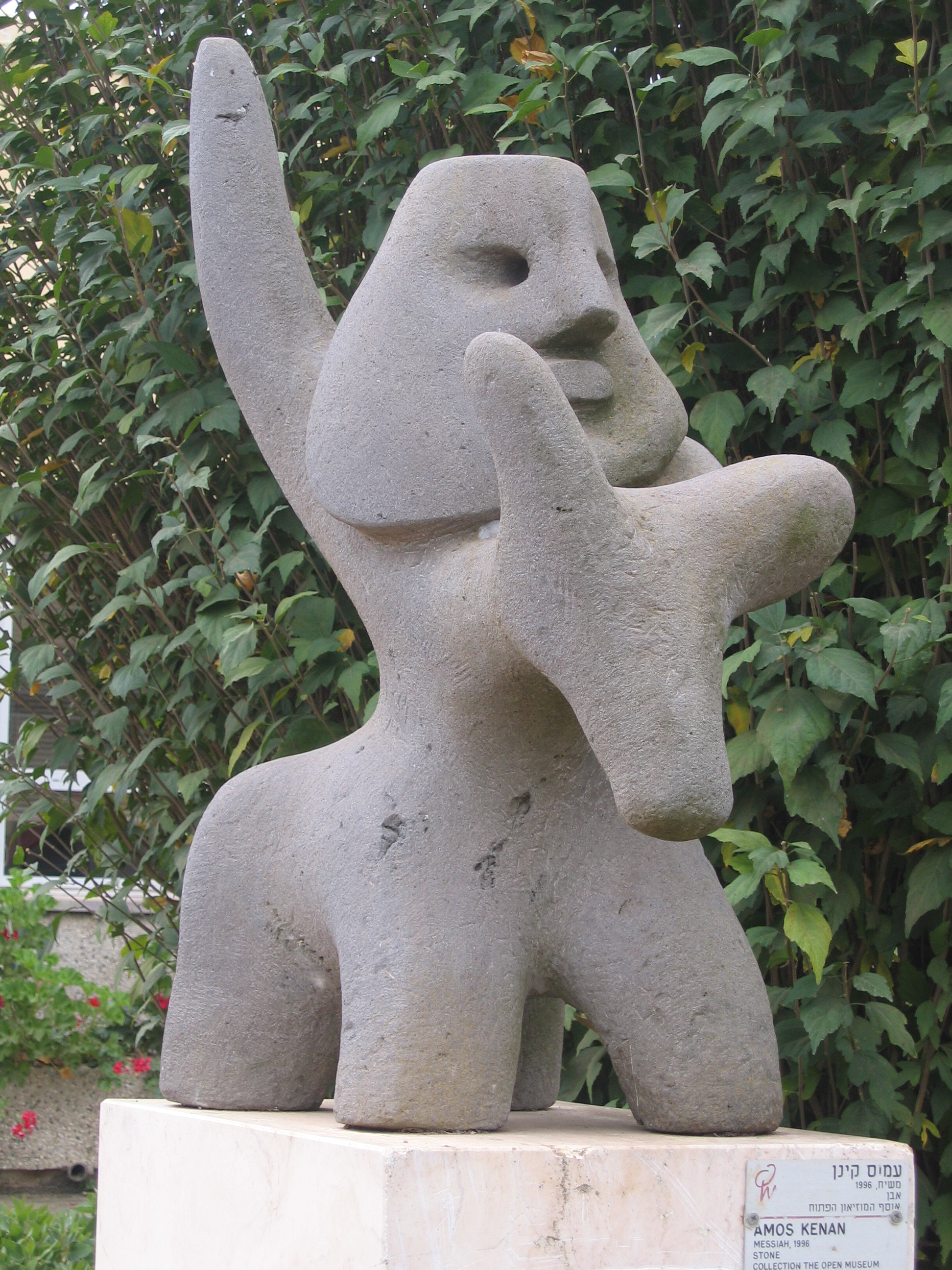
"Messiah" (1966)

Kenan was a member of the Lehi (לח״י - לוחמי חירות ישראל) underground, which the British authorities called “the Stern Gang.” In 1989 he told The Guardian: "I joined because it was an anti-imperialist and anti-colonialist organisation…We didn't fight the Arabs." During the 1948 Arab–Israeli War he fought in the 8th Brigade of the Israel Defense Forces, under the command of Yitzhak Sadeh, and was wounded. During the war he met Uri Avnery, who became his friend and colleague. Throughout his life, Kenan asserted that he did not attend the Deir Yassin massacre since he was wounded. When his wife, Prof. Nurith Gertz did her research for a biographical novel about him and as he was already suffering from Alzheimer's, he mentioned at one point that he may or may not have shot an Arab woman there. This remains, in the novel, part fantasy. The Independent's Daphna Baram writes that Kenan's account of the attack on the village and his role in it varied over the course of his life. According to Avnery, Kenan "always asserted that the massacre was not intended, or that it did not take place at all…He himself was wounded at the beginning of the action, he asserted, and did not see what happened." Historian Ilan Pappé writes that Kenan participated in the Al-Dawayima massacre. (Note: Ilan Pappé, The Ethnic Cleansing of Palestine (2006), "A well-known Israeli writer, Amos Keinan, who participated in the massacre, confirmed its existence in an interview he gave in the late 1990s to the Palestinian actor and film maker Muhammad Bakri, for Bakri’s documentary ‘1948’.")

From April 1950 until June 1952, Kenan wrote a satirical column in Haaretz called "Uzi & Co.", succeeding Benjamin Tammuz, who had started the column in 1948. "Uzi & Co.", regarded as the first anti-establishment column in Israel, took particular aim at the religious establishment. In 1952, Kenan was arrested, along with his friend and former Lehi colleague Shaltiel Ben-Yair, in connection with an assassination attempt on Israeli Transportation Minister, David-Zvi Pinkas, in the wake of Pinkas's decision to save fuel by prohibiting private car owners from driving on Shabbat. The two were arrested as they were leaving Pinkas' home, but said nothing under interrogation and were acquitted by the district court for lack of evidence. However, Haaretz publisher Gershom Schocken terminated his column. Kenan eventually told his wife, Nurith Gertz, as well as close friends and colleagues, that he really was involved in the bombing. In 2008 Gertz published a biography of Kenan in which she states this. He began writing for Tarzan Magazine under a pen name. In 1952 Kenan's "Uzi & Co." columns were collected in his first book, "With Whips and Scorpions."

From 1954 to 1962, Kenan lived in Paris, where he worked as a sculptor and published several plays drawing on the theater of the absurd. Pierre Alechinsky illustrated two of his books and Maurice Béjart adapted his plays, which were mounted in Paris and Switzerland. During that time he wrote a column for Avnery's magazine Haolam Hazeh, called "The Wandering Knife", and a column called "Sparks from the city of lights" for Yediot Aharonot. His writing was translated into French by his partner, Christiane Rochefort. Rochefort's first novel, Warrior's Rest, was inspired by Kenan. In Paris Kenan participated in meetings between Arabs and Israelis (mostly Communists, although Kenan was not) arranged by the Egyptian Communist emigre Henri Curiel. He also arranged a meeting between himself, Avnery, and Jean-Paul Sartre in which Sartre (in Avnery's account) praised the Israeli left. Kenan was a member of Avnery's political group Semitic Action.

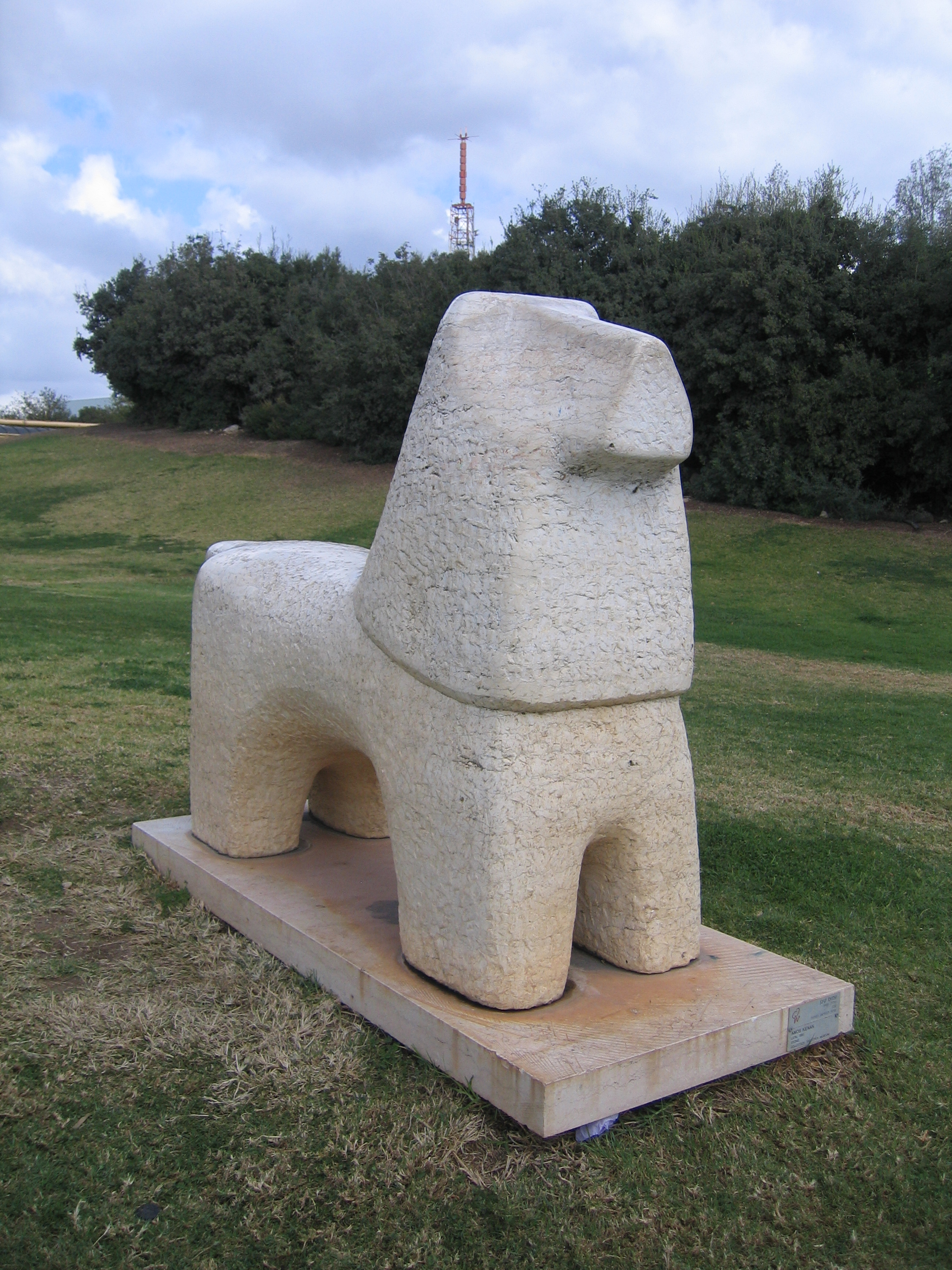
"Lion" (1992)

He returned to Israel in 1962 and began writing a weekly column in Yediot Aharonot that ran for forty years. In 1962, Kenan married Nurith Gertz, a literary scholar. They had two daughters, the journalist Shlomzion Kenan and the poet and singer/songwriter Rona Kenan. He was also the paper's food critic. He edited a newspaper named "Tzipor HaNefesh" ("The bird of the soul") with Dahn Ben-Amotz, and contributed articles to The New York Times and The Nation. After the Six-Day War he was sent by the Israeli Ministry of Foreign Affairs to interview intellectuals such as Jean-Paul Sartre, Herbert Marcuse and Noam Chomsky on the Israeli-Palestinian Conflict. The World Zionist Organization arranged a lecture tour of American universities, intended to combat the increasingly anti-Israel stance of the campus left.

During the 1970s he directed several films, including How Wonderful. He wrote songs for Arik Lavi, The High Windows, HaGashash HaHiver and others. His play "The Lost Train" was presented in the Cameri Theater. He wrote the screenplay to Uri Zohar's film, A Hole in the Moon and acted in Moshé Mizrahi's film Customer of the Off Season. His plays include The Lion, The Balloon, Maybe It's An Earthquake, Something Not Normal, Friends Talk About Jesus and Still Believe in You. Friends Talk About Jesus was revoked by the Supreme Court of Israel in 1972. The court ruled that it was "a repulsive mix of desecration of the Christian faith". It also said that "a writer or playwright to lash out to his heart's content at fallen religious figures through the use of criticism or satire, but that portraying God himself on stage in a way that is contemptuous of believers' faith is beyond the bounds of what is legally permissible here". In the 1970s, Kenan was a member of the Israeli Council for Israeli-Palestinian Peace. In the late 1970s he joined Ariel Sharon's short-lived Shlomtzion Party, named after Kenan's daughter.

During the 1980s, Kenan participated and moderated talks with Palestinian writers and PLO officials on behalf of the United Nations in Kinshasa, Senegal and Bangladesh amongst other countries, as part of the "Committee on the Exercise of the Inalienable Rights of the Palestinian People."

In 1984 he published The Road to Ein Harod, a dystopian novel which portrays a future Israel in the grip of a civil war following a military coup. It was translated into eight languages and was adapted into a film in 1990.

His book To Your Country, To Your Homeland served as a basis for Moti Kirschenbaum's documentary series To the Water Wells, which portrayed a meeting between two patriots in disagreement — Kenan and Naomi Shemer. He translated The Good Soldier Švejk into Hebrew. In the 1980s he was the curator of the Tefen Open Museum. His paintings and sculptures have been displayed in various galleries in Israel. In 1995, Kenan and Yediot Aharonot were fined for two articles Kenan wrote during the First Intifada criticizing light sentences handed out for violence against Palestinians; Kenan was fined 1000 shekels, the newspaper 7500.

Kenan died in Tel Aviv in 2009, and was buried at Kibbutz Einat. He had struggled for years with Alzheimer's disease.

== Awards and commemoration ==
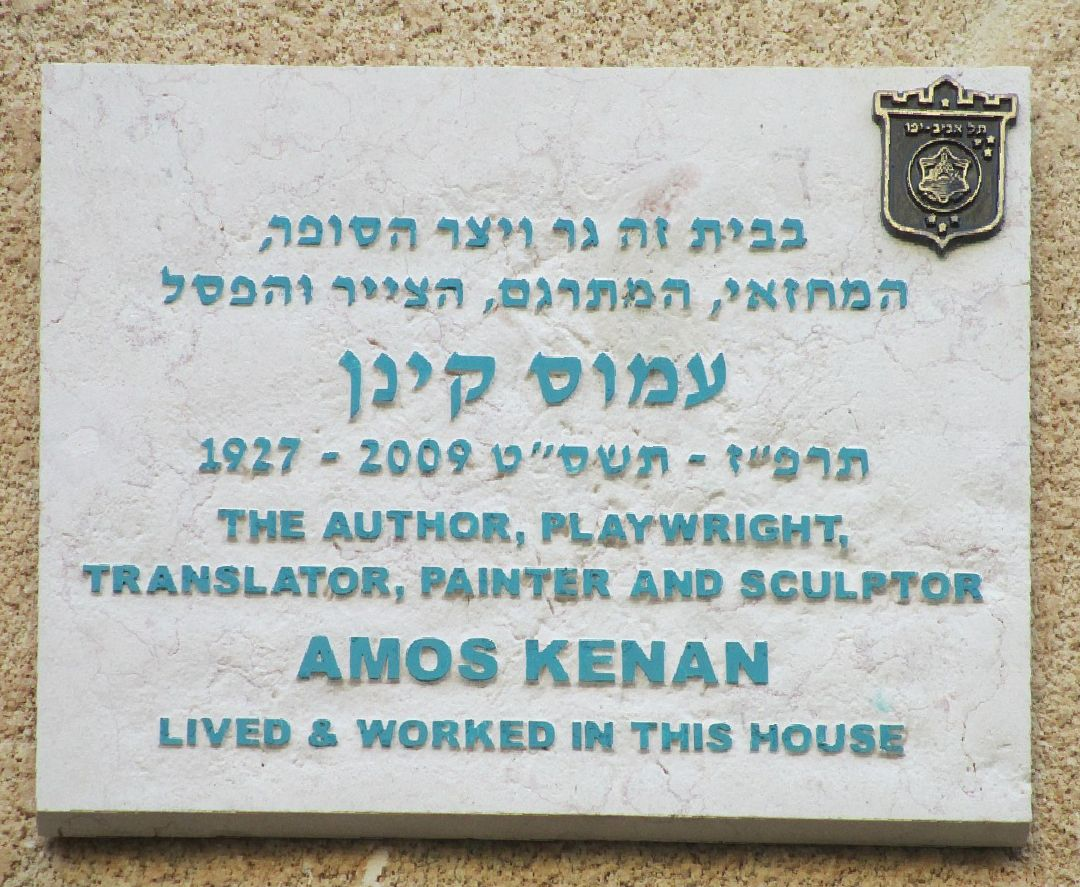
Memorial plaque in Tel Aviv

- In 1962, the Sam Spiegel Prize.
- In 1970, the Israel Cinema Council Prize.
- In 1975, an honorary award by the French Ministry of Culture.
- In 1995, the International Theater Institute Award.
- In 1998, the Brenner Prize.
- In 2008, Gertz published Al Da'at Atzmo (Unrepentant: Four chapters in the life of Amos Kenan), an account of Kenan's early life, ending with his years in Paris. In 2009, Rona Kenan released an album called "Songs for Joel" loosely based on Kenan's life story.

== Published works ==
Books in Hebrew

- With Whips and Scorpions (satire), Tel Aviv, 1952 [Be-Shotim U-ve-Akrabim]
- At the Station (prose), Ladori, 1963 [Ba-Tahanah]
- Book of Pleasures (non-fiction), Levin-Epstein, 1968 [Sefer Ha-ta`anugot]
- The Blue Door (novella), Schocken, 1972 [Ha-Delet ha-Kehulah]
- Shoah II (prose), A.L., 1975 [Shoah 2]
- Under the Flowers (stories), Prosa, 1979 [Mitahat la-Prahim]
- On Your Country, On Your Homeland (non-fiction), Edanim, 1981 [El Artzech, El Moladetech]
- The Book of Satire (satire), Keter, 1984 [Sefer ha-Satirot]
- The Road to Ein Harod (novel), Am Oved, 1984 [Ha-Derech le-Ein Harod]
- Love in the End (novel), Keter, 1988 [Et vahev be-Sufah]
- Tulips our Brothers (stories), Keter, 1989 [Tziv`onim Aheinu]
- Poems, Tag, 1995 [Shirim]
- Block 23 (novellas), Zmora Bitan, 1996 [Block 23]
- Rose of Jericho (essays), Zmora Bitan, 1998 [Shoshanat Yericho]
- End of Reptile Era (poetry), Zmora Bitan, 1999 [Ketz Idan ha-Zochalim]
- The Escape to Prison (stories), Zmora Bitan, 2003 [Habricha el Hakele]

Books translated into English

- Kenan, Amos (2001-02-01). The Road To Ein Harod. Saqi Books. p. 114. ISBN 0-86356-002-4.

Performed Plays

- The Lion
- The Balloon, 1959
- The Lost Train, 1969
- Maybe It's An Earthquake, 1970
- Something Not Normal [Ohel, 1970]
- Friends Talk About Jesus
- Still Believe in You [Cameri, 1974]

== See also ==
- Visual arts in Israel
- Sculpture in Israel
