= List of Israeli films of 1992 =

A list of films produced by the Israeli film industry in 1992.

== 1992 releases ==
Premiere	Title	Director	Cast	Genre	Notes	Ref
February 20	Cup Final (Hebrew: גמר גביע)	Eran Riklis	Moshe Ivgy, Mohammad Bakri, Salim Dau, Bassam Zo'amat	Drama, War		

=== Unknown premiere date ===
Premiere	Title	Director	Cast	Genre	Notes	Ref
?	Kvalim (Hebrew: כבלים, lit. "Cables")	Tzvi Shissel	Arik Einstein, Moni Moshonov	Comedy		
?	Life According to Agfa (Hebrew: החיים על פי אגפא)	Assi Dayan	Gila Almagor	Drama	Entered into the 43rd Berlin International Film Festival	
?	Me'Ahorei Hasoragim II (Hebrew: מאחורי הסורגים 2, lit. "Beyond the Walls II")	Uri Barbash	Mohammad Bakri, Arnon Zadok	Drama		
?	Sipurei Tel-Aviv (Hebrew: סיפורי תל-אביב, lit. "Tel Aviv Stories")	Ayelet Menahemi and Nirit Yaron	Yael Abecassis, Ruthi Goldberg, Ruthi Goldberg, Anat Waxman	Comedy, Drama, Romance		
?	Tipat Mazal (Hebrew: טיפת מזל, lit. "A Bit of Luck")	Ze'ev Revach	Zahava Ben	Drama		
?	Lelakek Tatut (Hebrew: ללקק ת'תות, lit. "Licking the Raspberry")	Uri Barbash	Aki Avni, Uri Banai, Uri Gottlieb, Albert Iluz	Musical		
?	Geveret Tiftehi, Ze Ani (Hebrew: גברת תפתחי זה אני, lit. "Lady, Open Up, It's Me")	Yehuda Barkan	Yehuda Barkan	Comedy		
?	Na'arei Hahof (Hebrew: נערי החוף, lit. "The Beach Boys")	Tzury Mimon	Aki Avni	Drama		

== Awards ==
=== Ophir Award ===	=== Wolgin Award ===

== See also ==
- 1992 in Israel
