= 1992 in Israel =

- Decades: 1970s; 1980s; 1990s; 2000s; 2010s
- See also: History of Israel; Timeline of Israeli history; List of years in Israel

Events in the year 1992 in Israel.

== Incumbents ==
- President of Israel – Chaim Herzog
- Prime Minister of Israel – Yitzhak Shamir (Likud) until 13 July, Yitzhak Rabin (Israeli Labor Party)
- President of the Supreme Court – Meir Shamgar
- Chief of General Staff – Ehud Barak
- Government of Israel – 24th Government of Israel until 13 July, 25th Government of Israel

== Events ==
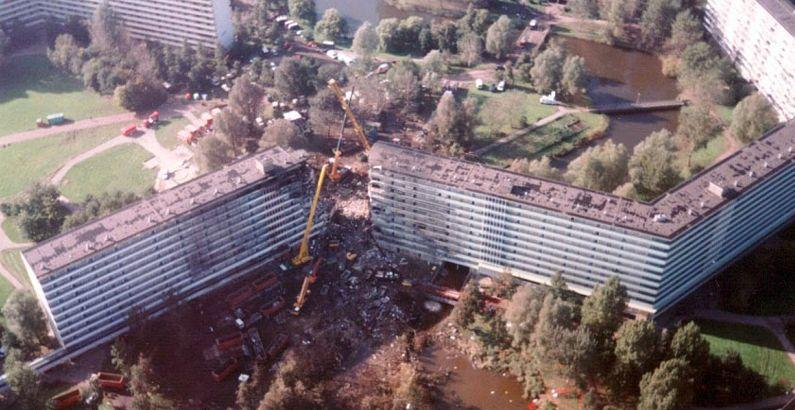
Aftermath of the Bijlmerramp disaster

- 24 January – Israel and People's Republic of China first established diplomatic relations.
- 16 February – Israeli forces assassinates of Abbas al-Musawi, a Hezbollah leader, in southern Lebanon, also killing his wife, his son and four bodyguards.
- 7 March – Ehud Sadan, the security chief for the Israeli embassy in Ankara, is assassinated in a car bombing.
- 9 March – The Israeli left-wing political party Meretz is formed by an alliance of three left-wing parties; Ratz, Mapam and Shinui, and is initially led by Shulamit Aloni.
- 9 May – Dafna Dekel represents Israel at the Eurovision Song Contest with the song “Ze Rak Sport” ("It’s Just Sport"), achieving sixth place.
- 23 June – The Elections for the 13th Knesset are held in Israel. The result is a victory for Yitzhak Rabin's Israeli Labor Party.
- 13 July – Yitzhak Rabin presents his cabinet for a Knesset "Vote of Confidence". The 25th Government is approved that day and the members are sworn in.
- 28 July – Carmelit reopened after intensive renovation from 1986.
- 30 July – Yael Arad wins a silver medal in judo in the 1992 Summer Olympics. This was the first Olympic medal won by an Israeli athlete.
- 4 October – The Bijlmerramp disaster: El Al Flight 1862, a Boeing 747 freighter, crashes into high-rise apartment buildings in Amsterdam after two of its engines detach from the wing. A total of 43 people were killed, consisting of the plane's crew of three and a non-revenue passenger in a jump seat, plus 39 persons on the ground. Many more were injured.
- 5 November – Tze'elim II disaster: 5 Sayeret Matkal soldiers die in an accident while training for a military operation.

=== Israeli–Palestinian conflict ===
The most prominent events related to the Israeli–Palestinian conflict which occurred during 1992 include:

- 27 September to 11 October – Palestinian prisoners' hunger strike thousands of Palestinians held in Israeli prisons carry out a hunger strike demanding better treatment. The strike sparked demonstrations throughout Palestinian territories and lead do the death of one prisoner.
- 17 December – Israel deports 415 Hamas activists to Lebanon.

Notable Palestinian militant operations against Israeli targets

The most prominent Palestinian Arab terror attacks committed against Israelis during 1992 include:

- 14 February – Night of the Pitchforks (ליל הקילשונים): Three Israeli soldiers are killed by Israeli Arabs at a military recruit training base near Kibbutz Gal'ed.
- 17 March – A suicide car-bomb explodes at the Israeli Embassy in Buenos Aires, Argentina, killing 29 and injuring 242.
- 24 May – 15-year-old Israeli Helena Rapp is stabbed to death by 18-year-old Palestinian Fuad Muhammad Abdulhadi Amrin at her school bus stop in Bat Yam.
- 22 September – Magavnik Avinoam Peretz, is shot and killed by an Al-Qassam Brigades gunman in French Hill in northeastern Jerusalem. Hamas claimed responsibility for the assassination.
- 13 December – Hamas activists kidnap and kill an Israeli Border Police officer, Nissim Toledano. This event precipitated Israel's decision to deport 415 Hamas activists to Lebanon four days later.

Notable Israeli militant operations against Palestinian
The most prominent Israeli military operations carried out against Palestinians during 1992 include:

- 17 February – Israel bombs the Ain Hilwe and Rashidiye Palestinian refugee camps in southern Lebanon that kills four people, including two children, and wounds about another dozen in retaliation for the killing of three Israeli soldiers.
- 10 October – One Palestinian is killed and 49 injured as the IDF tried to disperse protests in the West Bank, East Jerusalem and Gaza in solidarity with the prisoner's hunger strike.

== Notable births ==
- 14 January – Ahad Azam, footballer.
- 21 June – Lucy Ayoub, Arab-Israeli journalist
- 4 June – Matan Balestra, footballer.
- 17 May – Sagi Muki, judoka
- 16 August – Adi Gotlieb, footballer.
- 16 September – Niv Sultan, actress
- 9 December – Sean Labanowski, basketball player.

== Notable deaths ==
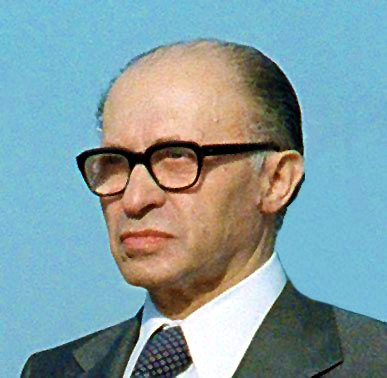
Menachem Begin

- 9 March – Menachem Begin (born 1913), Russian (Belarus)-born Prime Minister of Israel, recipient of the Nobel Peace Prize.
- 18 June – Mordecai Ardon (born 1896), Austro-Hungarian (Galicia)-born Israeli painter.
- 22 July – Ya'akov Hazan (born 1899), Russian (Belarus)-born Israeli politician and social activist.
- 10 August – Shimon Agranat (born 1906), American-born former President of the Supreme Court of Israel.
- Full date unknown
  - Dina Feitelson (born 1926), Austrian-born Israeli educator.
  - Gad Tedeschi (born 1907) Italian-born Israeli jurist.

== See also ==
- 1992 in Israeli film
- 1992 in Israeli television
- 1992 in Israeli music
- 1992 in Israeli sport
- Israel in the Eurovision Song Contest 1992
- Israel at the 1992 Summer Olympics
