= 1990 in Israel =

- Decades: 1970s; 1980s; 1990s; 2000s; 2010s
- See also: History of Israel; Timeline of Israeli history; List of years in Israel

Events in the year 1990 in Israel.

== Incumbents ==
- President of Israel – Chaim Herzog
- Prime Minister of Israel – Yitzhak Shamir (Likud)
- President of the Supreme Court – Meir Shamgar
- Chief of General Staff – Dan Shomron
- Government of Israel – 23rd Government of Israel until 11 June, 24th Government of Israel

== Events ==
- 22 February – USSR announce that they will not allow direct commercial flights to Israel.
- 27 February – Poland resumes diplomatic relations with Israel.
- 15 March – The dirty trick: Yitzhak Shamir's government is dissolved by a non-confidence vote of 60 to 55 in the Knesset. The Agudat Yisrael party votes for the motion, while the Shas party abstains. It is the only time in Israeli history that a government is dissolved by a motion of no confidence. The vote was 60 to 55.
- 28 March – The US House of Foreign Affairs committee approve a $400,000,000 loan for housing Soviet Jews in Israel.
- 29 March – The senior Israeli officer, Col. Yehuda Meir, who was accused of ordering soldiers to "systematically break the bones" of nearly two dozen bound Palestinian demonstrators, denied the eight charges filed against him in the court martial proceedings, which included abuse, intentionally causing serious damage and behavior unacceptable for an officer.
- 3 April – The Israeli reconnaissance satellite Ofek-2 is launched.
- 11 April – The dirty trick: Shimon Peres' new government is to be approved on this day. However, at the last moment, it is revealed that two Agudat Yisrael MKs are absent and therefore not going to support the motion to approve the new government, following Rabbi Menachem Mendel Schneerson's ruling not to support any concession of territory by Israel.
- 26 April – Israel's Supreme Court ordered the evacuation of 20 Jewish settlers, which provoked an international outcry when they moved to a building in the Christian Quarter of the Old City of Jerusalem.
- 3 May – Bulgaria resumes diplomatic relations with Israel.
- 5 May – Rita represents Israel at the Eurovision Song Contest with the song “Shara Barkhovot” ("Singing in the Streets").
- 14 May – Rabbi Moshe Levinger, who shot and killed the Palestinian store owner Khayed Salah and injured the customer Ibrahim Bali when he was attacked by stone throwers in the center of the city Hebron on 30 September 1988, was convicted after signing a plea bargain. Levinger was sentenced to five months in prison.
- 20 May – Ami Popper, a former dishonorably-discharged Israeli soldier, kills seven Palestinians Arab workers from the Gaza Strip in the Israeli town of Rishon Lezion. Popper committed the murder with a rifle that he stole from his soldier brother.
- 11 June – Yitzhak Shamir presents his new government.
- 17 July – Tze'elim I disaster: Five IDF reserve soldiers are killed in an accident during a joint artillery and infantry military training in the Tze'elim army base.
- 28 July – On a Tel Aviv beach, a bomb exploded killing Marnie Kimelman, a 17-year-old Canadian tourist.
- 18 October – The serial bank robber Ronnie Leibowitz, nicknamed "Ofnobank" (a combination of the words "motorcycle" and "bank" in Hebrew), is captured.
- 5 November – Meir Kahane, American-Israeli rabbi, former Knesset member, and ultra-nationalist writer, is assassinated in a Manhattan hotel, after concluding a speech warning American Jews to emigrate to Israel before it was "too late."

=== Israeli–Palestinian conflict ===
The most prominent events related to the Israeli–Palestinian conflict which occurred during 1990 include:

Notable Palestinian militant operations against Israeli targets

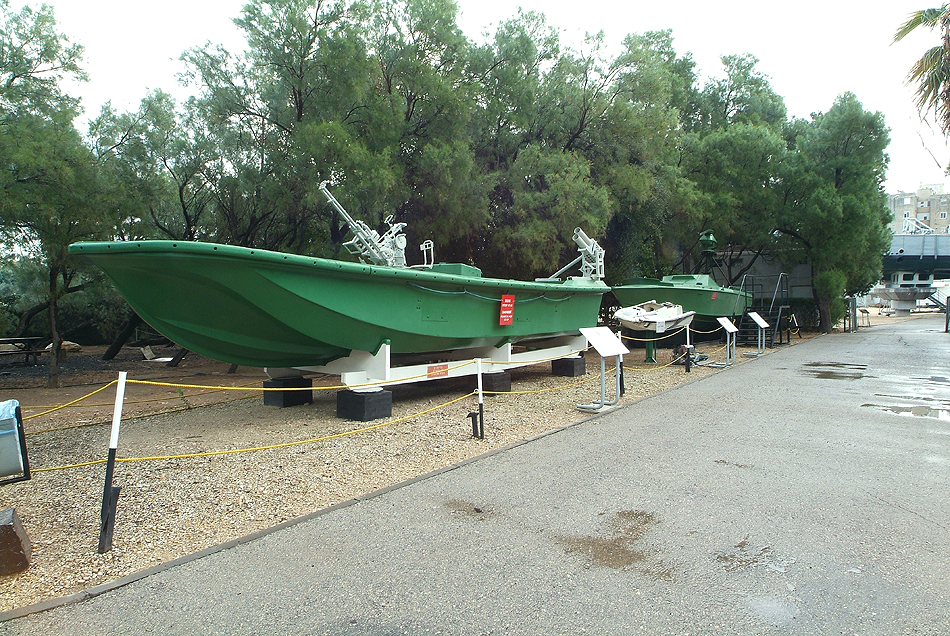
A boat belonging to the Palestinian Liberation Front captured on 30 May 1990 at the Nitzanim beach.

The most prominent acts of Palestinian attacks against Israelis during 1990 include:

- 30 May – PLF militants attempt an attack on Nitzanim beach, near Tel Aviv with speedboats. Israeli ships and aircraft intercepted the militants, killing four militants and capturing 12.

Notable Israeli military operations against Palestinian militancy targets

The most prominent Israeli military counter-terrorism operations (military campaigns and military operations) carried out against Palestinian militants during 1990 include:

- 16 March – Israeli army kill three alleged DFLP members in the South Lebanon security zone.

=== Unknown dates ===
- The founding of the community settlement Avshalom.

== Births ==
- 1 January – Julia Glushko, tennis player
- 31 January – Eliad Nachum, Israeli singer
- 18 August – Or Sasson, Israeli judoka
- 19 October – Daniel Litman, Israeli film and television actor
- 8 December – Static, Singer

== Notable deaths ==
- 9 January – Shlomo Pines (born 1908), French-born Israeli scholar of Jewish and Islamic philosophy.
- 20 February – Verdina Shlonsky (born 1905), Russian (Ukraine)-born Israeli composer, pianist, and piano teacher.
- 30 June – Hillel Omer (born 1926), Israeli poet and writer.
- 5 November – Meir Kahane (born 1932), American-born Israeli rabbi and ultra-nationalist writer and political figure.
- Full date unknown – Karl Frankenstein (born 1905), German-born Israeli professor in special education and pedagogy.

== See also ==
- 1990 in Israeli film
- 1990 in Israeli television
- 1990 in Israeli music
- 1990 in Israeli sport
- Israel in the Eurovision Song Contest 1990
