= Yehuda Fox =

Israeli major general (born 1969)

- יהודה פוקס
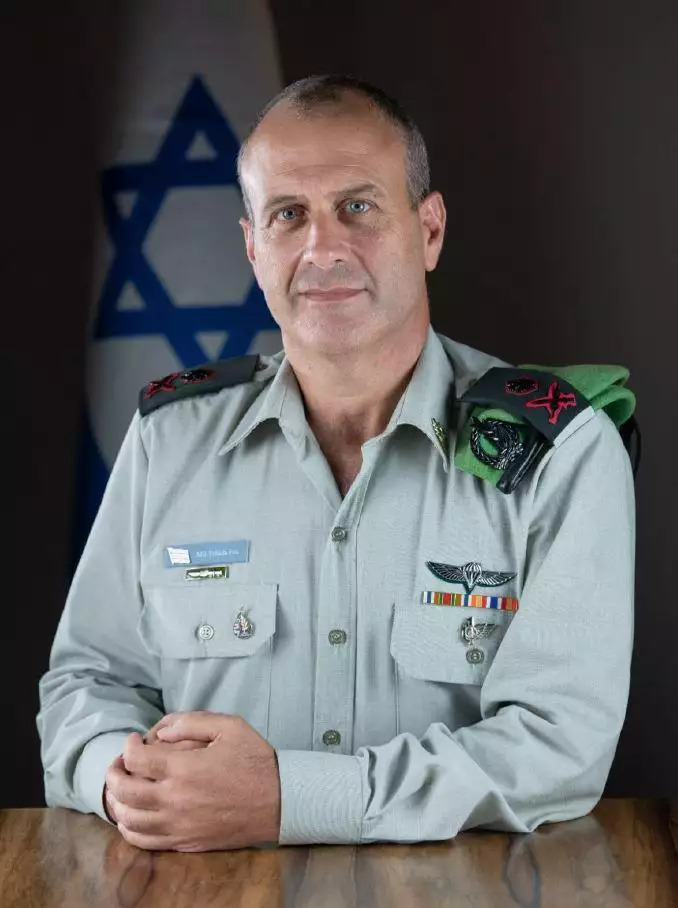
- Born: 10 April 1969 (age 57); Israel
- Military career
- Allegiance: Israel
- Branch: Israel Defense Forces
- Service years: 1987–present
- Rank: Major general
- Unit: Nahal Brigade
- Commands: 931st Nahal infantry battalion, Judea Regional Brigade, IDF's Officer Candidate School, Nahal Brigade, head of the Paratroopers and Infantry Corps, Gaza Division, Military Attaché to the United States
- Conflicts: South Lebanon conflict (1985–2000); First Intifada; Second Intifada; Operation Defensive Shield; 2006 Lebanon War; Operation Cast Lead; Operation Pillar of Defense; Operation Protective Edge

Yehuda Fox (also Yehuda Fuchs, Hebrew: יהודה פוקס; born 10 April 1969) is an Israeli major general who commanded the Central Command of the Israel Defense Forces (IDF) until 2024. Previously, he commanded the Gaza Division of the (IDF).

== Military career ==
Fox is the son of Rabbi David Fox, a native of Chicago. His cousins are film director Eytan Fox and lawyer David Fox. He was drafted into the IDF in 1987. He volunteered as a paratrooper in the Paratroopers Brigade. He served as a soldier and a squad leader. He became an infantry officer after completing Officer Candidate School. Afterwards, he transferred to the Nahal Brigade and served as a platoon leader and as a company commander. Fox led the Brigade's anti-tank company in counter-guerrilla operations in South Lebanon, commanded a Nahal battalion in counter-terror operations in the Second Intifada. Later he commanded the Judea Regional Brigade (434th Territorial Brigade "Yehuda" of the Judea and Samaria Division), IDF's Officer Candidate School, and the Nahal Brigade. In 2014, he was appointed head of the Paratroopers and Infantry Corps, and in 2016, commander of the Gaza Division.

In 2019, Fox was appointed IDF's next military attaché in the United States. In 2021, he replaced the outgoing commander of Central Command. In April 2024, Israeli media has announced he is stepping down from his position in the summer; however, it did not specify the reason behind Fox’s planned resignation, which was announced hours after Aharon Haliva resigned over his failure to predict the Hamas attack.

== Retirement ==
In his retirement speech in July 2024, Fox described his feelings of guilt in the face of the army’s failure in preventing October 7 massacre. He also criticised some of the Israeli settler leaders in the occupied West Bank:

“The great majority of settlers are law-abiding citizens who live in the shadow of the threat of terror... Unfortunately, in recent months, nationalist crime has reared its head under the cover of war and has led to revenge and sowed calamity and fear in Palestinian residents who do not pose any threat. To my dismay, the local leadership and the spiritual leadership for the most part did not see the threat as we did. It is intimidated and has not found the strength to come out openly and act in accordance with the values of Judaism... Even if the perpetrators are few in number, those who have remained silent have failed to isolate them and their actions from the majority. This isn’t Judaism in my eyes – at least it’s not the one I grew up with in my father’s and mother’s house.”
