= List of Israeli films of 1993 =

A list of films produced by the Israeli film industry in 1993.

== 1993 releases ==
Premiere	Title	Director	Cast	Genre	Notes	Ref
October 12	Ha-Dod Peretz Mamri (Hebrew: אישה זרה, lit. "Foreign woman")	Michal Bat-Adam	Michal Bat-Adam	Drama, Romance		

=== Unknown premiere date ===
Premiere	Title	Director	Cast	Genre	Notes	Ref
?	Dummy in a Circle (Hebrew: גולם במעגל)	Aner Preminger	Hagit Dasberg	Drama, Music		
?	Groupie (Hebrew: גרופי)	Nadav Levitan	Mili Avital, Dana Dvorin	Drama		
?	Ha-Yerusha (Hebrew: הירושה, lit. "The Heritage")	Amnon Rubinstein	Yael Abecassis, Alon Aboutboul, Avi Toledano	Drama, Romance		
?	The Revenge of Itzik Finkelstein (Hebrew: נקמתו של איציק פינקלשטיין)	Enrique Rottenberg	Moshe Ivgy	Comedy, Fantasy		
?	Sheleg B'Ogust (Hebrew: שלג באוגוסט, lit. "August Snow")	Hagai Levi	Rami Heuberger	Drama		
?	Zohar (Hebrew: זהר)	Eran Riklis	Shaul Mizrahi, Dafna Dekel, Juliano Mer	Biography, Drama		
?	Mehapeset Baal Al Arba (Hebrew: מחפשת בעל על ארבע, lit. "Looking for a four-legged husband")	Shimon Azulai	Yehuda Barkan	Comedy		

== Awards ==
=== Ophir Award ===	=== Wolgin Award ===

== Notable deaths ==
- February 16 – Amos Gutman, Israeli film director (b. 1954)

== See also ==
- 1993 in Israel
