= Rona Kenan =

Israeli singer-songwriter (born 1979)

Rona Kenan רונה קינן
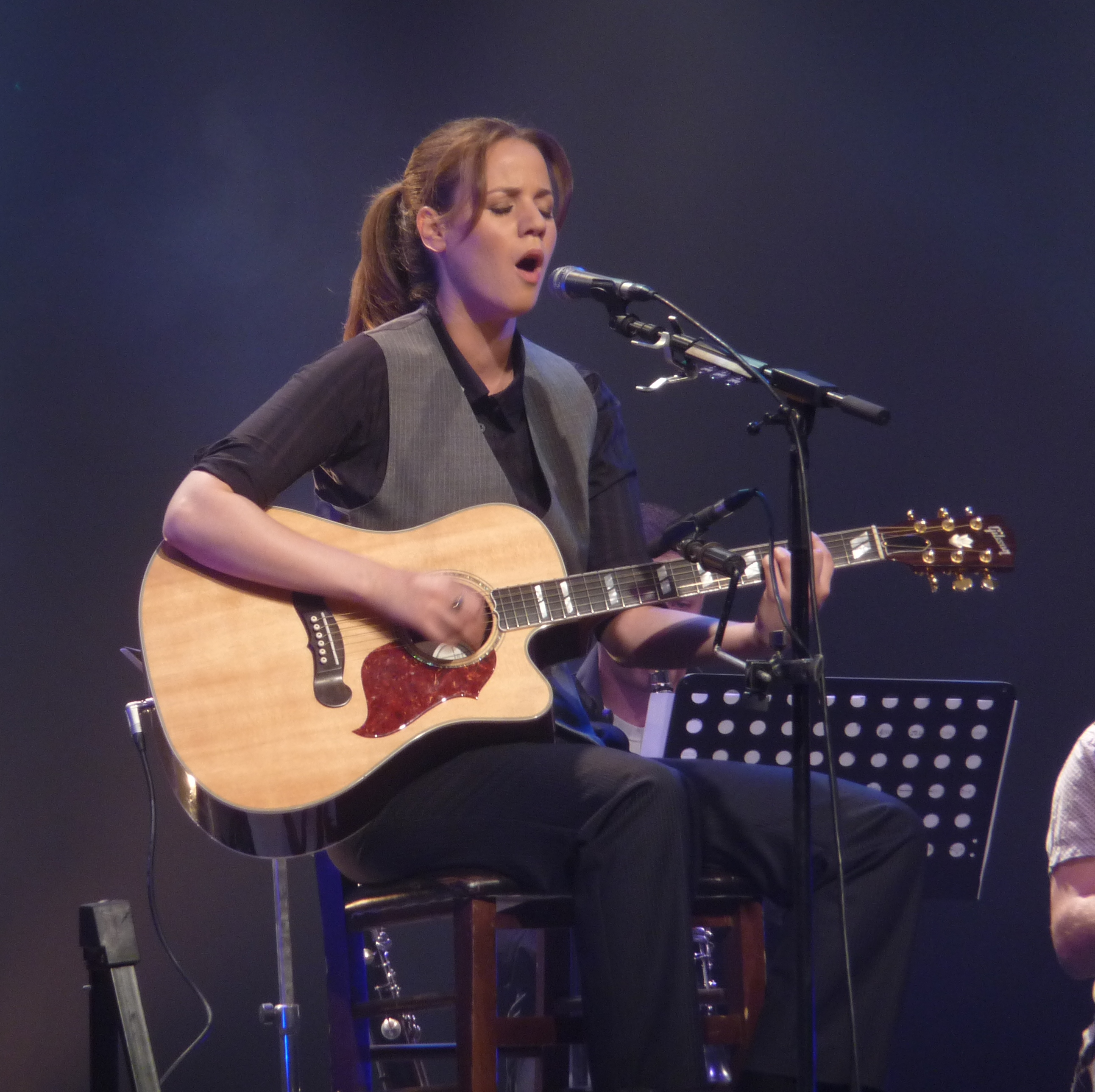
- Kenan on stage at the Israel Festival, 2009, Jerusalem.

Background information
- Born: 26 July 1979 (age 46); Jaffa, Israel
- Origin: Tel Aviv
- Genres: Singer-songwriter
- Instruments: Vocals; guitar
- Years active: 1990s–present
- Label: NMC Music
- Website: www.ronakenan.co.il

Rona (Aharona) Rachel Kenan (Hebrew: רונה קינן; born 26 July 1979) is an Israeli singer-songwriter.

== Biography ==
Kenan was born on 26 July 1979. Her father is the late Amos Kenan and her mother is the scholar Nurith Gertz. She was attracted to music at a young age and learned to play the guitar. She graduated from the theater program at Thelma Yellin High School of the Arts, but preferred a musical career. At the age of eighteen she was considered a "discovery". She has cited the Beatles (particularly the song Blackbird), Leah Goldberg, The Pixies, Pina Bausch and Thelma Yellin as early influences.

In 1997 she participated in a song festival called Next, organized by musician Eran Tzur, in which she recomposed and performed songs by poet Yona Wallach. She also performed in an evening commemorating Inbal Perlmutter, a young poets' event, and an evening of Leah Goldberg's poetry. She played with several Israeli musicians, including Tal Gordon, Dana Berger and Asi Levi. In 1999 she and Gordon became a duo and recorded an album titled I Didn't Want It to End: Tal Gordon Hosting Rona Kenan. Kenan co-composed four of the album's songs. The album tour went on until late 2000. In 2001 she started touring solo with a show which included two instrument players beside her. She sang and promoted four songs that came out as a single. She sang mostly in English.

In 2002, she kept collecting material for her debut album and started working hard with Izhar Ashdot as producer. In 2003, she began appearing with her trio in Tel Aviv, along with multi-instrumentalist Adam Scheflan and drummer Omri Hanegbi. She released three songs from the album: "Ahava Shkufa" ("Transparent Love"), "Lichyot Nachon" ("To Live Right") and "Mabul" ("Flood"). In 2004, she released her debut, "Linshom Bisphira Le'achor" ("Breathing Down to Zero"). The album included eleven original tracks in both Hebrew and English, a cover version of a Yaakov Orland song, and an instrumental track titled "Hatzama Vehara'av" ("Thirst and Hunger"). The album featured guest appearances by Maya Dunietz, Shlomi Shaban and Berry Sakharof. She said it was a challenge to write in her native language. After the album's release, she entered a state of deep depression. Her health deteriorated and she had to cancel shows. Taking Ashdot's advice, she moved back with her parents to recover. They decided not to share what she was going through with almost anyone.

She wrote the music for several of Israeli films and television series, including "The Cemetery Club", a documentary film directed by Tali Shemesh. In 2006 she released the first single from her second album, the title song "Einayim Zarot" ("Through Foreign Eyes"), and in early 2007 the second single from that album "Hapa'am Ha'acharona" ("The Last Time"), came out. The album came out in February. She wrote all ten songs on the album, including a duet with Gidi Gov, "Harikud Hamuzar Shel Halev" ("Strange Dance of the Heart"). In 2008 she and Yoni Rechter performed renditions of two poems by author David Grossman – "Sof" ("End"), for which Kenan wrote the music, and "Beveit Kafe" ("At a Coffee Shop"), which Rechter composed – at an afternoon honoring Grossman's latest novel at Holon's Mediatech Center. She also performed in London on a boat on the Thames, re-enactment of a Maapilim boat circa 1946, during the British Mandate of Palestine. In 2009 she released her third album, Shirim Leyoel ("Songs for Yoel"), a concept album inspired by her father's life story. In 2013, she was part of the Asaf Avidan European tour, as guitarist and vocalist and as support band in France. In January 2014 three singles from an album named "Af Al Pil" were released, Kenan participating in two of them. In "Ha'Parpar Ve'Ha'Zahal" she sings a duet with Omer Klein; in "Ani Ve'Atsmi" she's a solo vocalist. The album was composed by Shahar Barbash and translated to Hebrew from Yiddish by Benny Mer.

In 2005 she became a "chosen artist" of the Israel Cultural Excellence Foundation. She is openly gay and is considered an icon in the gay and lesbian community in Israel. In 2007 she was photographed for the Israeli fashion company Comme Il Faut.

== Discography ==
- Breathing Down to Zero (2004)
- Through Foreign Eyes (2007)
- Songs for Joel (2009)
- Takeoffs and Landings (2011)
- Collection (2016)
- Orange Time (2019)

Collaborations

- Ata khavera sheli (1997) (with Eran Zur)
- Ratsiti sheze lo yigamer (2000) (with Tal Gordon)
