= He Walked Through the Fields =

- DVD cover
- Directed by: Yosef Millo
- Screenplay by: Charles Heldman
- Based on: "He Walked Through the Fields" by Moshe Shamir
- Produced by: Yitzhak Agadati; Ya'akov Shteiner
- Starring: Assi Dayan; Iris Yotvat; Chana Eden; Eli Cohen; Hannah Aden; Shmuel Atzmon; Ya'ackov Ben-Sira
- Cinematography: James Allen
- Edited by: Nira Omri
- Music by: Sasha Argov
- Production companies: Meroz Films; Sadot Films
- Release date: 1967
- Running time: 90 minutes
- Country: Israel
- Language: Hebrew

He Walked Through the Fields (Hebrew: הוא הלך בשדות) is a 1967 Israeli drama directed by Yosef Millo. It was based on a popular novel and play of the same name by Moshe Shamir and filmed on Kibbutz Galil Yam.

In popular culture, Uri's character is perceived as embodying the mythical sabra. Nurith Gertz and other scholars argue that at the beginning of the film, Uri displays individualistic traits, but in its second half, he undergoes a "national redemption" and transforms into the quintessential Zionist sabra. Liat Steir-Livny contends that, in fact, the film deconstructs the cinematic portrayal of the mythical sabra. While Israeli culture embraced the external features of the cinematic character and the general plotlines, Uri's cinematic portrayal does not depict a successful blend of a farmer and a brave fighter. Instead, it reveals his breakdown—a confused man with childish traits, broken and lost, failing in every path he pursues.

== Plot ==
In 1946, Uri (Assi Dayan) returns to his kibbutz after 2 years of studying. He begins to feel alienated after discovering that his mother is having an affair with an outsider and his father has joined the British army. He meets Mika (Iris Yotvat), a young Holocaust survivor from Poland who is finding it difficult to adjust to kibbutz life, and soon falls in love with her. With Israel on the verge of statehood, and despite Mika's objections, Uri joins the Palmach, the pre-state Jewish underground militia, leading his men on missions and maneuvers without being aware of Mika's pregnancy. Uri volunteers for a dangerous military operation and is killed while blowing up a bridge controlled by the British. His parents receive the tragic news, but are comforted by the grandchild that is to be born to them.

== Critical reception ==
The film received generous financial support, and became one of the major events celebrating Israel's twentieth anniversary. The Prime Minister at the time, Levi Eshkol, as well as ministers and other public figures attended the premiere.

Although it garnered mixed reviews, the film had a good box office (selling some 320,000 tickets) and a significant cultural impact. This was Assi Dayan's debut role and it made him into an Israeli film icon.

The film has received attention in scholarship from writers like Nurith Gertz and Ella Shohat. Shohat, writing about the film's heroic protagonist, noting that in Hebrew language gibor (hero), gever (man), gvura (bravery), ligvor (to conquer, to overpower), and ligvor al (to win) all share the etymological root GBR, reflecting closely linked concepts of bravery, mastery and masculinity which were part of the Israeli "heroic-nationalist" films of this generation.
