= Shmuel Atzmon =

Israeli actor (born 1929)

- שמואל עצמון
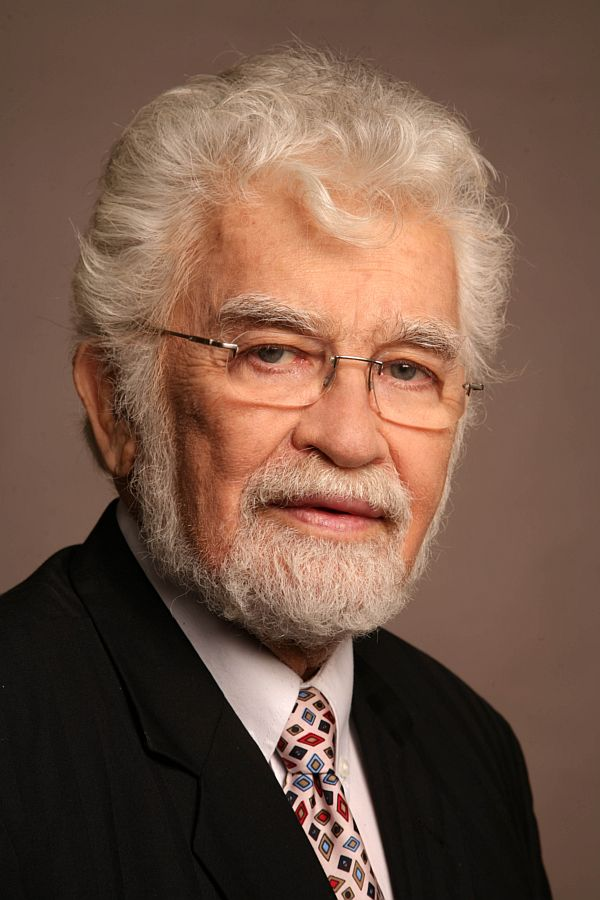
- Atzmon in 2009
- Born: Shmuel Wircer; 29 June 1929 (age 97); Biłgoraj, Second Polish Republic
- Other names: Shmuel Atzmon-Wircer; Shmulik Atzmon
- Occupations: Actor; theatre director; playwright
- Years active: 1949–present
- Children: 2, including Anat Atzmon

Shmuel Atzmon (Hebrew: שמואל עצמון; born 29 June 1929) is an Israeli actor, theatre director and playwright. Atzmon was born in Biłgoraj, Poland. After World War II broke out, his home was destroyed by German bombing during the Invasion of Poland and he subsequently escaped the Holocaust by fleeing to the Soviet Union. After the war, he wandered throughout Europe before immigrating to Israel in 1948. He fought in the Israel Defense Forces during the 1948 Arab-Israeli War, including in the Battles of Latrun. Following his discharge from the IDF in 1949, he started a career in theatre.

== Filmography ==
- He Walked Through the Fields
- The Story of Jacob and Joseph
- The Frog Prince
