= 1993 in Israel =

- Decades: 1970s; 1980s; 1990s; 2000s; 2010s
- See also: History of Israel; Timeline of Israeli history; List of years in Israel

Events in the year 1993 in Israel.

== Incumbents ==
- President of Israel – Chaim Herzog until 13 May, Ezer Weizman
- Prime Minister of Israel – Yitzhak Rabin (Israeli Labor Party)
- President of the Supreme Court – Meir Shamgar
- Chief of General Staff – Ehud Barak
- Government of Israel – 25th Government of Israel

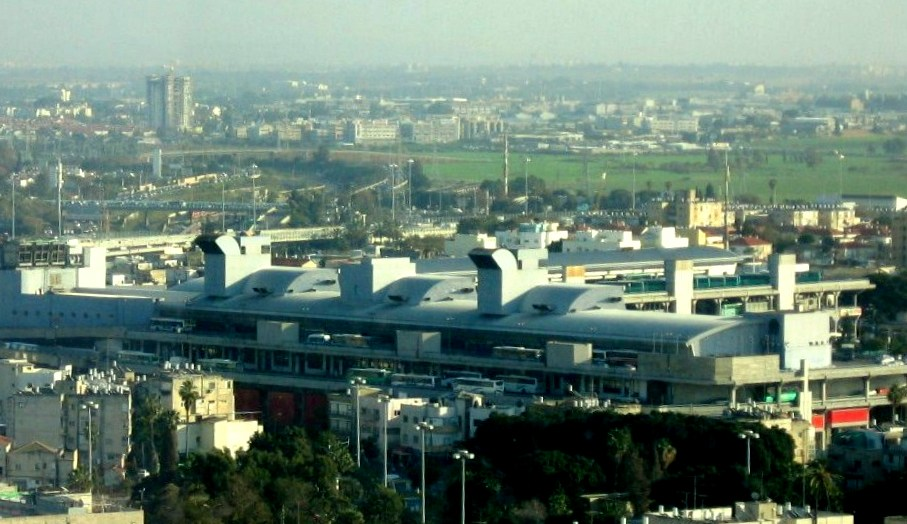
The new Tel Aviv Central Bus Station opens to the public on 18 August 1993.

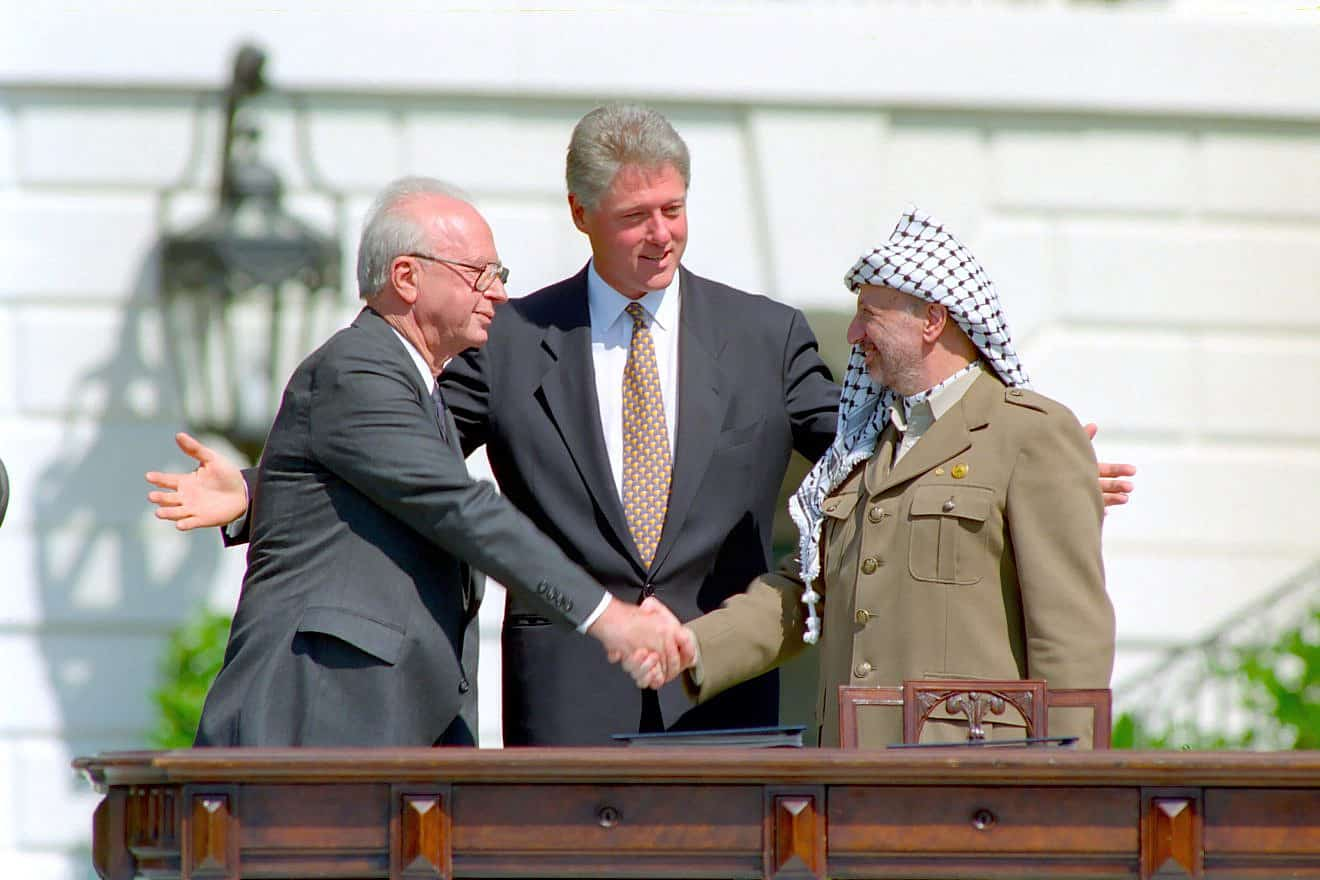
Yitzhak Rabin, Bill Clinton, and Yasser Arafat at the Oslo Accords signing ceremony on 13 September 1993.

== Events ==
=== March ===
- 24 March – The Knesset elects Ezer Weizman as President of Israel, by a majority of 66 to 53, against Dov Shilansky.

=== April ===
- 16 April – Mehola Junction bombing: A Hamas militant carries out the first suicide bombing by Palestinian Arab militants from the Palestinian territories against Israeli targets. A Palestinian Arab bystander and the bomber are killed in the attack and seven IDF soldiers and a Palestinian Arab are injured.

=== May ===
- 13 May – Ezer Weizman assumes office as the seventh president of the State of Israel.
- 15 May – Lehakat Shiru represents Israel at the Eurovision Song Contest with the song “Shiru” ("Sing").

=== July ===
- July – The 1993 Maccabiah Games are held.
- 25 July – Operation Accountability: IDF forces launch a week-long attack in Lebanon with specified three purposes: to strike directly at Hezbollah; to make it difficult for Hezbollah to use southern Lebanon as a base for striking Israel; and to displace refugees in the hopes of pressuring the Lebanese government to intervene against Hezbollah.
- 29 July – The Supreme Court of Israel acquits accused Nazi death camp guard John Demjanjuk of all charges and he is set free.

=== August ===
- 18 August – The new Tel Aviv Central Bus Station opens to the public, after more than 25 years of construction.
- 20 August – The first agreement in the Oslo Accords is signed, between by Foreign Minister Shimon Peres for Israel, Mahmoud Abbas for the PLO and Secretary of State Warren Christopher for the United States.

=== September ===
- 13 September – The Oslo Accords are officially signed at a public ceremony in Washington, DC in the presence of Israeli Prime Minister Yitzhak Rabin, PLO chairman Yasser Arafat and US President Bill Clinton
- 19 September – Michael Jackson performed in the Yarkon Park in a concert attended by 70,000 fans.

=== November ===
- 4 November – The Israeli commercial television channel Channel 2 begins its broadcasting.

=== December ===
- 30 December – Israel and the Vatican establish diplomatic relations.

== Births ==
- 22 January – Netta Barzilai, Israeli singer, winner of the Eurovision Song Contest 2018.
- 17 June – Kevin Rubin, YouTuber and actor
- 18 June – Dennis Lloyd, Israeli record producer and musician
- 28 August – Shira Naor, actress
- 6 September – Rudy Rochman, Jewish-Israeli rights activist
- 22 October – Omer Adam, Israeli singer
- 23 December – Shlomit Malka, Israeli model.

== Deaths ==
- 16 February – Amos Guttman (born 1954), Romanian-born Israeli film director.
- 30 April – Frija Zoaretz (born 1907), Libyan-born Israeli politician.
- 10 July - Ya'akov Frank (born 1913), Israeli politician.
- 11 October – Nathan Rotenstreich (born 1914), Austro-Hungarian (Galicia)-born Israeli professor of philosophy.
- 30 October – Benjamin Shapira (born 1913), German–born Israeli biochemist.
- 18 November - Joseph Gillis (born 1911), British-born Israeli mathematician.
- 18 December – Emanuel Amiran-Pougatchov (born 1909), Russian-born Israeli composer.

== See also ==
- 1993 in Israeli film
- 1993 in Israeli television
- 1993 in Israeli music
- 1993 in Israeli sport
- Israel in the Eurovision Song Contest 1993
