= Fifty-Fifty (1971 film) =

Fifty Fifty
- Directed by: Boaz Davidson
- Written by: Assi Dayan; Boaz Davidson; Nissim Azikri
- Produced by: Assi Dayan; Moshe Golan
- Starring: Nissim Azikri; Ze'ev Berlinski; Aliza Itzhaki; Assi Dayan
- Cinematography: David Gurfinkel
- Edited by: Jacques Erlich
- Music by: David Kriboshe
- Release date: 1971
- Running time: 83 minutes
- Country: Israel
- Language: Hebrew
- Budget: IL500,000

"Fifty-fifty" (Hebrew: חצי חצי) is an Israeli comedy film directed by Boaz Davidson and produced by Assi Dayan and Moshe Golan. The film was released in 1971, belongs to the Bourekas film genre, and sold 173,000 tickets in Israel.

The plot takes place in Tel Aviv during the early 1970s. Grossman is a bakery owner who wins the lottery, but he holds only half of the winning ticket. The other half is in the possession of his partner Levi, who dies unexpectedly. The plot gets complicated when two crooks break into and settle in Levi's apartment.

== Plot ==
"Fifty-fifty" begins with the death of Leo Levi, the owner of a bakery in partnership with Grossman (Zeev Berlinski), his close friend. Before his death, Leo used to buy a lottery ticket from Mifal HaPais with Grossman every week, splitting it—half for himself and half for Grossman. After the funeral, Grossman opens the newspaper and discovers that the ticket he bought that week with Leo had won the lottery prize of 100,000 liras.

At first, he plans to inform Leo's daughter, but his wife convinces him not to say anything, to sneak into Leo's empty apartment, and steal the other half of the ticket. However, in the meantime, Leo's daughter has already rented out the apartment to two amateur gangsters who found the other half of the ticket.

Meanwhile, the competing automated bakery threatens to finally shut down Grossman's manual bakery.

The two gangsters (David Baruch and Assi Dayan), who have one half of the ticket, go searching for Grossman, who holds the other half, to claim the prize. They arrive at his house and encounter his nephew Ezra (Yossi Pollak), arranging with him to go to the Mifal HaPais office in the morning to collect the prize.

After threats from the automated bakery workers ("The Dreks"), Grossman decides to teach them a lesson. Together with Levi's son-in-law (Nissim Azikri), he breaks into the bakery and beats up the owner's two baker sons (Tzvi Shissel and Dori Ben-Ze’ev). That same evening, Levi's son-in-law sneaks into the gangsters' house and manages to steal their half of the ticket.

The next morning, Levi's son-in-law arrives at Grossman's bakery with half the ticket and shows it to Grossman, who cannot find his own half because his nephew stole it the night before to go with the two gangsters to Mifal HaPais. When the gangsters also arrive at the bakery and fail to locate the ticket, a brawl erupts. The "Dreks" from the automated bakery join the fray, seeking revenge for the "treatment" Grossman gave them the previous night. Amidst the chaos, one of the gangsters grabs both halves of the ticket and hides them in the fresh dough just before it goes into the oven. While being pelted with flour and dough, he manages to pull a loaf of bread from the oven and escapes.

When the others realize what has happened, they chase him through the city streets. Eventually, the gangster reaches the Mifal HaPais office, but when he slices the loaf of bread, he discovers that half of the ticket is missing. At that moment, the others arrive, and another fight breaks out over the ticket.

Suddenly, Ezra, Grossman's nephew, appears with another loaf of bread containing the missing ticket. Declaring, "Bread is not a radish," he gives the ticket to Grossman, Levi's son-in-law, and Levi's daughter, who win the grand prize.

The film's soundtrack includes several songs performed by Arik Einstein ("Leo the Good" and "Not by the Half Alone") and Assi Dayan ("Don't Say a Word").

== Cast ==
- Ze'ev Berlinski as Grossman (The baker)
- Yossi Pollak as Ezra, Grossman's nephew
- Aliza Itzhaki as Leo Levi's daughter
- Nissim Azikri as Leo Levi's son-in-low
- Assi Dayan as the first thief
- Baruch David as the second thief
- Nahum Buchman as the manager of the automated bakery
- Dori Ben-Ze'ev as the son of the manager
- Tzvi Shissel as the other son of the manager

== Soundtrack ==
A five-song extended play was issued for the film containing the three songs that were sung in the films, two by Arik Einstein and one by Assi Dayan, and two accompanying tracks. The EP wasn't reissued since in any format, although the two Arik Einstein songs were reprinted in some compilation albums and on the 2018 Arik Einstein rare recordings collection "VeOd Lo Amarti HaKol" (And I Yet to Say It All; Hebrew: ועוד לא אמרתי הכל).

=== Track listing ===
Side A

1. "Leo HaTov" (Good Leo; Hebrew: ליאו הטוב) – Arik Einstein (4:51)
2. "Al Tagid Mila" (Don't Say a Word; Hebrew: אל תגיד מילה) – Assi Dayan (3:40)

Side B

1. "Lo Al HaHetzi Levado" (Not By the Half Only) – Arik Einstein (3:01)
2. "Same'ach BaMa'afiya" (Merry in the Bakery; Hebrew: שמח במאפיה) – David Kriboshe (2:47)
3. "Ne'imat Hetzi Hetzi" (Fifty Fifty Theme; Hebrew: נעימת חצי חצי) – Gali Atari (2:00)

== See also ==
- Cinema of Israel
