= 1991 in Israel =

- Decades: 1970s; 1980s; 1990s; 2000s; 2010s
- See also: History of Israel; Timeline of Israeli history; List of years in Israel

Events in the year 1991 in Israel.

== Incumbents ==
- President of Israel – Chaim Herzog
- Prime Minister of Israel – Yitzhak Shamir (Likud)
- President of the Supreme Court – Meir Shamgar
- Chief of General Staff – Dan Shomron until 1 April, Ehud Barak
- Government of Israel – 24th Government of Israel

== Events ==
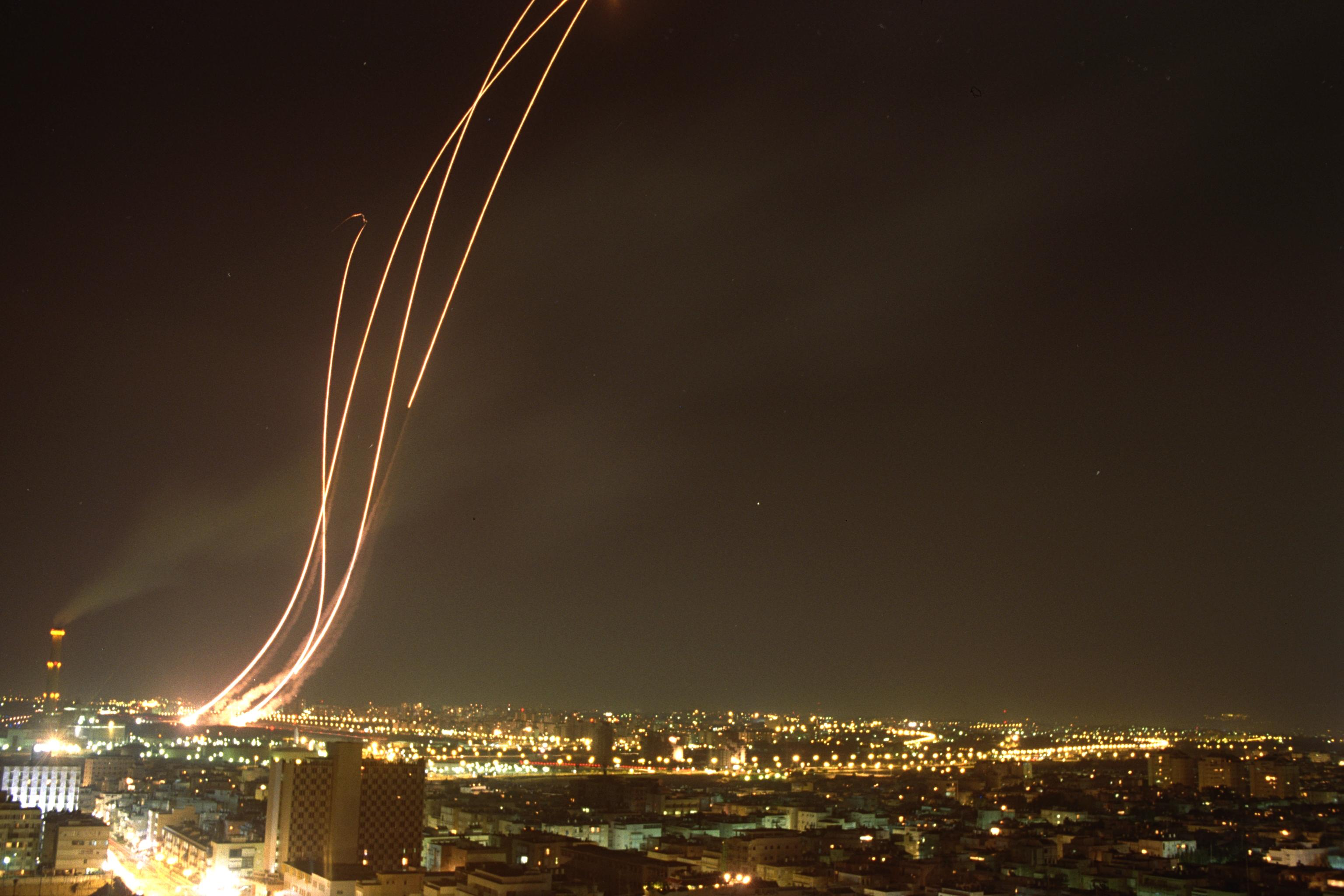
Patriot missiles launch to intercept an Iraqi Scud over Tel Aviv

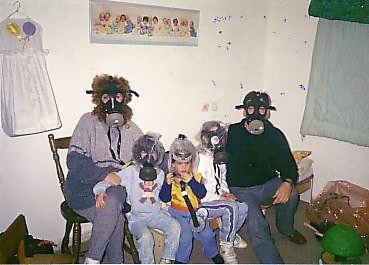
Israeli family in Shelter

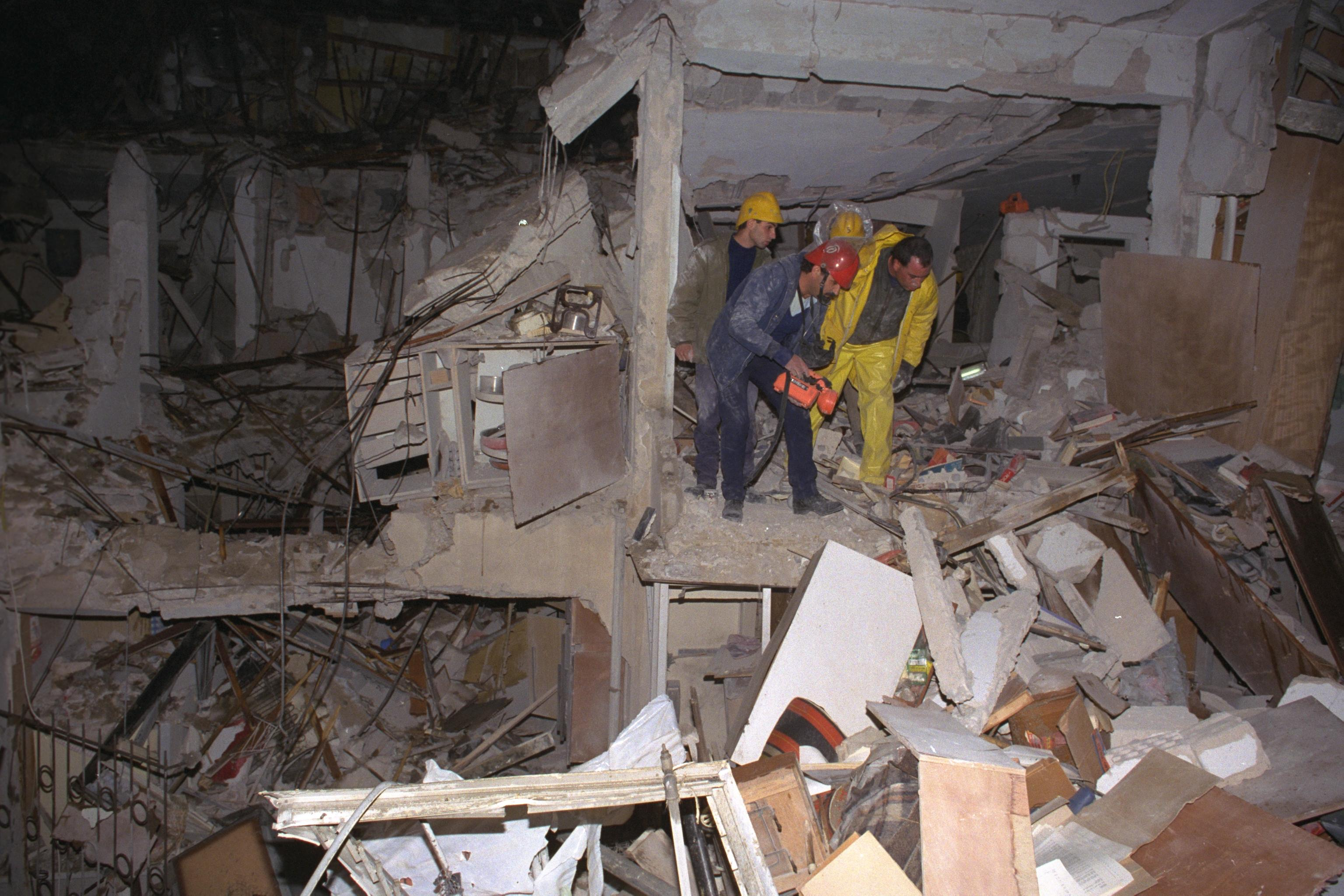
Scud damage in Ramat Gan

- 1 January – Gulf War curfew in Palestine: Israel imposes a 24-hour curfew on the occupied Palestinian territories to prevent demonstrations marking the anniversary of Fatah’s founding; four Palestinians are killed after breaking the curfew.
- 17 January – Gulf War: Iraq fires eight Scud missiles into Israel in an unsuccessful bid to provoke Israeli retaliation.
- 22 January – Gulf War: Three Scuds and one Patriot strike Ramat Gan in Israel, wounding 96 people, as three elderly people die of heart attacks.
- 6 February – Israeli warplanes carry out airstrikes against Palestinian guerrilla positions linked to the PLO’s Fatah faction in southern Lebanon near Sidon, in response to several days of Katyusha rocket attacks on Israel’s security zone.
- 25 February – The final Scud missile barrage against Israel occurs, ending the direct missile threat from Iraq shortly before the Gulf War ceasefire.
- 1 April – Ehud Barak is appointed as the 14th Chief of Staff of the Israel Defense Forces.
- 4 May – Duo Datz represents Israel at the Eurovision Song Contest with the song “Kan” ("Here"), achieving third place.
- 24–25 May – Operation Solomon is carried out, a large-scale airlift that evacuated approximately 14,000 Ethiopian Jews to Israel within roughly 36 hours, as rebel forces close in on Addis Ababa.
- 30 October - 1 November – The Madrid Conference is held in the Spanish capital Madrid, aimed at promoting the peace process between Israel, the Palestinian Arabs and Arab countries. The conference is hosted by the government of Spain and co-sponsored by the United States and the USSR.
- 16 December – United Nations General Assembly Resolution 4686 revokes UN General Assembly Resolution 3379, which had equated Zionism with a form of racism. Israel had made revocation of resolution 3379 a condition for Israel's participation in the Madrid Peace Conference of 1991.

== Notable deaths ==
- 1 February – Herzl Rosenblum (born 1903), Russian (Lithuania)-born Israeli journalist and politician, signer of the Israeli Declaration of Independence.
- 7 February – Amos Yarkoni (born 1920), Israeli Bedouin IDF soldier.
- 3 July – Ephraim Urbach (born 1912), Russian (Poland)-born Israeli Talmudic scholar.
- 10 August – Hans Jakob Polotsky (born 1905) Swiss-born Israeli orientalist, linguist and university professor.
- 14 September – Moshe Goshen-Gottstein (born 1925), German-born Israeli Linguist and Bible scholar.
- 2 November – Yosef Almogi (born 1925), Polish-born Israeli politician.
- 27 December – Eitan Livni (born 1919), Polish-born Revisionist Zionist activist, Irgun commander and Israeli politician.

== See also ==
- 1991 in Israeli film
- 1991 in Israeli television
- 1991 in Israeli music
- 1991 in Israeli sport
- Israel in the Eurovision Song Contest 1991
