= Cupcakes (film) =

- Film poster
- Hebrew: בננות
- Directed by: Eytan Fox
- Written by: Eytan Fox; Eli Bijaoui
- Starring: Anat Waxman; Keren Berger; Ofer Shechter; Efrat Dor; Yael Bar Zohar; Dana Ivgy; Edouard Baer
- Release date: 14 February 2013
- Running time: 89 minutes
- Country: Israel
- Language: Hebrew

Cupcakes (Hebrew: בננות, romanized: Bananot, lit. 'Bananas') is a 2013 Israeli Hebrew-language musical comedy film.

== Plot ==
In Tel Aviv, a group of friends meet to watch the Universong song contest. The friends are unimpressed by the Israeli entry and start singing their own song. A mobile phone recording of the singing goes viral and the group are selected as the Israeli entry for the next Universong.

== Cast ==
The Band
Character	Actor
Yael	Yael Bar Zohar
Dana	Dana Ivgy
Anat	Anat Waxman
Keren	Keren Berger
Efrat	Efrat Dor
Ofer	Ofer Shechter

== Themes ==
The song contest in Cupcakes is modelled on the Eurovision Song Contest. Fox said that he wanted to make a "feel good movie" with Cupcakes.

== Critical reception ==
Andy Webster in The New York Times praised the film's casting and production design. Sheri Linden for the Los Angeles Times praised the "bright zingers and seamless fantasy sequences" of the film, but said that clunky moments held the film back.

The Guardian's Dee Rudebeck awarded the film three out of five stars. Rudebeck was critical of the lack of complex character development, but added that this shouldn't be an issue for fans of the genre. The London Evening Standard also awarded the film three out of five stars.

Variety praised the film as "Endearingly goofy". The Hollywood Reporter bemoaned that the film "lacks the anarchical humor necessary to overcome its predictable elements".

The Jerusalem Post described the film as an "infectious and enjoyable movie".
