= HaDerekh LeEin Harod =

- Release date: 1990
- Country: Israel

HaDerekh LeEin Harod (Hebrew: הדרך לעין חרוד, lit. The Road to Ein Harod) is a 1990 Israeli film, adapted from Amos Kenan's dystopian novel, describing a future civil war in Israel. The title refers to the journey of the protagonist to Kibbutz Ein Harod.

The film was directed by Doron Eran and starred Tony Peck (Gregory Peck's son, in his first starring role), Alessandra Mussolini, and Arnon Zadok. It was filmed in Israel but shot in English and aimed at an international market; funding primarily came from European and American investors.

Despite its large budget by Israeli standards (US$800,000), the film "suffered a bitter critical and commercial failure." It was panned by The Jerusalem Post upon its release: "This should be politically meaningful...But it is impossible to take anything in this picture seriously, when everything is so blatantly fake and clumsy."
