= Eytan Fox =

Israeli film director

- איתן פוקס
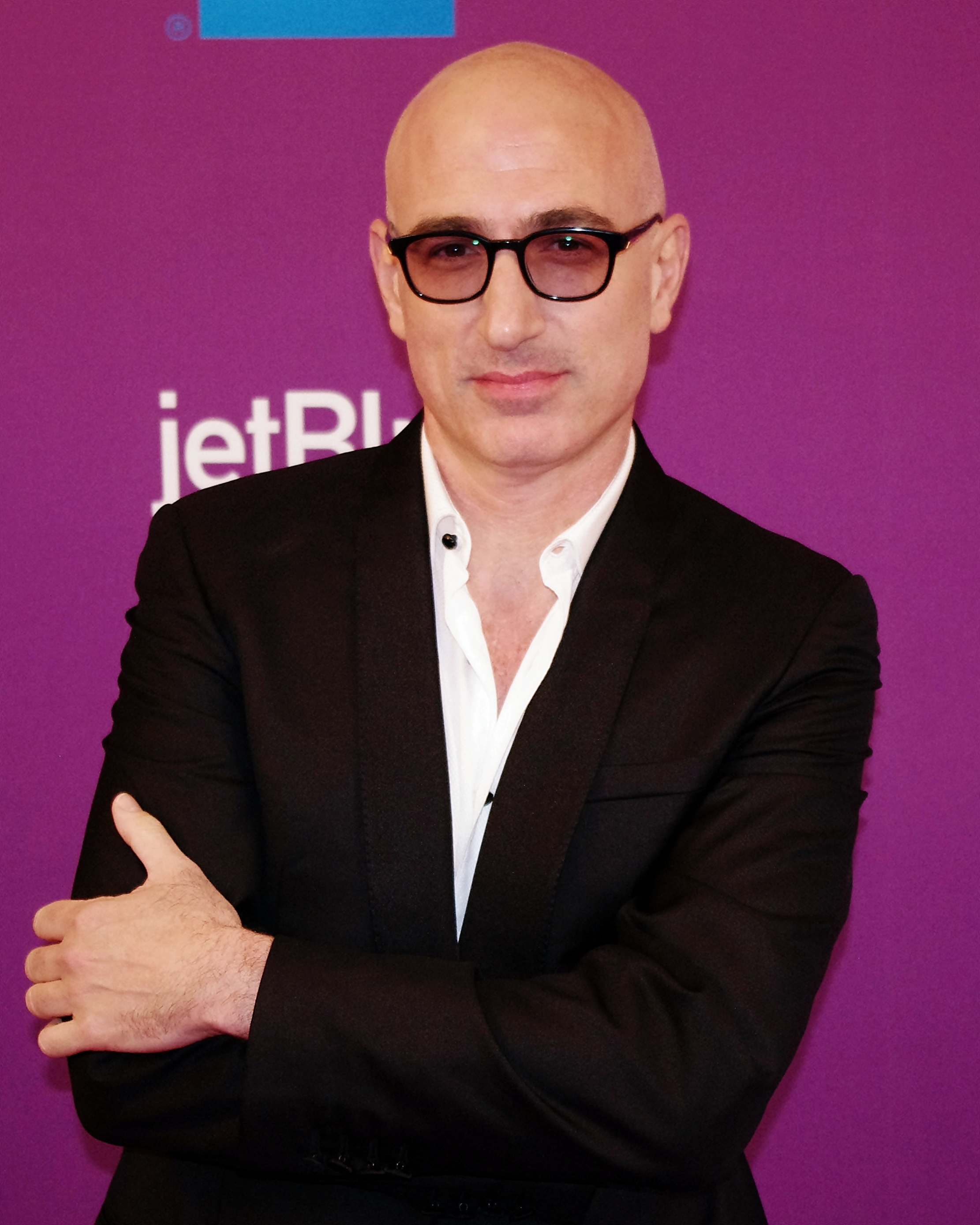
- Fox at the 2012 Tribeca Film Festival world premiere of Yossi's Story
- Born: August 21, 1964 (age 62); New York City, New York, U.S.
- Occupations: Film director, producer, screenwriter
- Partner: Gal Uchovsky

Eytan Fox (Hebrew: איתן פוקס; born on August 21, 1964) is an Israeli film director.

== Biography ==
Eytan Fox was born in New York City. His family immigrated to Israel when he was two. His father, Seymour Fox, was a Conservative rabbi and a professor of Jewish education at the Hebrew University of Jerusalem. His mother, Sara Kaminker-Fox, was the head of the Jerusalem city council and involved in Jerusalem urban planning. Fox has two brothers, David and Danny. General Yehuda Fox is his cousin. He grew up in Jerusalem, served in the army, and studied at Tel Aviv University's School of Film and Television. He is openly gay and many of his films contain themes of homosexuality, as well as the effect the Israeli–Palestinian conflict has on interpersonal relationships.

Fox and his partner, Gal Uchovsky, have a long-term relationship. They are also professional collaborators, Uchovsky, a screenwriter, producer and journalist, is involved in much of the scriptwriting for Fox's movies.

His 2002 film Yossi & Jagger is a portrayal of the love between two young Jewish military men while completing their mandatory national service. In the 2004 film Walk on Water, he takes on the thorny topics of racism/discrimination and confronting the Nazi past of two young upper class Germans. Lior Ashkenazi plays a Mossad assassin under cover as a tour guide. In the 2006 film The Bubble, he asks the big question: What is love? as the film follows three young Tel Aviv residents, a female political activist and her two gay roommates, one of whom (the same actor from Yossi & Jagger) falls in love with a Palestinian (who also appears as a waiter) while on border guard duty as part of his national military service.

== Awards ==
In 2006, Fox was the first recipient of the Washington Jewish Film Festival's Decade Award, a prize given to a filmmaker whose work has made a significant contribution to Jewish cinema over a period of at least ten years.

== Filmography ==
=== Films ===
- After (1990)
- Shirat Ha'Sirena (Siren's Song, 1994)
- Yossi & Jagger (2002)
- Walk on Water (2004)
- The Bubble (2006)
- Yossi (2012), a sequel to Yossi & Jagger
- Cupcakes (Bananot) (2013)
- Sublet (2020)

=== Television ===
- Sipurim Kzarim Al Ahava, episode "Ba'al Ba'al Lev" (1997)
- Florentine (1997 - 2000)
- Tamid Oto Chalom (2009) released in UK and US in 2011 as Mary Lou, and starring Ido Rosenberg, Alon Levi, and Dana Frider
- The Bar Mitzvah (2018)
