= Matan Balestra =

Israeli footballer

Matan Balestra מתן בלסטרה
Personal information
- Full name: Matan Balestra
- Date of birth: June 4, 1992 (age 34)
- Place of birth: Tiberias, Israel
- Position: Attacking midfielder

Youth career
- Ironi Tiberias
- 2007–2011: Maccabi Netanya

Senior career*
Years	Team	Apps	(Gls)
2011–2014	Maccabi Netanya	11	(0)
2012–2014	→ Sektzia Ness Ziona (loan)	48	(2)

International career
2008	Israel U-16	1	(0)
2008–2009	Israel U-17	2	(0)
2009	Israel U-18	5	(0)
- * Club domestic league appearances and goals as of 3 August 2014

Matan Balestra (Hebrew: מתן בלסטרה; born June 4, 1992) is a former Israeli footballer that played for Maccabi Netanya and Sektzia Ness Ziona.
