= Nurith Gertz =

Israeli academic (born 1940)

- נורית גרץ
- Born: 1940 (age 85–86); Jerusalem
- Occupations: Professor and author

Academic background
- Education: Hebrew University (BA); Tel Aviv University (MA), (PhD)
- Thesis: Generation Shift in Literary History: The Generation of the Sixties in Hebrew-Narrative Prose (1979)

Nurith Gertz (Hebrew: נורית גרץ; born 1940) is an Israeli Professor Emerita of Hebrew literature and film at The Open University of Israel. She served as head of the theoretical track at the Department of Film and Television, at Tel Aviv University, and heads the Department of Culture and Production at Sapir College.

== Biography ==
Nurith Gertz was born in Jerusalem and attended Hebrew Gymnasium and the Kanot Agricultural School. In 1969 she received a B.A. in Literature and Political Science from the Hebrew University, Jerusalem, and in 1973 an M.A. in Poetics and Comparative Literature from Tel Aviv University. She received a doctorate from Tel Aviv University in 1979; her dissertation engaged with the topic ‘Generation Shift in Literary History: The Generation of the Sixties in Hebrew-Narrative Prose’, supervised by Prof. Benjamin Hrushovski (Harshav).

Gertz married Israeli author Amos Kenan, with whom she has two daughters, journalist Shlomzion Kenan and poet and songwriter Rona Kenan.

== Academic career ==
Gertz joined the faculty of The Open University of Israel in the early 1980s. In the 1990s, she shifted her research focus to film, and was appointed Full Professor in 2001. At that period, she also taught at Tel Aviv University’s Department of Film, and from 2003 to 2009 was the university’s Head of Theoretical Film Studies. Since 2008, she has served as head of the Culture and Production department at Sapir College’s B.A. programme. She was a Visiting Assistant Professor at U.C. Berkeley in 1984, and in 1989-1990 as well as 2001, was a Visiting Assistant Professor at Yale University, in Judaic Studies, Cinema Studies and Comparative Literature. In 1996 and 2004 she was visiting professor at the Center for Advanced Judaic Studies, University of Pennsylvania and in 2006, she gave a course on the history of Palestinian cinema at the Cinema Department of the Paris 8 University, Paris.

== Literary career ==
Space and Memory in Palestinian Cinema, written together with George Khleifi, was published in Hebrew in 2006 and in English in 2008. The book explores the history of Palestinian film, with emphasis on the four founding filmmakers – Michel Khleifi, Rashid Masharawi, Ali Nassar, and Elia Suleiman. It looks at the connections between cinematic creation, trauma and repressed memory through social and political developments. A major theme in the book is the issue of continuity that Palestinian film tries to disclose – between the ostensibly lost time and the tribulations of the present. Gertz and Khleifi maintain that Palestinian cinema attempts to create continuity of the Palestinian historical memory while striving to work through the traumatic event of 1948.

Not From Here (El Ma Shenamog, co-authored with Dvorah Gertz) was published in 1997. This documentary-fictional work, explores the biography of Dvorah Gertz, Nurith Gert'z mother, from Warsaw to Italy, then immigration to a kibbutz in Israel where she met Aharon Gertz. The broad historical canvas that weaves together events and dreams, is built on and streamlined in her second documentary-fictional work Unrepentant (Al Da’at atzmo: Arba'a pirkei haim shel Amos Kenan).

Unrepentant (Al Da’at atzmo: Arba’ah pirkei haim shel Amos Kenan) was published in Hebrew in 2008 and is Gertz’s second documentary-fictional work. As in her previous book in this genre, she integrates realistic documentation of historical events with an affectionate work of fiction that enters its protagonist’s consciousness, memories and dreams. The book describes four periods in the life of Amos Kenan, author, sculptor, and poet, who was Nurith Gertz’s life partner. It opens with Kenan’s childhood, with the mental decline of his father Yakov Levine, a member of the Labour Battalion (Gdud HaAvodah) who lived according to the Zionist dream and the dream of the Socialist revolution – but ended as a victim of both. The following chapter tracks Kenan’s joining the Lehi underground (Stern Group) before and during 1948 war. It describes moments in which dreams and longings handed down from father to son clash with the reality of war. The next chapter follows Kenan's life during the first decade of the state of Israel, and his disillusionment that finally leads to his arrest for attempting to assassinate Israeli Transportation Minister David-Zvi Pinkas. The final chapter depicts Kenan’s life in Paris and follows his love affair with the author Christiane Rochefort.

== Awards and recognition ==
Gertz was awarded grants in 2003 and 2008 from the Israeli Science Foundation; in 2006 from The Minerva Center for Human Rights; and in 2005-2006 from the Israeli Palestinian Science Organization for a joint research with producer and director George Khleifi. She won the Brenner Prize for Literature in 2009 for her book Unrepentant (Al Da’at atzmo: Arba’ah pirkei haim shel Amos Kenan), and in 2010 received the Israeli Book Publishers’ Association Gold Award (2010). That year she was also nominated for the Sapir Prize for Literature. The book joined the list of the Ten Books of the Decade, a list drawn up by the Yediot Aharonot newspaper, and was named one of the five books of the decade by "Galei Tzahal" Radio.

== Published works ==
- Amos Oz: Monograph, Sifriat Poalim, 1980, (Hebrew).
- Hirbet Hiza’a and The Morning After, Hakibbutz Hameuchad & The Porter Institute for Poetics and Semiotics, Tel-Aviv University, 1983, (Hebrew).
- Myths in Israeli Culture, London: Vallentine Mitchell, Parker–Wiener Series, Parkes Center, University of Southampton & Wiener Library, 2000.
- Not From Here (El Ma Shenamog) (with Dvorah Gertz), Berkeley and Los Angeles: University of California Press, 1997
- Holocaust Survivors, Aliens and Others in Israeli Cinema and Literature, Am Oved, The Open University, 2004, (Hebrew).
- Space and Memory in Palestinian Cinema (with George Khleifi), Edinburgh: Edinburgh University Press and Indiana University Press.
- Unrepentant (Al Da’at atzmo: Arbaim pirkei haim shel Amos Kenan), Am Oved, 2008.
- An Ocean Between Us, 2015
- What was Lost in Time: Biography of a Friendship, 2020

== See also ==
- Women of Israel
