= After (Israeli film) =

- אפטר
- Directed by: Eytan Fox
- Written by: Nathan Brand & Eytan Fox
- Screenplay by: Eytan Fox
- Produced by: Ronit Ben Menachem
- Starring: Gil Frank; Hanoch Re’im; Tzofit Grant (Elishiv); Binyamin Yagendorf; Uri Mauda; Moshe Ferster; Muhammad Kharzallah; Yuval Carmi; Dana Cohen
- Cinematography: Avi Karpik
- Edited by: Yosef Greenfeld
- Music by: Yehuda Poliker
- Release date: 1990
- Running time: 44 minutes
- Country: Israel
- Language: Hebrew

After is a 1990 Israeli short film directed by Eytan Fox, produced by Ronit Ben‑Menahem.

== Synopsis ==
The film follows a young Israeli soldier in a combat unit preparing to be deployed to Lebanon. After receiving a day off in Jerusalem, he discovers that his commanding lieutenant is engaging in a sexual liaison in a public park. The dynamic between the soldier and his superior becomes increasingly tense.

== Cast ==
Actor	Role	Notes
Gil Frank	Erez	The platoon commander
Hanoch Re’im	Yonatan	
Tzofit Grant (Elishiv)	Mali	Department clerk
Binyamin Yagendorf	Ido	Yonatan's close friend in the platoon
Uri Mauda	Gzuli	Soldier in the platoon
Moshe Ferster	Morgenstern	Soldier in the platoon
Muhammad Kharzallah	Rahamim	Soldier in the platoon
Yuval Carmi	—	The sergeant
Dana Cohen	Shira	Ido's girlfriend

== Production ==
After is a 45-minute Israeli film. The film explores themes of military life, power dynamics, sexuality, and the moral complexities of service in the Israeli army.

== Reception and significance ==
Although not widely known internationally, the film is an early work of Eytan Fox, who would later go on to direct more widely recognized Israeli films. The short format and setting in the Israeli military context allow the film to explore issues of authority, vulnerability, and masculinity within the IDF framework. Because detailed reception information is scarce, its impact is more significant in relation to Fox's development as a filmmaker rather than in mainstream box office or award terms. This film is one of the first films in the Israeli film industry on the theme of homosexuality.

== Legacy ==
While After remains a niche work, especially given its short runtime and early date in Fox's career, it stands as an example of Israeli cinema's willingness to engage with internal critique of military culture. Eytan Fox would later gain broader prominence with films such as Yossi & Jagger (2002) and Walk on Water (2004).
