= Karl Frankenstein =

Israeli academic (1905 – 1990)

Karl Frankenstein קרל פרנקנשטיין
- Karl Frankenstein (right)
- Born: 16 February 1905; Berlin, Germany
- Died: 22 January 1990 (aged 84); Jerusalem, Israel
- Citizenship: Israeli
- Writing career
- Language: Hebrew
- Notable awards: Israel Prize (1965)

Karl Frankenstein (Hebrew: קרל פרנקנשטיין; 16 February 1905 – 22 January 1990) was an Israeli professor in special education and pedagogy.

== Biography ==
Frankenstein was born in 1905 in Berlin, Germany. In 1927, he completed his studies in philosophy and psychology at Berlin University and the University of Erlangen. During his studies, he was actively involved in Jewish relief organizations. After a period in France, he immigrated to Mandate Palestine in 1935.

== Pedagogic and academic career ==
From 1935 until 1965, Frankenstein was a lecturer and faculty member at a number of educational establishments, including the School of Social Service of the Jewish National Council, nursing schools, teaching seminars, Youth Aliyah organizations and the Department of Criminology at the Hebrew University of Jerusalem. In 1937, he was appointed as the first juvenile probation officer in the country. He was also served as liaison between the National Committee and the Mandate authorities in the field of for welfare and education and was also active behalf of the National Council with respect to the social and educational welfare of children from Mizrahi families.

In 1948, after the establishment of the State of Israel, he was appointed head of the Henrietta Szold Institute, (National Institute for Research in the Behavioral Sciences) in Jerusalem. He held this position until 1953.

From 1951 until his retirement in 1969, Frankenstein was a faculty member at the Hebrew University, and served as a professor for pedagogy and special education. His principal areas of study were developmental sociology, juvenile delinquency, rehabilitation intelligence, problems in immigrant absorption, ways of thinking, psychology and psychopathy.

After retiring from the university, he served as editor of the journal "Magamot" (Trends).

== Awards and recognition ==
- In 1965, Frankenstein was awarded the Israel Prize, in education.

== Published works ==
Frankenstein's thoughts and research were published in many books, primarily in Hebrew, but including eight in English and four German.

- Wolfradt, Uwe; Billmann-Mahecha, Elfriede; Stock, Armin, eds. (2014). Deutschsprachige Psychologinnen und Psychologen 1933–1945: Ein Personenlexikon, ergänzt um einen Text von Erich Stern. Springer-Verlag. ISBN 978-3-658-01481-0.

== See also ==
- List of Israel Prize recipients
