= David Fox (lawyer) =

American lawyer

David Fox is an American lawyer with a specialty in public companies mergers and acquisitions. He was with Skadden, Arps, Slate, Meagher & Flom for over 20 years, where he was a partner and a member of the executive team before moving to Kirkland & Ellis in 2009.

== Early life ==
Fox was born in New York City in 1958. His father was Seymour Fox, a rabbi and Jewish educator, and mother was Sarah Kaminker, a city planner. His family immigrated to Jerusalem when he was nine years old.

== Career ==
At 25, Fox returned to New York, where he began his career with Skadden. Some notable transactions led by Fox at Skadden include the $6.6 billion leveraged buyout of Toys "R" Us and the sale of Aztar Corporation to Columbia Sussex for $2.75 billion.

In 2009, Fox left Skadden for Kirkland & Ellis, where he developed their M&A practice. At the time of his departure, Fox was one of the highest-paid lawyers at Skadden and it marked the first time a partner had left the firm for a competitor. At Kirkland, he oversaw the New York office, was a member of the executive committee and developed the M&A practice, which rose from 90th to first in global M&A rankings and helped the firm become the highest-grossing law firm in the world.

Fox has also been active in the M&A ecosystem of Israel. Some of the Israeli deals he handled include the sale of Koor Industries’s stake in Makhteshim Agan to ChemChina for $2.4 billion and Teva Pharmaceuticals' acquisition of Cephalon for $6.8 billion.

In addition to practicing law, Fox serves on a number of boards and has taught at his alma mater, Hebrew University of Jerusalem.

In 2018, The Deal honored Fox with its first ever M&A Lifetime Achievement award. In 2020, he stepped down from the executive committee at Kirkland.

== Personal life ==
Fox has two brothers, filmmaker Eytan Fox and MIT Linguistics professor Danny Fox.
