= Assi Dayan =

Israeli film director, actor, screenwriter and producer (1945–2014)

Assi Dayan אסי דיין
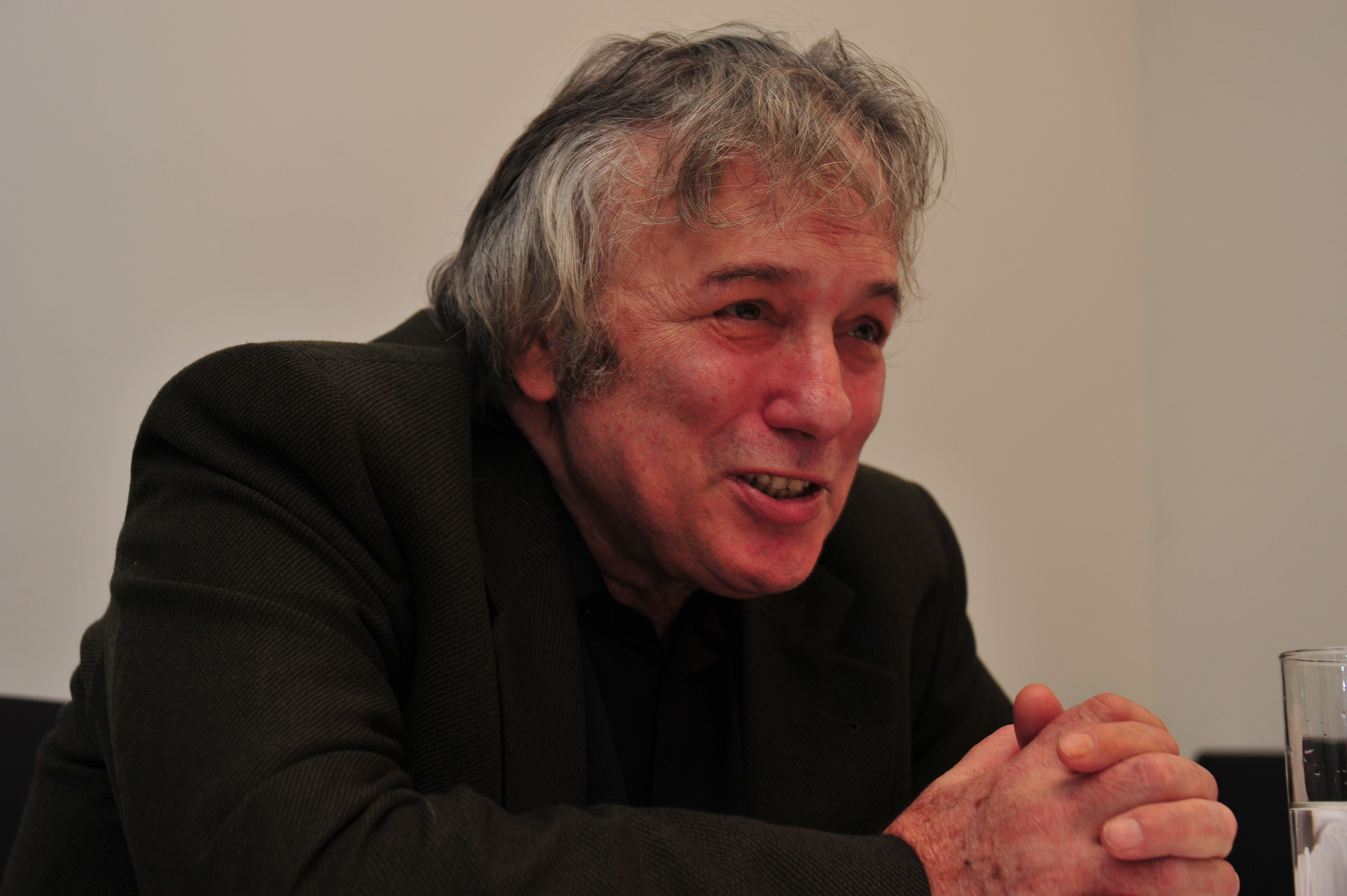
- Born: 23 November 1945; Nahalal, Mandatory Palestine
- Died: 1 May 2014 (aged 68); Tel Aviv, Israel
- Resting place: Moshav Nahalal Cemetery
- Occupations: Director, actor, screenwriter
- Years active: 1967–2013
- Spouses: Aharona Melkind; Caroline Langford; Smadar Kilchinsky; Vered Tandler-Dayan
- Partner: Augusta Neumann
- Children: 4
- Parent(s): Moshe Dayan (father); Ruth Dayan (mother)

Assaf "Assi" Dayan (Hebrew: אסף "אסי" דיין; 23 November 1945 – 1 May 2014) was an Israeli film director, actor, screenwriter, and producer.

== Life ==
Dayan was the youngest son of Israeli general and defense minister Moshe Dayan and peace activist Ruth Dayan (née Schwartz). He had two siblings: politician and author Yael Dayan, born 1939, and sculptor Ehud (Udi) Dayan, born 1942. He attended Tichon Hadash high school in Tel Aviv. After military service and studying philosophy and English literature at Hebrew University, Dayan embarked on a career as film actor, which eventually also led to directing.

He was married and divorced four times and had four children. His first marriage was to Aharona Melkind, with whom he had a daughter, Amalia and a son, Avner. His second wife was actress Caroline Langford, daughter of Barry Langford. They had one son together, Lior. From a relationship with Augusta Neumann, he had a daughter, Assia. His third wife was actress Smadar Kilchinsky. In 1999, his fourth wife, ceramic artist Vered Tandler Dayan, made a documentary film about him, titled Living, Period.

In March 2009, Dayan was indicted on suspicion of drug use and beating his girlfriend. In the wake of an earlier conviction for possession of drugs, he received a suspended sentence and 200 hours of community work as part of a plea bargain. Dayan admitted at the time that he was in possession of cocaine for personal use.

In November 2009, Dayan suffered a massive heart attack and underwent angioplasty at Tel Aviv's Ichilov hospital.

Dayan died on 1 May 2014, at his home in Tel Aviv. Media reports noted his health issues and struggles with drug use.

== Career ==
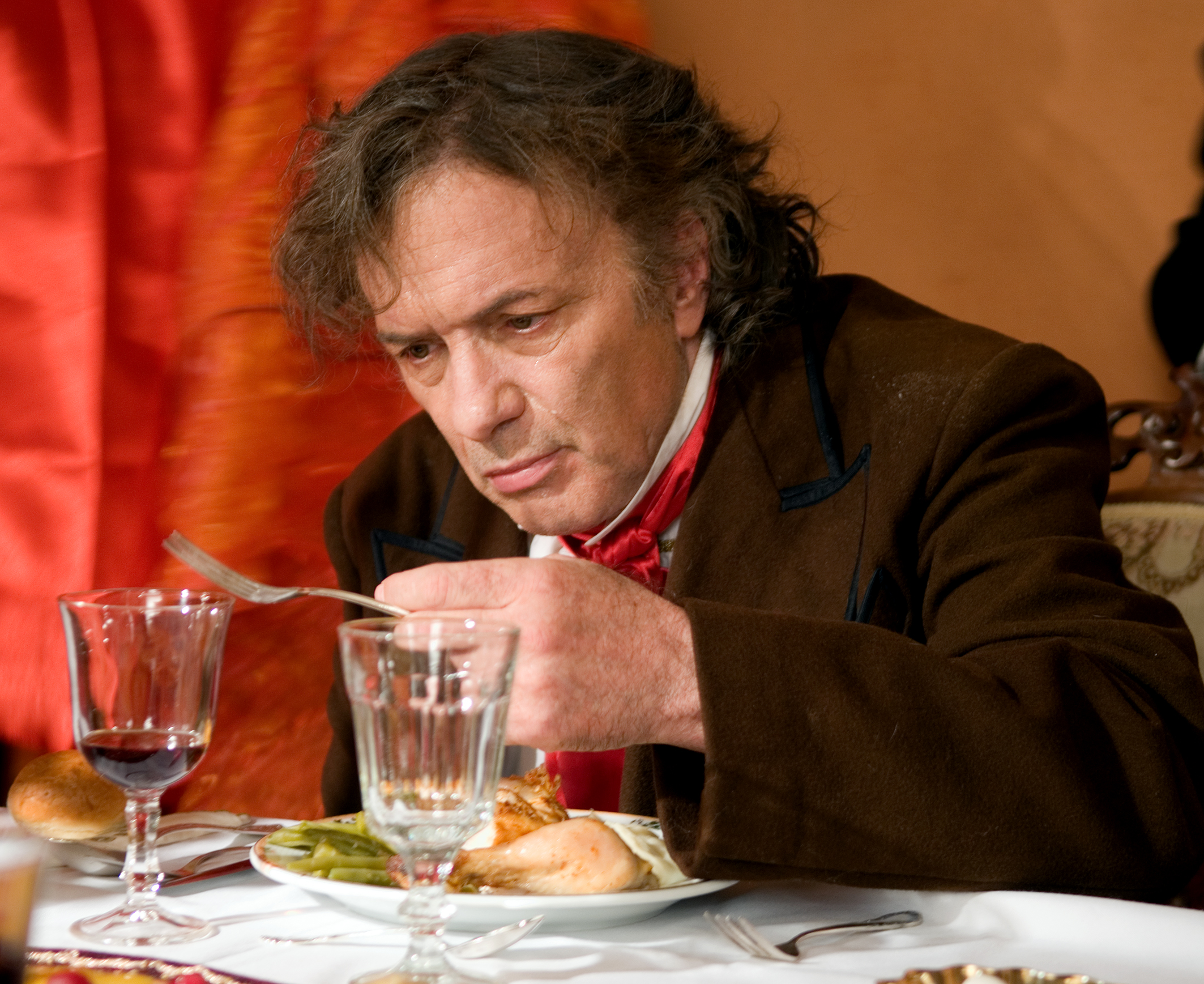
Dayan in Finita la comedia (2011) as Ludwig van Beethoven

=== Acting ===
In 1967, Dayan established himself as a film actor and Israeli icon in He Walked Through the Fields, Yossi Milo's adaptation of Moshe Shamir's novel and play by that name. That year, he appeared in Micha Shagrir's Scouting Patrol, about elite fighters on a mission to capture the commander of a fedayeen squad. In 1969 Dayan co-starred in the American movie A Walk with Love and Death, set in medieval France and directed by John Huston, in which he plays alongside Huston's daughter, Anjelica. He portrayed Giora Geter, owner of a Tel Aviv pub whose life falls apart, in Eitan Green's Into the Night. He also wrote, produced, and played the role of Banjo in Fifty-Fifty, part of the Israeli Bourekas Film genre.

In 1984, Dayan had a supporting role as a prisoner in Uri Barbash's Beyond the Walls, described as an important milestone in Israeli political cinema. Other acting credits include Operation Thunderbolt, about the Israeli raid in Entebbe, nominated for an Academy Award for Best Foreign Language Film. Dayan is the deputy of Yoni Netanyahu, played by Yehoram Gaon.

Dayan played the leading role of psychologist Reuven Dagan in the TV drama series BeTipul, which ran for two seasons on Israeli TV (2005 and 2008). The series was later adapted for the US market by HBO under the name In Treatment with Gabriel Byrne in the lead role.

By 2008 Dayan had acted in some 50 films and TV series episodes.

=== Directing ===
Dayan directed 16 films. In 1976 he directed Giv'at Halfon Eina Ona, a comedy about a group of military reservists in the Sinai. In 1992, he wrote and directed Life According to Agfa, portraying life in a Tel Aviv pub. The film was nominated for the Golden Bear at the 43rd Berlin International Film Festival and won an Honorable Mention. In 1999, he was a member of the jury at the 49th Berlin International Film Festival.

== Awards and recognition ==
Dayan won the Israeli Academy Award as Best Actor for Mr. Baum. In 1998, he received a lifetime achievement award at the Jerusalem International Film Festival. His role in Time of Favor was acclaimed by Israeli critics as his best screen role of his career.

== Selected filmography ==
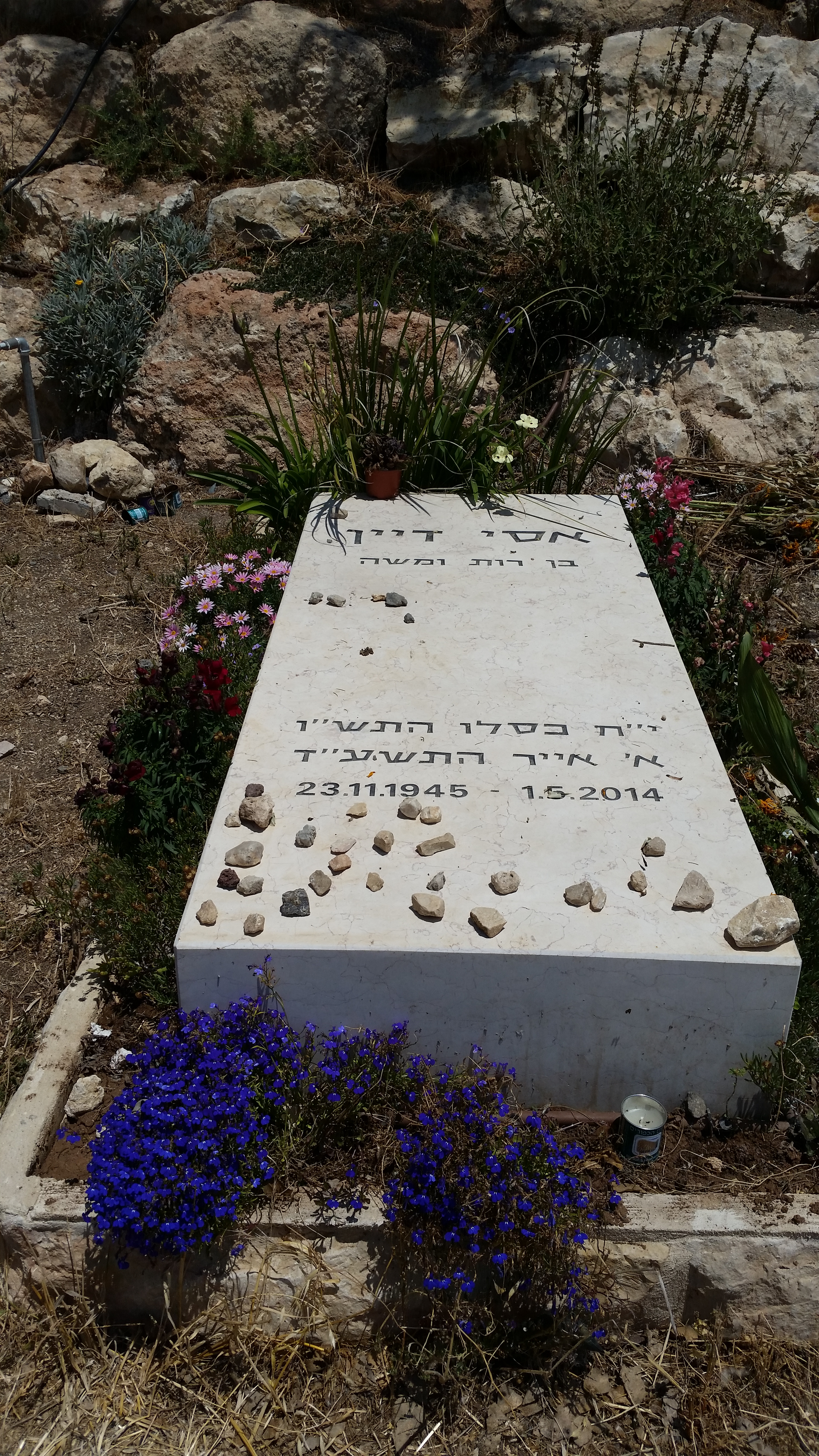
Dayan's grave in Nahalal

- The Day the Fish Came Out (1967) – Tourist
- Sayarim (1967)
- He Walked Through the Fields (1967) – Uri
- The Battle of Sinai (1968) – Jossi
- A Walk with Love and Death (1969) – Heron of Fois
- Moto Shel Yehudi (1969) – David Shimon
- Scouting Patrol (1969) – Boy
- Promise at Dawn (1970) – Romain
- "Fifty-Fifty" (1971) - Banjo
- Three and One (1974), Absalom
- Feast for the Eyes (1975)
- The Sell Out (1976) – Lt. Elan
- Halfon Hill Doesn't Answer (1976, director)
- Operation Thunderbolt (1977) – Shuki
- The Uranium Conspiracy (1978) – Dan
- Moments (1979) – Avi
- The Hit (1979, director)
- Ha-Ish She Ba Lakahat (1982)
- Tell Me That You Love Me (1983) – Jonathan
- Beyond the Walls (1984) – Assaf
- Into the Night (1985) – Giora
- The Delta Force (1986) – Raffi Amir
- Ha-Tov, HaRa, VeHaLo-Nora (1986)
- Après le vent des sables (1987)
- Ha-Yanshouf (1988) – Amnon
- Z'man Emet (1991)
- Brev til Jonas (1992)
- Life According to Agfa (1992, director)
- Zihron Devarim (1995) – Caesar
- An Electric Blanket Named Moshe (1995, director)
- No Names on the Doors (1997) – Uzi
- The 92 Minutes of Mr. Baum (1997, director) – Mickey Baum
- Time of Favor (2000) – Rabbi Meltzer
- Odot Ha-Monitin (2001)
- Zimzum (2001) – Uriel Morag
- Things Behind the Sun (2001)
- Ha-Shiva MeHodu (2002) – Abraham Lazar
- Campfire (2004) – Motkeh
- Ha-Bsora Al-Pi Elohim (2004) – God
- Lemarit Ain (2006) – Rephael
- BeTipul (2005–2008, TV Series) – Re'uven Dagan
- Bekarov, Yikre Lekha Mashehu Tov (2006) – Avram / ex-communist
- Things Behind the Sun (2006) – Itzhak
- My Father My Lord ("Summer Vacation") (2007) – Rabbi Abraham Eidelmann
- Meduzot (2007) – Eldad
- Rak Klavim Ratzim Hofshi (2007)
- Love Life (2007) – Dean Ross
- Real Time (2008)
- Dr. Pomerantz (2011, director) – Dr. Yoel Pomerantz
- Finita La Commedia (2019) – Beethoven (final film role)

== See also ==
- Israeli cinema
- Israeli television
- Culture of Israel
