= Moshe Shamir =

Israeli author, playwright, opinion writer and public figure (1921–2004)

- משה שמיר
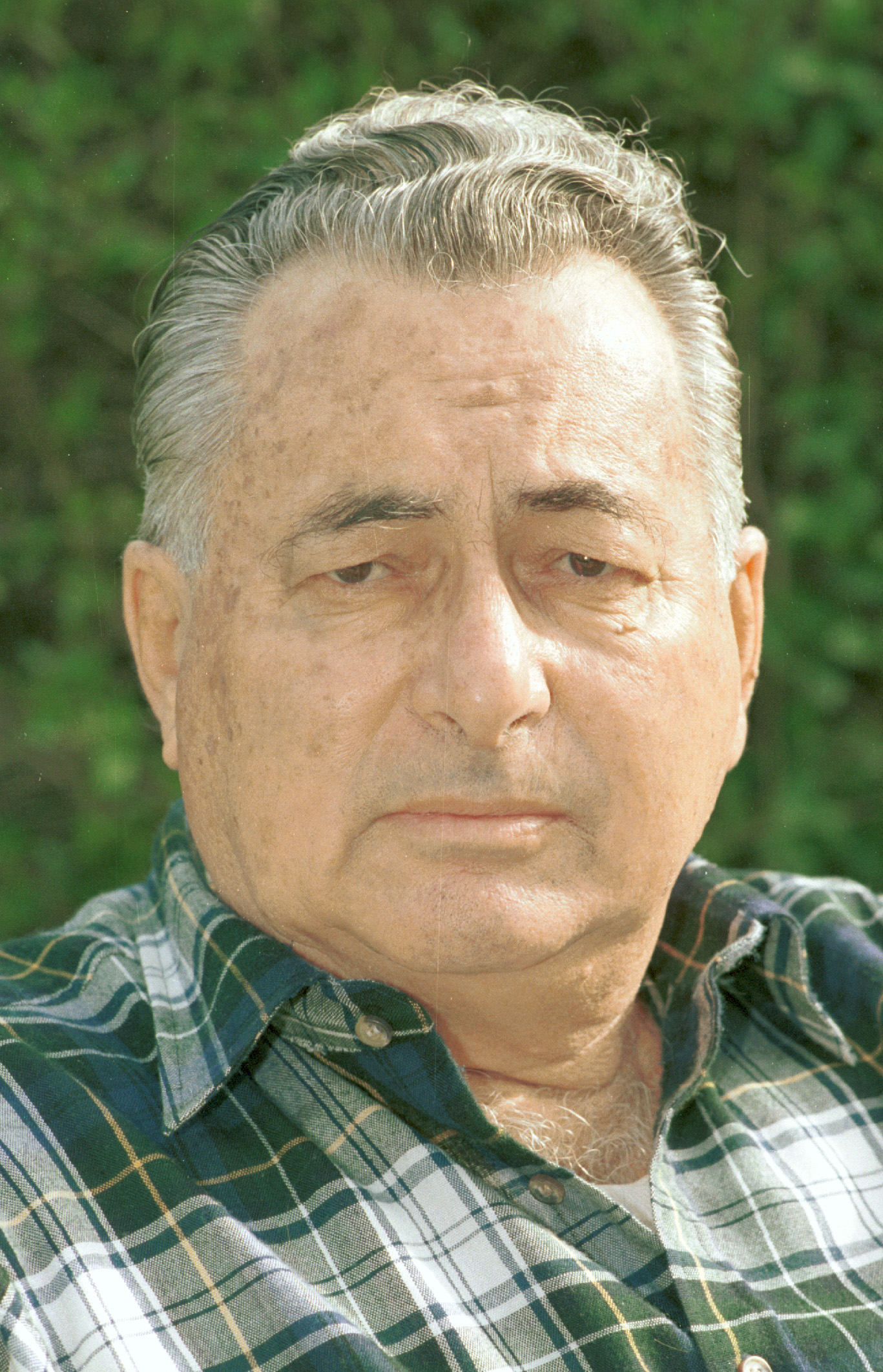

Faction represented in the Knesset
- 1977–1979: Likud
- 1979: Independent
- 1979–1981: Tehiya-Bnai

Personal details
- Born: 15 September 1921 Safed, Mandatory Palestine
- Died: 21 August 2004 (aged 82) Rishon LeZion, Israel

Moshe Shamir (Hebrew: משה שמיר; 15 September 1921 – 20 August 2004) was an Israeli author, playwright, opinion writer, and public figure. He was the author of a play that was later based on an Israeli film called He Walked Through the Fields.

== Biography ==
Shamir was born in Safed. He went to the Tel Nordau School and graduated from the Herzliya Hebrew High School in Tel Aviv.

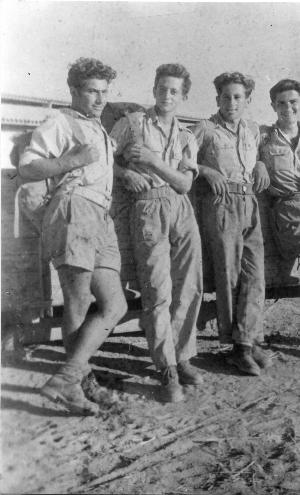
Members of the Harel Brigade, January 1949. Moshe Shamir 2nd right.

In the 1948 Arab–Israeli War he served in Palmach. He began his political career as a member of the movement Hashomer Hatzair, in which he filled a leadership role. He was one of the editors of their official newspaper Al Ha-Homa from 1939 to 1941. From 1944 to 1946 he was a member of kibbutz Mishmar HaEmek. He was the founder and editor of the Israel Defense Forces official newspaper Bamahane ("In the Camp") from 1947 to 1950. During the 1950s he was a member of the editorial board of the newspaper Maariv and the editor of its literature section.

== Literary and journalism career ==
At an early age, Shamir began writing stories. They attracted interest immediately, and not solely due to his writing ability. He was always engaged with political problems, always arousing opposition. The first opposition came from Meir Ya'ari, leader of the left-wing movement to which Shamir belonged, concerning what was perceived as "ideological aberration" in his stories. In hindsight it is difficult to understand what the fuss was about. The stories seem completely innocent and certainly are not hostile or injurious to the kibbutz movement. However, the anger that was aroused against Shamir was so strong that he decided to leave his kibbutz in 1947 for ideological reasons.

Shamir's first story, appearing in print in 1940, dealt with Abraham and the binding of Isaac. The story was published in the youth movement newspaper Al Ha-Homa. In his 1947 novel He Walked Through the Fields, which became the first play performed in the established State of Israel, the hero is a native-born Israeli, a "Sabra". The book won the Ussishkin Prize. It was adapted as a movie directed by Yosef Millo, who also directed its theatrical debut. In 1947, he became the chief editor of the Haganah (later Israel Defense Forces) newspaper Bamahane. He edited it until he was dismissed at the request of David Ben-Gurion for publishing an article about a celebration of the disbanding of Palmach. Thereafter he continually aroused scandals, more than any other Hebrew author of that time.

The hero of With His Own Hands: Elik's Story (1951) is his brother Elik who fell in the War of Independence. The book became an icon of that war. Elik's Story was translated into English, adapted into radio plays, and even merited an adaptation for television. It is one of the greatest Israeli bestsellers of all time, selling to date over 150,000 copies. It became part of the program of study in schools.

Under the Sun (1950) and That You Are Naked (1959) are autobiographical pieces based on his life in the thirties and forties. Shamir wrote additional books about the members of his family: With His Own Heart about his father, and Not Far From the Tree about his family history.

Besides The King of Flesh and Blood, his most translated book was a children's book, The Fifth Wheel (1961). It is about the adventures of a kibbutznik, dispatched to bring a tractor from the port, who at every step meets various and sundry obstacles and adventures.

Joseph Klausner was critical of The King of Flesh and Blood, whose central character is the Hasmonean king Alexander Jannæus. Menachem Begin recalled Klausner's words in a later day when Moshe Shamir, as a member of the Knesset, crossed the political lines from left to right to oppose the Egypt–Israel Peace Treaty. As the prime minister at the time, Begin spoke out against Shamir in the Knesset, indicating that Shamir's objections showed a lack of awareness of the historic moves taking place. He said to Shamir (in Hebrew):

Certainly you recall that, in his day, the late Prof. Joseph Klausner wrote, when you published your book The King of Flesh and Blood, these words: "There may sometimes be a writer who is not a historian, but to such an extent?" And now I say: "There may sometimes be a politician who does not recognize the rustling wings of history, but to such an extent?"

Moshe Shamir also wrote poetry. However, most of his trade was in prose. He was a prolific author, publishing more than 25 books in the course of his life.

He died in Rishon LeZion at the age of 83. He was survived by his wife Tzvia.

== Political career ==
He was active in Mapam. After the Six-Day War, similarly to the songwriter Naomi Shemer, he changed his political leaning. He became one of the creators of the Movement for Greater Israel (Eretz Israel HaShlema, literally "Whole Land of Israel"), a part of the La'am faction in the Likud. He was elected to the Knesset in the legislative elections of 1977. He was among the founders of the "Bnai" faction (acronym for a phrase meaning "Union of Eretz Israel Faithful") that opposed the Camp David Accords (1978). In late 1979, after the Israel-Egypt peace treaty, he broke away from Likud, along with Knesset member Geula Cohen, and found the Tehiya Bnai party. He supported the settling of the West Bank after its capture.

His shift from left to right took a toll on him as the main literary societies banned him from membership.

== Awards ==
Among the various prizes received by Shamir for his work were the following:

- In 1950, the Ussishkin Prize;
- In 1953, the Brenner Prize;
- In 1955, the Bialik Prize for literature;
- In 1988, the capstone was the Israel Prize, for Hebrew literature.

== Works in English translation ==
- He Walked Through the Fields (1959, as a play), translation of Hu Halach Ba-Sadot (1947)
- Taking the Mountains (1948, play)
- With His Own Hands (1970), translation of Be-Mo Yadav (1951)
- The King of Flesh and Blood (1958), translation of Melech Basar Va-Dam (1954)
- David's Stranger (1965), also with title The Hittite Must Die (1978), translation of Kivsat Ha-Rash (1956)
- The Fifth Wheel (1961), translation of Ha-Galgal Ha-Hamishi (1961)
- My Life With Ishmael (1970, political autobiography), translation of Hayai Im Ishmael (1968)

== See also ==
- List of Bialik Prize recipients
- List of Israel Prize recipients
