= List of Israeli films of 1989 =

A list of films produced by the Israeli film industry in 1989.

== 1989 releases ==
Premiere	Title	Director	Cast	Genre	Notes	Ref
September 13	Berlin-Jerusalem (Hebrew: ברלין-ירושלים)	Amos Gitai		Drama		

=== Unknown premiere date ===
Premiere	Title	Director	Cast	Genre	Notes	Ref
?	The Valley Train (Hebrew: רכבת העמק)	Jonathan Paz	Dan Turgeman	Drama		
?	One of Us (Hebrew: אחד משלנו)	Uri Barbash	Alon Aboutboul, Sharon Alexander, Dalia Shimko, Dan Toren	Drama		
?	Sadot Yerukim (Hebrew: שדות ירוקים, lit. "Green Fields")	Yitzhak Yeshurun		Drama		
?	Esh Tzolevet (Hebrew: אש צולבת, lit. "Crossfire")	Gideon Ganani		Drama		
?	Abba Ganuv II (Hebrew: אבא גנוב 2, lit. "Superb dad 2")	Avi Cohen	Yehuda Barkan, Ben Tzion	Drama, Comedy		
?	Ochlim Lokshim (Hebrew: אוכלים לוקשים)	Boaz Davidson and Tzvi Shissel	Yehuda Barkan	Comedy		
?	Doar Tz'vaee Hof Eilat (Hebrew: דואר צבאי חוף אילת, lit. "Eilat Beach Military Post")	Dubi Gal	Dubi Gal, Natan Nathanson	Comedy		
?	Ehad B'April (Hebrew: אחד באפריל, lit. "April first")	Menahem Zilberman		Comedy		
?	Avodah B'Eynaim (Hebrew: עבודה בעיניים, lit. "Tongue in Cheek ")	Yigal Shilon	Nathan Dattner, Avi Kushnir	Comedy		
?	Resisim (Hebrew: רסיסים, lit. "Shrapnel")	Yossi Somer	Etti Ankri	Drama		
?	Tzamot (Hebrew: צמות, lit. "Braids")	Yitzhak Halutzi	Hana Azoulay-Hasfari	Drama		
?	Nipagesh Basafari (Hebrew: נפגש בספארי, lit. "We'll meet in the safari")	Yehuda Barkan		Comedy		
?	A Thousand and One Wives (Hebrew: אלף נשותיו של נפתלי סימנטוב, lit. "The thousand wives of Naftali Simantov")	Michal Bat-Adam	Rita Yahan-Farouz, Yossi Polak	Drama		

== Awards ==
=== Ophir Award ===	=== Wolgin Award ===

== See also ==
- 1989 in Israel
