= Virtzberg =

Virtzberg (also Wirtzberg) is a surname. Notable people with the surname include:

- Beni Virtzberg, Holocaust survivor
- Dahlia Virtzberg-Rofe', researcher in the area of mental health and activist for human rights of mentally deficient people
- Ilan Virtzberg, Israeli musician, singer, songwriter, music producer
