= Amos Lavi =

Israeli actor (1953–2010)

- עמוס לביא
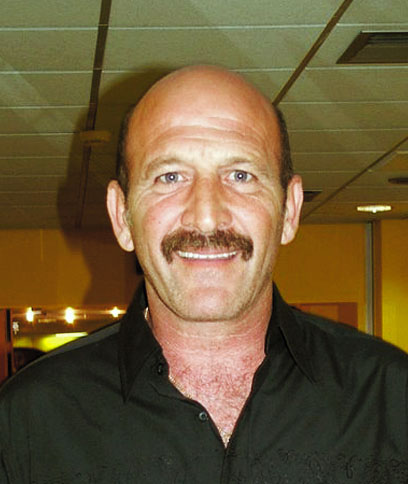
- Lavi in 2005
- Born: 1 January 1953; Tripoli, Kingdom of Libya
- Died: 9 November 2010 (aged 57); Tel Aviv, Israel
- Occupation: Actor
- Years active: 1980–2010
- Children: 4

Amos Lavi (Hebrew: עמוס לביא; 1 January 1953 – 9 November 2010) was an Israeli stage and film actor. He won three Ophir Awards for the roles he played in the films Sh'Chur, Nashim and Zirkus Palestina.

== Career ==
Lavi was born in Libya in 1953. Lavi immigrated to Israel with his family at the age of three and they settled Kiryat Gat. His father died when he was seven years old. In 1973, during the Yom Kippur War Lavi participated in the war in the reserve forces of the IDF and suffered from a posttraumatic stress disorder after the war. During his rehabilitation he was offered to study acting. In the early 1980s Lavi graduated from acting school at the Kibbutzim College of Education, Technology and the Arts.

His first film was the drama Ma'agalim (1980). Two years later Lavi acted in the film Ot Kain (1982) by Eran Preis which was directed by Uri Barbash. In 1983 he played a central role in the prestigious TV series Michel Ezra Safra and Sons by Amnon Shamosh and the film Green. In 1984 he acted in the film Ani Vehami'ahav Shel Isht.

In 1985 Lavi acted in the film Banot (written by Assi Dayan) alongside Hana Azoulay Hasfari and in the film Ad Sof Halaylah. That same year he participated in the production of the Israeli-American film Goodbye, New York by Amos Kollek. In 1986 he participated in the film Flash alongside Nitza Shaul, in Unsettled Land directed by Uri Barbash, and in Himmo Melech Yerushalaim.

In the late 1980s and early 1990s Lavi acted in several Israeli-American films. In addition, he also participated in the film Zarim Balayla alongside Yael Abecassis. In 1993 he played alongside Ronit Elkabetz and Gila Almagor in the film Sh'Chur, for which he was awarded an Ophir Award. In 1994 he participated in the TV film Driks' Brother which was directed by Doron Sabri. In 1995 he starred in the Israeli television series Ha-Mone Dofek In 1996 he starred in Yaky Yosha's film Kesher Dam and Moshe Mizrahi's film Nashim, for which he was awarded an Ophir Award.

In 1997 he played alongside Natan Zahavi in the film Shabazi and in the TV mini-series Line 300. In 1998 he acted in Shemi Zarhin's film Dangerous Acts alongside Moshe Ivgy and Gila Almagor. That same year he acted in another film called Aviv and in the film Zirkus Palestina alongside Yoram Hatab and Evgenia Dodina, for which he was awarded an Ophir Award. In 1999 he starred in the TV mini-series Isha Beafor and in the film Frank Sinatra Is Dead. During that period he also acted in several TV series and in the TV films Life's game (which was based on the life story of Lavi himself).

In 2003, he appeared in the first ever Haredi telenovela called Ha-Chatzer, as the Rebbe, and in Amos Gitai's film Alila. During that year Lavi also began playing in the Israeli Telenovela Ahava Me'ever Lapina. In 2004 Lavi acted in another Amos Gitai film called Promised Land. In 2005 he participated in the TV series Katav Plili and acted in the Haim Buzaglo film Distortion. That same year he acted in the film Schwartz Dynasty, Steven Spielberg's film Munich and Menachem Golan's film Days of Love.

In 2006 he participated in the third season of the Israeli musical daily drama Our Song as Aryeh Weiss. In 2008 he participated in the second season of the Israeli children's TV series The Island. In 2009 he played as a guest in the series The Friends of Naor in the role of the mobster Rico Calderon. In 2010 he participated in Haim Buzaglo's film Kavod and the TV series Meorav Yerushalmi.

=== Personal life ===
Lavi was married to Israeli actress Evelin Hagoel. He had four children by various relationships.

== Death ==
On 9 November 2010, Lavi died of lung cancer in Tel Aviv at the age of 57. He was buried at Yarkon Cemetery.

== Partial filmography ==
- Ma'agalim Shel Shi-Shabbat (1980)
- Lemon Popsicle (1981)
- Ot Kain (1982)
- Ani Vehami'ahav Shel Ishti (1983)
- Green (1984)
- Goodbye, New York (1985) - Paul Newman Look-alike
- Banot (1985) - Moshe
- When Night Falls (1985) - Gideon
- Deadline (1987) - Yassin Abu-Riadd
- Unsettled Land (1987) - Muhamed
- Himmo, King of Jerusalem (1987) - Marco
- Flash (1987)
- Torn Apart (1990) - Fawzi
- Blink of an Eye (1992) - Mozaffar
- The Mummy Lives (1993) - Museum Guard
- Manat Yeter (1993)
- Zarim Balayla (1993)
- Revenge of Itzik Finkelstein (1993) - Company manager
- Sh'Chur (1994) - Father
- Ha-Ach Shel Driks (1994) - Company Commander
- Nashim (1996) - Jacob
- Shabazi (1997)
- Kesher Dam (1997)
- Circus Palestine (1998) - Colonel Oz
- Frank Sinatra Is Dead (1998)
- Dangerous Acts (1998) - Arik
- Aviv (1998)
- HaAchim Mevorach (2000) - Itzko
- Tahara (2002) - Bedouin Sorcerer
- Sima Vaknin Machshefa (2003) - Rabbi
- Alila (2003) - Hezi
- Promised Land (2004) - Hezi
- Distortion (2005)
- Shoshelet Schwartz (2005) - Eliyahu
- Munich (2005) - General Yariv
- Yamim Shel Ahava (2005) - Ben Zion
- Janem Janem (2005)
- Seret hatuna (2006)
- Rikud Mesukan (2007) - Mr. Davidi
- Melech Shel Kabzanim (2007) - Feyvush
- Rak Klavim Ratzim Hofshi (2007)
- Lemon Tree (2008) - Commander Jacob
- Maftir (2008) - Reuven
- Ha-Proyect Shel Piter Shmychel (2008) - Menash
- Carmel (2009)
- Kavod (2010) - Amos Bardugo
- Srak Srak (2010) - Amos Shanir
- Od Ani Holeh (2010) - Jango (final film role)
