= Amnon Salomon =

Israeli cinematographer (1940–2011)

- אמנון סלומון
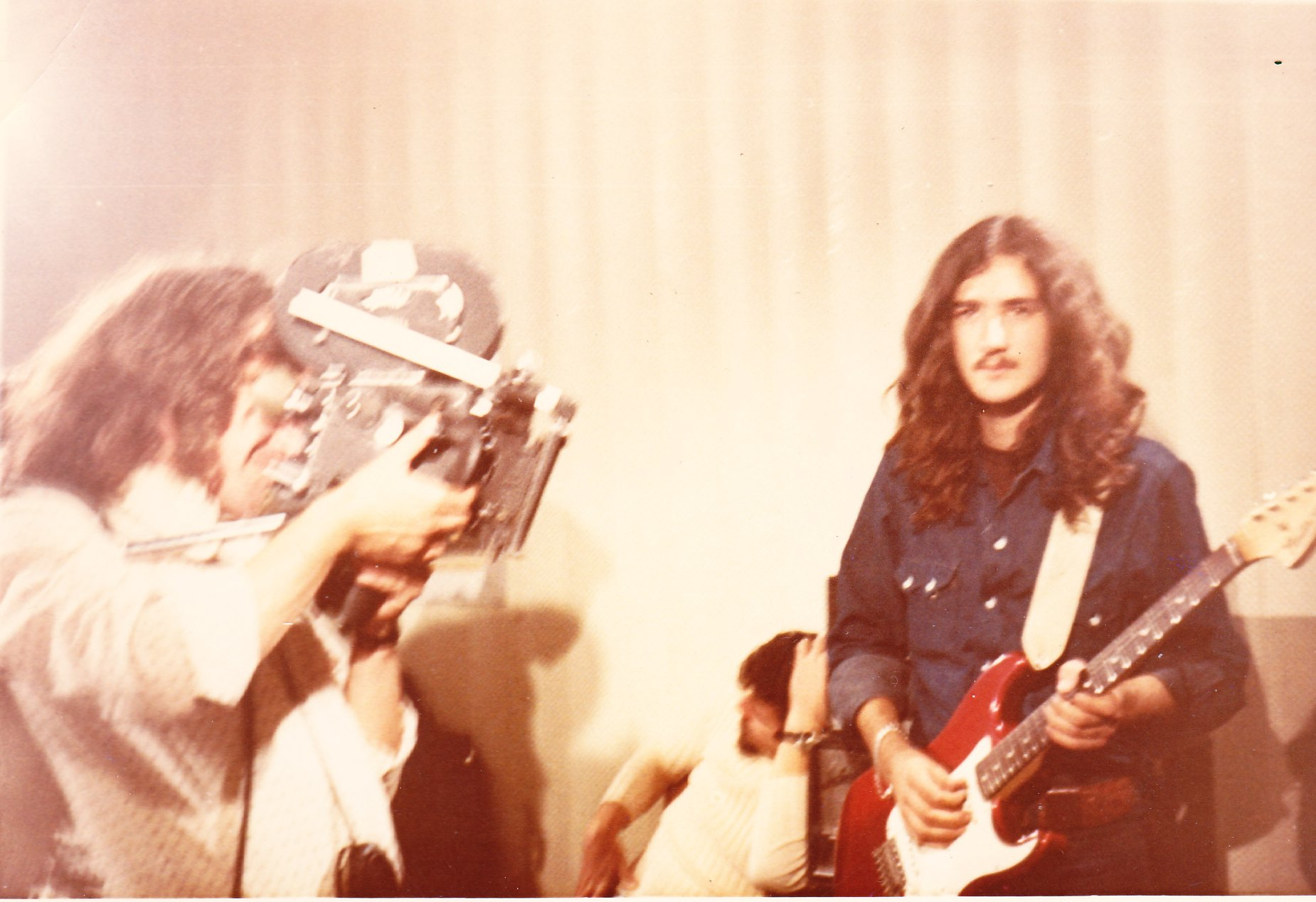
- Salomon (left) with guitarist Yoram Lubling in 1973
- Born: 3 April 1940; Tel Aviv, Mandatory Palestine
- Died: 23 October 2011 (aged 71); Bat Yam, Israel
- Occupation: Cinematographer
- Years active: 1964-2011

Amnon Salomon (Hebrew: אמנון סלומון; 3 April 1940 – 23 October 2011) was an Israeli film cinematographer. He was a recipient of the Ophir Award for cinematography.

== Biography ==
Salomon was born in Tel Aviv in 1940 to a Hungarian-Jewish father and a Russian-Jewish mother. He started his career in the Geva Studios as an assistant to photographer to the Israeli cinematographer David Gurfinkel, a position he held for four years, during which he also assisted filming Uri Zohar's 1964 avant-garde-satiric film Hole in the Moon.

During his career, Solomon filmed 65 films, of which the best-known films included Haham Gamliel (1973), Charlie Ve'hetzi (1973), Beyond the Walls (1985), Alex Is Lovesick (1986) and Cup Final (1992).

In 2003 the Israeli Academy of Film and Television awarded him a prize for his professional achievement. In 2010, in honor of his seventieth birthday, a tribute in his honor was held in the Tel Aviv Cinematheque.

In 2010 Salomon filmed his final film, Dover Koshashvili's Infiltration.

== Death ==
Salomon died on 23 October 2011, at the age of 71, following a long battle with cancer. His death was announced by his husband, Ilan. Salomon was later interred at Kiryat Shaul Cemetery.

== Selected filmography ==
- 2010 - Infiltration
- 1999 - Tzur Hadassim
- 1998 - Zolgot Hadma'ot Me'atzman
- 1998 - Pa'amaim Buskila
- 1992 - Gmar Gavi'a
- 1992 - Me'Ahorei Hasoragim II
- 1990 - Neshika Bametzach
- 1989 - Abba Ganuv II
- 1989 - Ehad Mishelanu
- 1989 - April Fool
- 1988 - Nisuim Fiktiveem
- 1987 - Unsettled Land
- 1986 - Alex Is Lovesick
- 1985 - Me'Ahorei Hasoragim
- 1985 - Goodbye, New York
- 1985 - Ad Sof Halaylah
- 1984 - Roman Za'ir
- 1984 - Sapar Nashim
- 1983 - Ovdim Al Ha'Olam
- 1982 - Adon Leon
- 1981 - Shifshuf Naim
- 1979 - Ta'ut Bamispar
- 1976 - Lupo B'New York
- 1976 - Mishpahat Tzan'ani
- 1974 - Charlie Ve'hetzi
- 1973 - Haham Gamliel
