= Natasha Lyonne =

American actress and executive (born 1979)

- Lyonne in 2026
- Born: Natasha Bianca Lyonne Braunstein; April 4, 1979 (age 47); New York City, U.S.
- Occupations: Actress; director; comedian; producer; writer; executive
- Years active: 1986–present

Natasha Bianca Lyonne Braunstein (/liˈoʊn/ lee-OHN; born April 4, 1979) is an American actress, executive producer, director and writer. Lyonne started her career as a child actress before expanding her career taking on mature roles in film and television, for which she was nominated for five Primetime Emmy Awards and two Golden Globe Awards, and named one of the 100 most influential people in the world by Time magazine in 2023. Lyonne made her first uncredited appearance in Heartburn (1986), had a recurring role in Pee-wee's Playhouse (1986), and a supporting role in Dennis the Menace (1993). She transitioned to taking on teen roles in several independent films such as Everyone Says I Love You (1996), Slums of Beverly Hills (1998), But I'm a Cheerleader (1999), and Party Monster (2003), as well as the American Pie film series (1999–2012).

She found a career resurgence and Emmy Award-nominations for her performances as Nicky Nichols in the Netflix series Orange Is the New Black (2013–2019), co-created, wrote, directed, and executive produced the Netflix series Russian Doll (2019–2022), and starred in the Peacock series Poker Face (2023–2025) and the Netflix film His Three Daughters (2024).

In 2025, she publicly revealed herself as the co-founder of the artificial intelligence film studio Asteria, founded with her boyfriend Bryn Mooser in 2022 with the intent to create animated feature films with AI tools.

== Early life and education ==
Natasha Bianca Lyonne Braunstein was born on April 4, 1979, in New York City, the daughter of Orthodox Jewish parents Ivette Buchinger and Aaron Braunstein, a boxing promoter, race car driver, and radio host. Her mother was born in Paris, to Hungarian-Jewish Holocaust survivor parents.

Lyonne has joked that her family consists of "my father's side, Flatbush, and my mother's side, Auschwitz". Her grandmother, Ella, came from a large family, but only she and her two sisters and two brothers survived, which Lyonne has attributed to their blond hair and blue eyes. Lyonne's grandfather, Morris Buchinger, operated a watch company in Los Angeles. During the war, he hid in Budapest as a non-Jew working in a leather factory.

Lyonne lived the first eight years of her life in Great Neck, New York. Then she emigrated with her family to Israel, where she stayed a year and a half. She participated in the 1989 Israeli children's film April Fool (Hebrew: אחד באפריל), which began her interest in acting.

After her parents divorced, Lyonne and her older brother Adam returned to New York City with their mother. She grew up on the Upper East Side of Manhattan, where she felt she was an outsider. Lyonne attended the Ramaz School, a private Jewish school, where she was a scholarship student who took Talmud classes and read Aramaic. She was expelled in her sophomore year for selling marijuana to classmates. Her mother moved the family to Miami and Lyonne briefly attended Miami Country Day School.

Lyonne dropped from high school before her senior year. For a short time she studied film and philosophy at New York University's Tisch School of the Arts. Her high school graduation depended on completing her first year at Tisch, but she left the program because she could not pay the tuition.

Lyonne was estranged from her father, who was a Democratic candidate for New York City Council for the sixth District of Manhattan in 2013, and lived on the Upper West Side until his death in October 2014. She has said she was not close to her mother, who died in 2013, and has essentially lived independently of her family since age 16.

== Career ==
=== 1986–1999: Beginnings and film breakout ===
As a young child, Lyonne was signed by the Ford Modeling Agency. She was cast as recurring character Opal on Pee-wee's Playhouse at age seven, where she appeared between September and December 1986, and made her film debut that same year with a small part in the Mike Nichols comedy-drama Heartburn. Of her time working as a child actor, Lyonne later said, "I had to become coherent and a businesswoman at six. By 10, I was a jaded professional ... I don't think [my parents] knew better. It was a decision of [theirs] built on hopeful ignorance".

After playing a supporting role as Polly in Dennis the Menace (1993), Lyonne was cast at age 16 in the Woody Allen-directed musical comedy Everyone Says I Love You (1996), where she co-starred as D.J., the daughter of main character Joe (played by Allen). This led to a headline role in the independent coming-of-age comedy Slums of Beverly Hills (1998), for which she received positive notices for her portrayal of Vivian Abromowitz. Writing for The Washington Post, Michael O'Sullivan said, "Lyonne is marvelous in conveying Vivian's combination of confusion, curiosity, disgust and desire at what body and psyche are going through. After playing a string of people's daughters [in other films], Lyonne really comes into her own here as an actress, registering as a person and not merely someone's little girl".

In 1999, Lyonne starred as Megan Bloomfield, a sexually confused teenager, in the satirical romantic comedy But I'm a Cheerleader. Despite a mixed critical reception upon release, the film was instrumental in raising awareness of the harms of conversion therapy, and has since developed a cult following. In the same year, Lyonne played the small but crucial part of Jessica in American Pie (1999)—which grossed over US$230 million at the box office—reprising the role in two of the film's sequels. Other film appearances in 1999 included Christine in Detroit Rock City and a headline role in Freeway II: Confessions of a Trickbaby. The latter, a follow-up to the 1996 original, was poorly received due to its violence and vulgarity, but Lyonne's portrayal of teenage prostitute Crystal Van Meuther was praised for its "earthy, hard-boiled" nature.

=== 2000–2010: Mainstream and independent films ===
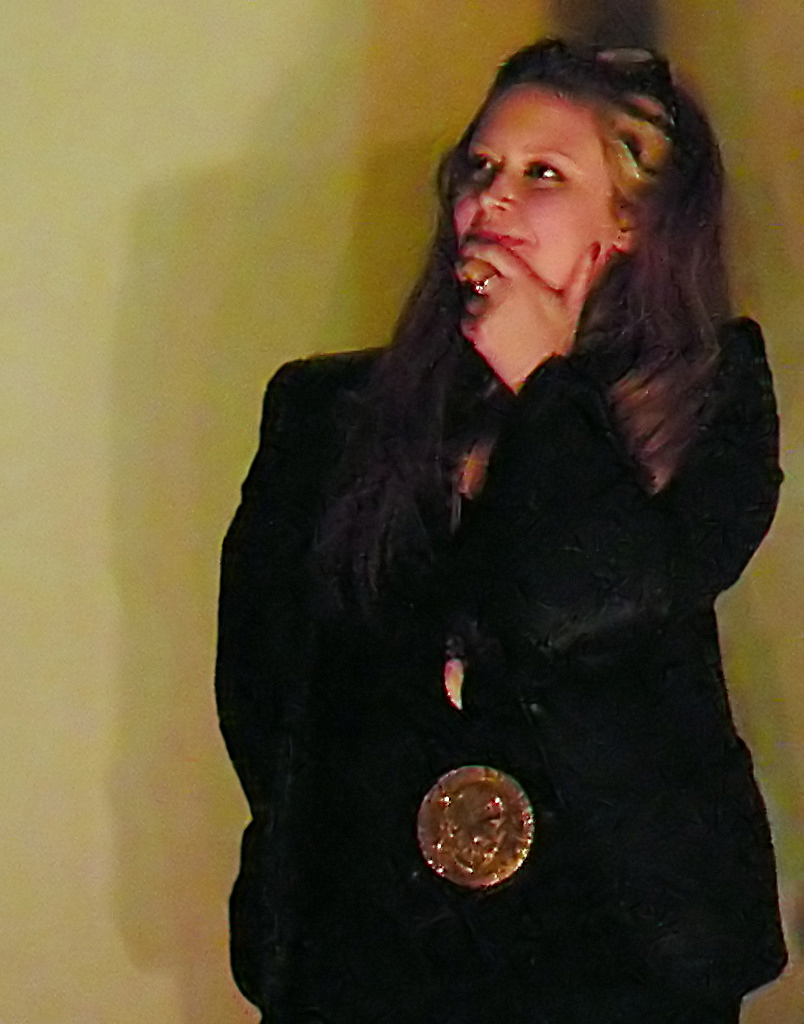
Lyonne at a screening of The Immaculate Conception of Little Dizzle in 2009.

Lyonne played the part of Jeanne, a college activist fighting for lesbian equality, in the acclaimed 2000 television film If These Walls Could Talk 2. She then appeared in the well-received Holocaust drama The Grey Zone (2001), and continued to work steadily through the early 2000s, in mainstream projects such as Scary Movie 2 and Kate & Leopold (both 2001), and Blade: Trinity (2004), as well as smaller productions such as Zig Zag (2002), Die, Mommie, Die! and Party Monster (both 2003), Madhouse (2004), and My Suicidal Sweetheart (2005).

In 2009, Lyonne headlined the experimental dark comedy The Immaculate Conception of Little Dizzle, which was described as "relentlessly strange, courageous, and hyperactive" by The Austin Chronicle. In the 2010 horror parody All About Evil, her portrayal of a psychotic serial killer was particularly well received, with Film Threat commenting: "[its director] rightfully treats Lyonne as the superstar she is, giving us glimpses of the dark residing in [her] that made Freeway 2: Confessions of a Trick Baby [sic] the final cult masterpiece of the 20th century", noting that "her ability to unleash firehoses of ferocity is on full display here".

Lyonne made her New York stage debut in the 2008 production of Mike Leigh's Two Thousand Years at the Acorn Theatre. She was part of the original cast (October 2009–March 2010) of Love, Loss, and What I Wore—an off-Broadway play by Nora Ephron and Delia Ephron, based on the book by Ilene Beckerman.

In 2010, Lyonne received positive notices for her performance in Kim Rosenstock's comedy Tigers Be Still at the Roundabout Theatre Company, with Charles Isherwood commenting in his review for The New York Times: "Ms. Lyonne [is] a thorough delight in the flat-out funniest role, the grief-crazed Grace, so deeply immersed in self-pity that she has cast aside any attempts at decorum". Lyonne starred in the 2011 production of Tommy Nohilly's Blood from a Stone at the Acorn Theatre. The following year, she participated in a benefit performance of Women Behind Bars.

=== 2011–2022: career resurgence and awards success ===
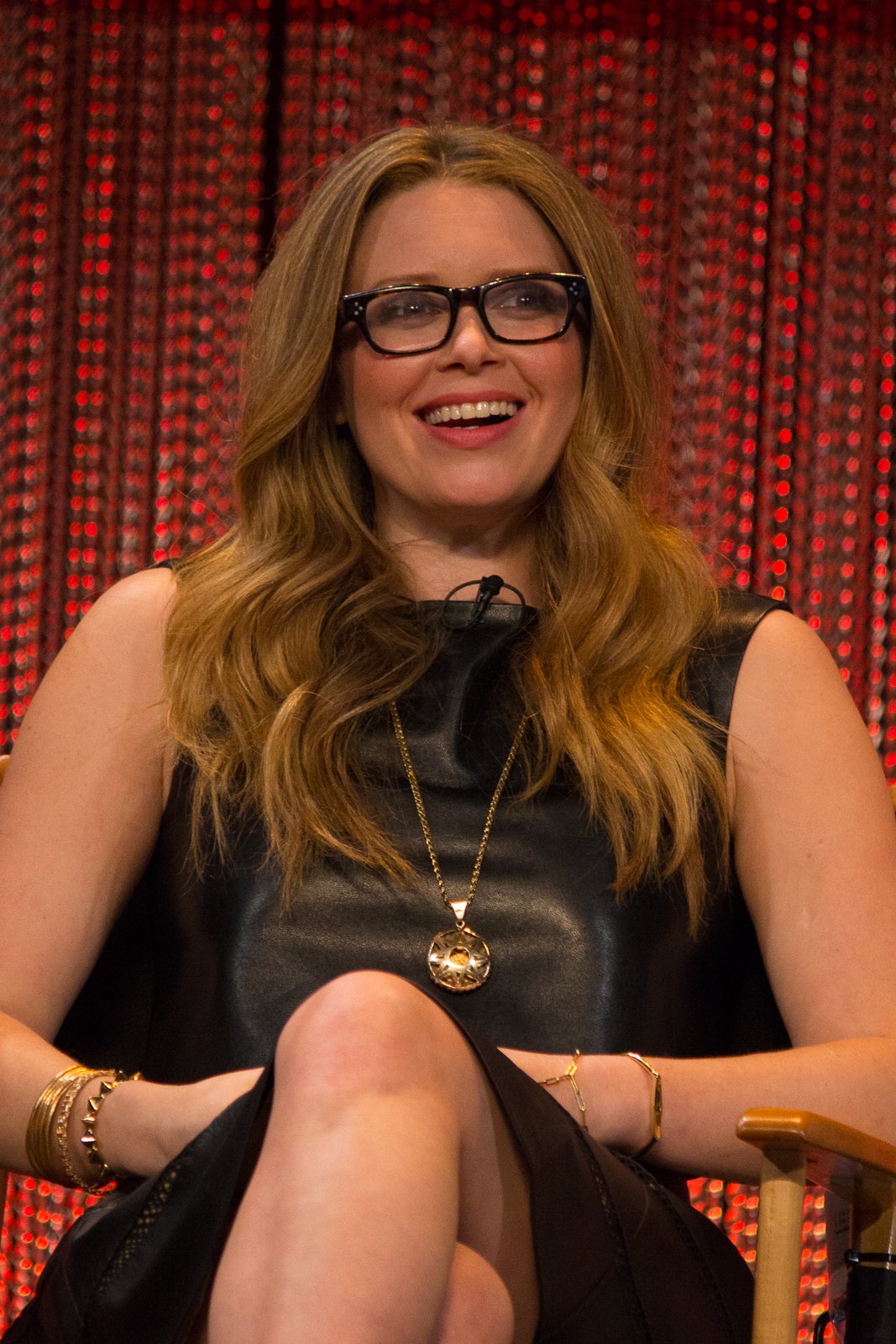
Lyonne at The Paley Center for Media's PaleyFest 2014 honoring Orange Is the New Black

Lyonne had a supporting role in Abel Ferrara's post-apocalyptic drama 4:44 Last Day on Earth (2011), which Movieline called "weirdly compelling". Two years later, she began appearing on the Netflix comedy-drama series Orange Is the New Black; her first television job as a series regular. Critics were effusive about her portrayal of prison inmate Nicky Nichols, for which she received a nomination for the 2014 Primetime Emmy Award for Outstanding Guest Actress in a Comedy Series, and was twice awarded—alongside her co-stars—the Screen Actors Guild Award for Outstanding Ensemble in a Comedy Series (2015; 2017).

Lyonne's work as hard-partying Lou in Antibirth (2016), a psychedelic horror feature inspired by the films of David Cronenberg, drew special attention; Alex McLevy wrote in a review for The A.V. Club, "The actor has experienced a remarkable resurgence in the past few years ... Here, she channels her storied past to play Lou... drug-addled... plays to Lyonne's strengths—a bluntly outsized personality, brash but likable, with a self-destructive streak bigger than the podunk town in which the story unfolds". Other film credits of hers include Sleeping with Other People, Hello, My Name Is Doris, Addicted to Fresno, Hashtag Horror (all 2015); Yoga Hosers, The Intervention (both 2016); Handsome (2017), Show Dogs (2018), Honey Boy (2019), and James Gray's science fiction thriller Ad Astra (2019).

Lyonne made her directorial debut in the fall of 2017 with a surrealist short film, Cabiria, Charity, Chastity, for fashion brand KENZO. Shot by cinematographer Chung-Hoon-Chung, the film follows Chastity, a vaudeville performer, coming to terms with her past. In addition to writing and directing episodes of Russian Doll and Poker Face, Lyonne directed an episode of Orange is the New Black in its final season, and one episode each of the Hulu shows Shrill and High Fidelity.

After the final season of Orange Is the New Black, Lyonne began starring as Nadia Vulvokov—a woman trapped in a time loop at her 36th birthday party—on Russian Doll, a comedy-drama series she created and produced along with Leslye Headland and Amy Poehler. Debuting on Netflix in February 2019, the show was met with rave reviews, with Lucy Mangan of The Guardian calling it "fine [and] impressive," adding, "Nadia is a magnificent creation and Lyonne gives a performance to match". Meanwhile, Alan Sepinwall wrote in his review for Rolling Stone:

After battles with addiction and other health scares [in] the early-2000s, [Lyonne] has managed to revive her career ... a personal narrative arc that clearly informs Nadia's constant brushes with her own mortality ... Lyonne is such an idiosyncratic screen presence — not to mention so distinctly New York/Jewish/aggro — that most of the roles she's played, particularly as an adult, have barely bothered to delve beneath the surface of that persona ... Nadia, on the other hand, is unmistakably Lyonne ... It goes deeper and wider than anything she's gotten to play [since] her teenage days in indie films like Slums of Beverly Hills and But I'm a Cheerleader.

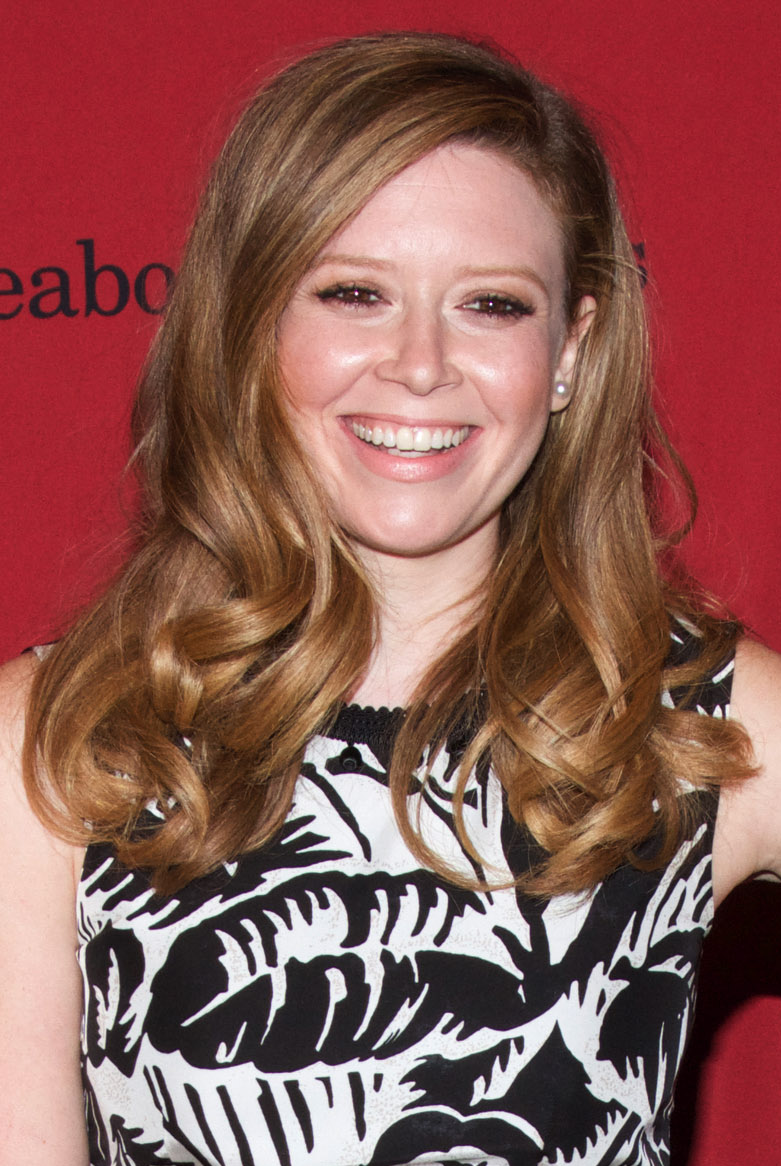
Lyonne at the 2014 Peabody Awards

Russian Doll has had two seasons, earning Lyonne three Primetime Emmy nominations: Outstanding Comedy Series, Outstanding Writing for a Comedy Series, and Outstanding Lead Actress in a Comedy Series.

Lyonne portrayed American actress Tallulah Bankhead in Lee Daniels' The United States vs. Billie Holiday, a biographical drama based on the life and career of jazz singer Billie Holiday, in 2021. She made a cameo appearance as herself in the Rian Johnson-directed mystery thriller Glass Onion: A Knives Out Mystery the following year, and hosted the season 47 finale of Saturday Night Live, where she performed a five-minute monologue about her career and personal troubles.

=== 2022–present: Artificial intelligence film studio ===
In 2022, Lyonne co-founded artificial intelligence film studio Asteria with her boyfriend Bryn Mooser, the company operating with the intent to create animated feature films with AI tools that would author, animate, manage, produce the soundtrack for, and turn out the films using responsibly sourced data.

In January 2023, she starred as Charlie Cale—a casino worker with an innate ability to detect lies—on the Peacock series Poker Face. Inspired by television murder mysteries such as Columbo, the series was positively reviewed, with Nick Hilton of The Independent calling it "satisfyingly pacy and pulpy", while saying of Lyonne, "[she's] a bundle of unhinged charisma". The show returned for a second season in 2025.

In December 2024, Lyonne voiced the character Byrdie in two episodes of the animated series What If...?. In 2025 she appeared as Rachel Rozman in The Fantastic Four: First Steps.

In June 2025, Lyonne revealed the existence of Asteria and her position as its co-founder.

Lyonne stars in two of Bill Oakley's Audible Original comedies, Space: 1969 and its sequel Space: 1972.

== Companies ==
In 2019, Lyonne co-founded the production company Animal Pictures with Maya Rudolph. Its first greenlit project was the sketch comedy special Sarah Cooper: Everything's Fine (2020), which Lyonne directed. The company also produces Russian Doll, Poker Face, Loot, and the animated series The Second Best Hospital in the Galaxy. It was announced in October 2023 that Rudolph had parted ways with the company, leaving Lyonne to operate by herself under the Animal banner. In May 2024, she signed a deal with production company Sister, who will collaborate with Lyonne on upcoming Animal projects. In September 2024, Deadline announced that Animal Pictures, along with Objective Fictions, would produce a new "retro series for Sky titled Force & Majeure" starring Lyonne and Matt Berry.

=== Asteria ===
In 2022, Lyonne co-founded the artificial intelligence film studio Asteria with her boyfriend Bryn Mooser, which aims to create animated feature films using AI tools and responsibly sourced data. In June 2025, Lyonne publicly announced the existence of Asteria and her position as its co-founder to the world at large, speaking of her late neighbour David Lynch's reputed support of her ambition. Asteria is owned by Moonvalley.

== Style and influences ==
Regarding her directorial style, Lyonne has expressed frustration with the "simplicity" of modern filmmaking, saying that she likes to counteract this by "filling the frame with an abundance of information", adding: "I do think there's a danger in telling people that brightly lit, crisp things that make perfect sense are good storytelling". She also believes that research is key to a successful narrative: "Read as many books, watch as many movies, and listen to as much music as you can so that you actually understand the stories that you're telling".

Lyonne has cited John Cassavetes, Peter Falk, Lou Reed, Nora Ephron, and Delia Ephron as being professional inspirations. Her favorite film performances include Giulietta Masina in Nights of Cabiria (1957), Gena Rowlands in A Woman Under the Influence (1974), David Thewlis in Naked (1993), and Roy Scheider in All That Jazz (1979).

In 2019, Lyonne and Chloë Sevigny helped organize a crowdfund to restore the 1980 film Out of the Blue from its original elements. Both actresses have cited the film as an influence.

== Public image ==
Lyonne has been featured on the covers of magazines including Backstage, Bust, Diva, Glamour, Harper's Bazaar, The Hollywood Reporter, Interview, Nylon, Out, Paper, Variety, Venus, and TheWrap.

For her position in the LGBT community as a straight ally, in 2015 Lyonne was awarded the Human Rights Campaign's Ally for Equality Award.

== Personal life ==
In 1997, Lyonne used her paycheck from Everyone Says I Love You to buy an apartment near Gramercy Park. As of 2023, she lives in New York City's East Village and owns a residence in Los Angeles.

=== Relationships ===
Estranged from her biological family, Lyonne has discussed the importance of the chosen family she has developed through friends and collaborators. She counts Katherine Waterston, Amy Poehler, Maya Rudolph, and Janicza Bravo among her personal friends; she is particularly close to Melanie Lynskey and Clea DuVall. She said of her friendship with Chloë Sevigny, "[She is] more than my best friend, she might have actually morphed into [being] my sister". Lyonne is also close to Aubrey Plaza.

On 26 January 2026, Lyonne posted on Twitter, "#comingout #queer."

Lyonne dated Edward Furlong in the late 1990s and Andrew Zipern in the early 2010s. She began dating comedian and actor Fred Armisen in 2014, but confirmed in April 2022 that the relationship had ended. By 2022, Lyonne was dating Bryn Mooser, with whom she founded the artificial intelligence film studio Asteria. Lyonne publicly announced the two's status and plans in June 2025.

=== Health and legal issues ===
During the early 2000s, Lyonne experienced legal problems and was arrested for driving under the influence of alcohol, and for incidents involving threatening her neighbors. In 2005, she was evicted by her landlord, actor Michael Rapaport, following complaints by other tenants about her behavior.

In 2005, Lyonne was admitted—under a pseudonym—to Beth Israel Medical Center in Manhattan, suffering from hepatitis C, infective endocarditis, and a collapsed lung; she was also undergoing methadone treatment for heroin addiction. In January 2006, a warrant was issued for her arrest after she missed a court hearing relating to her prior legal problems. Her lawyer said an emergency had arisen, but did not give details. Later in the same year, Lyonne was admitted to a drug and alcohol treatment center; she appeared in court afterwards, and the judge entered a conditional discharge. She has been open about her addiction and recovery. After an extended period of sobriety beginning in December 2006, she relapsed in 2026.

Lyonne underwent open-heart surgery in 2012 to correct heart valve damage caused by her previous heart infection. She quit smoking in 2023 but resumed in 2024.

=== Interests ===
A fan of crossword puzzles, Lyonne designed one for The New York Times in 2019. During the 2023 WGA strike, she auctioned off the opportunity for fans to solve a New York Times crossword with her to raise money for the Union Solidarity Coalition. Her other interests include philosophy and classic cinema.

Lyonne has a pet Maltipoo dog named Rootbeer, who regularly makes appearances on her social media and in interviews.

== Works and performances ==
=== Film ===
Year	Title	Role	Notes
1986	Heartburn	Rachel's Niece	Uncredited
1989	April Fool	Natasha	
1990	A Man Called Sarge	Arab Girl	
1993	Dennis the Menace	Polly	
1996	Everyone Says I Love You	Djuna "DJ" Berlin	
1998	Slums of Beverly Hills	Vivian Abromowitz	
1998	Krippendorf's Tribe	Shelly Krippendorf	
1998	Modern Vampires	Rachel	
1999	American Pie	Jessica	
1999	Detroit Rock City	Christine Sixteen	
1999	Freeway II: Confessions of a Trickbaby	Crystal "White Girl" Van Meuther	Also associate producer
1999	But I'm a Cheerleader	Megan Bloomfield	
1999	The Auteur Theory	Rosemary Olson	
2001	Plan B	Kaye	
2001	Fast Sofa	Tamara Jenson	
2001	Scary Movie 2	Megan Voorhees	
2001	American Pie 2	Jessica	
2001	The Grey Zone	Rosa	
2001	Kate & Leopold	Darci	
2002	Comic Book Villains	Judy Link	
2002	Zig Zag	Jenna the Working Girl	
2002	Night at the Golden Eagle	Amber	
2003	Die, Mommie, Die!	Edith Sussman	
2003	Party Monster	Brooke	
2004	America Brown	Vera	
2004	Madhouse	Alice	
2004	Blade: Trinity	Sommerfield	
2005	Robots	Loretta Geargrinder (voice)	
2005	My Suicidal Sweetheart	Grace	
2008	Tricks of a Woman	Sally	
2009	The Immaculate Conception of Little Dizzle	Tracy	
2009	Jelly	Mona Hammel	
2009	Goyband	Fani	
2009	Running Away with Blackie	Motel Clerk	Short film
2009	Outrage: Born in Terror	Molly	
2009	Heterosexuals	Ellia	
2010	All About Evil	Deborah Tennis	
2011	4:44 Last Day on Earth	Tina	
2011	Night Club	Mrs. Keaton	
2012	American Reunion	Jessica	
2013	7E	Yael	
2013	He's Way More Famous Than You	Herself	
2013	The Rambler	Cheryl	
2013	G.B.F.	Ms. Hogel	
2013	Girl Most Likely	Allyson	
2013	Clutter	Lisa Bradford	
2014	Loitering with Intent	Kaplan	
2015	Addicted to Fresno	Martha Jackson	
2015	Sleeping with Other People	Kara	
2015	Hello, My Name Is Doris	Sally	
2015	Bloomin Mud Shuffle	Jock	
2015	#Horror	Emma	
2016	Yoga Hosers	Tabitha Collette	
2016	The Intervention	Sarah	
2016	Darby Forever	The Baddest Girl	Short film
2016	Antibirth	Lou	Also producer
2016	Adam Green's Aladdin	Mom	
2016	The Realest Real	Herself	Short film
2016	Jack Goes Home	Nancy	
2017	Girlfriend's Day	Miss Taft	
2017	Handsome	Det. Fleur Scozzari	
2017	Cabiria, Charity, Chastity	Jules	Short film; Also producer, writer, and director
2018	A Futile and Stupid Gesture	Anne Beatts	
2018	Family	Rebecca the Juggalette	
2018	Show Dogs	Mattie	
2018	Doulo	Rena	Short film
2019	Honey Boy	Mrs. Lort	
2019	Ad Astra	Tanya Pincus	
2019	Uncut Gems	Boston Player Personnel (voice)	
2020	Have a Good Trip: Adventures in Psychedelics	Herself	
2020	Irresistible	Tina De Tessant	
2021	The United States vs. Billie Holiday	Tallulah Bankhead	
2022	Sirens	None	Executive producer
2022	Crush	None	Producer
2022	DC League of Super-Pets	Merton (voice)	
2022	Glass Onion: A Knives Out Mystery	Herself	Cameo
2023	His Three Daughters	Rachel	Also executive producer
2024	An Almost Christmas Story	Pat (voice)	Short film
2025	Smurfs	Mama Poot (voice)	
2025	The Fantastic Four: First Steps	Rachel Rozman	
2025	The Bad Guys 2	Doom / "Susan" (voice)	
2026	Roommates	Hannah Weisz	
2026	Pathetic Fallacy	Spider (voice)	
2026	Klara and the Sun	Store Manager	
TBA	2034 †	None	Post-production; Story writer

=== Television ===
Year	Title	Role	Notes
1986	Pee-wee's Playhouse	Opal	6 episodes
2000	Will & Grace	Gillian	Episode: "Girl Trouble"
2000	If These Walls Could Talk 2	Jeanne	Television film
2001	Night Visions	Bethany Daniels	Episode: "If a Tree Falls"
2002	Grounded for Life	Gretchen	Episode: "Relax!"
2007	The Knights of Prosperity	Female Co-Star	Episode: "Operation: Rent Money"
2009	Loving Leah	Esther	Television film
2011	New Girl	Gretchen	Episode: "Wedding"
2011	Law & Order: Special Victims Unit	Gia Eskas	Episode: "Educated Guess"
2012	Weeds	Tiffani	2 episodes
2013	NTSF:SD:SUV::	Mrs. Barbato	Episode: "Comic Con-Air"
2013–2019	Orange Is the New Black	Nicky Nichols	Main role; 81 episodes; Director: "The Hidey Hole"
2015	Girls	Rickey	Episode: "Iowa"
2015	Comedy Bang! Bang!	Katie	Episode: "Dax Shepard Wears a Heather Grey Shirt and Black Blazer"
2015	Sanjay and Craig	Chido (voice)	Episode: "Bike-o Psycho"
2015–2016	Inside Amy Schumer	Various	2 episodes
2015–2018	Portlandia	Various	5 episodes
2016	The $100,000 Pyramid	Herself	Episode: "Natasha Lyonne vs. Terry Crews"
2016–2019	Steven Universe	Smoky Quartz (voice)	3 episodes
2016–2022	The Simpsons	Sophie Krustofsky (voice)	4 episodes
2018–2023	Ballmastrz: 9009	Gaz Digzy (voice)	Main role; 21 episodes
2018	Corporate	Gretchen	Episode: "Corporate Retreat"
2018	Animals.	VHS Copy of Can't Hardly Wait (voice)	Episode: "Stuff"
2018–2025	Big Mouth	Suzette; Nadia Vulvokov; Ms. Dunn (voice)	10 episodes
2019–2022	Russian Doll	Nadia Vulvokov	Main role; 15 episodes Also executive producer, writer, and director
2019	Documentary Now!	Carla Meola	Episode: "Long Gone"
2019	RuPaul's Drag Race	Herself	Episode: "L.A.D.P.!"
2019	An Emmy for Megan	Herself	Episode: "New Minimum Length"
2019	Explained	Narrator (voice)	Episode: "Pirates"
2019	Steven Universe Future	Smoky Quartz (voice)	Episode: "Guidance"
2019	Cake	Gretchen	Episode: "Cache Flow"
2019	John Mulaney & the Sack Lunch Bunch	Herself	Television special
2020	Shrill	None	Director: "WAHAM"
2020	Awkwafina Is Nora from Queens	Woman in Hair Salon	Episode: "Not Today"; Director: "Paperwork"
2020	High Fidelity	None	Director: "Weird... But Warm"
2020	Crossing Swords	Norah (voice)	Episode: "Eat Plague Love"
2020	Bless the Harts	Debbie Donatello (voice)	Episode: "Violet's Secret"
2020	Sarah Cooper: Everything's Fine	None	Director
2021	Ten Year Old Tom	Irene (voice)	Episode: "The Principal is Banging My Mom/Elderly Gerbil"
2022	Saturday Night Live	Herself (host)	Episode: "Natasha Lyonne/Japanese Breakfast"
2022–present	Loot	None	Executive producer
2023–2025	Poker Face	Charlie Cale	Main role; 22 episodes Also executive producer, writer and director
2023	The Eric Andre Show	Herself	Episode: "Don't You Say A Word"
2023	HouseBroken	Various voices	2 episodes
2024–2025	The Second Best Hospital in the Galaxy	Nurse Tup (voice)	Main role; also executive producer
2024	Fantasmas	Suzanna	2 episodes
2024	What If...?	Byrdie the Duck (voice)	2 episodes
2026	Euphoria	Hooker	Episode: "Rain or Shine"

=== Theater ===
Year	Title	Role	Playwright	Venue	Ref.
2008	Two Thousand Years	Tammy	Mike Leigh	Acorn Theatre	
2009–2010	Love, Loss, and What I Wore	Performer	Nora Ephron and Delia Ephron	Westside Theater	
2010	Tigers Be Still	Grace	Kim Rosenstock	Roundabout Theatre Company	
2011	Blood from a Stone	Sarah	Tommy Nohilly	Acorn Theatre	
2012	Women Behind Bars	Cheri	Tom Eyen	Acorn Theater (benefit performance)	
2013	Crimes of the Heart	Chick Boyle	Beth Henley	Acorn Theater (stage reading)	

=== Music videos ===
Year	Song	Artist	Notes
2003	"Way Out West"	Verbena	
2015	"Lampshades on Fire"	Modest Mouse	
2016	"333"	Against Me!	
2026	„My Frosty‘s Funeral“	Wendy‘s	

== Awards and nominations ==
Organizations	Year	Category	Project	Result	Ref.
Astra TV Awards	2024	Best Streaming Series, Comedy	Poker Face	Nominated	
Astra TV Awards	2024	Best Actress in a Streaming Series, Comedy	Poker Face	Nominated	
Astra TV Awards	2025	Best Actress in a Comedy Series	Poker Face	Won	
Chicago Film Critics Association	1999	Most Promising Actress	Slums of Beverly Hills	Nominated	
Chicago Film Critics Association	2024	Best Supporting Actress	His Three Daughters	Won	
Critics' Choice Television Awards	2024	Best Actress in a Comedy Series	Poker Face	Nominated	
Dorian Awards	2019	TV Performance of the Year – Actress	Russian Doll	Nominated	
Dorian Awards	2022	Best TV Performance	Russian Doll	Nominated	
Dorian Awards	2023	Best TV Performance – Comedy	Poker Face	Nominated	
Fangoria Chainsaw Awards	2017	Best Actress	Antibirth	Nominated	
Golden Door Film Festival	2011	Best Female Lead	Night Club	Won	
Golden Globe Awards	2020	Best Actress – Television Series Musical or Comedy	Russian Doll	Nominated	
Golden Globe Awards	2024	Best Actress – Television Series Musical or Comedy	Poker Face	Nominated	
Gotham Awards	2019	Breakthrough Series – Short Form	Russian Doll	Nominated	
Gotham Awards	2024	Outstanding Supporting Performance	His Three Daughters	Nominated	
Hugo Awards	2020	Best Dramatic Presentation – Long Form	Russian Doll	Nominated	
Monaco International Film Festival	2008	Best Supporting Female	Tricks of a Woman	Won	
Primetime Emmy Awards	2014	Outstanding Guest Actress in a Comedy Series	Orange Is the New Black (episode: "WAC Pack")	Nominated	
Primetime Emmy Awards	2019	Outstanding Comedy Series	Russian Doll (season one)	Nominated	
Primetime Emmy Awards	2019	Outstanding Lead Actress in a Comedy Series	Russian Doll (episode: "Nothing in This World Is Easy")	Nominated	
Primetime Emmy Awards	2019	Outstanding Writing for a Comedy Series	Russian Doll (episode: "Nothing in This World Is Easy")	Nominated	
Primetime Emmy Awards	2024	Outstanding Lead Actress in a Comedy Series	Poker Face (episode: "Dead Man's Hand")	Nominated	
Satellite Awards	2019	Best Television Series – Musical or Comedy	Russian Doll	Nominated	
Satellite Awards	2019	Best Actress – Television Series Musical or Comedy	Russian Doll	Nominated	
Saturn Awards	2019	Best Streaming Science Fiction, Action & Fantasy Series	Russian Doll	Nominated	
Saturn Awards	2019	Best Actress in Streaming Presentation	Russian Doll	Nominated	
Screen Actors Guild Awards	2014	Outstanding Ensemble in a Comedy Series (shared with the cast)	Orange is the New Black (season one)	Won	
Screen Actors Guild Awards	2016	Outstanding Ensemble in a Comedy Series (shared with the cast)	Orange is the New Black (season three)	Won	
Screen Actors Guild Awards	2017	Outstanding Ensemble in a Comedy Series (shared with the cast)	Orange is the New Black (season four)	Nominated	
Teen Choice Awards	1999	Film – Funniest Scene (shared with Marisa Tomei)	Slums of Beverly Hills	Nominated	
Teen Choice Awards	1999	Film – Breakout Performance	Slums of Beverly Hills	Nominated	
Television Critics Association	2019	Individual Achievement in Comedy	Russian Doll	Nominated	
Television Critics Association	2019	Outstanding Achievement in Comedy	Russian Doll	Nominated	
Television Critics Association	2019	Outstanding New Program	Russian Doll	Won	
Television Critics Association	2019	Program of the Year	Russian Doll	Nominated	
Television Critics Association	2023	Program of the Year	Poker Face	Nominated	
Television Critics Association	2023	Outstanding Achievement in Comedy	Poker Face	Nominated	
Television Critics Association	2023	Individual Achievement in Comedy	Poker Face	Won	
Television Critics Association	2023	Outstanding New Program	Poker Face	Nominated	
Writers Guild of America Awards	2020	Comedy Series	Russian Doll	Nominated	
Writers Guild of America Awards	2020	New Series	Russian Doll	Nominated	
Young Hollywood Awards	2000	Best Ensemble Cast (shared with the cast)	American Pie	Won	

== See also ==
- The song "Natasha" from Want One (2003) by Rufus Wainwright was written for and about Lyonne.
