= Love, Loss, and What I Wore =

2008 play by Nora and Delia Ephron

- United States national tour artwork
- Original language: English
- Written by: Nora and Delia Ephron (playwrights); Ilene Beckerman (material)
- Characters: 5 women
- Genre: Monologues

Premiere
- Date: August 2, 2008
- Place: Bridgehampton Community House
- Official website

Love, Loss, and What I Wore is a play written by Nora and Delia Ephron based on the 1995 book of the same name by Ilene Beckerman. It is organized as a series of monologues and uses a rotating cast of five principal women. The subject matter of the monologues includes women's relationships and wardrobes and at times the interaction of the two, using the female wardrobe as a time capsule of a woman's life.

The show was initially presented as a part of the 2008 summer series at Guild Hall in East Hampton, New York, and then as a benefit series at the DR2 Theatre in New York in early 2009. Later the same year, the show was produced Off-Broadway as an ongoing commercial theatrical production at the Westside Theatre in New York, where it became the second-longest running show in the theatre's history. The production and its cast received positive critical attention. The production won the 2010 Drama Desk Award for Unique Theatrical Experience as well as the 2010 Broadway.com Audience Award for Favorite New Off-Broadway Play.

The show has been produced on six continents and more than eight countries. It began a national tour in the United States in September 2011 in Chicago. It played an encore performance in Paris in January 2012.

== Background and development ==
Nora Ephron was a writer, director and producer best known for writing the screenplays of romantic comedy films. She received three Academy Award nominations for Original Screenplay, for Silkwood (1983), When Harry Met Sally... (1989) and Sleepless in Seattle (1993).

She wrote five best-selling books and the 2002 play Imaginary Friends, which fictionalized the antagonistic relationship between Lillian Hellman and Mary McCarthy. Ephron sometimes co-authored screenplays with her sister, writer-producer Delia Ephron, including You've Got Mail (1998), Hanging Up (2000), and Bewitched (2005).

Nora Ephron wrote the introduction to Beckerman's eponymous 1995 book, which she immediately thought had dramatic possibilities. She identified with the stories in Love, Loss, and What I Wore because the book "is not about fashion; it is about what clothes really are to us, those moments when we are constantly trying to find our identity through them." Soon after its publication, Ephron gave the book to eight of her friends for Christmas. She became interested in writing her own version of the book. Once she decided to adapt Love, Loss, and What I Wore into a play, she and her sister emailed 100 women for stories.

The show's monologues were sourced largely from Beckerman's book. The Ephrons wove together a collection of stories adapted from the book with recollections of friends, including Rosie O'Donnell. One of the monologues that became a highlight of the original production was based on Nora Ephron's 2006 best-seller, I Feel Bad About My Neck.

== Plot ==
A character called "Gingy" acts as the narrator. The show opens with her sketching various parts of her wardrobe that stir the most poignant memories. She weaves her life story among the other tales, describing her three marriages, "motherhood and the death of a child, each turning point marked by a particular item of clothing." Her life is represented beginning with experiences in a Brownies uniform and extending through her full life. Another character serves as the vixen, another plays a vulnerable gang member from Chicago, a third portrays a brave cancer patient, and the last serves as a mature woman pierced by vivid memories. One character named Heather chooses conservative "think" shoes over high heels in her youth, but at a later stage in life shows a preference for high heels. A gang member likes insignias that are prominent on sweaters and their creator.

Among the 28 stories, other notable tales revolve around the influence of Madonna ("any American woman under 40 who says she's never dressed as Madonna is either lying or Amish"), dressing room anxiety ("I'm an 8. I've always been an 8"), and mothers' taste in clothes ("I don't understand, you could look so good if you tried"). Three of the characters sometimes work as a trio and all characters have monologues.

The Los Angeles Times spent a full paragraph on a vignette about two high school prom dresses. The junior prom dress was a conservative powder blue gown to wear with a nerdy date. The senior prom dress was a sexy black mini dress that was befitting of her more desirable date. The dresses presented an identity crisis to one character: "Here's the thing – I've never really known for sure which of those two people I am – the girl who almost doesn't get asked to the prom at all or the girl who gets to go with the really cute guy. Every time I thought I knew which one I was, I turned out to be the other. Which is one reason I think I got married, to, like, end the confusion."

The New York Times presented three stories that it felt were particularly emotional: the first about a woman who removed miniskirts from her college wardrobe after being raped, but continued wearing her favorite boots; another about wedding attire anxieties; and the third about the choice of adorning a newly reconstructed breast with a tattoo. The same article also noted a humorous ode to black as a part of a wardrobe or in fact as a wardrobe, as one character notes: "Sometimes I buy something that isn't black, and I put it on and I am so sorry."

Other stories include recollections about the dress purchased for the date with a guy who subsequently married someone else; the foibles of spandex bras that result in a look known as the monoboob; issues involving toe cleavage; the Juicy Couture tracksuit that is a prominent staple of California wardrobes; wardrobe choice on the wrong day of the month; and the story about an incarcerated lover and the strategic hole in a certain pair of pants.

== Production history ==
=== Initial benefit productions ===
Love, Loss, and What I Wore was first presented on August 2, 2008 at the Bridgehampton Community House as a benefit for the renovation of the John Drew Theatre/Guild Hall in East Hampton, New York. The production, directed by Karen Lynn Carpenter, starred Linda Lavin, Karyn Quackenbush, Leslie Kritzer, Kathy Najimy, and Sara Chase. Then Daryl Roth produced the play in a Monday night series of benefit performances for 'Dress for Success', a charity organization that serves low-income women by enabling them to afford work clothing and providing job support, again under the direction of Karen Lynn Carpenter. The set of seven Monday night readings were presented from February 2 through March 9, 2009 at the Off-off-Broadway DR2 Theatre. The first seven performances had seven different casts. The first cast at DR2 Theatre was Marian Seldes, Joy Behar, Katie Finneran, Heather Burns and Lucy DeVito. Other participants in the original readings included Tyne Daly (who created the narrator character, Gingy, for the New York Production), Rosie O'Donnell, Samantha Bee, Rondi Reed, America Ferrera, Debi Mazar, Marlo Thomas, Blythe Danner, Christine Lahti, Parker Posey, Julie White, Kelly Bishop, Sarah Jones, Veanne Cox and Kristen Wiig.

=== Off-Broadway ===
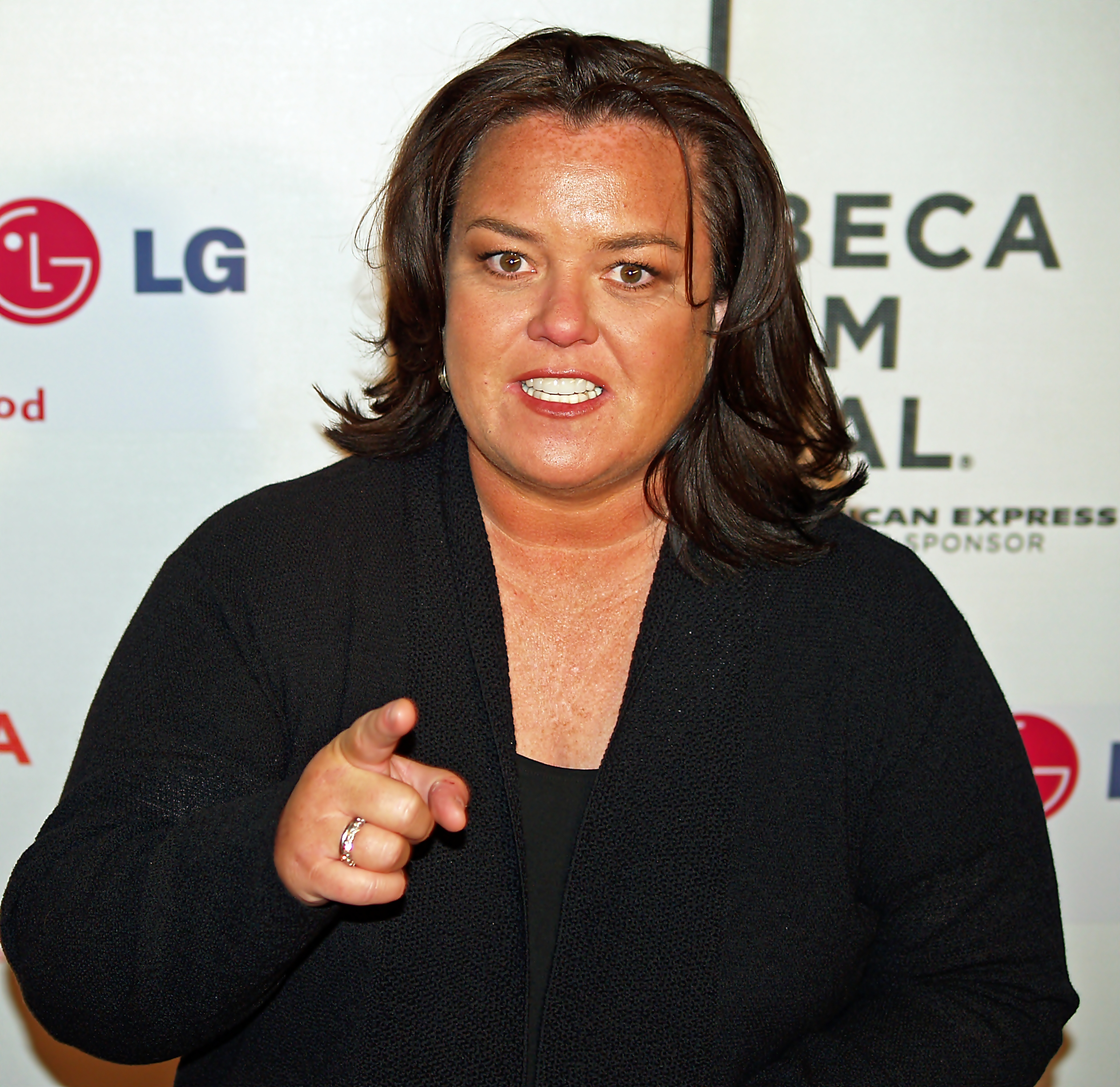
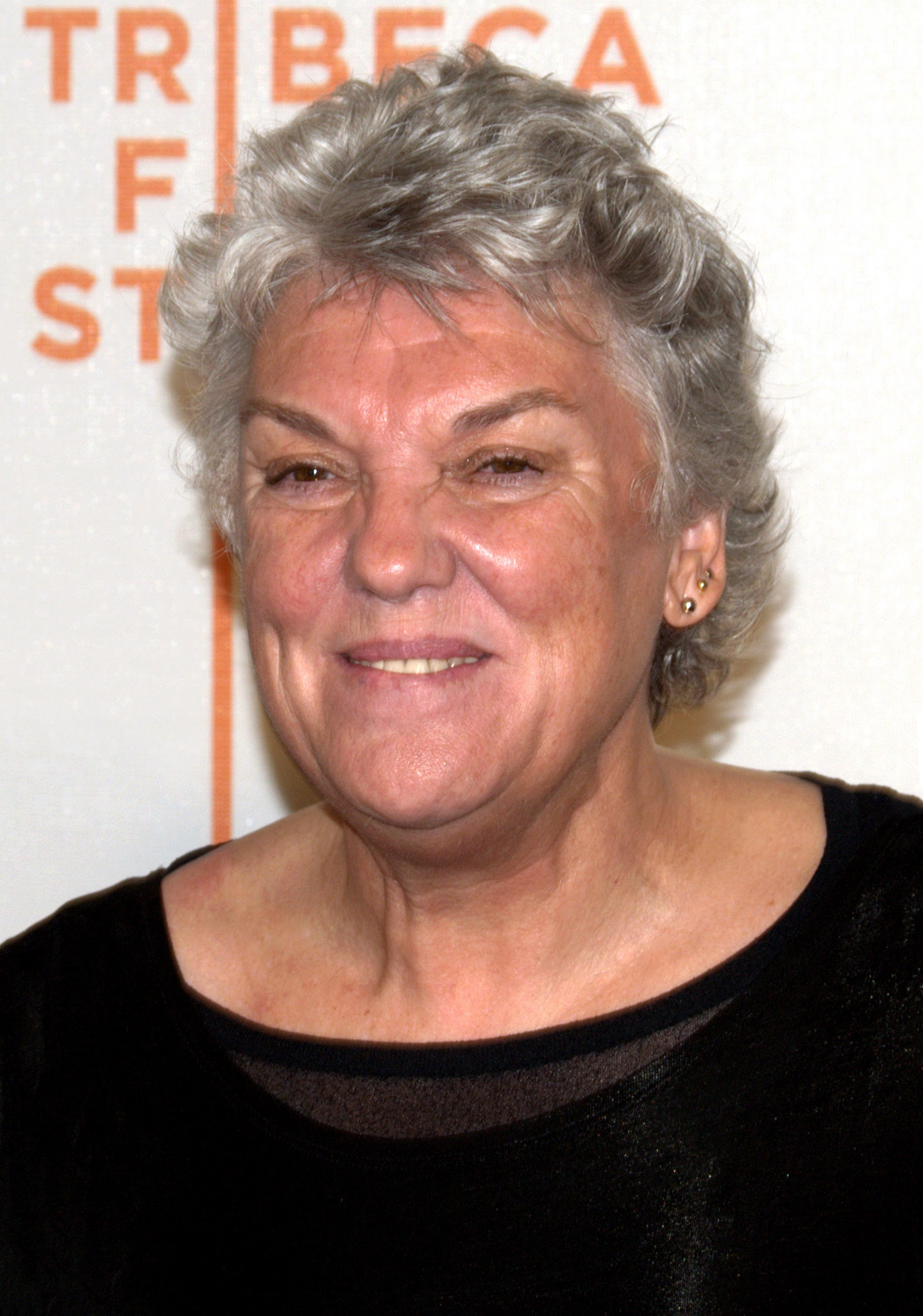
Rosie O'Donnell (left in 2008) and Tyne Daly (right in 2009) were nominated for 2010 Drama League Awards for Distinguished Performance

The play was then performed Off-Broadway, beginning on September 21, 2009, with 3 consecutive runs each lasting 4 weeks and having an entirely new 5-person cast.

The production officially opened on October 1, 2009 at the Westside Theatre. The cast originally included Daly, O'Donnell, Bee, Katie Finneran and Natasha Lyonne. The rotating cast also included Mary Birdsong, Kristin Chenoweth, Lucy DeVito, Jane Lynch, Rhea Perlman, Mary Louise Wilson and Rita Wilson. Chenoweth was replaced in the last of the initial three 4-week runs by Finneran. The production benefited 'Dress for Success'. Karen Lynn Carpenter directed, with scenic design by Jo Winiarski, costume design by Jessica Jahn, lighting design by Jeff Croiter, sound design by Walter Trarbach and make-up design by Maria Verel. Daryl Roth was the producer and Alexander Fraser was the co-producer. The production was staged with the five women seated, all dressed in black, at the lip of the stage, consulting scripts on music stands as needed. Ilene Beckerman's original drawings were presented on placards, hung on clothes hangers on a clothes rack, stage right of the Gingy actress.

The production continued at the Westside Theatre with an open-ended commercial run with the casting strategy of rotating 4-week casts because it enabled the production to pursue higher-caliber actors. Nora Ephron stated at one question and answer session: "We keep re-casting it so we can get really great actresses to come for four weeks. It is really hard to get really good people to work Off-Broadway for six months because it does not pay much, but you can get them for four weeks." Other well-known actresses who have performed in the Off-Broadway production include the following: Carol Kane, Debra Monk, Janeane Garofalo, Fran Drescher, Melissa Joan Hart, Brooke Shields, Victoria Clark, Alison Fraser, Tovah Feldshuh, Loretta Swit, Mary Testa, Nikki Blonsky, Donna McKechnie, B. Smith and Marla Maples. As of October 2011, it was the second-longest running show in the history of Westside Theatre.

The show won the 2010 Drama Desk Award for Unique Theatrical Experience as well as the 2010 Broadway.com Audience Award for Favorite New Off-Broadway Play. Daly and O'Donnell were nominated for 2010 Drama League Awards for Distinguished Performance. Tara Rubin, Merri Sugarman, Eric Woodall, and Lauran Schtuzel were nominated for the 2010 Casting Society of America Artios Awards for NY Off-Broadway Comedy/Musical Excellence in Casting.

The show's 1,000th performance played on March 15, 2012. The production closed on March 25, 2012 after 1,013 performances. Thirty-two rotating casts and 120 actresses participated in the production over its entire run. The final cast was Sierra Boggess, Joyce Van Patten, Karyn Quackenbush, Erica Watson and Ally Walker.

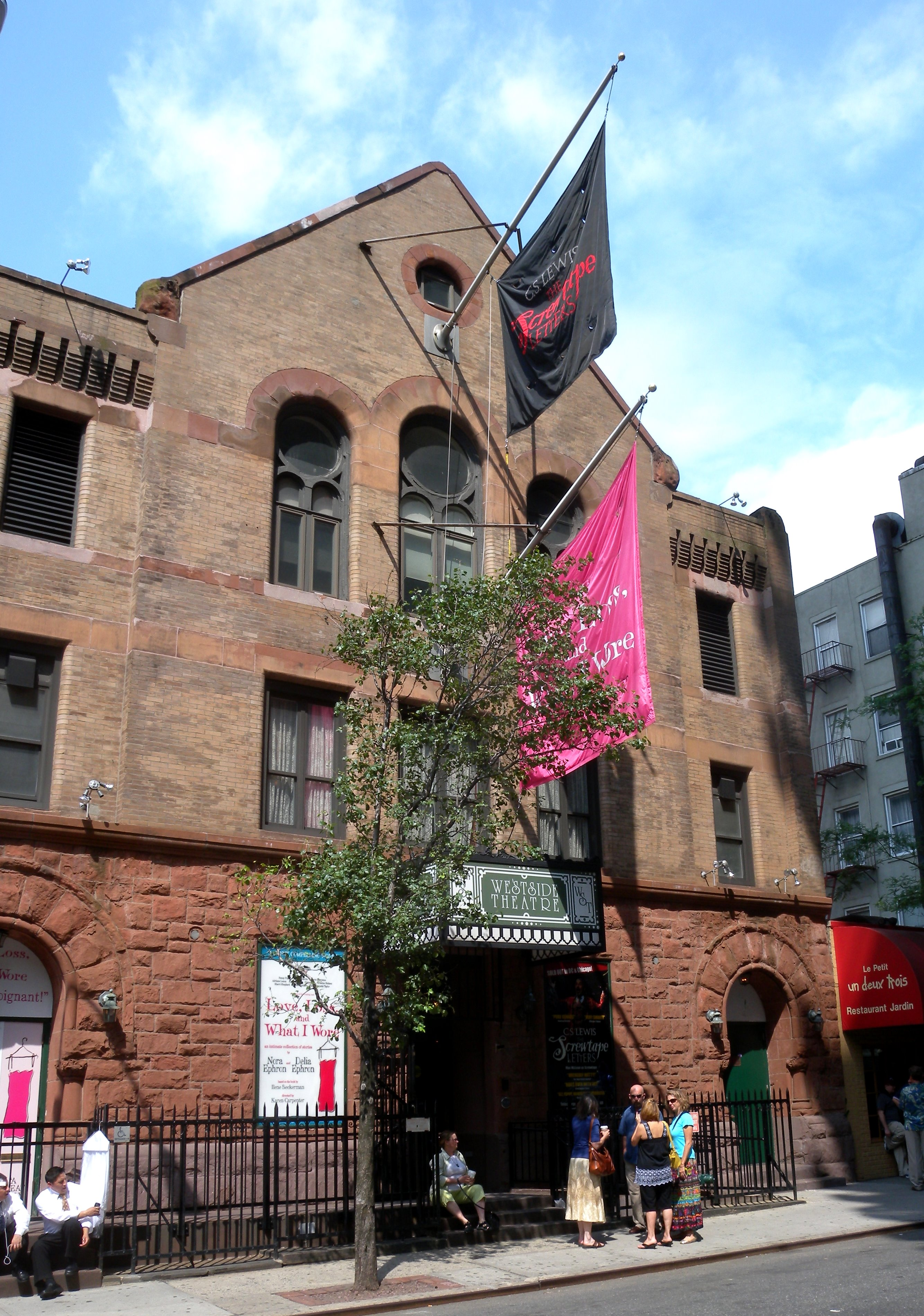
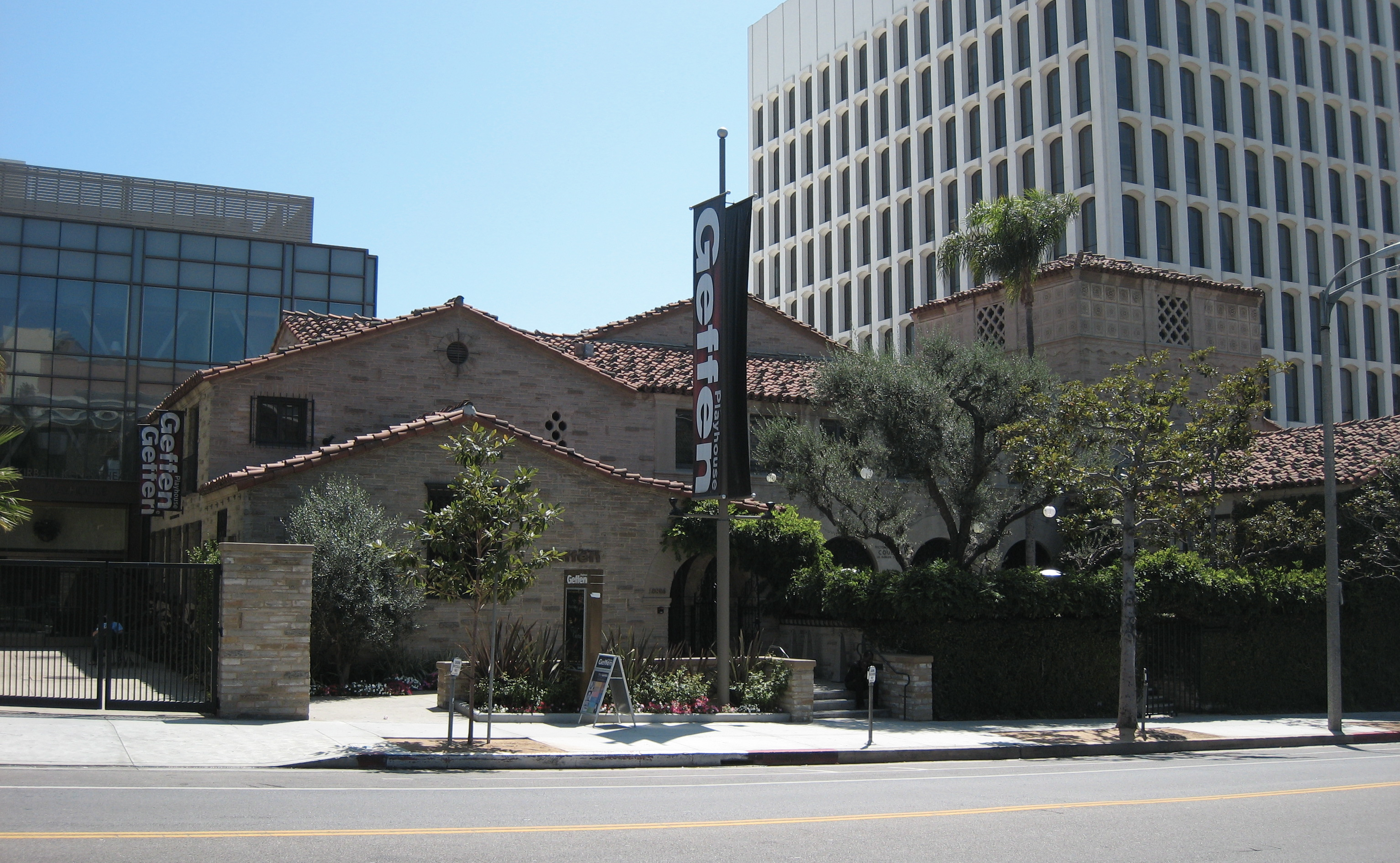
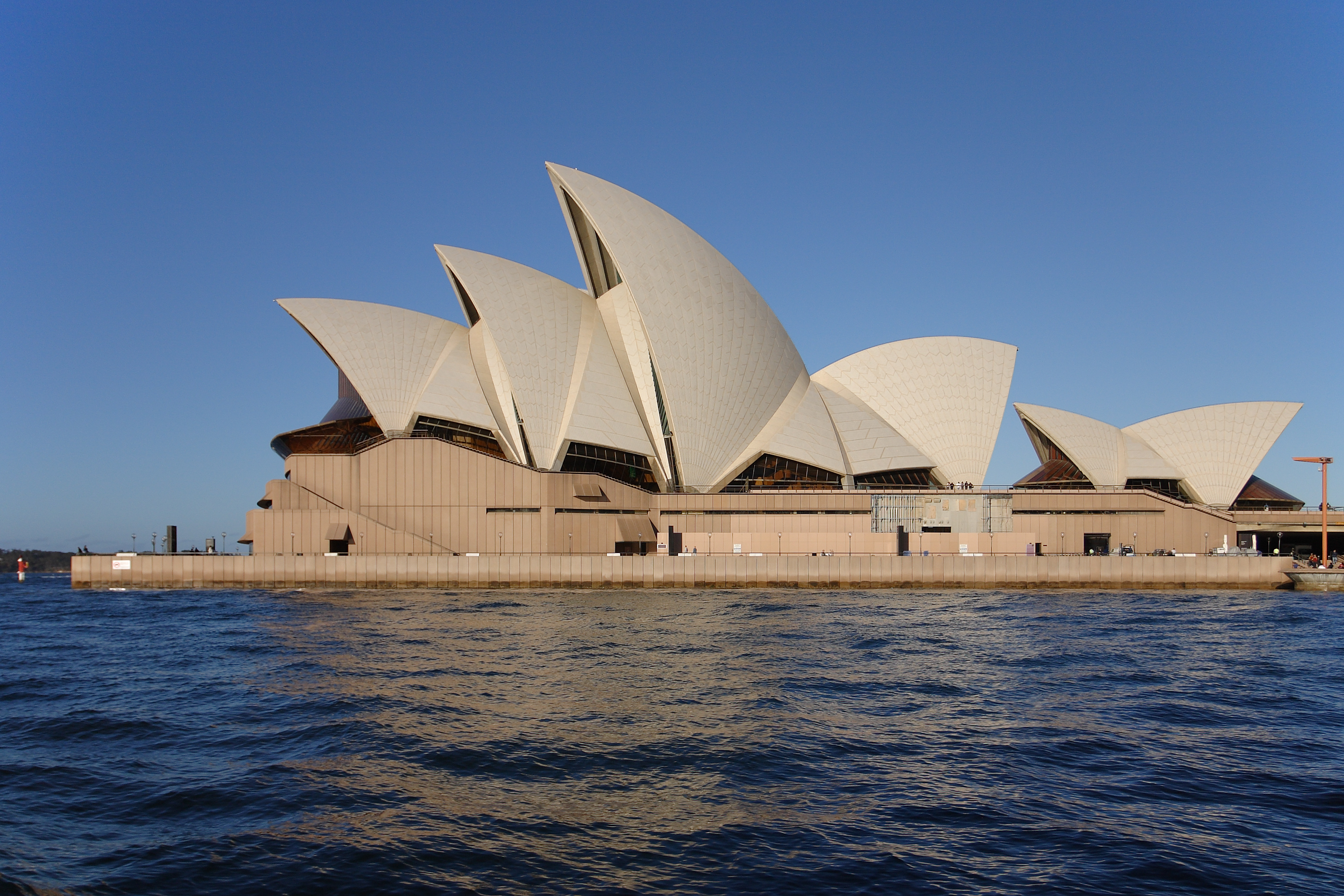
The production officially opened on October 1, 2009 at the Westside Theatre (top); Later productions of the show included runs at the Geffen Playhouse (middle) and the Sydney Opera House (bottom)

=== US National Tour ===
Carpenter directed a US national tour that began in Chicago in September 2011 with an engagement at the Broadway Playhouse at Water Tower Place.

Roth produced the Chicago production. The Chicago cast included Nora Dunn, Felicia Fields, Roni Geva, Katie O'Brien and Barbara Robertson as Gingy. Although the show was originally scheduled to run through October 23, 2011, it was extended to December 4 before opening and later extended again to January 1, 2012. The post-Chicago national tour performances were set to be headlined by the December 7–30 Off-Broadway cast that included Daisy Eagan, Sonia Manzano and Loretta Swit.

=== Other productions ===
The play was next produced at the Geffen Playhouse in Los Angeles. The Geffen production ran from May 12 through November 19, 2010, breaking box office records. The Geffen casts also rotated.

Actresses there included Daly, Kane, DeVito, Perlman, Nancy Travis, Bonnie Franklin, Meredith Baxter, Florence Henderson, Marissa Jaret Winokur, María Conchita Alonso, Christine Lahti, Jenny O'Hara, Lauren Hutton, Harriet Harris, Teri Garr, Mimi Rogers and Sally Struthers. Most of the initial Geffen cast had performed in the Off-Broadway run. At the Geffen Playhouse, the show was directed by Jenny Sullivan. Kane played "Gingy" when it debuted in Los Angeles.

By the end of 2010, the play had been staged in New York, Los Angeles, Toronto and Buenos Aires, and numerous other productions around the world have run since then. Carpenter directed the international production that has run in many countries. The Toronto production ran from July 16 to October 2, 2010 at the Panasonic Theater. The play was presented in Sydney from January 3 through January 30, 2011 at the Sydney Opera House with an opening cast of Natalie Bassingthwaighte, Judi Farr, Amanda Muggleton, Magda Szubanski and Mirrah Foulkes, under the direction of Wayne Harrison, with some minor modifications to localize some of the Americanisms. In South Africa, the show was performed from April 8 through June 12, 2011 at Studio Theatre, Montecasino near Johannesburg and at the Theatre on the Bay in Cape Town from June 15 through July 2 under the direction of Moira Blumenthal. It made its Asian premiere in Manila from July 14 through July 17, 2011 at RCBC Plaza with a cast that included Bituin Escalante; the production was directed by Michael Williams and Azanza-Dy.

== Themes ==
The show, with a running time of about 90 minutes, consists of 28 different stories that seek to illuminate the female identity. Generally consisting of humorous incidents, the show often addresses sad, bitter or sentimental issues. Beckerman's memoir takes as its departure the clothing worn at pivotal times of her life and serves as the play's. The Ephrons augmented this with a collection of similarly themed stories presented by four additional characters.

The show is staged in an "unapologetically low-tech" manner, using clothing as a metaphor for women's experiences. In addition to clothing, accessories such as a purse are important, and Charles Isherwood of The New York Times noted that when Nora Ephron viewed a purse: "In the chaos of its interior she sees a symbol of herself, as in a dark mirror smudged with old lipstick and smelling of spilled perfume." The show consists of five women's monologues about wardrobe malfunctions, puberty's relationship with personal wardrobe, first date outfits, lucky underwear, prom dresses, favorite boots, irreplaceable shirts, the detested, disorganized purse, and experiences in the dressing room. The recollections about the clothing prompt the women's memories about their mothers, boyfriends, husbands, ex-husbands, sisters and grandchildren.

== Critical reaction ==
Broadway.com described the original benefit series as "intimate and starry". New York Times reviewer Isherwood described the Off-Broadway play as a "show about matters of the heart and matters of the closet". In Variety, Marilyn Stasio called it "a bittersweet meditation on the joys and tribulations of women's lives, reflected through the prism of their clothes." In Bloomberg News, the critics commented that the playwrights were "literary alchemists expert at mixing the sentimental and the satirical and turning out something poignant" and noted that the clothing and accessories dominated the memories while the "men are extras." The Los Angeles Times described the show as a cross between The Vagina Monologues and What Not to Wear. Helen Shaw, writing for Time Out, also described the Ephrons' style as similar to The Vagina Monologues' Eve Ensler. Jay Reiner of The Hollywood Reporter noted that from the work "a tapestry of the collective female psyche emerges that is tender and insightful without being sentimental."

A highlight from Ephron's book that was consistently praised was O'Donnell's portrayal the purse in the scene "I Hate My Purse!". While Reiner said, "There's an amusing 'I hate my purse' segment," Isherwood noted that the "smartest and shapeliest piece of writing in the show is that acerbic essay by Nora Ephron about her troublesome relationship with purses... Entrusted to Ms. O'Donnell, who does it proud, the essay is a defiant denunciation of the tyranny of the pocketbook, a 'j'accuse' for the era of the 'it' bag." Shaw described O'Donnell's purse performance as an aria, and Jerry Tallmer of The Villager called it "one of the pillars of the show." This scene is sometimes performed alone outside of the theater.

Isherwood has noted that this serves a female audience. "If there are chick flicks and chick lit – derogatory though some might find those terms to be – Love, Loss, and What I Wore should clearly be classified as chick legit... for the women who can share deeply in the particulars of experience dissected and discussed." The Los Angeles Times notes the light nature of the subject matter: "... isn't out to reclaim female sexuality from centuries of oppression; it wittily celebrates wardrobe malfunctions..." According to Reiner, the show points out that "... if there is one thing the females of the species have in common, it's a deep and abiding love/hate relationship with their wardrobe... this wonderfully witty show illustrates, what one wears to the party is sometimes more memorable than the party itself." He also notes that the entire performance has meaning as it is "jam-packed and resonant" throughout. Shaw notes that "The cozy humor strikes many women's funnybones with a mighty whack, perhaps because it reaffirms so perfectly their own preoccupations."

Certain monologues on subjects such as weight, status bags and high heels did not achieve their full potential according to The Los Angeles Times reviewer. Time Out magazine described certain lines as oversalted, but forgivably so.

=== Major awards and nominations ===
Off-Broadway and Los Angeles production artwork

The original Off-Broadway production earned several recognitions:

Award	Outcome
2010 Drama Desk Awards
Unique Theatrical Experience	Won
2010 Drama League Awards
Distinguished Performance: Tyne Daly	Nominated
Distinguished Performance: Rosie O'Donnell	Nominated

At the November 2009 Casting Society of America Artios Awards, the Ephrons earned the New York Big Apple Award.
