= Unsettled Land =

- Film poster
- Directed by: Uri Barbash
- Screenplay by: Benny Barwash; Eran Preis
- Produced by: Ludi Boeken; Katriel Schori; Ben Elkerbout
- Starring: Kelly McGillis; John Shea; Christine Boisson
- Cinematography: Amnon Salomon
- Edited by: Tova Asher
- Music by: Misha Segal
- Production company: Belbo Films
- Distributed by: GSO (France); Hemdale Film (US); J. L. Bowbank (Canada)
- Release dates: September 26, 1987 (Tokyo International Film Festival); January 13, 1989 (US); January 30, 1990 (France)
- Running time: 109 minutes
- Countries: Israel; Netherlands
- Languages: Hebrew; English
- Budget: $2,000,000

Unsettled Land (Hebrew: החולמים, lit. The Dreamers; also known as Once We Were Dreamers) is a 1987 Israeli drama directed by Uri Barbash.

The plot follows a group of young Jewish individuals who leave Europe immediately after World War I and the pogroms that followed to fulfill a dream and start a new chapter in their lives and in the lives of their people. The group consists of individualists driven by faith, dreaming of a utopian society free from religious constraints and striving for complete equality. Upon arriving in the land of their ancestors, they discover that the land is not empty, and they must fight to survive, abandoning the rigid laws of their utopia.

The film premiered in the International Competition at the Tokyo International Film Festival and was selected to be shown at the Israel Film Festival in New York. It also won awards for Best Cinematography (Amnon Salomon) and Best Art Direction (Eitan Levy) at the Israel Film Center.

== Plot ==
In 1919, a group of idealistic Jewish pioneers from Europe, including Austrian doctor Anda (Kelly McGillis) and her Russian violinist lover Marcus (John Shea) who was a former yeshiva student and became a fervent Labor Zionist after the murder of his family in a pogrom, arrive in Palestine and attempt to establish a kibbutz in the Galilee. Their dream ends up shattered as they attempt to cope with the hardships of the land, sexual and ideological tensions within the group, and hostile confrontations with their Arab neighbours. Finally, the film dramatizes their disappointment as they must come to terms with the gaps between their utopian vision and reality.

As Miri Talmon has noted, the film "makes a clear intergenerational connection between the ‘pioneers’ and the shattering of the dream, which is the experience that the audience and the individual filmgoer faced at the end of the eighties.”

== Cast ==
- Kelly McGillis as Anda
- John Shea as Marcus
- Christine Boisson as Sima
- Arnon Zadok as Amnon
- Robert Pollock as Yulek
- Sinai Peter as Daniel
- Neta Moran as Temma
- Amos Lavi as Muhammed
- Boris Rimmer as Avrum
- Alan Bergreen as Natan
- Martha Arden as Rosa
- Rachel Amran as Maha
- Avi Gouetta as Salim Assistant 2
- Yossi Ashdot as Shepard

== Critical reception ==
Despite its rather large budget and Hollywood stars, the film did poorly at the box office and garnered poor reviews.
