= Uri Barbash =

Israeli film director

- אורי ברבש
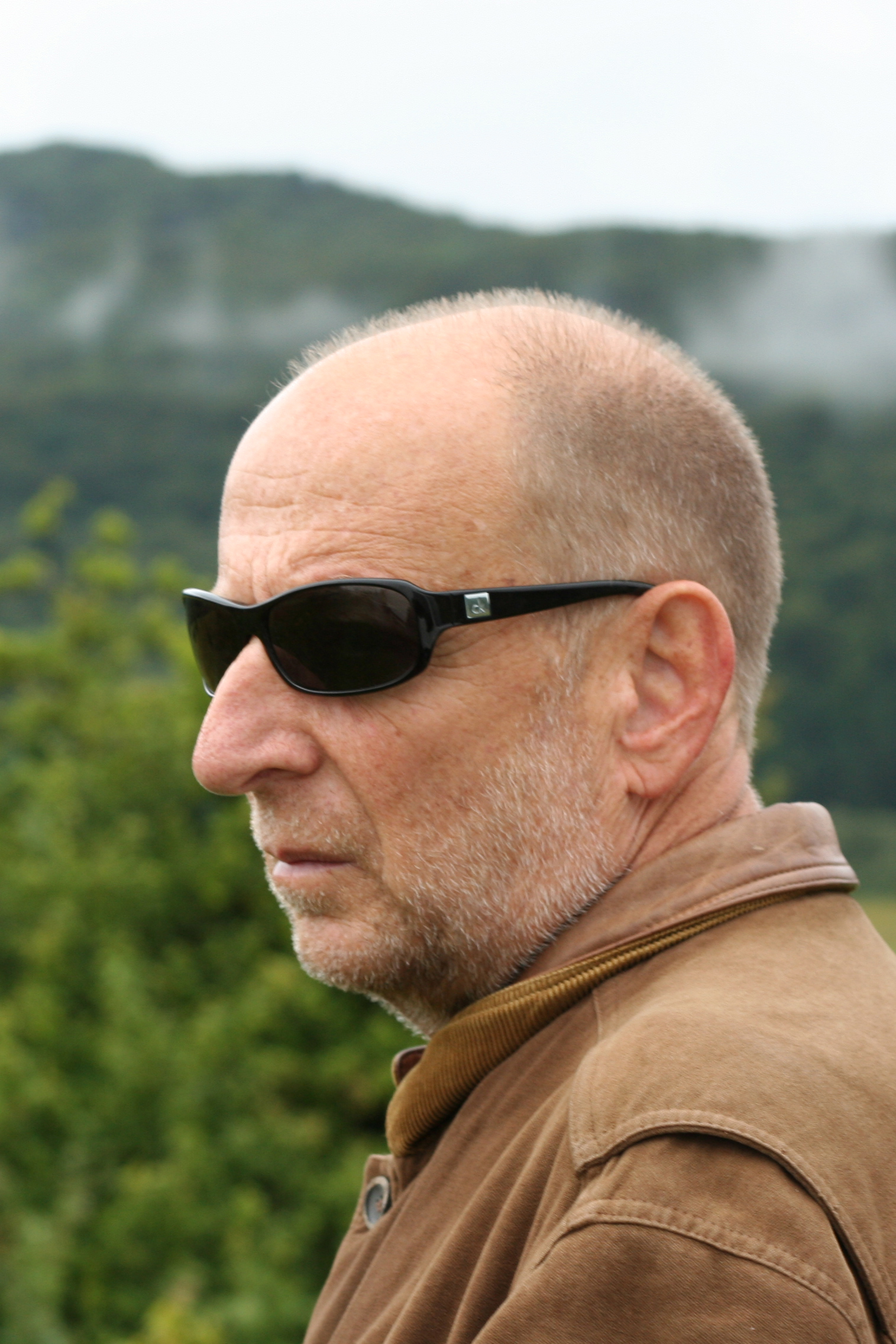
- Born: 24 December 1946 (age 79); Tel Aviv, Mandatory Palestine
- Occupation: Film director
- Years active: 1982-present

Uri Barbash (Hebrew: אורי ברבש; born 24 December 1946) is an Israeli film director and television director, and a member of the Academy of Motion Pictures Arts and Sciences and the Israeli Academy of Film and Television. His film Beyond the Walls (1984) was nominated for an Academy Award for Best International Feature Film.

== Biography ==
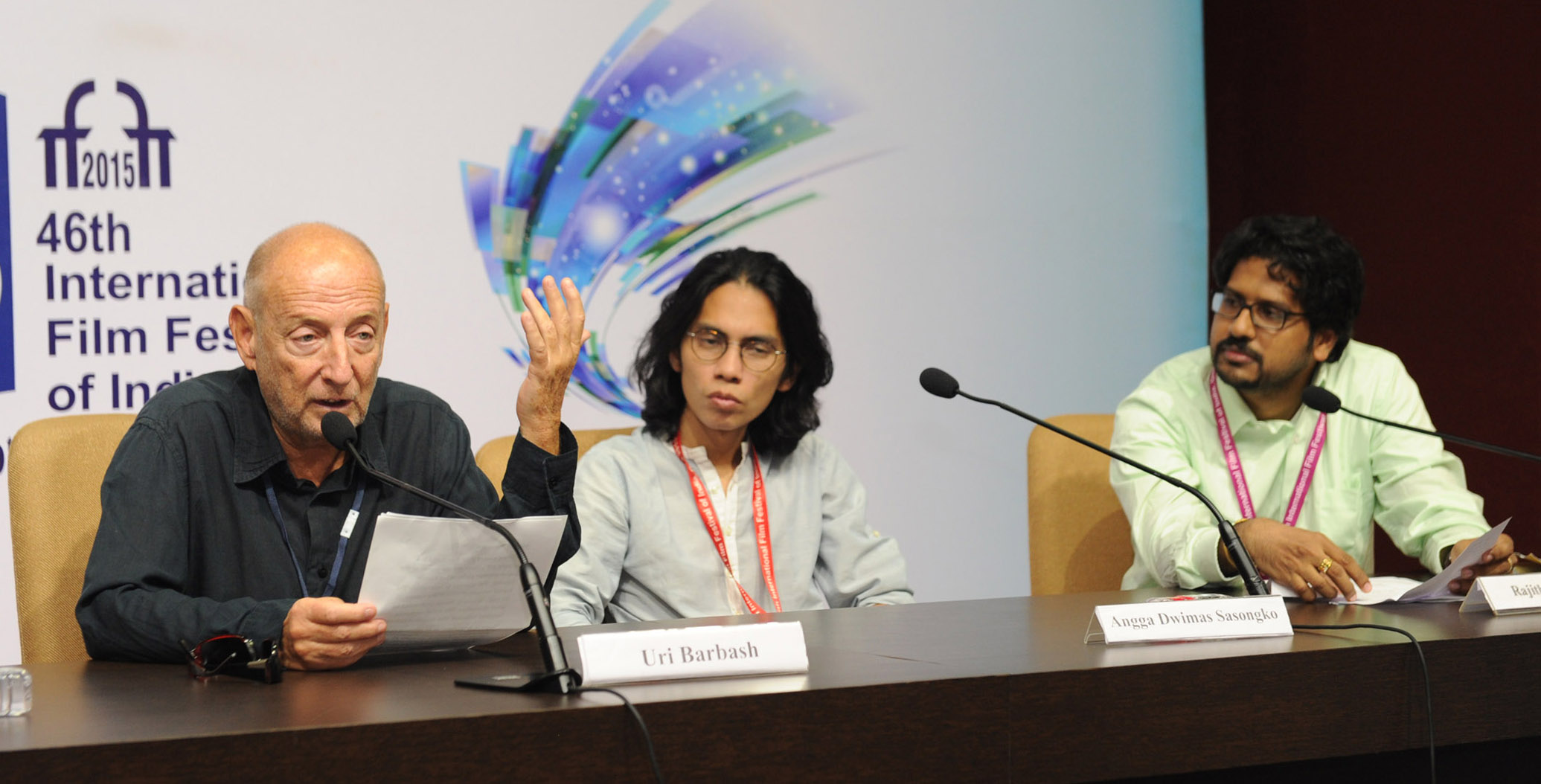
Barbash (left), at IFFI (2015)

Barbash, a descendant of the Schneerson family, is the eldest son of Ruth (née Haber) and Menachem Barbash. He was born in Tel Aviv, but at the age of two the family moved to Be'er Sheva, where he grew up. His father, Menachem, was a member of the Shai unit and later a member of the public service. His mother was a teacher, school principal, and teacher trainer. In his youth, he lived in Argentina for two years, following his father's missions. He attended Tichon Hadash high school in Tel Aviv. In the IDF, Barbash initially served in Nahal and then volunteered for Sayeret Shaked[3]. In Sayeret, Barbash underwent a training course as a warrior, as well as an infantry company commander course and a reconnaissance course. Upon completion of the course, he participated in training and operational activities within the Sayeret in the Southern Command. As a reservist, he fought in the Yom Kippur War and the First Lebanon War. Barbash has a brother, Benny Barbash, a writer and screenwriter with whom he collaborates on his work, and a sister, Hani.

Barbash is a graduate of the London Film School.

Between 1975 and 1982, he directed dozens of documentaries and television dramas. The following documentaries are well-known from this period:

- "This is not paradise and we are not angels" (1976) – the story of a kibbutz dealing with a changing reality. "A Weekday" (1976) – following the beginning of the career of singer Ahuva Ozeri.
- "Shoshana's Children" (1977) – the story of a foster family taking care of ten children.
- "Heaven" (1977) – the story of the rock band Gan Eden (Heaven).

Among his dramas, one considered outstanding is "Seal for Life" (1979) by Eran Preis and Uri Barbash, which won the Kinor David Prize. Starring Arnon Zadok and Ofra Weingarten, it deals with a prisoner who is released from prison and tries to rebuild his life and his family.

In 1982, he directed and wrote his first feature film, "Ot Cain," by Eran Preis, a drama film that follows the adventures of a man who is released from a mental hospital and discovers that his family has abandoned him, starring Delik Wolinitz and Arnon Zadok. The film also won the David Violin Award. That same year, he directed "Gabi Ben Yakar," by Eran Price, starring Moshe Ivgy and Albert Iloz, which follows a young man who is having difficulty coping with his military service.

In 1984, he collaborated for the first time with his brother, Benny Barbash. Benny wrote the screenplay for his film "Beyond the Walls" with Eran Preise, which follows the united struggle of Jewish and Arab prisoners against the prison administration in which they are held. The film stars Assi Dayan, Arnon Zadok, and Muhammad Bakri. The collaboration was very successful and the film won six Israeli Academy Awards that year, including Best Picture and Best Director. The film was also nominated for an Oscar for Best Foreign Language Film, and Barbash won the FIPRESCI Prize from the International Federation of Film Critics at the Venice Film Festival for his work. It was the first Israeli film to be distributed outside of Israel by Warner Bros.

Due to the film's success, the brothers began working together regularly. In 1987, they directed "Unsettled Land," (written with Eran Preis), another film about Jewish-Arab relations, which follows the struggle of Jewish immigrants from Europe and their relations with Israeli Arabs, starring Amos Lavi and Kelly McGillis. In 1989, they collaborated for the third time on the film "One of Us," which follows the actions of a military policeman sent to investigate his former comrades in an elite paratroop unit charged with the murder of an Arab who killed a member of the unit., starring Alon Abutboul, Dalia Shimko, Sharon Alexander and Dan Toren. The film won four Israeli film awards - including the Best Film Award and the Best Director Award.

In December 1989, Barbash was named the director of the decade in Israeli cinema in a poll conducted by the Israel Film Institute and Yedioth Ahronoth newspaper.

In 1990, Barbash created "The Eagle's Path", again with his brother Benny, who wrote the script with Assi Dayan. The film follows the final moments of a man suffering from a malignant disease, starring Eli Danker, Gidi Gov and Nurit Galron. In 1991, he directed "Real Time", which Benny wrote, which tells the story of a former lieutenant colonel's soul-searching process during the Yom Kippur War, starring Assi Dayan. In 1992, the brothers collaborated once again, creating the sequel to "Beyond the Walls" ("Beyond the Walls 2"), which tells the story of the prison inmates, but the film failed at the box office and was critically acclaimed. That same year, they created "Lick the Strawberry", starring Aki Avni and Uri Banai.

In 1994, Barbash directed the television series "The Kastner Trial" (which dealt with the Kastner trial), written by Motti Lerner, which won the Television Academy Award at the end of that year. The series starred Sasson Gabai, Yona Elian, and Yitzhak Hizkia. That same year, he also directed the film "Power of Attorney," starring Yoram Hatev, about Dov Gruner - an Irgun fighter who was executed by the British. In 1995, he directed the television series "Seaton," starring Sasson Gabay, which follows a lawyer who has difficulty managing his personal life. In 1997, he directed the series "Route 300," written by Motti Lerner, which followed the historical affair known as the Route 300 affair or "the Shin Bet affair."

In 1998, the Barbash brothers began creating television series' for Channel 2, with Benny writing the scripts and Uri directing. The first was "Tiruniot," which follows an IDF company during its basic training period, starring Aki Avni. The series was very successful, lasting three full seasons and winning two Golden Screen Awards, until it ended in 2000. In 2001, he directed the television series "The Institute," the story of a group of psychologists who try to rehabilitate the patients mental state in an unusual way. That same year, the brothers created the television series "My First Sonny," which follows a troubled Israeli family, starring Yoram Hatev, Dafna Rechter, and Ran Bechor. The series won the award for best drama series at the Jerusalem Film Festival at the end of that year.

In 2004, he wrote and directed a two-part film called "With a Clear Conscience," which follows the story of conscientious objectors in Israel. The film's screening on Channel One was accompanied by difficulties and caused a public uproar, even though the film was made at the request of the Israel Broadcasting Authority.[8] The second part of the film has not been broadcast to this day, according to film critics due to censorship.[9][10]

During 2005 and 2006, he directed the television series "Milouim" (Reserves), also based on a script by Benny Barbash, starring Igal Naor and Maya Maron. At the same time, in 2005, he created the television drama "Diana's Child". In 2006, he directed, again based on a script by his brother, the film "Salt of the Earth", starring Lior Ashkenazi, Aki Avni and Nati Ravitz. In 2008, he directed the television series "Good Intentions", based on a script by Ronit Weiss Berkowitz, starring Clara Khoury, Orna Pitousi, Naomi Fromovich, Nati Ravitz and Tzachi Grad. The series is about a meeting between two women, a Palestinian and an Israeli, that changes their lives. In the same year, he also directed the drama series "The Naked Truth" which aired on Channel 10, starring Lior Ashkenazi, Evgenia Dodina, Yoram Hatev and Nati Ravitz. In 2010, the series format was sold to the American television network HBO and five European television networks.

In 2007–2008, he directed the film "Spring 41," written by Motti Lerner based on stories by Ida Fink. The film, starring Joseph Fiennes, tells a story of love and survival in a Polish village during the Holocaust and was the first film co-production made between Israel and Poland.

Barbash taught film at the Camera Obscura School and at Beit Zvi School and was a member of the teaching committee of the Sam Spiegel School in Jerusalem. In 2010, he served as an artistic advisor to the Israeli Film Foundation. In 2012, he created the documentary film "Be'er Halav in the Middle of a City" for Channel One. The film has two parts: "Private Authority" and "Public Authority." Each part is 90 minutes long. The film deals with the worlds of 14 young poets, and combines poetry readings and interviews. The film's title is taken from a poem by Hezi Leskly.

In October 2012, he won the Cinematic Arts Award from the Ministry of Culture and Sports. From the jury's reasoning: "A veteran film director in Israel, who has created in both the documentary and feature genres. His films excel in deep social sensitivity and a high level of professionalism in the various fields of cinematic art. Uri Barbash adds, renews, and refreshes his cinematic ways of expression."

In 2013, his documentary film "A Man's Prayer: The Story of Nola Chelton" was released. The film's heroiLne is a documentary theater creator, with an emphasis on bringing the voices of marginalized populations of society. Among her students: Dustin Hoffman, Sidney Lumet, Sandra Sade, Moni Moshonov, Shlomo Bar-Aba, Laura Rivlin.

In 2015, he directed the film "Kapo in Jerusalem", inspired by the story of Eliezer Greenbaum, who was a kapo in Auschwitz between 1942 and 1945.[15] The film was produced by Lerner, written by Moti Lerner, and filmed by Yoram Milo. The film stars, among others, Gil Frank, Mia Dagan, Icho Avital, Avraham Selector, Nati Ravitz, Dror Keren, Udi Percy, Arie Czerner, Tatiana Kanalis Ollier, Alex Carroll, and Amnon Wolf. The film was edited in early 2015. Lerner adapted the film into a play, which was translated into English by Roy Isakowitz.

At the 17th Jerusalem Jewish Film Festival, "Capo in Jerusalem" won the Schumann Prize with a special mention. The jury's reasoning was: "Capo in Jerusalem offers an intelligent, unique, and sensitive approach to the difficult subject of the Jewish Kapo in the extermination camps, and illuminates in an original and fascinating way a complex issue in Jewish history and Israeli consciousness."

In December 2015, Barbash won the Arik Einstein Award, given to veteran filmmakers by the Ministry of Culture and Sports. The jury's reasoning was: "A director who successfully combines a high professional level with intellectual and moral integrity for years. Uri Barbash's persistence and consistency have brought him and his films significant success in Israel and abroad, while he continues on his path, honing his methods of expression and spanning almost the entire spectrum of expression possible in cinema and television. Whether it is a full-length feature film, a television drama, or a documentary film or series, each of these works will contain Uri Barbash's signature and the conscientious values that guide him as a voice that he continues to hear and speak."

In August 2018, he won the Avner Shalev Award, the chairman of Yad Vashem, for a film dealing with Jewish heritage, at the Jerusalem Film Festival for the film "Black Honey: The Poetry of the Life of Abraham Sutzkever." From the judges' reasoning: "The importance of the film in revealing the figure of the Yiddish poet Abraham Sutzkever through cinematic means to the general public. Barbash succeeds in sketching the figure and poetry of Sutzkever, the greatest of the Yiddish poets of recent generations and a great poet on a global scale, while emphasizing the centrality of the Holocaust experience in his work, and his devotion to creating in Yiddish from an existential perspective, even in the State of Israel, in which he believed but did not receive the recognition he deserved".

In September of that year, he won the Landau Prize. The judges, Nir Bergman, Ronit Weiss-Berkowitz, and Tali Shemesh, stated: "One of our senior filmmakers. A prolific creator of feature films and documentaries, dramas, and television series that marked milestones in Israeli culture... In his films, he combines a virtuoso ability to tell a story with deep social sensitivity, courageously dealing with the 'other' and the forgotten, while continuing to consistently refresh and develop his cinematic style".

In 2020, he directed the television thriller "The Girl from Oslo", a co-production of Netflix, HOT, and Norwegian TV 2. The 10-episode series was originally titled "What Happened in Oslo" and deals with a reunion between Israeli, Palestinian, and Norwegian figures who took part in the talks surrounding the Oslo Accords. Alongside Barbash, the series was directed by Stian Kristiansen - Barbash filmed the main parts in Israel and Kristiansenn the parts filmed in Norway. The series was written by Ronit Weiss Berkowitz together with Kyrre Holm Johannessen and stars Amos Tamam, Anneke von der Lippe, Raida Adon, Rotem Abuhav, Daniel Litman, Andrea Berntzen, and Shira Yosef.

In 2022, he wrote and directed "Nitza's Choice" – a documentary drama produced by Kan 11 and Kastina Media. The film, which won the Best Documentary Film Award at the 38th Haifa International Film Festival, tells the story of a woman who, in her old age, is exposed to a trial that she was part of as a child, between a bereaved family that adopted her and her biological parents, who were Holocaust survivors. From the judges' reasoning: "[The film] brings to the screen an extraordinary human story, a modern Solomon trial [...] from Israel's painful past [...] a moving and touching character in her persistent search for her identity. Director Uri Barbash manages with great skill to weave the elements of the story into a gripping and moving documentary drama."[23][24][25] In 2023, the film was broadcast on Kan 11.

In 2023, as part of the protests against the legal reform, he created, together with the "White Shirts" organization - which represents the medical professions - the web series "The State of Israel Against the Health System".[27] The series consisted of 8 episodes, directed by Barbash, and co-written by Uri Barbash, his brother Benny Barbash, Itay Barkan and Orit Zafern. Later, together with teachers' and parents' organizations, he directed the network series "The State of Israel Against State Education". The series consisted of 5 episodes and starred Menashe Noy and Orit Zafern.[29][30][31][32][33] It is based on Yair Nahorai's book "The Third Revolution".

Later that year, he wrote and directed the film "Broken Time" for Kan 11, which deals with the connection between the 1973 failure and the 2023 failure. The film was first broadcast as part of the program "In Real Time" (Zman Emet), an investigative program, on December 5, 2023. The film follows soldiers from the Yom Kippur War in the year of the jubilee of the severe trauma in their lives. 50 years later, they first struggle against the 2023 legal reform, and after the October 7 attack, they mobilize to provide civilian assistance.

== Main themes ==
The IDF and the Israeli-Arab conflict are central themes in Barbash's work. They are the main themes of "Behind Bars", "Unsettled Land", "One of Our Own", "Real Time", "Behind Bars 2", "Lick the Strawberry", "Salt of the Earth", "Line 300", "Training", "With a Clear Conscience", "Reserves", "Good Intentions", "Travel Warning" and "Broken Time". Of these, "One of Our Own", "Lick the Strawberry", "Salt of the Earth", "Training" and "Reserves" take place in military spaces, mainly bases. Many of the characters are dressed in IDF uniforms throughout large parts of the filmed material. In the "Training" series, Barbash examines, through military reality, issues in Israeli society such as: domestic violence, difficulties in absorbing new immigrants, problems in the encounter between Haredim and the secular world.

The Holocaust is also a recurring theme in Barbash's work in "The Kastner Trial", "My First Sonny", "Spring 1941", "Capo in Jerusalem", "Black Honey: The Poetry of Abraham Sutzkever's Life" and "The Choice of Nitza".

The theme of guilt appears in all the works mentioned, as well as in "Signed for Life", "Diana's Child" and "The Naked Truth".

Many of Barbash's protagonists struggle against their fate in a crushing social and personal reality. Examples of this are Bruno in "Capo in Jerusalem", Arthur in "Spring 1941", the refuseniks in "With a Clear Conscience", Rafa in "One of Our Own", Uri and Issam in "Behind Bars" and Gabi Ben Yakar in the film of the same name.

In addition, Barbash deals with the arts themselves, emphasizing their social and ethical context. Examples of this can be found in "Jewish Soul Music," "Gan Eden," "Ahove Ozeri," "Beer Halav in the Middle of a City," "Adam's Prayer: The Story of Nola Chelton," and "Black Honey: The Poetry of Abraham Sutzkever's Life," which deal with music, poetry, and theater.

== Filmography ==
=== Documentary Films ===
- Jewish Soul Music (1975)
- A Weekday (1976)
- This is not paradise and we are not angels (1976)
- Shoshana's Children (1977)
- Heaven" (1977)
- Tammy's Soldiers (1978)
- With a Clear Conscience (2004)
- Be'er Halav in the Middle of a City (2012)
- A Man's Prayer: The Story of Nola Chelton (2013)
- Black Honey: The Poetry of the Life of Abraham Sutzkever (2018)
- Nitza's Choice (2022)
- Broken Time (2023)

=== Feature films ===
- Ot Cain (1982)
- Beyond the Walls (1984)
- Unsettled Land (1987)
- One of Us (1989)
- The Eagle's Path (1990)
- Real Time (1991)
- Beyond the Walls 2 (1992)
- Lick the Strawberry (1992)
- Salt of the Earth (2006)
- Spring 1941 (2008)
- Kapo in Jerusalem (2015)

=== Dramas and Television Series ===
- In the Seventh Heaven (1978)
- Seal for Life (1979)
- Gabi Ben Yakar (1982)
- The Kastner Trial (1994) A three-episode drama series produced by Israeli Channel 1, based on a play by Motti Lerner. Won the Israeli Academy of Film and Television Award.
- Power of Attorney (1994)
- Seaton (1995)
- Route 300 (1997)
- Tironut - a Television series (1998)
- The Institute (2001)
- My First Sonny (2002)
- Milouim - a television series (2005)
- Diana's Child (2005)
- Good Intentions (2008)
- The Naked Truth (2008)
- The Girl from Oslo (2020)
