= Eran Preis =

American dramatist

- Born: Eran Preis; March 24, 1947 (age 79)
- Occupations: screenwriter, film director, film producer, playwright
- Years active: 1979–present
- Spouse: Andrea Garson Preis

Eran Preis (born 24 March 1947) is an Israeli–American director, screenwriter, playwright, and producer. Beyond the Walls, a film he co-wrote in 1984, was nominated for an Academy Award for Best Foreign Language Film. He has taught screenwriting and International Cinema for decades.

== Biography ==
Born in Afula, Mandatory Palestine, Eran Preis, is a naturalized American citizen. Currently he is Professor and Director of the Graduate Program at Temple University, Dept. of Film and Media Arts. Since 1979 his plays were on the major theaters in the country. In 1983 he wrote the screenplay, Behind Bars (בעברית: מאחורי הסורגים) and a year later the film was nominated for the Oscar Award. He lives and works in Philadelphia. Married to Andrea, they have three sons.

== Film Work ==
Eran worked for fifteen years as a playwright and screenwriter for the Israeli television, theater and film industries. Beyond the Walls, a film he co/wrote in 1984, was nominated for an Academy Award in the Best Foreign Film Category. Five of his plays have been produced professionally, and he has been awarded the prestigious King David Award in Israel, among others. He received the New Filmmaker Award at the Philadelphia Jewish Film Festival for his documentary, "The Case of Jonathan Pollard."

His documentaries include "Patricia Baltimore"(2007); "Viewfinder" (2004); "Bet Herut-The End of the Beginning"(2003); "The Case of Jonathan Pollard" (2001).

== Awards for Creative Accomplishments ==
- "Patricia Baltimore" 2007. Selected for show in four festivals and shown on WHYY, (PBS Philadelphia).
- "Bet Herut-the End of the Beginning" is being distributed by Cinema Guild, Inc in New York, 2005. Selected for show in three of Israel main Cinematheques, Tel Aviv, Haifa, and Rosh Pina. Selected for show at The Philadelphia International Film Festival, the Athens Film Festival, and the Dallas Film and Video Festival. Ethnographic Festival De film de Montreal 1/29-30/05.
- "Viewfinder" documentary, produced and directed, 2004. Selected for the Jury award Finalist in the Docrumentary Category of the UFVA Association. Selected for show at: the Black Earth Film Festival in Galesburg, IL 10/2005.
- "The Case of Jonathan Pollard", documentary, directed and co-produced, received the New Filmmaker Award for, Philadelphia Jewish Film Festival 2003. Selected for show at: Toronto Jewish Film Festival, 2002. Vancouver Jewish Film Festival, 2002. Philadelphia Jewish Film Festival, 2003. The Dallas Video Festival, 2002. The Fort Lauderdale International Film and Video Festival, 2002. The George Lindsey UNA Film Festival, 2003. The Wilmington Film Festival, 2003. The Daytona Beach Film Festival, 2003. The Bucks County video Festival, 2003

== Filmography ==
Year	Title	Role
1979	Sentenced For Life	writer
1982	Ot Kain (Stigma)	writer
1982	Gabi Ben Yakar	writer
1984	Me'Ahorei Hasoragim (Beyond the Walls)	writer
1987	Unsettled Land	writer
2001	The Case of Jonathan Pollard	Director
2003	Bet Herut- The End of the Beginning	Director
2004	Viewfinder	Director
2007	Patricia Baltimore	Director
2012	The Jonathan's Return	Director and actor

== Other awards ==
- Distinguished Alumni Award Ohio University, 2008, for his body of work.
- Unsettled Land 109 minutes feature film, co-written. Selected for show at the Israeli film Festival in NY 1988, and the Tokyo International Film Festival, Tokyo, 1988
- "Beyond The Walls" was selected as the winner of the second best film produced in Israel during the last forty years, Israel, 1988. Received an Academy Award nomination, Oscar, for Best Foreign Film Category, USA, 1984. International critics Award, Venice Film Festival, Italy, 1984 First Prize, Salerno Festival, 1984. Winner of Best Script, Israeli "Oscar" (Awards of the Israeli Film Academy), 1984.
- "Stigma", Received the Israeli Cinema Award in the Best Actor Category for film in Israel, 1982.
- "Sentenced For Life", King David Award for Best Original TV Play, Israel, 1979.
- "Paula", King David Award nomination for best theatrical play, Israel, 1979.
