= April Fool (1989 film) =

- Theatrical release poster
- אחד באפריל
- Directed by: Menachem Zilberman
- Screenplay by: Menachem Zilberman
- Produced by: Doron Eran
- Starring: Tzipi Shavit; Sefi Rivlin
- Cinematography: Amnon Salomon
- Edited by: Zion Avrahamian
- Music by: Yitzhak Klepter
- Release date: April 1989
- Running time: 81 minutes
- Country: Israel
- Language: Hebrew

April Fool (Hebrew: אחד באפריל, romanized: Ehad B'April) is a 1989 Israeli children's slapstick comedy, written and directed by Menachem Zilberman, and starring Tzipi Shavit and Sefi Rivlin.

Among the children appearing in the film is Natasha Braunstein, who later launched a successful film career as Natasha Lyonne.

The film was narrated by actress Sarit Baruch Sari.

The film was made at a time when practical joke reality television and films were popular in Israel. It was essentially a parody of the genre. Menachem Zilberman wrote and directed the film, which starred Sefi Rivlin and Tzipi Shavit, two of Israel's leading entertainers at the time, in the hope of creating a blockbuster, but the film proved to be a commercial failure.

== Cast ==
Actor	Character	Comments
Tzipi Shavit	Tzipi	
Sefi Rivlin	Pitzi	
Naftali Alter	Grandfather	
Dean Zilberman	David	Boy
Shula Chen	David's Mother	
Natasha Braunstein	Natasha	Girl
Menachem Zilberman	Minister of Laughter	
Yigal Shilon	Minister of Diets	
Rolanda Chagrin	Health Minister	
Gani Tamir	Minister of Communications	
Yisrael Rabinovitz	Minister Without Portfolio	
Dani Segev	Defense Minister	
Sarit Baruch Sari		Narrator
