= Ad Sof Halaylah =

1985 film

Ad Sof Halayah
- Directed by: Eitan Green
- Written by: Eitan Green
- Starring: Assi Dayan
- Release date: 1985
- Running time: 97 minutes
- Country: Israel
- Language: Hebrew

Ad Sof Halaylah (English: Into the Night ) is a 1985 Israeli drama film written and directed by Eitan Green. The film was selected as the Israeli entry for Best Foreign Language Film at the 58th Academy Awards but was not accepted as a nominee.

== Plot ==
Giora (Assi Dayan) runs a bar and dreams of opening a restaurant. He has made a mess of his life — his marriage is in trouble since he is pathologically cheating on his wife; his parents (Yosef Millo and Orna Porat) have separated; and his father arrives for an extended visit from Nahariya. Giora spends time with his army buddies, recalling their experiences during the War in Lebanon. His father is undergoing a major life crisis and finds both the loneliness of the city and his son's lifestyle unappealing. As a non-Jew in a Jewish society, he feels estranged, an outsider who has never been able to adapt, and contemplates suicide. Eventually, Giora's parents decide to attempt a reconciliation until tragedy strikes.

== Cast ==
- Assi Dayan as Giora
- Yosef Millo as Bernard
- Orna Porat as Ruth
- Dani Roth as Dudi
- Haya Pik-Pardo as Sheri
- Lasha Rosenberg as Karen

== See also ==
- List of submissions to the 58th Academy Awards for Best Foreign Language Film
- List of Israeli submissions for the Academy Award for Best Foreign Language Film
