= Beni Virtzberg =

Israeli writer

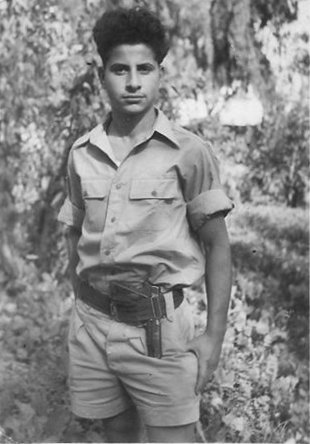
Beni Virtzberg in 1948, in Palmach uniform

Virtberg's autobiography, From Death to Battle: Auschwitz Survivor and Palmach Fighter

Beni Virtzberg (Hebrew: בני וירצברג; sometimes written Beni Wircberg August 12, 1928 – August 4, 1968) was an Israeli forester, Holocaust survivor and writer who was among the first in Israel to write an autobiographical account of his experiences during and after the Holocaust. He began writing his book Migei Haharega Lesha'ar Hagai (From the Valley of Slaughter to the Gate of the Valley) in the wake of the Adolf Eichmann trial, when court testimony by survivors prompted Israelis to openly and publicly discuss what the survivors had lived through.

== Biography ==
Virtzberg was born in Altona, Hamburg, Germany, to Gabriel Gustav, a merchant, and Rachel, a university graduate and homemaker.

Alarmed by the events of Kristallnacht in 1938, the family relocated to Poland and moved into the Jewish quarter in Sosnowiec. They were subsequently transferred to the Środula ghetto during the war, and on August 1, 1943, the ghetto was liquidated, and they were sent to Auschwitz.

Virtzberg's mother was killed upon their arrival at the camp. Virtzberg and his father were separated from one another, prompting Virtzberg to turn to one of the Nazi officers nearby and ask him to let the two of them stay together. By fate, the officer he approached was Josef Mengele, who supervised the selection of prisoners in the camp. Mengele opted to spare the father's life, and young Beni was assigned to work in the camp hospital where Mengele conducted his notorious experiments.

For several weeks he served as Mengele's personal servant and errand boy. Mengele spared Virtzberg's father from subsequent selections, and assigned the father to a block where Virtzberg was able to smuggle him food.

In January 1945, with Allied troops approaching, Auschwitz was vacated and its remaining prisoners were forced into a death march in an attempt to conceal evidence of the atrocities that took place there. Virtzberg's father was too ill to walk, and when he finally collapsed an S.S. soldier shot and killed him as Virtzberg watched in horror.

After he was liberated, Virtzberg spent a few months in the town of Santa Maria in Italy before immigrating to Israel as part of the Youth Aliyah in November 1945. There he was taken in by members of Kibbutz Givat HaShlosha, where he trained for service in the Palmach, the military force organized by Jews in what was then the British Mandate of Palestine.

He joined the Palmach in February 1948 and fought in 1948 Arab–Israeli War. During the war he participated in efforts to break the blockade of Jerusalem's Jewish residents, and later he joined in the battles down in Negev Desert, during which four of his brothers in arms were killed.

After his release from the army, Virtzberg married Rachel Issachar (Bashari), a native of Rehovot of Yemenite ancestry who like Vitzberg fought in the Palmach. Virtzberg worked for the Jewish National Fund as a forester, and later directed the research department for the Southern region forestry operation. During his tenure there, he developed the Liman irrigation system, a technique inspired by Nabataean irrigation methods.

His book, which was published in 1967, did not meet with commercial success and was eclipsed by the flood of books published following Israel's victory in the Six-Day War. The book chronicled his experiences and those of nine friends who like him survived the Holocaust, immigrated to Israel, and participated in the 1948 Arab–Israeli War. He wrote:

"Ten children together left the gates of death, six of us were left, not six orphaned children but six fighters. We fought and will fight when necessary, so that Jewish children, wherever they are, shall never become orphaned as we were."

The Israeli historian Avihu Ronen described Virtzberg's book as follows: "This is a unique book that was ahead of its time, and includes extremely important and authentic personal testimony. Virtzberg's story is importantly unique and has no parallel among the various testimonials and stories from the Holocaust."

On August 4, 1968, a little over a week before turning 40 and plagued with depression, Virtzberg committed suicide via gunshot in his family home, leaving behind his wife Rachel, a son, Ilan Virtzberg, who went on to become an acclaimed songwriter and performer, and a daughter, Dahlia Virtzberg. At his funeral, the chief rabbi of Be'er Sheva, Rabbi Eliyahu Kushelevsky, eulogized him by noting: "Eichmann killed him twenty-five years ago. But we only received the body today."

== Autobiography ==
Virtzberg's book was unusual for its time. It was the first eyewitness account by a Holocaust survivor in which the State of Israel played an essential role in the narrative: Virtzberg's account went beyond his experiences in the camps and described how he immersed himself in his adopted new homeland and how he participated in the armed struggle for its existence. It was one of the few books in Israel at the time to offer harrowing details of life in the Nazi concentration camps. Although the Eichmann trial had broken the implicit taboo among Israelis regarding the Holocaust, many survivors, including those who had written for most of their lives, remained uncomfortable committing their experiences to paper for various reasons.

Virtzberg decided to lay bare his past as an uprooted refugee despite having willingly forged a new Israeli identity and all but erased his diaspora identity. By his own admission, writing the book was an emotionally wrenching process. His book describes life in Auschwitz from the vantage point of a minor, and offers a rare perspective on Mengele and his experiments on human subjects.

On the one hand, Virtzberg's narrative challenged the conventional view at the time of survivors as "human dust" who passively accepted the generosity of their Israeli saviours. But it also challenged more recent narratives that viewed the absorption process as one that was forced upon immigrants. Virtzberg describes voluntarily choosing to be a "new Jew". In his book he sought acceptance not just as a fighter and a "new Jew" but also as someone who identified himself as an "old Jew".

At the time, Israelis had only partial knowledge about the Holocaust, which fed negative stereotypes and hasty judgments towards Holocaust survivors. The Israeli author Rivka Gurfine, writing in 1965, described a partition separating survivors from the Israeli native population:

Fate, which honors the daring and protects the courageous, dictated that those who accepted their deaths and walked towards it thousands of times remained like a flag planted atop ruins, as bearers of a grand legend. How unfortunate it is that even these days, their hard journey has not yet ended, even after being drawn to the source of strength, their lighthouse, whose light drew them from all depths; their blood is laced with memories and echoes that provide them both a burden and an asset. It requires great effort, both ours and theirs, to bring down the partition that the past has erected, their unique past of which we have no part.

Through his book, Virtzberg aimed to change this attitude among Israeli natives and remove this partition, but he was unable to achieve his goal.

The book did not meet with commercial success. This profoundly affected Virtzberg, who descended into the dark past his book had resurrected. His failure to achieve the goals he set out to accomplish in writing the book turned into an existential threat in the form of a deep depression. His case was another example of the dilemma between writing and life described years later by the Spanish writer Jorge Semprún, himself a survivor of the Buchenwald concentration camp, whereby those who wrote about their memories too soon often ended up paying for it with their lives.

In December 2008 the book was reissued in a new edition by Carmel Publishing, including a new introduction, afterword, and photographs.

In August 2017 the book was published in English by Yad Vashem, From Death to Battle: Auschwitz Survivor and Palmach Fighter.

== See also ==
- Sh'erit ha-Pletah
- The Holocaust in art and literature
