= Ilan Virtzberg =

Israeli musician

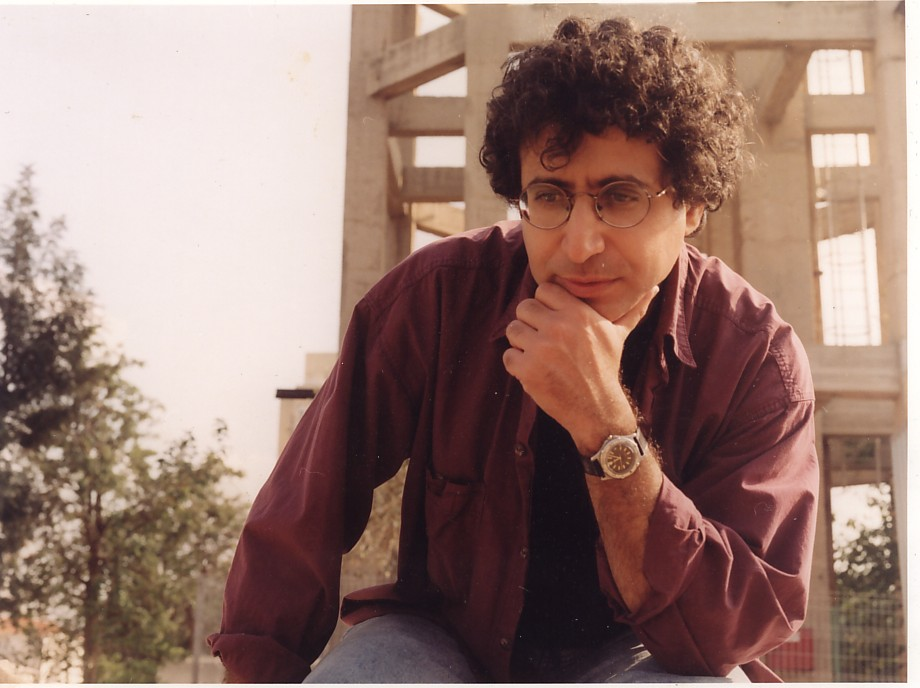
Ilan Virtzberg

Ilan Virtzberg (Hebrew: אילן וירצברג; born September 12, 1951) is an Israeli composer, arranger, music producer, guitarist, and singer. He is described as "one of the most sought-after composers and producers in Israeli pop in the 80s and early 90s".

== Biography ==
He was born in Beersheva to the family of a Holocaust survivor Beni Virtzberg. During his service in the IDF he was a guitarist in the air force band. After the army he studied in the Samuel Rubin Israel Academy of Music (now Buchmann-Mehta School of Music).

During 1982–2024 Virtzberg released 20 albums.

His first album B'tzir Tov (1982, remastered in 2002) in collaboration with Shimon Galbats based on the songs of Yona Wallach ranked 18th in the list of 100 best Israeli albums by the newspaper Yedioth Ahronoth in 2005.

== Filmography ==
Virtzberg composed music for about 15 feature, documentary and TV films, including:

- 1986: The Smile of the Lamb
- 1989: One of Us
- 1987: Himmo, King of Jerusalem
- 1984: Beyond the Walls

== Family ==
His sister is Dahlia Virtzberg-Rofe', researcher in the area of mental health and activist for human rights of mentally deficient people.
