= Ilene Beckerman =

American writer

- Born: 1935 (age 90–91)
- Occupation: Writer
- Known for: Love, Loss, and What I Wore (1995)

Ilene Beckerman (born 1935) is an American writer, who was not published until she was 60 years old, and a former advertising agency executive. She is best known for her first book Love, Loss, and What I Wore, published in 1995, which in 2008 became a successful play written by Nora Ephron and Delia Ephron based on her book.

== Early life ==
Ilene Beckerman was born in 1935, and grew up in Manhattan in the 1940s and 1950s.

== Career ==
Beckerman did not start her career as a writer until she was almost 60 years old, after having risen to become vice-president of an advertising agency. Her journalism has appeared in the New York Times, the Los Angeles Times, and Ladies' Home Journal.

In 1995, at the age of 60, Beckerman published Love, Loss, and What I Wore, which Publishers Weekly called a " "captivating little pictorial autobiography for adults ... a wry commentary on the pressures women constantly face to look good".

In 2011, she published, The Smartest Woman I Know, an account of her life with her grandmother, Ettie Goldberg, who she lived with after her mother died.

== Selected publications ==
- Love, Loss, and What I Wore (1995)
- The Smartest Woman I Know (2011)
- Mother of the Bride
- Makeovers at the Beauty Counter of Happiness
- What We Do for Love

== Personal life ==
When she was 12 years old, her mother died, and she went to live in Manhattan with her grandparents, who ran a candy store on Madison Avenue between 64th and 65th Streets.

In 1955, aged 20 years, Beckerman married her Boston sociology professor, 17 years her senior. The marriage was short-lived and ended in divorce. She married again, and had six children, one of whom died in infancy, and eventually divorced.

Beckerman lives in Bethlehem Township, New Jersey, with her husband Stanley.
