= One of Us (1989 film) =

- Directed by: Uri Barbash
- Written by: Benny Barbash
- Screenplay by: Benny Barbash
- Produced by: Gadi Levy
- Starring: Alon Aboutboul; Sharon Alexander; Yoel Ben-Simhon; Shaul Mizrahi; Alon Neuman; Ofer Shikartsi; Dalia Shimko
- Cinematography: Amnon Salomon
- Edited by: Tova Asher
- Music by: Ilan Virtzberg
- Production company: Israfilm Ltd
- Release date: 1989
- Running time: 110 minutes
- Country: Israel
- Language: Hebrew

One of Us (Hebrew: אחד משלנו, translit. Echad Mi'shelanu) is a 1989 Israeli drama film directed by Uri Barbash. It stars Alon Aboutboul, Sharon Alexander, Yoel Ben-Simhon, Shaul Mizrahi, Alon Neuman, Ofer Shikartsi and Dalia Shimko.

== Plot ==
A film depicts three good friends, Amir, Yotam, and Rafa, who upon their enlistment in the IDF volunteer to be paratroopers, undergo the consolidation into brigade units, and are accepted into an elite unit[2]. During their paratrooper training, they undergo a training course as fighters, and become part of a family of fighters in which loyalty to each other is above all else. However, Rafa is forced to retire from the training due to an injury caused by the negligence of their tough commander, known as the "White Angel." Rafa goes to serve as an investigator in the military police.Three years later, Rafa is sent to the unit's camp, located in the territories, and meets Yotam, who serves as a company commander in the unit. He is tasked with investigating an incident in which a Palestinian detainee was killed who was suspected of murdering their friend Amir, who was also an officer in the unit. Rafa finds himself torn between his loyalty and love for his friends and his commitment to uncovering the truth, which everyone in the unit prefers to cover up except for him and a young soldier named Tamar.Towards the end of the film, Yotam realizes that Rafa is about to reveal the findings of the investigation, in which he discovered that the detainee did not escape as initially reported, but was beaten and tortured and finally shot while handcuffed. As a result, the unit's officers beat Rafa and leave him wounded in his room. Tamar feeds the wounded Rafa and begs him to leave the base and report what he discovered to the military police. While the unit is organizing to carry out a raid on the refugee camp near the base, against the terrorist organizations, Rafa has gathered his belongings and, with Tamar's help, is about to leave the camp. Viewers in the film are convinced that Rafa has chosen to set aside the proverb that was most associated with him and his comrades in the training camp: "One for all - all for one," to let old loyalties to the unit and his comrades fade and to publish the truth. However, when Yotam passes him on the way, when Rafa is standing next to the burning crematorium, it seems that Rafa has no intention of bringing the truth to light, but rather to burn the evidence indicating the murder and in effect remain "one of us."

== Cast ==
- Alon Aboutboul as Yotam
- Sharon Alexander as Rafa
- Yoel Ben-Simhon as Platoon Soldier
- Shaul Mizrahi as The White Angel
- Alon Neuman as Nahshon
- Ofer Shikartsi as Erez
- Dalia Shimko as Tamar

== Reception ==
The film was submitted by Israel for the Academy Award for Best Foreign Language Film at the 62nd Academy Awards, but was not selected.

== See also ==
- List of submissions to the 62nd Academy Awards for Best Foreign Language Film
- List of Israeli submissions for the Academy Award for Best Foreign Language Film
