= Beyond the Walls (1984 film) =

1984 film

- Directed by: Uri Barbash
- Written by: Benny Barbash; Eran Preis
- Produced by: Rudy Cohen; Katriel Schori
- Starring: Arnon Zadok; Mohammad Bakri; Assi Dayan; Rami Danon
- Cinematography: Amnon Salomon
- Edited by: Tova Asher
- Music by: Ilan Virtzberg
- Release date: 27 September 1984
- Running time: 103 minutes
- Country: Israel
- Language: Hebrew
- Box office: $400,000

Beyond the Walls (Hebrew: מאחורי הסורגים, MeAhorei HaSoragim, lit. "Behind the Bars") is a 1984 Israeli film directed by Uri Barbash and written by his brother Benny Barbash and Eran Preis. It was nominated for the Academy Award for Best Foreign Language Film.

== Plot ==
The story takes place in the high-security block of the Central Israel Prison Service jail. Uri and Issam are the leaders of the Israeli and Palestinian prisoner groups, respectively. After a musical performance in the prison, a row breaks out between Hoffman, a Jewish inmate, and a Palestinian. When Hoffman is killed, the security officer initiates a fight between the sides, pinning the blame for the murder on Issam's cell. Doron, the only Jewish prisoner in the Arab cell, is asked to sign a document implicating Issam in the crime but refuses and dies by suicide. He leaves a note saying that his cell was not responsible for the crime. As a result, Uri and Issam begin a general hunger strike and make personal sacrifices in order not to break it.

== Characters ==
- Uri (Arnon Zadok) is serving his second sentence for armed robbery, and has been a criminal from a young age. He is the leader of all Jewish prisoners in his cellblock.
- Issam (Mohammad Bakri) is a Fatah terrorist who turns moderate in prison. He is the leader of the Palestinian cell.
- Asaf (Asi Dayan) is a former IDF officer sentenced for contacting a PLO agent in Europe. He is initially disliked and distrusted by both sides, but normalizes his relations with Uri.
- "The Songbird" (Boaz Sharabi) is a talented singer and musician from Uri's cell, and the first prisoner to participate in a national music festival in Israel.

== See also ==
- List of submissions to the 57th Academy Awards for Best Foreign Language Film
- List of Israeli submissions for the Academy Award for Best Foreign Language Film
