= 26th Moscow International Film Festival =

Film festival

- Location: Moscow, Russia
- Founded: 1959
- Awards: Grand Prix
- Festival date: 18–27 July 2004
- Website: Website

The 26th Moscow International Film Festival was held from 18 to 27 July 2004. The Golden George was awarded to the Russian film Our Own directed by Dmitriy Meshiev.

== Jury ==
- Alan Parker (United Kingdom – chairman of the jury)
- Jerzy Stuhr (Poland)
- Boris Akunin (Russia)
- Armen Medvedev (Russia)
- Barbara Sukowa (Germany)
- Humbert Balsan (France)

== Films in competition ==
The following films were selected for the main competition:

English title	Original title	Director(s)	Production country
Angulimala	Angulimala	Sutape Tunnirut	Thailand
Ben's Biography	Habiographia Shel Ben	Dan Wolman	Israel
Goddess of Mercy	Yù Guān Yīn	Ann Hui	China
Revolution of Pigs	Sigade revolutsioon	Jaak Kilmi, René Reinumägi	Estonia
Harvest Time	Vremya zhatvy	Marina Razbezhkina	Russia
Details	Detaljer	Christian Petri	Sweden
A Different Loyalty	A Different Loyalty	Marek Kanievska	United States, United Kingdom
Earth's Skin	La piel de la tierra	Manuel Fernandez	Spain
Olga's Summer	Olgas Sommer	Nina Grosse	Germany
National Bomb	Natsionalnaya bomba	Vagif Mustafayev	Azerbaijan, Russia
Portugal S.A.	Portugal S.A.	Ruy Guerra	Portugal
Daddy	Papa	Vladimir Mashkov, Ilya Rubinstein	Russia
Conversations with Mother	Conversaciones con mama	Santiago Carlos Oves	Argentina, Spain
Our Own	Svoi	Dmitriy Meshiev	Russia
Kiss Me First	Prima dammi un bacio	Ambrogio Lo Giudice	Italy
So Cute	Kwiyeowo	Kim Su-hyeon	South Korea
Hazardous and Unhealthy	Varea anthygieina	Antonis Papadoupoulos	Greece

== Awards ==
- Golden George: Our Own by Dmitriy Meshiev
- Special Jury Prize: Silver George: Revolution of Pigs by Jaak Kilmi and René Reinumägi
- Silver George:
  - Best Director: Dmitriy Meshiev for Our Own
  - Best Actor: Bohdan Stupka for Our Own
  - Best Actress: China Zorrilla for Conversations with Mother
- Silver George for the Best Film of the Perspective competition: The Hotel Venus by Hideta Takahata
- Lifetime Achievement Award: Emir Kusturica
- Stanislavsky Award: Meryl Streep
