= An Israeli Love Story =

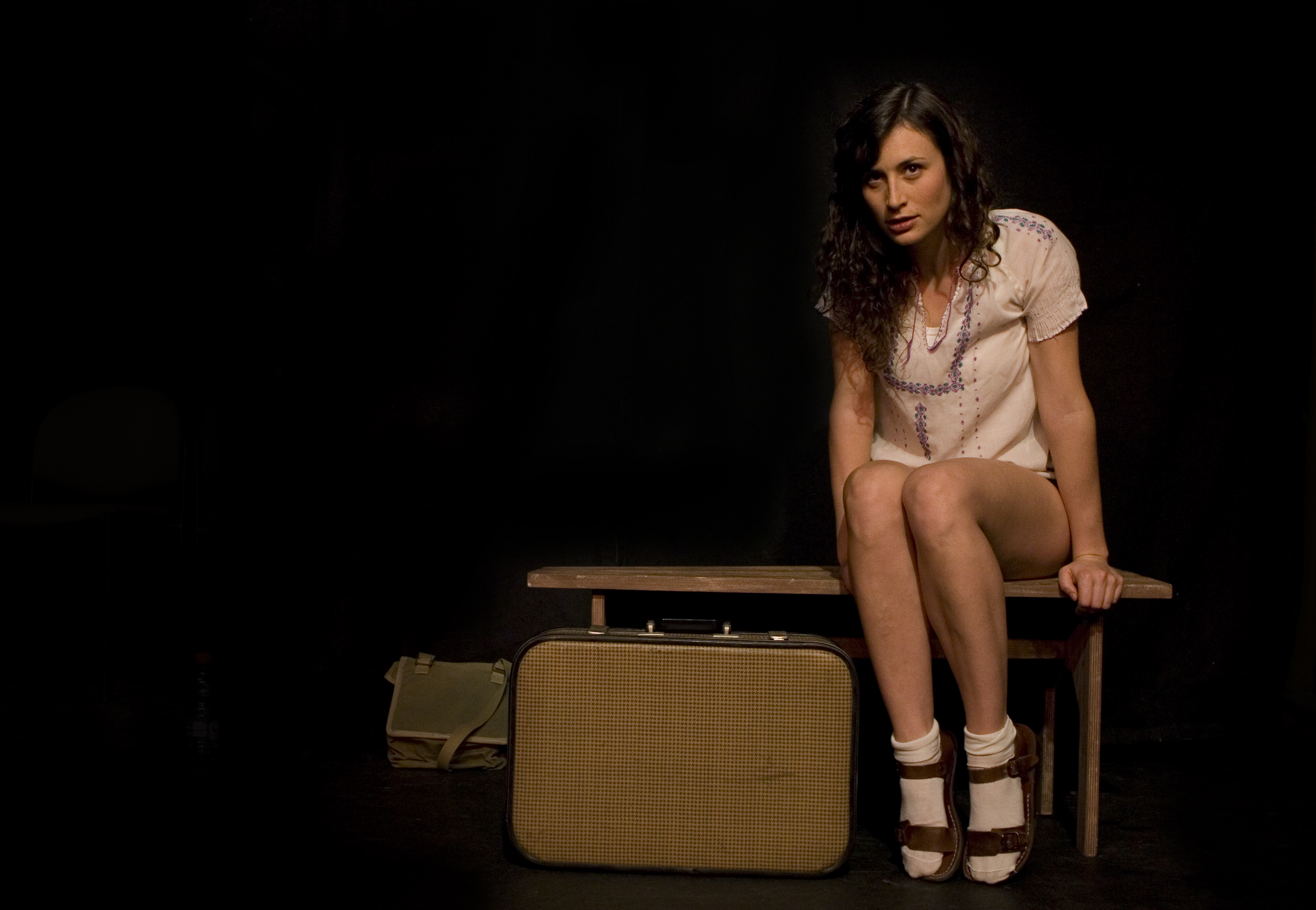
- Adi Bielski in "An Israeli Love Story"
- Original language: Hebrew
- Written by: Pnina Gary
- Genre: Autobiographical
- Setting: 1940s pre-state Israel

Premiere
- Place: Givatayim, Israel

An Israeli Love Story is a play translated from the Hebrew play Sippur Ahava Eretz Yisraeli. It premiered in 2008 and still runs in repertory at Tel Aviv's Givatayim Theater and Cameri Theater.

The play was written by Pnina Gary and is based on her own true life story during the period between 1942 through 1948.

== Stagings ==
The one-woman show was directed by Pnina Gary herself, and it is still performed by Adi Bielski, who won the Israeli Best Actress Award in Fringe Theater in 2009 for this multi-character role.

On March 28, 2011, a special evening marked the celebrating of 250 shows. Attending that evening, were the Israeli Minister of Culture, Mrs Limor Livnat, and the recent winner of the Israeli Sapir Prize for Literature 2011, the writer Yoram Kaniuk.

The play was performed in English at The Leeds Jewish International Performing Arts Festival in 2009, at London's New End Theatre from May 18 to June 6, 2010, and at the National Arts Centre in Ottawa as well as Montreal, Toronto and Washington, DC, in September 2011. The show was also performed in the Harold Green Jewish Theatre in Toronto in 2014.

On April 13, 2013, the play premiered in Paris (translated from English to French) under the name "Une histoire d'amour israélienne". The French production, played by the French actress Estelle Grynszpan, was directed by Pnina Gary as well.

In 2015 Pnina Gary published an autobiographical novel in Hebrew under the same title as the Hebrew title of the monodrama. The book was published under Schocken Books.

In 2016 the film (in Hebrew) "Sipur Ahava Eretz-Israeli" was released, inspired by the monodrama, starring Adi Bielski (as "Margalit Dromi") and directed by Dan Wolman.

In October 2016, the play was translated to Spanish and performed for the first time in Lima, Peru under the name of "Una historia de amor israelí", directed by Gonzalo Tuesta, starring Macla Yamada as Margalit Dromi.

== The title ==
The original Hebrew name of the play is Sippur Ahava Eretz Israeli (An Eretz Israeli Love Story). Eretz means "land" or "country" and the term "Eretz-Israel" ("Land of Israel") is the ancient and traditional name used by the Jewish people for their homeland, especially after the loss of sovereignty and replacing the name "Judea" with "Syria Palaestina" by the Roman Emperor Hadrian. Therefore, the name of the play implies that the story takes place in the British Mandate of Palestine before the establishment of the State of Israel in 1948.

== Synopsis ==
The story begins in the summer of 1942. Fifteen-year-old Margalit, along with her two friends from Moshav Nahalal, is on her way to the youth seminar in Jerusalem. On the bus she meets Ami, a student at Kaduri Agricultural High School. After Ami gets off the bus, Margalit cannot stop thinking about him.

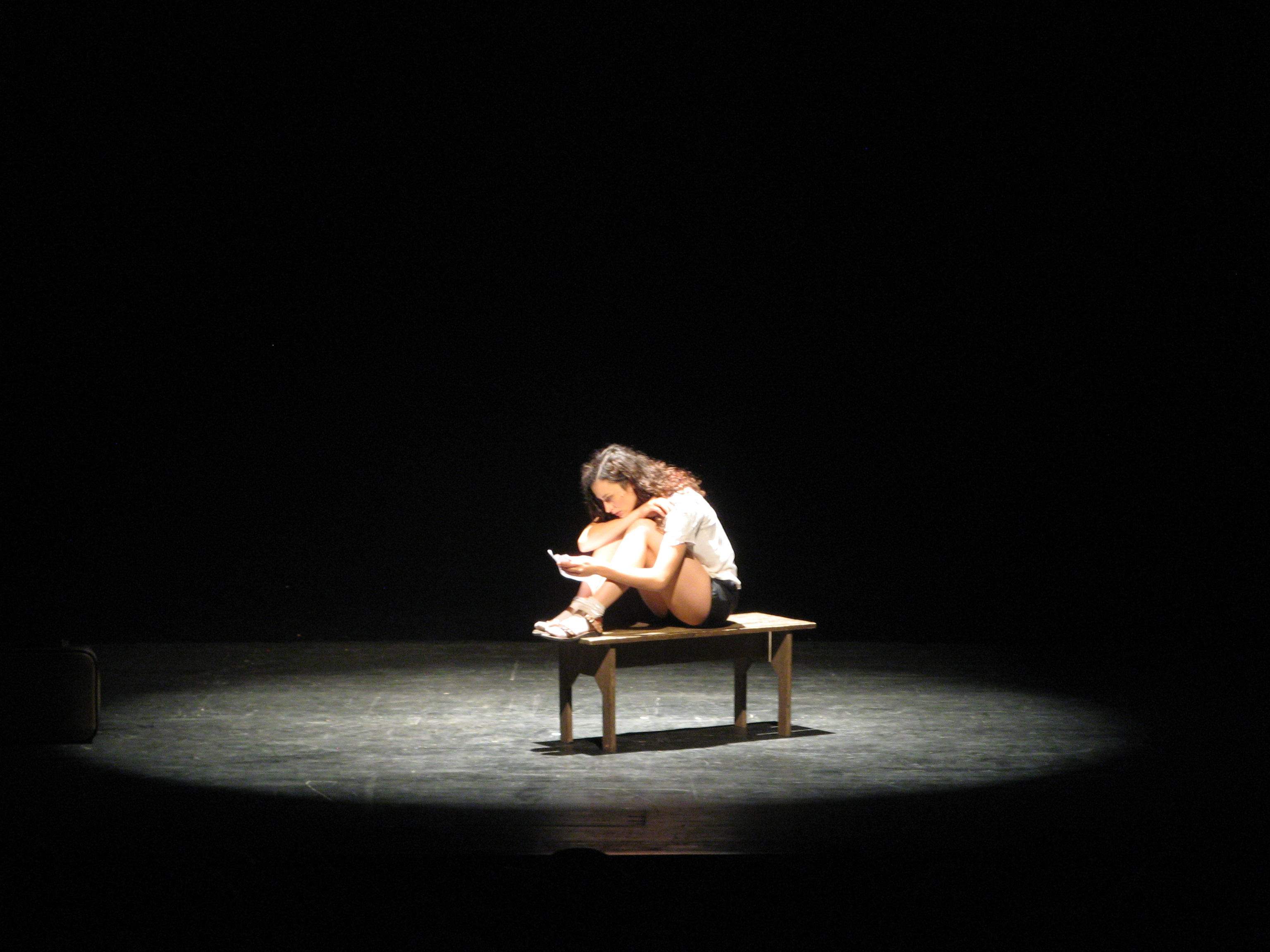
Adi Bielski as Margalit, reading a letter from Ami's mother addressed to her parents.

Six months later, Margalit meets Ami again, this time at her Moshav, Nahalal. He's a soldier in the Palmach now. His Jeep has broken down and Margalit invites him to sleep over at her house. He leaves the next morning.

A year has passed and Margalit is sent by the Nahalal's culture committee to the Youth Instructors Seminar in Kibbutz Yagur. Outside the dining room, she suddenly spots Ami, with another girl. She fails to avoid them. Ami tells Margalit he has been stationed there by the Palmach and introduces his girlfriend. Margalit seems to be out of luck.

In 1945 World War II ends with mixed emotions. Along with the joy of victory, there's also the realization of the catastrophe, the Holocaust. The Tzfonis' relatives in Paris were taken to Auschwitz, and no sign of life is received from the extended family in Russia.

The policy of the White Paper resulted in Holocaust survivors fleeing from Europe, being treated as Illegal immigrants. The increasing flood of aliyah generates a need for more schools and kindergartens. So, at 18, Margalit goes to the Seminar for Kindergarten teachers in Tel Aviv. She resides in a shack with two roommates, and works for a family, both as a nanny, and a housecleaner.

One day, on the bus to the seminar, Margalit encounters Ami. Again. He tells her, that he has separated from the girl from Yagur, and co founded a new Kibbutz, Beit Keshet in the Lower Galilee. Margalit uses the opportunity and invites him to Yafa Gustin's performance at a club in Giv'atayim. When she alights the bus, immediately after Ami told her he was busy and couldn't join her, his friend Motke asks her out. When she declines the offer, he informs her that Ami has a new girlfriend, a new immigrant from Hungary.

Margalit cries her heart out to her roommate, Mikhal, who excitedly mentions that her cousin is a member of Beit Keshet. She comes up with a scheme. She will visit her cousin during the Passover holiday and bring Margalit with, for company.

At Beit Keshet, Margalit is happy to hear from Mikhal's cousin, that there are vacant beds in his room, and that his roommate is some guy called Ami Ben-Avraham.

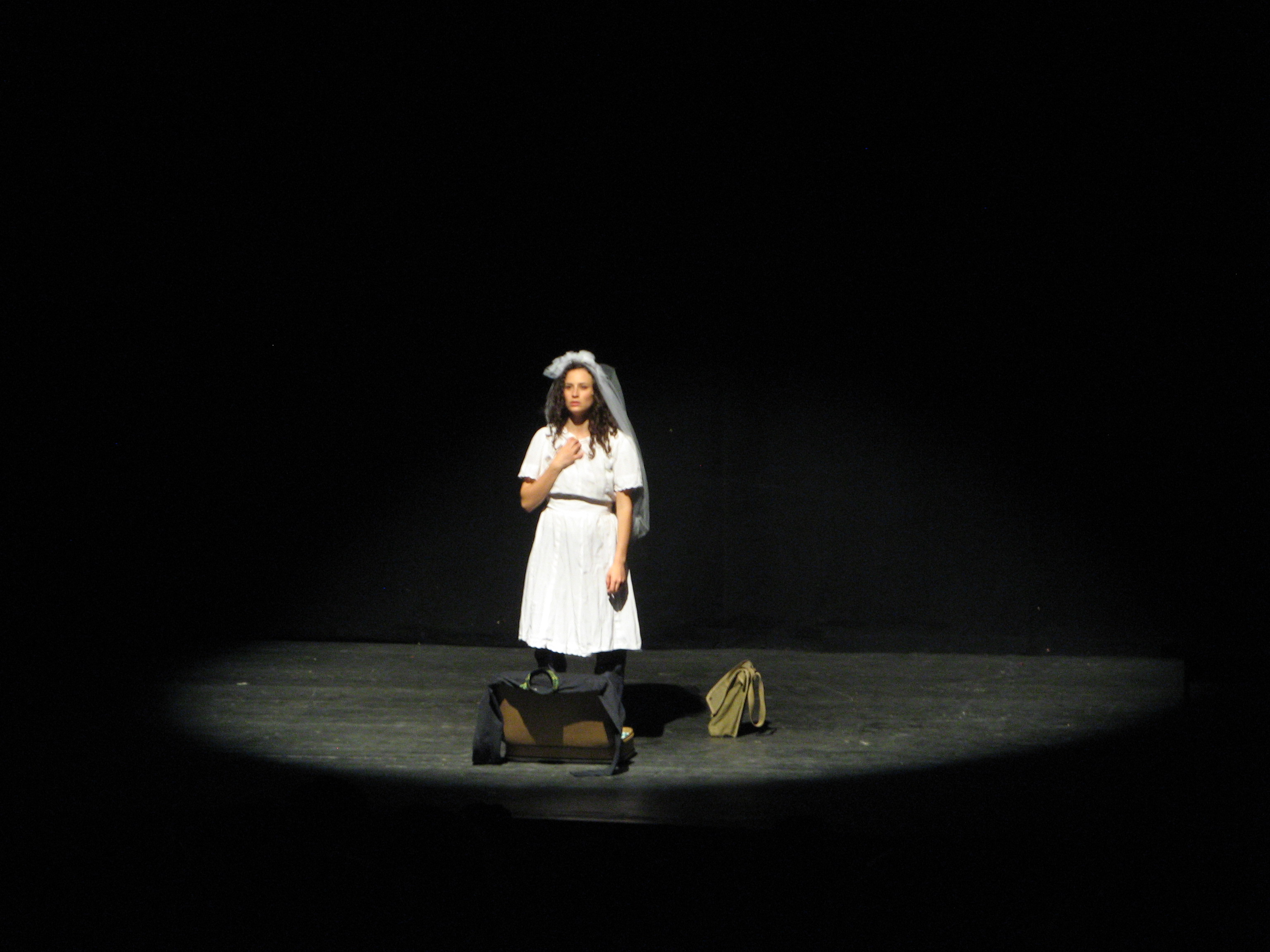
Adi Bielski as Margalit" putting on her wedding gown.

In a Kibbutz, guests take part in the work, and Margalit is sent to work in the kitchen. On her way to the showers, she bumps into Ami and decides to try one last time. She asks him to drive her, on his motorcycle, to a Passover party in Nahalal. Ami agrees. After the party, he tells her that he is finished with his Hungarian immigrant girlfriend, and kisses her for the first time.

In Beit Keshet, On the nearby hill under the Carob tree, Ami shows Margalit the surrounding view. Mount Tavor, the mountains of Gil'ad and Mount Hermon. He points at the houses of the local Bedouin tribe and tells her that their leader, Sheikh Abu-Nimer, is a friend of his father and always declares that he is Ami's brother. Under that tree, Ami asks Margalit to marry him. The wedding date is set for Purim.

In the meantime, the UN resolution for the partition of Palestine on November 29, 1947, marks the beginning of a civil war between the Arabs and the Jews of Palestine, as the following morning the Arabs attack after a night of Jewish celebrations. The Jews are compelled to travel in armored vehicles, as the roads are mostly under Arab control.

It's now 1948 and Margalit has difficulty adapting to the communal life of the Kibbutz, where everything is shared among the members. But Ami makes it very clear. The Kibbutz reflects everything he believes in and he is never going to leave it. Nevertheless, he asks and receives a family room, just for them.

As the preparations for the wedding are in progress in Nahalal, back in Beit Keshet, a friend of Ami tells him that the Arabs' cows are grazing in Beit Keshet's fields, up on the hill near the Carob tree. Ami gathers a few of his friends to drive the cows out of the Kibbutz's fields. In Nahalal, when Margalit comes back from work at the kindergarten, she is told that Beit Keshet is under attack. After driving in an armored car, through road barriers, in the pouring rain, she reaches Beit Keshet, only to learn that the cows were just bait. They were sent there by Sheikh Abu-Nimer to lure the Kibbutz's men into an ambush. Seven of Beit-Keshets men were gunned down. It was supposed to be Ami and Margalit's wedding day.

== Radio newscasts ==
Radio "newscasts" are heard throughout the play, which provide important historical background to the plot:

- 1942, November 4 – The Victory at El Alamein. The threat of Nazi invasion of Eretz-Israel has been thwarted.
- 1943, November 28 – Franklin D. Roosevelt, Joseph Stalin and Winston Churchill decided in Teheran on the timetable for the invasion of Europe.
- 1945, May 8 – Germany has surrendered.
- 1945, September 27 – David Ben-Gurion demands that the British Government abolish the White Paper which forbids Jewish immigration to Eretz Israel, and to allocate 100,000 certificates to the survivors of the death camps.
- 1946, June 29 – The Black Sabbath. The British army raided many towns and Kibbutzim to uncover weapon caches. Tel Aviv and Jerusalem have been placed under military curfew. 2,718 people were arrested, including Moshe Shertok.
- 1947, July 20 – The Illegal immigrant ship Exodus 1947 with its 4,550 Holocaust survivors, has been captured by the British and sent back to Germany.
- 1947, November 29 – The United Nations General Assembly confirmed the partition of Palestine. The Jews will receive 55%: the Negev desert, the coast line and the eastern Galilee. The Arabs will receive the rest. Jerusalem shall remain under international supervision.
- 1948, January 10 – Syrian forces are attacking in the north. Also under attack is Kibbutz Ramat Rachel near Jerusalem. 35 Palmach fighters were killed on their way to besieged Gush Etzion.

== Characters ==
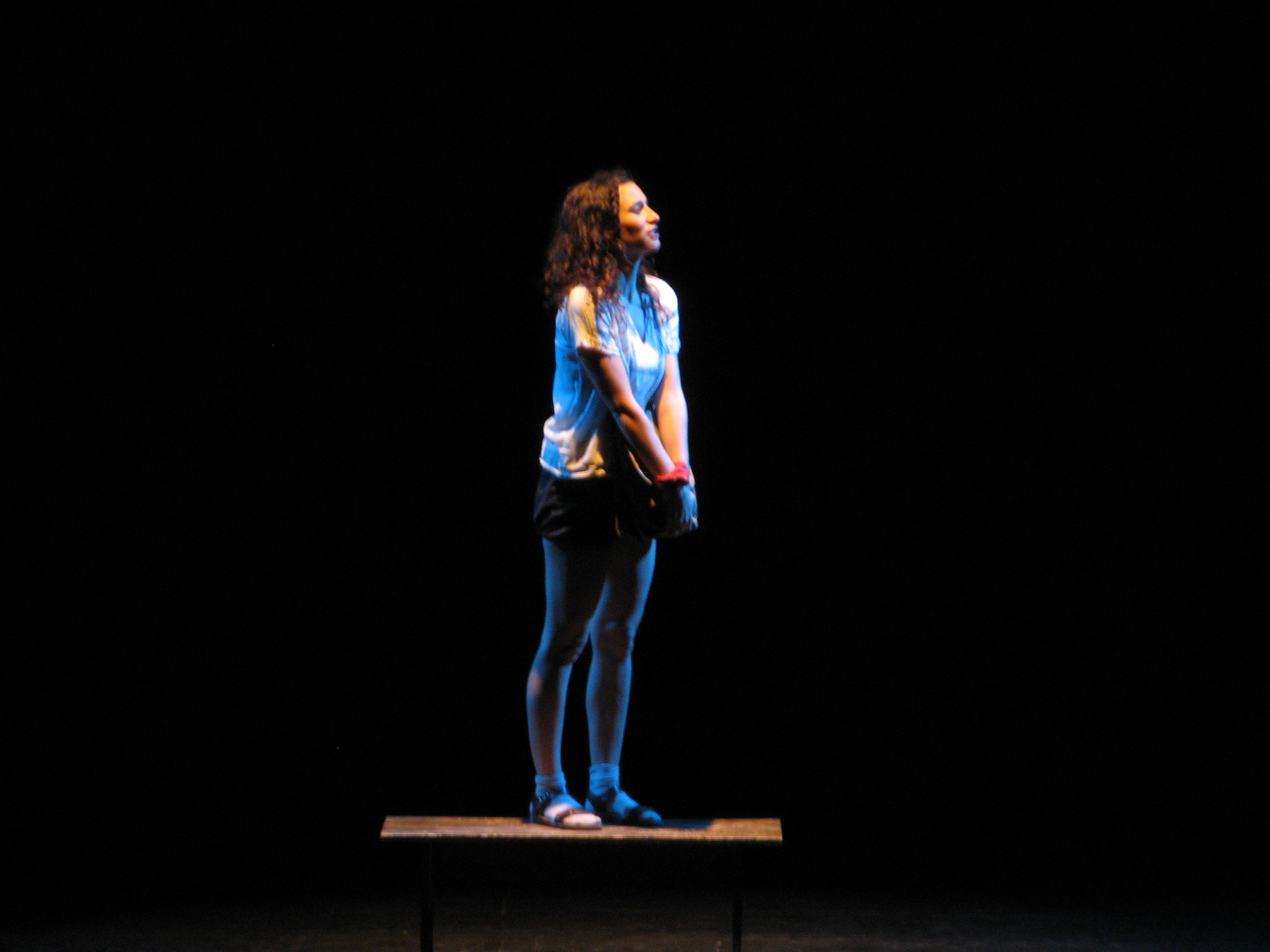
Adi Bielski as Margalit, singing Yafa Gustin's song. The regional council of Eilot, 2010.

1. Margalit Tzfoni – The pseudonym for Pnina Dromi, maiden name of Pnina Gary herself.
2. Ami Ben-Avraham – The pseudonym for 'Eli Ben-Zvi.
3. Ami's mother – Rachel.
4. Yosef Tzfoni – Margalit's father, pseudonym for Yosef Dromi.
5. Tzipora – Margalit's mother.
6. Karasik – The pessimistic neighbour of the Tzfonis in Nahalal.
7. Freudenberg – The German-born member of Nahalal's culture committee.
8. Mishka – The jovial, nosey, Yiddish speaking mail carrier of Nahalal.
9. Hagai – A friend from Nahalal and a student in Kaduri.
10. Efrayim – A former-immigrant instructor at the youth instructors' seminar.
11. Mikhal – Margalit's roommate at the teachers' seminar in Tel Aviv.
12. Motke – Ami's friend from Kibbutz Beit Keshet
13. Mikhal's cousin – Ami's roommate in Beit Keshet.
14. Efi – Beit Keshet's secretary of internal affairs, pseudonym for Sefi Kaspi.
15. A Woman opposed to accepting wedding presents in the Kibbutz.
16. A Man in favor of accepting wedding presents in the Kibbutz.
17. Rivka – volunteeres to supervise the rotation of the wedding presents.
18. Haim Guri – Ami's friend from Kaduri.
19. Shoshik – Ami's jealous female roommate in Beit Keshet.
20. Ruth – Ruth Dayan, the good neighbour in Nahalal and Moshe Dayan's wife.
21. A Guy who carries the bed delivered to Ami and Margalit.
22. A Friend who tells Ami about the Arabs' cows grazing in Beit-Keshet's fields.
23. Efi's mother
24. Ami's father – Yitzhak Ben-Zvi.
