= Night Soldier =

Israeli horror film

- Hebrew: חייל הלילה
- Directed by: Dan Wolman
- Written by: Dan Wolman
- Produced by: Dan Wolman
- Starring: Yehuda Efroni; Iris Kanner; Yftach Katzur; Hillel Ne'eman; Sari Raz; Ze'ev Shimshoni; Galina Swidansky
- Cinematography: Charley Shitrit; Yossi Wein
- Edited by: Shosh Wolman
- Music by: Alex Cagan
- Production companies: Cannon; Wagner-Hallig Film
- Distributed by: Cannon Film Distributors (International
- Release date: 1 June 1984 (Jerusalem Film Festival)
- Running time: 86 minutes
- Country: Israel
- Language: Hebrew

Night Soldier (Hebrew: חייל הלילה, also known as Soldier of the Night) is a 1984 Israeli horror film, with elements of film noir. It was written, produced and directed by Dan Wolman, starring Ze'ev Shimshoni and Iris Kaner.

The low budget film was produced independently, with the help of students taught by Wolman in the film department at Tel Aviv University. The shooting had been conducted over a long period of time, with large breaks during them

The film is considered groundbreaking by critics and scholars. Genre films had been very rare in the Israeli cinema of the 20th century, all the more so horror films. Furthermore, the portrayal of a crazy violent Israeli man in IDF uniforms is widely perceived as revolutionary and subversive.

== Plot ==
The film begins as a group of soldiers gathered around a campfire are horrified when one of their own is brutally murdered after stepping away briefly. The horror of the scene escalates as they discover the soldier's lifeless body, bearing multiple stab wounds.

Zeev Barkai, a young man, was rejected by the army because of a health problem. Zeev is haunted by his unfulfilled dreams of military service. He is burdened by the expectations of his combatant father, a commanding officer. He hangs out in a bar-restaurant and watches as a TV announcer reports on a series of unsolved soldier murders, including the recent one.

Iris, a university student and waitress, unwittingly becomes entangled with Zeev, whose obsession with her turns violent. As Iris learns about Zeev's dark secrets, including his fabricated military service and involvement in the soldier murders.

In the end, Zeev opens fire on a group of soldiers, becomes captured, and takes his own life.

== Reception ==
Upon its release, the film received mixed reviews, and did not perform well at the box office.

Gidi Orsher wrote in Haaretz that "the Israeli reality is a fruitful ground for films which aim to expose it and its dangers" and noted that the film "attempts to do so with a story that follows closely the popular foreign horror films".

In Ha'ir, Nachman Ingber called the film: "A brilliant cinematic achievement, a feast for the eyes". He described it as "Natural, fluid, precise cinema", but criticized the lack of a proper script. Nevertheless, Ingber summarized his review by saying "this is one of the best Israeli films of recent times".

In Al HaMishmar, Danny Warth wrote that the film proclaims to be a response to "aggressiveness, militancy, conformism, and the pressures that society puts on the individual, and above all, to comment on aggression as an act and a background for deep insecurity", but does not do enough to develop these issues. He compared Zeev's character to Dr Jekyll and Mr Hyde, "a convention which has been used in many horror films"

In later years, Israeli film scholars argued that the film has great importance, and praised its originality and boldness.
