= Pnina Gary =

Israeli actress and theatre director (1927–2023)

- פנינה גרי
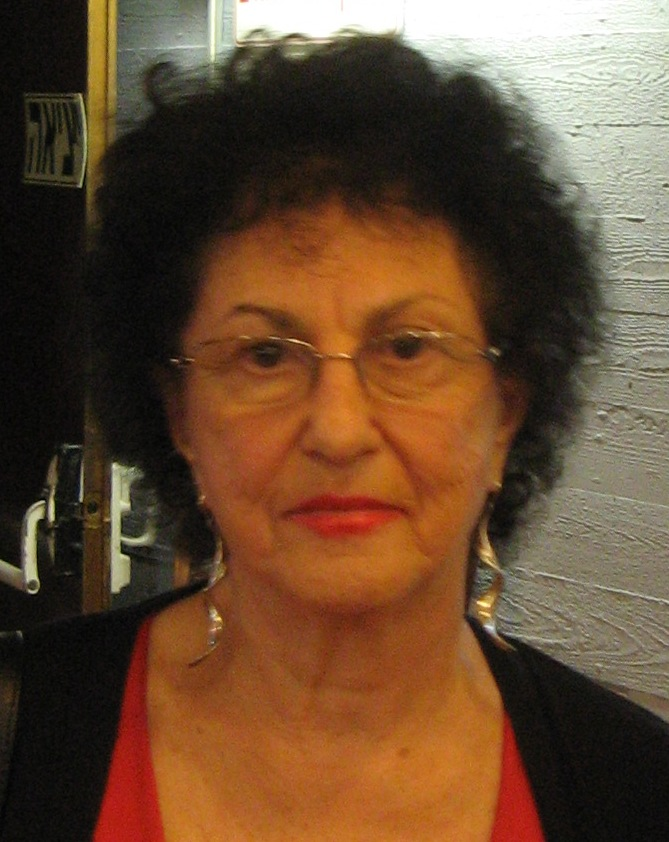
- Gary in 2011
- Born: Pnina Dromi; 24 September 1927; Nahalal, Mandatory Palestine
- Died: 2 August 2023 (aged 95); Tel Aviv, Israel
- Resting place: Nahalal Cemetery
- Occupations: Actress; theatre director
- Spouse: Robert Gary (m. 1949; died 1987)
- Children: 2, including Meirav Gary
- Relatives: Michael Cohen (grandson)

Pnina Gary (Hebrew: פנינה גרי; née Dromi; 24 September 1927 – 2 August 2023) was an Israeli actress and theatre director.

== Biography ==
Pnina Dromi was born and raised in Nahalal, Mandatory Palestine, the daughter of Yosef Dromi (previously Kotlar) and Tzipora Ostrowski. Her parents made aliyah from Ukraine in 1919. Gary attended to Nahalal Agricultural High School (WIZO Nahalal Youth Village), and later the teachers' seminar to become a kindergarten teacher.

In March 1948, during Israel's war for independence, just a few days before she was supposed to marry Eli, the son of Rachel Yanait and Yitzhak Ben-Zvi (later to be the second president of Israel), her Palmach member husband-to-be was killed in an Arab ambush in the fields of their kibbutz, Beit Keshet.

In September 1948, trying to recover from the outcome of the Beit Keshet battle, she volunteered to participate in an expedition of teachers to the DP camps around Munich. She was sent to help set up kindergartens in the camps and work with Jewish children who survived the Holocaust. Six months later, she was sent to reside in Ulm, in order to do the same work in the DP camps around Stuttgart.

In Munich, she met her husband, Robert Gary, a Jewish American journalist, who reported from the camps. They married in Germany in late 1949 and two weeks later moved to Israel. The couple had two daughters, Dorit and Meirav. Through Meirav, she is the grandmother of rapper Michael Cohen.

Gary wrote a weekly column for Davar, an Israeli newspaper, for two years.

Pnina Gary died in Tel Aviv on August 2, 2023, at the age of 95.

== Artistic career ==
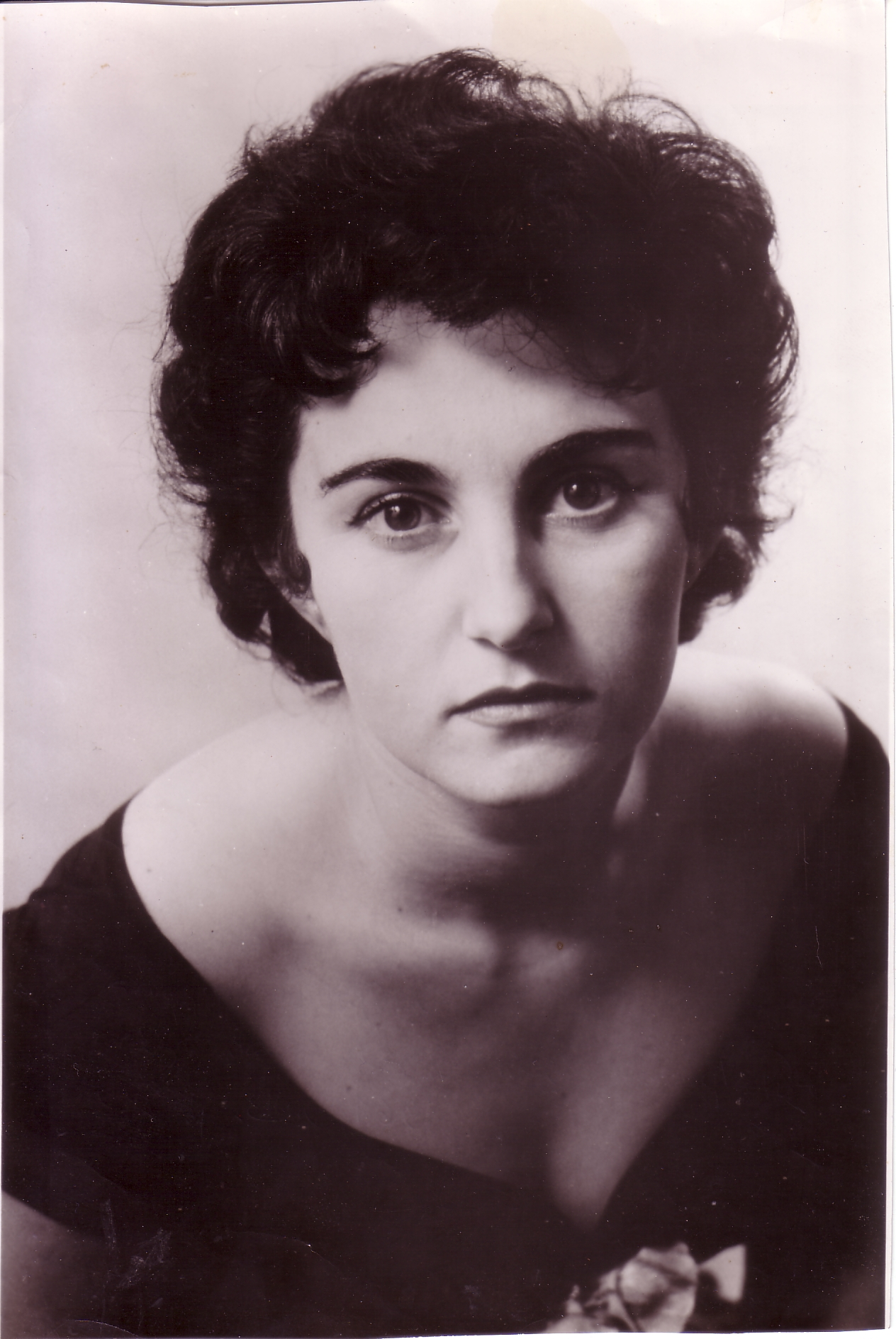
Pnina Gary in New York, 1953

From 1953 through 1957, Pnina Gary studied acting in New York, in the private schools of Herbert Berghof and Lee Strasberg, and took lessons in the Actors Studio. After their return to Israel, in 1959, she co-founded the Zavit Theater, which was active for nine years and among others produced Jean-Paul Sartre's "No Exit", featuring Gary herself. During those years, she also acted in various theater shows produced by other theaters in Tel Aviv.

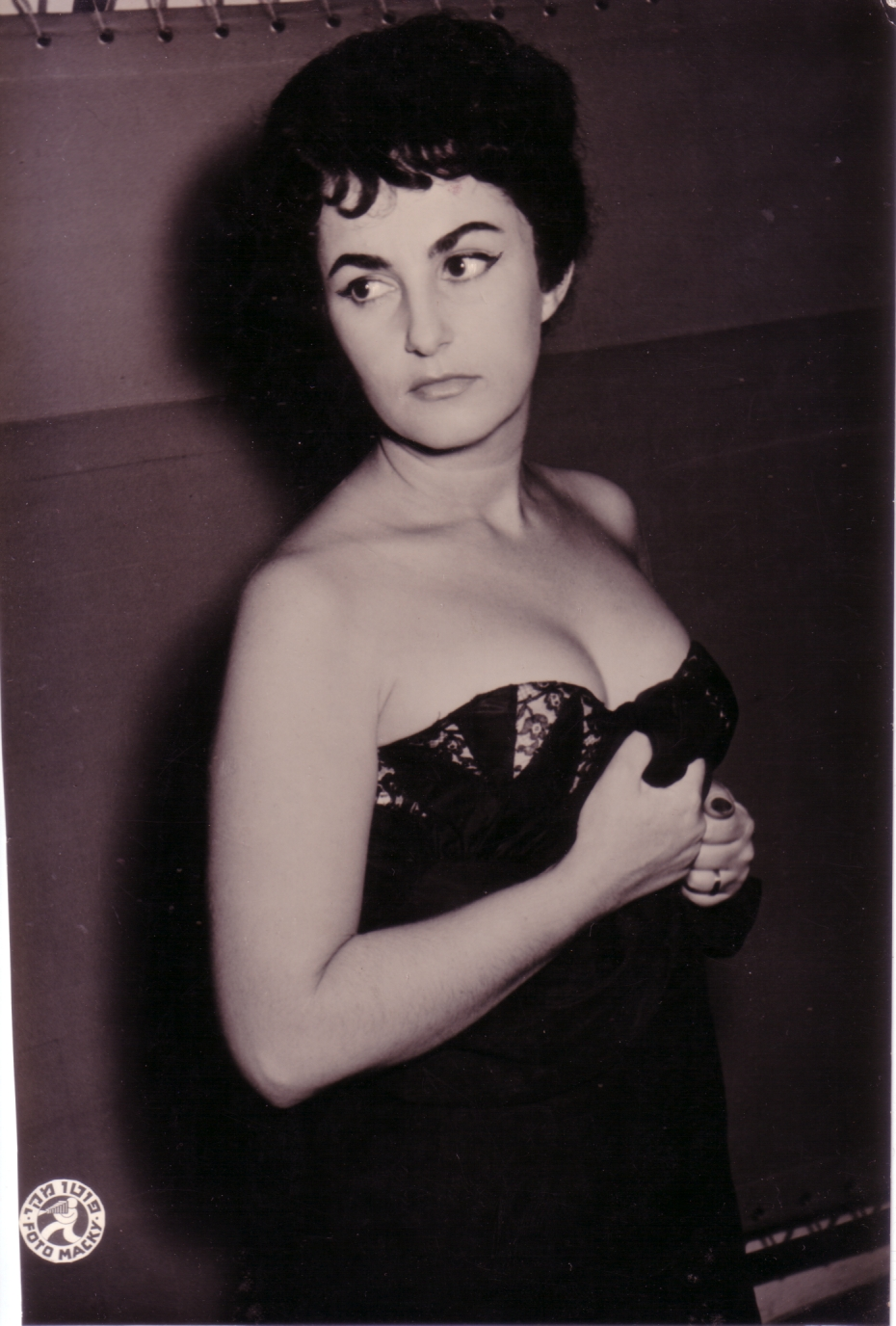
Pnina Gary as Estelle Rigault in "No Exit", Tel-Aviv 1958

In 1968, Gary joined HaBima as an actress, until 1980. From 1981 through 1990 she was the artistic director of the Orna Porat Theater. She adapted a number of novels to theater, by the most renowned Israeli novelists: Amos Oz, Sami Michael, Shulamit Lapid, Tzruya Shalev and Shmuel Yosef Agnon.

Pnina Gary's film appearances as an actress include: The Dock (1960), Dreams (1969), Death Has No Friends (1970), Ariana (1971) and the BBC's A Dinner of Herbs (1988).

In 2006, she received an award for her life's work from both the Israeli Ministry of Culture and Education and ASSITEJ.

In 2008, Gary wrote and directed the one-woman show An Israeli Love Story, based on her own true life story between 1942, when she first met Eli Ben-Zvi, and 1948, with the tragic ending of their relationship. The play is still performed by Adi Bielski, who won the Israeli Best Actress Award in Fringe Theater in 2009.

The play was translated to English and performed at The Leeds Jewish International Performing Arts Festival in 2009, at London's New End Theatre from May 18 to June 6, 2010, and at the National Arts Centre in Ottawa as well as Montreal, Toronto and Washington, D.C., in September 2011. The show was also performed in the Harold Green Jewish Theatre in Toronto in 2014.

In 2011, Gary directed "Tmol Shilshom" (Only Yesterday), the novel by Shmuel Yosef Agnon which she adapted to theatre, and in 2012 Gary staged "My Name is Yuda", a poetry theater show based on the poems of Yehuda Amichai, which also featured Adi Bielski.

In 2013, Gary directed in Paris the French production of "An Israeli Love Story" (in French) under the name Une histoire d'amour israélienne, played by French actress Estelle Grynszpan.

In 2015, Gary published an autobiographical novel in Hebrew under the same title as the Hebrew title of the monodrama "An Israeli Love Story". The book was published under Schocken Books.

In 2016, the Hebrew language film, Sipur Ahava Eretz-Israeli (An Israeli Love Story) was released, directed by Dan Wolman and starring Adi Bielski based on Gary's life's story and the monodrama by the same name.
