= Ben's Biography =

2003 film

- Directed by: Dan Wolman
- Written by: Dan Wolman
- Produced by: Dan Wolman
- Starring: Sharon Alexander
- Cinematography: Itamar Hadar
- Release date: 12 July 2003
- Running time: 105 minutes
- Country: Israel
- Language: Hebrew

Ben's Biography (Hebrew: Habiographia Shel Ben) is a 2003 Israeli comedy film directed by Dan Wolman. It was entered into the 26th Moscow International Film Festival.

== Cast ==
- Sharon Alexander
- Avigail Ariely
- Rivka Gur
- Ron Gur-Arieh
- Noa Kroll
- Amir Mograbi
- Tahel Ran
- Yossi Tal
- Geni Tamir
