= Nina Grosse =

German film director

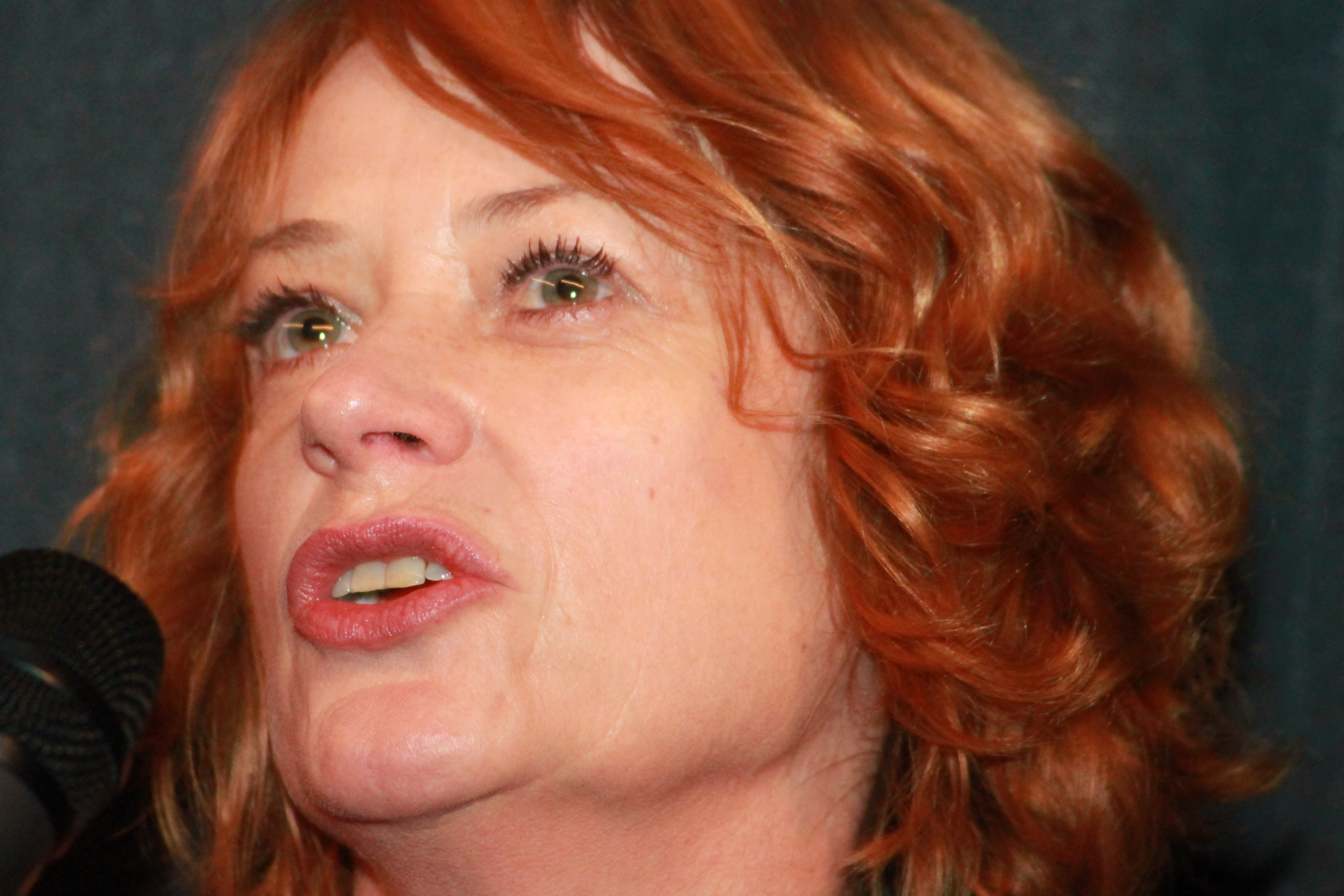
- Born: 11 August 1958 (age 67); Munich, West Germany
- Occupations: Film director, screenwriter
- Years active: 1983–present

Nina Grosse (born 11 August 1958) is a German film director and screenwriter. She has directed 14 films since 1983. Her 2004 film Olga's Summer was entered into the 26th Moscow International Film Festival.

== Selected filmography ==
- The Glass Sky (1987)
- Tote leben nicht allein (1990, TV film)
- Kinder der Nacht (1995, TV film)
- Rider of the Flames (1998)
- Olga's Summer (2004)
- Der verlorene Sohn (2009, TV film)
- The Weekend (2012)
- The Billionaire's Kiss (2014)
