= Abbey of Mount Tabor =

Coordinates: 32°41′10.0″N 35°23′34.1″E

The Abbey of Mount Tabor was a Benedictine monastery on the shrine of Christ's Transfiguration on Mount Tabor in the Kingdom of Jerusalem.

== Background ==
Christian tradition has identified Mount Tabor in Galilee as the site of the miraculous Transfiguration of Jesus. The historians Bernard Hamilton and Andrew Jotischky assumes that the first Christian church on the mountain was likely built during the reign of the first Christian Roman emperor Constantine the Great. According to the three Synoptic Gospels, Peter the Apostle suggested that three tabernacles were to be built at the site to commemorate the miracle, thus early medieval Christian literature often claimed that three churches had been built in the monastery. However, the pilgrim Willibald says that he found a single church when he visited Mount Tabor. Archaeological research also indicates the existence of one church, with the high altar dedicated to the Transfiguration, and two chapels to the prophets Moses and Elias.

== Establishment ==
Galilee was conquered by the Italo-Norman crusader Tancred after the crusaders captured Jerusalem during the First Crusade. The late 12th-century historian William of Tyre writes that Tancred established churches at the towns of Nazareth and Tiberias, and on Mount Tabor, and made magnanimous grants to them. Modern scholars, such as Hamilton and Denys Pringle say that the original Greek Orthodox monastery was seized by Roman Catholic monks with Tancred's support, and the Orthodox monks built a new monastery, dedicated to Saint Elias. As no bishoprics were established in Galilee, the new monastery's abbot was the highest-ranking prelate in the region. In 1109, the first abbot, Gerald received archiepiscopal authority over Galilee from Pope Paschal II who also exempted the abbey from all other prelates' jurisdiction.

== Abbots ==
- Gerald (1099–)
- Peter (c. 1120)
- William (c. 1138)
- Pons (c. 1146–1152)
- Bernard (c. 1163–1169)
- Garin (1169–c. 1180)
- John (c. 1180–)
- Andrew (c. 1220)
- P. (c. 1233)

== Sources ==
- Barber, Malcolm (2012). The Crusader States. Yale University Press. ISBN 978-0-300-11312-9.
- Hamilton, Bernard (2016) [1980]. The Latin Church in the Crusader States: The Secular Church. Routledge. ISBN 978-0-86078-072-4.
- Hamilton, Bernard; Jotischky, Andrew (2020). Latin and Greek Monasticism in the Crusader States. Cambridge University Press. ISBN 978-0-521-83638-8.
