= Harvest Time (film) =

2003 film

- Film poster
- Directed by: Marina Razbezhkina
- Written by: Marina Razbezhkina
- Produced by: Natalia Zheltukhina
- Starring: Lyudmila Motornaya
- Cinematography: Irina Uralskaya
- Release date: 26 June 2004
- Running time: 67 minutes
- Country: Russia
- Language: Russian

Harvest Time (Russian: Время жатвы, romanized: Vremya zhatvy) is a 2004 Russian drama film directed by Marina Razbezhkina. It was entered into the 26th Moscow International Film Festival.

== Plot ==
The film is set in a Chuvash village during the early 1950s. Antonina Guseva lives with her husband Gennadiy, a disabled war veteran, and two young sons, Vanya and Kolya. Narration (voice-over) is on behalf of Kolya. Antonina is the best combine operator of the district, and she is awarded with a transferable Red Banner (instead of the calico piece she desired). Mice spoil the banner, and Antonina has to not only continuously repair it, but also to win again in the Socialist emulation, so that the banner remains with her and the authorities do not notice the consequences of "diversionist activities" by the mice. Gennadiy becomes a drunkard and passes away.

The last scene is set in a city apartment of the times of perestroika. After the death of Antonina, who survived her sons, old furniture is taken out from the flat. On TV the film Guest from Kuban with a song about combine operators is transmitted. An unknown girl casually browses photos and things from the village house, which are about to go to the dump. She takes out a small piece of red velvet (everything that remains of the Red Banner), wraps her head with it and goes to the street.

Kolya's voice-over:

"You have abandoned our memory of you in such a way that you do not even return to our dreams"

— Gennady Aigi

== Cast ==
- Lyudmila Motornaya as Antonina
- Vyacheslav Batrakov as Gennadiy
- Dmitri Yakovlev as Vanya (as Dima Yakovlev)
- Dmitri Yermakov as Kolya (as Dima Yermakov)
- Sergei Starostin as Narrator (voice)
- Vika Vasilyeva (voice)
- Sainkho Namtchylak (voice)
- Dmitri Derduga as Vanya (voice) (as Dima Derduga)
- Mikhail Izotov as Kolya (voice) (as Misha Izotov)
- Svetlana Efremova as Singer
