= Hazardous and Unhealthy =

2003 film

- Directed by: Antonis Papadoupoulos
- Written by: Antonis Papadoupoulos
- Produced by: Kostas Lambropoulos
- Starring: Paschalis Tsarouhas
- Cinematography: Polidefkis Kirlidis
- Release date: 25 November 2003
- Running time: 93 minutes
- Country: Greece
- Language: Greek

Hazardous and Unhealthy (Greek: Varea anthygieina) is a 2003 Greek drama film directed by Antonis Papadoupoulos. It was entered into the 26th Moscow International Film Festival.

== Plot ==
An old guerrilla of the Greek Resistance arrives at a small village, where he had done a heroic act during occupation of Greece, thirty years ago. There, he discovers that the villagers considered him as dead and honoured him as hero. His arrival upsets the residents, because many lies could be disclosed.

== Cast ==
- Paschalis Tsarouhas
- Nena Menti
- Antonis Antoniou
- Regina Pantelidi
- Nikos Zoiopoulos
- Yannis Zouganelis
