= Earth's Skin =

2004 film

- Directed by: Manuel Fernandez
- Written by: Manuel Fernandez
- Produced by: Carlos Conde
- Starring: Pilar Barrera
- Cinematography: Pablo Hernández Smith
- Release date: 22 June 2004 (Moscow)
- Running time: 97 minutes
- Country: Spain
- Language: Spanish

Earth's Skin (Spanish: La piel de la tierra) is a 2004 Spanish drama film directed by Manuel Fernandez. It was entered into the 26th Moscow International Film Festival.

== Cast ==
- Pilar Barrera
- Manuel de Blas as Mateo el enterrador
- Carmen del Valle as María
- Manuel Galiana as Salatiel
- Sergio Peris-Mencheta as Pablo
