= Dan Wolman =

Israeli filmmaker and lecturer in film studies

- דן וולמן
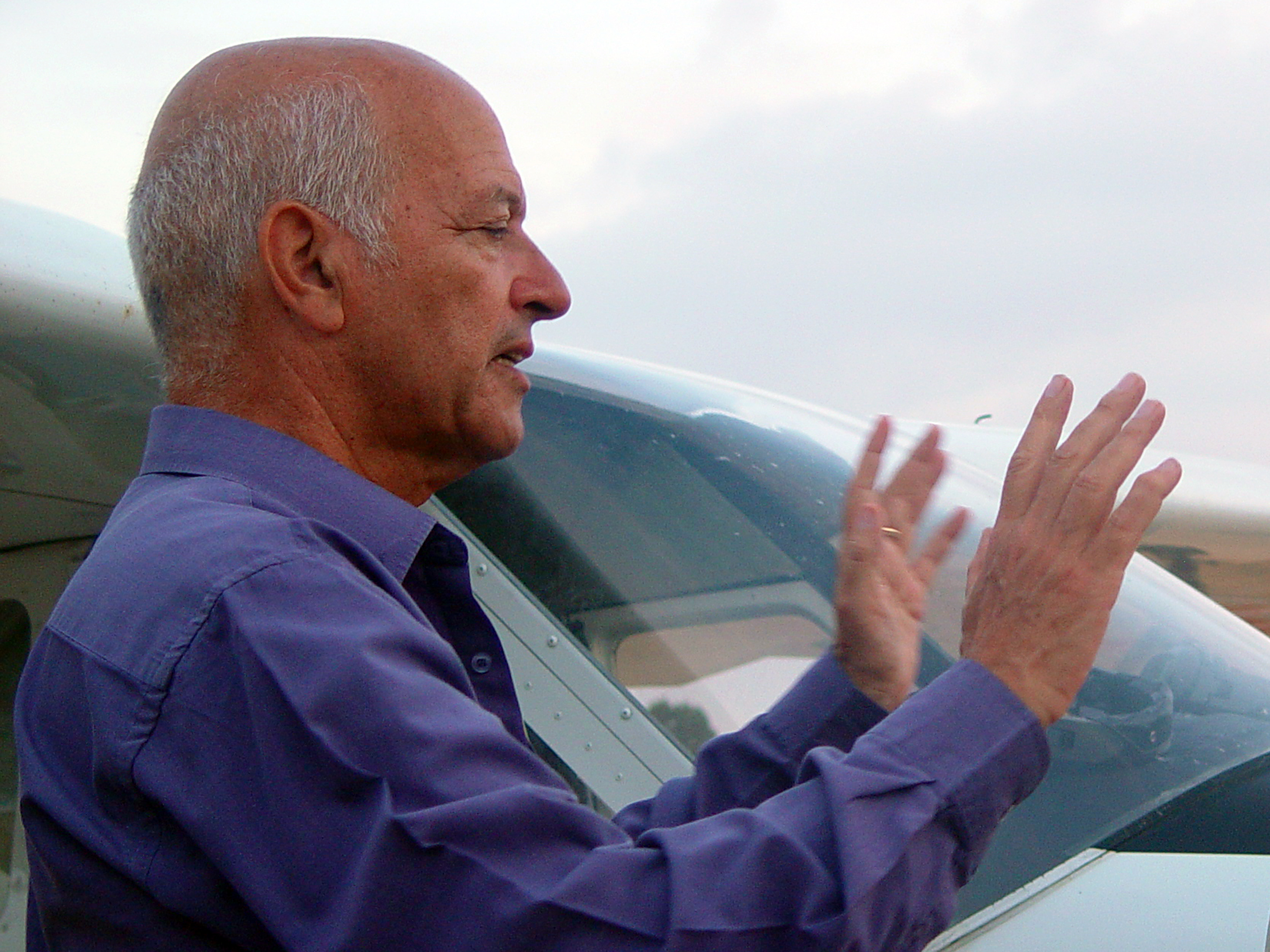
- Dan Wolman, 2008
- Born: 28 October 1941 (age 85); Jerusalem
- Occupation: Film director

Dan Wolman (Hebrew: דן וולמן; born October 28, 1941) is an Israeli filmmaker and lecturer in film studies.

== Biography ==
Dan Wolman was born in Jerusalem, in what was then Mandatory Palestine. He spent part of his childhood in Ethiopia, where his father, Professor Moshe Wolman, served as personal physician to Emperor Haile Selassie. In 1960, after completing high school, Wolman was posted to Safed as part of his military service in the Nahal brigade, where he founded the "HaAri" Scout troop. His connection to Safed was reflected in several of his works. In 1967, he filmed and directed a documentary about the city, and in 1970 he wrote and directed The Dreamer, a feature film set in Safed, which represented Israel in the official competition at the 1970 Cannes Film Festival.

Wolman studied filmmaking at the City College of New York from 1962 to 1965 and at New York University's film department from 1965 to 1968. He also holds a bachelor's degree in education.

== Academic and film career ==
In 1974 and 1978, Wolman taught at the School of Visual Arts and at New York University. In 1981 he taught screenwriting and production at Tel Aviv University. Wolman has been a judge in several international and Israeli film festivals.

One of Wolman's central themes is the nuclear family. Examples are My Michael, the screen adaptation of Amos Oz's book about a married couple, and Foreign Sister, which deals with an Israeli bourgeois family that takes in a foreign worker from Ethiopia.

== Awards and recognition ==
Wolman received a Lifetime Achievement Award at the Jerusalem Film Festival and the Silver Hugo award at the Chicago International Film Festival for his "unique vision and innovative work." In January 2015, he was awarded the Arik Einstein prize for his achievements and contribution to Israeli cinema and culture. In 2016, he won the Ophir Lifetime Achievement Award of the Israeli Film Academy. He was honoured with the Lifetime Achievement Award at India's International Film festival of India IFFI in Goa in 2018.

In September 2026, Wolman received the Lifetime Achievement Award (Premio alla Carriera) at the Lakes Noir International Film Festival in Luino, Italy.

== Filmography ==
- 2025 – Murders Too Close – Love Too Far, an Indo-Israeli thriller co-directed by Dan Wolman and Indian filmmaker Manju Borah. The film was selected for the 2026 Lakes Noir International Film Festival in Italy.
- 2022 “Judas” (Hebrew “Habsora al pi Yehuda”), Inspired by a book by Amos Oz, starring Yuval Livni, Einav Merkel and Doron Tavori. Presented in Haifa International Film Festival, and the Jerusalem Jewish Film Festival.
- 2016 "Sipur Ahava Eretz-Israeli", inspired by the monodrama "An Israeli Love Story" based on the life's story of Pnina Gary, starring Adi Bielski. released in Israel 2017, presented in festivals the world over.
- 2016 "Hide and Seek" presented at the Panorama Teddy Award in the Berlin International Film Festival.
- 2016 "Loving Eyes" a documentary about Israeli still photographer Werner Braun.
- 2015 "The Director's Angst" Goa, IFFI India, PILSEN – Jerusalem days.
- 2010 "Gei Oni" (Valley of Strength) based on Shulamit Lapid's novel – Winner of Best feature film at New Delhi International Film Festival Film. Wins "Special Jury Award" at Mediash Rumania Central European Film Festival, winner of "Best Foreign Film" by an audience at Golden Rooster – One Hundred flower Film Festival" in Hei-Fe China.
- 2010 "Yolande An Unsung Heroine" – a documentary. "Spy Museum" Washington, Lincoln Center New York Jewish Film Festival.
- 2007 "Tied Hands" wins Award for Best Feature Film and Best Performance in a feature film (Gila Almagor) at Palm Beach International Film Festival.
- 2007 Ben's Biography Platinum Mori Award Houston Worldfest, entered into the 26th Moscow International Film Festival.
- 2006 "Tied Hands" presented at the Jerusalem International Film Festival. The film wins special prize for Gila Almagor's performance.
- 2006 "Ben's Biography" wins at FARO Mediterranean Film Festival "Best Film" (Audience choice), and Best actor (Gal Zaid).
- 2004 "Ben's Biography". In competition Moscow International Film Festival. New Delhi film Festival and numerous other festivals.
- 2001 "Treasures of the Red Sea" (A children's film produced, written and directed for "Yoram Globus Production").
- 2001 "Foreign Sister" receives "A special recognition Award" at The Berlin Black Film Festival.
- 2000 "Foreign Sister" Winner of The "Volgin" Award for best film at the Jerusalem International Film Festival.
- 1999 Receives "Lifetime achievement award" at Jerusalem International Film Festival.
- 1994 "The Distance" wins the Wolgin Award for best film at the Jerusalem International Film Festival.
- 1992 "Silver Hugo" award at the Chicago International Film Festival "for unique vision and innovative work…".
- 1985 Soldier of The Night Presented at Montpelier Film Festival, Sardinia and many others.
- 1983 Nana, the True Key of Pleasure
- 1983 Baby Love
- 1980 Hide and Seek Presented at the Berlin International Film Festival. It won in Israel "The Silver Rose" Award for Best film, Best director and Best script .
- 1975 My Michael Screenplay by Wolman and Ester Mor, based on the novel By Amos Oz. The film won the "David Lyre" Award for Best film, Best director and Best script. Israeli critics choice for best film.
- 1972 Floch (Written in collaboration with Hanoch Levine) in competition at Venice Film Festival.
- 1970 The Dreamer. In competition at the 1970 Cannes Film Festival.

=== Television dramas ===
- 1976 "The Story of Bash" based on short story by Isaac Bashevis Singer. Won The Best Television Drama of the Year by Israel's Broadcasting Authority.
- 1977 "Gimpel the Fool" Based on a short story by Bashevis Singer. Competed in the Italian Television competition.
- 1988 "Stempenyu" based on the first novel of Sholem Aleichem. Competed in Italia Television contest.
- 1992 "Mivchan Magen" based on a script by Aliza Olmert.
- 1993 "Scape Goat" a two-part mini series based on a novel by Eli Amir.
- 1999 "Protected Species" for Reshet production.

=== Short films ===
- 1965 "The Living" – Winner of best film, best director and best editor prizes at the American Photographic Society of America film festival.
- 1966 "Habit" (Written by Lan Okun), Cin’e award, Golden Eagle award. A.F.I. Film Festival.
- 1968 "The Race", "The Golden Eagle Award" at cin'e competition.
- 1968 "The Gospel" winner of The Kingsly Award for best film of the year at N.Y.U. film festival.
- 1978 "The National Poet" (Based on a radio drama by Hanoch Levine).

=== Documentaries ===
- 2023 "The children of Sally Bein", about the institution for Jewish children with special needs, that was active in Beelitz, Germany, from 1908-1942, and its manager Sally Bein.
- 1968 "Saffed". 1970 "Men of the Holly Mountain" (about the Samaritans). 1978 "To touch a city" – Jerusalem.
- 1981 "Big days small stories" 1991 "Mosaic" the story of Beit She'an.
- 1997 "Reuven Shiloah". 1999 "Yolande". 2001 " Yitzhak Sade"
- 2007 "Spoken with Love" official selection "DocAviv" film festival

=== Theater ===
- 1982 "Bells in Jerusalem" Khan theater in Jerusalem.
- 1983 "She wasn’t there". Written in collaboration with Blanka Metsner "Tzavta" theater.
- 1991 "Ben’s Biography". Presented at "Theaterneto" in Tel Aviv, Edinburgh theater Festival, "Village Gate" New York.
- 1995 "The Operation" Festival for Alternate Theater
- 2003 "Last Curtain in Damascus"
- 2004 "Yadja" (by Blanca Metzner and Dan Wolman) opened in Paris. Later that year "Yadja" was presented at the Avignon Theater Festival
- 2006 "The Lit Darkness". Presented at Tzavta Theater

== See also ==
- Cinema of Israel
