= Shibli–Umm al-Ghanam =

Shibli–Umm al-Ghanam: שִׁבְּלִי-אֻם אל-ג'נַם; الشبلي - أم الغنم
- Local council (from 1992)

Hebrew transcription(s)
  - ISO 259: Šibbli - ʔumm ˀel-Gánem (Israeli pronunciation)
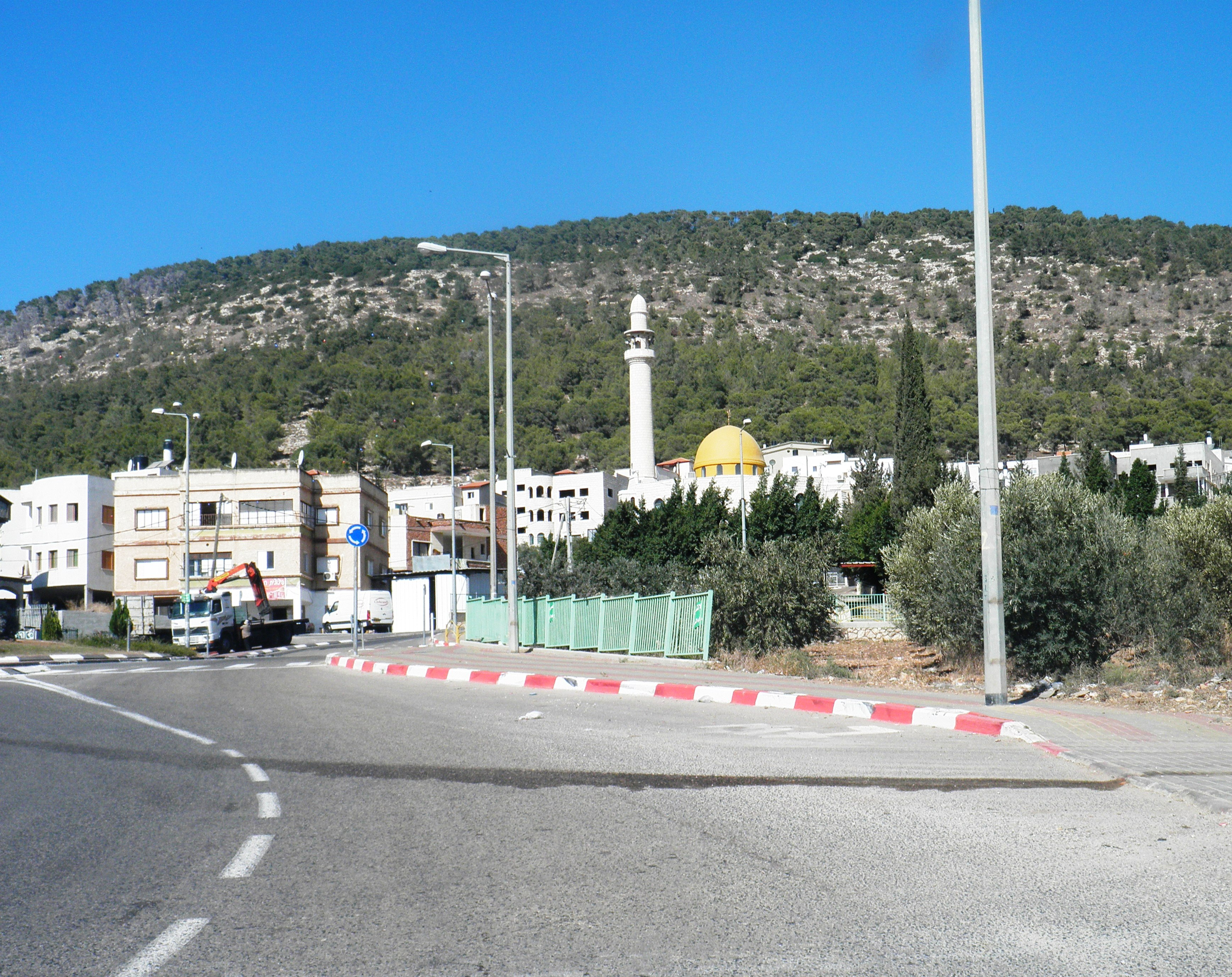
- View of Shibli

- Location within Northeast Israel Location within Israel
- Coordinates: 32°41′03″N 35°23′49″E
- Grid position: 186/231 PAL
- Country: Israel
- District: Northern
- Subdistrict: Jezreel
- Natural Region: Nazareth-Tir'an Mountains
- Founded: 1992

Area
  - Total: 2,879 dunams (2.879 km^{2}; 1.112 sq mi)

Population (2024)
  - Total: 6,476
  - Density: 2,249/km^{2} (5,826/sq mi)
- Name meaning: Khirbet Umm el Ghanem = The ruin with the sheep

Shibli–Umm al-Ghanam (Arabic: الشبلي - أم الغنم, Hebrew: שִׁבְּלִי-אֻם אל-ג'נַם) is an Arab Bedouin town at the foot of Mount Tabor in Israel's Northern District. Originally called Arab al-Subayh (عرب الصبيح), In 2024 it had a population of 6,476.

== History ==
Archaeological excavations east of the village have revealed flint from the Mousterian culture, several knapped using the Levallois technique.

Ceramics from the Byzantine era have been found here.

=== Ottoman era ===
In 1517, the village was included in the Ottoman Empire with the rest of Palestine, and in the 1596 tax-records it appeared as Um al-Ganam, located in the Nahiya of Tabariyya, part of Safad Sanjak. The population was 8 households, all Muslim. They paid a fixed tax-rate of 25% on agricultural products, including wheat, barley and summer crops, in addition to occasional revenues, and goats and beehives; a total of 1,910 akçe.

In 1875, Victor Guérin found here "several ancient cisterns, still unbroken, and ancient caves cut in rock, which now serve as refuge for shepherds." In 1881 the Palestine Exploration Fund's Survey of Western Palestine found at Kh. Umm el Ghanem: "Heaps of stones, a few of which are hewn, all of small size, one small cave and one cistern."

=== British Mandate era ===
In the 1922 census of Palestine conducted by the British Mandate authorities, Umm al Ghanam had a population of 52, all Muslims. In the 1931 census the population of Umm al-Ghanam was counted with that of Reineh, together they had 1015 inhabitants in a total of 243 houses.

In the 1945 statistics the population of Umm al-Ghanam was counted with that of Mount Tabor, and their total land area was 8,409 dunams, according to an official land and population survey. Of this, 232 dunams were allocated for plantations and irrigable land, 6,215 for cereals, while a total of 1,962 dunams were classified as non-cultivable land.

=== State of Israel ===
In March 2024, thousands of documents from the 1948 war were discovered in Tel Aviv after being discarded near a residential building. Among operational files and internal political documents was a written order dated July 1948 and titled “Conduct in Occupied Villages with Population”. With regard to Arab al-Subayh, the order stated that no trace was to remain and that “every Arab of the Subayh must be killed.” The article reporting the discovery emphasized that the directive was written and signed, rather than conveyed orally.

The town was formed in 1992 as a result of a municipal merger of the villages of Shibli and Umm al-Ghanam.

Shibli High School is attended by 270 Arab students, Special educational programs introduced at the school have boosted the Bagrut matriculation pass rate and percentage of graduates attending university.

== Demographics ==
Historical population
| Year | Pop. | ±% |
|---|---|---|
| 1983 | 1,800 | — |
| 1995 | 2,300 | +27.8% |
| 2008 | 4,900 | +113.0% |
| 2022 | 6,278 | +28.1% |
| 2024 | 6,476 | +3.2% |

In 2022, 100% of the population was Muslim.

== Jordan Lead Codices ==
The so-called Jordan Lead Codices are considered by Israeli and Jordanian specialists to be fakes.

Hassan Saida of Shibli–Umm Al-Ghanam owns a collection of small cast lead books featuring what is believed to be the first-ever portrait of Jesus. The books are thought to have been created by followers of Jesus in the first decades after his crucifixion. The books, containing cryptic messages in Hebrew and ancient Greek, have been in Saida's family since they were found by his great-grandfather.

== Voting Patterns ==
In the 2022 election, 92 percent of voters in Shibli–Umm al-Ghanam voted for the Arab parties, while 5 percent voted for the parties of the center-left coalition led by Yair Lapid and 2 percent voted for the parties of the right-wing coalition led by Benjamin Netanyahu. Among the voters for the Arab parties, 74 percent voted for Ra'am, while 14 percent voted for the Hadash–Ta'al list and 12 percent voted for Balad.

In the 2026 election, 94 percent of voters in Shibli–Umm al-Ghanam voted for the Arab parties, while 5 percent voted for the parties of the center-left coalition led by Gadi Eisenkot and 0.4 percent voted for the parties of the right-wing coalition led by Benjamin Netanyahu. Among the voters for the Arab parties, 70 percent voted for Ra'am, while 30 percent voted for the Joint List. Voter turnout increased 73 percent from the 2022 election.

== See also ==
- Arab localities in Israel

== Bibliography ==
- Barron, J.B., ed. (1923). Palestine: Report and General Abstracts of the Census of 1922. Government of Palestine.
- Conder, C.R.; Kitchener, H.H. (1881). The Survey of Western Palestine: Memoirs of the Topography, Orography, Hydrography, and Archaeology. Vol. 1. London: Committee of the Palestine Exploration Fund.
- Dauphin, C. (1998). La Palestine byzantine, Peuplement et Populations. BAR International Series 726 (in French). Vol. III : Catalogue. Oxford: Archeopress. ISBN 0-860549-05-4.
- Government of Palestine, Department of Statistics (1945). Village Statistics, April, 1945.
- Guérin, V. (1880). Description Géographique Historique et Archéologique de la Palestine (in French). Vol. 3: Galilee, pt. 1. Paris: L'Imprimerie Nationale.
- Hadawi, S. (1970). Village Statistics of 1945: A Classification of Land and Area ownership in Palestine. Palestine Liberation Organization Research Center.
- Hütteroth, W.-D.; Abdulfattah, K. (1977). Historical Geography of Palestine, Transjordan and Southern Syria in the Late 16th Century. Erlanger Geographische Arbeiten, Sonderband 5. Erlangen, Germany: Vorstand der Fränkischen Geographischen Gesellschaft. ISBN 3-920405-41-2.
- Mills, E., ed. (1932). Census of Palestine 1931. Population of Villages, Towns and Administrative Areas. Jerusalem: Government of Palestine.
- Palmer, E.H. (1881). The Survey of Western Palestine: Arabic and English Name Lists Collected During the Survey by Lieutenants Conder and Kitchener, R. E. Transliterated and Explained by E.H. Palmer. Committee of the Palestine Exploration Fund.
- Rhode, H. (1979). Administration and Population of the Sancak of Safed in the Sixteenth Century. Columbia University. Archived from the original on 1 March 2020.
- Tepper, Y. (2 March 2015). "'Ein Umm el-Ghanam" (127). Hadashot Arkheologiyot – Excavations and Surveys in Israel.
