= Olga's Summer =

2002 film

- Film poster
- German: Olgas Sommer
- Directed by: Nina Grosse
- Written by: Nina Grosse
- Starring: Clémence Poésy
- Cinematography: Benedict Neuenfels
- Release date: 26 January 2004 (Saarbrücken)
- Running time: 105 minutes
- Country: Germany
- Language: German

Olga's Summer (German: Olgas Sommer) is a 2004 German drama film directed by Nina Grosse. It was entered into the 26th Moscow International Film Festival.

== Cast ==
- Clémence Poésy as Olga
- Bruno Todeschini as Daniel Sax
- Katja Flint as Caroline Sax
- Sebastian Blomberg as Franc
- Sunnyi Melles as Ella
- Wotan Wilke Möhring as Paul
- Hanns Zischler as Richard
