= Mount Tabor =

Mountain in northern Israel

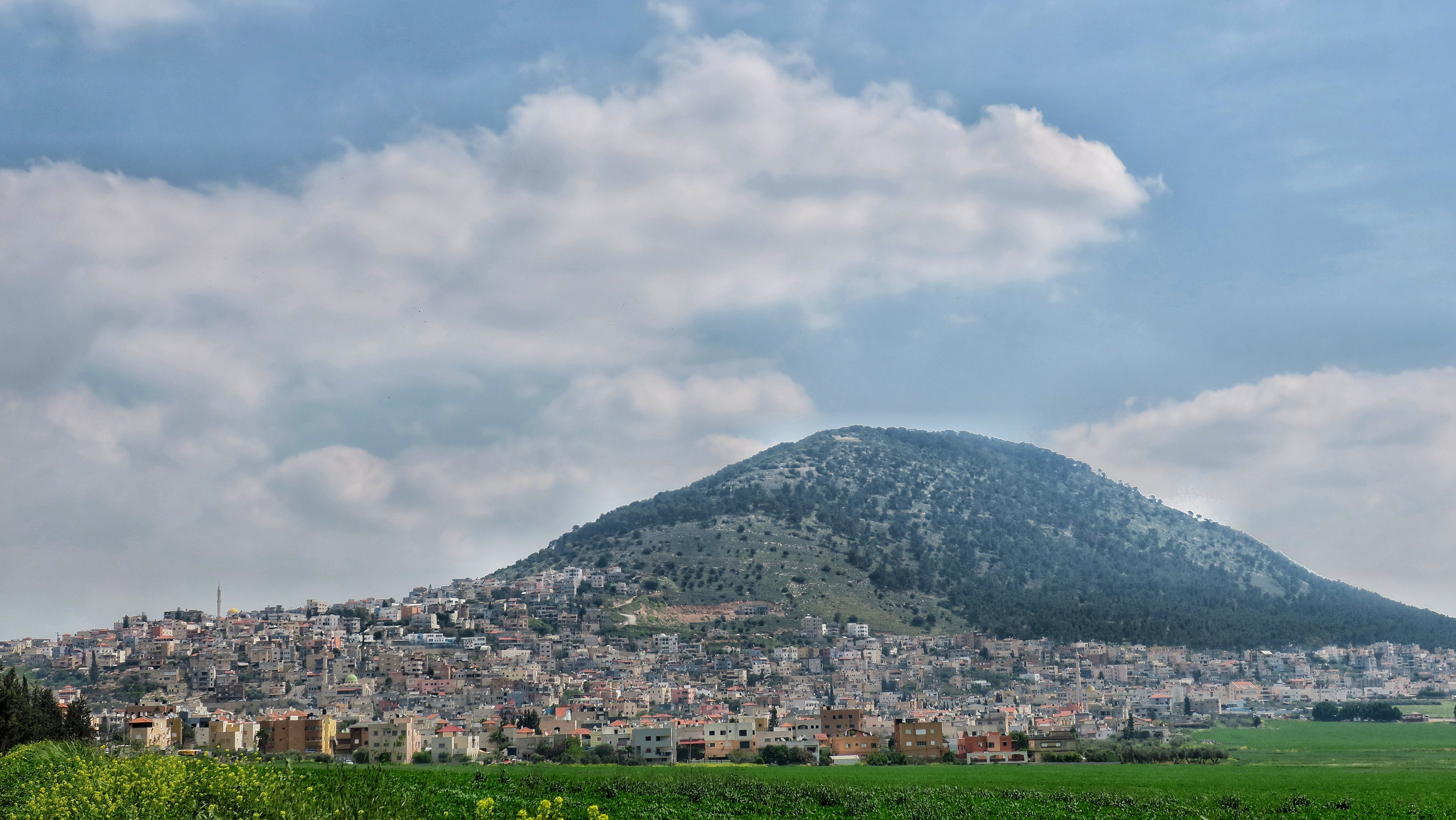

Highest point
- Elevation: 575 m (1,886 ft)
- Coordinates: 32°41′14″N 35°23′25″E

Geography
- Location within Israel
- Location: Lower Galilee, Israel

Mount Tabor (/ˈtʌbər/; Hebrew: הַר תָּבוֹר, romanized: Har Tavor; Arabic: جبل طابور, romanized: Jabal Ṭābūr), sometimes spelled Mount Thabor, is a large hill of biblical significance in the Lower Galilee, Israel, at the eastern end of the Jezreel Valley, 18 kilometres (11 miles) west of the Sea of Galilee.

In the Hebrew Bible (Joshua, Judges), Mount Tabor is the site of the battle of Mount Tabor between the Israelite army under the leadership of Barak and the army of the Canaanite king of Hazor, Jabin, commanded by Sisera.

Mount Tabor is one of the mountains traditionally identified as the site of the Transfiguration of Jesus.

== Etymology ==
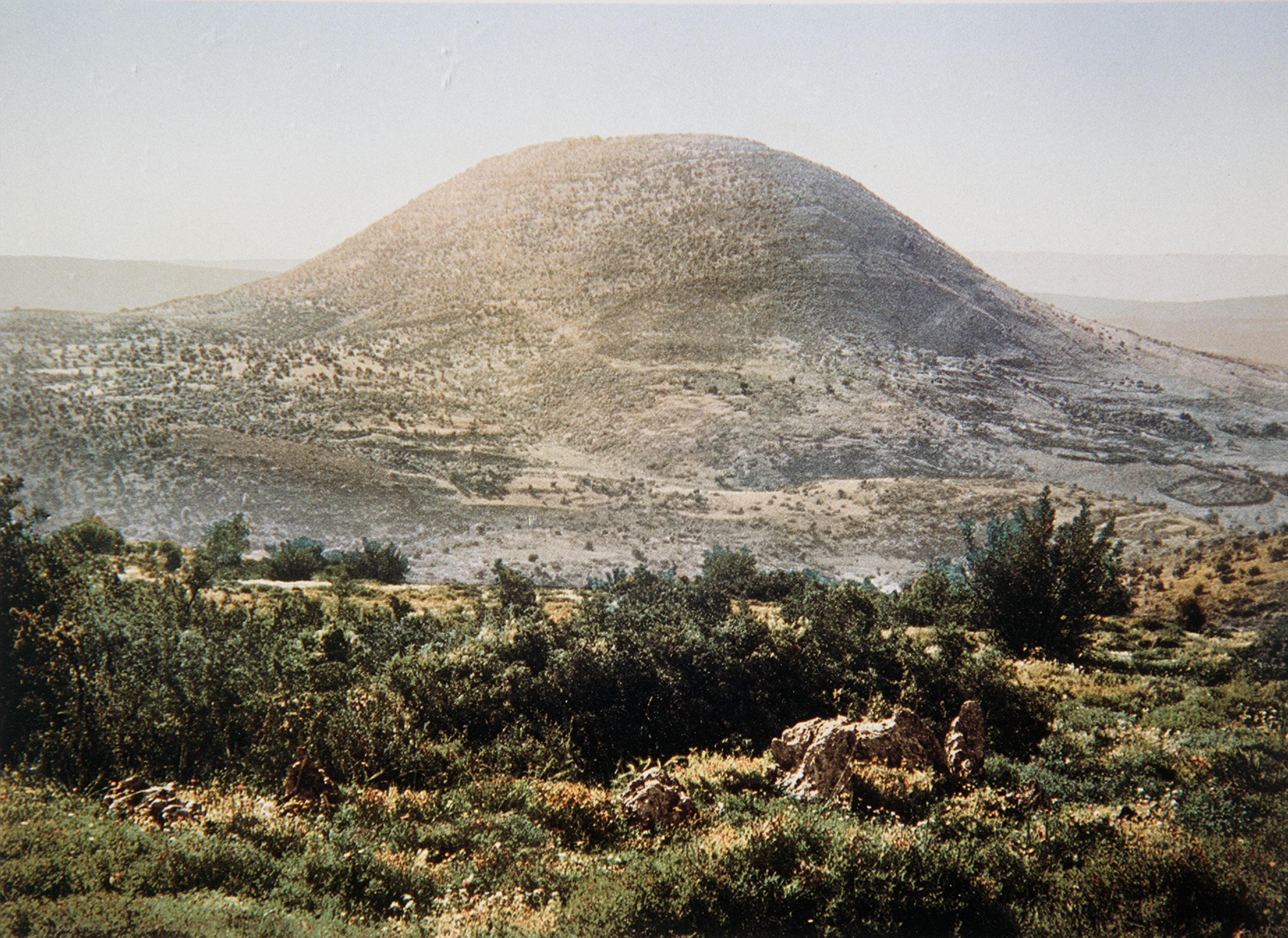
Mt. Tabor, 19th century

The Hebrew name of the mountain, תבור tabor, has long been connected with the name for "navel", טבור ṭabbur, but this is probably due to popular etymology.

In the Greek Septuagint's translation of the Book of Jeremiah, the name Itabyrium (Ἰταβύριον, Itabýrion) was used for Mount Tabor. Josephus used the same name in his Greek works.

In connection with the Transfiguration of Jesus, the mountain has been known in the past as the Mount of Transfiguration or Mount of the Transfiguration. It was the namesake of Tabor Light in Christian theology, of the Czech sect of the Taborites, and of numerous other settlements and institutions.

The Arabic form of the name is "Mount Tabur" (جبل طابور, Jebel Ṭābūr) or "Mount Tur" (جبل الطور, Jebel eṭ-Ṭūr). The name Jabal aṭ-Ṭūr is shared with Sinai and Mount Gerizim.

== Geography ==
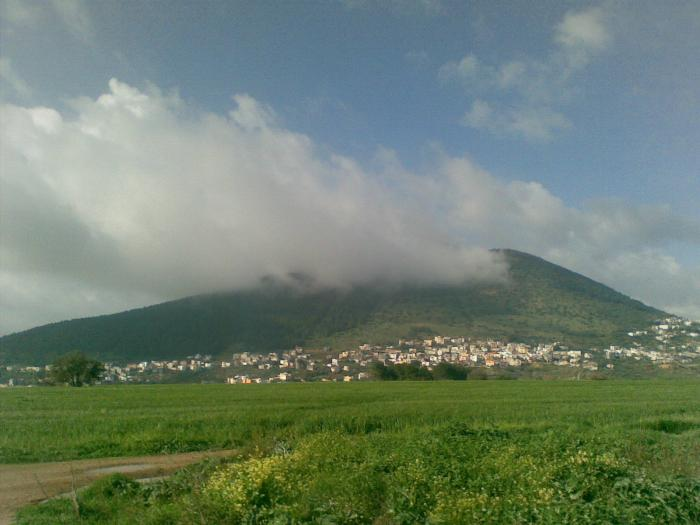
Mount Tabor covered with cloud

Mount Tabor is shaped almost like half a sphere, suddenly rising from rather flat surroundings and reaching a height of 575 metres (1,886 feet), thus dominating by a good 450 metres the town in the plain below, Kfar Tavor. At the top of the mountain are two Christian monasteries, one Catholic on the southeast side and one Greek Orthodox on the northeast side. The Catholic church at the top is easily visible from afar.

The mountain is a monadnock: an isolated hill or small mountain rising abruptly from gently sloping or level surrounding land, and is not volcanic. In spite of its proximity to the Nazareth mountains, it constitutes a separate geological form.

At the base it is almost fully surrounded by the Arab villages of Daburiyya, Shibli, and Umm al-Ghanam. Mount Tabor is located off Highway 65, and its summit is accessible by road via Shibli. A hiking tracks starts from the Bedouin village Shibli and is about five kilometers long. It is part of the Israel National Trail.

== History ==
At the bottom of the mountain was an important road junction: Via Maris passed there from the Jezreel Valley northward towards Damascus. Its location on the road junction and its bulgy formation above its environment gave Mount Tabor a strategic value and wars were conducted in its area in different periods in history.

=== Hebrew Bible ===
The mountain is mentioned for the first time in the Hebrew Bible, in Joshua 19:22, as border of three tribes: Zebulun, Issachar and Naphtali. The mountain's importance stems from its strategic control of the junction of the Galilee's north–south route with the east–west highway of the Jezreel Valley.

According to the Book of Judges, Hazor was the seat of Jabin, the king of Canaan, whose commander, Sisera, led a Canaanite army against the Israelites. Deborah the Jewish prophetess summoned Barak of the tribe of Naphtali and gave him God's command, "Go and draw toward mount Tabor, and take with thee ten thousand men of the children of Naphtali and of the children of Zebulun" (Judges 4:6). Descending from the mountain, the Israelites attacked and vanquished Sisera and the Canaanites.

=== Second Temple period ===
In the Second Temple period (c. 516 BCE – 70 CE), Mount Tabor was one of the mountain peaks on which it was the custom to light beacons in order to inform the northern villages of Jewish holy days and of the beginning of new months.

=== Roman period ===
In 55 BCE, during a Hasmonean rebellion against the Roman proconsul of Syria, Aulus Gabinius, Alexander of Judaea and his army of 30,000 Judeans was defeated in battle at Mount Tabor. As many as 10,000 Jewish fighters were killed in the battle and Alexander was forced to flee, apparently to Syria.

In 66 CE, during the First Jewish-Roman War, the Galilean Jews retrenched on the mountain under the command of Yosef Ben Matityahu, better known as Josephus Flavius, the later historian, whence they defended themselves against the Roman assault. Itabyrium, as Josephus calls it, was one of the 19 sites fortified by the rebels in Galilee under his very orders. According to what is written in his book The Wars of the Jews, Vespasian sent an army of 600 riders, under the command of Placidus, who fought the rebels. Placidus understood that he could not reach the top of the steep mountain with his forces, and therefore called the fortified rebels to walk down the mountain. A group of Jewish rebels descended from the mountain, supposedly, in order to negotiate with Placidus, but they attacked him. The Roman forces initially retreated, but while they were in the valley, they returned towards the mountain, attacked the Jewish rebels, killed many of them, and blocked the road for the remaining rebels who tried to flee back to the top of the mountain. Many of the Jewish rebels left Mount Tabor and returned to Jerusalem. The rest of the fortified rebels in the fortress on the mountain surrendered after their water ran out. They then handed over the mountain to Placidus.

After the destruction of the Second Temple, Jewish settlement on Mount Tabor was renewed.

==== Transfiguration of Jesus ====
Of the New Testament, the gospels relate that Jesus brought Peter, James, and his brother John onto a high mountain, and that Jesus became radiant there. However, none of these accounts identifies the "high mountain" of the scene by name. The earliest identification of the Mount of Transfiguration as Tabor is by Origen in the 3rd century. This early speculation is recounted by St. Cyril of Jerusalem and St. Jerome in the 4th century. It is later recounted in the 5th-century Transitus Beatae Mariae Virginis. The identification has been doubted in 19th-century scholarship (Henry Alford 1868, John Lightfoot 1825).

=== Byzantine period ===
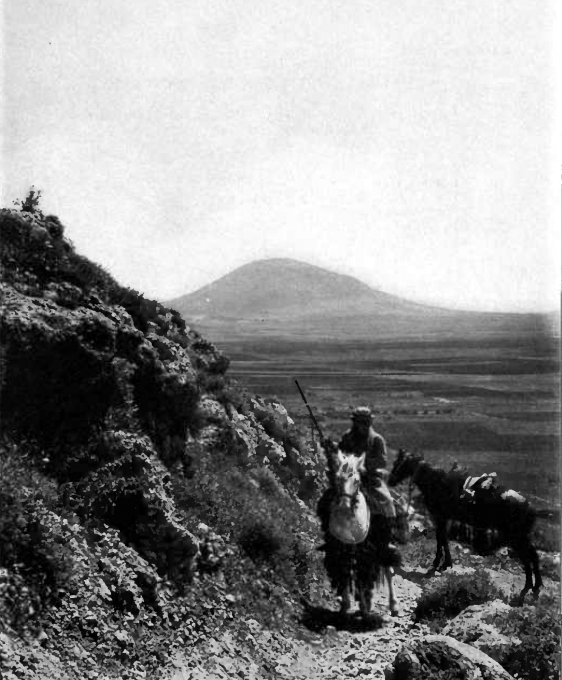
Mount Tabor, 1912

Due to the importance of Mount Tabor in Christian tradition, from the 4th century onward it became a pilgrimage site. According to descriptions of the pilgrims, during the 6th century there were three churches on the top of the mountain.

=== Early Muslim period ===
During the 8th century there were four churches and a monastery on the mountain. During the Arab Caliphate period, in 949, a battle occurred on Mount Tabor between different factions over the control of Palestine on behalf of the Abbasid Caliphate.

=== Crusader, Ayyubid, and Mamluk periods ===
During the period of the Crusades, the mountain changed hands many times between Muslims and Christians. In 1099 the Crusaders fortified the area of the monastery which was on the peak of the mountain, in order to protect the pilgrims from Muslim attacks. In 1101, when Crusaders controlled the area, the Benedictine monks rebuilt a ruined basilica and erected a fortified abbey. In 1212 the mountain was occupied by the Ayyubid Sultan Al-Adil I who built a large fortress at its top, which was unsuccessfully besieged by the armies of the Fifth Crusade in 1217, but in 1229 it was again occupied by the Christians. In 1263, the Mamluk ruler Baibars occupied the fortress and destroyed the buildings on the mountain.

=== Ottoman period ===
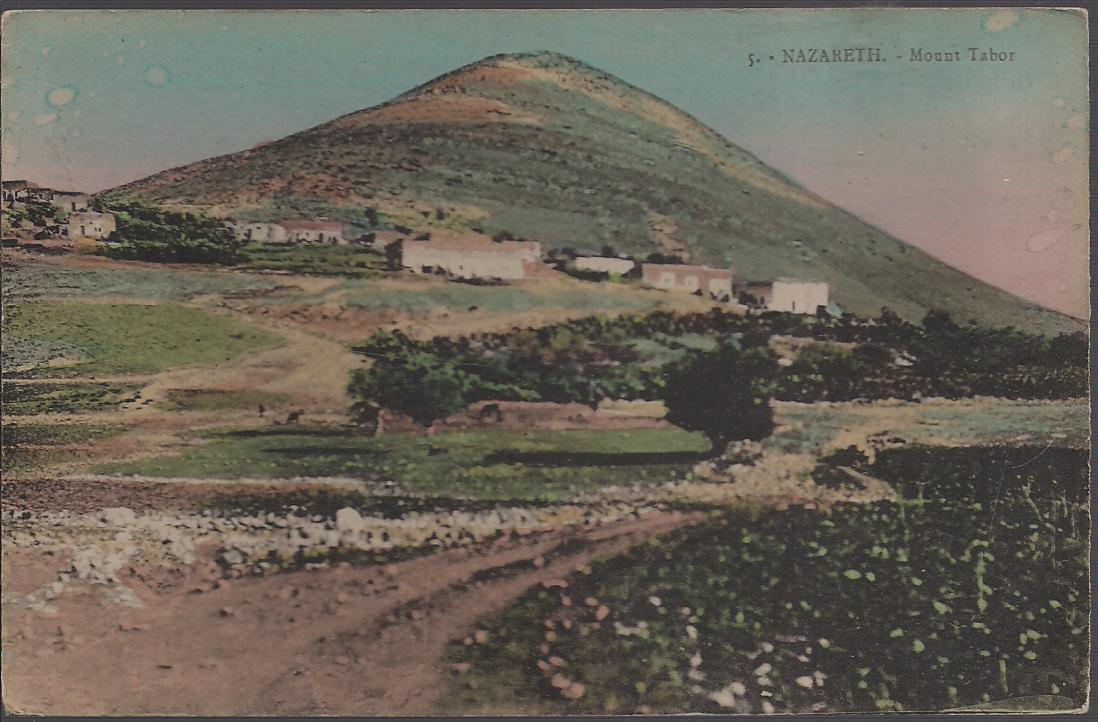
ca 1925 photo postcard, by Karimeh Abbud

In 1799, during the time of Napoleon Bonaparte's Syrian expedition, in the valley between Mount Tabor and the Hill of Moreh, the Battle of Mount Tabor was fought in which a French force of about 3,000 soldiers under the command of Napoleon and general Kléber won against an Ottoman force of about 35,000 soldiers.

Jews lived in rural villages in the area in the mid-19th century, where they farmed the land.

At the end of the 19th and the beginning the 20th century, the Bedouin tribe Arab Al-Sabehi settled on the mountain. It was one of the strongest tribes in that region.

=== State of Israel ===
During the 1948 Arab–Israeli War members from the Arab Al-Sabehi tribe joined the Arab Liberation Army of Fawzi al-Qawuqji and amongst others killed seven members of Kibbutz Beit Keshet. At the start of May 1948 the Golani Brigade occupied Mount Tabor. Most members of the tribe were forced out to Syria and to the Kingdom of Jordan, except for one branch of the tribe, the clan of Shibli, whose members refused to leave their land. After the war their village was established, Arab Al-Shibli, which is nowadays part of the village Shibli-Umm al-Ghanam. The Bedouin village was admitted as a tourist village by the Israeli government.

Many tribes in the region, like Arab-Al Hieb, began their military cooperation with the Jewish underground forces before the establishment of the state, in the late 1930s. Since the late 1960s many of the tribesmen joined the Israeli security forces (such as IDF, Border Police and police).

In April each year, the Lower Galilee Regional Council holds a 12-kilometre race around Mount Tabor in memory of Yitzhak Sadeh, the first commander of the Palmach, one of the founders of the Israel Defense Forces at the time of the establishment of the State and a promoter of mass sport.

== Landmarks ==
=== Church of the Transfiguration ===
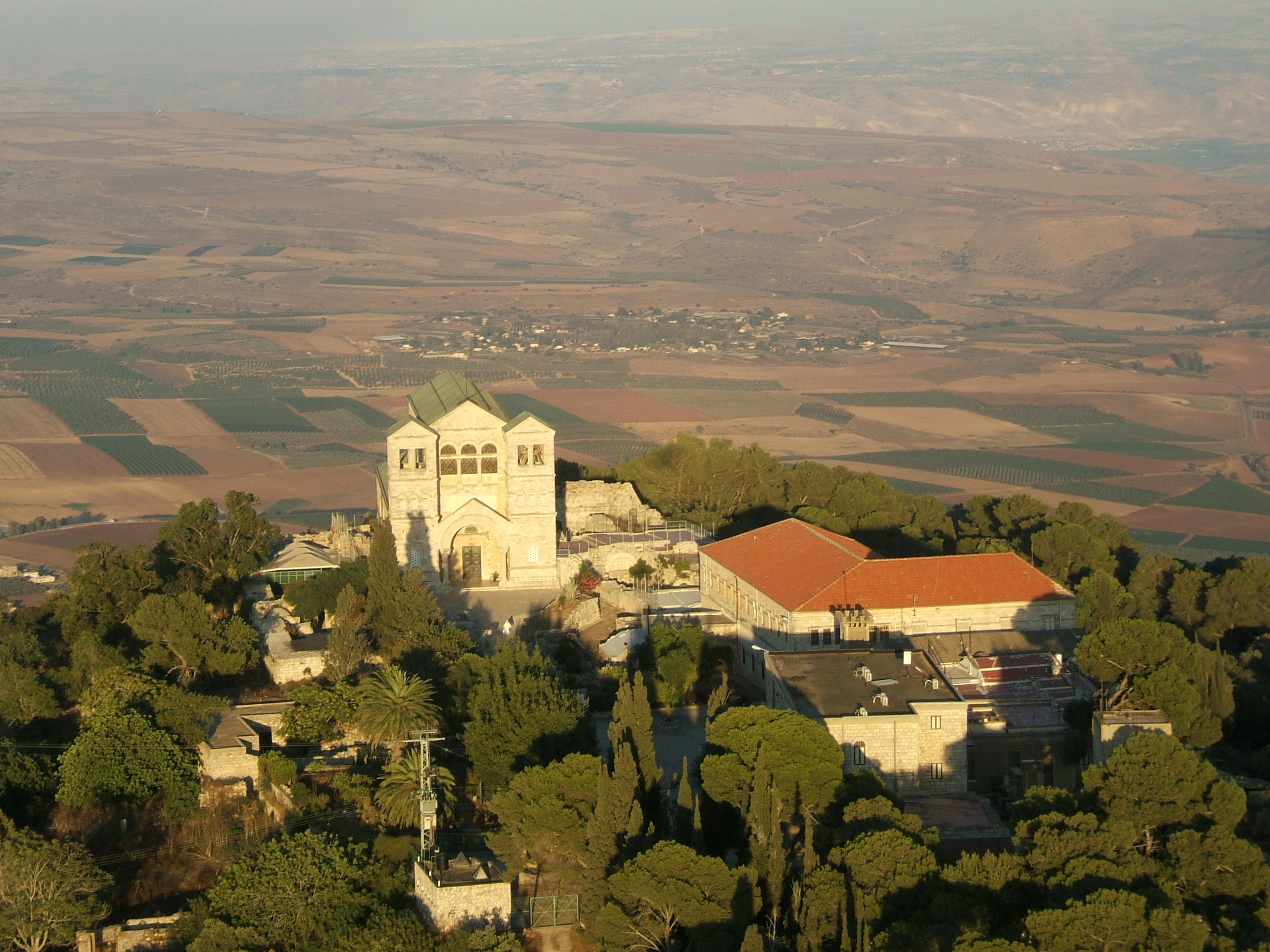
Aerial view of the Church of Transfiguration at the summit, which is divided into Catholic (southeast) areas and Eastern Orthodox (northeast)

Between 1919 and 1924 a Catholic church of the Franciscan order named "Church of the Transfiguration" was built on the peak of Mount Tabor. The architect who designed the church was Antonio Barluzzi. The church was built upon the ruins of a Byzantine church from the fifth or sixth century and a Crusader church from the 12th century. In the upper part of the church, above the altar, is a mosaic which depicts the Transfiguration. On the Feast of the Transfiguration, celebrated on August 6, it is illuminated by sunbeams which are reflected by a glass plate on the floor of the church. A rock near the entrance of the church has an engraving in ancient Greek and beside it there is an engraving of a cross. Nearby there are the remains of the 12th-century Benedictine abbey.

=== Greek Orthodox monastery ===
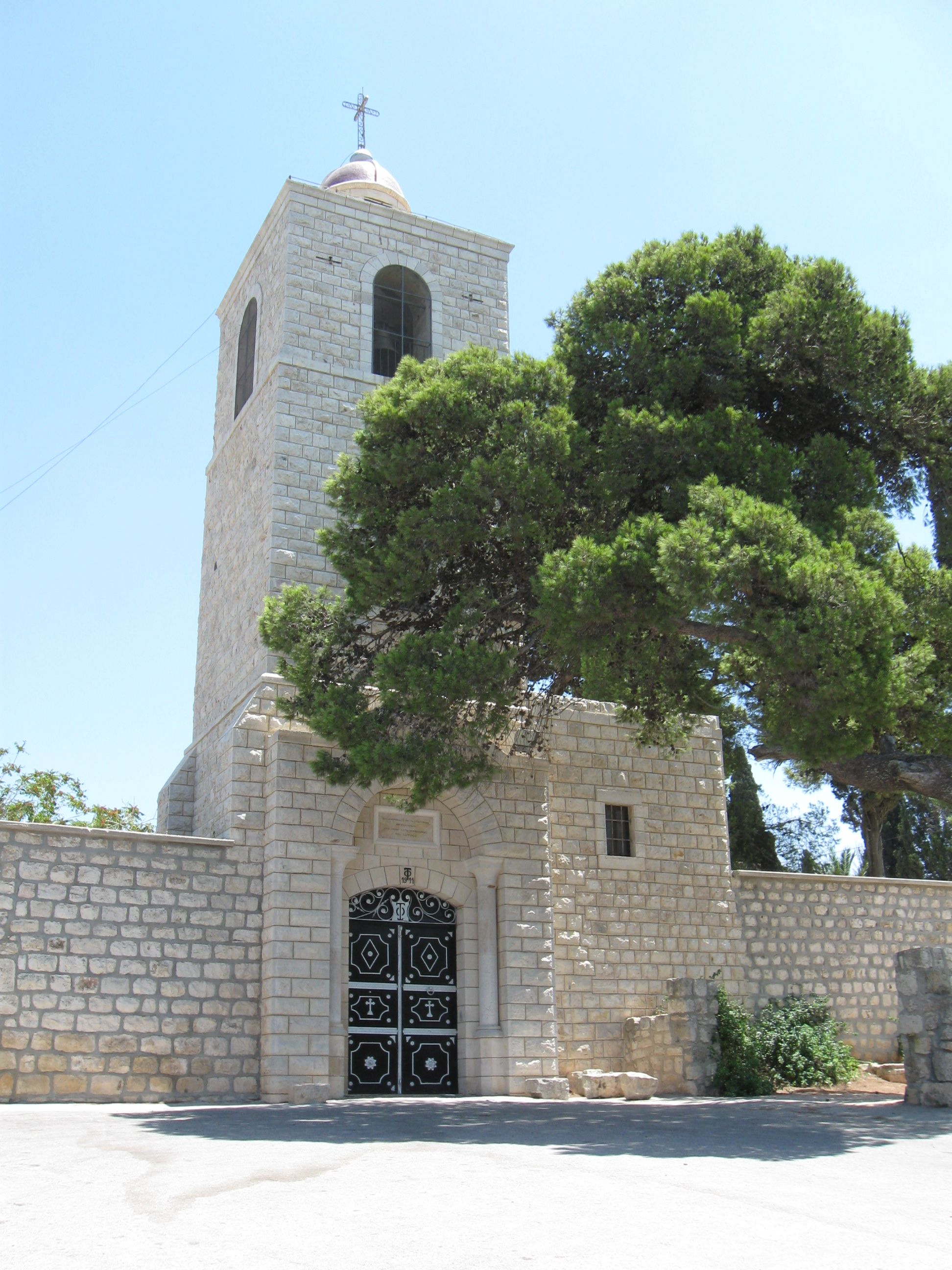
Bell tower of the Eastern Orthodox monastery.

The main church of the Greek Orthodox monastery is dedicated to the Transfiguration. The construction was started by a Romanian monk, Irinarh Rosetti, in 1859, the year of his death, and finished by his disciple, Nectarie Banul, in 1862. Northeast of the Church of the Transfiguration is the Church of the Prophet Elijah.

Northwest of the main church is a small cave-church named after Melchizedek, the King of Salem. According to the Christian tradition, this cave was the place where Abraham met the king of Salem. The cave was known to pilgrims and local Christians during the Middle Ages. An all-night vigil is held at the church every year on the Orthodox Feast of the Transfiguration on August 19 (which corresponds to August 6 according to the Julian Calendar).

=== Al-Tujjar Caravansarai ===
The ruins of the al-Tujjar Caravansarai are located on the slopes of Mount Tabor, opposite the entrance to Beit Keshet. The caravanserai was established by Grand Vizier Sinan Pasha around 1581. The reason given for its establishment was that the place was insecure for merchants and people making pilgrimage, and it was argued that if a khan was built, the place would become "inhabited and cultivated."

== Flora and fauna ==
Mount Tabor was covered with vegetation typical of northern Ancient Israel until the reign of the Ottoman Empire, during which period most of the trees were felled. The trees were felled for use in the charcoal industry. As part of the Jewish National Fund's efforts to recreate the landscapes of the country, during the 1960s and 1970s the area was reforested with trees which are similar to its original vegetation. Today, most of Mount Tabor is covered with trees such as Mount Tabor Oak (Quercus ithaburensis) and Palestine oak (Quercus calliprinos). Up to 400 plant species have been found on the Mount including large yellow crocuses (Sternbergia clusiana), the Persian lily (Fritillaria persica) rain-bells flowers (Muscari parviflorum), black-eyed red tulips (Tulipa agenensis), orchids, irises (including Iris haynei) and yellow asphodel (Asphodeline lutea), spontaneous barley (Hordeum spontaneum), Mt. Tabor larkspur, a rather rare perennial grass with blue spring flowers (Delphinium ithaburense), sweet cicely (Myrrhoides nodosa), a very rare plant of the family Umbelliferae, Galilean alkanet (Alkanna galilaea) and parsley-piert (Aphanes arvensis).

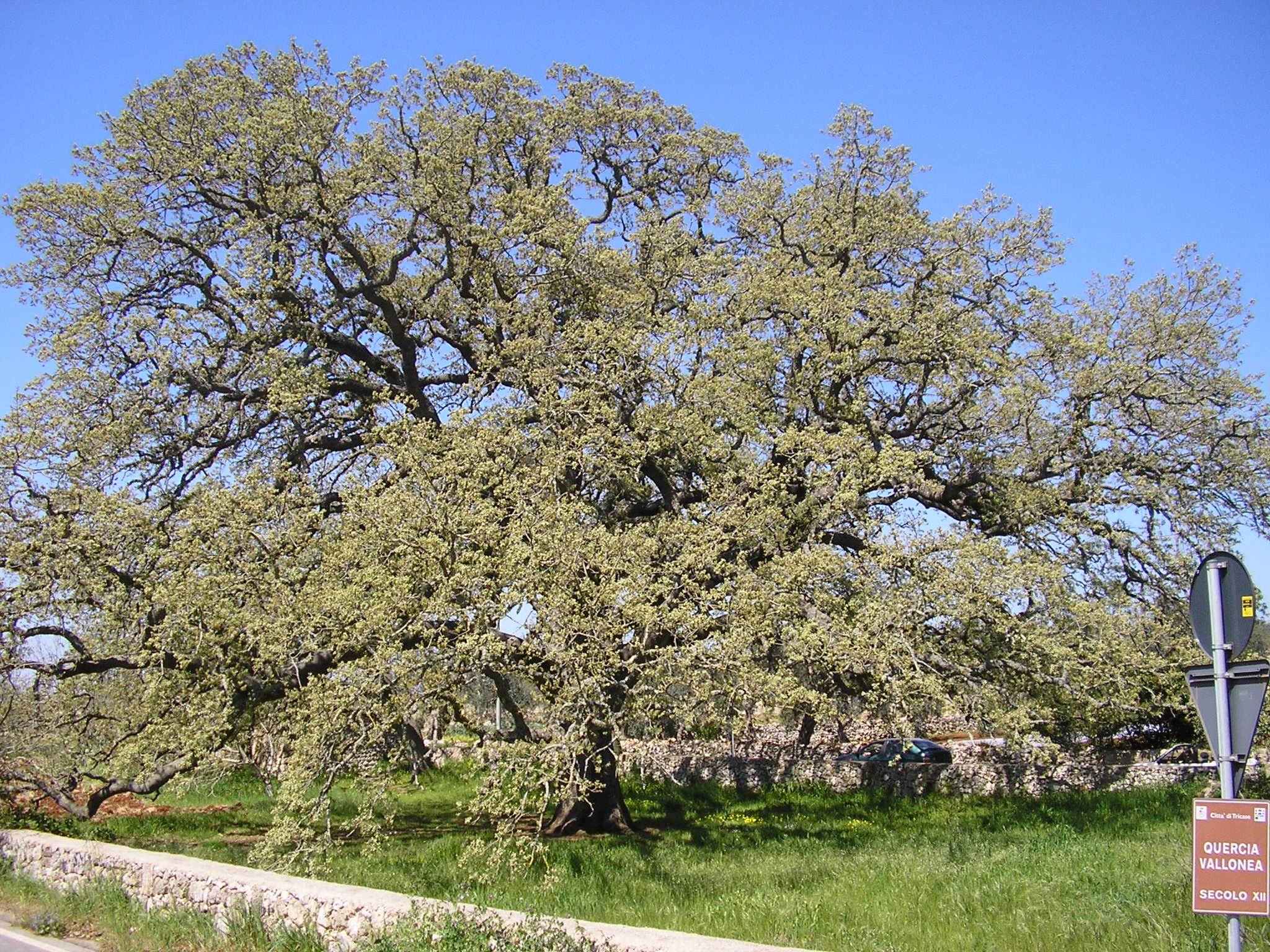
Mount Tabor oak

The woodland vegetation provides a habitat for wolves and jackals, foxes, porcupines, hyraxes, mongooses and the broad-toothed field mouse (Apodemus mysticanus). In a cave at the top of the Mount, long-fingered bats (Myotis capaccini), can be found roosting. Various reptiles can also be found including; the Greek tortoise (Testudo graeca), the hardun lizard (Laudakia stellio), the Lebanon lizard (Phoenicolacerta laevi) and the red whip snake (Platyceps collaris). The woodland is also a good habitat for various birds including jays (Garrulus), Syrian woodpeckers (Dendrocopos syriacus), Sardinian warblers (Curruca melanocephala), Eurasian hobbies (Falco subbuteo), great tits (Parus major), great spotted cuckoos (Clamator glandarius) and snake eagles (Circaetus).

== See also ==
- Jebel Quruntul, the Mount of Temptation
- Tábor was founded by the Hussites in 1420 and named after the bibical Mount Tabor.
