= René Reinumägi =

Estonian film director and actor

- Born: 21 July 1974 (age 50); Tallinn, Estonia
- Occupation(s): Film director, actor, screenwriter
- Awards: Moscow Film Festival 2004 / Special Juri Prize Silver St. George; Feature “Sigade Revolutsioon” (Engl. “Revolution of Pigs”): Golden Egg 1999, Bronze / Copywriter, Director; Golden Hammer 1999, Gold / Copywriter, Director; Lonely Wolf / ISDN, a commercial Estonian Telephone Company /AS AGE Reklaam: Golden Hammer 2001, Silver / Copywriter, director; “What do you know about Estonia…”, commercial Estonian Telephone Company / Age: GOLDEN EGG 2001 SOCIAL ADVERTISING; “Agricultural Census 2001”, commercial / Creative director, director Statistical Office of Estonia / Age: Golden Egg 2001 Silver / Creative director, director; Golden Hammer 2002 Gold; C.I.F.A 2001 in GEORGIA, BRONZE; “Frederik”, a commercial Viru Õlu / Up Front / Age: Golden Hammer 2002 Silver / Creative director, director; “Business line”, a commercial Estonian Telephone Company / Age

René Reinumägi (born 21 July 1974, in Tallinn) is an Estonian film director, scriptwriter and actor. With Jaak Kilmi he shares nomination for Grand Prix Asturias at the Gijón International Film Festival, nomination for Golden St. George and the winning of Special Jury Prize at the 26th Moscow International Film Festival in 2004.

== Filmography ==
- 2003 Director of the youth film Sigade Revolutsioon (Engl. “Revolution of Pigs”), OÜ Sigade Revolutsioon
- 2002 Screenwriter for the youth film Sigade revolutsioon (Engl. “Revolution of Pigs”), OÜ Sigade Revolutsioon
- 1999 actor and co-writer of the short feature film Inimkaamera (Engl. “Human Camera”), Rudolf Konimois Film, director Jaak Kilmi
- 1999 actor and co-writer of the short feature film Tähesôit (Engl. “Star Ride”), Exitfilm, director Jaak Kilmi
- 1998 actor in the short feature film Libarebased ja kooljad (Engl. “Werefoxes and Undead”), Eesti Telefilm, TPÜ Film-Video, director Rainer Sarnet
- 1998 actor and co-writer of the short feature film Külla tuli (Engl. “Came to Visit”), Eesti Telefilm, TPÜ Film-Video, director Jaak Kilmi

The film was awarded Grand Prix at Poitier International Student Film Festival in 1998 (France); special prize at Premiers Plans Film Festival in Angers in 1999 (France); main prize in Oberhausen Short Film Festival in 1999 (Germany), Wunderkind Award at See-Süchte Film Festival in Potsdam-Babelsberg in 1999 (Germany) and jury’s special Prize in Stuttgart – Ludwigsburg in 1999 (Germany)

- 1998 actor in short feature film McCulloc, director Marko Raat
