= Revolution of Pigs =

2004 film directed by Jaak Kilmi and René Reinumägi

- Directed by: René Reinumägi; Jaak Kilmi
- Written by: René Reinumägi; Jaak Kilmi
- Produced by: Anu Veermäe
- Starring: Jass Seljamaa; Uku Uusberg; Lilian Alto; Arvo Kukumägi
- Cinematography: Arko Okk
- Edited by: Lauri Laasik
- Music by: Leslie Laasner, Rein Rannap
- Distributed by: Internetcinema; Sigade revolutsioon OÜ; AS MPDE Eesti
- Release date: 18 March 2004
- Running time: 98 minutes
- Country: Estonia
- Language: Estonian

The Revolution of Pigs (Estonian: Sigade revolutsioon) is a 2004 Estonian comedy film that was a feature film debut for two young Estonian directors René Reinumägi and Jaak Kilmi. Fueled by a great soundtrack of classic ‘80s pop, the revolution is brewing. Set in the summer of 1986, hundreds of teenagers have gathered in the woods for Estonian student summer camp—three days full of adventures, falling in love and partying. But, when the teens are forced to comply with rules of proper behavior, camp in a totalitarian system is not all it is cracked up to be. The political metaphor of the counselors’ control leads to an uprising of the students. The main character is 16-year-old Tanel, who initially is as focused on losing his virginity and getting drunk as overthrowing the system. But taking part in the revolt, he discovers himself.

== Cast ==
- Jass Seljamaa - Tanel
- Evelin Kuusik - Diana
- Lilian Alto - Päike
- Uku Uusberg - Urmas
- Vadim Albrant - Futu
- Mikk Tammepõld- Erki
- Merle Liivak - Mariann
- Merli Rosar - Juta
- Tarvo Kaspar Toome - Punk rocker Timo
- Martin Mill - Ats
- Anu Saagim - Meierei
- Peeter Tammearu - Erki's father
- Tõnu Tepandi - Komandör
- Tõnu Oja - Operator
- Anne Paluver - Staabi mutt
- Arvo Kukumägi - Vuntsidega Komandör
- Üllar Saaremäe - Commander of Hundissaare

Awards
Preceded by The Nekst	Special Jury Prize Silver St. George; 26th Moscow International Film Festival (For film that could show the past but represent the future)	Succeeded by Bad Land
Preceded by	KULKA Award for Best Motion Picture; BEST FILM OF YEAR 2004	Succeeded by Vanameeste paradiis
