= Khan al-Tujjar (Mount Tabor) =

Ruins of a caravanserai in the Lower Galilee, Israel

- [خان التجار ] [חַנוֹת תָגַרִים] Khanot Tagarim
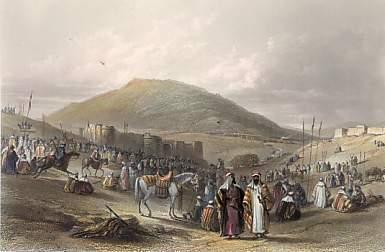
- A fair at Khan al-Tujjar around 1850, by W. H. Bartlett
- Former names: Khan al-Tujjar (in Arabic)
- Alternative names: The Merchant's Caravansary Suq al-Khan

General information
- Type: Caravanserai
- Architectural style: Ottoman
- Location: Mount Tabor, Israel
- Coordinates: 32°43′17.46″N 35°24′40.67″E
- Palestine grid: 187/236
- Completed: 1581

Khan al-Tujjar (Heb: חַנוֹת תָגַרִים Khanot Tagarim), lit. "Merchant's Caravanserai", also called Suq al-Khan, was a caravanserai in the Lower Galilee, Israel, opposite the entrance to Beit Keshet, now in ruins.

== History ==
The khan or caravanserai was established near Mount Tabor by Albanian-Ottoman Grand Vizier Sinan Pasha around 1581. The reason given for its establishment was that the place was insecure for merchants and people on pilgrimage, and it was argued that if a khan was built, the place would become "inhabited and cultivated."

The Turkish traveler Evliya Çelebi visited in 1649. He reported that:

"It is a square, perfect fortress, built of masonry in the midst of a large, verdant meadow. It has a circumference of six hundred paces. The garrison consists of a warden and 150 men. It has a 'double' iron gate facing north. Inside the fortress are between forty and fifty rooms for the garrison. ... Inside the fortress is the Mosque of Sinan Pasha, an artistically constructed work, with a lead roof, full of light. Its windows have light blue glass enamel fixed symmetrically with rock crystal and crystal(?). It measures eighty feet each side. The sanctuary has three graceful and lofty minarets—Praise be to the Creator, as if they were three young coquettish muezzins—and seven high domes. The wayfarers are lavishly given a loaf of bread and a tallow candle for each person, and a nosebag of barley for each horse—free of charge. On either side of the fortress is a caravanserai with eight shops."

In the early 18th century there was one period where the area seemed deserted, and there was no weekly marked. However, Western travellers still noted two buildings, one with a mosque and bath inside, and one which had been used for goods and cattle.

In the early 1760s the Italian traveller Mariti visited the khan, and wrote that:

"...you arrive at El-Net-Tesgiar, or the Place of Merchants. I was very much struck with the elegance and magnificence of its walls. Incrusted with the most beautiful marble, which the hand of art has disposed with much taste [..] El-Net-Tesgiar is enlivened by a very flourishing commerce. A fair is held here every Monday, which is resorted to by merchants from various countries. It is well furnished with cloth, cattle, and provisions of every kind; and in this respect it is, indeed, not inferior to the richest markets in Europe.

Pierre Jacotin marked the place as Kan Ouioun el Touggar on his map from 1799. James Silk Buckingham visited the place in around 1816, and described how, on a Monday, they found four to five thousand people assembled around the Khan, in addition to numerous herds of cattle.

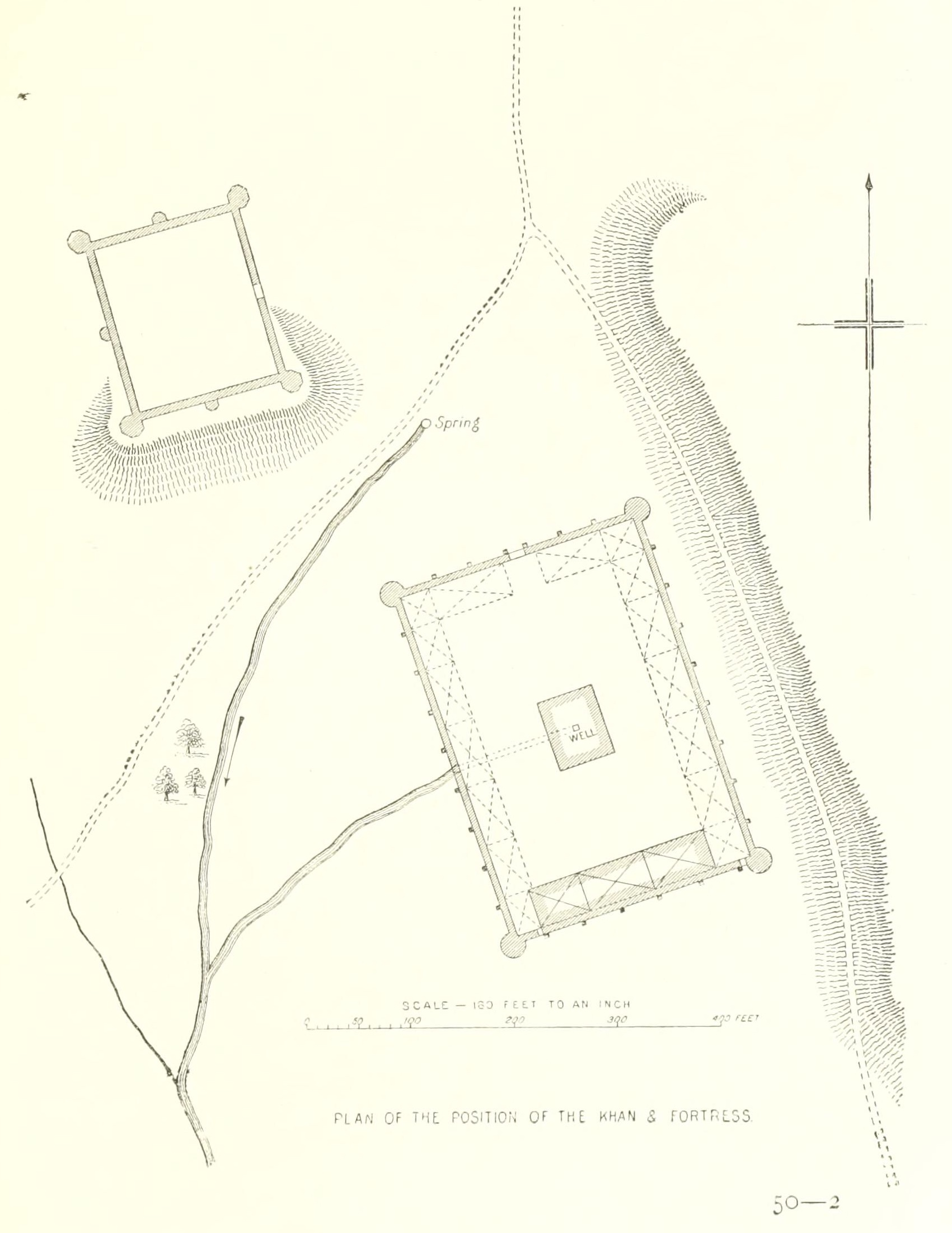
Khan el Tujjar from the 1871-77 PEF Survey of Palestine

In his Biblical Researches in Palestine, American scholar Edward Robinson described his visit in 1838, a day after the weekly Monday fair which had "drawn away from their home a large portion of the people of Nazareth". As Buckingham, he describes two large buildings, one a Khan, and one building looking more like a castle.

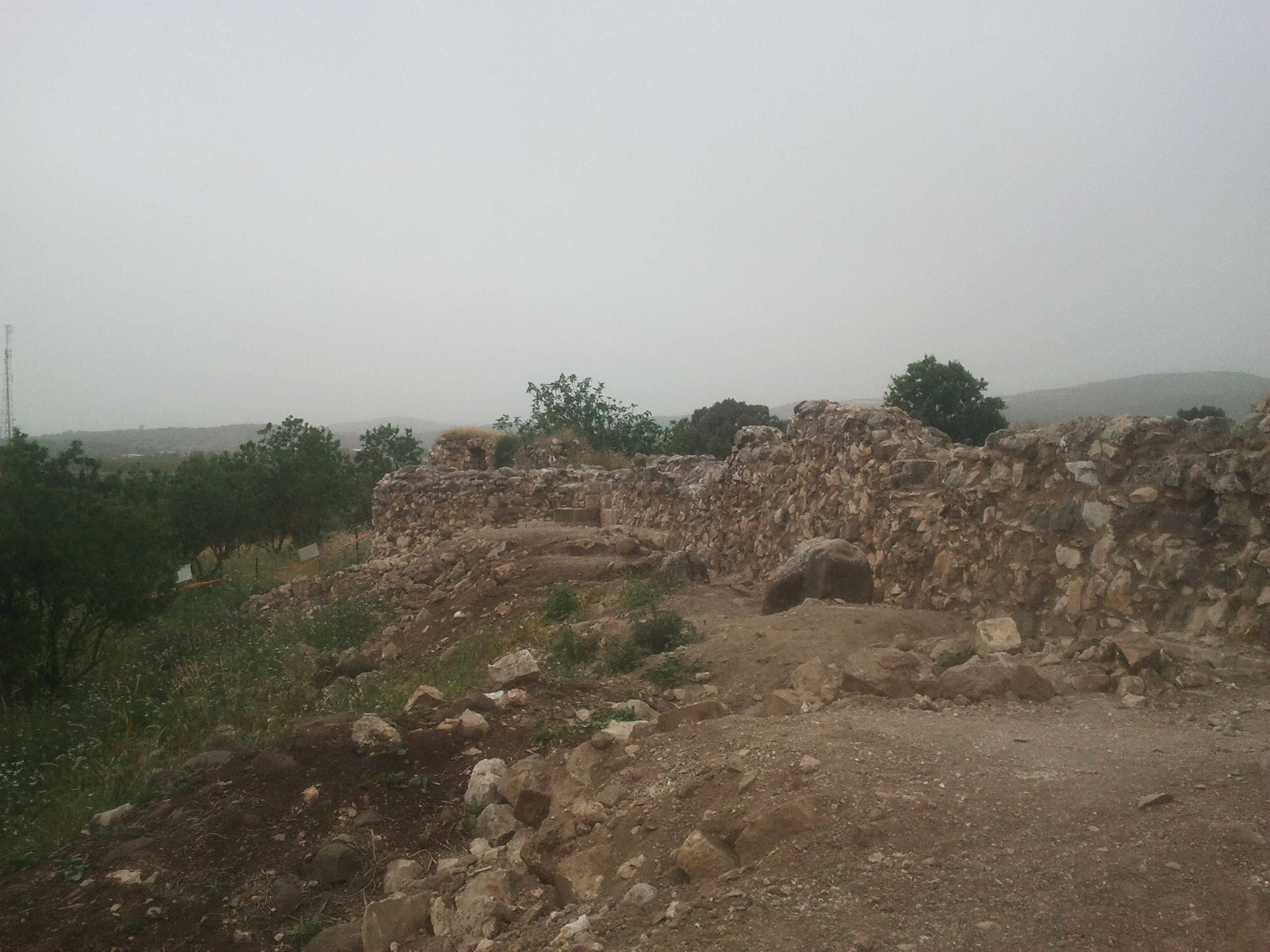
Remains of the Khan, in 2014

In the mid-1850s, W. M. Thomson made a lively description of a market day there:

On Monday of each week a great fair is held at the khans, when, for a few hours, the scene is very lively and picturesque. These gatherings afford an excellent opportunity to observe Syrian manners, customs, and costumes, and to become acquainted with the character and quality of Syrian productions. Thousands of people assemble from all parts of the country, either to sell, trade or purchase. Cotton is brought in bales from Nablus; barley, and wheat, and sesamum, and Indian corn from Huleh, the Hauran, and Esdraelon. From Gilead and Bashan, and the surrounding districts, come horses and donkeys, cattle and flocks, with cheese, leben, semen, honey and similar articles. Then there are miscellaneous matters, such as chicken and eggs, figs, raisins, apples, melons, grapes and all sorts of fruits and vegetables in season. The pedlars open their packages of tempting fabrics, the jeweller is there with his trinkets; the tailor with his ready-made garments; the shoemaker with his stock, from rough, hairy sandals to yellow and red Morocco boots; the farrier is there with his tools, nails, and flat iron shoes, and drives a prosperous business for a few hours; and so does the saddler, with his coarse sacks and gaily-trimmed cloths. And thus it is with all the arts and occupations known to this people.... But long before sunset not a soul of this busy throng remains on the spot. All return home, or to take refuge in some neighbouring village.

In 1875 Victor Guérin visited, and described and measured the two buildings. In 1881, when the PEF Survey of Palestine described it, Khan al-Tujjar was no longer a working caravanserai, but a market was held there each Thursday. They also noted that there was a well with a perennial supply by the Khan.

== See also ==
- Khan al-Tujjar (Nablus)

== Bibliography ==
- Buckingham, J.S. (1821). Travels in Palestine Through the Countries of Bashan and Gilead, East of the River Jordan, Including a Visit to the Cities of Geraza and Gamala in the Decapolis. London: Longman. Cited in Petersen, 2001, p. 200.
- Conder, C.R.; Kitchener, H.H. (1881). The Survey of Western Palestine: Memoirs of the Topography, Orography, Hydrography, and Archaeology. Vol. 1. London: Committee of the Palestine Exploration Fund.
- Egmont, van [in German]; Heyman, John (1759). Travels through part of Europe, Asia Minor, the islands of the archipelago, Syria, Palestine, Egypt, Mount Sinai, &c. giving a particular account of the most remarkable places. Vol. 2. London: L. Davis and C. Reymers.
- Guérin, V. (1880). Description Géographique Historique et Archéologique de la Palestine (in French). Vol. 3: Galilee, pt. 1. Paris: L'Imprimerie Nationale.
- Karmon, Y. (1960). "An Analysis of Jacotin's Map of Palestine" (PDF). Israel Exploration Journal. 10 (3, 4): 155–173, 244–253. Archived from the original (PDF) on 2019-12-22.
- Mariti, G. (1792). Travels Through Cyprus, Syria, and Palestine; with a General History of the Levant. Vol. 1. Dublin: P. Byrne.
- Palmer, E.H. (1881). The Survey of Western Palestine: Arabic and English Name Lists Collected During the Survey by Lieutenants Conder and Kitchener, R. E. Transliterated and Explained by E.H. Palmer. Committee of the Palestine Exploration Fund.
- Petersen, Andrew (2001). A Gazetteer of Buildings in Muslim Palestine (British Academy Monographs in Archaeology). Vol. 1. Oxford University Press. ISBN 978-0-19-727011-0. Archived from the original on 2021-05-28. (pp. 197 –200)
- Robinson, E.; Smith, E. (1841). Biblical Researches in Palestine, Mount Sinai and Arabia Petraea: A Journal of Travels in the year 1838. Vol. 3. Boston: Crocker & Brewster. Cited in Petersen, 2001, p 200.
- Schölch, A. (1993). Palestine in Transformation, 1856-1882: Studies in Social, Economic, and Political Development (PDF). Institute for Palestine Studies. ISBN 0-88728-234-2.
- Sharon, M. (1999). Corpus Inscriptionum Arabicarum Palaestinae. Vol. 2, B–C. BRILL. ISBN 90-04-11083-6.
- Stephan, Stephan H. (1937). "Evliya Tshelebi's Travels in Palestine, IV". The Quarterly of the Department of Antiquities in Palestine. 6: 84–97.
- Thomson, W.M. (1859). The Land and the Book: Or, Biblical Illustrations Drawn from the Manners and Customs, the Scenes and Scenery, of the Holy Land. Vol. 2 (1 ed.). New York: Harper & brothers.
