= Beit Keshet =

Beit Keshet: בֵּית קֶשֶׁת (Hebrew)
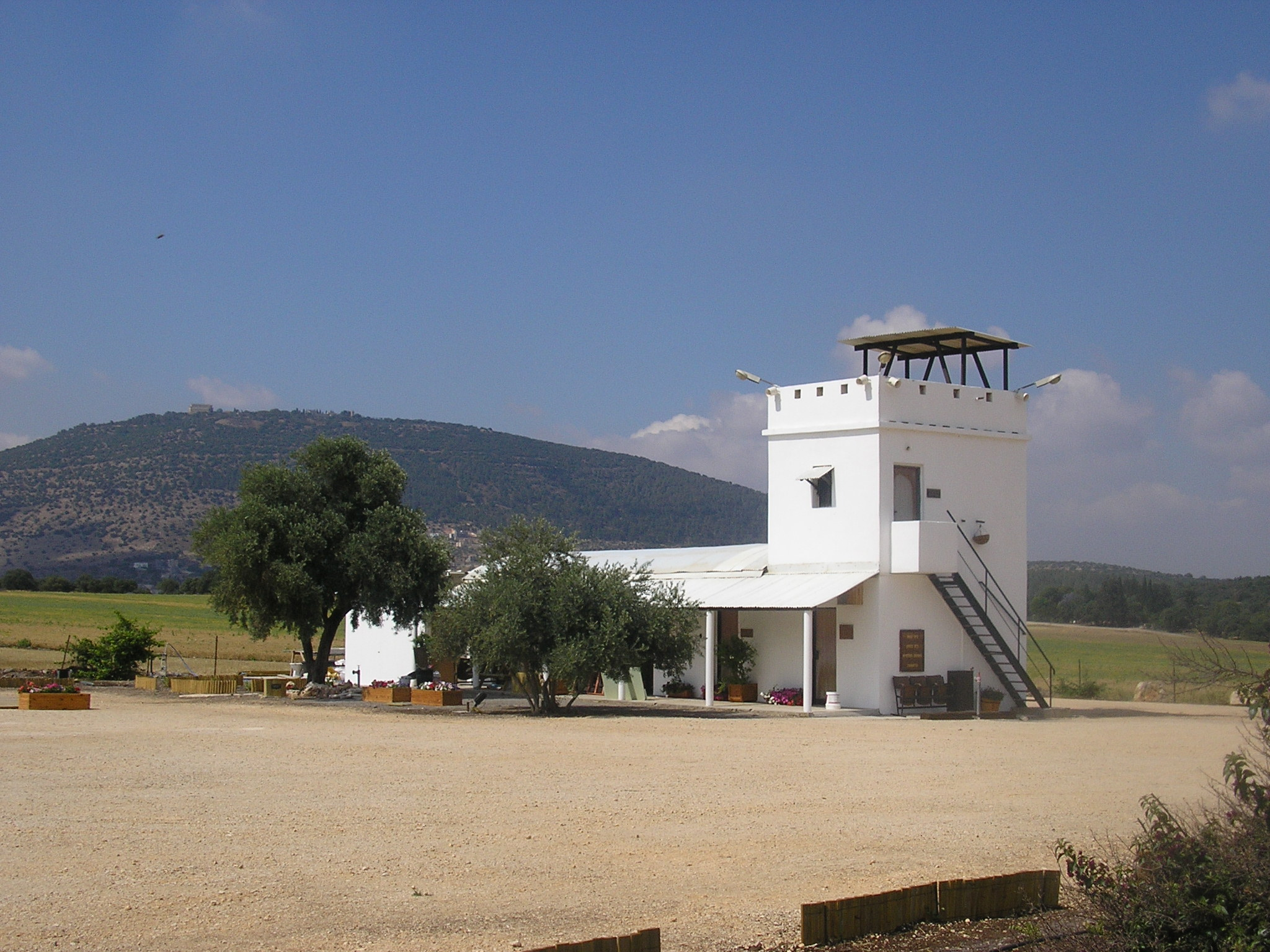
- Palmach museum, Beit Keshet
- Etymology: House of the Bow
- Location within Northeast Israel Location within Israel
- Coordinates: 32°43′6″N 35°23′40″E
- Country: Israel
- District: Northern
- Subdistrict: Kinneret
- Council: Lower Galilee
- Affiliation: Kibbutz Movement
- Founded: 1944
- Founder: HaNoar HaOved graduates
- Population (2024): 720

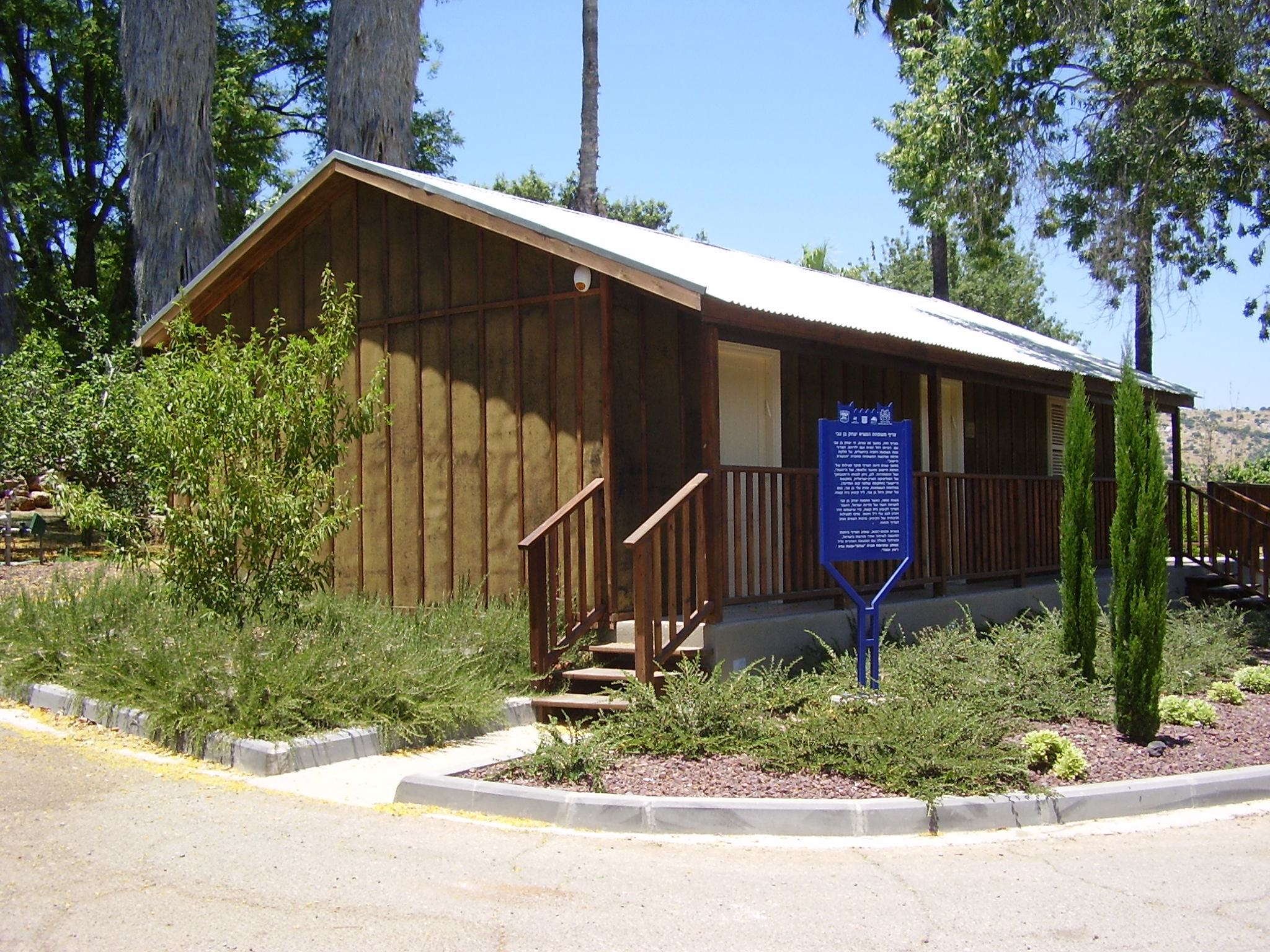
Wooden hut of former Israeli President Yitzhak Ben-Zvi in Beit Keshet

Beit Keshet (Hebrew: בֵּית קֶשֶׁת, lit. House of the Bow) is a kibbutz in northern Israel. Located to the east of Nazareth, it falls under the jurisdiction of Lower Galilee Regional Council. As of 2024 its population was 720. It is located immediately opposite the Al-Tujjar Caravansarai.

== Etymology ==
The name Beit Keshet ("House of the Bow") is derived from 2 Samuel 1:18 in the Bible: "...teach the children of Judah the use of the bow," which is also a symbol for defending Israel.

== History ==
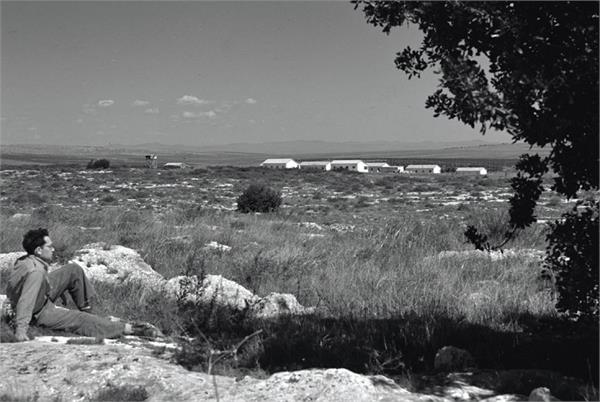
Beit Keshet 1940

Beit Keshet was established in 1944 by HaNoar HaOved youth, who were trained at the Kfar Tavor agricultural school. During the founding of the kibbutz, a group of immigrants who were a part of the Youth movement HaMahanot HaOlim and graduates of the Kadoorie Agricultural High School joined the kibbutz. According to the Jewish National Fund, more than half of the original group had served with the Jewish forces during the Second World War.

By 1947, Beit Keshet had a population of over 100. During the 1948 Arab–Israeli war, Lebanese and Syrian troops attempted to capture Beit Keshet and nearby Sejera in fighting which the Jewish National Fund refers to as "fierce."

On 16 March 1948, seven members of the kibbutz were killed during the battle of Beit Keshet. Among them was Eli, the son of Rachel Yanait and Yitzhak Ben-Zvi, the future second president of Israel. The story of the founding of the kibbutz and the battle is depicted in the theatre play An Israeli Love Story by Pnina Gary and in the 2017 film of the same name.

== See also ==
- List of forests in Israel
