= Marina Razbezhkina =

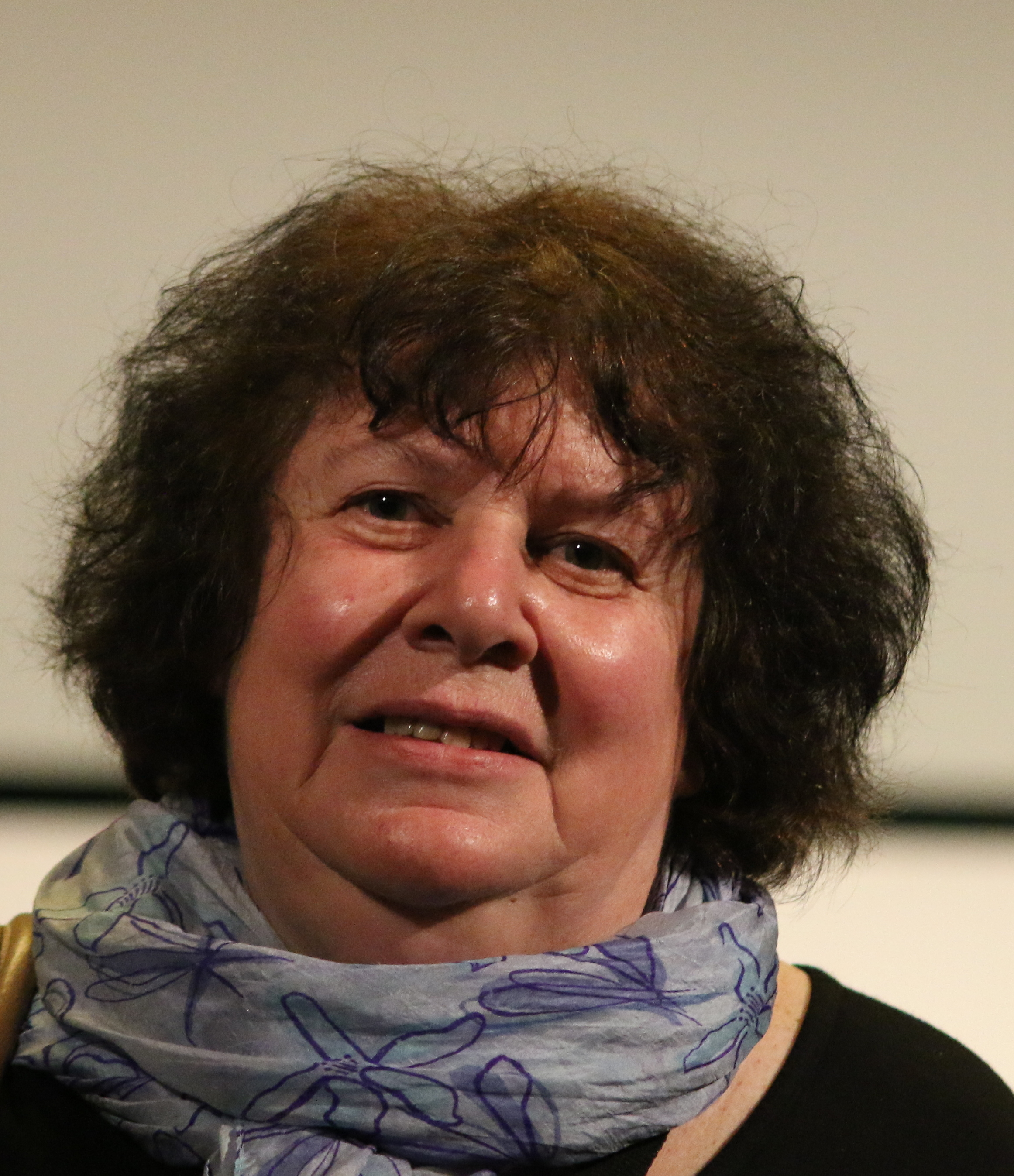
- Marina Razbezhkina in 2015.
- Born: 17 July 1948 (age 78); Kazan, USSR
- Citizenship: Russia
- Education: Kazan State University
- Occupations: Documentary filmmaker, producer, writer

Marina Razbezhkina (Russian: Марина Разбежкина) is a Russian screenwriter, producer, director and documentary filmmaker. Working on such films asHarvest Time, The Hollow and Optical Axis she has multiple awards at international film festivals including the Chicago International Film Festival.

== Biography ==
Razbezhkina was born in 1948 in the city of Kazan, USSR. After graduating with a degree in Philology from Kazan State University in 1971 she entered the field of documentary filmmaking. Working as a screenwriter in Kazan, she later moved to Moscow where she directed her first film Harvest Time. Her debut film gained critical acclaim, winning at the Taipei Film Festival in the category of International New Talent and at the Chicago International Film Festival for Best Feature Film.

In addition to her work in film Razbezhkina has lectured at Kazan University, Natalia Nesterova University and the Internews Film and Television School on the film industry. In 2008, Razbezhkina acted as a judge at the Kinotavr Film Festival and a year later she founded the Marina Razbezhkina School of Documentary Films and Theatre and became its principal.

== Filmography ==
=== As director ===
Year	Film	Ref.
2004	Harvest Time	
2006	Holidays	
2007	The Hollow	
2013	Optical Axis	
