= Elsewhere, Perhaps =

1966 novel by Amos Oz

- First edition (Hebrew)
- Author: Amos Oz
- Original title: מקום אחר
- Translator: Nicholas de Lange
- Language: Hebrew
- Publisher: Sifriat Po'alim
- Publication date: 1966
- Publication place: Israel
- English publication date: 1973
- ISBN: 0-15-183746-5
- Followed by: My Michael

Elsewhere, Perhaps (Hebrew: מקום אחר Makom Acher) is the debut novel of Israeli author Amos Oz and was published in 1966. It is his first attempt portraying life on a Kibbutz, a recurrent theme in his later works.

The story is set in the fictional kibbutz of Metzudat Ram, where the original pioneers have lost the idealism of their younger years. Their attachment to collectivism has become more of a habit than deeply felt belief. Their lives have become more bourgeois and the kibbutz has become characterised by monotony and gossip. The novel was translated into English in 1973 and was also published in the United States, United Kingdom, France, Sweden, Finland, Germany, Spain and Argentina. It was later adapted into a successful stage play at Cameri Theater in 1982.

Fifteen years later, A Perfect Peace (1982) was published, and is considered a sister novel of Elsewhere, Perhaps.

== Background ==
In a 1991 interview with The New York Times Magazine, Oz spoke about the novel, "I wanted to tell the story of an entire community from the point of view of a Greek chorus. The 'we' of that novel is the voice of the crowd."

== Plot ==
Set in Metzudat Ram, a fictional kibbutz on the northern border with Syria, bourgeois ideals, monotony and gossip have taken root among the residents. A major talking point is the adultery among the Harish and Berger families. Reuven Harish, a schoolteacher embarks on an affair with Bronka, wife of Ezra Berger, a truck-driver. Meanwhile, Ezra is having an affair with Reuven's teenage daughter, Noga."

== Reception ==
The novel was praised in a 1973 review by Christopher Lehmann-Haupt, writing in The New York Times: "It adds up to a charmingly unpious tapestry of Israeli life. And it is with intricate needlework that Mr. Oz weaves out of this human comedy an ironically serious statement on the symbolic birth of the new Israeli- in this case the illegitimate offspring of the sexual scandal."

In 1974, the novel was praised by Alan H. Friedman in The New York Times: "Rich and thickly textured, Oz's first novel, "Elsewhere, Perhaps," creates before the mind's eye an entire kibbutz society in considerable depth."

David Stern of Commentary magazine recognised the talents of Oz but published a negative review, concluding: "The novel fails precisely where the imagination might have offered insight into the nexus of Zion and Diaspora."

== Stage adaptation ==
In the 1980s, Pnina Gary and Hanan Snir staged a successful stage adaptation of the novel at Cameri Theatre in Tel Aviv.
