= My Michael =

1968 novel by Amos Oz

- First edition (Hebrew)
- Author: Amos Oz
- Original title: מיכאל שלי
- Translator: Nicholas de Lange
- Language: Hebrew
- Publisher: Am Oved
- Publication date: 1968
- Publication place: Israel
- English publication date: 1972

My Michael (Hebrew: מיכאל שלי Mikha'el sheli) is a 1968 novel by the Israeli author Amos Oz. The story, told in first-person by a dissatisfied wife, describes her deteriorating marriage to a geology student and her escape into a private fantasy world of violent heroics and sexual encounters. Set in Jerusalem of the 1950s, the novel uses the physical and political landscape of the city as a metaphor for the protagonist's inner struggle. The novel garnered much controversy upon its publication in Israel, and was also the best-selling novel in Israel in the 1968–1969 season. The novel was translated into English in 1972 and has since been translated into more than 30 languages. It was adapted into a Hebrew-language film in 1976.

== Plot ==
Hannah Greenbaum, a first-year literature student, meets Michael Gonen, a doctoral student in geology, by chance in her Hebrew University building. They date briefly and then marry, though their backgrounds and personalities could not be more dissimilar. They rent a small apartment in the Mekor Barukh neighborhood populated by religious Jews unlike themselves. Michael's aunts and other elderly acquaintances pop in and out of their lives, but Hannah is largely on her own as Michael pursues his degree.

While Michael runs his life in a calm, methodical, unemotional manner, Hannah feels increasingly hemmed in by sameness and routine. She begins to escape into private fantasies – some featuring the heroes of her favorite childhood books, like Jules Verne's Michael Strogoff and Captain Nemo – and others based on her own dreams of being an exciting Sephardi woman named Yvonne Azulai, of being raped by strangers, of being a cold princess who commands others to go into battle for her. Two recurrent figures in her fantasies are Arab twin boys with whom she used to play as a child.

Michael finally realizes how deeply she has sunken when she has a nervous breakdown one winter day before he is called up to serve in the 1956 Sinai campaign, and orders her to stay in bed until the doctor comes. But he cannot satisfy Hannah's unfulfilled sexual needs and her daydreams and nightmares continue, forcing her downward into a vortex of lust and fantasy. Hannah also finds it difficult to love their child, Yair, who is as pragmatic and non-relationship-oriented as his father. When Hannah finally conceives another child, Michael is no longer hers, having been seduced by an old college friend who constantly asks him to help her write her papers. The novel ends with Hannah still married, but for all intents and purposes estranged from Michael.

== Themes ==
The relationship between Arabs and Jews in Jerusalem and Israel lends an undercurrent of fear and mistrust to the story. While the Arab-Israeli political situation is not discussed overtly, the setting of the novel in the early 1950s indicates that Israel had recently fought for its existence against armies from Egypt, Syria, Transjordan, Lebanon, and Iraq during the 1948 Arab–Israeli War, and the country continued to be targeted by "small-scale Palestinian infiltrations – supported by the Arab states – into Israeli territory" between 1949 and 1956. Wells and Loy write: "The novel uses 1950s Jerusalem as a metaphor for Israel itself, portraying the community as it then was – a mostly besieged enclave in an ever-threatening wilderness".

Ehud Ben-Ezer explains that post-independence, Israeli fiction like My Michael portrayed Arabs as an existential threat. The Arab twins who metamorphose in Hannah's imagination from childhood playmates into deadly terrorists are not the cause for her suffering, he explains, but a metaphor for it. Amos Elon also notes this undercurrent of Arab-Jewish tension. Jerusalem in the 1950s, when the story takes place, was a city partitioned into Jewish and Arab sectors by the 1949 Armistice border. Beneath the monotony of Hannah's life lies the insecurity of living in "a city divided, its 'Europeanized' Israeli sector surrounded on three sides by an ever-present menace, the deadly hostile Arab natives". Elon adds that Oz finished writing the novel in May 1967, a few weeks before the outbreak of the Six-Day War which resulted in the Israeli annexation of Arab East Jerusalem. Elon observes that the reunification of Jerusalem did nothing to unify its Arab and Jewish citizenry, saying: "an invisible line continues to divide the two sectors, and will likely do so for a long time to come".

The 1956 Sinai campaign also figures in the plot, with Michael being called up for duty and Hannah remaining alone with their child on the home front. Israeli literary critic Gershon Shaked has noted that Hannah's nervous breakdown, coming just as Israel is preparing for war, "corresponds to the [factual] Sinai Campaign, which was perceived as discharging tensions that had built up from years of living on the edge".

Oz further employs the architectural landscape of Jerusalem – its stone houses, iron railings, narrow alleys, and hidden courtyards – to elicit feelings of hopelessness and "cutting people off from one another".

Duality also appears throughout the novel. Dana Amir points to the characters of the Arab twins, the contrasting characters of the two Michaels – "Michael Gonen, the grey, reserved, submissive, dry-witted man contrasts with Michael Strogoff, the invincible hero of the inner world whose eyes are filled with blue metal" – and the contrasting character of Hannah herself – a "quiet, introverted student" as compared to "her dream-double: a princess who holds the strangers that humiliate her tight in her sadomasochistic grip". Doubleness extends to setting and dialogue, with clear divisions drawn between Hannah's inner and outer worlds.

== Development ==
My Michael was Amos Oz's second novel. When Oz, a member of Kibbutz Hulda, first began writing stories, he received permission from the kibbutz administration to spend one day a week writing and the other days teaching or working in the fields. But Oz said he worked on this novel every night as well. While his wife and daughters slept in their one-and-a-half-room apartment, he sat in the lavatory with the book on his knees, writing and smoking until the wee hours. After My Michael was published, Oz gave the royalties to the kibbutz, and successfully petitioned the kibbutz administration to allow him two days a week for writing.

Critics have noted that Hannah, the narrator of the novel, reflects "all the intelligence, romanticism, and melancholy" of Oz's own mother, who committed suicide when he was twelve years old. Oz rejected this comparison.

== Publishing history ==
My Michael was published in Hebrew in 1968 by Am Oved. It was the best-selling novel in Israel in the 1968–1969 season, with nearly 40,000 copies sold in its first 18 months. The novel was reissued by Keter Publishing House in 1990 and 2008, and by Keter/Yediot Aharonoth in 2010. The English edition, translated by Nicholas de Lange, would be the first of 16 of Oz's books translated into English by the British academic. The English edition was first published in 1972 by Chatto & Windus (London) and Alfred A. Knopf (New York).

My Michael has been translated into more than 30 languages. It is one of two Oz titles that have been translated into Arabic. Many of the book's international publishers printed a special twentieth-anniversary edition in 1988.

== Reception ==
The novel became one of the best-known works by Oz.

Following the publication of the translation in England and the United States in 1972, overseas reviews focused on the novel's "literary strengths, especially the rich detail and suggestive imagery by which it traces Hannah’s slow mental erosion". The Guardian, for example, complimented Oz's ability to overlay passages of "strident lyricism" with vivid "descriptions of mundane reality".

Many reviews note that the novel lacks a plot, being a straightforward account of courtship, marriage, pregnancy, birth, and daily life. But praise was given for the psychological character study of Hannah. Richard Locke of The New York Times describes My Michael as "an extremely self-conscious and serious psychological novel, slow, thoughtful, self-assured and highly sophisticated, full of the most skillful modulations of tone and texture". Locke favorably compares the novel's existentialist style to works by Ernest Hemingway, Cesare Pavese, Joan Didion, and Albert Camus's The Stranger and Sylvia Plath's The Bell Jar. Addressing the Arab-Israeli allusions in the book, especially the relationship between Hannah and the Arab twins, Locke surmises: "Amos Oz is suggesting that in her heart Israel is going mad dreaming of Arabs, while on the surface emotionally stunted 'new Israelis' are going about their nation's business cut off from self and history. It's hardly surprising that the book caused controversy and was a best seller in Israel".

Joshua Leifer praised Oz's skill in depicting the city of Jerusalem between the 1948 and 1956 wars, but called the characterization of Hannah "unconvincing", in line with what he calls Oz's tendency to portray women in his fiction as "promiscuous, selfish, and untrustworthy". The Cincinnati Enquirer concurred, calling the character of Hannah "not interesting, [but] merely tiresome. She is afflicted with terribly tame erotic fantasies, blatant childhood holdovers, and very trite philosophical reflections". However, this review praised Oz's writing skills for "making her a believable neurotic. … The end result is a very good writer in search of a better character".

Upon its publication, the novel generated much controversy for its allusions to Arab-Jewish relations. Critics described the novel as "politically dangerous and subversive".

The Boston Globe reported in 1995 that upon the novel's release in Arabic in Egypt in 1995, "nearly every critique has been negative" – but the book was also in its second printing. This was refuted by Haaretz in 2011: ""My Michael," translated in the 1990s, received favorable reviews in Egypt."

Elon observed that the novel challenges the Zionist ideal of "a new, achievement-oriented society", conveying instead "a bleak, depressive pessimism" in its portrait of modern Israeli life. Eric Silver of The Guardian agreed, saying that the novel "challenges the pioneering simplicities and immigrant aspirations (My son, Herr Doktor) that underpin Israeli society". The Chicago Tribune similarly noted the perceived abandonment of Zionist ideals, calling the "unsympathetic" portrait of Hannah "a caustic repudiation of the cherished conception of the young sabra as invariably vigorous, dedicated and brave". Hannah, was accused of being "anti-Zionist" and an "Arab-lover". The novel did receive praise for addressing "the deep but often unacknowledged psychological connections between Israeli Jews and their Arab neighbors". Oz himself said in an interview:

I think that the implications of the Israel-Arab conflict, indirect as they are, enraged some readers and at the same time legitimized certain attitudes which were around, but were not expressed before—anyway, not in literature.

== Accolades ==
In 1999, My Michael was named "one of the 100 great novels of the 20th century" by the Bertelsmann publishing house of Germany.

== Film adaptation ==
The novel was adapted by Israeli director-screenwriter Dan Wolman as the 1974 release Michael Sheli (released in the U.S. in 1976). The Hebrew-language film was submitted as the Israeli entry for Best Foreign Language Film for the 48th Academy Awards, but was ultimately not accepted as a nominee.

== Sources ==
- Amir, Dana (2015). On the Lyricism of the Mind: Psychoanalysis and literature. Routledge. ISBN 9781317553595.
- Elon, Amos (2019). The Israelis: Founders and Sons. Plunkett Lake Press.
- Magill, Frank Northen (1985). Magill's Survey of Cinema, Foreign Language Films. Vol. 5. Salem Press. ISBN 9780893562434.
- Tucker, Spencer C.; Roberts, Priscilla, eds. (2008). The Encyclopedia of the Arab-Israeli Conflict: A Political, Social, and Military History. ABC-CLIO. ISBN 9781851098422.
