= Touch the Water, Touch the Wind =

1973 novel by Amos Oz

- First edition (Hebrew)
- Author: Amos Oz
- Original title: לגעת במים לגעת ברוח
- Translator: Nicholas de Lange
- Language: Hebrew
- Publisher: Am Oved
- Publication date: 1973
- Publication place: Israel
- English publication date: 1974
- Pages: 192
- ISBN: 0-15-190873-7

Touch the Water, Touch the Wind (Hebrew: לגעת במים לגעת ברוח La-ga'at ba-mayim, la-ga'at ba-ruah) is the third novel of Israeli author Amos Oz and was published in 1973. Thematically it deals with the shadow cast by the Holocaust.

== Plot ==
Elisha, a provincial Jewish school principal flees the Nazis in Europe by self-levitating to Israel, the promised land. Once on land, he makes a living by repairing watches and herding sheep. He has endless thoughts about infinity. Meanwhile, his wife, Stefa has also escaped Europe, to Moscow, aided by the Devil. There, she becomes acquainted with Stalin and becomes a senior figure in an international revolutionary wing of the Soviet Union. Elisha and Stefa are reunited in Israel when the latter gives up her burgeoning political career for her marriage. Once reunited, they descend into the core of the earth.

== Reception ==
Alan H. Friedman reviewed the novel for The New York Times: "This is the third novel by the lavishly gifted Israeli writer Amos Oz, and it offers a profusion of delightful passages couched in unfailingly lovely language." Friedman continued: "But scenes are treated with high-handed brevity, tangled relationships are snipped and summarized, interesting minor characters are inflated like balloons till they become pointlessly major, major figures are delineated like cartoons till they become interesting abstractions, flavorful thickenings in the plot are at once diluted, and the result, though beguiling is an exquisite sketch for a grand novel."
