= Amnon (given name) =

In the Bible, Amnon is the eldest son of King David.

Amnon is also the given name of:

- Amnon of Mainz, a medieval German rabbi and the subject of a popular legend
- Amnon David Ar (born 1973), Israeli painter
- Amnon Barzel (1935–2025), Israeli art curator and author
- Amnon Cohen (born 1960), Israeli politician
- Amnon Dankner (1946–2013), Israeli newspaper editor and author
- Amnon Filippi (born 1969), American professional poker player
- Amnon Jackont (born 1948), Israeli author of thrillers, historian and literary editor
- Amnon Kapeliouk (1930–2009), Israeli journalist and author
- Amnon Krauz (born 1952), Israeli Olympic swimmer
- Amnon Linn (1924–2016), Israeli retired politician
- Amnon Lipkin-Shahak (1944–2012), Israeli military officer and Chief of Staff and politician
- Amnon Lord (born 1952), Israeli journalist
- Amnon Netzer (1934–2008), Iranian-Jewish historian, researcher, professor and journalist
- Amnon Niv (1930–2011), Israeli architect and urban designer
- Amnon Pazy (1936–2006), Israeli mathematician; President of the Hebrew University of Jerusalem
- Amnon Rubinstein (1931–2024), Israeli law scholar, politician, and columnist
- Amnon Salomon (1940–2011), Israeli film cinematographer
- Amnon Sella (born 1934), academic and author
- Amnon Straschnov (born 1947), Israeli former judge
- Amnon Weiss, Israeli businessman and former Paralympic champion
- Amnon Wolman (born 1955), music composer
- Amnon Yariv (born 1930), Israeli-American professor of applied physics and electrical engineering at Caltech
- Amnon Yitzhak (born 1953), Haredi Israeli rabbi

== See also ==
- Arnnon Geshuri, American businessman
