= Panther in the Basement =

1995 novel by Amos Oz

- First edition (Hebrew)
- Author: Amos Oz
- Original title: פנתר במרתף
- Translator: Nicholas de Lange
- Language: Modern Hebrew
- Genre: Novel
- Publisher: Keter Publishing House; Vintage Books
- Publication date: 1995
- Publication place: Israel
- English publication date: October 1997
- Media type: Print Hardback and Paperback
- Pages: 160
- ISBN: 978-0-15-600630-9
- OCLC: 41331015

Panther in the Basement (Hebrew: פנתר במרתף (Panter Ba-Martef)) is a 1995 novel by Israeli author Amos Oz, published in English translation in 1998. The first chapter was published by The New York Times in 1997.

== Plot ==
Oz's reminiscent novel describes the doings of a twelve-year-old boy in 1947, the last year of the British Mandate of Palestine, during the British–Zionist conflict. Young Proffy has organized a pro-Israel underground cell that proposes to blow up Buckingham Palace or perhaps 10 Downing Street. These heroic dreams are no danger to anybody, but Proffy's friendship with a kindly British soldier causes his two fellow panthers to accuse him of treason.

== Film ==
The film The Little Traitor (2007), starring Alfred Molina, is based on the book.

== Reception ==
Lee Siegel reviewed the novel for The New York Times. Siegel concluded: "But underneath its rather transparent purposes, Panther in the Basement is an insightful, inventive and lyrical expression of this writer's forbearing vision of life under the aspect of mortality. Its effect is not that of a powerful, steady torrent, as in some of Oz's other novels, but that of an intermittently fine, stinging rain. As you come to the book's end, you think of all that has happened between Israel and the Arabs since the Oslo accords -- and you recall that Jeremiah was the most heartbroken of all the prophets."
