= Unto Death =

1966 novel by Amos Oz

- First edition (Hebrew)
- Author: Amos Oz
- Translator: Nicholas de Lange
- Language: Hebrew
- Publisher: Sifriat Po'alim
- Publication date: 1971
- Publication place: Israel
- English publication date: 1975
- ISBN: 0-15-193095-3

Unto Death (Hebrew: עד מוות Ad Mavet) is a volume of two novellas by Israeli author Amos Oz and was published in 1971.

The novella, Unto Death was previously published in the United States in Commentary in 1970.

== Background ==
In 2018, Oz told The Forward that the novellas have “a certain perspective on fanaticism, anti-Semitism, Jew-hatred, prejudice, which I wouldn’t have ever reached were it not for the Holocaust in the background.”

== Plot ==
=== Late Love ===
The first novella is narrated in the first person by its protagonist, an elderly and childless wandering lecturer named Shraga Unger. His university bosses want to make him take early retirement, due to his outdated style and his fixation on the subject of Russian Jews. Shraga looks sadly at his life and his poor relations with those around him, describes his daily routine at home and his visits to kibbutzim throughout the country, and wonders about the significance of his existence – and his imminent extinction. Shraga's words paint a picture of a tired, defeated man, anxious about Bolshevik subversion and the threat of extermination, and yet his soul is eager and thirsty for human contact, and more than that, for a sign of a sublime being that may give meaning to his existence.

=== Unto Death (AKA Crusade) ===
The second novella tells the story of a Crusader caravan making its way from France to Jerusalem in the spring of 1096. The journey is led by the noble Guillaume de Toron, but as it converges on its own, the dubious influence of his relative, the crooked Claude, a kind of sinful saint, oscillates between asceticism and religious fanaticism to binge devotion to his passions. The caravan moves slowly through villages and forests, at the turn of the seasons from autumn to winter. The pilgrims' contact with the woodpeckers on their way is difficult and violent, and extreme cruelty is reserved for Jews. The local residents are bathed in primordial hatred for the Jew, as a person and as an abstract essence, and it is clear that they attribute to him forces that threaten them. When the nobleman de Toron sinks into the twilight of what appears to be a religious-mystical trance, the moral degeneration of the people worsens and the image of humanity becomes increasingly distant from them. The caravan does not get to the province of Hefze, and the few survivors are trapped in a crumbling fortress where they struggle with cold, hunger and madness. The nobleman de Toron dies in the castle and the journey comes to an end.

== Reception ==
The novellas were praised by novelist Joseph McElroy in a review for The New York Times. McElroy wrote that "the images by which the sane artist shows the sick, bloodshriveling disjunctions of obsession are clear, terse and magical." McElroy concluded about the volume: "Proverbial fantasy, abstract passion, life at the fingertips--this style, which made his novel "Touch the Water, Touch the Wind" so fresh, enables Amoz Oz in "Unto Death " to make an ancient subject seem original with him."

In 1974, Alan H. Friedman wrote in The New York Times: "More haunting than either of these, "Crusade," a scarifying novella set in the Dark Ages, tears the reader apart precisely because the author immerses his imagination in the details of darkness."
