= To Know a Woman =

1989 novel by Amos Oz

- First edition (Hebrew)
- Author: Amos Oz
- Original title: לדעת אישה
- Translator: Nicholas de Lange
- Language: Hebrew
- Publisher: Keter Publishing House
- Publication date: 1989
- Publication place: Israel
- English publication date: 1991
- Pages: 262
- ISBN: 0-7011-3572-7

To Know a Woman (Hebrew: לדעת אישה La-da'at ishah) is a 1989 novel by Israeli author Amos Oz, published by Keter Publishing House.

It tells the story of a Mossad Agent, who returns from a mission abroad upon the mysterious death of his wife. Now retired, but with his instincts intact, he sets out to "know" the women in his wife, namely his mother, daughter and mother-in-law.

== Plot ==
Mossad agent, Yoel Ravid, returns to his home country from a mission in Helsinki upon the sudden death of his wife, Ivria, in an unexplained accident. Following the tragedy, Ravid, 47, ends his career with the secret service. He settles down into domestic life in Tel Aviv, where he rents a house with his teenage daughter, Netta. He sets out to get to "know" the women in his life, including Netta, his mother, Lisa and his mother-in-law, Avigail.

Yoel reflects Ivria's mysterious death, as well as the trajectory of their relationship. They had once had a highly sexual relationship that was upended by Ivria's focus on her Masters thesis. Their growing distance led to marital discord and separate bedrooms. They were however, brought together again through their daughter's suspected epilepsy.

== Reception ==
The novel was praised in a 1991 review by William H. Pritchard, writing in The New York Times: "With his impressive new novel, "To Know a Woman," that [Israeli] scene is mercilessly domestic, and the human condition is observed -- kept watch over -- with scrupulous exactitude."

In a separate 1991 review published by The New York Times, Michiko Kakutani described the novel as "rich and affecting", adding that: "When it comes to a more straightforward delineation of his hero's domestic life, however, Mr. Oz demonstrates his usual fluency as a writer. His portraits of Yoel, his mother, his mother-in-law and his daughter are, at once, humorous, melancholy and touching, and his ability to infuse the stuff of everyday life with a subtle symbolism lends the book the powerful undertow of myth."
