= Stolero-Yachman-Chachkes affair =

Unsolved murders in Israel

The Stolero-Yachman-Chachkes affair (Hebrew: פרשת סטולרו-יכמן-צ'צ'קס, romanized: Parshat Stolero-Yachman-Chachkes) refers to a series of three unsolved murders that took place in Israel in the early 1960s. The murders, which were never solved, aroused a great deal of public interest, and due to similarities between them, they are widely speculated to have been the work of a serial killer or Soviet intelligence.

== The murders ==
Between November 1962 and July 1963, three murders took place in central Israel. The victims were not connected, but each case showed similar parallels. In each murder, the killer, who had no apparent motive, gunned down the victims with an Uzi submachine gun, then immediately fled the scene and was not caught.

=== Moshe Stolero ===
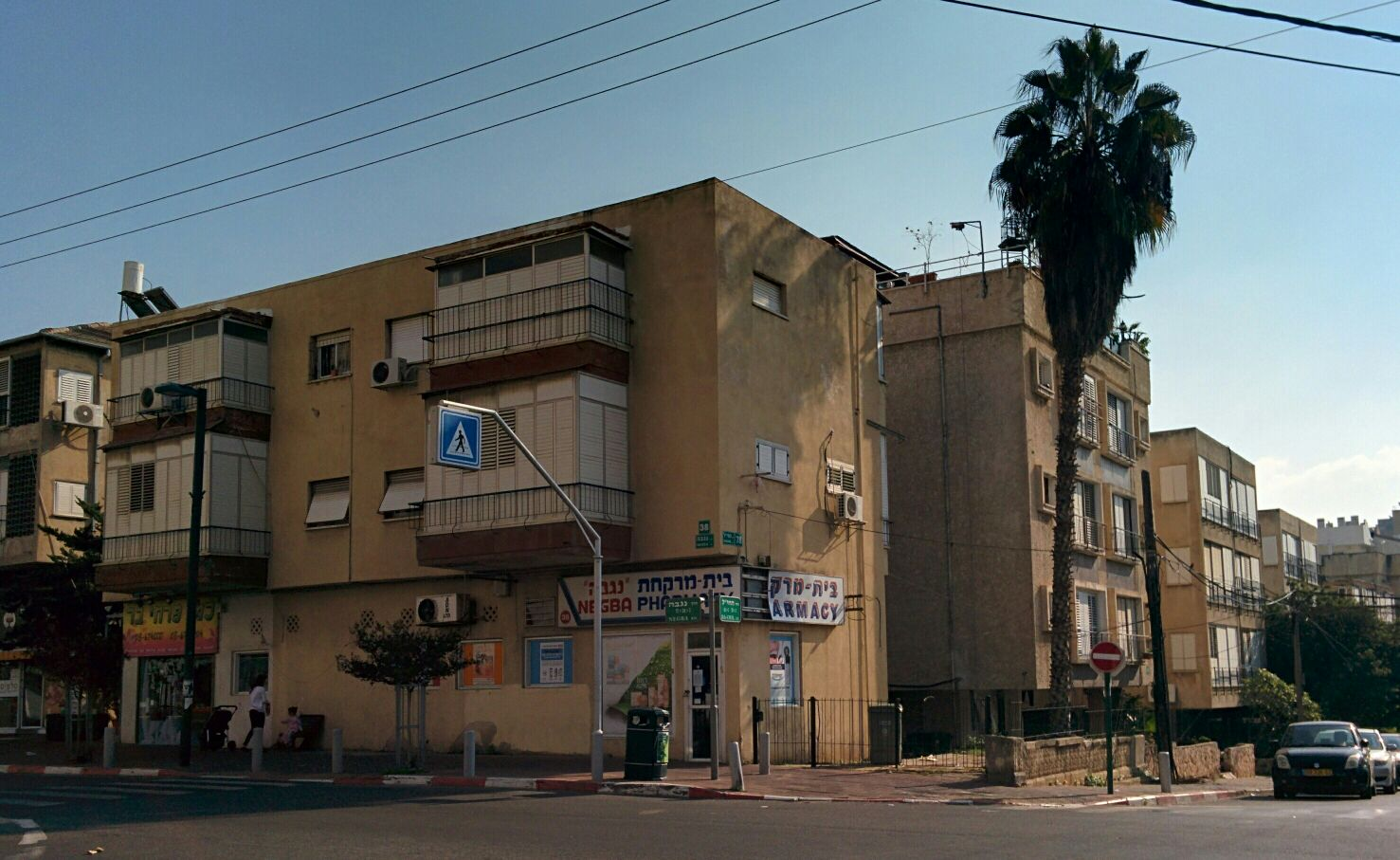
The murder scene of Moshe Stolero

The first victim was Moshe Stolero, a 32-year-old disabled man, who owned a household goods, book, and newspaper store in Ramat Gan, and lived with his parents in an apartment on Hachayal Street, in the same building where his store was located. On November 15, 1962, at around 7:00 PM, after Stolero had closed and locked up his shop and was returning home, a gunman fired at him with an Uzi as he was in the stairwell of the building. Stolero was hit three times and killed. The fact that the murder was not committed as part of a robbery attempt and nothing was stolen from his store led police to conclude that the murderer's sole intention was to kill Stolero.

=== Shmuel Yachman ===
The second victim was Dr. Shmuel Yachman, an internal physician in Tel Aviv who provided medical services to the US Embassy in Israel. Yachman, who was born in Germany as Siegfried Yachman, lived at 12 Mazeh Street. He was murdered on the night of April 2, 1963. Yachman and his wife Sarah were returning home from a concert, when at the entrance to their home, he was killed by a single shot to the neck from an Uzi. The killer immediately fled without leaving a trace.

=== Deborah Chachkes ===
The third victim was Deborah Chachkes, who lived with her family in a small house near an orchard on the outskirts of Kfar Saba. In the early morning hours of July 17, 1963, a man entered their home and fired several shots from an Uzi at Deborah and her husband Fishel as they slept. Deborah was killed and Fishel was seriously injured. The murderer again escaped.

== Public reaction ==
The fact that three mysterious murders had taken place within nine months, all without apparent motive, carried out with the same type of weapon, and in which the murderer managed to escape without leaving a trace, caused panic among the public as the media struggled to find an explanation. Due to the fact that Deborah Chechkes had visited the Soviet Union to see her sick mother two years before, and that Dr. Yachman provided services to the US Embassy, conspiracy theories about the involvement of Soviet intelligence were proposed.

=== Levy Neufeld affair ===
At around the same time, a 19-year-old medical student at the Hebrew University of Jerusalem named Levy Neufeld left his home and disappeared without a trace. Neufeld had survived the Holocaust as a toddler together with his brother Yehuda, and the two brothers had been adopted by a couple from Ramat Gan. Neufeld was an outstanding student, but as his final exams approached, he began to suffer from mental problems prior to his disappearance. After he had been gone for two weeks, his family reported him missing to police. Police then decided that there was a high probability that Neufeld committed the murders. A nationwide manhunt was launched in which over 1,000 police officers were involved. He was presented to the public as a dangerous person, and it was speculated that psychological damage brought on by the trauma of the Holocaust had driven him to kill. The press accused him of the murders, which led to the poet Zelda sending a letter of protest to Haaretz, accusing the press of baselessly accusing him without trial and comparing the media frenzy to a lynch mob.

On May 3, 1964, Neufeld was found dead by a group of youths in an abandoned building in the Ein Kerem neighborhood of Jerusalem. A suicide note and a bottle of poison were found next to his body. A pathological examination of his body found that the time of his death preceded two of the three murders.

== Allegations of Soviet involvement ==
It was speculated at the time that the murders may have been linked to Soviet involvement due to Chachkes' previous visit to the Soviet Union and Yachman's services to the US Embassy, although no explanation for why the Soviets would have wanted to kill Stolero was offered. In October 2012, Avraham Chachkes, the son of Deborah Chachkes, was interviewed by the Israeli newspaper Yediot Ahronoth, and claimed that his father Fishel had been active in organizing the escape of Soviet Jews who wanted to leave the country, and continued working for Israeli intelligence after his arrival in Israel. He speculated that his mother had been followed after her visit to the Soviet Union, and claimed that his father was the killer's actual target. Avraham claimed to have spoken with Israeli prime minister David Ben-Gurion himself over the matter, and said that Ben-Gurion had told him the killer was a Soviet agent who had since left the country. Isser Harel, the former director-general of the Mossad, denied the killer was a Soviet spy.

== See also ==
- List of fugitives from justice who disappeared
