= Fima =

Fima or FIMA may refer to:

- Fima (artist) (1914–2005), Israeli artist
- Fima (novel), a 1991 novel by Amos Oz
- Fellow of the Institute of Mathematics and its Applications

== See also ==
- FEMA (disambiguation)
