= Amos Oz: The Nature of Dreams =

- Directed by: Masha Zur Glozman; Yonathan Zur
- Produced by: Philippa Kowarsky
- Cinematography: Ron Bavarsky
- Music by: Avi Benjamin
- Production company: Yonthan & Masha Films
- Distributed by: Cinephil
- Release date: April 30, 2009 (Germany)
- Running time: 75 minutes
- Country: Israel
- Language: Hebrew

Amos Oz: The Nature of Dreams is an Israeli documentary film, written, directed and produced by Yonathan and Masha Zur (Yonathan & Masha Films). It is a portrait of Israeli author Amos Oz, author of the memoir A Tale of Love and Darkness, and his efforts toward peace in the Middle East.

The film, released in May 2009, is Yonathan and Masha Zur's second film (after Magia Russica, 2004). Amos Oz – The Nature of Dreams premiered at the Docaviv Documentary Film Festival in Tel Aviv. It was supported mainly by Arte ZDF and the Israeli Makor Film Fund, and also by YLE Finland and Radio Canada.

== Content summary ==
Amos Oz: The Nature of Dreams follows Oz through two years of his life as meets readers in Israel and all around the world and works to promote the two-state solution to the Israeli–Palestinian conflict. During the film, Oz meets fellow-writers, like Salman Rushdie, Paul Auster and Nadine Gordimer, offers advice to the Israeli president Shimon Peres, and conducts a long dialogue with Palestinian intellectual Sari Nusseibeh. It also follows his memoir A Tale of Love and Darkness, which brings his family's biography and his own stations in life, merged in the Jewish and Israeli collective history.

== Title ==
The original Hebrew title is עמוס עוז –ישר אל תוך השמש הקיצית (literally, Amos Oz – Straight into The Summer Sun), a reference to Oz's famous collection of essays Under this Blazing Light. The film's international title refers to a quote of Oz's that appears in the film, saying that the disappointment from Israel is not in the nature of Israel but in the nature of dreams.

== Production ==
The filming began in May 2007, when the Zurs began interviewing and filming Oz at meetings with audiences in Israel and then later on in Austria. In May 2008 the Israeli Makor Film Fund, Arte ZDF and other broadcasters joined the project. In autumn 2008 the production team joined Oz on his travels to New York City, where he gave a series of lectures at Columbia University, and to Germany, where he received the Heinrich Heine prize of the city of Düsseldorf. The film was completed in April 2009.

== Reception ==
The film was broadcast on Arte network in France and Germany, and on the 1st Israeli channel (Israel Broadcasting Authority). It was also bought by two Swiss broadcasters. In April 2010 it launched on cinema commercial screenings all over Australia. It was also screened in Film festivals around the world.
