= Mirjam Pressler =

German translator and children's writer

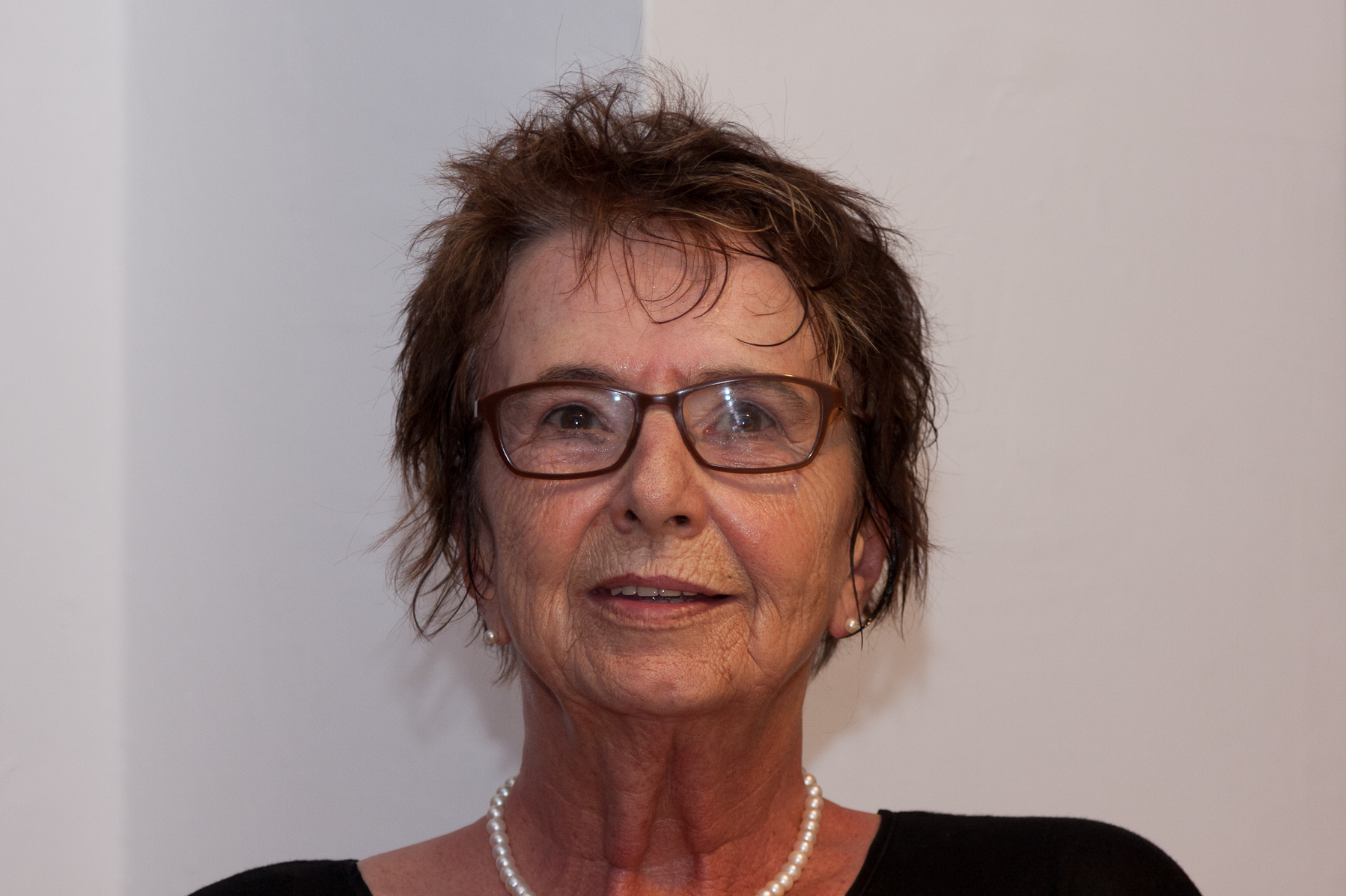
Pressler in 2012

Mirjam Pressler (18 June 1940 – 16 January 2019), born Mirjam Gunkel, was a German novelist and translator. Being the author of more than 30 children's and teenage books, she also translated into German more than 300 works by other writers from Hebrew, English, Dutch and Afrikaans. She is also known for translating a revision of Anne Frank's diary, The Diary of a Young Girl, in 1991, thus renewing its copyright.

Born to a Jewish mother, Pressler was raised in a foster home. She studied painting at Städelschule in Frankfurt as well as English and French literary studies at LMU Munich. Before becoming a writer, she was a jeans shop retailer for eight years, who, as a single mother, raised three daughters. Later, she became a member of the PEN Centre Germany.

== Bibliography ==
- Bitter Chocolate (1980), written by Mirjam Pressler, illustrated by Willi Glasauer, published by Beltz & Gelberg
- Scratches in the Paint (1981), written by Mirjam Pressler, illustrated by Willi Glasauer, published by Beltz & Gelberg
- Time on a Stick (1982), written by Mirjam Pressler, illustrated by Willi Glasauer, published by Beltz & Gelberg
- The Story of Anne Frank (1992), written by Mirjam Pressler, illustrated by Willi Glasauer, published by Beltz & Gelberg

== Awards ==
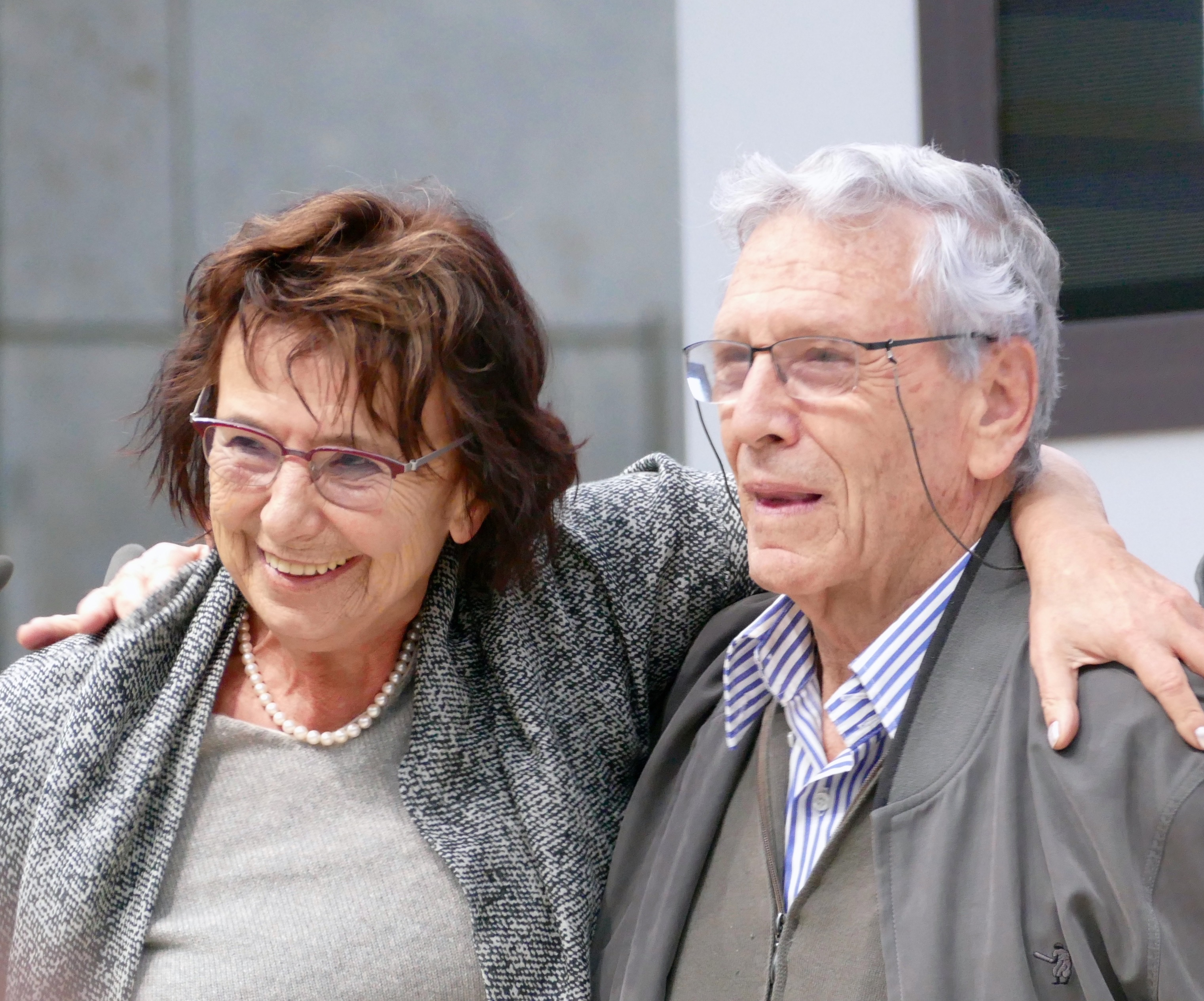
Pressler and Amos Oz in 2015. She won the Leipzig Book Fair Prize for her translation of his novel, Judas.

- Carl Zuckmayer Medal (2001)
- Corine Literature Prize (2009)
- Buber-Rosenzweig-Medal (2013)
- Leipzig Book Fair Prize (2015) for translation of Amos Oz's Judas
- Commanders Cross of the Order of Merit of the Federal Republic of Germany (2018)
