= My Michael (film) =

1976 Israeli film

- מיכאל שלי
- Directed by: Dan Wolman
- Written by: Dan Wolman; Amos Oz
- Starring: Oded Kotler
- Cinematography: Adam Greenberg
- Edited by: Ed Orshan
- Release date: 1974
- Running time: 95 minutes
- Country: Israel
- Language: Hebrew

My Michael (Hebrew: מיכאל שלי, translit. Michael Sheli) is a 1974 Israeli New Sensibility drama film directed by Dan Wolman, who co-wrote the screenplay. The film is based on the 1968 novel by Amos Oz, who is also the other co-writer for the screenplay. The film was released in the U.S. in 1976.

At the annual Kinor David awards ceremony, the film won in the categories of best director, best screenplay, best actor, and best actress. It was also selected as the Israeli entry for Best Foreign Language Film for the 48th Academy Awards, but was not accepted as a nominee.

== Plot ==
Jerusalem, 1950. The Terra Sancta building is home to the Hebrew University. Hana (Efrat Lavi) is a literature student. She stumbles on the stairs, and Michael Gonen (Oded Kotler), a geology student, helps her, marking the beginning of their friendship.

Hana is quiet and introverted, supporting herself by working as a kindergarten assistant. She nostalgically recalls the pre-war days when she played with twin Arab children from the Katamon neighborhood. Michael is a handsome and reserved man, deeply focused on his geology studies. Their relationship deepens, Hana becomes pregnant, and she agrees to Michael's request to marry him.

Michael's aunt, Genia, tries to dissuade Hana from marrying him but to no avail. The couple rents an apartment in a working-class neighborhood. Michael is absorbed in his research, while Hana grows bored and increasingly depressed. She observes the fits of madness experienced by her neighbor, Duba (Olga Shpendorff), and feels as though she herself is on the verge of losing her mind.

Their son, Yair, is born, but it does little to improve Hana’s mood. Her sexual relationship with Michael is unfulfilling, and she constantly fantasizes about intimacy with the twin Arab children she used to know. She is indifferent to Michael’s attraction to his student, Yardena (Irit Meiri).

Hana begins tutoring their neighbor’s son, Yoram (Moti Mizrachi-Arbel), in literature. Yoram is an adolescent, and there is an undercurrent of erotic tension between them, though nothing materializes. Eventually, Yoram and his family move away, and Hana watches him leave with a sense of longing.

Hana feels her life is monotonous, with every day blending into the next. She confronts Michael about her dissatisfaction, but he remains indifferent.

== Cast ==
- Oded Kotler as Michael Gonan
- Efrat Lavie as Hanna Gonen
- Ruth Farhi
- Moti Mizrahi
- Dina Roitkoff

== See also ==
- List of submissions to the 48th Academy Awards for Best Foreign Language Film
- List of Israeli submissions for the Academy Award for Best Foreign Language Film
