= The Little Traitor =

- Directed by: Lynn Roth
- Written by: Lynn Roth
- Based on: Panther in the Basement
- Produced by: Marilyn Hall
- Starring: Alfred Molina; Ido Port; Theodore Bikel; Rami Heuberger; Gilya Stern; Jake Barker
- Cinematography: Amnon Zalait
- Edited by: Michael Ruscio, Danny Shick
- Music by: Deborah Lurie
- Production companies: Evanstone Films and Panther Prods.
- Release date: 2007
- Running time: 89 minutes
- Countries: Israel; United States
- Languages: English; Hebrew
- Budget: $1,700,000 (estimated)

The Little Traitor is an independent family drama film written and directed by Lynn Roth. Based on the novel Panther in the Basement by author, Amos Oz, the movie takes place in British Mandatory Palestine in 1947, just a few months before Israel becomes a state.

Starring Alfred Molina and featuring Theodore Bikel, this is a coming of age tale of the unlikely bond between a kind British soldier and a spirited Jewish boy set against the backdrop of the birth of the State of Israel. It was filmed in 2007.

== Plot ==
The Little Traitor is set in 1947 Palestine, when the area still was ruled by the British, tells how 12-year-old Proffi (Ido Port) befriends the hated enemy, in the form of English Sgt. Dunlop (Alfred Molina), and sticks with him despite the suspicions of friends and family.

== Cast ==
- Alfred Molina as Sergeant Dunlop, a British Soldier
- Ido Port as Avi Leibowitz, nicknamed ‘Proffy’
- Rami Heuberger as Proffy's Father
- Gilya Stern as Miriam, Proffy's Mother
- Guy Krasner as Chita, Proffy's friend
- Yonatan Lahat as Ben Hur, Proffy's friend
- Boris Reinis as Chita's Father
- Lior Sasson as Mr. Hochberg
- Theodore Bikel as the Interrogator
- Anat Klausner as Yardena, Proffy's Babysitter
- Dafna Melzer as Rachel, Proffy's love interest

== Production ==
The Little Traitor was a co-production between Evanstone films (Israel) and Panther Productions (US). What appealed the most to writer/director Lynn Roth was sharing the story of a, “boy (who) finds himself caught between his hatred of "the British"—whom he dreams of destroying—and his growing affection for a member of the detested enemy.”

On the third day of production, while filming in Jerusalem, war broke out between Israel and Lebanon. Director Roth was afraid that after years of painstakingly putting together this film, it would all crumble in an afternoon, but the Israeli cast and crew insisted that the production go on. When Alfred Molina’s representatives were intent on getting him out of the country, Molina casually responded, "What are you talking about? The movie is still shooting, and besides, I just had the best pita and hummus I've ever eaten in my life."

== Release ==
The Little Traitor had a limited theatrical release and was distributed in the United States by Westchester Films. It also had a theatrical release in Canada, Israel, Mexico and Costa Rica. It was the longest running and highest-grossing film to date at the Movies of Delray theatre in Palm Beach County, Florida.

The movie was bought by Showtime for pay cable. Warner Brothers purchased the movie for Video on Demand.

== Awards & Festivals ==
- Miami International Film Festival
- Haifa International Film Festival
- Palm Beach International Film Festival – Audience Choice Award for Best Feature Film
- Palm Springs International Film Festival- Best of the Fest Award
- Humanitas Prize – Nomination for Best Feature Film Screenplay
- Armenian International Film Festival for Children & Youth – Best Feature
- Munich International Film Festival
- AFI Dallas International Film Festival
- Stockholm International Film Festival
- Los Angeles Jewish Film Festival – Best Narrative Award
- Atlanta Jewish Film Festival - Audience Award for Best Narrative Feature
- New York International Independent Film and Video Festival - Best Feature Award

== Soundtrack ==
The Little Traitor original motion picture soundtrack was composed by Deborah Lurie and released on CD and iTunes in 2011. Deborah Lurie is an American composer, producer and string arranger, well known for her musical work on Justin Bieber: Never Say Never, Dear John, 9, and the remake of Footloose. As a string arranger, she contributed to the film musicals, Fame and Dreamgirls.
