= Black Box (novel) =

1986 novel by Amos Oz

- First edition (Hebrew)
- Author: Amos Oz
- Original title: קופסה שחורה
- Translator: Nicholas de Lange
- Language: Hebrew
- Publisher: Keter Publishing House
- Publication date: 1986
- Publication place: Israel
- English publication date: 1988

Black Box (Hebrew: קופסה שחורה Kufsah Shehorah ) is a novel by Israeli writer Amos Oz, first published in 1986. The book is written in the form of letters, which the various characters write to each other. The correspondence ultimately proves a metaphor for the fractiousness and contention between Israeli Jews of different political and religious outlooks.

The book's plot deals with the tensions resulting from a destroyed marriage. The behavior of a wild and rebellious son, spiraling out of control, serve as an excuse for a rejected wife to write to her ex-husband and conjure up their past demons.

== Characters ==
- Ilana Brandstatter – the main character in the story, she marries Alex Gideon and eventually they divorce because Ilana is unfaithful. Ilana seeks a new life by marrying Michael Somo, but grows to despise him as well. She is the mother of Boaz Gideon.
- Alex (also Alec) Gideon – an Israeli war hero and scion of a now-elite early European immigrant family. He has turned dove and become an academic expert on religious fanaticism. He moves to the United States after his marriage with Ilana breaks up.
- Boaz Gideon – Ilana and Alex's son, he is violent and unruly.
- Michel Sommo – a Jewish immigrant from Algeria, hence, sephardic, whom Ilana marries in an attempt to rebuild her life. Michael is the fanatical type whom Alec studies.

The book begins with Alex in Chicago, Ilana, Michel-Henri Sommo, and their daughter Yifat in Jerusalem, and Boaz at his agricultural school somewhere to the north. Key places in the book include:

- Chicago – where Alex teaches as a professor specializing in political and religious fanaticism
- Zikhron Ya'akov – where Alex grew up, where his father, powerful, possibly corrupt early Zionist lived until he was sent to a sanatorium, and where Boaz moves towards the end of the book to fix it up.
- Kiryat Arba – a settlement near Hebron, where Boaz is sent by Michel to reform, highly religious.
- Kibbutz – an unspecified kibbutz from which Rachel (Ilana's sister) writes, where Ilana and Boaz lived right after the divorce.
- Algeria/France – where Michel was born and then later lived, respectively.
- Poland – where Ilana was born
- Russia – where Alex's father was born

== Reception ==
The novel was praised by Mark Charney in his 1988 review for The New York Times: "His voice is rich, passionate, committed, febrile, intellectual. In the epistolary novel Black Box, he extends his impressive range."

Separately, Walter Goodman also reviewed the novel for The New York Times: "...the letters hold our attention as the writers swing between selfishness and generosity, despair and dreams, near lunacy and a semblance of sanity, reaching out in their individual ways for peace and love. In their inconstancy and inconsistency, these people are thoroughly human. Happiness may be beyond them, but their story leaves us with the hope of reconciliation through a simple affection that is an antidote to fanaticism."

== Film adaptation ==
In 1993, a film adaptation of the novel was released. It was directed by Yeud Levanon and starred Bruria Albek, Ami Traub, Matti Seri and Amnon Meskin.

== Stage adaptation ==
In 2003, the novel was adapted for the stage by Hanan Snir as a production between Habima Theater and Beersheba Theater.
