= Fima (novel) =

1991 novel by Amos Oz

- Hebrew cover page
- Author: Amos Oz
- Original title: המצב השלישי
- Translator: Nicholas de Lange
- Language: Hebrew
- Publisher: Keter Publishing House
- Publication date: 1991
- Publication place: Israel
- English publication date: 1993
- Pages: 262
- ISBN: 0-15-189851-0

Fima (Hebrew: המצב השלישי (Ha-Matsav Ha-Shelishi) is a 1991 novel by Israeli author Amos Oz, published by Keter Publishing House.

== Plot ==
In 1989 in Jerusalem, we meet Efraim Nisan (Fima), a bachelor and medical receptionist, whose ambitions to become a historian and poet failed to materialise. He engages in political debates with strangers and rallies against his right-wing father. He longs to lead the country and solve long-standing issues for the nation through seemingly simple solutions.

He lives in disorder, failing to take care of his health and apartment. His personal life is complicated by his romantic involvement with three women, including a patient at the clinic where he works, the wife of a close friend and Yael, his ex-wife.

Fima confronts his mother's earlier death as well as the sorrow caused by an abortion he insisted that Yael have during their marriage.

== Reception ==
The novel was praised in a 1993 review by Francine Prose, writing in The New York Times:" "Fima" is one of those novels in which we begin to suspect that the protagonist is meant to be emblematic of a generation. Surely Fima isn't the only Israeli idealist of a certain age reduced by the current political climate to compulsive newspaper reading and arguing with the radio. But it's one of that smaller, more exclusive group of novels that manage something trickier: it succeeds in making us believe in the particular, individual life of this man of his generation, and sympathize with him." Prose praised Oz for being "faultlessly patient and tender with his characters." Her review concluded: "By the novel's end, we're no longer thinking of Kafka's "Metamorphosis" but of more hopeful, autumnal fictions, for example Chekhov's story "The Duel." We no longer feel we're observing a hero who should welcome any change at all -- even transformation into a giant insect -- but rather a man who has been transformed from his former self into something larger, and more fully human."
