= FEMA (disambiguation) =

FEMA is the abbreviation for the United States Federal Emergency Management Agency.

FEMA may also refer to:

- Federation of European Motorcyclists Associations, an association of groups and organisations representing motorcyclists throughout Europe
- Festival La Rochelle Cinéma, an annual international film festival held in La Rochelle, France
- Flavor and Extract Manufacturers Association, an organization that deals with flavors and extract processing in the United States
- Foreign Exchange Management Act, 1999, India
- Foreign Extraterritorial Measures Act of Canada that aims to counteract the American Helms-Burton Act
- Fundação Educacional do Município de Assis, the governing body of a university in Assis, Brazil
- N-acetylmuramoyl-L-alanyl-D-glutamyl-L-lysyl-(N6-glycyl)-D-alanyl-D-alanine-diphosphoundecaprenyl-N-acetylglucosamine:glycine glycyltransferase, an enzyme abbreviated FEMA

== See also ==
- Failure mode and effects analysis (FMEA)
- Femur
- Fima (disambiguation)
