= Where the Jackals Howl =

1965 book by Amos Oz

- First edition (Hebrew)
- Author: Amos Oz
- Original title: ארצות התן
- Translator: Nicholas de Lange
- Language: Hebrew
- Publisher: Masada
- Publication date: 1965
- Publication place: Israel
- English publication date: 1981
- Pages: 173
- ISBN: 0-15-196038-0

Where the Jackals Howl (Hebrew: ארצות התן Artzot HaTan) is the first book by Israeli author Amos Oz and was published in 1965. It consists of short stories, some of which had already been published in magazines. The stories revolve mostly around kibbutz members.

== Title ==
The title of the book is derived from the name of the first story in the collection: "The Jackal Lands", but this is not the only reason for the book's title. Jackals are present in almost every one of the stories, and their descriptions, behavior, and hair-raising howls that are heard well at night convey more strongly the dark passions and desires that man is imprisoned within. The narrator seems to point to the animal dimension in man, hidden within people, in whom the reader meets every day, without guessing what is going on in their souls.

== Reception ==
The stories were praised by A. G. Mojtabai in a review published by The New York Times in 1981: "Where the Jackals Howl is a strong, beautiful, disturbing book. It speaks piercingly -whether wittingly or unwittingly, I know not - of a dimension of the Israeli experience not often discussed, of the specter of the other brother, of a haunting, an unhealed wound; it reminds us of polarizations everywhere that bind and diminish us, that may yet rend us."

In 1991, Jay Parini wrote an interview profile on Oz for The New York Times Magazine, with Parini commenting on the novel: "The eight stories in that volume have a kind of primal ferocity and emotional roughness absent from the later work, where more subtle shades of feeling are conjured. Conflicts between nomad herders and settlers, raiders and counterraiders, occur throughout the tales. Love stories mingle with hate stories, while the land of Israel itself, wind-swept and bare, becomes the main character in this fiction -- the terra firma upon which human fate is played out against a violent background."

In 2012, Adam Kirsch wrote for Tablet: "Almost 50 years after it first appeared, Where the Jackals Howl remains one of the most remorseless fictional X-rays of the Israeli soul."
