= The Hill of Evil Counsel =

1976 novel by Amos Oz

- Author: Amos Oz
- Original title: הר העצה הרעה
- Translator: Nicholas de Lange
- Language: Hebrew
- Publisher: Am Oved
- Publication date: 1976
- Publication place: Israel
- English publication date: 1978
- Pages: 210
- ISBN: 0-7011-2248-X

The Hill of Evil Counsel (Hebrew: הר העצה הרעה Har Ha'etsah Hara'ah) is a volume of three novellas by Israeli author Amos Oz and was published in 1976. The novellas are set in the Jerusalem suburb of Tel Arza, spanning between the period of the Second World War to 1947, shortly before the Establishment of the State of Israel.

The title story was published in Commentary in April 1978.

== Plot ==
=== The Hill of Evil Counsel ===
In the first novella and title story, the attractive wife of a veterinarian, Dr. Kipnis is nostalgic for her earlier life Poland, where she was courted by impressive cavalry officers." She is unhappy in the harsh middle eastern heat and tires of the conversation among the men and retreats into her world of piano and Chopin."

Following a ball at the British High Commissioner's residence on the Hill of Evil Counsel, Dr. Kipnis searches for her his wife, who is being courted by a British admiral and womanizer." His wife never returns to the marital home. Their son, Hillel is sent to live on a kibbutz, where he is raised."

=== Mr. Levy ===
Mr Nehamkin, an older man and poet dreams of a Jerusalem where there lurks beneath a secret green sea." Meanwhile, his son, Ephraim is in the underground and therefore only appears at the home sporadically to sleep in the afternoon." His sleeping quarters are guarded by Mr Nehamkin and a boy, Uri Kolodny from the legion of women that have fallen in love with him." Ephraim has violent, disturbing dreams of destruction on earth." Uri becomes preoccupied by his plots to expel the British, who stand in the way of the establishment of a Jewish state."

=== Longing ===
The third and final story is composed of letters from Dr. Nussbaum, who is dying of cancer to Mina, a woman with whom he had an affair. He volunteers his scientific expertise to support a report for David Ben-Gurion and other prominent pioneers on way to create cheap explosives.

== Reception ==
The volume was praised by Richard R. Lingeman in The New York Times in 1978: "Mr. Oz's words, his sensuous prose and indelible imagery, the people he flings living onto his pages, evokes a cauldron of sentiments at the boil; yet his human vision is capacious enough to contain the destruction and hope for peace expressed in Dr. Nussbaum's last words to Mina: "Good night. Everything will be all right." He has caught a welter of fears, curses and dreams at a watershed moment in history, when an uneasy, restless waiting gave way to an upsurge of violence, of fearsome consequences. The power of his art fuses historical fact and symbol; he makes the ancient stones of Jerusalem speak, and the desert beyond a place of jackals and miracles."
