= Sigmund Maybaum =

Rabbi Sigmund Maybaum

Personal life
- Born: 29 April 1844 Miskolc, Austrian Empire
- Died: 31 July 1919 (aged 75) Berlin, Germany

Religious life
- Religion: Judaism
- Denomination: Reform Judaism

Sigmund Maybaum (April 29, 1844 – July 31, 1919) was a German Reform rabbi who served in Dolný Kubín, Žatec, Miskolc, and Berlin. He was an opponent of the Zionist movement.

== Early life ==
Maybaum was born in Miskolc, Austrian Empire, on 29 April 1844. His nephew was the rabbi and theologian Ignaz Maybaum. Maybaum studied as a yeshiva student as the Eisenstadt yeshiva and the Pressburg Yeshiva.

== Career ==
Maybaum received semikhah from the Jewish Theological Seminary of Breslau in 1871. His ordination was signed by Zacharias Frankel, the seminary's director. From 1870 to 1873, he served as a rabbi in Dolný Kubín in what is now Slovakia (then part of Austria-Hungary). Between 1873 and 1881, he served as a rabbi in Žatec in Bohemia. He served as a congregational leader in Berlin from 1881 until his death in 1919.

In 1897, Maybaum and another Liberal rabbi, Heinemann Vogelstein of Stettin, vocalized their opposition to Zionism and the First Zionist Congress which was to be held in Basel, Switzerland. Maybaum and Vogelstein were worried that the Zionist movement could undermine the rights of Jewish citizens of the German Reich. On 11 June 1897 a group of Liberal and Orthodox rabbis wrote a letter to Allgemeine Zeitung des Judentums detailing their objections to Zionism. The letter was written by the executive committee of the Union of Rabbis Germany, which included Rabbi Maybaum, as well as Dr. Marcus Horovitz of Frankfurt, Dr. Jacob Guttmann of Breslau, Dr. Aviezri Auerbach of Halberstadt, and Dr. Werner of Munich. In response, Theodor Herzl dubbed them the "protestrabbiner" (protest rabbis). Declaring Zionism to be "propaganda" and a "calamity", the rabbis attempted to stop the First Zionist Conference from being held in Germany and were opposed to the establishment of Herzl's Die Welt. The rabbis objected to the fact that the newspaper was written in German, rather than Hebrew. Arguing in favor of patriotism and assimilation, the letter stated their beliefs that "the Jews comprise a separate community solely with respect to religion" rather than nationality, that Jews are obligated to follow the laws of their country of residence, and that Zionism contradicted the "messianic promises of Judaism". Due to the objections of the Munich Jewish community, Herzl decided to move the First Zionist Congress from Munich to Basel.

== Death ==
Maybaum died on 31 July 1919 in Berlin.
