= Suddenly in the Depth of the Forest =

2005 literary piece by Amos Oz

First edition (Hebrew)

Suddenly in the Depth of the Forest (Hebrew: פתאום בעומק היער: אגדה) is a literary piece written by Amos Oz in Hebrew in 2005. The full title is Suddenly in the Depth of the Forest (A Fable for all ages). The English translation by Sondra Silverston was published in 2010.

== Plot summary ==
The plot takes place in an unnamed village which is cursed because all the animals were taken from the past by Nehi the Mountain Demon. The adult population is afraid of this demon and nobody ever walks out outside after dark. The adults refuse even to talk about the animals and about the past of the village to their children. Two of the children, Maya and Matti, who were born after the exodus of the animals and who have never seen a living animal, decide to investigate the matter and find Nehi, who is in fact a human and a former inhabitant of the village who was humiliated on a regular basis and decided to leave, taking along all of the animals. Maya. Matti, and Nehi hold a conversation about his motivations, he proposes the children to stay at his place, but finally they decide to return to the village and try to convince the villagers to stop humiliating each other. The fable ends by showing Maya and Matti reentering the village.

The piece is written as a fable. Different allusions such as the Holocaust were suggested in various reviews, but they are not explicit in the piece itself.
