= Ignaz Maybaum =

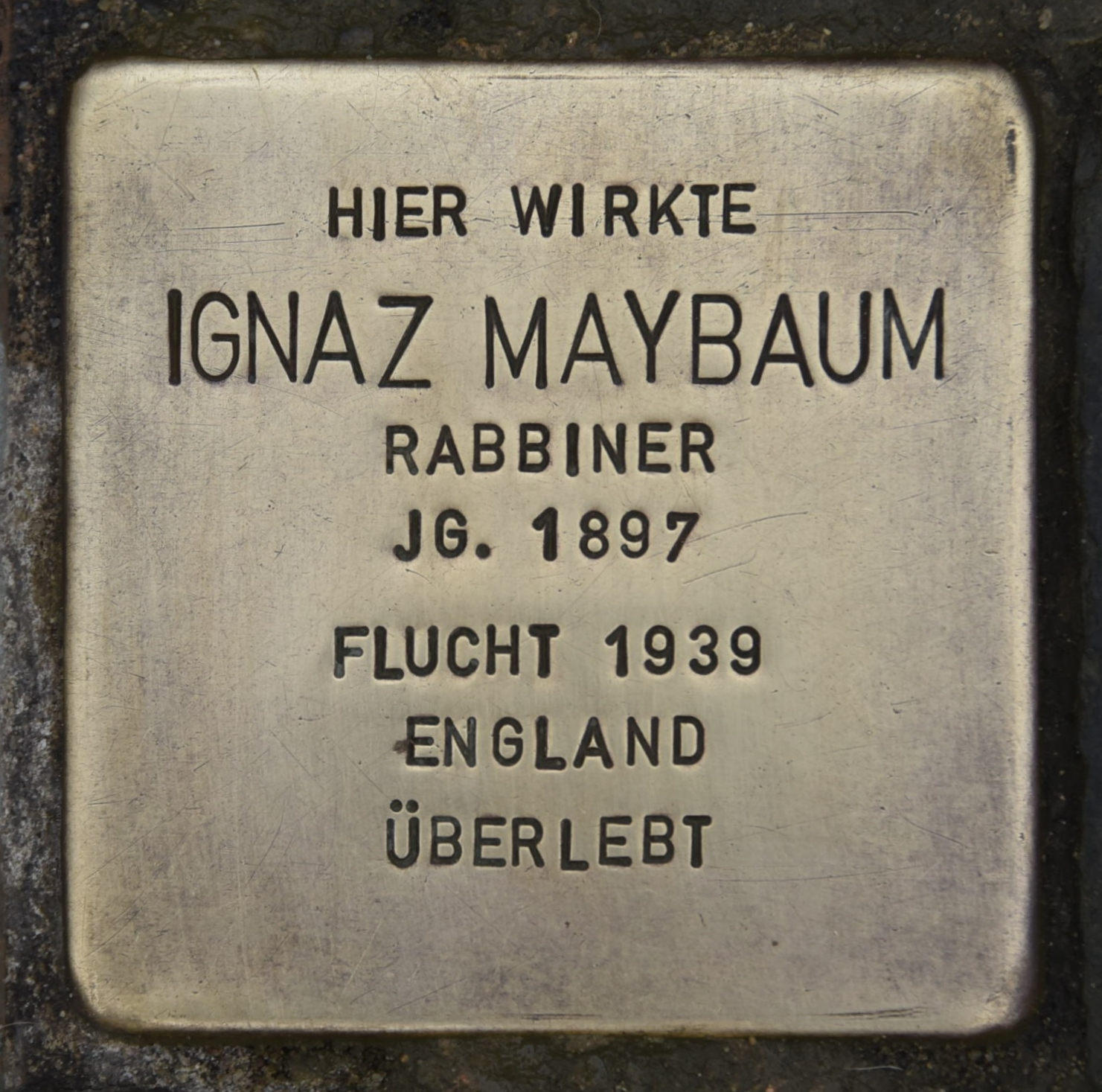
- Stolperstein commemorating Maybaum
- Born: 2 March 1897; Vienna, Austria-Hungary
- Died: 12 June 1976 (aged 79); London, United Kingdom

Ignaz Maybaum (2 March 1897 – 12 June 1976) was a rabbi and 20th-century liberal Jewish theologian.

== Life ==
Maybaum was born in Vienna in 1897. His uncle was the rabbi Sigmund Maybaum. He studied in Berlin at the Hochschule für die Wissenschaft des Judentums, where he was ordained as a rabbi in 1926. He took rabbinic posts in Bingen, Frankfurt an der Oder and Berlin. He was a disciple of Franz Rosenzweig.

In 1935 he was arrested by the Gestapo, spending six weeks in prison before being released. Leaving Germany in 1938, Maybaum was given work in the United Synagogue by the British Chief Rabbi, Joseph Hertz. His mother and sisters were killed in the Holocaust.

In 1949 he became rabbi of Edgware and District Reform Synagogue. From 1956 until his retirement in 1963, he lectured in homiletics and theology at Leo Baeck College. He was also active in inter-religious dialogue. His students include Nicholas de Lange.

== Holocaust theology ==
Maybaum wrote many reflections on Judaism, Christianity, the Holocaust and Zionism. He also wrote on Islam. He is most frequently remembered for his controversial view in The Face of God After Auschwitz (1965) that the suffering of Jews in the Holocaust was vicarious atonement for the sins of the rest of the world. He was connecting the Jewish people to the figure of the "suffering servant" of Isaiah 52 and 53 in the Tanakh . In the same work he employed Christian imagery, speaking of Auschwitz as the new Golgotha and the gas chambers as replacing the cross.

== Works ==
- Parteibefreites Judentum (1935)
- Neue Jugend und Alter Glaube (1936)

Published in 1936, Neue Jugend und Alter Glaube which translates to "New Youth and Old Faith". Neue Jugend und Alter Glaube explores theological and religious aspects of the Holocaust, by examining the existence of Jewish people both in Diaspora as well as their ancient homeland.

- Man and Catastrophe (1941)

Published in 1941 by Allenson, Man and Catastrophe is about the suffering and resilient's of Jewish people during the Holocaust. In the book Maybaum focueses on the struggle that Jewish people faced with their faith during this time.

- Synagogue and Society: Jewish-Christian Collaboration in the Defence of Western Civilization (1944)
- The Jewish Home (1945)

Published in 1945 and translated by Tilly Barnett and L.V. Snowman from the German manuscript in 1973, The Jewish Home talks about the customs, practices, and social life's of Jewish families. As well as their religious life's and family dynamics.

- The Jewish Mission (1949)
- Jewish Existence (1960)

Published in 1961, Jewish Existence is an essay that was written about the specific characteristics of Jewish Existence.

- The Faith of the Jewish Diaspora (1962)
- The Face of God After Auschwitz (1965)

Published in 1965 by Polak and Van Gennep, The Face of God After Auschwitz is a book the explains the Holocaust using the term "the suffering servant" from a prophecy from Isaiah. The book talks about how during the Holocaust Jewish people had become an image of "the suffering servant".

- Trialogue Between Jew, Christian, and Muslim (1973)
- Happiness Outside the State (1980)
- Ignaz Maybaum: A Reader, Nicholas de Lange (ed.), New York and Oxford: Berghahn Books (2001)
