= A Perfect Peace =

1982 novel by Israeli author Amos Oz

- First edition (Hebrew)
- Author: Amos Oz
- Original title: מנוחה נכונה
- Translator: Hillel Halkin
- Language: Hebrew
- Genre: Literary fiction
- Publisher: Harcourt Brace Jovanovich
- Publication date: 1982
- Publication place: Israel
- English publication date: 1985
- Media type: Print (hardcover)
- Pages: 374
- ISBN: 0-15-171696-X

A Perfect Peace (Hebrew: מנוחה נכונה, romanized: Mnuchah Nchonah) is a 1982 novel by Israeli author Amos Oz that was originally published in Hebrew by Am Oved. It was translated by Hillel Halkin and published in the United States by Harcourt Brace Jovanovich in 1985.

It is considered a sister novel to his earlier novel, Elsewhere, Perhaps (1966).

== Background ==
In a 1991 interview with The New York Times Magazine, Oz compared the novel to his earlier Elsewhere, Perhaps (1966), stating that the later novel "which has a much smaller cast of characters. If the broader historical context creeps in, it's done in perhaps more sophisticated ways. I don't need to mobilize so many characters to bring in the feel of kibbutz life." Oz continued: "It's a novel that travels from conflict, anger and frustration into a certain acceptance, compassion and humility -- a novel, I suppose, about co-existence."

== Plot ==
Set in Israel during the eighteen months leading up to the Six-Day War, the novel portrays life on a fictional kibbutz, Granot, where the founding generation and their children struggle to come to terms with each other and the ideological tensions within Israeli society. Oz documents the gap between the socialist dream of the founders and the strained realities of Israeli life, but it is also, according to the author, a mystical tale about "the secret merger between six or seven very different human beings who become a family in the deepest sense of the term."

== Critical reception ==
A Perfect Peace was hailed by Publishers Weekly as "magnificent" upon its release and described by The Washington Post Book World as Oz's "strangest, riskiest, and richest novel". It won the Bernstein Prize in 1983.

In a 1991 profile interview with Oz for The New York Times Magazine, Jay Parini described the novel positively: "The later novel is a deeply affecting, often painful study of father-son relations -- another of Oz's obsessive themes."
