= Eric Gurry =

American actor and entrepreneur (born 1966)

- Born: December 14, 1966 (age 58); Ridgewood, New Jersey
- Occupations: Actor; Entrepreneur
- Years active: 1979–1986
- Spouse: Suzanne Michele Mahon (m. 1994–present)
- Children: 3

Eric Gurry (born December 14, 1966) is an American former child actor and entrepreneur.

== Biography ==
Gurry graduated from the University of Pennsylvania in 1989 and obtained a Juris Doctor degree from the University of Chicago Law School.

He is known for his roles in films and plays. In 1982, he starred in the film Author! Author!, a role that earned praise. He co-starred in the 1983 film Bad Boys opposite Sean Penn, receiving praise for his portrayal of 15-year-old criminal Horowitz. He also appeared in the 1986 comedy film Willy/Milly.

Gurry's theater credits include the off-Broadway comedy Table Settings (1980) and Woody Allen's Broadway play The Floating Light Bulb (1981), with Beatrice Arthur, Danny Aiello and Jack Weston. Gurry also appeared in a handful of TV series and TV movies in his career.

== Filmography ==
| Year | Title | Role | Notes |
|---|---|---|---|
| 1979 | The Baby with Four Fathers | Horse | TV movie |
| 1981 | CBS Children's Mystery Theatre | Jess | TV series; Episode: Mystery at Fire Island |
| 1982 | Author! Author! | Igor | Film |
| 1983 | Bad Boys | Horowitz | Film |
| 1983 | Full House | Igor Travalian | TV movie |
| 1985 | The Zoo Gang | Danny | Film |
| 1986 | Willy/Milly | Alfie | Film |
