= Willy/Milly =

1986 film by Paul Schneider

Something Special
- VHS cover with the second title of "Something Special"
- Directed by: Paul Schneider
- Written by: Walter Carbone, Carla Reuben
- Story by: Alan H. Friedman
- Based on: Willy Milly by Alan Friedman
- Starring: Pamela Segall; Eric Gurry; John Glover; Patty Duke
- Cinematography: David McHugh
- Edited by: Michael R. Miller
- Music by: Dominique Chapuis
- Distributed by: Imageworks / CRC Production
- Release date: November 14, 1986
- Running time: 86 minutes
- Country: United States
- Language: English
- Box office: $235,262

Something Special (also known as Willy/Milly and I Was a Teenage Boy) is a 1986 comedic fantasy film directed by Paul Schneider, based upon a short story by the same name by Alan H. Friedman. The film follows the title character of Milly Niceman, a young tomboy who is unhappy with the traditional expectations for her gender and longs to become a boy so she can act however she wants. Initially released as I Was a Teenage Boy in 1986, the film was later re-titled to Something Special for a 1987 limited theatrical release and for a VHS release.

== Plot ==
Milly Niceman is a fourteen-year-old girl who has grown frustrated with her mother's attempts to curtail her tomboyish nature. Her mother, Doris, believes that Milly's actions are inappropriate for a girl, and that she'd be better off showing more interest in dances and dresses. When her best friend's younger brother, Malcolm, sells her a spell that will grant her deepest wish, that will only work during the upcoming eclipse, Milly jumps at the chance. She performs the spell, and believes that it has failed. The next morning, Milly discovers that not only was the spell successful, but it turned her into a boy. She tells her family about what happened, and to her surprise, her father encourages her to explore her new masculinity.

As a result, Milly changes her name to "Willy", and begins attending a new school as a transfer student. Milly initially takes well to her new persona and gender, but eventually becomes conflicted when she begins to realize that life isn't necessarily easier as a boy and that she has feelings for her friend Alfie, who is equally confused about his feelings for "Willy". By the film's end, Milly decides to become female once more. Malcolm sells Milly a wishing stone that she is to throw at her favorite star at 12:03 during a star shower. She turns back into a girl again.

== Cast ==
- Pamela Adlon as Milly / Willy Niceman (as Pamela Segall)
- Eric Gurry as Alfie
- Mary Tanner Bailey as Stephanie (as Mary Tanner)
- John Glover as Fred Niceman
- Patty Duke as Doris Niceman
- Seth Green as Malcolm
- JD Cullum as Tom
- Corey Parker as Lopez
- Jeb Ellis-Brown as Harry
- Taryn Grimes as Cynthia
- Diane Bogino as Doctor #1
- Milton Chaikin as Doctor #2
- Bobby Emmrich as Luke
- Mike McGehee as Smiley
- Robin Jackson as Witch

== Reception ==
Providence Journal commented that the film could have worked it if had been "played for hilarious farce a la Tootsie, or as an examination of the psychological traumas that [Milly]/Willy undergoes". The Sun-Sentinel panned the film as "so shallow, boring and half-baked that one wonders if anyone looked at the finished product before distribution". The Daily News of Los Angeles and Los Angeles Times both gave mixed reviews for the Willy/Milly, with the Los Angeles Times remarking that while the film "doesn't really function well as a comedy" it did have some appeal.
