= Dana Amir =

Israeli poet, psychologist

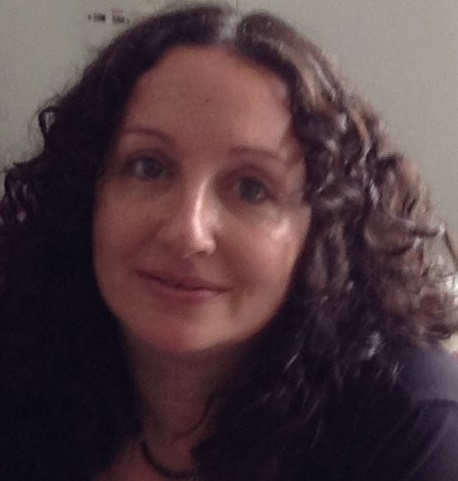
Amir in 2014

Dana Amir (Hebrew: דנה אמיר; born 1966) is a full professor at Haifa University, clinical psychologist, psychoanalyst, poet and literature researcher.

== Biography ==
Dana Amir was born and raised in Haifa and attended the Hebrew Reali School. She has a B.A. in psychology and philosophy, M.A. in clinical psychology, and Ph.D in the philosophy of psychoanalysis. She wrote her PhD thesis on The Lyrical Dimension of Mental Space. All degrees were obtained from Haifa University.

Dana Amir is a clinical psychologist, training and supervising psychoanalyst, at the International Psychoanalytic Association and at the Israel Psychoanalytic Society. She is a full professor, vice dean for research and head of the interdisciplinary doctoral program in psychoanalysis, department of counseling and human development at Haifa University, and the editor-in-chief of Maarag - the Israel Annual of Psychoanalysis (published by the Hebrew University).

Her research, which received the Israel Science Foundation research grant more than once, focuses on the connection between language and psychopathology. Amir developed several psycho-linguistic concepts which map various pathological dimensions: "Pseudo-Language" versus "Concrete Language", "Psychotic Syntax", "Autistic Syntax", "The Chameleon Language of perversion" and "the inner function of the witness". She is also researching modes of traumatic testimony, and the language of the perpetrator.

== Poetry ==
Dana Amir published seven poetry books, and her poems were published in various journals in Hebrew as well as in Anthologies in French and Spanish.

According to the prize committee, Amir’s book includes a new poetic division and a poetry essay inspired by Rilke’s Duineser Elegien. The committee noted that the collection reflects the development of Amir’s poetic work and emphasizes dialogical and introspective elements in her poetry.

== Awards ==
=== Literary ===
- 1993 - The Adler National Poetry Prize
- 2012 - The Prime-Minister National Prize for Hebrew Literature
- 2013 - Nathan Alterman poetry prize for All My Names

=== Academic ===
- 2006 - The Bahat Prize for Academic Original Book
- 2011 - The Frances Tustin International Memorial Prize
- 2013 - The IPA (International Psychoanalytic Association) Sacerdoti Prize
- 2017 - Distinguished Psychoanalytic Educators Award for Outstanding Contributions to Psychoanalytic Education
- 2017 - The IPA (International Psychoanalytic Association) Hayman Prize
- 2020 - The Outstanding Senior Researcher Award of the University of Haifa
- 2020 - The annual International Journal of Applied Psychoanalytic Studies prize for the best paper published in 2020.
- 2025 - The IPA (International Psychoanalytic Association) Hayman Prize
- 2025 - The International Sigourney Award

== Selected works ==
=== Psychoanalytic non-fiction books ===
- Amir, D. (2008). On the Lyricism of the Mind, Haifa University and Magness Press, Jerusalem (Hebrew), Winner of the Bahat Prize, 2006. 110 pp.
  - Amir, D. (2016). On the Lyricism of the Mind: Psychoanalysis and Literature. New York: Routledge. (Translated from Hebrew). 100 pp.
- Amir, D. (2013). Cleft Tongue: A Psychoanalytic Study of Psychopathology and Language. Magness Press, Jerusalem. (Hebrew). Published with the support of The Israel Science Foundation (ISF). 182 pp.
  - Amir, D. (2014). Cleft Tongue: The Language of Psychic Structures. New-York and London: Karnac Books. (Translated from Hebrew with back cover text by Professor Alessandra Lemma, Unit Director, Psychological Therapies Development Unit, Tavistock Center). 161 pp.
- Amir, D. (2018). Bearing Witness to the Witness: A Psychoanalytic Perspective on Four Modes of Traumatic Testimony. London & New-York: Routledge (foreword by prof. Dori Laub). 170 pp.
  - Amir, D. (2018). Bearing Witness to the Witness: Four Modes of Traumatic Testimony. Jerusalem: Magness (Hebrew translation from English). Published with the support of the Research Authority of the University of Haifa. Published Verse (Hebrew) 236 pp.
- Amir, D. (2020). Screen Confessions. Resling (Hebrew) 160 pp.
  - Amir, D. (2021). Psychoanalysis on the Verge of Language: Clinical Cases on the Edge. New York and London: Routledge. (Translated from Hebrew) 110 pp.
- Amir, D. (2023). The Exile from Speech. Resling (Hebrew) 142 pp.
- Amir, D. (2024). Psychoanalysis as Radical Hospitality. New-York & London: Routledge.
- Amir, D. Grief Has No End (2026). Tel-Aviv: Bookworm (Hebrew). 92 pp.
- Amir, D. Sobre soltar a língua: A voz humana diante do insuportável (2016): Blucher, Portugal, 2026

=== Published verse (books in Hebrew) ===
- Amir, D. (1993). Now, in this Sweetness. Tel-Aviv: Sifriat Hapo'alim.
- Amir, D. (1998). Until the Earth Comes. Tel-Aviv: Hakibbutz Hame'uhad.
- Amir, D. (2004). The Life of Ahino'am. Tel-Aviv: Rhythmus-Hakibbutz Hame'uhad.
- Amir, D. (2007). Poems of Innig. Tel-Aviv: Rhythmus-Hakibbutz Hame'uhad.
- Amir, D. All My Names (2014). Selected Poems. Tel-Aviv: Hakibitz Hameuhad.
- Amir, D. Rending (2016). Ra'anana: Even Hoshen.
- Amir, D. Kaddish on Light and Darkness (2019). Tel-Aviv: Afik.
- Amir, D. Millstones (2021). Tel-Aviv: Afik.
- Amir, D. Her Weight In Me (2023). Tel-Aviv: Afik.
- Amir, D. And Onward (2024). Tel-Aviv: Tarsat.
- Amir, D. The Origin of Ways (2025). Tel-Aviv: Hakibbutz Hame'uhad.
