= Amnon Jackont =

Israeli writer and historian

- אמנון ז'קונט
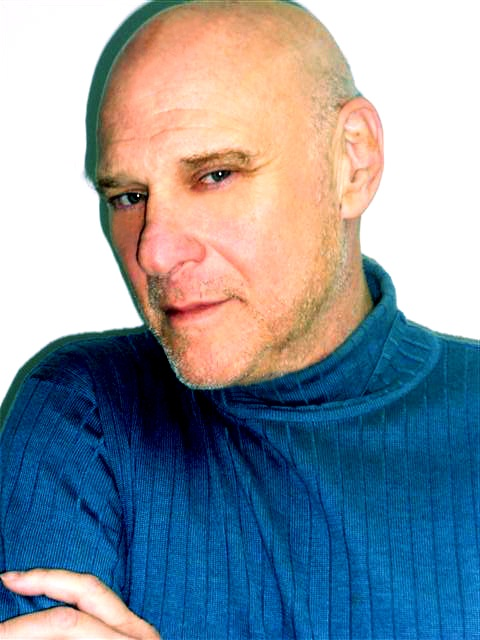
- Born: 1948 (age 77–78); Ramat Gan, Israel
- Education: Hebrew University of Jerusalem, Tel Aviv University
- Occupations: Author, Historian, Literary Editor
- Known for: Thrillers, Literary Editing
- Spouse: Varda Rasiel-Jackont

Amnon Jackont (Hebrew: אמנון ז'קונט; born 1948 in Ramat Gan) is an Israeli author of thrillers, a historian and a literary editor.

Jackont studied law at the Hebrew University of Jerusalem doing his military service in the summer breaks. After working in real estate, investments and insurance, he began to write. Many of his books became bestsellers. From 1988 he worked as a literary editor for the Keter Publishing House.

In 1997 Jackont ceased his business activities to concentrate on writing, editing and history studies at Tel Aviv University. After completing his masters (2002), he earned a PhD degree from the same university (2006).

From 2002 he engaged in relationship counseling, in workshops and TV programs. Some of these are conducted with his wife, radio show hostess Varda Rasiel-Jackont. Amnon and Varda Jackont live in Tel Aviv.

== Trojan horse exposure ==
In 2005, Jackont helped expose an industrial espionage ring involving executives at several major Israeli corporations. During the previous year, he had noticed excerpts from an unpublished manuscript appearing in internet forums, followed by a series of harsh reviews once the book was actually published. He also determined that his email was being read and manipulated by someone else.

When a computer technician found that the problem was a Trojan horse program on his computer, Jackont reported the matter to police. The person responsible was eventually identified as Michael Haephrati, the ex-husband of Varda's daughter from a previous marriage, who had apparently written the Trojan horse. The same program was identified as having been used by three private detective agencies to collect information from the espionage victims on behalf of their competitors.

== Bibliography ==
=== Hebrew ===
- Pesek-Zeman (Borrowed Time) (Israel: Am Oved, 1982) ISBN 965-13-0115-5.
- Malkodet Devash (Honey Trap) (Israel: Keter Publishing, 1984) ISBN 965-07-0363-2.
- Ish ha-sagrir: Sifre penai (The Rainy-Day Man) (Israel: Am Oved, 1987) ISBN 965-13-0475-8.
- Aharon ha-meahavim ha-hakhamim (Last of the Wise Lovers) (Israel: Keter Publishing, 1991) ISBN 965-07-0165-6.
- Mukhan le-hayim: Sipurim: Keter ketsarim (Ready for Life: Stories) (Israel: Keter Publishing, 2000) ISBN 965-07-0915-0.
- Mavo Le-Ahava (Introduction to Love) (Israel: Keter Publishing, 2001)
- With Varda Rasiel Jacont: Shin Kmo Sheker (L as in Lies) (Israel: Keter Publishing, 2004)
- Hidath Moti (The Riddle of my Death) (Israel: Keter Publishing, 2009)
- Over Va-Shav (Resurgence - A financial documentary story) (Israel: Yedioth Aharonoth Books, 2009)
- Meir Amit – Ha-ish ve-ha-Mosad (Meir Amit - A Man and Mossad) (Israel: Yedioth Ahronoth Books, 2012)

=== English ===
- Borrowed Time (UK: Hamish Hamilton, 1986, ISBN 0-241-11847-6) (USA: Trafalgar Square, 1988, ISBN 0-241-11875-1)
