= A Tale of Love and Darkness =

Memoir by Israeli author Amos Oz

- First edition (Hebrew)
- Author: Amos Oz
- Language: Hebrew
- Genre: Nonfiction novel
- Publisher: Houghton Mifflin Harcourt
- Publication date: 2002
- Publication place: Israel
- English publication date: November 15, 2004
- Media type: Print, e-book, audiobook
- Pages: 544 pages (English hardcover)
- Awards: National Jewish Book Award
- ISBN: 978-0151008780

A Tale of Love and Darkness (Hebrew: סיפור על אהבה וחושך Sipur al ahava ve choshech) is a memoir by the Israeli author Amos Oz, first published in Hebrew in 2002.

The book has been translated into 28 languages and over a million copies have been sold worldwide. In 2011, a bootleg Kurdish translation was found in a bookstore in northern Iraq. Oz was reportedly delighted.

== Background ==
The book documents much of Oz's early life, and includes a family history researched by an uncle of his father. It describes a number of events he previously hadn't communicated. For example, before writing the book, Oz had avoided discussing his mother's 1952 suicide with his father, or writing publicly about it.

== Summary ==
Oz chronicles his childhood in Jerusalem in the last years of Mandatory Palestine and the early years of the State of Israel. The love and darkness of his title refer to his mother, whose suffering from severe depression led her to take her own life when he was a boy. The book is an effort to describe Oz's feelings for his mother and the pain of losing her. After her death he spent his teenage years on Kibbutz Hulda.

His parents, mother Fania Mussman and father Ariyeh Klausner, feature as prominent characters within the book. Importantly, his mother's 1952 overdose of sleeping pills becomes the point of exploration for the work, launching the deep probing into other parts of his childhood and youth. As a child, he crossed paths with prominent figures in Israeli society, among them Shmuel Yosef Agnon, Shaul Tchernichovsky, and David Ben-Gurion. One of his teachers was the Israeli poet Zelda. Historian Joseph Klausner was his great-uncle.

Told in a non-linear fashion, Oz's story is interwoven with tales of his family's Eastern European roots. The original family name was Klausner. By changing his own name to a Hebrew one, Oz separated himself from his father.

== Film adaptation ==
A production company owned by Natalie Portman acquired the film rights to the book. Portman began shooting the movie in February 2014 in Jerusalem. The film marks her directorial feature film debut and she also plays the role of Oz's mother; Slawomir Idziak is director of photography and Amir Tessler played the young Oz.

== Translations ==
Elias Khoury, a Palestinian-Israeli lawyer whose father Daoud was a victim in a suicide bombing of Zion Square and whose son George was shot to death by Palestinian militants who mistook him for a Jew (see George Khoury), paid to have the book translated into Arabic and distributed in Beirut and other Arab cities in order to promote better understanding of the Jewish people's narrative of national rebirth.

The English translation was done by Nicholas de Lange and published by Houghton Mifflin Harcourt in 2004. The translation was praised by New York Magazine's book reviewer Boris Kacha as "preserving the author’s gorgeous, discursive style and his love of wordplay."

== Reception ==
Sales of the book were also high, with The Guardian Reviewer Linda Grant describing the book as the "biggest selling literary work in Israeli history." Grant describes the book as "one of the funniest, most tragic and most touching books I have ever read," and " a testament to a family, a time and a place."

New York magazine reviewer Boris Kachika described the book as very well written, though "sometimes meandering," but all in all a "sophisticated and searing memorial." The Jewish Book Council reviewer, Maron L. Waxmon called it "a masterful double memoir" of both himself and "Israel's birth and early years." For Waxman, "This is an important and richly rewarding book, sensitively told and filled with memorably drawn characters."

== Controversy ==
In March 2011, Oz sent imprisoned former Tanzim leader Marwan Barghouti a copy of his book A Tale of Love and Darkness in Arabic translation with his personal dedication in Hebrew: “This story is our story, I hope you read it and understand us as we understand you, hoping to see you outside and in peace, yours, Amos Oz”. The gesture was criticized by members of rightist political parties, among them Likud MK Tzipi Hotovely. Assaf Harofeh Hospital canceled Oz's invitation to give the keynote speech at an awards ceremony for outstanding physicians in the wake of this incident, leading to widespread criticism of the "small-minded" hospital.

== Awards and honours ==
- 2005: JQ Wingate Prize, nonfiction
- 2005: Koret Jewish Book Award, biography, autobiography or literary study
- 2005: National Jewish Book Awards for Jewish Book of the Year
