= Zelda (poet) =

Israeli poet (1914–1984)

- זלדה שניאורסון-מישקובסקי
- Born: Zelda Schneurson; June 20, 1914
- Died: April 30, 1984 (aged 69)
- Occupation: Poet
- Writing career
- Language: Hebrew

Zelda Schneurson Mishkovsky (Hebrew: זלדה שניאורסון-מישקובסקי; June 20, 1914 – April 30, 1984), widely known as Zelda, was an Israeli poet. She received three awards for her published works.

== Biography ==
Zelda Schneerson (later Mishkovsky) was born in Chernigov, Chernigov Governorate, Russian Empire (now Chernihiv, Ukraine), the daughter of Sholom Schneerson and Rachel Hen. Her father was the great-great-grandson of the third Lubavitcher Rebbe, Menachem Mendel Schneersohn. The family settled in Jerusalem in 1926. Her mother, Rachel Hen, was a daughter of Rabbi Dovid Tzvi Chein of Chernigov and a descendant of the Sephardic dynasty of Hen-Gracian, which traces its roots to 11th century Barcelona.

Zelda attended a religious school for girls in British Palestine, and then studied at the Teachers' College of the Mizrachi movement. After graduating in 1932, she moved to Tel Aviv and then to Haifa, where she taught until her return to Jerusalem in 1935. In Jerusalem, she also worked as a schoolteacher. In 1950 she married Hayim Mishkovsky and from then on devoted herself to writing. One of her students was Amos Klausner, later the novelist Amos Oz, who writes in his memoir A Tale of Love and Darkness that he had a schoolboy crush on her. Years after graduation, he visited her at home (she was still living at the same address) and was deeply touched that she still remembered how he liked her lemonade.

Zelda's first cousin was Rabbi Menachem Mendel Schneerson, the seventh Chabad Rebbe.

== Literary career ==
Penai (Free Time), her first collection of poetry, was published in 1967. With its emotive and contemplative images drawn from the world of Jewish mysticism, Hasidism, and Russian fairy tales, this collection established her reputation in the literary world. Her poems, highly spiritual but at same time very direct, colorful, and precise, appealed to both religious and secular people. Zelda's poetry is imbued with deep faith, free of the doubt and irony that sometimes permeates the work of other modern Hebrew poets. Her poems reflect her abiding faith – for example in Kaasher berakhti 'al hanerot – "When I said the blessing over the Shabbat candles" ("כאשר ברכתי על הנרות").

In 2004, a collection of Zelda's poetry appeared in English translation: The Spectacular Difference: Selected Poems of Zelda, translated and edited by Marcia Falk (Hebrew Union College Press).

== Awards and recognition ==
- 1971 – Brenner Prize
- 1974 – Prime Minister's Prize for Hebrew Literary Works
- 1978 – Bialik Prize for Literature
- 1982 – Wertheim Prize

== Published works ==
- Ha-Carmel ha-Ee Nireh (The Invisible Carmel) (1971)
- Al Tirhak (Be Not Far) (1975)
- Halo Har Halo Esh (Surely a Mountain, Surely a Fire) (1977)
- Al ha-Shoni ha-Marhiv (On the Spectacular Difference) (1981)
- Shenivdelu Mikol Merhaq (That Became Separated from Every Distance) (1985)
- The Spectacular Difference: Selected Poems of Zelda, translated, with introduction and notes, by Marcia Falk (2004)

== See also ==
- Culture of Israel
- Hebrew literature
- List of Bialik Prize recipients
