= List of submissions to the 48th Academy Awards for Best Foreign Language Film =

1975 Best Foreign Language Film submissions

Highlights
- Oscar winner: (Soviet Union) Dersu Uzala
- Submissions: 21
- Debuts: none

This is a list of submissions to the 48th Academy Awards for Best Foreign Language Film. The Academy Award for Best Foreign Language Film was created in 1956 by the Academy of Motion Picture Arts and Sciences to honour non-English-speaking films produced outside the United States. The award is handed out annually, and is accepted by the winning film's director, although it is considered an award for the submitting country as a whole. Countries are invited by the academy to submit their best films for competition according to strict rules, with only one film being accepted from each country.

For the 48th Academy Awards, twenty-one films were submitted in the category Academy Award for Best Foreign Language Film. The five nominated films came from Italy, Japan, Mexico, Poland and the Soviet Union.

The Soviet Union won for the second time with Dersu Uzala by Akira Kurosawa.

== Submissions ==
Submitting country	Film title used in nomination	Original title	Language(s)	Director(s)	Result
Algeria	Chronicle of the Years of Fire	وقائع سنين الجمر	Algerian Arabic, French	Mohammed Lakhdar-Hamina	Not nominated
Argentina	Nazareno Cruz and the Wolf	Nazareno Cruz y el lobo, las palomas y los gritos	Spanish, Quechua	Leonardo Favio	Not nominated
Brazil	Ogum's Amulet	O Amuleto de Ogum	Brazilian Portuguese	Nelson Pereira dos Santos	Not nominated
Canada	Orders	Les Ordres	French	Michel Brault	Not nominated
Czechoslovakia	Circus in the Circus	Cirkus v cirkuse	Czech, Russian	Oldřich Lipský	Not nominated
Denmark	Per		Danish	Hans Kristensen	Not nominated
Egypt	I Want a Solution	أريد حلاً	Egyptian Arabic	Said Marzouk	Not nominated
France	India Song		French	Marguerite Duras	Not nominated
West Germany	Every Man For Himself and God Against All	Jeder für sich und Gott gegen alle	German, English	Werner Herzog	Not nominated
Greece	The Travelling Players	Ο Θίασος	Greek	Theodoros Angelopoulos	Not nominated
Hungary	Adoption	Örökbefogadás	Hungarian	Márta Mészáros	Not nominated
Israel	My Michael	מיכאל שלי	Hebrew	Dan Wolman	Not nominated
Italy	Scent of a Woman	Profumo di donna	Italian	Dino Risi	Nominated
Japan	Sandakan No. 8	サンダカン八番娼館 望郷	Japanese	Kei Kumai	Nominated
Mexico	Letters from Marusia	Actas de Marusia	Spanish	Miguel Littín	Nominated
Netherlands	Dr. Pulder Sows Poppies	Dokter Pulder zaait papavers	Dutch	Bert Haanstra	Not nominated
Poland	Land of Promise	Ziemia obiecana	Polish, German	Andrzej Wajda	Nominated
Soviet Union	Dersu Uzala	Дерсу Узала / デルス·ウザーラ	Russian, Mandarin, Kyakhta Russian–Chinese Pidgin	Akira Kurosawa	Won Academy Award
Spain	Poachers	Furtivos	Spanish	José Luis Borau	Not nominated
Switzerland	Confrontation	Konfrontation	Swiss German, German	Rolf Lyssy	Not nominated
Yugoslavia	The Day That Shook the World	Sarajevski atentat	Czech, Serbo-Croatian, English, German	Veljko Bulajić	Not nominated

== Sources ==
- Margaret Herrick Library, Academy of Motion Picture Arts and Sciences
