= Amnon Sella =

Israeli academic

Amnon Sella (Hebrew: אמנון סלע; born 1934) is a prominent International Relations and Soviet Studies scholar and an author. He is a professor at the Herzliya Interdisciplinary Center at the Lauder School of Government, Diplomacy and Strategy. In addition he is a professor Emeritus at the Hebrew University of Jerusalem. Sella attended the University of Edinburgh and was awarded a PhD in 1973 for a thesis entitled "Surprise attack: Soviet response to German threats, December 1940 – June 1941".
