= Judas (novel) =

2014 novel by Amos Oz

- Author: Amos Oz
- Language: Hebrew
- Set in: 1959–1960 Jerusalem
- Publication date: 2014
- Publication place: Israel

Judas (Hebrew: הבשורה על-פי יהודה) is the final novel by Israeli author Amos Oz, first published in 2014. The novel's story is set in 1959–1960 Jerusalem and follows the student Shmuel Asch.

== Plot ==
Amos Oz's novel Judas unfolds in 1959–1960 Jerusalem, following Shmuel Ash, a student who becomes entangled in the lives of an elderly man, Gershom Wald, and his housemate, Atalia Abravanel. As the narrative progresses, Oz explores characters and ideas against the backdrop of Israel's history. The plot gradually reveals the dark connection between the characters, shedding light on Shealtiel Abravanel's (Atalia Abravanel's father) views on coexistence. The novel intertwines Shmuel's abandoned thesis on Jesus and Judas, offering a nuanced exploration of betrayal and political complexities.

== Main characters ==
Content in this section is translated from the existing Hebrew Wikipedia article at he:הבשורה על-פי יהודה (ספר); see its history for attribution

- Shmuel Ash - A graduate student in history and religious studies, about 24 years old, not handsome. Preparing a paper on "Jesus in the Eyes of the Jews", a member of the Socialist Renewal Circle, who is accepted for an unusual job, to sit for several hours every day with a disabled person and talk to him. Shmuel is fond of his employers and is allowed to live in the attic at first, until the moment of his injury.
- Yardena - Shmuel Ash's girlfriend who leaves him for her previous partner, Nesher Shereshevsky.
- Gershom Wald - A 70-year-old disabled person who effectively represents the Antichrist in his views that oppose any system or worldview that encourages dreams of world improvement. Considers David Ben-Gurion is the greatest personality the Jewish people have known for generations, and even calls him the Messiah. He is able to take care of himself. Needs conversation, not nursing.
- Athaliah Abarbanel - about 45 years old, "very unsweet" according to Amos Oz. She was married to Micah, Gershom's son. Micah was killed in the War of Independence, almost two years after their marriage. She is an investigator in the Civil Investigations Office. Shmuel desires and falls desperately in love with her.
- Shaltiel Yehoyachin Abarbanel - Athaliah's father who died prematurely, probably from the absolute loneliness he imposed on himself. He was a member of the provisional government. He argued with David Ben-Gurion about the very question of the establishment of the state. In his worldview, he opposed the establishment of additional states that drag nations into wars and turn people into cannon fodder. Shaltiel is a person who does not exist in the book as a living character. His presence is so intense that Shmuel Ash begins to investigate his life, his plots, and in fact, to a certain extent, identifies with him, when he receives his room, after his leg injury. Abarbanel argued that it was possible to reach an agreement with the Arabs and live in communities instead of in countries that erect inhumane fences and walls. Ben-Gurion was angry with him and asked him to decide whether he wanted to resign or be thrown out of his positions. He then chose a life of solitude. His wife left him for a man who lived in Egypt.

== Awards ==
Oz was the winner of Germany's International Literature Award for Judas.

== Excerpt ==
That's what the Jews in Israel think, because they have no notion of the limits of power. The fact is that all the power in the world cannot transform someone who hates you into someone who likes you. It can turn a foe into a slave, but not into a friend. (...) It can't settle anything and it can't solve anything. It can only stave off disaster for a while.

— Shmuel Asch
