= N-acetylmuramoyl-L-alanyl-D-glutamyl-L-lysyl-(N6-glycyl)-D-alanyl-D-alanine-diphosphoundecaprenyl-N-acetylglucosamine:glycine glycyltransferase =

N-acetylmuramoyl-L-alanyl-D-glutamyl-L-lysyl-(N^{6}-glycyl)-D-alanyl-D-alanine-diphosphoundecaprenyl-N-acetylglucosamine:glycine glycyltransferase

Identifiers
- EC no.: 2.3.2.17

Databases
- IntEnz: IntEnz view
- BRENDA: BRENDA entry
- ExPASy: NiceZyme view
- KEGG: KEGG entry
- MetaCyc: metabolic pathway
- PRIAM: profile
- PDB structures: RCSB PDB PDBe PDBsum
Search
- PMC: articles
- PubMed: articles
- NCBI: proteins

N-acetylmuramoyl-L-alanyl-D-glutamyl-L-lysyl-(N^{6}-glycyl)-D-alanyl-D-alanine-diphosphoundecaprenyl-N-acetylglucosamine:glycine glycyltransferase (EC 2.3.2.17, femA (gene)) is an enzyme with systematic name N-acetylmuramoyl-L-alanyl-D-glutamyl-L-lysyl-(N^{6}-glycyl)-D-alanyl-D-alanine-ditrans,octacis-diphosphoundecaprenyl-N-acetylglucosamine:glycine glycyltransferase. This enzyme catalyses the following chemical reaction

N-acetylmuramoyl-L-alanyl-D-isoglutaminyl-L-lysyl-(N^{6}-glycyl)-D-alanyl-D-alanine-diphospho-ditrans,octacis-undecaprenyl-N-acetylglucosamine + 2 glycyl-tRNA $\rightleftharpoons$ N-acetylmuramoyl-L-alanyl-D-isoglutaminyl-L-lysyl-(N^{6}-triglycyl)-D-alanyl-D-alanine-diphospho-ditrans,octacis-undecaprenyl-N-acetylglucosamine + 2 tRNA

This enzyme catalyses the successive transfer of two glycine moieties from charged tRNAs to N-acetylmuramoyl-L-alanyl-D-isoglutaminyl-L-lysyl-(N^{6}-glycyl)-D-alanyl-D-alanine-diphosphoundecaprenyl-N-acetylglucosamine.
