= Amos Oz =

Israeli writer, journalist and intellectual (1939–2018)

- עמוס עוז
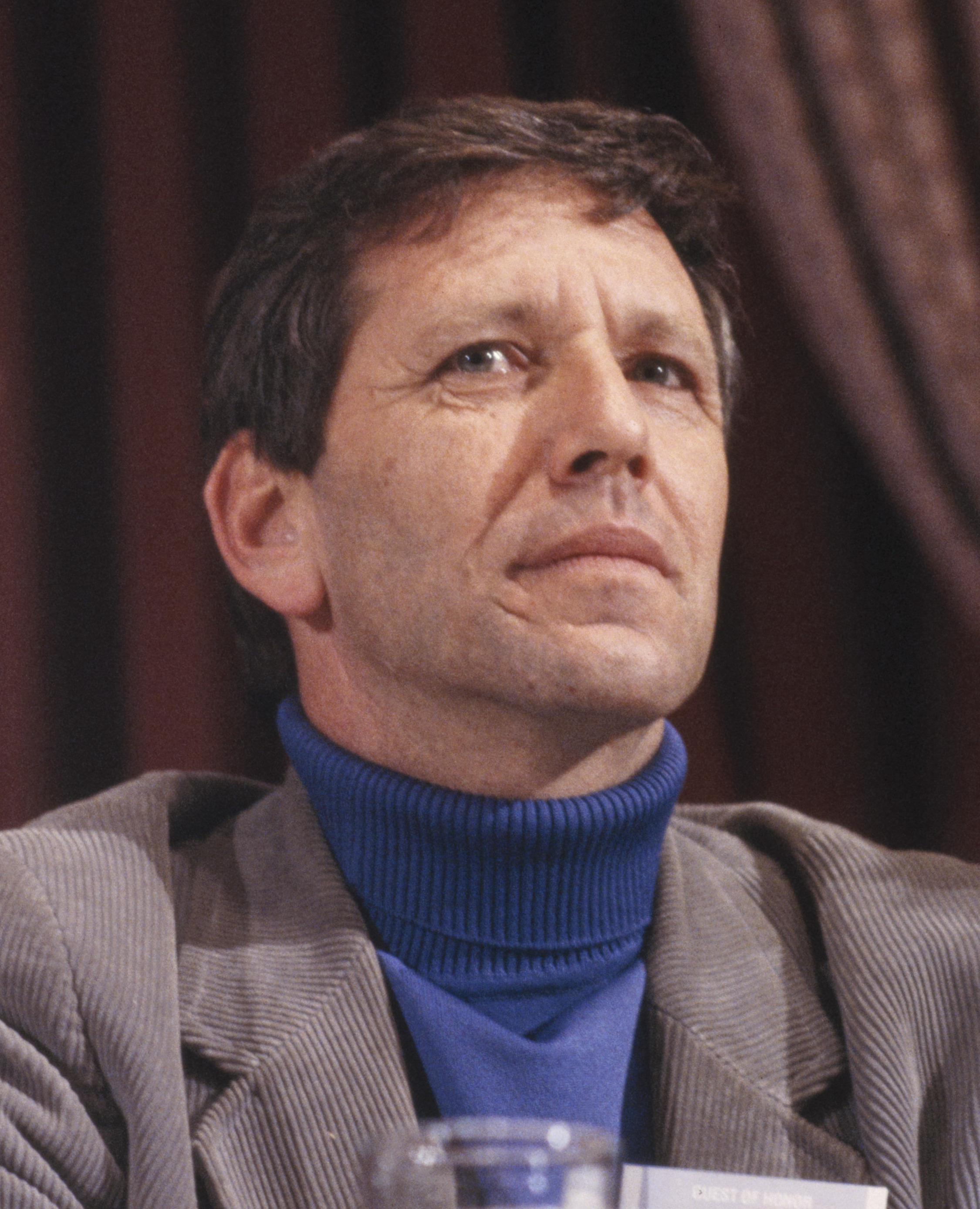
- Oz in the 1980s
- Born: Amos Klausner; 4 May 1939; Jerusalem, Mandatory Palestine
- Died: 28 December 2018 (aged 79); Petah Tikva, Israel
- Occupations: Writer; novelist; journalist; academic
- Spouse: Nily Zuckerman (m. 1960)
- Children: 3, including Fania
- Writing career
- Notable awards: Bialik Prize (1986); Friedenspreis des Deutschen Buchhandels (1992); Legion of Honour (1997); Israel Prize (1998); Ovid Prize (2004); Goethe Prize (2005); Prince of Asturias Award (2007); Heinrich Heine Prize (2008); Franz Kafka Prize (2013)

Amos Oz (Hebrew: עמוס עוז; born Amos Klausner (עמוס קלוזנר); 4 May 1939 – 28 December 2018) was an Israeli writer, novelist, journalist, and intellectual. He was also a professor of Hebrew literature at Ben-Gurion University of the Negev. From 1967 onwards, Oz was a prominent advocate of a two-state solution to the Israeli–Palestinian conflict.

He was the author of 40 books, including novels, short story collections, children's books, and essays, and his work has been published in 45 languages, more than that of any other Israeli writer. He was the recipient of many honours and awards, among them the Friedenspreis des Deutschen Buchhandels, the Legion of Honour of France, the Israel Prize, the Goethe Prize, the Prince of Asturias Award in Literature, the Heinrich Heine Prize, and the Franz Kafka Prize.

In his obituary, The New York Times called Oz one of "Israel's most prolific writers and respected intellectuals".

== Biography ==
Amos Klausner (later Oz) was born in 1939 in Jerusalem, Mandatory Palestine, where he grew up at No. 18 Amos Street in the impoverished Kerem Avraham neighborhood. He was the only child of Fania (Mussman) and Yehuda Arieh Klausner, immigrants to Mandatory Palestine who had met while studying at the Hebrew University of Jerusalem. His father's family was from Lithuania, where they had been farmers, raising cattle and vegetables near Vilnius. His father studied history and literature in Vilnius (then part of Poland), and hoped to become a professor of comparative literature, but never gained headway in the academic world. He worked most of his life as a librarian at the Jewish National and University Library. Oz's mother grew up in Rivne (then part of Poland, now Ukraine). She was a highly sensitive and cultured daughter of a wealthy mill owner and his wife, and attended Charles University in Prague, where she studied history and philosophy. She had to abandon her studies when her father's business collapsed during the Great Depression.

Oz's parents were multilingual (his father claimed he could read in 16 or 17 languages, while his mother spoke four or five languages, but could read in seven or eight) but neither was comfortable speaking in Hebrew, which was adopted as the official language of Israel. They spoke with each other in Russian or Polish, but the only language they allowed Oz to learn was Hebrew.

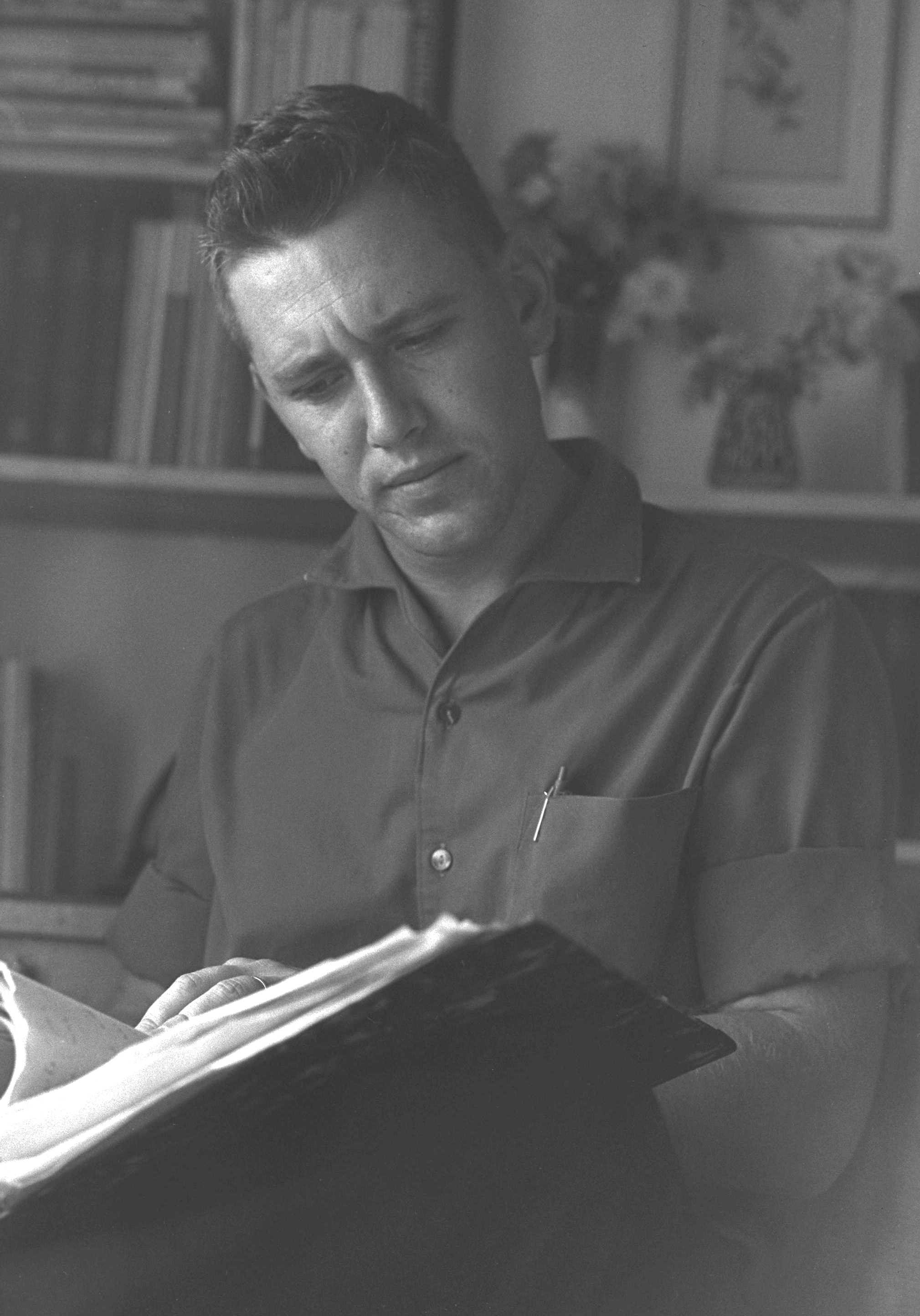
Oz in 1965

Many of Oz's family members were right-wing Revisionist Zionists. His great-uncle Joseph Klausner was the Herut party candidate for the presidency against Chaim Weizmann and was chair of the Hebrew literature department at the Hebrew University of Jerusalem. Klausner had a large personal library in his home and hosted salons for Israeli intellectuals; the lifestyle and scholarship of Klausner left an impression on Oz as a young boy.

Oz described himself as an "atheist of the book", stating from a secular perspective that his Jewish heritage "contains first and foremost books [and] texts". His parents were not religious growing up, though Oz attended the religious Tachkemoni school, since the only alternative was a socialist school affiliated with the Labor movement, to which his family was even more opposed. The noted poet Zelda Schneersohn Mishkovsky was one of his teachers. After Tachkemoni, he attended Gymnasia Rehavia.

During the Holocaust, some of his family members were killed in Lithuania. He has subsequently described the Holocaust as "the most significant event in my life."

His mother, who suffered from depression, committed suicide in January 1952, when he was 12. Oz would later explore the repercussions of this event in his memoir A Tale of Love and Darkness.

At the age of 14, Oz became a Labor Zionist, left home, and joined Kibbutz Hulda. There he was adopted by the Huldai family and changed his surname to "Oz" (Hebrew: "courage"). Later asked why he did not leave Jerusalem for Tel Aviv, he replied: "Tel Aviv was not radical enough – only the kibbutz was radical enough". By his own account, he was "a disaster as a laborer...the joke of the kibbutz". When Oz first began to write, the kibbutz allotted him one day per week for this work. When his novel My Michael became a best-seller, Oz quipped: "I became a branch of the farm, yet they still said I could have just three days a week to write. It was only in the eighties when I got four days for my writing, two days for teaching, and Saturday turns as a waiter in the dining hall."

Oz did his Israel Defense Forces service in the Nahal Brigade, participating in border skirmishes with Syria. After concluding his three years of mandatory regular army service, he was sent by his kibbutz to the Hebrew University of Jerusalem, where he studied philosophy and Hebrew literature. He graduated in 1963 and began teaching in the kibbutz high school, while continuing to write. He served as an army reservist in a tank unit that fought in the Sinai Peninsula during the Six-Day War, and in the Golan Heights during the Yom Kippur War.

Oz married Nily Zuckerman in 1960, and they had three children. The family continued to live at Hulda until 1986, when they moved to Arad in the Negev to seek relief for their son Daniel's asthma. Oz was a full professor of Hebrew literature at Ben-Gurion University of the Negev from 1987 to 2014. He also served as a writer in residence and visiting scholar at universities abroad. In 2014, the family moved to Tel Aviv. His oldest daughter, Fania Oz-Salzberger, teaches history at the University of Haifa.

Oz died of cancer on 28 December 2018 in Rabin Medical Center, Petah Tikva, aged 79. He was buried at Kibbutz Hulda.

In February 2021, Oz's daughter Galia accused her late father of subjecting her to "sadistic abuse". In her autobiography, Galia alleged that Amos Oz beat, swore at, and humiliated her in a routine of emotional, verbal, and physical abuse, writing that "The violence was creative: He dragged me from inside the house and threw me outside. He called me trash." Members of Galia's family have denied the allegations, claiming: "We have known all our lives a very different Amos, a warm and affectionate man who loved his family deeply and gently." In 2022, Oz's son Daniel published a memoir staunchly defending his father and criticizing his sister for supposedly distorting the truth.

== Literary career ==
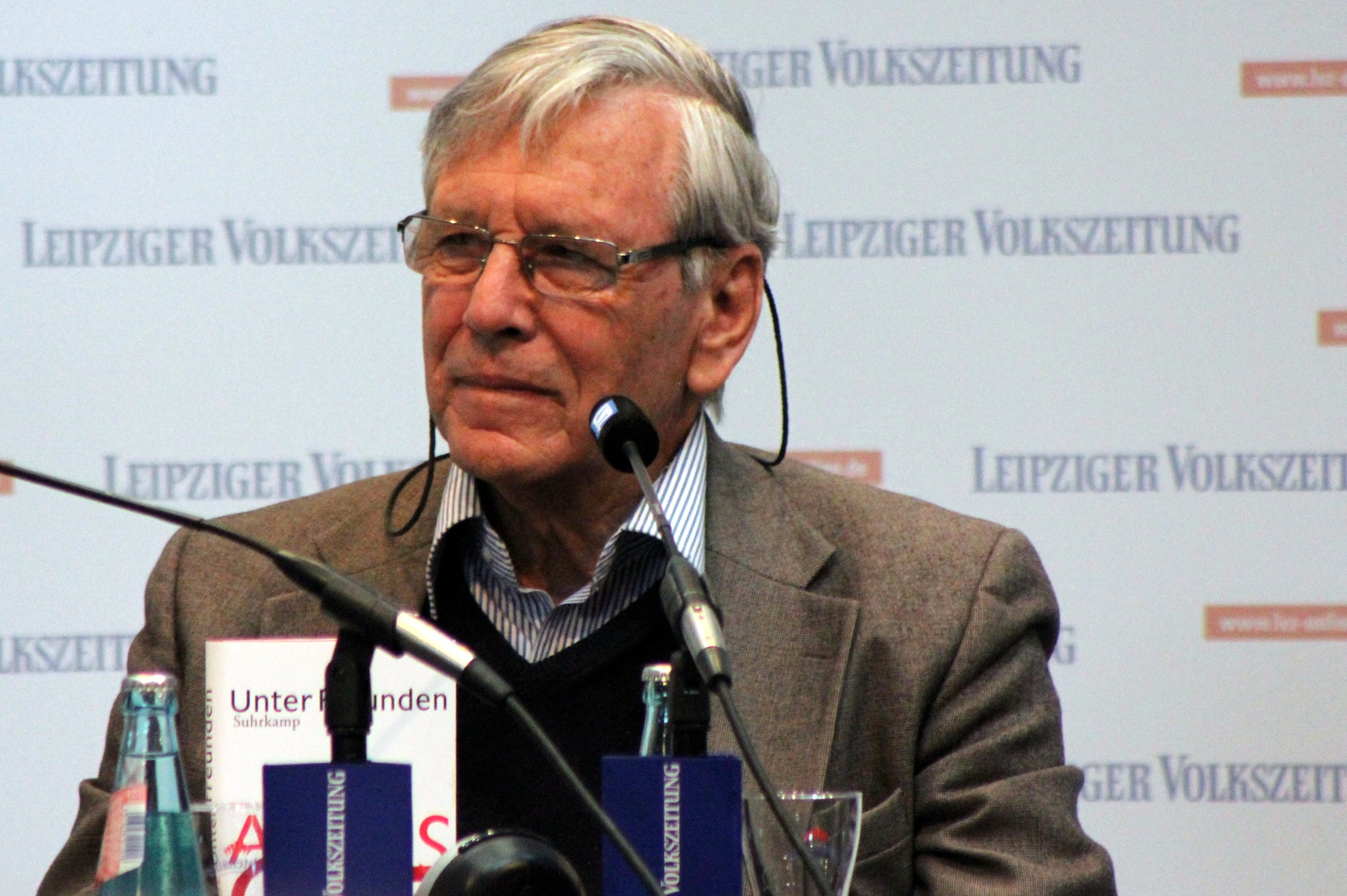
Oz in 2013

If I were to sum up my books in one word, I would say they are about 'families'. If you gave me two words, I would say 'unhappy families'.

— Amos Oz

Oz published his first book, Where the Jackals Howl, a collection of short stories, in 1965. His first novel, Another Place (published in U.S. as Elsewhere, Perhaps) appeared in 1966. Subsequently, Oz averaged a book per year with the Histadrut press Am Oved. In 1968, he published the critically acclaimed My Michael, establishing himself as one of the most prominent writers of his generation. Oz became a primary figure in the Israeli "New Wave" movement in literature in the 1960s, a group which included A. B. Yehoshua, Amalia Kahana-Carmon, and Aharon Appelfeld.

His long-time publisher was the Histadrut press Am Oved. However, in 1988, Oz left Am Oved for the Keter Publishing House, which offered him an exclusive contract that granted him a fixed monthly salary regardless of output.

Oz published 40 books, among them 14 novels, five collections of stories and novellas, two children's books, and twelve books of articles and essays (as well as eight selections of essays that appeared in various languages), and about 450 articles and essays. His works have been translated into some 45 languages, more than any other Israeli writer. In 2007, a selection from the Chinese translation of A Tale of Love and Darkness was the first work of modern Hebrew literature to appear in an official Chinese textbook. The story "Esperanto" from the collection Between Friends was translated into Esperanto in 2015.

Oz's political commentary and literary criticism have been published in the Histadrut newspaper Davar and Yedioth Ahronoth. Translations of his essays have appeared in The New York Review of Books. The Ben-Gurion University of the Negev maintains an archive of his work.

Oz tended to present protagonists in a realistic light with an ironic touch while his treatment of the life in the kibbutz was accompanied by a somewhat critical tone. Oz credited a 1959 translation of American writer Sherwood Anderson's short story collection Winesburg, Ohio with his decision to "write about what was around me". In A Tale of Love and Darkness, his memoir of coming of age in the midst of Israel's violent birth pangs, Oz credited Anderson's "modest book" with his own realization that "the written world ... always revolves around the hand that is writing, wherever it happens to be writing: where you are is the center of the universe." In his 2004 essay "How to Cure a Fanatic" (later the title essay of a 2006 collection), Oz argued that the Israeli-Palestinian conflict is not a war of religion or cultures or traditions, but rather a real estate dispute – one that will be resolved not by greater understanding, but by painful compromise.

== Views and opinions ==
Oz speaking at Tel Aviv University, faculty of medicine in 2011

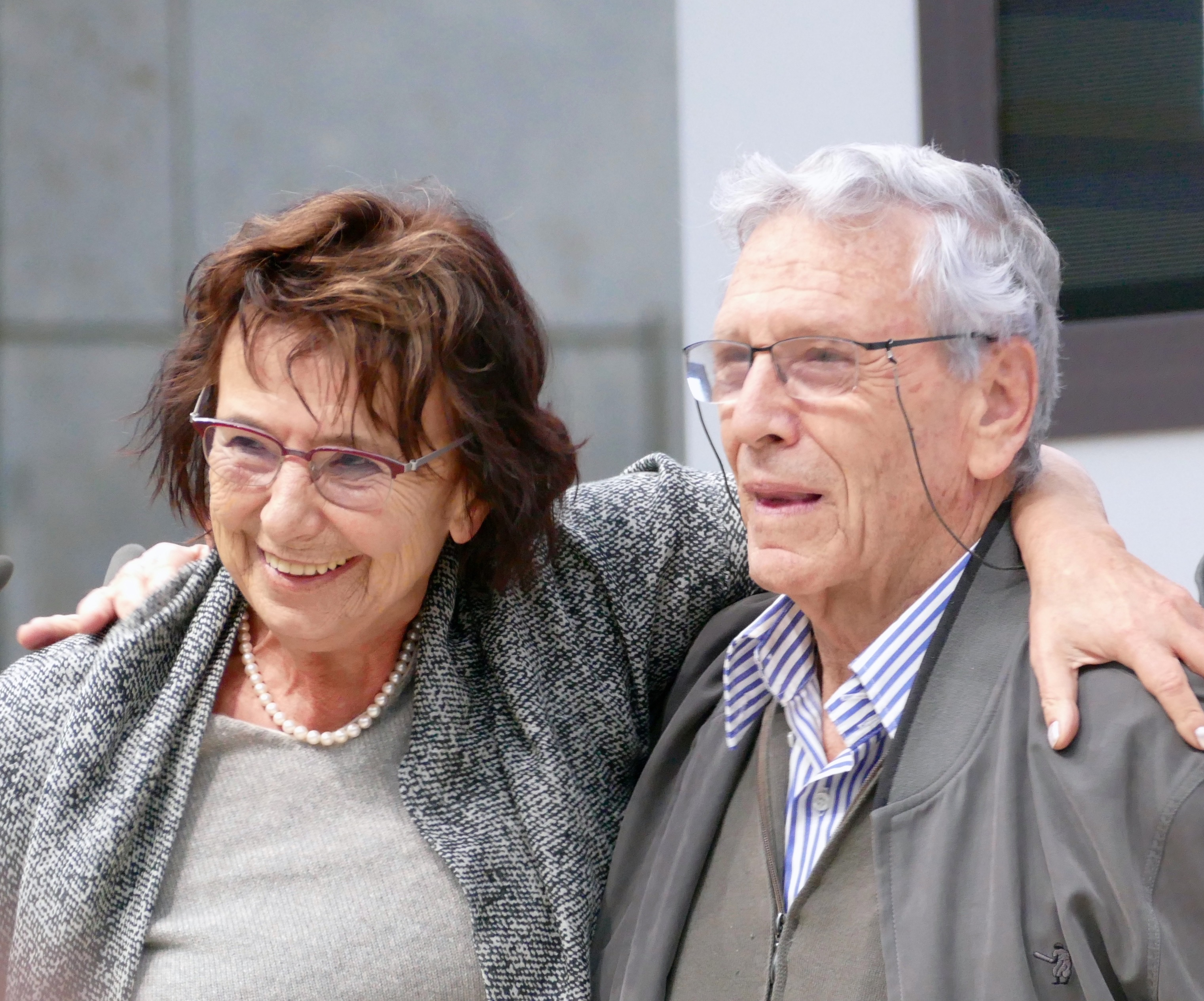
Oz in 2015, with Mirjam Pressler, who received a prize for a translation of his novel to German

Oz was one of the first Israelis to advocate a two-state solution to the Israeli–Palestinian conflict after the Six-Day War. He did so in a 1967 article "Land of our Forefathers" in the Labor newspaper Davar. "Even unavoidable occupation is a corrupting occupation," he wrote. In 1978, he was one of the founders of Peace Now. He did not oppose (and in 1991 advocated) the construction of an Israeli West Bank barrier, but believed that it should be roughly along the Green Line, the 1949 Armistice line between Israel and Jordan. He also advocated that Jerusalem be divided into numerous zones, not just Jewish and Palestinian zones, including one for the Eastern Orthodox, one for Hasidic Jews, an international zone, and so on.

He was opposed to Israeli settlement activity and was among the first to praise the Oslo Accords and talks with the PLO. In his speeches and essays he frequently attacked the non-Zionist left and always emphasized his Zionist identity. He was perceived as an eloquent spokesperson of the Zionist left. When Shimon Peres retired from the leadership of the Israeli Labor Party, he is said to have named Oz as one of three possible successors, along with Ehud Barak (later Prime Minister) and Shlomo Ben-Ami (later Barak's foreign minister). In the 1990s, Oz withdrew his support from Labor and went further left to the Meretz Party, where he had close connections with the leader, Shulamit Aloni. In the elections to the sixteenth Knesset that took place in 2003, Oz appeared in the Meretz television campaign, calling upon the public to vote for Meretz.

Oz was a supporter of the Second Lebanon War in 2006. In the Los Angeles Times, he wrote: "Many times in the past, the Israeli peace movement has criticized Israeli military operations. Not this time. This time, the battle is not over Israeli expansion and colonization. There is no Lebanese territory occupied by Israel. There are no territorial claims from either side... The Israeli peace movement should support Israel's attempt at self-defense, pure and simple, as long as this operation targets mostly Hezbollah and spares, as much as possible, the lives of Lebanese civilians." Later, Oz changed his position of unequivocal support of the war as "self-defense" in the wake of the cabinet's decision to expand operations in Lebanon.

A day before the outbreak of the 2008–2009 Israel–Gaza conflict, Oz signed a statement supporting military action against Hamas in the Gaza Strip. Two weeks later, he advocated a ceasefire with Hamas and called attention to the harsh conditions there. He was quoted in the Italian paper Corriere della Sera as saying Hamas was responsible for the outbreak of violence, but the time had come to seek a ceasefire. Oz also said that if innocent citizens were indeed killed in Gaza, it should be treated as a war crime, although he doubted that bombing UN structures was intentional.

In a June 2010 editorial in The New York Times, he wrote: "Hamas is not just a terrorist organization. Hamas is an idea, a desperate and fanatical idea that grew out of the desolation and frustration of many Palestinians. No idea has ever been defeated by force... To defeat an idea, you have to offer a better idea, a more attractive and acceptable one... Israel has to sign a peace agreement with President Mahmoud Abbas and his Fatah government in the West Bank."

In March 2011, Oz sent imprisoned former Tanzim leader Marwan Barghouti a copy of his book A Tale of Love and Darkness in Arabic translation with his personal dedication in Hebrew: "This story is our story, I hope you read it and understand us as we understand you, hoping to see you outside and in peace, yours, Amos Oz." The gesture was criticized by members of rightist political parties, among them Likud MK Tzipi Hotovely. Assaf Harofeh Hospital canceled Oz's invitation to give the keynote speech at an awards ceremony for outstanding physicians in the wake of this incident.

Oz supported Israeli actions in Gaza during the 2014 Israel–Gaza conflict, criticizing the tactic of using human shields, widely imputed to be employed by Hamas at the time, asking: "What would you do if your neighbor across the street sits down on the balcony, puts his little boy on his lap, and starts shooting machine-gun fire into your nursery? What would you do if your neighbor across the street digs a tunnel from his nursery to your nursery in order to blow up your home or in order to kidnap your family?"

== Awards and recognition ==
- 1965 – Kugel Prize literary award from Municipality of Holon
- 1976 – Brenner Prize
- 1983 – Bernstein Prize (original Hebrew novel category) for A Perfect Peace
- 1984 – made an Officier of the Ordre des Arts et des Lettres in France.
- 1986 – Bialik Prize for literature (jointly with Yitzhak Orpaz)
- 1988 – French Prix Femina étranger
- 1992 – Friedenspreis des Deutschen Buchhandels
- 1997 – named to the French Legion of Honour
- 1998 – Israel Prize for literature
- 2004 – Welt-Literaturpreis from the German newspaper Die Welt
- 2004 – Ovid Prize from the city of Neptun, Romania
- 2005 – Goethe Prize from the city of Frankfurt, Germany for his life's work
- 2006 – Jerusalem-Agnon Prize
- 2006 – Corine Literature Prize (Germany)
- 2007 – Prince of Asturias Award in Literature (Spain)
- 2007 – A Tale of Love and Darkness named one of the ten most important books since the creation of the State of Israel
- 2008 – German President's High Honor Award
- 2008 – Primo Levi Prize (Italy)
- 2008 – Heinrich Heine Prize of Düsseldorf, Germany
- 2008 – Tel Aviv University's Dan David Prize ("Past Category") (jointly with Atom Egoyan and Tom Stoppard), for "Creative Rendering of the Past"
- 2008 – Foreign Policy/Prospect list of 100 top public intellectuals (#72)
- 2013 – Franz Kafka Prize
- 2014 – Order of Civil Merit
- 2014 – Siegfried Lenz Prize, granted by the City of Hamburg
- 2015 – World premiere of the film A Tale of Love and Darkness, based on Amos Oz's autobiographical novel, takes place at the Cannes international film festival. The film is directed and co-written by Natalie Portman, who also stars as Oz's mother, with Amir Tessler playing Oz.
- 2015 – Internationaler Literaturpreis – Haus der Kulturen der Welt, Germany, winner for Judas
- 2015 – Honorary degree by the University of Milan (in Language and cultures for communication and international cooperation)
- 2015 – Park Kyong-ni Prize, a South Korean award valued at $100,000
- 2018 – Stig Dagerman Prize, Sweden (for "Judas")

== Published works ==
Oz published novels, novellas, and collections of short stories in Hebrew. He wrote essays and journalism for Israeli and foreign papers. Among his works:

=== Non-fiction ===
- In the Land of Israel (essays on political issues), ISBN 0-15-144644-X
- Israel, Palestine and Peace: Essays (1995). Previously published as Whose Holy Land? (1994).
- Under This Blazing Light (1995), ISBN 0-521-44367-9
- Israeli Literature: a Case of Reality Reflecting Fiction (1985), ISBN 0-935052-12-7
- The Slopes of Lebanon (1989), ISBN 0-15-183090-8
- The Story Begins: Essays on Literature (1999), ISBN 0-15-100297-5
- A Tale of Love and Darkness (2002), ISBN 0-15-100878-7
- How to Cure a Fanatic (2006), ISBN 978-0-691-12669-2
- Jews and Words (20 November 2012), with Oz-Salzberger, Fania. New Haven: Yale University Press. ISBN 978-0-300-15647-8
- Dear Zealots: Letters from a Divided Land (2017), Houghton Mifflin Harcourt, ISBN 978-1-328-98700-6
- What's in an Apple (Conversations with Shira Hadad), 2018

=== Fiction ===
- Where the Jackals Howl (1965), ISBN 0-15-196038-0
- Elsewhere, Perhaps (1966), ISBN 0-15-183746-5
- My Michael (1968), ISBN 0-394-47146-6
- Unto Death (1971), ISBN 0-15-193095-3
- Touch the Water, Touch the Wind (1973), ISBN 0-15-190873-7
- The Hill of Evil Counsel (1976), ISBN 0-7011-2248-X ; ISBN 0-15-140234-5
- Soumchi (1978), ISBN 0-06-024621-9; ISBN 0-15-600193-4
- A Perfect Peace (1982), ISBN 0-15-171696-X
- Black Box (1987), ISBN 0-15-112888-X
- To Know a Woman (1989), ISBN 0-7011-3572-7; ISBN 0-15-190499-5
- Fima (1991), ISBN 0-15-189851-0
- Don't Call It Night (1994), ISBN 0-15-100152-9
- Panther in the Basement (1995), ISBN 0-15-100287-8
- The Same Sea (1999), ISBN 0-15-100572-9
- The Silence of Heaven: Agnon's Fear of God (2000), ISBN 0-691-03692-6
- Suddenly in the Depth of the Forest (A Fable for all ages) (2005), English translation by Sondra Silverston (2010), ISBN 978-0-7011-8227-4
- Rhyming Life and Death (2007), ISBN 978-0-7011-8228-1
- Scenes from Village Life (2009), ISBN 978-0-09-954136-3
- Between Friends (2012), ISBN 978-0-7011-8796-5
- Judas (2014), ISBN 978-1-78474-050-4

=== Short stories ===
- "Heirs". The New Yorker. 22 January 2007.
- "Waiting". The New Yorker. Vol. 84, no. 40. 8 December 2008. pp. 82–89.
- "The King of Norway". The New Yorker. 17 January 2011. Archived from the original on 28 February 2011.

=== Articles ===
- "Arafat's gift to us: Sharon", The Guardian, 8 February 2001
- "An end to Israeli occupation will mean a just war", The Observer, 7 April 2002
- "Free at last", Ynetnews, 21 August 2005
- "This can be a vote for peace", The Guardian, 30 March 2006
- "Defeating the extremists", Ynetnews, 21 November 2007
- "Don't march into Gaza", Ynetnews, 13 February 2008
- "Secure ceasefire now", Ynetnews, 31 December 2008

== See also ==
- Amos Oz: The Nature of Dreams
- List of Israel Prize recipients
- List of Bialik Prize recipients
