= Alan H. Friedman =

American novelist (1928–2019)

Alan Howard Friedman (January 4, 1928 – March 24, 2019) was an American novelist, short story writer, and literary critic. He taught English and creative writing as a professor at Columbia University, Swarthmore College, and the University of Illinois, Chicago, where he served as Director of the Creative Writing Program in the Department of English. He reviewed fiction for The New York Times Book Review from 1978 to 1998. He was nominated for the National Book Award in 1973 for his novel Hermaphrodeity. His short story "Willy Nilly", published in the January, 1968 edition of New American Review, served as the basis for the 1987 film Something Special, directed by Paul Schneider.

Friedman was born on January 4, 1928, in Brooklyn, New York. His grandparents were Russian and Ukrainian immigrants. He received his B.A. in English Literature from Harvard University in 1949, his M.A. in English Literature from Columbia University in 1950, and his Ph.D. in English Literature from the University of California, Berkeley in 1964. He died on March 24, 2019, at his home in Escondido, California.
