= Keter Publishing House =

Israeli publishing house

- Founded: 1959
- Headquarters location: Jerusalem, Israel
- Distribution: Israel
- Official website: Keter Publishing

Keter Publishing House (Hebrew: כֶּתֶר הוֹצָאָה , romanized: Keter Hōzaʾah) is one of the largest publishing companies in Israel, which also owns printing plants. Since 2005, its publishing activities have been carried out through its subsidiary, Keter Books. It is a member of the Israel Publishers Association.

== History ==
Keter Publishing was founded in Jerusalem in 1959 as the "Israeli Science Translation Factory Ltd.", on the initiative of Teddy Kollek, who sought to find work for academic immigrants from Eastern Europe. The Science Translation Factory employed hundreds of translators who translated scientific publications for various countries, such as the United States, England, and the Scandinavian countries, mainly from Russian to English. In March 1961, the Science Translation Factory was converted into a government company called "Keter Publishing Factory Ltd." and operated from offices in the Givat Shaul industrial zone (Giv'at Shaul B). In 1964, the company began translating books for free distribution, not by invitation, and starting in 1965, it published original science books by Israeli authors. In 1966, it took over the publishing of the Encyclopedia Judaica. The 16 volume encyclopedia took five years to complete with Keter spending $5 million noting it would likely not recoup its investment financially. The following year, the publication began translating science books into Hebrew.

In the mid-1970s, the publishing house suffered heavy losses. As a result, ownership of the publication was transferred from Clal Industries to the parent company "Clal", in order to free Clal Industries from the publishing house's obligations. In 1975, it was decided to turn "Keter" into a publishing house of Hebrew literature and not just deal with scientific translations and encyclopedias. The first Hebrew book it published was "The Tales of Ferdinand Padhatsor in Brief" (Hebrew: עלילות פרדיננד פדהצור בקיצור), a children's book written by Ephraim Sidon and illustrated by Yossi Abolafia. By early 1978, it had published twenty Hebrew books, then about 30 books a year. By the mid-1980s, it was the largest book publisher in Israel, publishing about 120 original books a year, including: fine literature, non-fiction, educational, children's and youth, albums and encyclopedias, including Britannica for Youth in addition to Judaica. It was the first book publisher in Israel to invest extensively in computerization, sales promotion, and public relations, and it also owned a modern printing press.

In 1984, Keter acquired the publishing house of Shikmona, which continued to publish books under the name "Shikmona", including travel guides including the popular Lapid Guide by Yosef Lapid, who was the first Hebrew travel guide for those traveling abroad and albums on the subject of the Land of Israel. Following a loss of $920,000 by "Keter Publishing" in 1989, 51% of its shares (maintaining 24%) were sold by Clal to Macmillan Inc., a subsidiary of Robert Maxwell's company, in 1990. At this time "Keter" owned about 34 bookstores in Israel. In 1992, Asher Reshef, through his company Arledan Investments, purchased the shares of Macmillan.

In 2002, Keter reached an agreement with "Sifriat Maariv" that Keter would manage all of its publishing activities. In 2005, a subsidiary company, Keter Books, was established, 52% of whose shares are owned by Keter Publishing. Laor and 48% owned by Steimatzky, to whom the company's publishing activities were transferred. Keter Publishing continued to directly manage its printing activities. In 2008, Steimatzky sold most of its shares in Keter Books to Keter Publishing. In March 2016, Keter sold Keter Books to Modan Publishing, but retained the printing and distribution activities. At the end of that year, its shares were also delisted from trading on the Tel Aviv Stock Exchange, following a series of takeover bids by the Reshef family, who did not control the company.

== Activity ==
Over the years, Keter has published books of almost all kinds, and also operates a large printing house that provides printing services to other publishing houses.

=== Authors ===
In order to attract leading Israeli writers to publish at Keter, it offered generous financial terms, including to Amos Oz, Ilana Gur and Benjamin Tammuz. It financed Yitzhak Ben Ner's one-year stay in the United States and Ephraim Sidon's one-year stay in London, in exchange for writing books. In order to In order not to damage the prestigious image of the publishing house, and at the same time not to lose profits from the sale of translated popular literature of the romantic novel and pulp fiction, a separate subsidiary publishing house called "Shahaf" was established to publish these books.

Other notable authors include David Grossman, Batya Gur, Amnon Jacont, Alona Kimchi, Shulamit Lapid, Israel Segal, A.B. Yehoshua.

=== Chain of bookstores ===
In the 1980s, "Keter Publishing" began operating a chain of bookstores. The first store opened in the Clal Center in Jerusalem in the summer of 1980. The chain grew gradually and by 1988 already had 20 stores. In November 1988, the chain opened its flagship store on Dizengoff Street, in the Passage Hod building, on the premises where the "Matzkin" department store had previously operated. The store was spread over three floors, built with an investment of one million dollars, and designed by Ada Karmi-Melamed, included a café and was called "the largest bookstore in the Middle East". In early 1989, it also began operating 11 bookstores within the Mashbhir consumer chain, in addition to the stores it operated inside theaters, so that in total that year it operated 33 stores.

In late 1990, after the chain suffered losses, negotiations began to sell the chain's stores to Steimatzky, which at the same time was negotiating a partnership with "Ashtarg", a company that operated discount book fairs. In March 1991, the chain also began to import books and magazines in foreign languages. Finally, in June 1991, the chain was sold to a group of investors in the Eli Granit chain, who had previously managed the "Diyonun" chain. The chain began operating under the name "Granit-Keter" but still suffered losses and closed its The flagship store on Dizengoff Street. The entire chain closed a few years later.
