= Nicholas de Lange =

British Reform rabbi and historian

- Born: 7 August 1944 (age 82); Nottingham, England

Academic background
- Education: Christ Church, Oxford
- Website: https://www.divinity.cam.ac.uk/directory/de-lange

Nicholas Robert Michael de Lange (born 7 August 1944) is a British Reform rabbi and historian. He is Professor of Hebrew and Jewish Studies at the University of Cambridge.

== Academic and literary career ==
Nicholas de Lange is an emeritus fellow at Wolfson College, Cambridge. He has written and edited several books about Judaism and translated numerous works of fiction by Amos Oz, S. Yizhar and A. B. Yehoshua into English. In November 2007, he received the Risa Domb/Porjes Prize for Translation from the Hebrew for his translation of A Tale of Love and Darkness by Amos Oz.

He gives lectures on Modern Judaism and the Reading of Jewish texts at the Faculty of Divinity, University of Cambridge.

== Rabbinic career ==
De Lange is a Reform rabbi who studied with Ignaz Maybaum, a disciple of Franz Rosenzweig. He is the main rabbi of Etz Hayyim Synagogue in Chania.

== Published works ==
- Origen and the Jews: Studies in Jewish-Christian Relations in Third-Century Palestine (University of Cambridge Oriental Publications, 25) (1976), Cambridge University Press
- Apocrypha: Jewish Literature of the Hellenistic Age (Jewish Heritage Classics) (1978), New York: Viking Press
- Atlas of the Jewish World (1984), Oxford: Phaidon Press
- Judaism (1986), Oxford University Press
- "Jesus Christ and Auschwitz" (1997), New Blackfriars Vol. 78, No. 917/918, pp. 308–316
- An Introduction to Judaism (2000), Cambridge University Press, ISBN 978-0521460736, pp. 272
- The Penguin Dictionary of Judaism (Penguin Reference Library) (2008), ISBN 978-0141018478, pp. 400
