= Milenita =

- Also known as: Milenita
- Born: Milena Nikolova (In Cyrillic: Милена Николова); October 31, 1975 (age 51); Havana, Cuba
- Genres: Smooth jazz, Pop, Trip hop, Swing, Electro swing, Downtempo, R&B, Lounge, Jazz, Reggae fusion
- Occupations: Musician, actor
- Instruments: vocals, guitar, ukulele
- Years active: 2002–present
- Website: facebook.com/milenita.music

Milenita (Bulgarian: Миленита), born Milena Nikolova (in Cyrillic: Милена Николова), is a Bulgarian pop and jazz singer.

== Biography ==
Milenita was born in Havana, Cuba in 1975. When she was 4, her family moved to Madrid, Spain and then, when she was 8, to Mexico City. Milenita returned to Bulgaria at the age of 14 and spent several years studying. She graduated from the faculty of law of Sofia University at the age of 19 and moved to Palma de Majorca, Spain, to continue studies. Later she lived briefly in Chicago, IL, US before returning to Sofia, Bulgaria, where she settled.

Milenita has three children.

== Music career ==
Milenita gained popularity in Bulgaria with her 2003 single "Monogamni" (in Cyrillic: "Моногамни"), extensively played on the national radio stations. She toured with the band 'Piranes' (in Cyrillic: "Пирани") who also featured in the recording. Another single was released in 2003 called 'Tunela' (The Tunnel).

The same year the song 'La Sangue Oblige' was included in the book soundtrack of 'Electrochakra', a book by Bogdan Roussev.

In 2004 she composed 3 songs for the soundtrack of the famous Bulgarian film 'Mila from Mars', directed by Zornitsa Sophia. The movie earned success abroad, as being selected to participate in the Sarajevo Film Festival where the movie was awarded the Jury Prize and two prizes at the Mannheim-Heidelberg Filmfest.

In 2005 Milenita' released her debut album "Do it Again".

The following years the musician focused mainly on her family, seldom appearing in public, mainly for charity causes. In 2010 Milenita featured in "Dame Mas' (a.k.a. 'Bust Out'), a digital single of DJ KiNK, a prominent house and broken beat artist. The track was released on vinyl and digitally by the Argumento label, Macedonia in their 'The 3rd Argument EP' and later included in the compilation '2 Bears 1 Love', released by ITH (Defected in the House) label, UK.

In 2010 she released another album "Gato" in 2010, released on CD and for worldwide digital distribution through KVZ/Silvernoise. Soon after one of the album songs 'Cherni kotaraci' (in Cyrillic: "Черни котараци") was released as a single for digital distribution. Later that year was released what is to become the most successful music video of the musician, directed by Dimiter Kotsev-Shosho and starring the famous actor Julian Vergov (Mission London, Glass Home TV series).

Milenita returned to the film music in 2010 by composing score music for Lora from Morning Till Evening where she played the main role. Three of her songs were included in the movie soundtrack too.

After brief touring, Milenita again focused on her family and charity campaigns. In June 2012 the singer performed at the Elevation Music Festival. In 2013 Milenita continued touring, this time performing together with the funk-swing band 'Funky Miracle. She was head-liner of the "Na Tamno Freestyle" stage in the 2013 Spirit of Burgas music festival at Burgas Central Beach in August. In September she played an opening act for the Manu Chao concert in Sofia.

== Actor's Career ==
In 2011 Milenita debuted as an actress, playing the lead role in Dimiter Kotsev-Shosho's film Lora from Morning Till Evening (In Bulgarian: "Лора от сутрин до вечер"). After being shown in Bulgaria with relative success, the movie was presented at variety of international film festivals, such as the So Independent Film Fest: Bulgarian Film Fest that took place in New York, Tribeca Cinemas and San Francisco in 2012.

She also participated as a supporting act in the TV crime series "Undercover" (in Bulgarian: "Под прикритие"), as Adriana, beloved of 'The Hair' (in Cyrillic: Косъма), played by Alexander 'Srebroto' Sano. After the series gained popularity in Bulgaria, it was aired abroad, starting in Latin America through the AXN channels in 2013.

== Discography ==
=== Singles ===
- Monogamni (2003)
- Tunela (2003)
- Cherni kotaraci (Черни котараци) (2010, digital release)

=== Albums ===
- Do it Again (2005)
- Gato (2010)

== Reception ==
Milenita is well accepted by the critics in Bulgaria and increasingly popular with the younger audience.

In 2002 Milenita was nominated for best debut of the year by Bulgarian National Television as well as the musical MM Television.
