= Dieudonné Bolengetenge Balea =

Minister of Land Affairs of the Democratic Republic of the Congo
- In office December 8, 2014 – September 25, 2015
- President: Joseph Kabila
- Prime Minister: Augustin Matata Ponyo

Deputy of Isangi Territory, Tshopo
- In office 2006–2023

Secretary-general of Together for the Republic
- Incumbent
- Assumed office April 5, 2021
- Preceded by: Pierre Lumbi

Personal details
- Born: June 30, 1960 (age 65) Tolaw, Democratic Republic of the Congo
- Party: MSR, Together for the Republic

Dieudonné Bolengetenge Balea is a Congolese politician who represented Isangi Territory, Tshopo Province in the National Assembly from 2006 to 2023. He also served as Minister of Land Affairs from December 8, 2014, to September 25, 2015, and is currently serving as secretary-general of Together for the Republic.

== Biography ==
Bolengetenge was born in Tolaw, DRC, on June 30, 1960. He was first elected as a deputy in 2006, and he was re-elected in 2011 and 2018, under the Social Movement for Renewal. As minister of land affairs, Bolengetenge worked with integration traditional structures of land governance into government structures. In 2021, Moïse Katumbi nominated Bolengetenge as secretary general of Together for the Republic following the death of Pierre Lumbi. In 2023, he urged the Congolese population to vote in the 2023 election.
