= Dominique Munongo =

Democratic Republic of the Congo politician

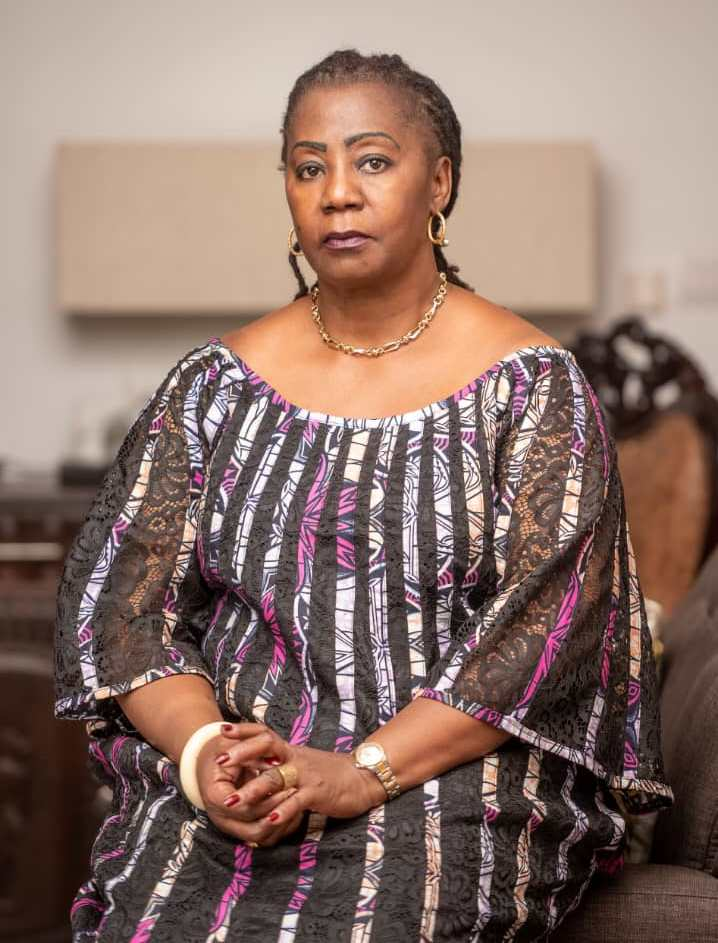
- Munongo in 2022

National Deputy
- Incumbent
- Assumed office 13 February 2019

Personal details
- Born: Princess Yeke Dominique Munongo Inamizi; 23 June 1961 (age 65) Lubumbashi
- Party: Together for the Republic
- Parent: Godefroid Munongo (father)
- Occupation: politician

Dominique Munongo Inamizi (born 23 June 1961) is a politician from the Democratic Republic of the Congo. She is a national deputy elected from Lubudi in the Lualaba province, a civil society activist, and a former mayor of the Likasi commune in Katanga.

== Biography ==
Dominique Munongo was born on 23 June 1961 in Lubumbashi. She comes from a royal family of Katanga: she is the daughter of King Mwenda Munongo and the great-granddaughter of M'Siri, the founder of the Yeke Kingdom.

She began her studies in Lusa, in the Katanga Province, at a convent school. When her father, Godefroid Munongo, was appointed Minister of the Interior, the family moved to Kinshasa and she continued her studies at the French school in Kinshasa and then in Belgium where she obtained her baccalaureate. She obtained a degree in sociology.

Dominique Munongo created, in 1993, the Centre for Women's Development Foundation which fights against poverty among women and children.

Dominique Munongo is appointed mayor of the commune of Likasi in Katanga.

She is a member of the political party National Union of Federalist Democrats (UNADEF) led by Charles Mwando Nsimba.

In 2018, Dominique Munongo was appointed to the cabinet of exiled politician Moïse Katumbi. She was in charge of external relations and international cooperation.

A member of the National Assembly, she is deputy rapporteur, a position traditionally reserved for a woman from the opposition, until the election of Clotilde Mutita Kalunga in November 2025.

=== Legal issues ===
On 5 April 2022, Munongo was prosecuted for inciting tribal hatred, after stating that her region is the most important one supplying Congo-Kinshasa with natural resources, a statement condemned by Minister Nicolas Kazadi. She also stated that people from Kasai eat dogs.
