= Autonomous Port of Conakry =

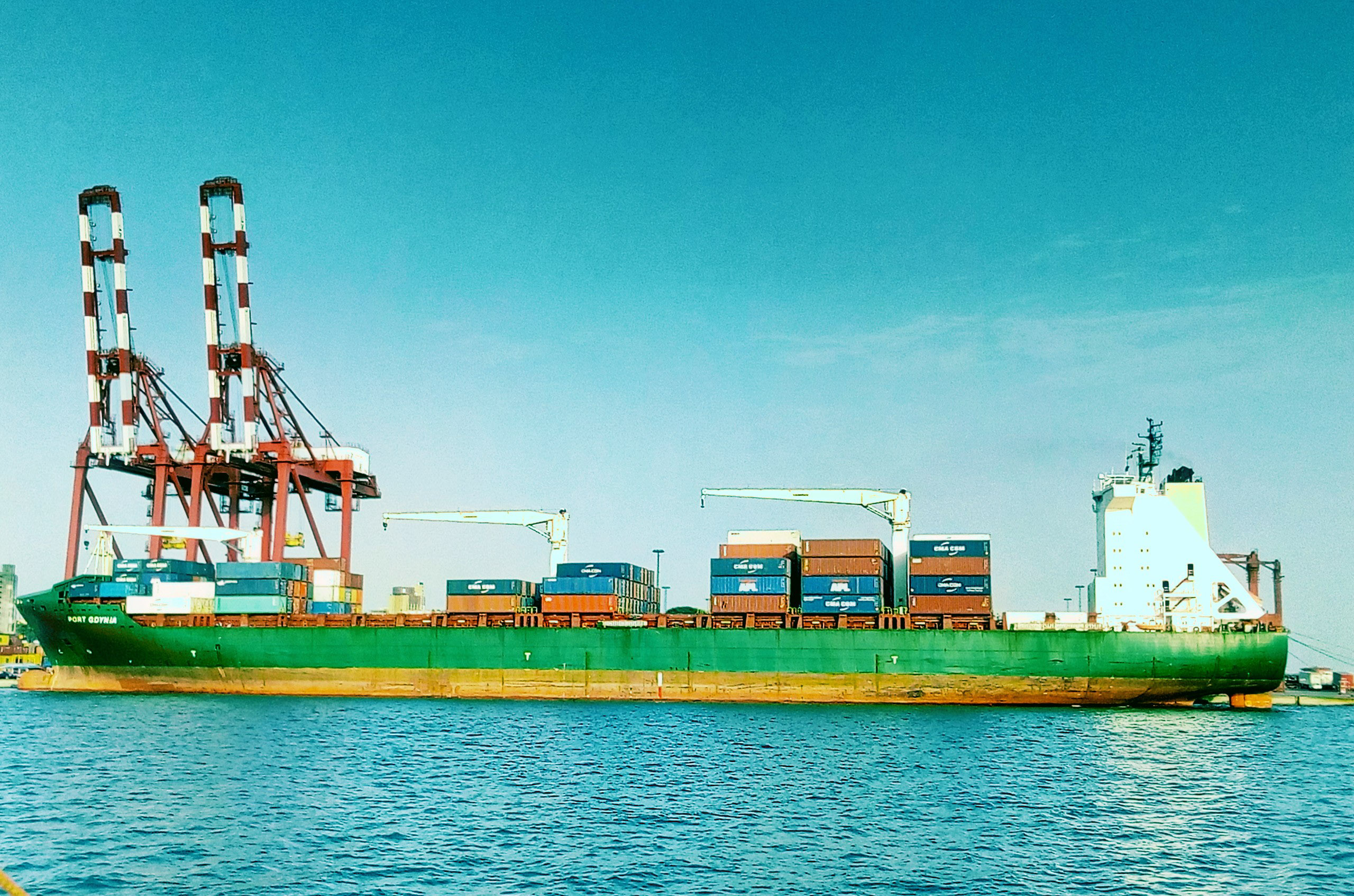
- The port of Conakry
- Click on the map for a fullscreen view

Location
- Location: Conakry, Guinea
- Coordinates: 9°31′8″N 13°42′55″W

Details
- Opened: 1866
- Owned by: Guinea
- Type of harbour: Natural/Artificial

The Autonomous Port of Conakry is a bauxite exporting and container port in the city of Conakry, Guinea. It was ranked first port of West Africa in 2021 by the World Bank and S&P Global Market Intelligence.

== Description ==
The capacity of Conakry Terminal is 8,000 TEU-channel. Its draft is 13 m but during the tide it is 10 m.

The port is run by private operators who are responsible for making the necessary investments for the development of port infrastructure and equipment. The port authority regulates monitors and controls activities on the port platform.

Port of Conakry is Guinea’s main commercial port, through which 90 percent of foreign trade is carried out. Its geographical location is strategic as the port forms the city’s main maritime border.

Only truck members of the Union Nationale Des Transporteurs Routiers De La Guinée (UNTRG) are allowed to operate in the Port.

== History ==
Relatively early on in the history of French Guinea, Conakry was an important port. Many factors made the site ideal for a port. It is a shallow area directly adjoining the coast, sheltered on all sides; to the southeast by the île de Tumbo, upon which the lies the city of Conakry; to the southwest by the îles de Loos; to the north by the underwater sandbar of la Prudente upon which a breakwater was built.

In 2008, the container port was granted to Getma, a subsidiary of the (now-defunct) French Cargo company Necotrans. This concession was cancelled in a 2011 legal decree.

following GETMA's eviction, in 2011, a public-private partnership agreement was signed between the French Cargo and logistics firm Bolloré and the Guinean state for the enlargement of the container terminal in exchange for assignment to the company of management of the container terminal for 25 years.

In March 2011, Necotrans raised a complaint against Vincent Bolloré, CEO of the eponymous company, accusing him of having financed the electoral campaign of Guinean president Alpha Condé in 2010. (Condé's campaign had hired Euro RSCG London, a subsidiary of Havas, which Mr. Bolloré owns.) The investigation opened by the parquet de Paris was closed without follow-up.

In October, 2013, Bolloré was sentenced by the commercial court of Nanterre to pay 2.1 million Euros to Getma.

It is therefore under the "investments actually made by the Getma company" and which "benefitted the new concessionaire" that the Nanterre Commercial Court is charging Bolloré.

== Gallery ==
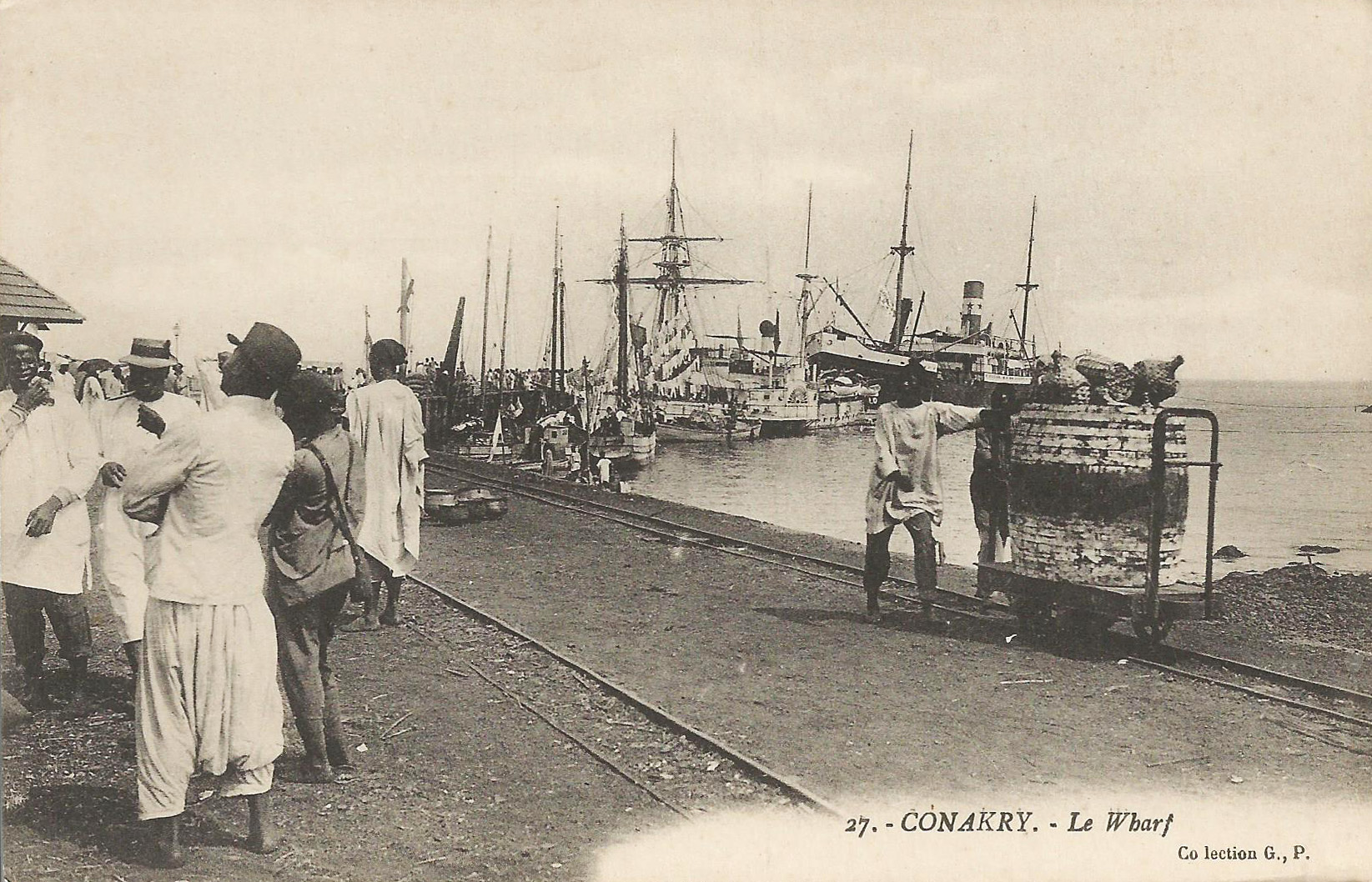

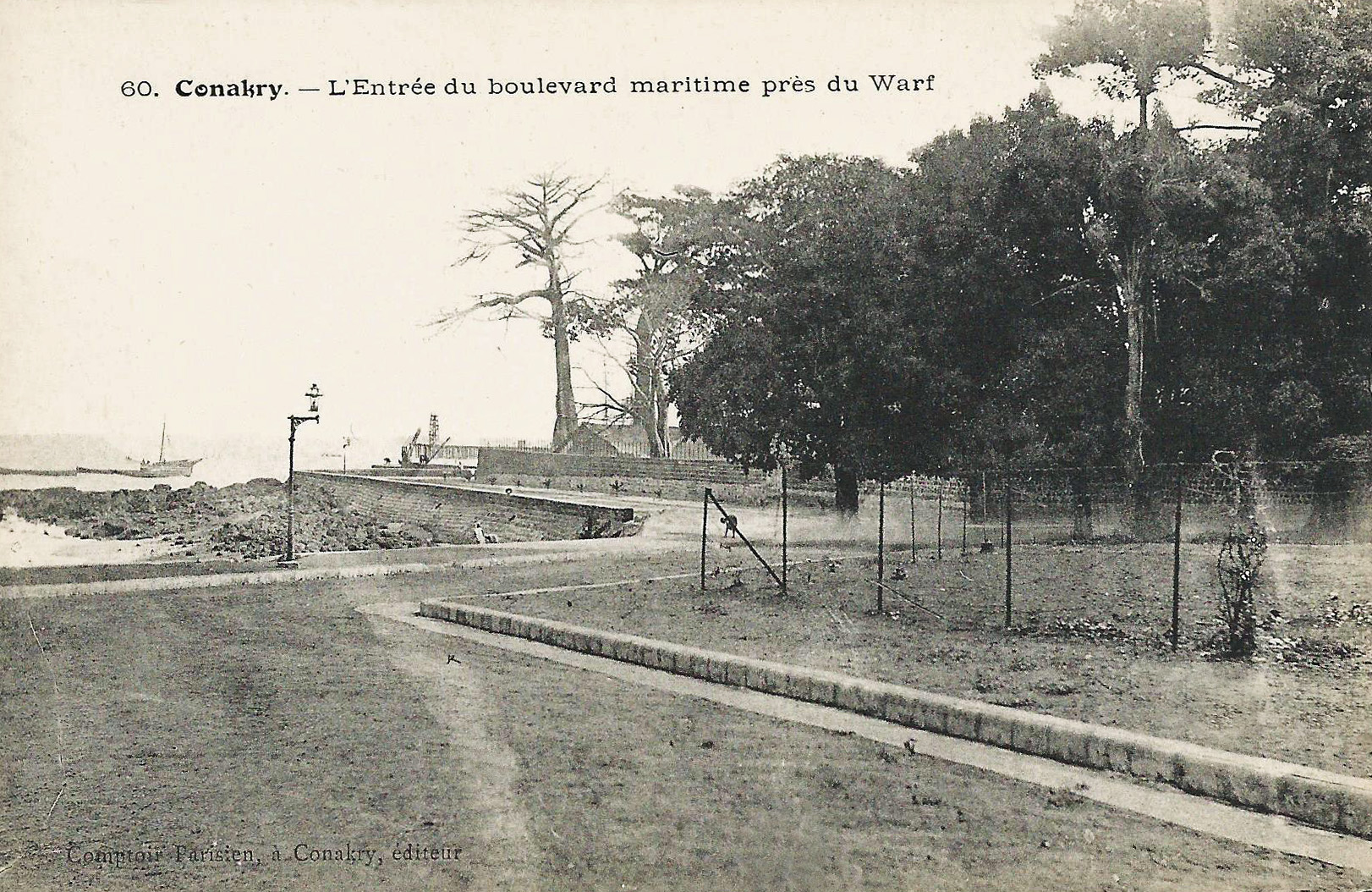

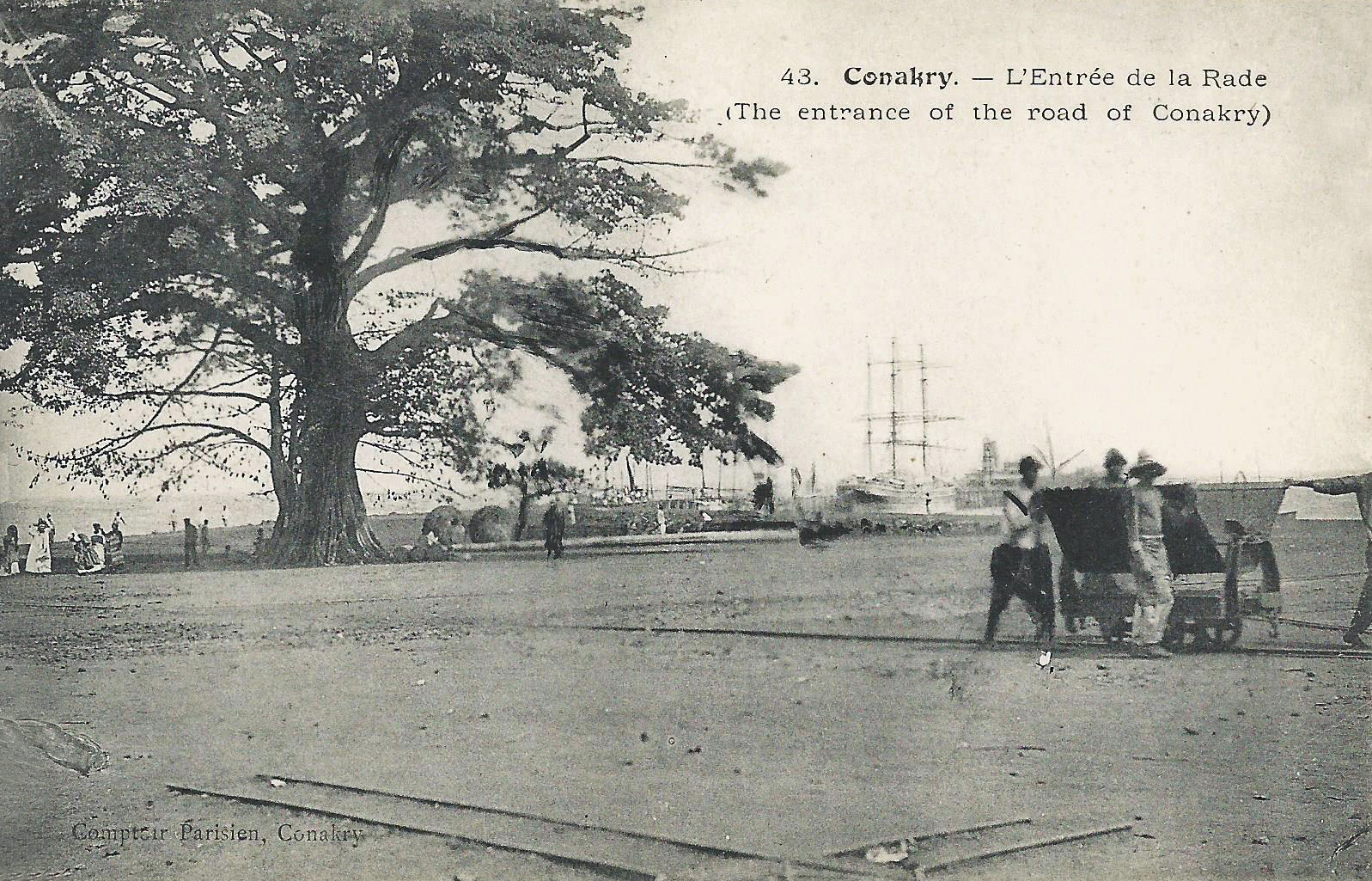

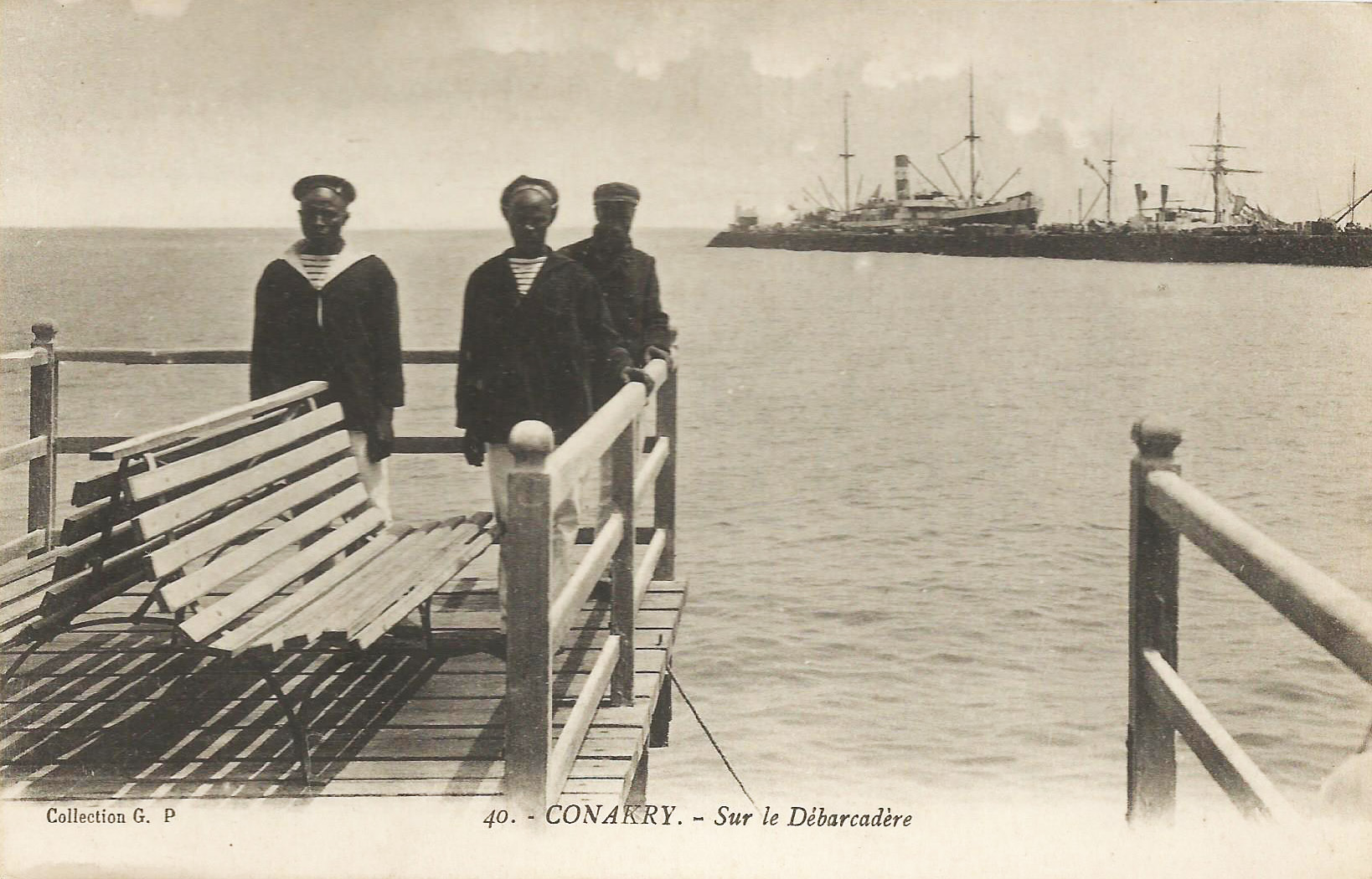

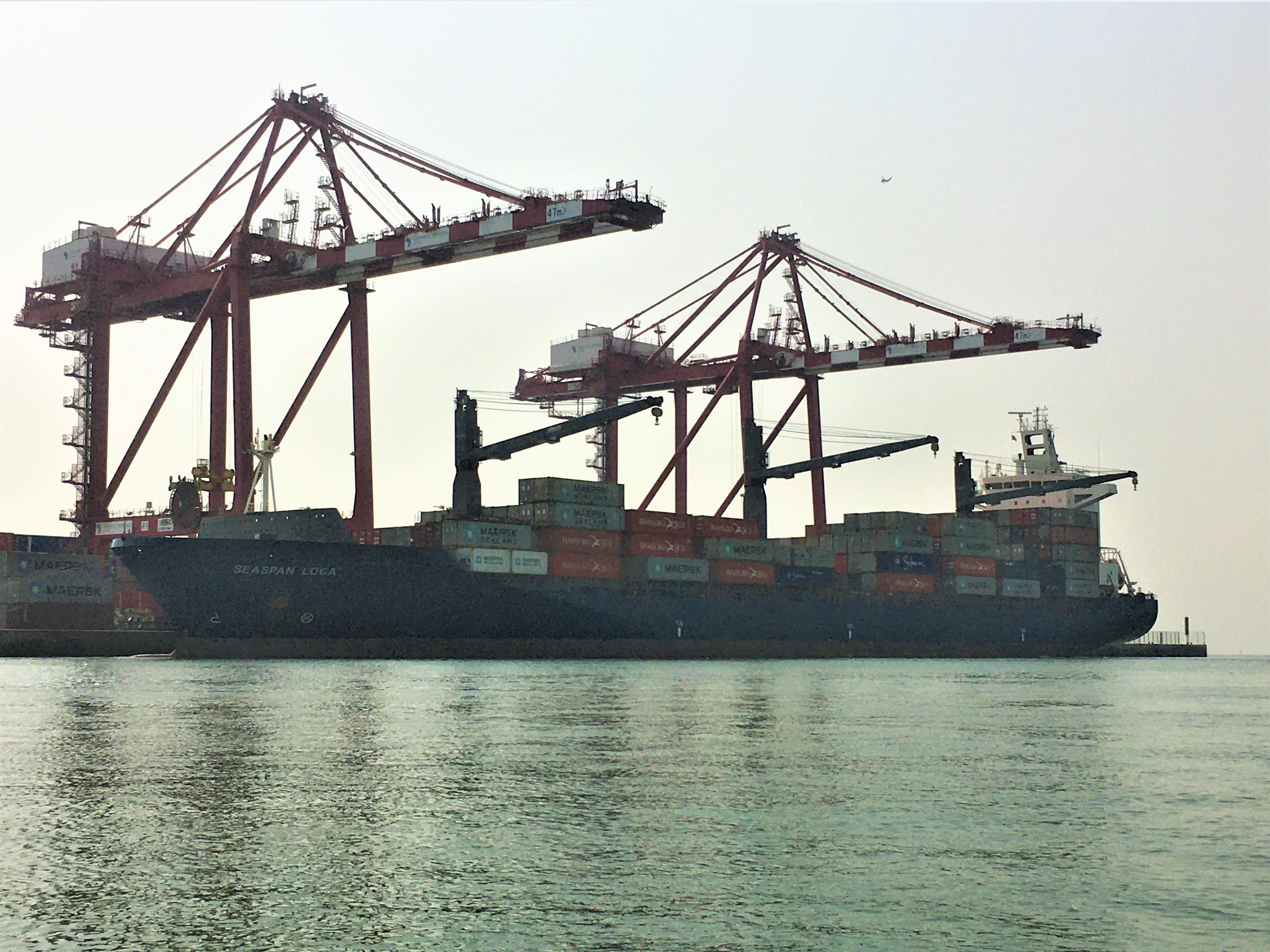

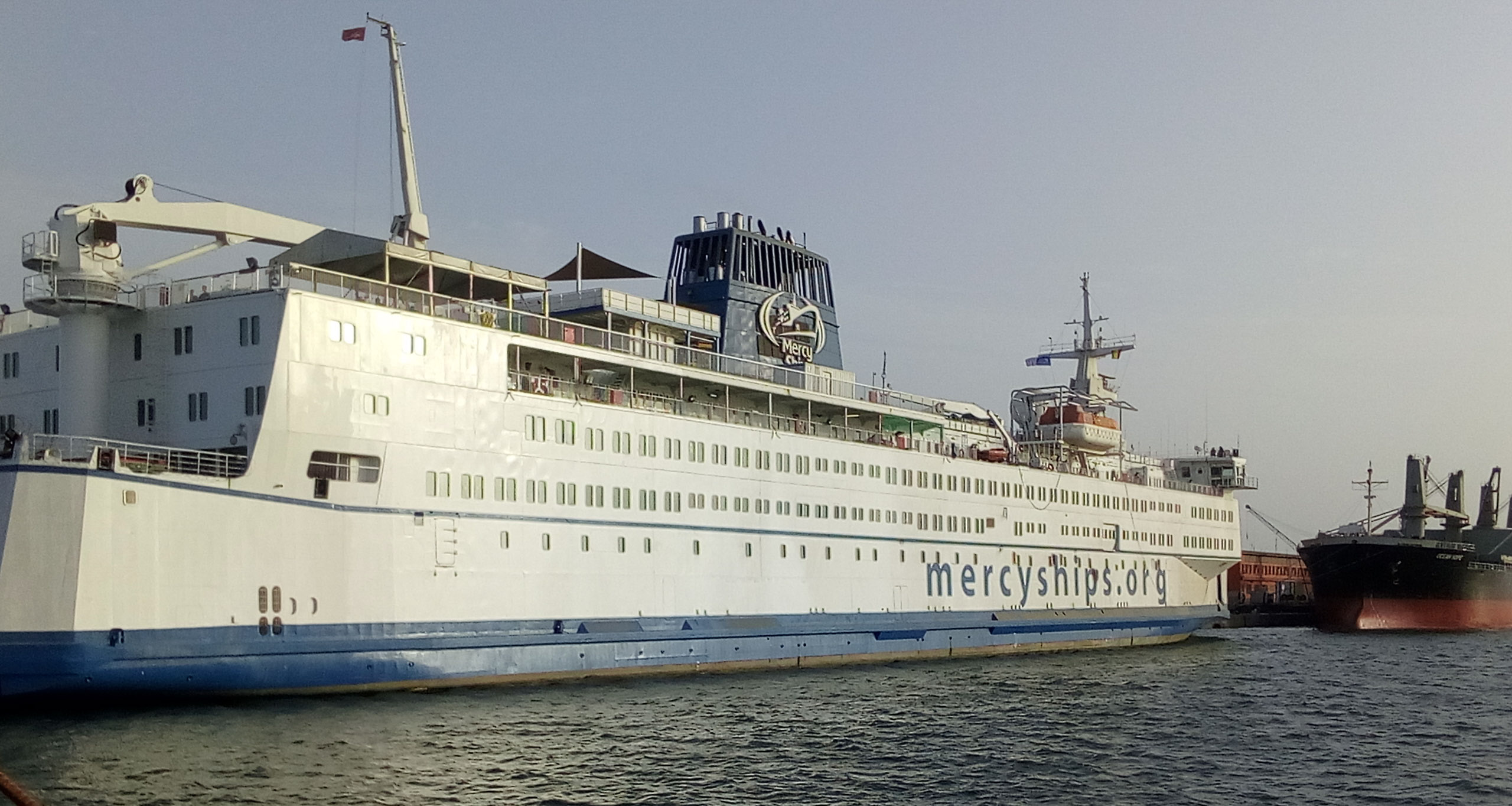

== See also ==
- Railway stations in Guinea
- Transguinean Railways
