= List of submissions to the 77th Academy Awards for Best Foreign Language Film =

2004 Best Foreign Language Film submissions
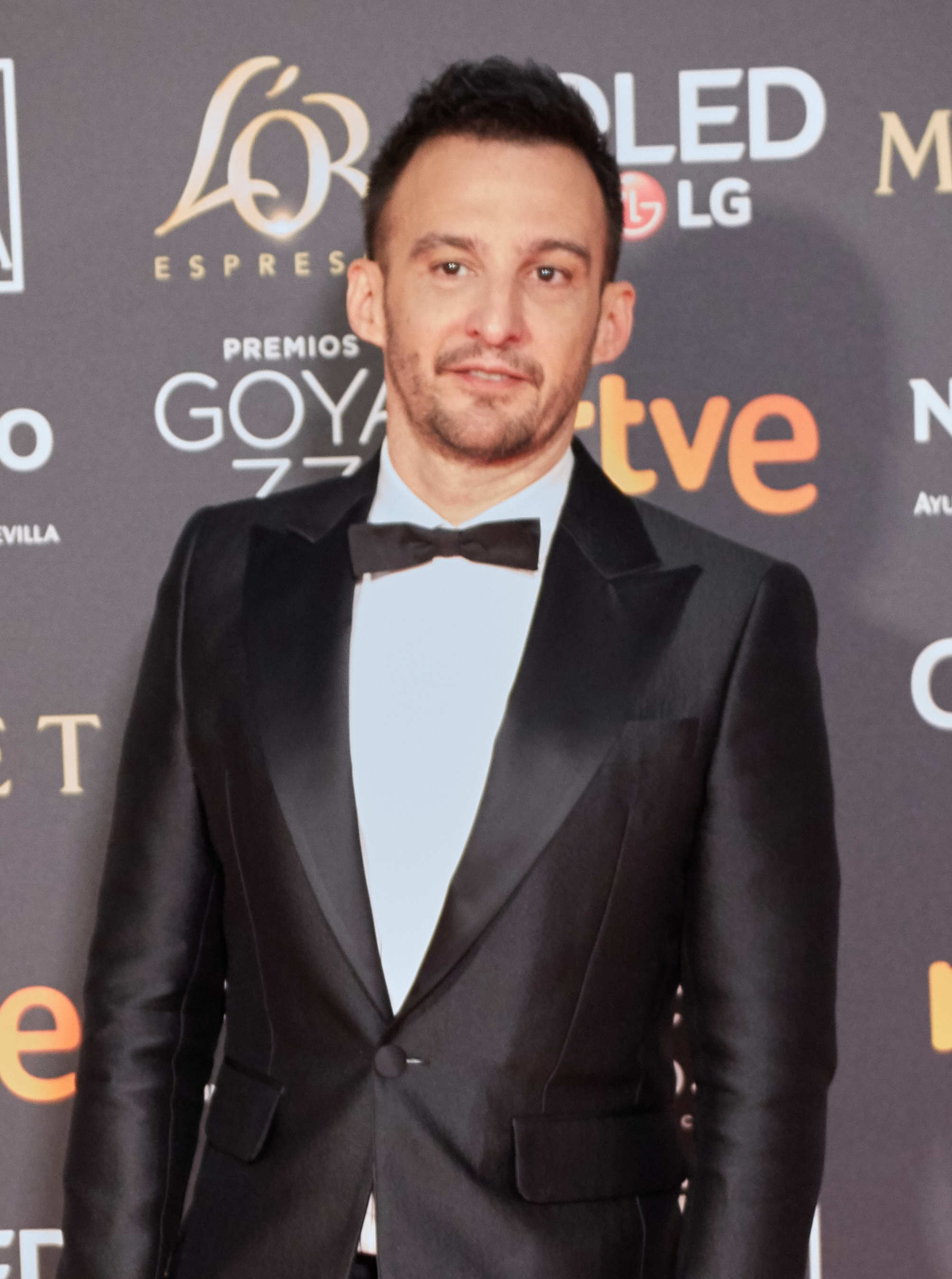
- Alejandro Amenabar directed The Sea Inside, which won the year's award.

Highlights
- Oscar winner: (Spain) The Sea Inside
- Submissions: 52
- Debuts: 1
- Total eligible: 50

This is a list of submissions to the 77th Academy Awards for the Best Foreign Language Film. The Academy of Motion Picture Arts and Sciences (AMPAS) has invited the film industries of various countries to submit their best film for the Academy Award for Best Foreign Language Film every year since the award was created in 1956. The award is presented annually by the Academy to a feature-length motion picture produced outside the United States that contains primarily non-English dialogue. The Foreign Language Film Award Committee oversees the process and reviews all the submitted films.

For the 77th Academy Awards, the submitted motion pictures must have first been released theatrically in their respective countries between 1 October 2003 and 30 September 2004. The deadline for submissions to the Academy was 1 October 2004. 52 countries submitted films, and 50 were found to be eligible by AMPAS and screened for voters. Malaysia submitted a film for the first time. The five nominees were announced on 25 January 2005.

Spain won the award for the fourth time with The Sea Inside by Alejandro Amenabar, which was also nominated for Best Makeup.

== Submissions ==
Submitting country	Film title used in nomination	Original title	Language(s)	Director(s)	Result
Afghanistan	Earth and Ashes	خاکستر و خاک	Dari, Pashto	Atiq Rahimi	Not nominated
Argentina	Lost Embrace	El abrazo partido	Spanish, Korean, Lithuanian, Yiddish	Daniel Burman	Not nominated
Austria	Antares		German, Croatian, English	Götz Spielmann	Not nominated
Belgium	The Alzheimer Case	De zaak Alzheimer	Dutch, French, Flemish	Erik Van Looy	Not nominated
Bosnia and Herzegovina	Days and Hours	Kod amidze Idriza	Bosnian	Pjer Žalica	Not nominated
Brazil	Olga		Brazilian Portuguese	Jayme Monjardim	Not nominated
Bulgaria	Mila from Mars	Мила от Марс	Bulgarian	Zornitsa Sophia	Not nominated
Canada	Far Side of the Moon	La face cachée de la lune	French, English, Russian	Robert Lepage	Not nominated
Chile	Machuca		Spanish	Andrés Wood	Not nominated
China	House of Flying Daggers	十面埋伏	Mandarin	Zhang Yimou	Not nominated
Colombia	El rey		Spanish	José Antonio Dorado	Not nominated
Croatia	Long Dark Night	Duga mračna noc	Croatian, German, Serbian	Antun Vrdoljak	Not nominated
Czech Republic	Up and Down	Horem pádem	Czech, English, Russian, German	Jan Hřebejk	Not nominated
Denmark	The Five Obstructions	De fem benspænd	Danish, English, French, Spanish	Jørgen Leth and Lars von Trier	Not nominated
Ecuador	Chronicles	Crónicas	Spanish, English	Sebastián Cordero	Not nominated
Egypt	I Love Cinema	بحب السيما	Arabic	Osama Fawzy	Not nominated
Estonia	Revolution of Pigs	Sigade revolutsioon	Estonian, Latvian	Jaak Kilmi and René Reinumägi	Not nominated
Finland	Producing Adults	Lapsia ja aikuisia – Kuinka niitä tehdään?	Finnish	Aleksi Salmenperä	Not nominated
France	The Chorus	Les choristes	French	Christophe Barratier	Nominated
Germany	Downfall	Der Untergang	German, Russian, French, Hungarian	Oliver Hirschbiegel	Nominated
Greece	A Touch of Spice	Πολίτικη Κουζίνα	Greek, Turkish, English	Tassos Boulmetis	Not nominated
Hong Kong	Running on Karma	大隻佬	Cantonese	Wai Ka-fai and Johnnie To	Disqualified
Hungary	Kontroll		Hungarian	Nimród Antal	Not nominated
Iceland	Cold Light	Kaldaljós	Icelandic, English	Hilmar Oddsson	Not nominated
India	Shwaas	श्वास	Marathi	Sandeep Sawant	Not nominated
Iran	Turtles Can Fly	کیسەڵەکانیش ەفڕن / لاک‌پشت‌ها هم پرواز می‌کنند	Central Kurdish, Arabic, English	Bahman Ghobadi	Not nominated
Israel	Campfire	מדורת השבט	Hebrew, English	Joseph Cedar	Not nominated
Italy	The Keys to the House	Le chiavi di casa	Italian, German, French, English	Gianni Amelio	Not nominated
Japan	Nobody Knows	誰も知らない	Japanese	Hirokazu Kore-eda	Not nominated
(North Macedonia) Macedonia	The Great Water	Γолемата вода	Macedonian, English	Ivo Trajkov	Not nominated
Malaysia	The Princess of Mount Ledang	Puteri Gunung Ledang	Malay, Indonesian	Saw Teong Hin	Not nominated
Mexico	Innocent Voices	Voces inocentes	Spanish	Luis Mandoki	Not nominated
Netherlands	Simon		Dutch, German, English	Eddy Terstall	Not nominated
Norway	Hawaii, Oslo		Norwegian	Erik Poppe	Not nominated
Palestine	The Olive Harvest	موسم الزيتون	Arabic	Hanna Elias	Not nominated
Philippines	Crying Ladies		Filipino, English, Philippine Hokkien, Mandarin	Mark Meily	Not nominated
Poland	The Welts	Pręgi	Polish	Magdalena Piekorz	Not nominated
Portugal	The Miracle According to Salomé	O Milagre Segundo Salomé	Portuguese	Mário Barroso	Not nominated
Romania	Orient Express		Romanian	Sergiu Nicolaescu	Not nominated
Russia	Night Watch	Ночной дозор	Russian	Bekmambetov" | Timur Bekmambetov	Not nominated
Serbia and Montenegro	Goose Feather	Јесен стиже, дуњо моја	Serbian	Ljubiša Samardžić	Not nominated
Slovenia	Beneath Her Window	Pod njenim oknom	Slovene	Metod Pevec	Not nominated
South Africa	Yesterday		Zulu	Darrell Roodt	Nominated
South Korea	Taegukgi	태극기 휘날리며	Korean	Kang Je-gyu	Not nominated
Spain	The Sea Inside	Mar adentro	Spanish, Galician, Catalan	Alejandro Amenabar	Won Academy Award
Sweden	As It Is in Heaven	Så som i himmelen	Swedish, English, Italian	Kay Pollak	Nominated
Switzerland	My Name Is Bach	Mein Name ist Bach	German	Dominique de Rivaz	Not nominated
Taiwan	20 30 40		Mandarin, Cantonese, Taiwanese Hokkien	Sylvia Chang	Not nominated
Thailand	The Overture	โหมโรง	Thai	Ittisoontorn Vichailak	Not nominated
Ukraine	A Driver for Vera	Водитель для Веры	Russian	Pavel Chukhrai	Disqualified
Uruguay	Whisky		Spanish, Italian	Juan Pablo Rebella and Pablo Stoll	Not nominated
Venezuela	A Dot and a Line	Punto y raya	Spanish	Elia Schneider	Not nominated

== Notes ==
- Colombia originally submitted Maria Full of Grace by Joshua Marston, but it was disqualified because the Academy ruled that it was not Colombian enough due to its American director and key American crew members. Colombia submitted El rey by José Antonio Dorado as a replacement.
- Hong Kong submitted Running on Karma by Wai Ka-fai and Johnnie To, but it was disqualified by the Academy, which cited problems with the film's release date.
- Ukraine submitted A Driver for Vera by Pavel Chukhrai, but it was disqualified because the Academy determined that the film was primarily Russian-produced, and thus not eligible as Ukraine's submission.
