= Ministry of Gender, Family and Children =

Government ministry of the Democratic Republic of the Congo

The Ministry of Gender, Family and Children (French: Ministère du genre, famille et enfant) is a government ministry of the Democratic Republic of the Congo.

== History ==
An Executive Secretariat responsible for gender was established by Presidential Order on 8 February 1980. As the General Secretariat for the Status of Women, this evolved into a branch of the state party, the Popular Movement of the Revolution (MPR). It became the Department of Women's Affairs in 1983, and was kept as the Department of Women's Affairs in the February 1985 Executive Council. In 1987, it was detached from the government, as the MPR Executive Secretariat with responsibility for gender.

In 1990, a Ministry for Gender was established. In 1992, it became the General Secretariat, and was attached to other Ministries including the Ministry of Health, National Solidarity, and the Family, and from 1994 to 2001, the Ministry for Health, Welfare, and Family Affairs. In 2003, the Ministry of Gender and Family was recreated, and in 2006 it became the Ministry of Gender, Family and Children.

== Responsibilities ==
The ministry is responsible for gender integration across government ministries and establishments and oversees implementation of the 2015 Law on Parity, Family Code reforms and the Maputo Protocol and CEDAW. It initiates and implements child protection policies, socio-economic disparities, family wellbeing and leads campaign against sexual and Gender-Based Violence (GBV).

== Ministers ==
- Geneviève Inagosi (2012-2014)
- Bijou Mushitu Kat (2014-2015)
- Marie-Louise Mwange (2015-2017)
- Chantal Safou Lopussa (2017–2019)
- Béatrice Lomeya Atilite (2019-2021)
- Gisèle Ndaya Luseba (2021–present)
