= Saša Tabaković =

Slovenian actor

Saša Tabaković (born April 20, 1981) is a Slovenian actor, born to Bosnian parents. After finishing his studies at High School for Music (he was playing an accordion), he entered to study a play on Academy for Theater, Radio, Film, Television, where he graduated in 2005. For the diploma performance of Goldberg in "The Birthday party" by H. Pinter he was awarded with University Preseren award in 2005. Since that year he is a permanent member of Slovenian National Theater Drama in Ljubljana, where he plays notable and main roles from classical and modern drama. He received several awards for his creative work. He often sings sevdah, traditional Bosnian music, with different musical groups. He is married to Slovenian actress Polona Juh.

== Notable theatre roles ==
- Lisander in performance "A Midsummer Night's Dream" by William Shakespeare
- Gaveston in performance "Edward the Second" by Christopher Marlowe
- Oedipus in performance "Oedipus in Corinth" by Ivo Svetina
- A Man in performance "The Class" by Matjaz Zupancic
- Zacharie Moirron in performance "Moliere or The Cabal of Hypocrites" by Mikhail Afanasevich Bulgakov
- Tigellinus in performance "Nero" by Andrej Rozman Roza, Davor Bozic
- B in performance "Rough for Theatre II" by Samuel Beckett
- Sergei Pavlovich Voynitzev in performance "Platonov" by Anton P. Chekhov
- Dorian Gray in performance "The Picture of Dorian Gray" by Oscar Wilde
- Pyotr Vasilyevich Bessemenov in performance "The Petty Bourgeois" by Maxim Gorky
- Ken in performance "Red" by J. Logan
- Andrei Prozorov in performance "Three Sisters" by Anton P. Chekhov
- Richard II in performance "Richard III + II" by W. Shakespeare, Pandur
- Barnabas and Teacher in performance "Tha Castle" by Franz Kafka
- Roberto in performance "The Lovers" by Carlo Goldoni
- Son in performance "Wake" by N. Pop Tasic
- Henry (Harry) James in performance "Alice in bed" by Susan Sontag
- Marcelo in performance "A New Race" by Matjaz Zupancic
- Biedermann in performance "Biedermann und die Brandstifter (The Fire Raisers)" by Max Frisch
- Franz Gotlieb Glass in performance "Cabaret Casper" by Tena Stivicic
- Ivan Krizovec in performance "In Agony" by Miroslav Krleza
- Septimus Smith in performance "Mrs. Dalloway" by Virginia Woolf
- Man 1 in performance "The Day I was No Longer Me" by R. Schimmelpfennig
- Eugeniusz in performance "Tango" by S. Mrozek
- He in performance "Dust" by H. Pinter, E. Mahkovic, D. Šilec Petek
- Helmuth Thiel in performance "God" by F. von Schirach
- Zoran in performance "The Liberation of Skopje" by D. Jovanović
- Bozon in performance "Mosquitoes" by Lucy Kirkwood
- Ferdinando in performance "Villeggiatura Trilogy" by C. Goldoni

== Filmography ==
- the role of Ado in In the Mountains by Miha Hočevar
- the role of Jasha in Beneath Her Window by Metod Pevec
- the role of Ian in A weekend in Brighton by Slavko Hren
- the role of Ivan Mrak in Ivan and Karla by Alma Lapajne
- the role of Choirmaster in Little trouble girls by Urška Djukić
