= Chérubin Okende Senga =

Congolese politician (1961–2023)

Minister of Transport and Communication
- In office 12 April 2021 – 28 December 2022
- Preceded by: Didier Mazenga Mukanzu

Member of the National Assembly of the Democratic Republic of the Congo
- In office 30 November 2018 – 13 July 2023
- In office 2003–2005

Personal details
- Born: 5 October 1961
- Died: 13 July 2023 (aged 61) Kinshasa, Democratic Republic of the Congo
- Party: Together for the Republic
- Education: University of Kinshasa

Chérubin Okende Senga (5 October 1961 – 13 July 2023) was a Congolese politician of Ensemble pour la République (Together for the Republic). He served as Minister of Transport and Communication from 2021 to 2022. He also served as technical administrator of Lignes Aériennes Congolaises.

== Biography ==
Born on 5 October 1961, Okende grew up in the Sankuru province and was a polyglot, speaking fluent Swahili, Lingala, Kikongo, French, and English. He graduated from the Institut supérieur de statistique in 1989. He also earned a master's degree from the University of Kinshasa in 2013, and subsequently a doctorate in public law from the same university in 2016.

From 1989 to 1999, Okende was head of service at the local production department of the Office congolais de contrôle (OCC). From 1992 to 2005, he was secretary-general of the Syndicat autonome des travailleurs of the OCC. He served as national president of the Confédération générale de syndicat autonome from 2003 to 2005 before serving as technical administrative director of the Fond de Promotion de l’Industrie from 2005 to 2008, for which he served as interim administrative director-general from 2010 to 2012.

Okende worked as an internal auditor for the OCC from 2012 to 2014. He finally left the OCC in 2019 after directing the hydrocarbons department.

=== Political career ===
From 1999 to 2006, Okende was national vice-president of the Société civile du Congo. At the same time, he was civil society delegate for intra-Congolese dialogue in Pretoria. He served in the National Assembly from 2003 to 2005 before becoming national chair of the Front social des indépendants républicains in 2006. From 2019 to 2020, he was spokesperson for the Lamuka Coalition after his return to the National Assembly on 30 December 2018. On 12 April 2021, he was appointed Minister of Transport and Communication.

In December 2022, Moïse Katumbi announced his candidacy for the 2023 presidential election and the departure of the party Ensemble pour la République from the Lamuka Coalition. Close to Katumbi, Okende left the Lukonde cabinet.

=== Assassination ===
On 13 July 2023, Okende was found dead in his car with gunshot wounds in Kinshasa. The Congolese government denounced his assassination, with the President, Félix Tshisekedi, releasing a statement saying he had requested authorities to open an investigation into the "despicable act". Katumbi described Okende's death as a "political assassination" and that he believed he had been kidnapped the day before his death. Okende's family subsequently filed a complaint with the Kinshasa-Gombe prosecutor against Okende's "arbitrary arrest and murder".

In February 2024, the Attorney General of the Court of Cassation of Kinshasa announced that Cherubin Okende had committed suicide. In April 2024, the family of Chérubin Okende filed a complaint “against unknown persons”; the family contested the theory of suicide put forward by the prosecution.
