= First Matata government =

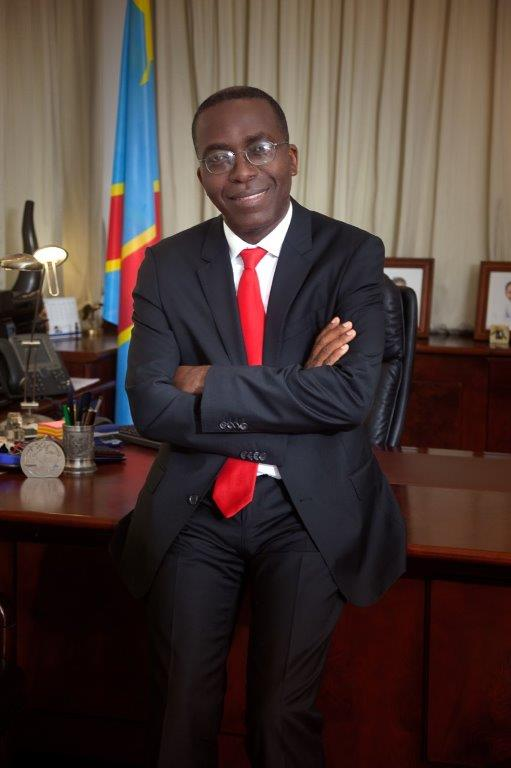
- Date formed: April 28, 2012
- Date dissolved: December 7, 2014

People and organisations
- President: Joseph Kabila
- Head of government: Matata Ponyo Mapon
- Member party: PPRD

History
- Predecessor: Muzito III
- Successor: Matata II

The First Matata cabinet was the government of the Democratic Republic of the Congo under Matata Ponyo Mapon from April 28, 2012, to December 7, 2014.

== Background ==
The government was formed when Matata was appointed Prime Minister in 2012, and was composed of two deputy prime ministers, 26 ministers, and eight deputy ministers.

== Prime Minister ==
Image	Portfolio	Name	Party
	Prime Minister	Matata Ponyo Mapon	PPRD

== Deputy Prime Ministers ==
Image	Portfolio	Name
N/A	Budget	Daniel Mukoko Samba
	National Defense and Veterans Affairs	Alexandre Luba Ntambo

== Ministers ==
Image	Portfolio	Name
N/A	Delegate to the Prime Minister; Finance	Patrice Kitebi Kibol Mvul
N/A	Land Affairs	Robert Mbwinga Bila
N/A	Social Affairs, Humanitarian Assistance, and National Solidarity	Charles Nawej Mundele
	Foreign Affairs, International Cooperation, and Francophonie	Raymond Tshibanda
N/A	Agriculture and Rural Development	Jean Chrisostome Vahamwiti Mukesyayira
N/A	Land Use Planning, Urban Planning, Housing, Infrastructure, Public Works, and Reconstruction	Fridolin Kasweshi
	Employment, Work, and Social Security	Modeste Bahati Lukwebo
	Primary, Secondary, and Vocational Education	Maker Mwangu Famba
N/A	Higher Education, University and Scientific Research	Chelo Lotsima
N/A	Environment, Nature Conservation, and Tourism	Bavon N'Sa Mputu Elima
N/A	Public Service	Jean-Claude Kibala
	Gender, Family, and Children	Geneviève Inagosi
	Hydrocarbons	Crispin Atama Tabe
N/A	Industry, Small and Medium Enterprises	Remy Musungayi Bampale
N/A	Interior, Security, Decentralization and Customary Affairs	Richard Muyej
N/A	Youth, Sports, Culture and Arts	Banza Mukalay
	Justice and Human Rights	Wivine Mumba
N/A	Mining	Martin Kabwelulu
	Media, Parliamentary Relations, and New Citizens	Lambert Mende Omalanga
	Modernization	Celestin Vunabandi
N/A	Treasury	Louise Munga Mesozi
	Telecommunications	Tryphon Kin-Kiey Mulumba
N/A	Water Resources and Electricity	Bruno Kapanji Kalala
	Public Health	Felix Kabange
N/A	Transport	Justin Kalumba Mwana Ngongo
N/A	Economy and Trade	Jean-Paul Nemoyato Begepole

== Vice Ministers ==
Image	Portfolio	Name
N/A	Foreign Affairs	Célestin Tunda Yakasende
N/A	Budget	Abayuwe Liska
N/A	International and Regional Cooperation	Dismas Magbengu Swana Emin
N/A	Human Rights	Sakina Binti
N/A	Decentralization and Customary Affairs	Aegis Ngokoso
	Primary, Secondary, and Vocational Education	Maguy Rwakabuba
N/A	Finance	Roger Shulungu Runika
N/A	Planning	Sadock Bigunza
