= Munongo =

Munongo is a surname. Notable people with the surname include:

- Believe Munongo (born 2009), French footballer
- Dominique Munongo (born 1961), Congolese politician
- Godefroid Munongo (1925–1992), Congolese politician
