= Maguy Rwakubaba =

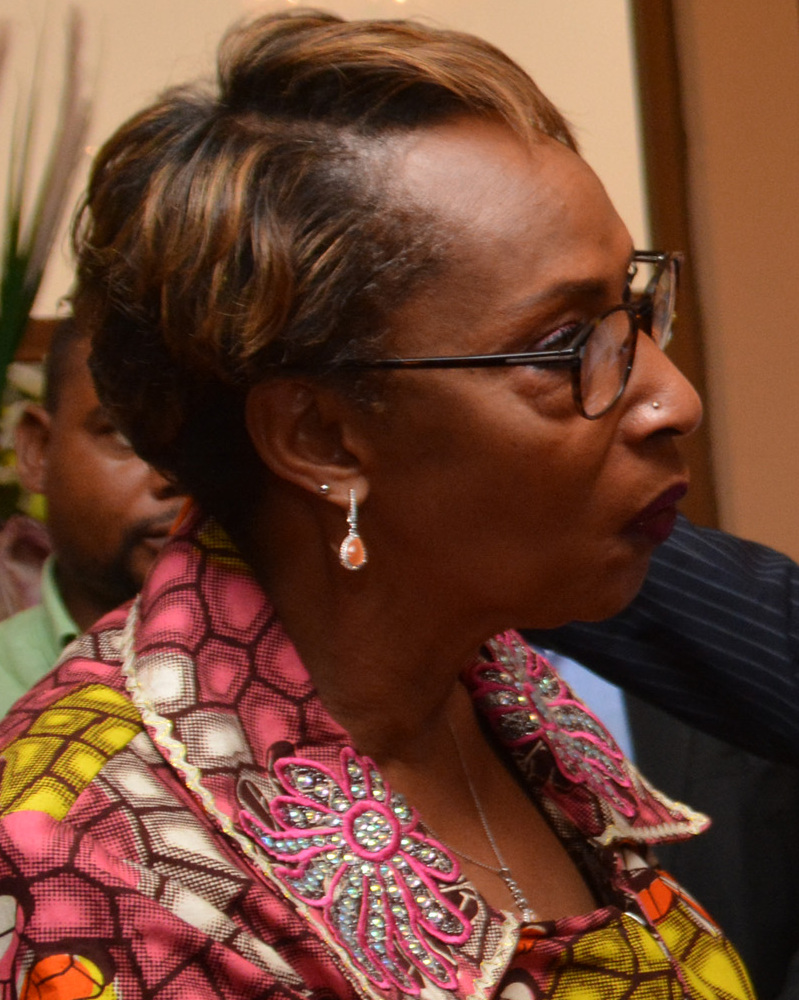
- Rwakubaba in 2015

National Deputy for Rutshuru
- Incumbent
- Assumed office January 28, 2019

Personal details
- Born: October 18, 1959 (age 66) Rutshuru, North Kivu, Belgian Congo (now Democratic Republic of the Congo)
- Party: UDCN (2019–2024); AFDC-A (2024-present)

Maguy Rwakubaba Ribagiza is a Congolese politician who has served as a national deputy for Rutshuru Territory in North Kivu since 2019.

== Biography ==
Rwakubaba is the daughter of former minister Cyprien Rwakubaba Shinga, who died in 2008. She was born in Rutshuru on October 18, 1959, and is a Tutsi.

She first joined the government in March 2012 as vice-minister of Primary, Secondary, and Vocational Education in the Matata I government. In December 2014, she was appointed vice-minister of energy in the Matata II government. In the Badibanga government appointed in December 2016, she became deputy Minister of Health. She then became deputy Minister of Budget in 2018 in the Tshibala government.

In 2018, she was among the several Congolese government officials singled out by Jeune Afrique as having dual nationalities, which is forbidden under Congolese law. Rwakubaba has held Belgian citizenship since October 12, 2001.

Rwakubaba is president of the political party Union of Democrats for National Concord (UDCN). She was elected national deputy for Rutshuru in the 2018 legislative elections. In July 2020, she was appointed vice-president of the Network of Women Parliamentarians in the National Assembly. She was re-elected in 2024, as part of the Alliance of Democratic Forces of Congo and Allies (AFDC-A).
