= Robert Mbwinga Bila =

Minister of Land Affairs
- In office April 29, 2012 – December 8, 2014
- Preceded by: Kisimba Ngoy
- Succeeded by: Dieudonné Bolengetenge Balea

Personal details
- Died: May 19, 2025
- Party: People's Party for Reconstruction and Democracy
- Education: Catholic University of Louvain
- Occupation: Professor

Robert Mbwinga Bila, also written as Robert Mbuinga, (died May 19, 2025) was a Congolese politician who served as Minister of Land Affairs from April 2012 until December 2014.

== Biography ==
Mbwinga attended the Catholic University of Louvain in Leuven, Belgium, where he earned a doctorate in applied economics. He then became a professor in management sciences at the University of Kinshasa. Mbwinga served as an member of Parliament for Bas-Congo, part of the People's Party for Reconstruction and Democracy (PPPD). While serving as MP for Bas-Congo, he was also the deputy Minister of Foreign Affairs around 2006.

In April 2012, Mbwinga was appointed Minister of Land Affairs in the First Matata government. In July 2012, he spoke at a conference where he pledged reforms to Congolese land laws, which had not been updated since 1973. This had been touched on by Mbwinga earlier in June, when he stressed the need to look to other African countries' land reforms as a blueprint for a Congolese land reform that ends violent land conflicts. In 2013, Mbwinga worked with Kasaï-Oriental governor Alphonse Ngoyi Kasanji to seize land from the Bakwanga Mining Company. A land code was developed by Mbwinga by May 2014, which he said worked with other ministries like the Ministry of Forests and the Ministry of Mines. According to Mbwinga, the primary goal of this land code was to end land disputes. In 2014, he attended a conference with other African Ministers of Land.

On December 8, 2014, Mbwinga was replaced as Minister of Land Affairs by Dieudonné Bolengetenge Balea.

Mbwinga passed away on May 19, 2025.
