= Clotilde Mutita Kalunga =

Congolese teacher and politician

Clotilde Mutita
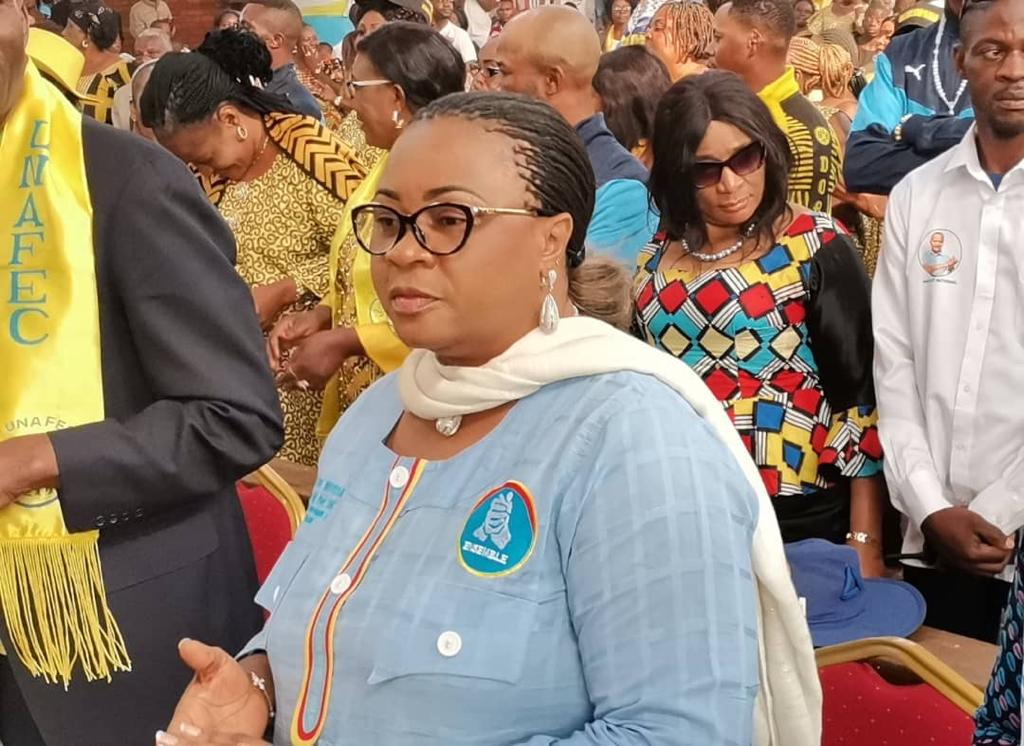

Member of the National Assembly of the Democratic Republic of the Congo
- Incumbent
- Assumed office 2023
- Constituency: Lubumbashi

Personal details
- Born: Clotilde Mutita Kalunga Sebente Mwepu; 23 September 1971 Lubumbashi, Haut-Katanga, Democratic Republic of the Congo
- Party: Together for the Republic
- Children: Several
- Occupation: Politician, Teacher

Clotilde Mutita Kalunga Sebente Mwepu is a Congolese politician and educator, currently serving as a member of the National Assembly (2023–2028 term) representing the Lubumbashi-Ville constituency. She was born on September 23, 1971, in Lubumbashi, Haut-Katanga Province, Democratic Republic of the Congo.

== Biography ==
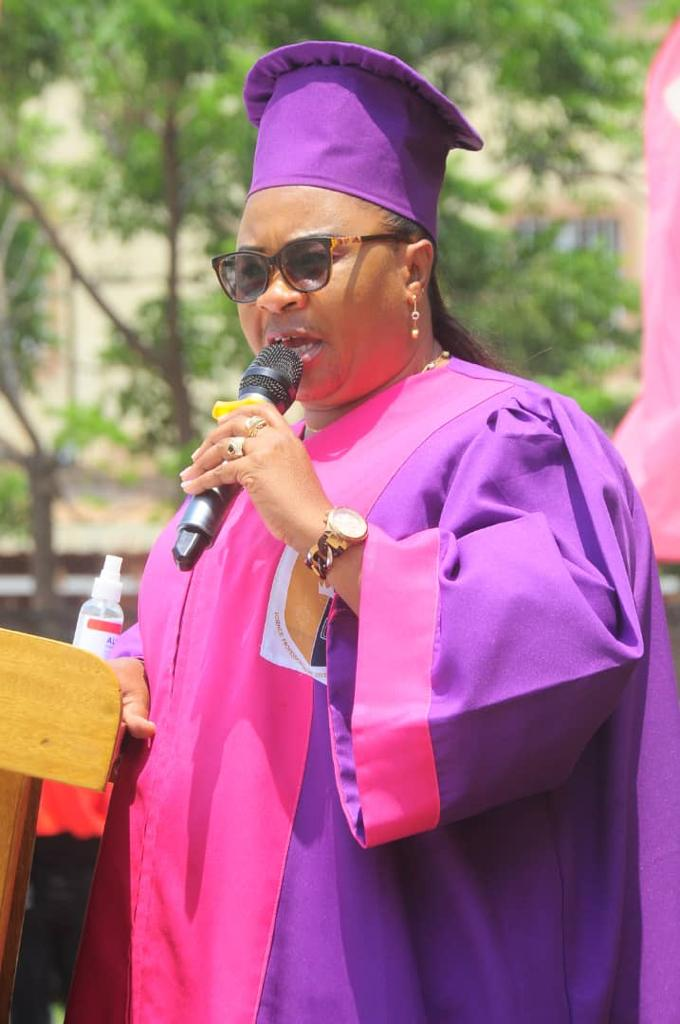
Clotilde Mutita, Dean of the Faculty of Education Sciences at Maria-Malkia University Institute

Clotilde spent her childhood and adolescence in Kipushi, Lubumbashi, and Kafubu. She completed her secondary education at Kwesu-kafubu High School, obtaining a diploma in biology-chemistry. She started medical studies but later paused to focus on family responsibilities. She later pursued higher education in peace education, conflict management, and leadership at the Maria-Malkia University Institute in Lubumbashi, earning a bachelor's degree in peace education and conflict management. With her expertise, she teaches leadership and ethics at various universities. She served as the Dean of the Faculty of Education Sciences at Maria-Malkia University Institute and was also the administrative secretary of the Don Bosco School of Political Economy (EcoPo).

She was elected in Rome in 2009 as the confederal president of the former students of the Daughters of Mary Help of Christians Salesians of Don Bosco for Africa and Madagascar, re-elected in 2015.

== Political career ==
Clotilde Mutita served as deputy mayor of Lubumbashi. In 2015, she resigned from her position to express her allegiance to her party, the National Union of Federalist Democrats (Unadef), one of the signatories of the open letter urging President Joseph Kabila to hold elections on schedule.

She is the deputy coordinator responsible for ideological training and mobilization of the Together for the Republic party in the Haut-Katanga province, under the leadership of businessman and politician Moise Katumbi Chapwe.

She was elected both as a national and provincial deputy for the Lubumbashi-Ville constituency in the December 20, 2023 legislative elections.

== Police Violence ==
On December 31, 2017, the lay coordination committee called for demonstrations in various parishes of the DRC. Unexpectedly, police and FARDC were deployed outside churches to prevent these demonstrations. Arbitrary arrests and mistreatment occurred at the Saints-Pierre-et-Paul Cathedral in Lubumbashi and the basilica in Kenya where tear gas was used inside the church.

Twenty young Catholics were arrested and detained in a police cell. Clotilde Mutita, honorary mayor of Lubumbashi, who was supervising the demonstrators outside the Saints-Pierre-et-Paul Cathedral, was mistreated and taken to the Don Bosco Polyclinic due to injuries sustained. She had lost consciousness after receiving several blows to her foot from a police officer and was left for dead on the cathedral steps.
