= Monaco Resources Group =

Monaco Resources Group is a Monaco-based financial services holding company specializing in natural resources.

The company operates in Africa and Europe. It has 5,500 employees worldwide.

== Background ==
In 2016, Rob Bear, Vice President of the mining company Alcoa, stated that he refused "any direct contact" with Monaco Resources Group.

It took over Necotrans' assets in 2017.

== Subsidiaries ==
- La Société des Bauxites de Guinée (SBG)
- Metalcorp
