= Alumina Company of Guinea =

Mining company of Guinea

The Alumina Company of Guinea (ACG-Fria), also commonly called Friguia, is a bauxite mining company and alumina producer based in Fria, Guinea, and is a wholly owned subsidiary of Russian aluminium giant United Company Rusal. As of 2026, the 650,000 tons per year plant, which opened in 1960, remains the only alumina refinery that has so far been built in Africa. While Guinea has one of the largest reserves of bauxite in the world and produces a large percentage of it, almost all of it leaves the country unrefined.

The plant was last shut down in 2012 and resumed operations in May 2018. 381,000 tonnes were produced in 2025.

== History ==
2011 rail network 1000 mm gauge 1435 mm gauge

The first bauxite mining operation in Guinea was conducted by Compagnie des Bauxites du Midi, a subsidiary of Aluminium Limited, exploiting minor deposits of high quality bauxite (60% alumina content) on Kassa Island from 1952 to 1961, at which point the government took control of the almost depleted mine. The second project of bauxite mining in Guinea was initiated in 1956 at Fria.

Shipments from Kassa Island began on 26 September 1952 and were principally directed to Port Alfred (Arvida smelter). The plant had equipment for crushing, washing and drying the bauxite and a capacity of 250,000tpa. A prospecting expedition had been undertaken in 1936.

Bauxite in French West Africa (long tons)
Year	Produced	Shipped	to Canada
1952	108	58	58
1953	333	370	348
1954	424	449	423
1955	485	442	382

Guinea after an overwhelming vote was the first country in West Africa to gain independence from France on 2 October 1958. The peaceful transition was however not amicable and France left behind an economy in distress.

Fria Compagnie Internationale pour la Production de l'Alumine
Company	Ownership
(United States) Olin Mathieson Chemical Corp	48.5%
(France) Pechiney-Ugine	26.5
(United Kingdom) British Aluminum Co Ltd	10
(Switzerland) Aluminium Industrie AG	10
(Germany) Vereinigte Aluminiumwerke AG	5

The company began construction of the Bayer process alumina refinery in 1957. The open pit mine opened in 1959 and the first alumina was produced on 23 March 1960 with the plant turning out 550 tonnes per day. The quality of the trihydrate bauxite allowed the digesters to operate at atmospheric pressure (low temperature). The target capacity was 480,000 tonnes per year (1,315tpd; it was attained by February 1961). Project cost was $150 million. The new town of Sabende was built to house some 5,000 workers. The kilns and the power plant burned oil, which initially came from the Caribbean. A 96-mile meter gauge railroad was laid to the Port of Conakry. The first shipments were made on 4 May 1960: 6,000 tons carried on the Spidola to Norway and 6,000 tons by the French ore carrier Paul Heroult to Douala and from there to the 45,000tpa French/Belgian Alucam smelter at Edea, Cameroon, built in 1958 at the 125MW hydroelectric plant. About 2.0 tonnes of alumina are required to produce 1.0 tonnes of metal.

Pechiney-Ugine was in charge of operations. Olin in February 1959 bought expropriation insurance covering $56 million from the International Cooperation Administration.

During 1966-1971, Alumina accounted for two thirds of exports. The company however spent more than two thirds of this income to import fuel, caustic soda, and equipment, and to pay some salaries and interest on its debt in hard currency. In 1979, with CBG now established as a second major producer, 12 million tons of bauxite were mined of which 2 million were converted to alumina. These two items generated $360 million in export earnings (96% of exports).

In 1966, the facility was being upgraded in a $4 million program to achieve a capacity of 525,000tpa.

Guinea exports (million $)
	1960	61		66	67	68	69	70	71		86	87	88
Agricultural			...	16.1	16.5	18.4	20.6	19.1	12.1	...			
Minerals			...	35.7	34.3	34.5	36.2	37.1	38.1	...	621	665.6	605.7
...Alumina	10.6	28.8	...	32.9	33.2	33.7	34.0	35.3	36.3	...	85	87.4	93.2
Total	54.8	61.2	...	51.9	50.8	52.9	56.8	56.2	50.2	...	655.2	687.1	650.9

Alumina (tonnes)
Year	Production	Exports
1960	185,289	171,376
1961	400,457	390,336
1962	457,875	458,654
1963	480,035	487,733
1964	484,000	477,000
1965	522,142	511,198
1966	525,310	520,218
...
1967	529,980	
1968	530,861	
1969	572,460	

Electricity Production and Fuel consumption
Year	Total	Fria	Total	Heavy fuel oil
Year	MwH		m^{3}	
1952	2,820	?		
1953	6,060	?		
1954	8,500	?		
1955	10,040	?		
1956	13,627	?		
1957	17,589	?		
1958	20,839	?	68,620	0
1959	30,866	9,135	64,737	864
1960	101,515	77,372	152,656	92,706
1961	134,482	109,261	224,238	149,501
1962	147,188	115,115	240,858	159,995
1963	155,993	119,258	?	
1964	168,009	124,890	?	

Effective 2 July 1973 the government obtained a 49% ownership, and the private consortium (Frialco) held on to 51% in the Societe d'Economie Mixte Friguia.

Noranda obtained 38.5% from Olin Mathieson in 1974. Plant capacity was 650,000 tonnes per year.

FRIALCO
Company	Ownership
(Canada) Noranda	38.5%
Pechiney Ugine Kuhlmann (PUK)	36.5
British Alcan Aluminum	10
Aluminium Suisse	10
Vereinigte Aluminiumwerke	5

Frialco (Jun 1989 to Oct 1998)
Company	Ownership
Noranda	30%
Pechiney	30
(Canada) Alcan	20
(Norway) Norsk Hydro	20

In the 1990s Friguia faced serious financial trouble. Frialco (as the result of a failed attempt by the government to further privatize the company) sold its stake for a symbolic $1 to the government in 1998. In 2000, the government and the Reynolds Metals Company formed ACG (Alumina Compagnie de Guinée) to operate the refinery, in which the government had a 15% stake, while retaining full ownership of the plant. Reynolds sold its interest to RUSAL in 2002 and in April 2006 RUSAL bought the government's 15% stake in ACG and the refinery, whose capacity then was 640,000tpa with the bauxite mine furnishing 1.9 million tpa.

Following the 2008 Guinean coup d'état, the new government sued Rusal in May 2009, alleging that the acquisition in 2006 was improper and ownership had to be returned. In September 2009 the court ruled in favor of the government, but Rusal's appeal succeeded in March 2010 when the appeals court confirmed that the International Court of Arbitration in Paris had jurisdiction as stipulated in the agreement between the government and Rusal. In 2014 the Paris court ruled that the acquisition had been legitimate and ordered the government to compensate Rusal for €250,000 in legal fees.

A long lasting pay dispute erupted on 4 April 2012 into a strike. Rusal evacuated their personnel for security concerns and said that equipment was being plundered and that a humanitarian crisis was in the making in the town that depended on the plant for its water and electricity supply. The plant had employed 3,200 workers. On 22 June 2016 Rusal agreed to begin restoration work at Fria on 10 January 2017, part of an agreement that laid out a schedule for the development of the Dian-Dian bauxite mine project, wholly owned by Rusal, and which also included a finding that the construction of an alumina refinery at Dian-Dian was not economically feasible. The plant was restarted on 20 June 2018, one day after shipments from the Dian-Dian bauxite mines had commenced.

1993 reserve estimate
Location	'000'000 tons	alumina %
Boke	5,100	45-60
Tougue	1,162	48
Dabola	670	43
Kindia	42	47
Fria	26	45
Total	7,000	
