= JUH =

JUH or Juh may refer to:

== People ==
- Juh (1825–1883), Native American leader
- Polona Juh (born 1971), Slovenian actress
- Jamarra Ugle-Hagan (born 2002), Australian rules footballer

== Other uses ==
- Chizhou Jiuhuashan Airport, in Anhui Province, China
- Hõne language, a Jukunoid language of Nigeria
- Johanniter-Unfall-Hilfe, a German humanitarian organisation
- Košice-Juh, a borough of Košice, Slovakia
