= Patrice Kitebi Kibol Mvul =

Congolese politician (1954–2025)

Delegate to the Prime Minister for Finance
- In office 28 April 2012 – 7 December 2014

Personal details
- Born: 11 September 1954 Kenge, Belgian Congo
- Died: 7 October 2025 (aged 71) Kinshasa, Democratic Republic of the Congo
- Party: USN
- Education: University of Kinshasa

Patrice Kitebi Kibol Mvul (11 September 1954 – 7 October 2025) was a Congolese politician.

== Life and career ==
Born in Kenge on 11 September 1954, Kitebi studied economics at the University of Kinshasa.

On 28 April 2012, he was named Delegate to the Prime Minister for Finance in the First Matata government by order of President Joseph Kabila. In November 2016, he was named Director-General of the Fonds de promotion d'industrie.

In 2021, Kitebi was charged with embezzlement alongside former Prime Minister Matata Ponyo Mapon and South African businessman Kristo Groblert in a case involving the construction of an industrial park in Kenge. On 15 November 2021, the Constitutional Court declared itself unable to hear the case. In June 2022, the Court of Cassation took up the case, yet again referred to the Constitutional Court. In November 2022, the Constitutional Court declared itself able to prosecute a former Prime Minister. The case resumed on 21 June 2023, though Kitebi was not included in this trial.

Kitebi Kibol Mvul died on 7 October 2025, at the age of 71.
