= Beneath Her Window =

2003 film

- Slovene: Pod njenim oknom
- Directed by: Metod Pevec
- Written by: Metod Pevec
- Produced by: Danijel Hočevar
- Starring: Polona Juh
- Cinematography: Žiga Koritnik
- Edited by: Janez Bricelj
- Music by: Aldo Kumar
- Production companies: E-motion Film; RTV Slovenia
- Release date: 2003
- Running time: 90 minutes
- Country: Slovenia
- Language: Slovenian

Beneath Her Window (Slovene: Pod njenim oknom) is a 2003 Slovenian film directed by Metod Pevec starring Polona Juh. It was Slovenia's submission to the 77th Academy Awards for the Academy Award for Best Foreign Language Film, but was not accepted as a nominee. The movie won several awards at Slovenian Film Festival.

== Cast ==
- Polona Juh — Duša
- Marijana Brecelj — Mother Vanda
- Saša Tabaković — Jasha
- Robert Prebil — Boris
- Zlatko Šugman — Grandfather
- Jožica Avbelj — Joži
- Andrej Nahtigal — Mirko
- Primož Petkovšek — Tone
- Tijana Zinajić — Meta
- Lotos Vincenc Šparovec — Astrologist

== See also ==
- List of submissions to the 77th Academy Awards for Best Foreign Language Film
