= El Rey (film) =

2004 film

El rey
- Theatrical release poster
- Directed by: Antonio Dorado
- Screenplay by: Antonio Dorado; Fulvio Gonzalez
- Produced by: Daniel Lesoeur
- Starring: Fernando Solórzano; Cristina Umaña; Marlon Moreno
- Cinematography: Juan Cristóbal Cobo; Paulo Pérez
- Edited by: Antonio Frutos
- Music by: Fernando Aguilar
- Production company: Fundación Imagen Latina
- Release date: 1 October 2004
- Running time: 93 minutes
- Countries: Colombia; France; Spain
- Language: Spanish

El Rey is a 2004 Colombian-French-Spanish film directed and co-written by Antonio Dorado. It was Colombia's submission to the 77th Academy Awards for the Academy Award for Best Foreign Language Film, but was not accepted as a nominee.

== See also ==
- Cinema of Colombia
- List of submissions to the 77th Academy Awards for Best Foreign Language Film
