= Célestin Tunda Yakasende =

Congolese politician (born 1954)

Deputy Prime Minister, Minister of Justice, and Keeper of Seals
- In office 26 August 2019 – 11 July 2020
- President: Félix Tshisekedi
- Prime Minister: Sylvestre Ilunga

Deputy Minister of Foreign Affairs
- In office April 2012 – December 2014
- President: Joseph Kabila
- Prime Minister: Augustin Matata Ponyo

Personal details
- Born: 21 July 1954 (age 71) Bukavu, Belgian Congo
- Party: PPRD
- Spouse: Julielle Kasongo Mbiye
- Education: University of Kinshasa; Catholic University of Congo (PhD)
- Occupation: Politician

Célestin Tunda Yakasende (born 21 July 1954) is a Congolese politician. He served as Deputy Minister of Foreign Affairs from April 2012 to December 2014 under the first Matata government. He was appointed Deputy Prime Minister, Minister of Justice, and Keeper of the Seals under the Ilunga government on 26 August 2019. In June 2020, he sent a set of comments to the National Assembly on proposed judicial reforms without informing the cabinet. He was briefly arrested on 27 June. He filed his resignation from his ministerial positions on 11 July.

== Early life and education ==
Célestin Tunda Yakasende was born on 21 July 1954 in Bukavu during the Belgian Congo period. He carried out his primary studies at the Royal Athanaeum in Bukavu and studied humanities at the Collège du Saint-Esprit des Jésuites in Bujumbura, Burundi, where he earned his state diploma in 1975. He obtained his Bachelor's degree in international public law from the University of Kinshasa (UNIKIN) in 1984 and became a lawyer at the Kinshasa-Gombe Bar Association that year. He stayed at UNIKIN for a few years thereafter as an assistant.

In his postgraduate training, he earned a certificate in international public law from The Hague Academy of International Law in 1993. He then earned several certificates in petroleum sciences from the French Institute of Petroleum in 1998. He earned a diploma in advanced studies in economics and development from the Catholic University of Congo (UCC) in 2011. His doctoral research focused on the external debt of developing countries.

== Political career ==
Tunda was a founding member of the People's Party for Reconstruction and Democracy (PPRD). He was elected as a member of the National Assembly in 2006. was appointed Deputy Minister of Foreign Affairs on 28 April 2012 as part of the first Matata government.

He was appointed Deputy Prime Minister, Minister of Justice, and Keeper of Seals under the Ilunga government on 26 August 2019. He launched an investigation into the head of state's 100-day program in February 2020, eventually leading to the conviction of Vital Kamerhe and other officials on charges of embezzlement.

In June 2020, Tunda sent a set of comments to the National Assembly on proposed judicial reforms without informing the cabinet. The reforms were proposed by Common Front for Congo (FCC) representatives Aubin Minaku and Garry Sakata, and they aimed to consolidate the responsibilities of the Minister of Justice. Tunda's actions were denounced by president Félix Tshisekedi. Tunda was arrested at his house on and was brought to the office of the prosecutor general on the afternoon of 27 June. He was released a few hours later. Prime Minister Sylvestre Ilunga held an emergency meeting in response, calling Tunda's arrest "brutal and arbitrary".

Tunda filed his resignation from his ministerial positions to Ilunga on 11 July 2020 after Tshisekedi demanded his resignation for several days.

== Personal life ==
He is married to Julielle Kasongo Mbiye.
