= Lora from Morning Till Evening =

2011 film

- Film poster
- Directed by: Dimitar Kotzev
- Written by: Dimitar Kotzev
- Produced by: Svetoslav Doytchinov; Galina Markova
- Starring: Milenita
- Cinematography: Vladimir Mihaylov
- Release date: 3 June 2011
- Running time: 93 minutes
- Country: Bulgaria
- Language: Bulgarian
- Budget: €5,000

Lora from Morning Till Evening (Bulgarian: Лора от сутрин до вечер) is a 2011 Bulgarian comedy film written and directed by Dimitar Kotzev. The film is based on the 2003 novel of the same name, which Kotzev himself wrote.

== Cast ==
- Milenita as Lora
- Hristo Petkov as The Sleek (Gladkia)
- Iva Gocheva as Silveto
- Antonina Kovacheva as Aunt Sia (as Dr. Antonina Kovacheva)
- Marten Roberto as Mario
- Yulian Kovalevski as The Moustache
