= Social Movement for Renewal =

Political party in the Democratic Republic of the Congo

Social Movement for Renewal Mouvement Social pour le Renouveau
- Leader: Pierre Lumbi
- Founded: 2006
- Headquarters: Kinshasa
- Ideology: Social democracy
- Political position: Centre-left
- Colours: Red
- Seats in the National Assembly: 27 / 500
- Seats in the Senate: 3 / 108

The Social Movement for Renewal (French: Mouvement Social pour le Renouveau) is a political party in the Democratic Republic of Congo. The party won 27 out of 500 seats in the parliamentary elections. In the 19 January 2007 Senate elections, the party won three out of 108 seats.

The current party president, Pierre Lumbi, is also the vice president of Ensemble pour le Changement, the political coalition supporting Moïse Katumbi for the 2018 presidential election.
