= Together for the Republic =

- Leader: Moïse Katumbi
- General Secretary: Dieudonné Bolengetenge Balea
- Founded: 18 December 2019
- Ideology: Liberalism
- International affiliation: Liberal International
- Seats in the National Assembly: 18 / 500
- Seats in the Senate: 0 / 108

Website
- ensemble.cd

Together for the Republic (French: Ensemble pour la République; abbreviated EPR) is a political party of the Democratic Republic of Congo created on 18 December 2019 by businessman Moïse Katumbi. Until his death in 2020, Pierre Lumbi was the secretary general of the party. replaced in April 2021 by Dieudonné Bolengetenge Balea.

Together for the Republic joined the Sacred Union, a parliamentary coalition that supports President Félix Tshisekedi, in December 2020. The party therefore supports the Lukonde cabinet which was formed in April 2021 and several of its members (Christophe Lutundula, deputy prime minister, Muhindo Nzangi, Modeste Mutinga, Chérubin Okende Senga, Christian Mwando Nsimba and Véronique Kilumba Nkulu).

In December 2022, Moïse Katumbi announced his candidacy for the 2023 Democratic Republic of the Congo general election. Katumbi also announces the departure of his Sacred Union party. Several ministers, members of Ensemble pour la République, then left the Lukonde government: Chérubin Okende Senga, Christian Mwando Nsimba and Véronique Kilumba Nkulu

On July 13, 2023, Chérubin Okende Senga, a party spokesperson, was found dead murdered by gunshot. Moïse Katumbi called for an international investigation, in particular with the help of the United States, the European Union and the United Kingdom, to be opened.

== Members ==
- Dominique Munongo

== Election results ==
=== Presidential ===
Election year	Candidate	Votes	%	Result
2023	Moïse Katumbi	3,256,572	18.32% (#2)	Lost
