= Gisèle Ndaya Luseba =

DRC politician and businessperson

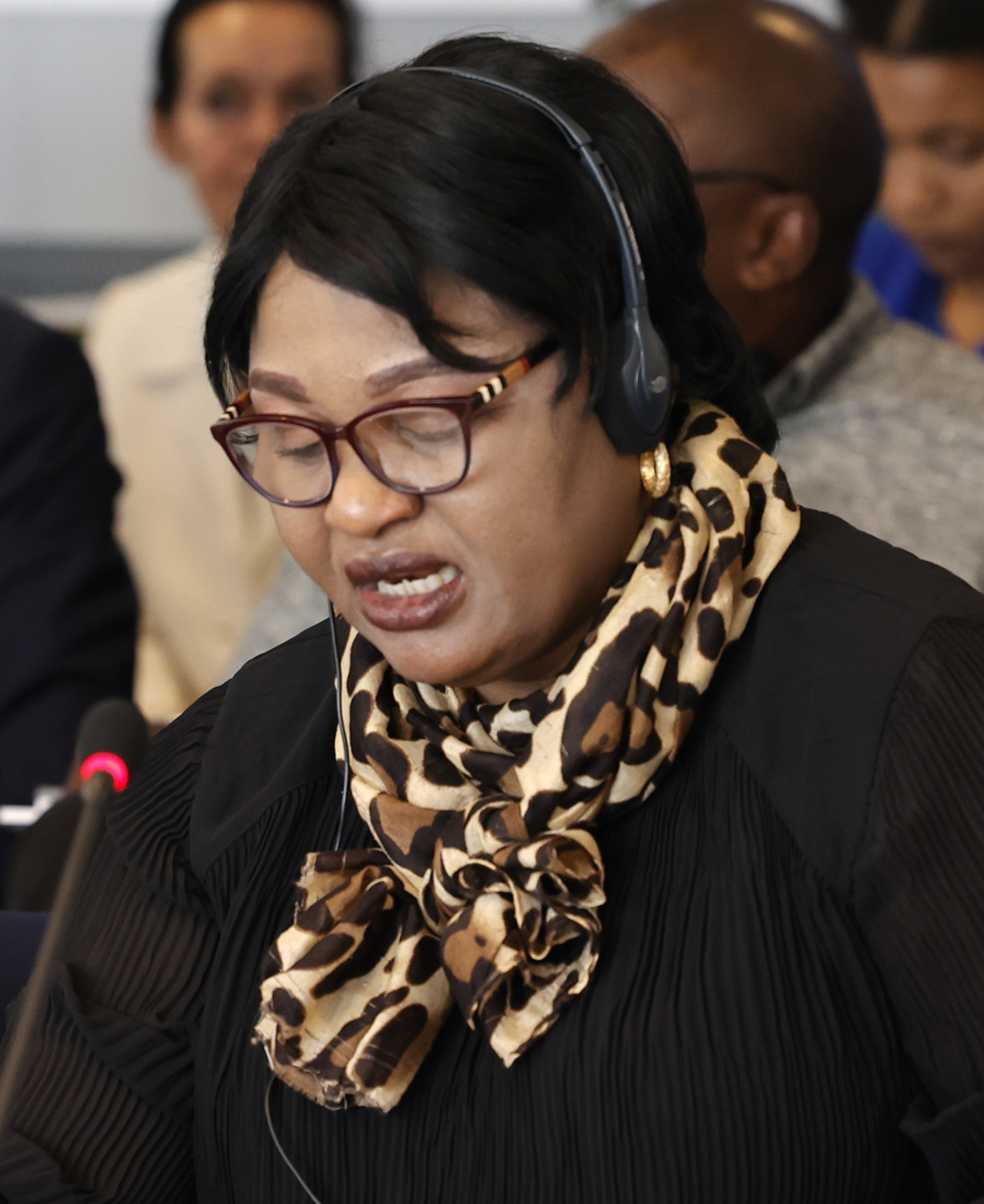
Gisèle Ndaya Luseba in 2022.

Gisèle Ndaya Luseba is a politician and businessperson in the Democratic Republic of the Congo. She is head of the political party Convention of Unified Labor Democrats (CDTU), and vice-president of Dynafec. On 12 April 2021 she replaced Béatrice Lomeya as Minister for Gender, Family and Children in the Lukonde cabinet.

== Life ==
Gisèle Ndaya Luseba graduated in marketing from ISC Kinshasa, and has another degree in theology. She has a masters in marketing economics, and is a specialist in political party management at UN Academia. In 2020 her PhD thesis was announced, "The role of women in political institutions in the Democratic Republic of Congo: utopia or reality?". She is married to a prominent magistrate.

Ndaya was appointed Minister for Gender, Family and Children in April 2021. In June 2021 a pan-African Conference on Gender Equality was held in Kinshasa. In July 2021, after the Generation Equality Forum convened by UN Women in Paris, Ndaya and Julienne Lusenge led a delegation of African women announcing the outcome of the Kinshasa conference, a proposed ten-year goal for African women, the Kinshasa Declaration.
