= Béatrice Lomeya =

Béatrice Lomeya Atilite is a politician in the Democratic Republic of the Congo.

In August 2019 Lomeya was announced as the Minister for Gender, Family and Children. In April 2021 she was replaced as minister by Gisèle Ndaya Luseba.
