= Geneviève Inagosi =

Congolese politician (born 1970)

Geneviève Inagosi

Geneviève Inagosi Bulo Ibambi Kassongo (born 1970) is a DRC politician. She is a deputy in the National Assembly, representing Wamba Territory as a member of the People's Party for Reconstruction and Democracy (PPRD). From 2012 to 2014 she was Minister of Gender, Family and Children in the government of Joseph Kabila.

== Life ==
Inagosi was born in 1970 in Bamapuno.

In the 2011 general election Inagosi was elected as deputy for Wamba. In April 2012 Inagosi was appointed to the cabinet of Joseph Kabila as Minister of Gender, Family and Children. She officially took office on 10 May 2021. In a December 2014 reshuffle, she was replaced as minister by Bijou Mushitu Kat in the 'Matata II' national cohesion government.

In the 2018 general election Inagosi was re-elected as the deputy for Wamba. In April 2021 she called on the government to improve infrastructure in Haut-Uélé, and help repair the Ninya-Isiro section of National Road No. 25. She also asked for an end to wage discrimination between provincial teachers and those in the capital. She has criticized Félix Tshisekedi's presidency for making unfulfilled promises:

Today the National Assembly is marching from violation to violation. The people are staring at us. We are not going to accept nonsense. When the time comes we will take care of ourselves. This country belongs to all of us.
