= Mila from Mars =

2004 film

Mila from Mars (Bulgarian: Mila ot Mars, Мила от Марс) is a 2004 Bulgarian film directed by Zornitsa Sophia. The so called "beginning of independent Bulgarian cinema" -the film was a no-budget film, but ended up with selection at many festivals and was Bulgaria's submission to the 77th Academy Awards for the Academy Award for Best Foreign Language Film, but was not accepted as a nominee. The film is distributed in Macedonia, Serbia, Slovenia, Bosnia and Herzegovina and Croatia by Art Servis Sarajevo. The film won the Heart of Sarajevo International Film Festival for Best Film and the Special Jury Prize for the ensemble cast at the same festival. It won two awards at Mannheim-Heildelberg IFF - Ecumennical Jury Prize nad Reiner Werner Fassbinder Prize for unconventionally narrated film. The film won total of 16 awards and was a national box office hit. Festival selection include Mar del Plata IFF, IFFI Goa, Warsaw IFF, New Directors/ New films in Nu York, Palm Springs IFF, Wiesbaden IFF Go East, Goteborg IFF, Busan IFF, Thessaloniki IFF, Haifa IFF, Sao Paulo IFF, Triest IFF, Istambul IFF and many more.

== See also ==
- Cinema of Bulgaria
- List of submissions to the 77th Academy Awards for Best Foreign Language Film
- List of Bulgarian submissions for the Academy Award for Best Foreign Language Film
