= Bijou Mushitu Kat =

Minister of Gender, Family, and Children
- In office December 8, 2014 – September 25, 2015
- Preceded by: Genevieve Inagosi
- Succeeded by: Marie-Louise Mwange

Interim Minister of Social Affairs, Humanitarian Action, and National Solidarity
- In office January 29, 2015 – September 25, 2015
- Preceded by: Adele Degbalese Kanda
- Succeeded by: Adele Degbalese Kanda

Personal details
- Born: March 29, 1971 (age 55) Lubumbashi, Democratic Republic of the Congo
- Children: 3
- Education: University of Lubumbashi
- Occupation: Teacher

Bijou Mushitu Kat is a Congolese politician who served as the Minister of Gender, Family, and Children in the Second Matata government between 2014 and 2015.

== Biography ==
Kat was born on March 29, 1971, in Lubumbashi, Democratic Republic of the Congo, and studied at the University of Lubumbashi where she obtained a degree in psychology. Kat then served as a teacher in Musoshi, and also as a mentor for illiterate mothers.

In 2008, she succeeded Kisimba Ngoyi as a national deputy. In 2011, she was elected as a member of parliament for Sakania. On December 7, 2014, she was appointed Minister of Gender, Family, and Children in the Second Matata government. In the middle of her term, she was appointed as interim Minister of Social Affairs, Humanitarian Action, and National Solidarity on January 29, 2015. Kat served in both ministerial positions until a government reshuffle on September 25, 2015.
