= Likasi (commune) =

Commune in the city of Likasi, Democratic Republic of the Congo

- Commune
- Location within Democratic Republic of the Congo
- Coordinates: 10.983°S 26.733°E
- Country: Democratic Republic of the Congo
- Province: Haut Katanga
- City: Likasi

Likasi is a commune of the city of Likasi, which is located in the Haut-Katanga Province of the Democratic Republic of the Congo. It is the second-most populous commune in Likasi.
