= Zornitsa Sofia =

Bulgarian artist and filmmaker (born 1972)

- Born: Zornitsa Nedyalkova Popgancheva; 22 July 1972 (age 53); Sofia, Bulgaria
- Occupations: Artist; filmmaker
- Years active: 2004–present

Zornitsa Nedyalkova Popgancheva (Bulgarian: Зорница Недялкова Попганчева; born 22 June 1972), known professionally as Zornitsa Sofia, (Note: Sometimes also transliterated as Zornitsa Sophia.) is a Bulgarian artist and filmmaker. She is best known for directing Mila from Mars (2004), which was Bulgaria's Academy Award for Best Foreign Language Film submission to the 77th Academy Awards. Her 2017 film Voevoda was screened at the Moscow International Film Festival.

== Biography ==
Sofia was born on 22 June 1972 in Sofia, Bulgaria. She graduated from the National Academy of Fine Arts in 1996. In 1997, she specialized in fine arts at the School of Visual Arts in New York, and in advertising and graphic design at the American University in Washington, D.C.

Sofia spent four years working as an art director for several international advertising agencies including Euro RSCG London. She took part in over 50 visual arts festivals and exhibitions around the world with her video art, installations and paintings before deciding to turn to filmmaking. In 2002, she specialized in film and television directing at the National Academy for Theatre and Film Arts under the supervision of Professor Ludmil Staikov.

== Filmography ==
- Mila from Mars (2004)
- Forecast (2008)
- Voevoda (2017)
- Mother (2022)
