= Euro RSCG London =

Coordinates: 51.520340°N 0.133188°W

Havas London
- Type: Public Limited Company
- Industry: Marketing, Advertising, Public relations
- Founded: 2003
- Headquarters: London, United Kingdom
- Number of employees: 193
- Parent: Havas
- Website: www.havasworldwide.co.uk

Havas London (formerly known as Euro RSCG London) is a London-based integrated advertising agency. It is part of the Havas Worldwide network (formerly known as Euro RSCG Worldwide) network which has 316 offices located in 75 countries throughout Europe, North America, Latin America, Asia-Pacific and the Middle East.

In September 2012 the Euro RSCG Worldwide network rebranded to Havas Worldwide.

== History ==
Euro RSCG London was first created by merging Colman RSCG and Horner Collis Kirvan.

In 1994, Euro RSCG's London office was relaunched as Euro RSCG Wnek Gosper by Mark Wnek and Brett Gosper who had been approached by the Euro RSCG network to turn the agency around. Brett Gosper left for New York in 2003. Mark Wnek also left in January 2004, whereafter the names of the founders were dropped and the agency was renamed Euro RSCG London.

== Renaming ==
Euro RSCG itself was renamed Havas Worldwide in 2012, and the London office was then renamed Havas Worldwide London. The name was later shortened to Havas London.

== Key clients ==
The agency works for global brands including Chivas Regal, Birds Eye, Reckitt Benckiser, Evian, PSA Peugeot Citroen, Unilever, Ideal Standard, Credit Suisse, Maggie's Centres, Mothercare and Mondelēz International.

Former clients include Abbey National, Iomega, Argos and Cadbury.

== Notable campaigns ==
Listed chronically.

- "Not at the Table", ad for Häagen Dazs. Won a D&AD Wood Pencil in 2000.
- "Megabytes" ad for Microsoft. Won a D&AD Wood Pencil in 2001.
- "Pageant", spot for VO5. Won a D&AD Yellow Pencil Award in 2012.
- "Metamorphosis", film for Credit Suisse. Won a "One Merit" award at The One Club in 2013.
- "Explore", campaign for Durex's e-commerce site in 2014. One spot used synchronous dual-screen technology to allow a phone or tablet app to show an alternative view when the main ad plays on TV.
- "Cut the Cliché", Valentine's Day spot for Durex.
- "The Heathrow Bears", a series of Christmas ads for Heathrow Airport started in 2016.

== See also ==
- Boase Massimi Pollitt
