= Pierre Lumbi =

Congolese politician (1950–2020)

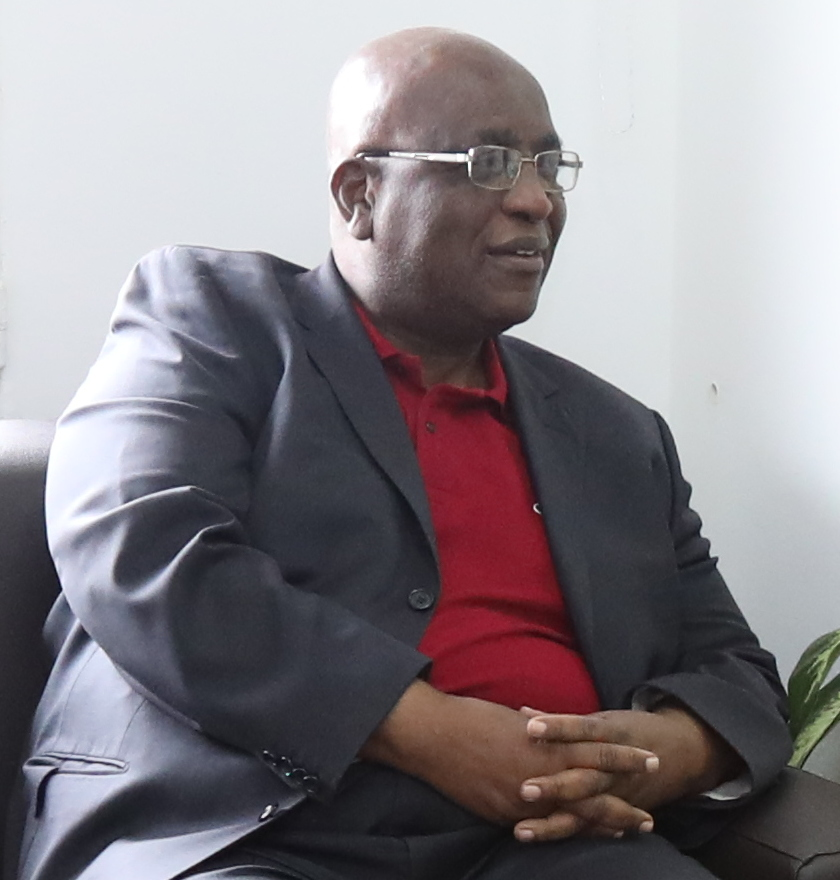
- Lumbi in 2017

Congolese Senator from South Kivu
- In office 2018-2020

Special Advisor on Security Matters to the President
- In office 2010-2015

Minister of State for Infrastructure, Public Works and Reconstruction
- In office 5 February 2007 – February 2010
- Succeeded by: Fridolin Kasweshi Musoka

Minister of Posts and Telecommunications
- In office 1994–1995
- Preceded by: Imbrahim Onbayo
- Succeeded by: Manderi Selli

Minister of Foreign Affairs
- In office 1992–1993
- Preceded by: Bagbeni Adeito Nzengeya
- Succeeded by: Mpinga Kasenda

Personal details
- Born: 11 March 1950 Costermansville, Belgian Congo (modern-day Bukavu, Democratic Republic of the Congo)
- Died: 14 June 2020 (aged 70) Kinshasa, Democratic Republic of the Congo
- Party: Mouvement Social pour le Renouveau (MSR)

Pierre Lumbi Okongo born in Costermansville, Belgian Congo (now Bukavu, Democratic Republic of the Congo) (11 March 1950 – 14 June 2020) was a Congolese activist, politician, and opposition leader. He was a prominent figure in the political landscape of the Democratic Republic of the Congo (DRC), known for his involvement in opposition movements and his role in advocating for political change.

== Early life and education ==
Pierre Lumbi Okongo, a native of Maniema, was born in 1950 in Bukavu to a modest family. Around 1954, his family was expelled to Burundi due to his father's involvement in the Mouvement national congolais-Lumumba and the Kitawala politico-religious movement, which opposed the Belgian colonial regime. He completed his primary education at the École Primaire des Frères de la Charité Buyenzi in Burundi (1956–1963) and his secondary education at the Collège Saint Paul in Bukavu (DR Congo), where he earned his state diploma in biochemistry (1963–1971). He then returned to Bujumbura and enrolled in the Faculty of Medicine at the Université Officielle du Burundi (UOB). However, after the tragic events that shook Burundi in 1972 (Ikiza), he received a scholarship and left for France. There, he pursued higher education in Lyon, earning a degree in clinical psychology.

== Social and civic engagement ==
In 1978, Pierre Lumbi Okongo decided to return to his country (Democratic Republic of the Congo) and chose to reorganize rural farmers by creating "Solidarité paysanne" in the city of Uvira in 1980, the very first secular Non-governmental organization (NGO) in the DRC. For 10 years, he coordinated several actions of "Solidarité Paysanne", particularly in advocacy and the social and economic development of farming communities. Initially in the Ruzizi Plain (in the Uvira region), then in the former Kivu province and the three new provinces created after the Kivu's division, before expanding to the entire country. Among the key activities of "Solidarité Paysanne" are:

- The creation of cooperatives for farmers (Mkulima), livestock breeders (Butuzi), and fishermen (COJEPU, Virugwe) in the Ruzizi Plain (in Uvira);
- Establishing the Sugarcane Growers Cooperative (COPASUKI);
- Setting up cooperative networks (FERCOOP and INTERCOOP) in South Kivu, North Kivu, and Maniema;
- Literacy programs for rural women (Projet Alpha), provision of drinking water (PEP), improving rural housing, and environmental protection (reforestation project) in the Ruzizi Plain;
- Establishing the Katobwe CEP, which oversaw projects on ox-drawn plows, plow cultivation, improving yields for farmers, livestock breeders, poultry farmers, fishers, rice growers, and fruit tree growers;
- Creating a training center (CF Bagira) in Bukavu, a free legal assistance office for farmers (BAJ), and a support and training program for single mothers (Maison de la femme);
- In Kinshasa, Solidarité Paysanne created a Chamber of Trades to promote and support artisans from the communes of Ndjili and Kimbanseke, as well as a national farmers' union (ASP) · , as well as a national farmer exchange and training program (PIEF).

Throughout his social engagement, Pierre Lumbi Okongo participated in international debates on the exploitation of the Third World, including the campaign "mieux se nourrir, vaincre la faim" in the 1980s.

== Political engagement ==
His entry into politics dates back to April 1990, when President Mobutu decided to liberalize political activities. Under the initiative of Pierre Lumbi Okongo, through his organization "Solidarité Paysanne," the country’s social organizations organized themselves into a national civil society to participate in and influence ongoing debates on democracy, human rights, and good governance.

Launched in April 1991 at the Bondeko Center in Limete (Kinshasa), the "Mouvement de la Société Civile" became involved in advocating for the organization of a National Sovereign Conference (conférence nationale souveraine) (CNS). When this movement succeeded in ensuring that delegates from social organizations outnumbered those from political parties, government institutions, and invited guests, Pierre Lumbi became the sole civil society delegation leader at the CNS (opened in August 1991) from a province (South Kivu) he was not originally from but one he strongly supported.

The dynamics of the civil society coalition, allied with opposition political parties grouped in the Sacred Union of Radical Opposition (USOR), dominated the CNS proceedings to the extent that its work was suspended by Mobutu's regime. To ensure this forum, a symbol of the fight against dictatorship for democracy resumed its work, Pierre Lumbi Okongo initiated the "Lay Coordination Committee," a group of Christian laypeople, which organized the "March of Hope" on February 16, 1992. This march, which was violently suppressed by Mobutu's forces and became the largest peaceful protest ever organized in the DRC With an estimated 2 million participants nationwide, it symbolized the people's demand for democracy and good governance, marking a pivotal moment in Congo's pro-democracy movement.

Pierre Lumbi Okongo subsequently participated in all negotiations between Mobutu's regime and the opposition, representing civil society leadership, including the Palais de Marbre 1 and 2 political negotiations (1992), Palais de Marbre 2 (1992), and the People's Palace negotiations. Following these discussions, Pierre Lumbi Okongo was appointed:

- Minister of Health, Family, and Social Affairs in the government of Etienne Tshisekedi in October 1991;
- Minister of Health in the government of Jean Ngunz Karl I Bond in November 1991 (he declined the position);
- Minister of Foreign Affairs in the government of Étienne Tshisekedi from the CNS in August 1992;
- Minister of Posts and Telecommunications in the government of Kengo Wa Dondo in July 1994.

During his political career, Pierre Lumbi Okongo was imprisoned three times: in Bukavu in 1990 by Mobutu's regime, and twice in Kinshasa, in 1993 by the Birindwa government and in 1997 by the AFDL.

After the fall of Mobutu, he disappeared from the political scene during the reign of Laurent-Désiré Kabila. He re-emerged with the rise of Joseph Kabila as President of the DRC. Pierre Lumbi Okongo was appointed director-general of studies and strategies at the presidency and participated in the Inter-Congolese Dialogue in South Africa (2002–2003). After the ceasefire agreement, he launched the Social Movement of Civil Society Leaders for their political engagement, which became a political party in November 2005 under the name Social Movement for Renewal (MSR). During this time, he also served as chief of staff and assistant to the special security advisor to the head of state, Samba Kaputo.

During the 2006 legislative elections, his party (MSR) became the second-largest political force in the parliamentary majority. Between 2006 and 2015, Pierre Lumbi Okongo successively served as:

- Minister of state in charge of infrastructure, public works, and reconstruction (2007–2010);
- Special security advisor to the head of state (2010–2015).

=== Sino-Congolese economic agreements ===
While Minister of State in charge of Infrastructure, Pierre Lumbi visited Beijing in the summer of 2007, laying the groundwork for a transformative economic agreement with China. The deal provides for 6.3 billion euros of investment, with 4.2 billion for public infrastructure development and 2.1 for mining works. Project management would be the responsibility of a joint enterprise, Sicomines, in which the DRC holds 32% of shares. The work would be assigned to the China Railway Engineering Corporation (CREC) and Synohydro Corporation, two Chinese corporations. It would include the construction of roads and railways, hospitals, universities, and housing. In return, the Chinese were promised access to copper, cobalt, and gold supplies.

== Later career ==
Opposed to Joseph Kabila's potential third term, he resigned from his position as special security advisor to the head of state. His resignation, a first in the country's history, triggered events that fractured the ruling Presidential Majority coalition. Following the split with the Presidential Majority in September 2015, the MSR joined the opposition. In March 2016, the MSR allied with six other parties to form the G7. In June of the same year, the G7 became one of the initiators of the Rally of Political and Social Forces for Change (Rassemblement). After the death of Étienne Tshisekedi, his son Félix Tshisekedi—now the current president of the Democratic Republic of the Congo (DRC)—took on the role of heading the political presidency of the Rassemblement, while Pierre Lumbi was appointed to the position of Chairperson of the Council of Elders and assumed leadership of the strategic presidency of the rassemblement coalition. In March 2019, Pierre Lumbi Okongo was elected senator for South Kivu in the legislative elections. In December 2019, the MSR joined five other parties to create "Ensemble pour la République," where he was appointed secretary-general. He held this position and served as senator for South Kivu until his death.

Among his last contributions as secretary-general of Ensemble pour la République, Pierre Lumbi Okongo called on Congolese citizens to unite in fighting COVID-19, urged politicians to avoid controversy and work together to combat the pandemic, and demanded transparency from the government regarding concrete measures implemented in Kinshasa and provinces to mitigate the socio-economic impacts of COVID-19. Additionally, his last efforts as a senator for South Kivu focused on addressing the floods that struck Uvira in April 2020. He launched a fundraising campaign to assist affected populations and called on the government to declare Uvira a disaster zone to provide immediate, medium, and long-term assistance to the affected populations.

== Death ==
On 14 June 2020, Lumbi died in Kinshasa from COVID-19 during the COVID-19 pandemic in the Democratic Republic of the Congo.
