= Marie-Louise Mwange =

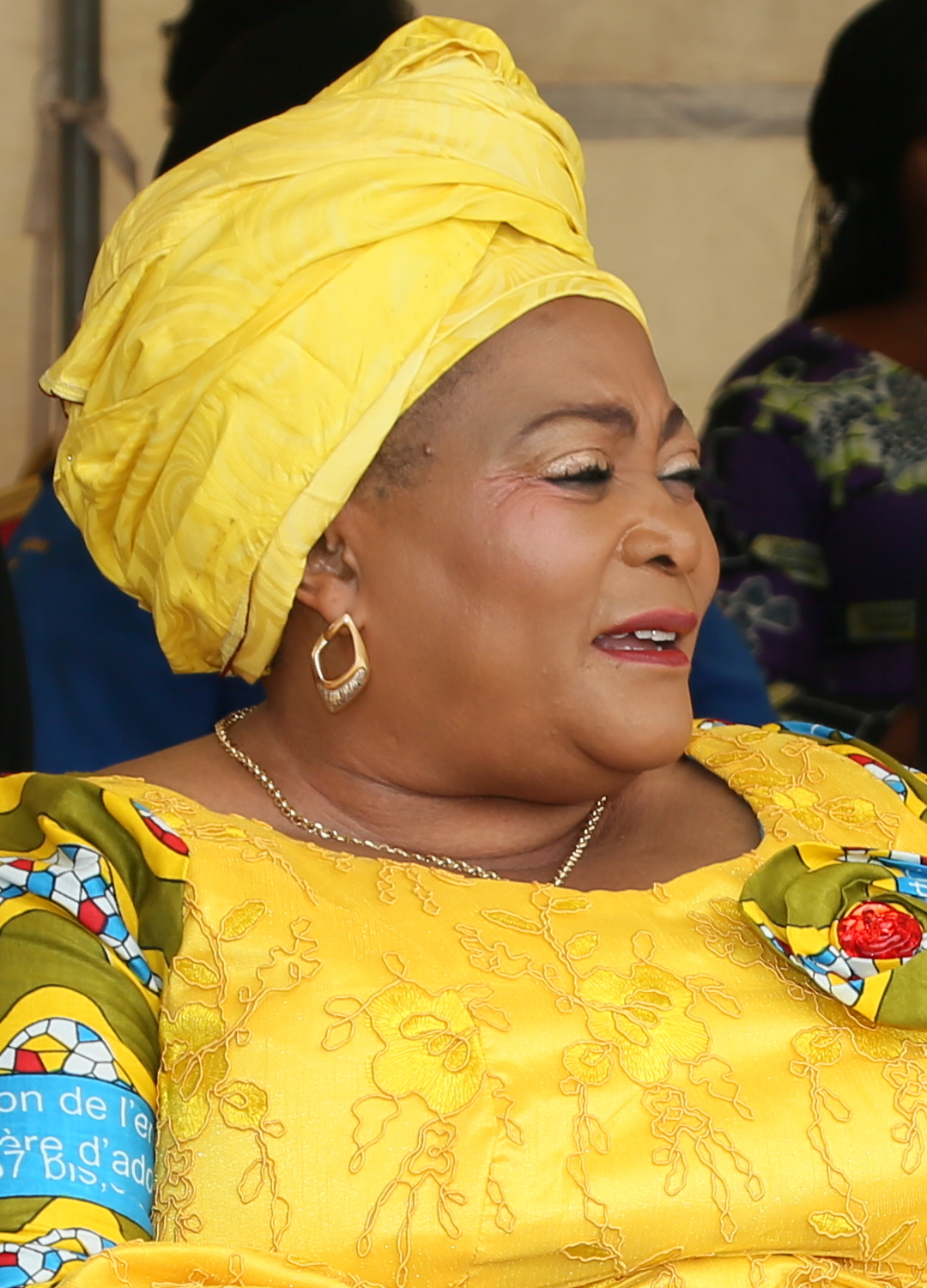
Marie-Louise Mwange in 2017

Marie-Louise Mwange (born 28 November 1961) is a Congolese politician and writer.

Mwange was the Minister of Gender, Child and Family of DR Congo from December 2016 to May 2017.

== Bibliography ==
- Puisqu'elles naissent femmes. Éditions Édilivre, 2011.
