= Polona Juh =

Slovenian actress

Polona Juh (born June 2, 1971) is a Slovenian actress. She is the daughter of the Slovenian actors Mojca Ribič and Boris Juh. After finishing her studies at High School for Ballet, she entered to study acting at the Academy for Theatre, Radio, Film and Television, where she graduated. Since 1995, she is a permanent member of Slovenian National Theatre Drama in Ljubljana.

She had more than 50 different film and theatre roles so far, including many lead roles.

== Notable theatre roles ==
- Hedwig in performance "The Wild Duck" by H. Ibsen
- Iphigeneia in performance "Iphigeneia in Tauris" by Euripides
- Hanako in performance "Hanjo - a play for classical Japanese theater" by Y. Mishima
- Aglaya in performance "The Idiot" by F.M. Dostoyevsky
- Miranda in performance "The Tempest" by W. Shakespeare
- Celimene in performance "The Misanthrope" by Molière
- Desdemona in performance "Othello" by W. Shakespeare
- Juliet in performance "Romeo and Juliet" by W. Shakespeare
- Masha in performance "The Seagull" by A.P. Chekov
- Natasha Ivanovna "Three Sisters" by A.P. Chekov
- Polly Peachum "The Threepenny opera" by B. Brecht
- Albertine "In search of Lost Time" by M. Proust
- Rosalind and the boy Ganymede in performance "As You Like It" by W. Shakespeare
- Agrafena Alexandrovna - Grushenka in performance "The Brothers Karamazov" by F.M. Dostoyevsky
- Anna Karenina in performance "Anna Karenina" by L.N. Tolstoy (2006)
- Dorine in performance "The Tartuffe" by J.B.P. Molière
- Ruth in performance "The Homecoming" by H. Pinter
- Clytemnestra in performance "The Oresteia" by Aeschylus
- Sofya Yegorovna in performance "Platonov" by A. P. Chekhov
- Elisabet Vogler in performance "Persona" by I. Bergman
- Sharlota, local starlet in performance "The Fall of Europe" by M. Zupančič
- Ophelia in performance "Hamlet" by W. Shakespeare
- Caesonia in performance "Caligula" by A. Camus
- Lady Anne in performance "Richard III + II" by W. Shakespeare, adaption Tomaž Pandur
- Frieda in performance "The Castle" by F. Kafka
- Margaret in performance "Faust" by J.W. Goethe, adaptation Tomaž Pandur
- Anna Karenina in performance "Anna Karenina" by L.N. Tolstoy, adaptation Dušan Jovanović (2016)
- Salome in performance "Salome" by O. Wilde
- Frau Martha Rull in performance "The Broken Jug" by Heinrich von Kleist
- Anna Petrovna in performance "Ivanov" by A. P. Chekhov
- Lidia in performance "The Wall, the lake" by D. Jovanovic
- Laura Lenbach in performance "In Agony" by M. Krleza
- Olivia in performance "Twelfth Night, or What You Will" by W. Shakespeare
- She in performance "Dust" by H. Pinter, E. Mahkovic, D. Šilec Petek

== Filmography ==
- the role of Bazilika in Fuck it! (Jebiga) by Miha Hočevar
- the role of Duša in Beneath Her Window (Pod njenim oknom) by Metod Pevec
- the role of Sonja in Couples game by M. Zupanič
- the role of Hana in Good Night, Missy by M. Pevec
- the role of Nataša in Projections by Z. Ogresta
- the role of Sonja in Southern Scum Go Home by G. Vojnović

She regularly takes part in various radio plays; she was also a voice actor for several animated characters and advertisements.

== Awards ==
For her work she received several awards at home and foreign countries:

- "Golden stick" - Theater Festival for Children, Slovenia, 1994
- "Stane Sever Fund for best actress", Slovenia, 1997
- "Golden bay's wreath for best actress" - Festival MESS, Sarajevo (Bosnia and Herzegovina), 2000
- "Golden laugh for best actress" - Days of Satire Festival, Zagreb (Croatia), 2000
- "France Prešeren Fund" - Slovene national award for artistic achievements, Slovenia, 2002
- "Vesna for best actress" - Slovene National Film Festival, Slovenia, 2003
- "Actress of the year" - Slovene National Film Festival, Slovenia, 2003
- "Silver George for best actress" - Moscow International Film Festival, Russia, 2005
- "Borštnik's award for best actress" - National Theater Festival, Slovenia, 2007
- "Župančič's award" - award for artistic achievements by City of Ljubljana, Slovenia, 2007
- "Borštnik's award for best actress" - National Theater Festival, Slovenia, 2009
- "Vesna for best actress" - Slovene National Film Festival, Slovenia, 2009
- "Golden Arena for best actress" - Pula Film Festival, Croatia, 2011
- "Borštnik's award for best actress" - National Theater Festival, Slovenia, 2013
- "Borštnik's award for best actress" - National Theater Festival, Slovenia, 2015
- "Borštnik's award for best actress" - National Theater Festival, Slovenia, 2025
