= Necotrans =

French logistics and transport company

- Industry: Logistics and transport
- Founded: 1985
- Founder: Richard Talbot
- Headquarters: Paris, France
- Key people: Grégory Quérel (Chairman)
- Services: Freight forwarding, oil and mining logistics, port terminals activities, equipment distribution
- Number of employees: 5 000 employees
- Website: necotrans.com

Necotrans was a French firm founded by Richard Talbot in 1985 and specialised in logistics and international transport: freight forwarding, oil and mining logistics, port terminals activities, equipment distribution. Grégory Quérel was the last Chairman of the group. Following financial troubles, the company underwent a bankruptcy procedure in 2017 ending up with the sale of individual parts to various investors. The brand rights were partially also transferred and were still in use in some of the entities as of 2018.

== History ==
Necotrans was founded by Richard Talbot in 1985 to focus on freight forwarding activity. In 1989, port management activities and ground logistics in Africa were launched. Necotrans acquired the automotive and equipment distribution activity in West Africa in 1992 to diversify its activities. In 1999, the firm grew in freight forwarding business with the acquisition and the creation of AMT, a logistics firm specialised in the oil industry and services. In 2005, Necotrans took on Vopak LMF France, an industrial logistics project, before adopting in 2012 the brand name Necotrans, encompassing all of the Group’s activities.

== Activities ==
The group’s major markets were located in Africa. Its headquarters were located in Avenue Georges V, Paris. It has an intensive expertise in the field of port operations in Africa, and the group has developed a network covering mainly the west coast of the African continent. The Company provides integrated services, from a point of origin to the delivery of the goods on site.

In 2014, Necotrans has won the bid for the autonomous Port of Dakar’s bulk terminal. A concession of agreement has been signed between Necotrans and the Port of Dakar for the bulk terminal on the breakwater 8. The state of Senegal has granted a 25-year concession to the Company. The development of a terminal for bulk, for a cost of 74 million euros, was intended to modernise the Port of Dakar. This terminal is dedicated to non-food heavy bulk freight, mostly for minerals. In addition to this investment, an amount of 20 million euros is intended to the construction of a new quay to facilitate unloading.

As the result of the tender launched in May 2014 by the authorities of Cameroon, the Necotrans group and the Kribi Port Multi Operators (KPMO) consortium, consisting of nine local operators, have been awarded the partnership contract for the operation and maintenance of the multipurpose terminal at the deep-water port at Kribi in Cameroon.

In 2015, Necotrans acquired Mining Company Katanga (MCK), a company specialised in civil engineering and logistics solutions for mining in the Democratic Republic of the Congo. This company is located in the southern province of Katanga, a region bordering Zambia called the Copperbelt and known for copper mining.

The group also created Africa Truck Solutions (ATS) in 2015.

== Key Figures ==
Last available figures for Necotrans Group before bankruptcy:

- Turnover: 1,063 million euros
- Staff Worldwide: 5,000 employees
- Staff in Africa: 4,500 employees
- Locations Worldwide: over 40 countries
- Locations in Africa: 25 countries
