= CTG =

CTG may refer to:

== Businesses and organizations ==
=== Businesses ===
- Channel Technologies Group, an American piezoelectric materials manufacturer
- Channel Tunnel Group, the British half of the Channel Tunnel consortium
- China Three Gorges Corporation, a Chinese power company
- Computer Task Group, an American information technology staffing company
- The Counterterrorism Group, Inc., a subsidiary of Paladin 7
- VietinBank, a Vietnamese bank, stock ticker CTG

=== Organizations ===
- CTG Collective, a not-for-profit art organization
- CTG Kurdistan, the primary investigative arm of the Kurdistan Regional Government
- Center for Technology in Government, a research institution of University at Albany, US
- Central Economic Society for the Grand Duchy of Poznań, a social-economic organization of Polish landowners
- Close the Gap, a social justice campaign in Australia
- Commerce & Trade Group, a branch of the Central Superior Services of Pakistan
- Counter Terrorism Group, a European intelligence sharing forum, offshoot of Club de Berne

== Science and technology ==
- Cardiotocography, a technique to record fetal heartbeat
- CTG, in the common genetic code a DNA triplet encoding leucine
- Cotangent (cot or ctg), a trigonometric function

== Other uses ==
- Chittagong, a city in Bangladesh commonly abbreviated Ctg
  - Chittagonian language, ISO 639-3 language code ctg
- Commander Task Group, designation of US Navy task groups including in United States Tenth Fleet
- Rafael Núñez International Airport, in Cartagena, Colombia, IATA airport code CTG
- Canadian Coast Guard, (ICAO airline designator) CTG

== See also ==
- Crypto: The Game, a browser game
