= Major Cities of Europe IT Users Group =

Major Cities of Europe
- Formation: 1982
- Type: Network of cities
- Location: Bremerhaven
- Region served: Europe
- Members: 40 member cities
- Official language: English
- President: Giorgio Prister
- Key people: CIO and IT Managers
- Website: www.majorcities.eu

The Major Cities of Europe IT Users Group is an independent association of chief information officers, IT managers and department heads of cities. The group was founded in 1982 as a result of an initiative by the Greater London Council. Since then it has focused on innovation in cities, driven by information and communications technology.

== City innovation and ICT ==
The mission of the group is to promote a voluntary exchange of ideas, strategies, visions and experiences between members to encourage innovation and improve the performance of local governments by using leading edge information and communication technology (ICT).

== Members ==
Members cover 17 countries and about 40 cities from Scandinavia, Western Eastern and Southern parts of Europe together with some non-European cities, such as Tel Aviv and Boston and other organisations and academia.

Country	Members
Austria	Vienna
Bosnia and Herzegovina	Banja Luka
Croatia	Opatija, Pula, Rijeka, Zagreb
France	Grand Lyon, Issy-les-Moulineaux
Germany	Berlin, Bremerhaven, Hamburg, Leipzig, Saarbrücken, VITAKO
Greece	Trikala
(Republic of Ireland) Ireland	Cork City Council, County Cork, Dublin, Fingal County, LGMA
Israel	Holon, Rishon LeZion, Tel Aviv
Italy	BAICR, Empoli, Florence, Genoa, Livorno, Modena, PIN Scrl (Prato), Prato, Rome, Trieste, Venice
Netherlands	Eindhoven, Zoetermeer
Romania	Bucharest
Celje, Slovenia	Koper, Ljubljana
Spain	Autonomous University of Barcelona, Barcelona
Sweden	Uppsala
Switzerland	Geneva, Zurich
United States	Boston, Center for Technology in Government (Albany)
United Kingdom	Aberdeen

== Sponsors ==
Global and national companies specialising in ICT technologies and solutions and developing innovation in cities support the initiatives of the association by sharing their experiences of deploying projects in each country and across the world.

== Collaboration with other organisations and academia ==
Partnerships are established with The Public Technology Institute from US and with VITAKO, the German association of ICT providers of local governments. Some universities are partnering with Major Cities of Europe thereby bringing the results of their research activities, for example Autonomous University of Barcelona and CTG – the Center for Technology in Government (Albany University – USA).

== Main activities ==
=== Annual conference ===
The annual conference provides the occasion for distinguished speakers from across Europe to present the latest ICT innovations in their cities and to share successes and challenges. In addition, informal exchanges, networking and discussions take place during the conference. In 2010 the conference was hosted by the city of Berlin, in 2011 by the city of Prato. The programs and handouts were published.

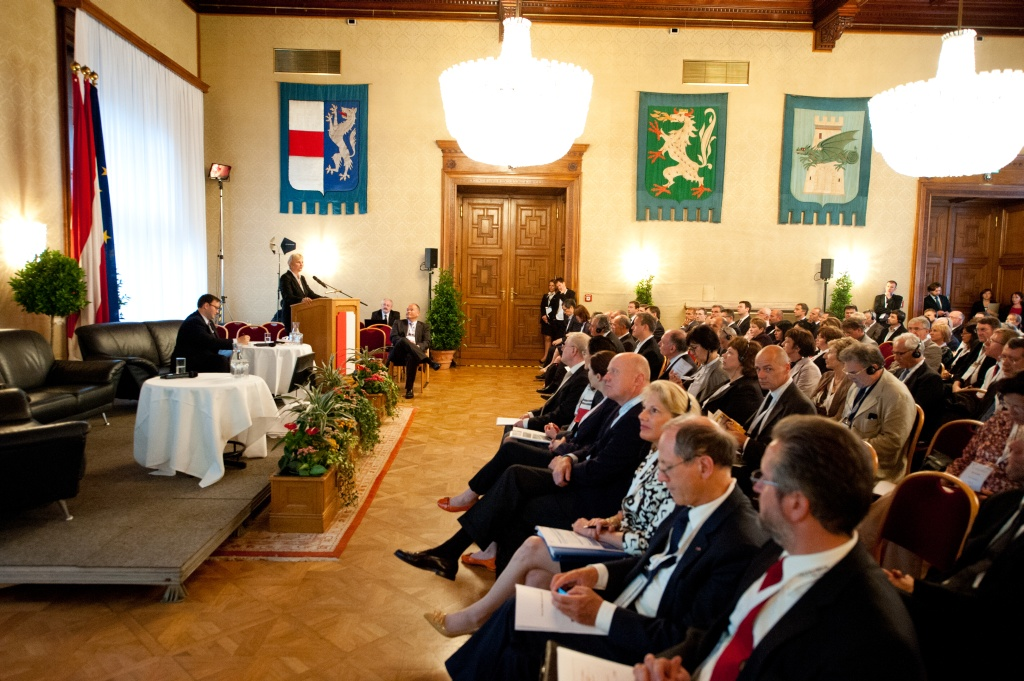
Major Cities Conference 2012 in Vienna

==== 2012 conference in Vienna ====
The 2012 conference in Vienna was attended by about 300 participants from all over Europe, US and Korea. Key topics of the 2012 conference

- Cities in the Open – Web 2.0, Open Data, E-participation
- Social Networks
- Mobile Government
- Cities in the Cloud
- Managing and Implementing ICT Innovation
- Cities in Practice

The programs, handouts and videos were published.

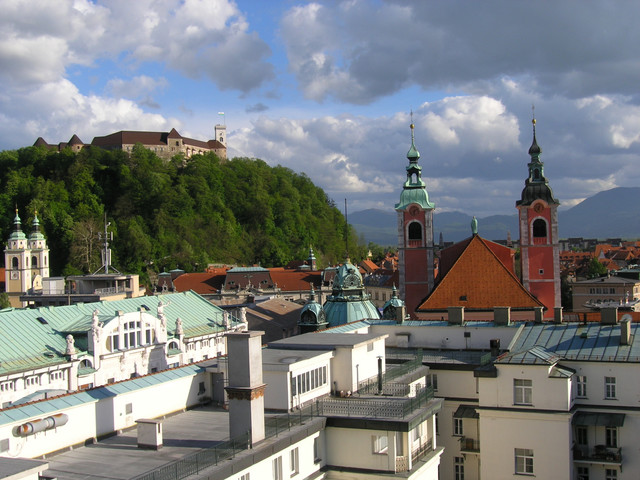
Major Cities Conference 2013 in Ljubljana

==== 2013 conference in Ljubljana ====
"ICT – fostering cities' prosperity" was the overarching theme of the conference, it was attended by about 180 participants. The need for radical transformation of cities is a key factor in responding to these challenges faced by the public sector. How can ICT help cities maintain their lead in providing services and in engaging with their citizens? How can the CIO evolve a management approach to be a leader in driving the city forward? Actual implementation experiences and key ideas will be presented during the conference to answer these questions. Key topics of the 2013 conference:

- Managing the ICT Center of today and tomorrow: how the job of the CIO is evolving
- Geographic information systems as a driver of city location-based services and as a unifying technology
- The City Protocol initiative: building together the cities of the 21st Century
- ICT revolution: new instruments for government services
- Big Data Management: extracting intelligence for new city initiatives
- Open Government, Open Data: experiences, solutions, rate of return, E-participation, social networks
- Outsourcing in cities: practical experiences and implementation of Cloud computing

The programs and handouts were published.

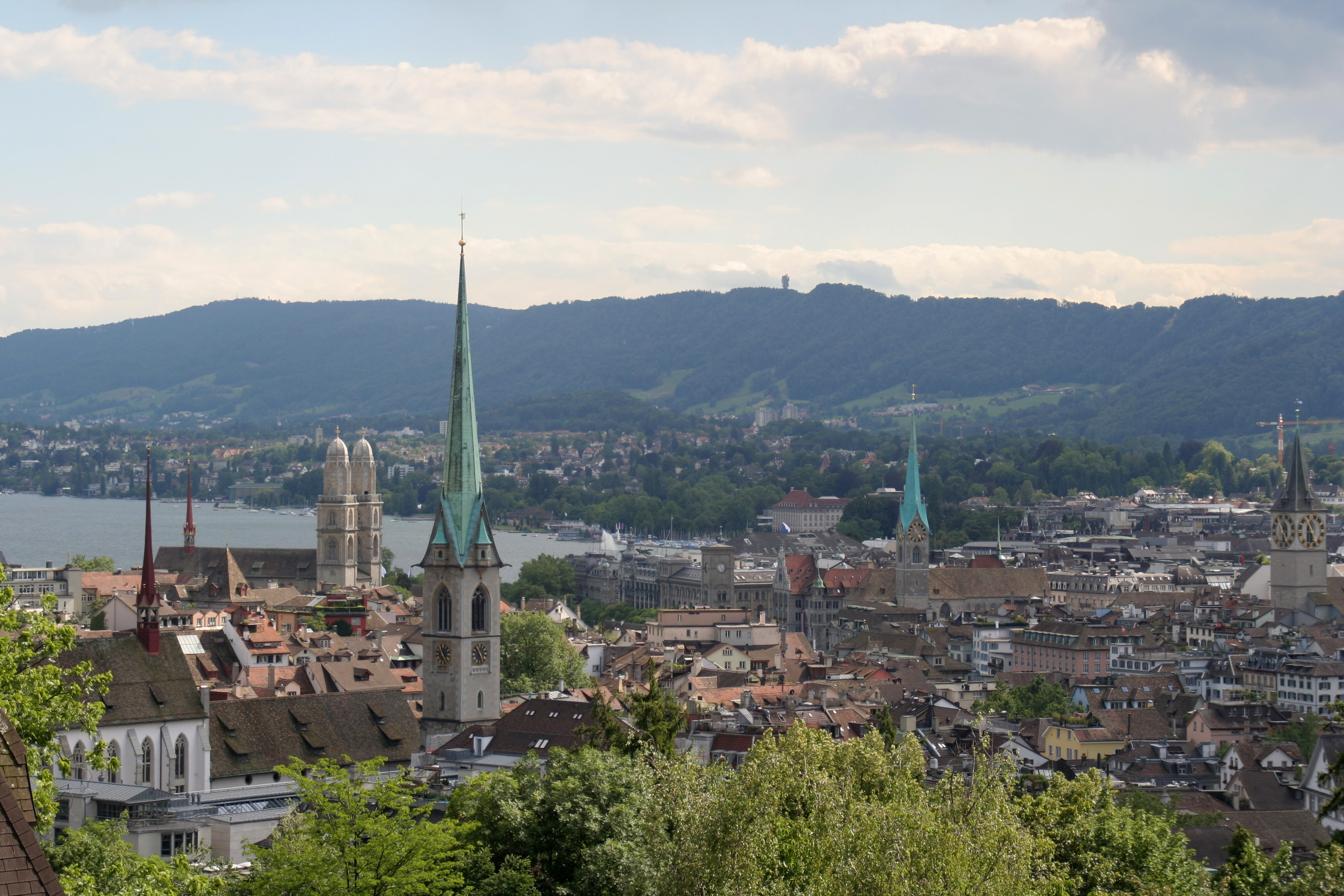
Major Cities Conference 2014 in Zürich

==== 2014 conference in Zurich ====
The 2014 conference in Zürich was attended by about 250 participants from 22 countries and 84 cities, the motto was: "Cities managing complexity in the digital world – prepared for the upcoming challenges?". Key topics of the 2014 conference:

- ICT, Politics and Citizens
- Cloud computing, shared services: Lessons learnt
- ICT and the pressure of Public finances
- Cyber Security

The programs and handouts were published.

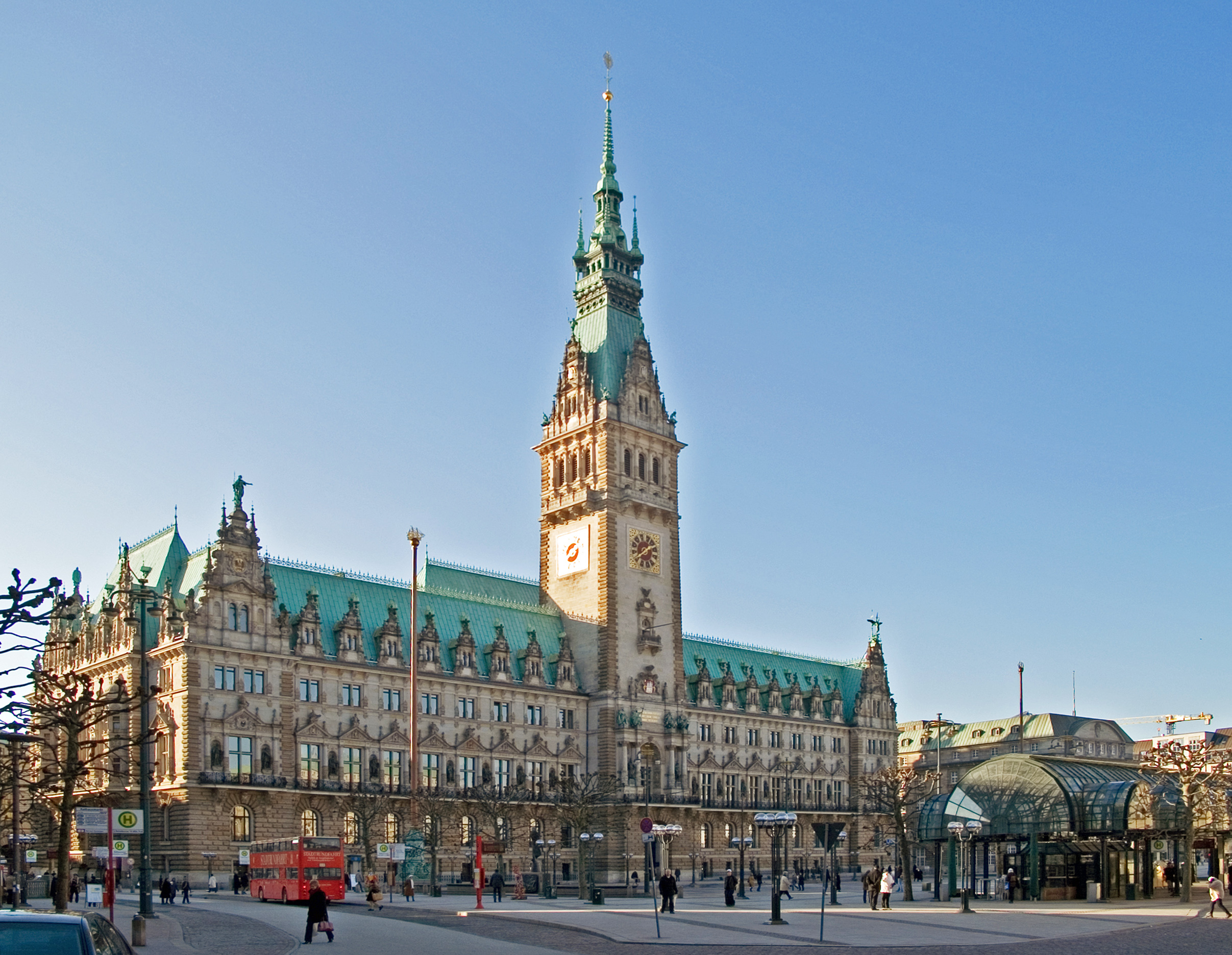
Major Cities Conference 2015 in Hamburg

==== 2015 conference in Hamburg ====
The 2015 conference in Hamburg was attended by 204 participants. The motto 2015 was: "Living, learning, leading in the connected city". Key topics of the 2015 conference:

- Rethinking e-government
- Governance of Smart Cites
- Openness, Transparency and the role of Social Media
- The School 2020
- The future workplace
- The city 2020

The program and handouts were published.

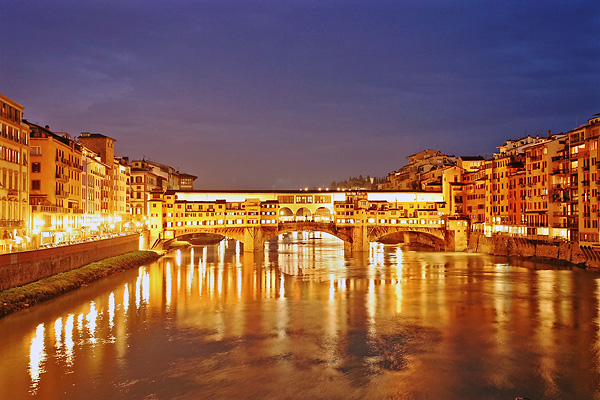
Major Cities Conference 2016 in Florence

==== 2016 conference in Florence ====
In 2016 the conference in the city of Florence was attended by about 400 delegates from all over Europe, the motto 2016 was: "City Renaissance in the Digital Age". Key topics of the 2016 conference:

- Citizens participation
- Government in the Cloud
- Internet of Things
- E-government & Digital transformation
- Safety & Security
- Smart Education
- eHealth / e-Care
- Tomorrow Is Only a Day Away

The program and handouts were published.

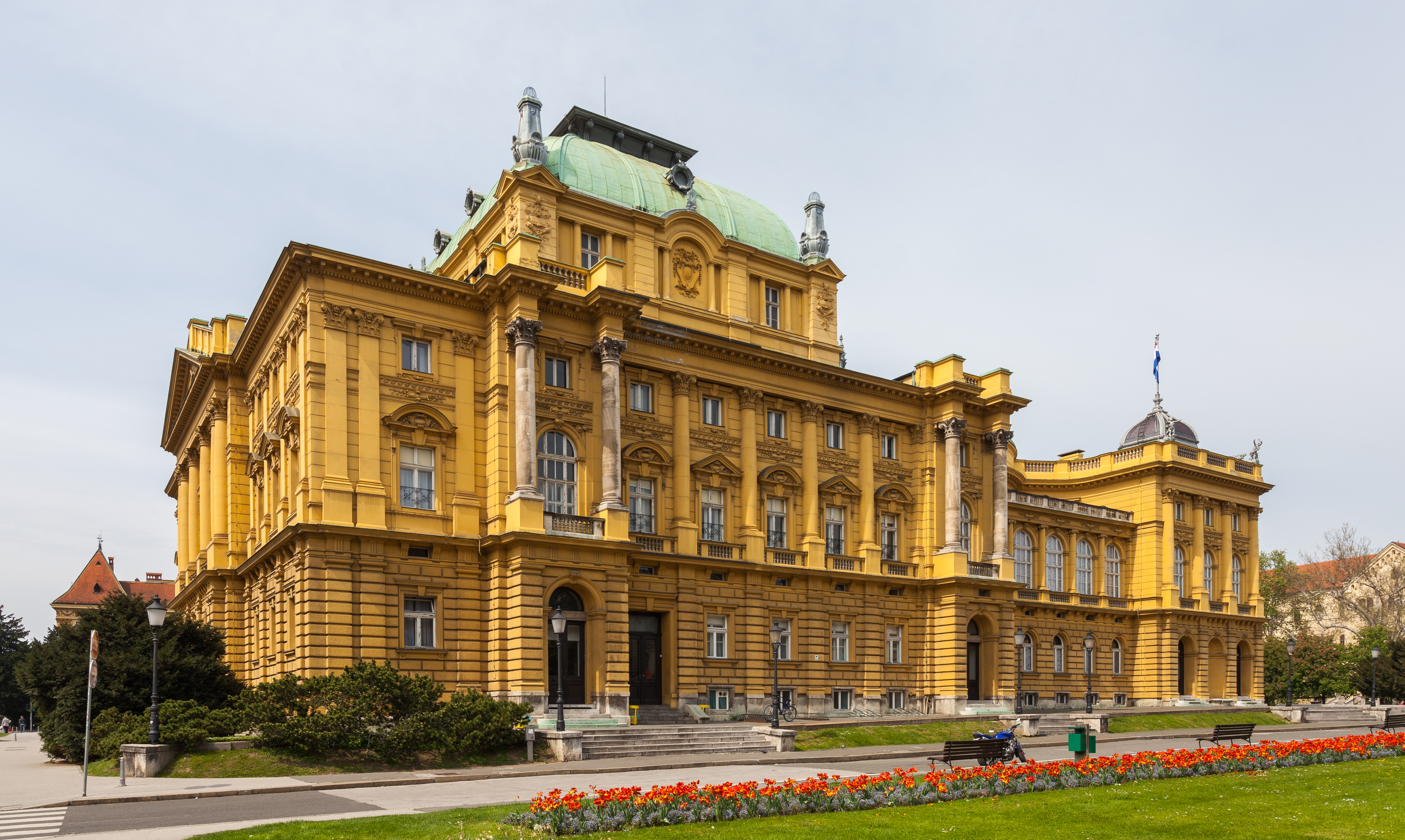
Major Cities Conference 2017 will take place in Zagreb

==== 2017 conference in Zagreb ====
In 2017 the conference will be hosted by the city of Zagreb from 12 to 14 June. The motto 2017 is: "The Digital Future – Cities Facing the Reality". Key topics of the 2017 conference will be:

- E-government initiatives – has the transformation of public services happened?
- The great vanishing act – public administration and the impact of emerging technologies
- Boosting the digital economy – the role of local public services
- Local democracy in a social media world
- Role of technology in assisting with the resilience
- Embedding and facilitating innovation in public services

=== Workshops ===
Member cities run workshops, usually lasting one day, to share and discuss experiences focusing on a specific topic of interest. The results of the workshops are published on the association's website.

Topics for workshops included:

- IT security for cities
- Big Data management
- ICT revolution vs. new instruments for Government services
- Geographic information system (GIS) as driver of city location based services
- IT and politics
- Managing and implementing ICT – new ICT roles
- The City Protocol Society
- Open Data
- Open Source Software

=== Participation in EU programs ===
The association makes it possible to take advantage of the experience of its members and of the value of the network of innovative cities to participate successfully in selected EU programs, such as FUPOL. Vitako and Major Cities of Europe organised the European Local Government Conference on ICT and the Local Government transformation in Europe in which the Smart Cities Project was presented.

=== Newsletter ===
The newsletter gives access to news about the association, about events and new emerging topics and technologies to support innovation.
