= Rodney Sacks =

South African businessman (born 1949/50)

- Born: 1949 or 1950 (age 76–77); South Africa
- Citizenship: South Africa, United States
- Education: University of the Witwatersrand
- Occupations: Chairman and CEO, Monster Beverage
- Relatives: Ze'ev Bielski (brother-in-law); Adi Bielski (niece); Leslie Sacks (brother)

Rodney Cyril Sacks (born 1949 or 1950) is a South African billionaire businessman, chairman, and former CEO of Monster Beverage since 1990.

== Early life ==
Rodney Cyril Sacks was born into a Lithuanian-Jewish family, he grew up in Johannesburg, South Africa. His brother was art collector Leslie Sacks. He was educated at University of the Witwatersrand in Johannesburg and graduated with a law degree as well as a postgraduate higher diploma in tax law.

== Career ==
Sacks worked as a lawyer in South Africa, and was the youngest person to be made a partner of Werksmans, the country's largest corporate law firm. In August 1989, Sacks emigrated to California with his family, having spent nearly 20 years with Werksmans and rising to become a senior partner.

In 1990, a consortium led by Sacks and his fellow South African, Hilton Schlosberg, acquired Hansen Natural Corporation, which in 1992 acquired Hansen's Natural Soda and Apple Juice for $14.5 million. Since 1990, Sacks has been chairman and CEO of Hansen Natural Corporation, which changed its name to Monster Beverage Corporation in 2012. In June 2025, Sacks and Schlosberg acquired Thrifty Ice Cream through their holding company Hilrod Holdings.

== Personal life ==
Sacks and his family emigrated from South Africa to California in 1989. His sister Caron Sacks is married to Israeli politician Ze'ev Bielski, and is the mother of actress Adi Bielski.
