= Leslie Sacks =

Art dealer

Leslie J. Sacks
- Born: 1952; Johannesburg, South Africa
- Died: September 26, 2013 (age 61); Los Angeles, United States
- Citizenship: South Africa - United States
- Education: University of the Witwatersrand
- Occupations: Art dealer and collector
- Spouse: Gina Brourman-Sacks
- Children: 4
- Family: Rodney Sacks (brother); Ze'ev Bielski (brother-in-law); Adi Bielski (niece)
- Website: http://womensvoicesnow.org http://www.lesliesacks.com

Leslie J. Sacks (1952 – September 26, 2013) was a Los Angeles–based art dealer and founder of Women's Voices Now.

== Early life ==
Sacks was born to a Jewish family in Johannesburg, South Africa, in 1952, the second of three children born to Lithuanian Jewish émigrés. His father was South African businessman Wolfe Harry Sacks. His sister Caron Sacks is married to Israeli politician Ze'ev Bielski, and is the mother of actress Adi Bielski. His brother Rodney Sacks is the co-founder of Monster Beverage.

Sacks graduated from the University of the Witwatersrand with a degree in psychology and computer science. While in college, he fought against apartheid.

== Career ==
In 1981, he opened his first art gallery, Les Art, in South Africa. In 1991, he moved to Los Angeles and opened Leslie Sacks Fine Art in Brentwood, California. In 2007, he purchased the Bobbie Greenfield Gallery at Bergamot Station, renaming it Leslie Sacks Contemporary. His specialities were African tribal art, post-war artists, and contemporary artists including Andy Warhol and Robert Motherwell. His collection of African art was published in Refined Eye, Passionate Heart - African Art from the Leslie Sacks Collection by Skira.

== Philanthropy ==
In 2010, Sacks founded and funded Women's Voices Now, a charity dedicated to "empowering women living in Muslim-majority societies by promoting their free expression, thereby giving voice to the struggles for civil, economic, political, and gender rights". He was an ardent supporter of the state of Israel. Sacks produced a documentary about his father, South Africa businessman Wolfe Harry Sacks.

== Personal life ==
Sacks died of cancer on September 26, 2013. He was survived by his wife Gina Brourman-Sacks, an immigrant from South Korea. He has two sons and two stepsons. His wife succeeded him as board chair of Women's Voices Now.
