= Thrifty Ice Cream =

American ice cream manufacturer

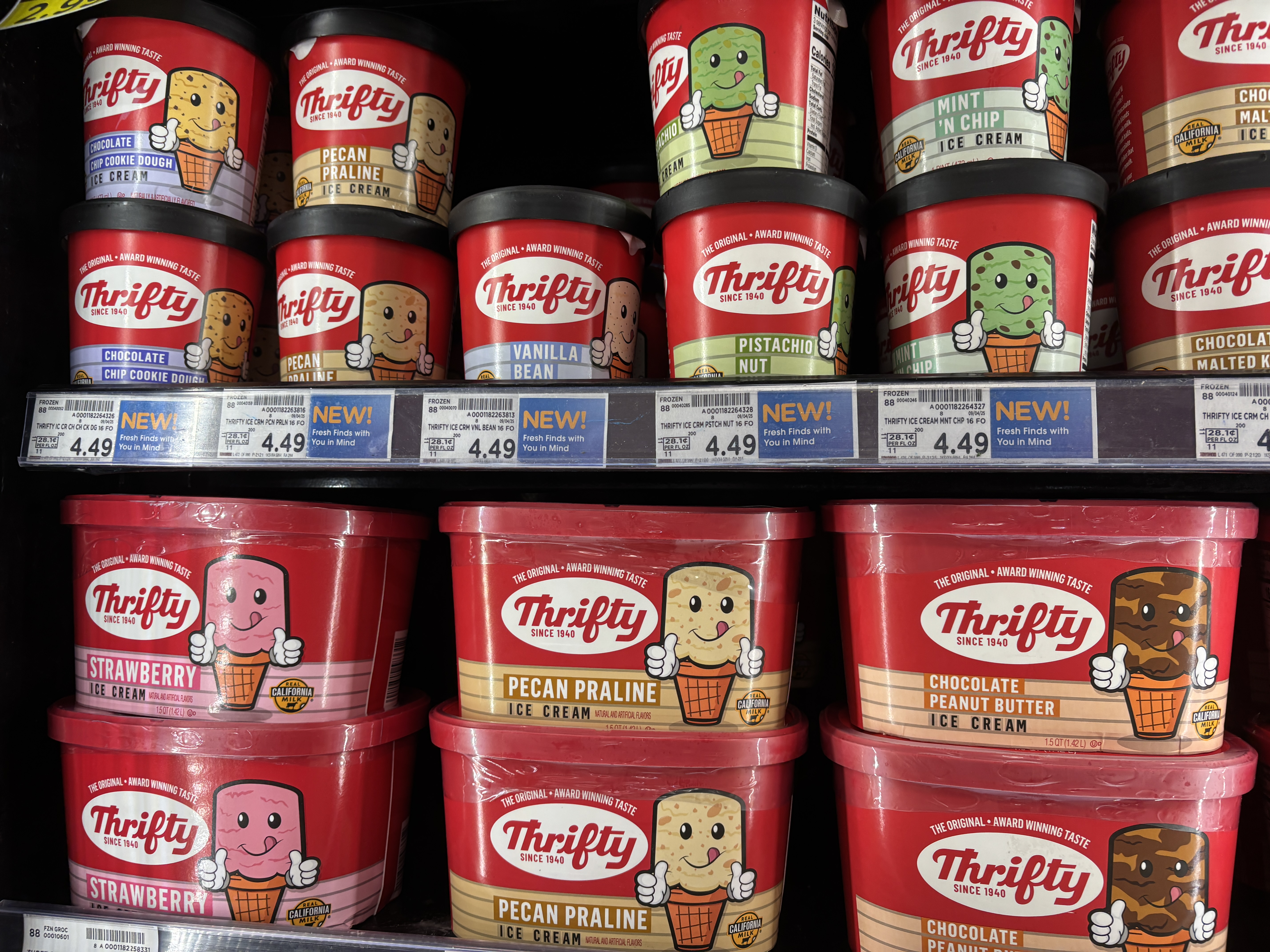
- Thrifty Ice Cream products sold at a Ralphs supermarket (2025)
- Type: Private
- Industry: Ice cream manufacturing and distribution
- Founded: 1940; 86 years ago in Hollywood, California
- Founders: Harry Borun; Robert Borun
- Headquarters: El Monte, California, US
- Areas served: United States; Mexico
- Key people: Hilton Schlosberg; Rodney Sacks; Dani Rothenberg
- Products: Ice cream
- Owner: Hilrod Holdings
- Website: thriftyicecream.com

Thrifty Ice Cream is an American company that manufactures ice cream, frozen yogurt, and sherbet.

Founded by Harry and Robert Borun, it was originally created in 1940 to produce a loss leader that was used to attract and encourage customers to linger inside a chain of Thrifty Drug Stores pharmacies throughout Southern California during the mid-twentieth century and purchase more drugstore goods.

It primarily distributes its ice cream in 1.5-quart (48 fl oz or 1.42 L) cartons through various supermarkets on the American West Coast such as Ralphs, Vons, Food 4 Less, Pavilions, Super King Markets, Safeway, Lucky California, Albertsons, and El Super. Three-gallon (384 fl oz or 11.36 L) tubs are available through warehouse stores such as Smart & Final.

It also distributed its products to various independent ice cream parlors in the American Southwest and northern Mexico. Previously, it was also present in over 500 Thrifty Ice Cream outlets located in Rite Aid pharmacies on the West Coast until the latter's bankruptcy and closure in 2025.

In July 2025, it was acquired by Hilrod Holdings, an investment group formed by executives who worked at Monster Energy. The following month, Hilrod announced plans of increasing distribution and the number of flavors offered.

== History ==
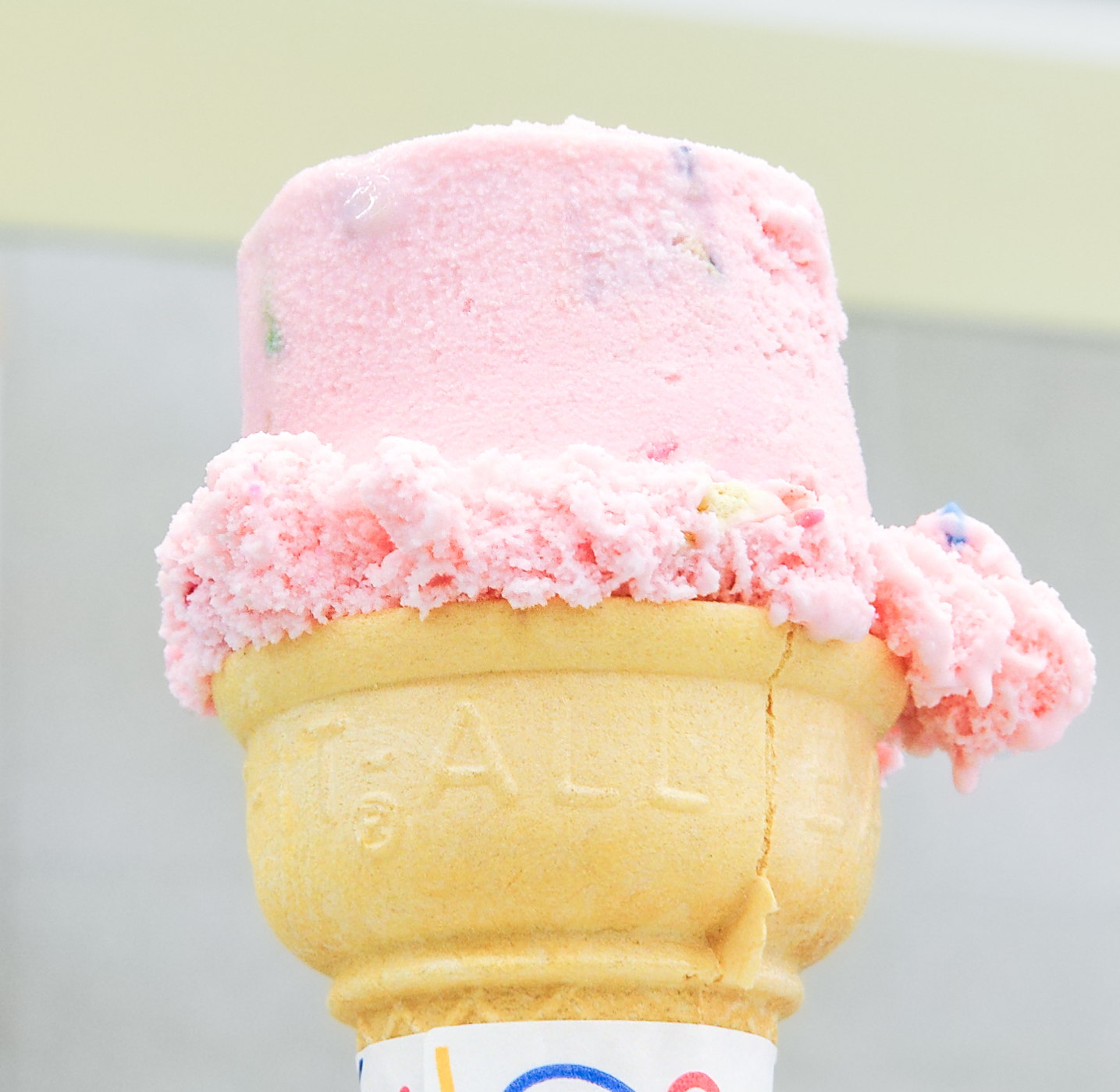
Single scoop of Circus Animal Cookies ice cream on a cake cone, showing the distinctive flat-topped, flat-sided shape of the scoop as typically served at Thrifty Ice Cream dispensaries

The Thrifty name and logo live on through Thrifty Ice Cream, sold in West Coast Rite Aid locations, at various ice cream shops in the southwestern United States and more than 200 in Mexico, and in some California supermarkets. Rite Aid preserved the Thrifty Ice Cream brand because it won numerous awards in its history, and remained well known for its affordable prices, quirky flavors, and iconic cylinder-shaped scoops. Popular Thrifty flavors include longtime hits Chocolate Malted Krunch, Butter Pecan, Medieval Madness, Mint 'N Chip, and Rocky Road, as well as more recent introductions such as Circus Animal Cookies, made with real Mother's Cookies.

Thrifty Ice Cream counters located within Rite Aid stores had sold hand-scooped ice cream in single-, double- or triple-scoop servings on sugar, cake, or waffle cones. In 2014, the ice cream was also sold pre-packaged in 1.75-quart (56 oz or 1.66 L) "sqrounder" cartons ("kind of square, kind of round") and 1-pint cartons. Thrifty traditionally sold packaged ice cream by the half gallon in simple, waxed-paper boxes formed by folding interlocking flaps; these distinctive brick-like boxes were phased out in early 2008.

=== Thrifty Drug Stores years ===
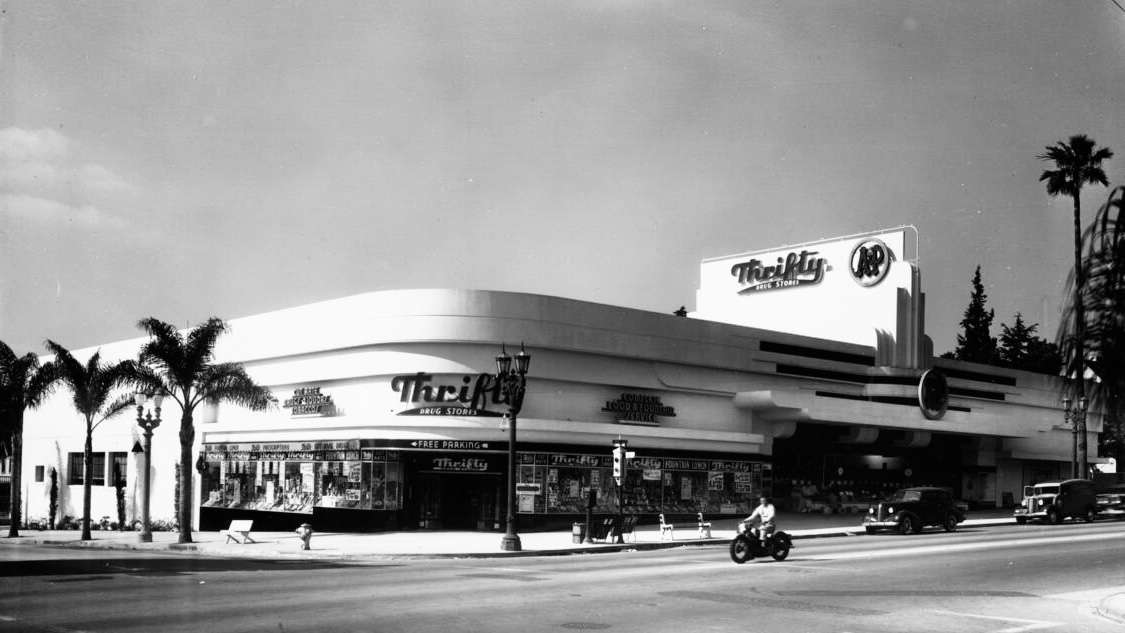
Thrifty Drug Store in Los Angeles, c. 1939 (California Historical Society via USC Libraries)

Like most early-twentieth-century drug stores featuring an in-store grill and soda fountain, Thrifty initially purchased ice cream from local suppliers. However, as Thrifty constantly opened new stores and expanded rapidly throughout Los Angeles, it became increasingly difficult to secure a steady supply of high-quality ice cream at a low price. To meet the demand created by their new stores, the Boruns decided in 1940 to produce their own ice cream by purchasing Borden Ice Cream Company's existing Hollywood factory for $250,000 (~$4.37 million in 2024).

Thrifty replaced the Hollywood plant in 1976 with a larger, 20,000-square-foot facility located on 3 acres in El Monte, California. Intended to supply the then-existing 450 Thrifty stores as well as outside purveyors, the new facility was initially capable of producing 16 million gallons of ice cream annually. In 2010, the plant produced ice cream for 599 Rite Aid stores across California, as well as wholesale customers such as Farrell's Ice Cream Parlour and Costco, which accounted for 40% of sales. The reborn Farrell's franchise tested a hundred brands before reselecting Thrifty as its supplier and winning the Orange County Register's 2010 Best Ice Cream contest. Thrifty makes its ice cream using a flash-freeze technique in the manufacturing process to minimize the size of ice crystals. The final product is frozen at −60 degrees for at least a day before leaving the factory.

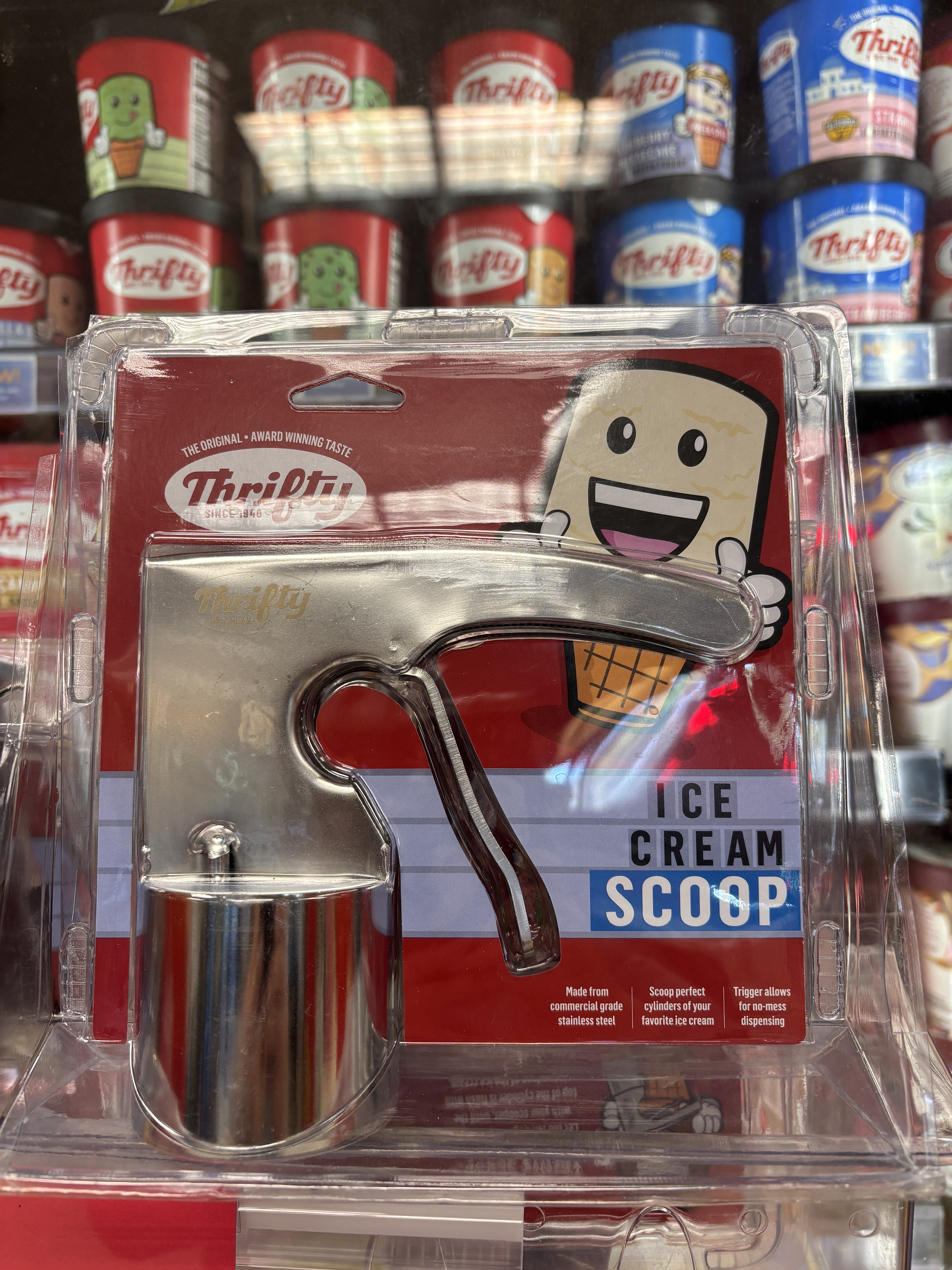
The device that gives the ice cream their unique shape when ice cream cones were purchased at the scoop counters inside of a Thrifty Drug Store.

Thrifty ice cream has won numerous gold medals at the Los Angeles County Fair and California State Fair since 1948. Reporting on Thrifty's thirteenth consecutive gold at both fairs in 1961, the Torrance Herald explained that ice cream at these "two widely acclaimed competitions" is judged on flavor, body, texture, sanitation, color, and packaging. Thrifty has won gold medals at the L.A. County Fair every year since 1952. In 1988, Thrifty ice cream received a total of 24 gold medals at the L.A. County Fair, more than any other competitor.

Many recipes have remained unchanged for over 50 years, and real pieces of fruit and cookie are used along with Real California Milk. Thrifty ice cream contains 10.25% butterfat, compared to 12–16% butterfat in premium rivals costing twice as much. As recently as 1974, a single scoop could be purchased for just a nickel. The price increased to $0.10 by 1976, to $0.15 by 1981, to $0.35 by 1991, to $1.29 by 2010, to $1.69 by 2011, to $1.79 by 2013, to $1.99 by 2018, to $2.49 by 2023, and finally to $2.79 when Rite Aid folded in 2025.

For many decades, Thrifty Drug Stores was using the extremely low price that it was charging customers for a single scoop of ice cream that was usually eaten inside the store as a loss leader to entice those customers to bring their entire families into the store on a regular basis to eat ice cream that was sold at or below cost while those same customers browse the aisle (while eating) and usually find other items to purchase before leaving the store.

Unlike other ice cream shops, the Thrifty Drug Stores (and later Rite Aid) scoop shops had always used an iconic ice cream scoop that produced flat-top cylindrical scoops (see above photograph). The scoops were not sold to the general public until 2019. A writer for Food & Wine wrote that the unique scoop "is the last ice cream scoop you'll ever buy."

Thrifty achieved Kosher certification for its ice cream products in 1994.

=== Rite Aid era ===
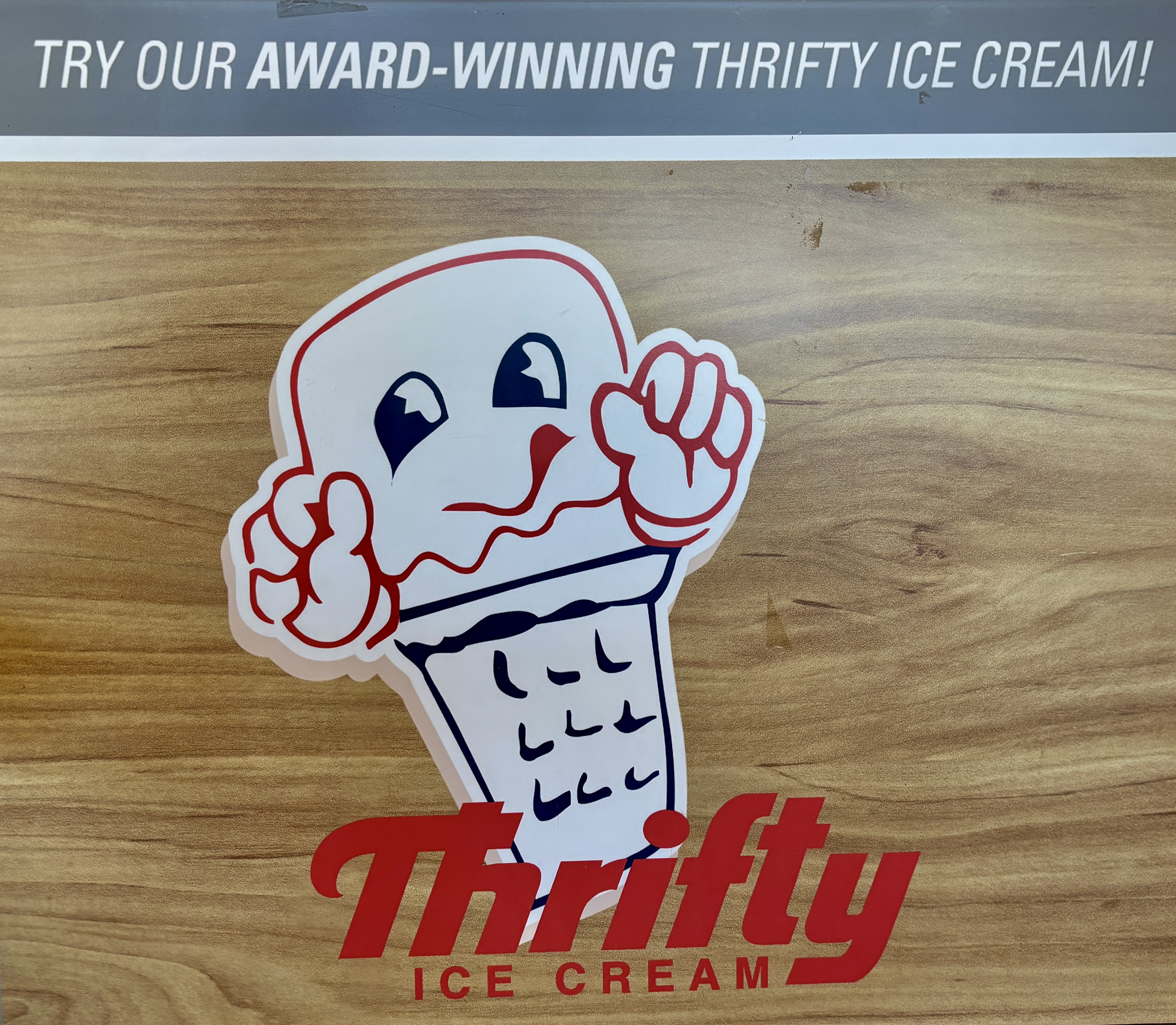
Thrifty Ice Cream logo at a closed Rite-Aid ice cream counter (2025)

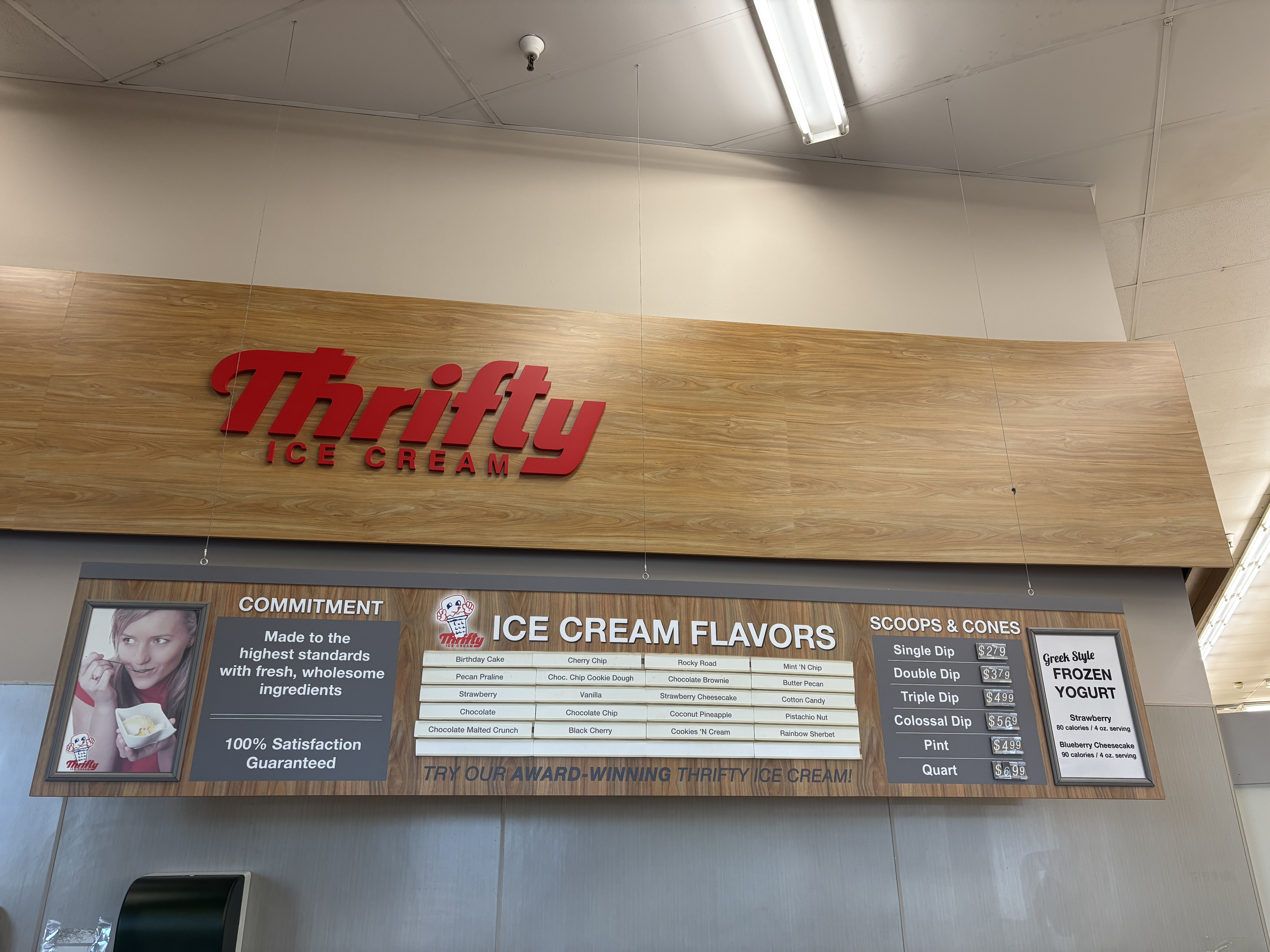
Thrifty Ice Cream counter at Rite-Aid (2025)

In late 1996, Thrifty Drug Stores and its parent company Thrifty PayLess were sold to Rite Aid for $1.3 billion. Rite Aid kept the ice cream scoop shops in existing stores on the West Coast but did not expand the Thrifty brand to the rest of the Rite Aid chain with the exception of a limited variety of prepackaged 56 oz. containers. Rite Aid incurred heavy debt and became a takeover target during the mid-2010s.

In October 2015, Walgreens announced that it would acquire Rite Aid, but said that it had not yet made a decision whether it would continue to carry any product line that was sold by Rite Aid that was not being distributed by Walgreens. Thrifty Ice Cream customers were concerned that Walgreens would discontinue carrying their beloved ice cream.

After the Walgreens deal was not approved by regulators, it was announced in February 2018 that Albertsons and Rite Aid would merge.

In May 2018, Albertsons announced that it had plans to sell the Thrifty branded ice cream at its groceries stores (such as Vons and Safeway), but the announcement left many questions unanswered, such as whether it would retain the in-store scoop shops, the El Monte manufacturing facility, and the ice cream recipes. Some Thrifty Ice Cream customers were concerned that Albertsons may sell the plant and that the "new" Thrifty Ice Cream would be identical to the Lucerne and Signature Select store brands but packaged in a different box. In August 2018, Rite Aid announced that it had called off the merger with Albertsons and would remain independent for the moment.

In May 2019, Rite Aid announced that it had expanded the distribution of prepackaged 48-ounce containers of Thrifty branded ice cream in up to eight out of 23 available flavors to Rite Aid stores in Idaho, Oregon and Washington. At the time of the announcement, there were no plans to sell ice cream by the scoop at those new stores outside of California. Two months later, Rite Aid announced that they plan to expand the distribution of Thrifty Ice Cream in 48-ounce pre-packaged containers to select Rite Aid stores in Delaware, Maryland, New Jersey, New York and Pennsylvania on a trial basis starting in July.

=== Demise of Rite Aid ===
In October 2023, Rite Aid filed for Chapter 11 bankruptcy, resulting in the closure of 31 Rite Aid locations in California that had Thrifty Ice Cream scoop counters. After filing for bankruptcy a second time in May 2025, Rite Aid announced plans to close all of their stores with scoop shops within their former Thrifty Drug Stores territory while auctioning off the Thrifty Ice Cream El Monte factory, the Thrifty brand, plus related intellectual property in a June 20 auction. Thrifty Ice Cream was listed as a voluntary asset in Rite Aid's 2025 Chapter 11 filing. Hilrod Holdings, the owners of Monster Energy, was named the successful bidder for Thrifty and the transaction was approved by a New Jersey bankruptcy judge on July 1.

=== Distribution outside of Rite Aid ===
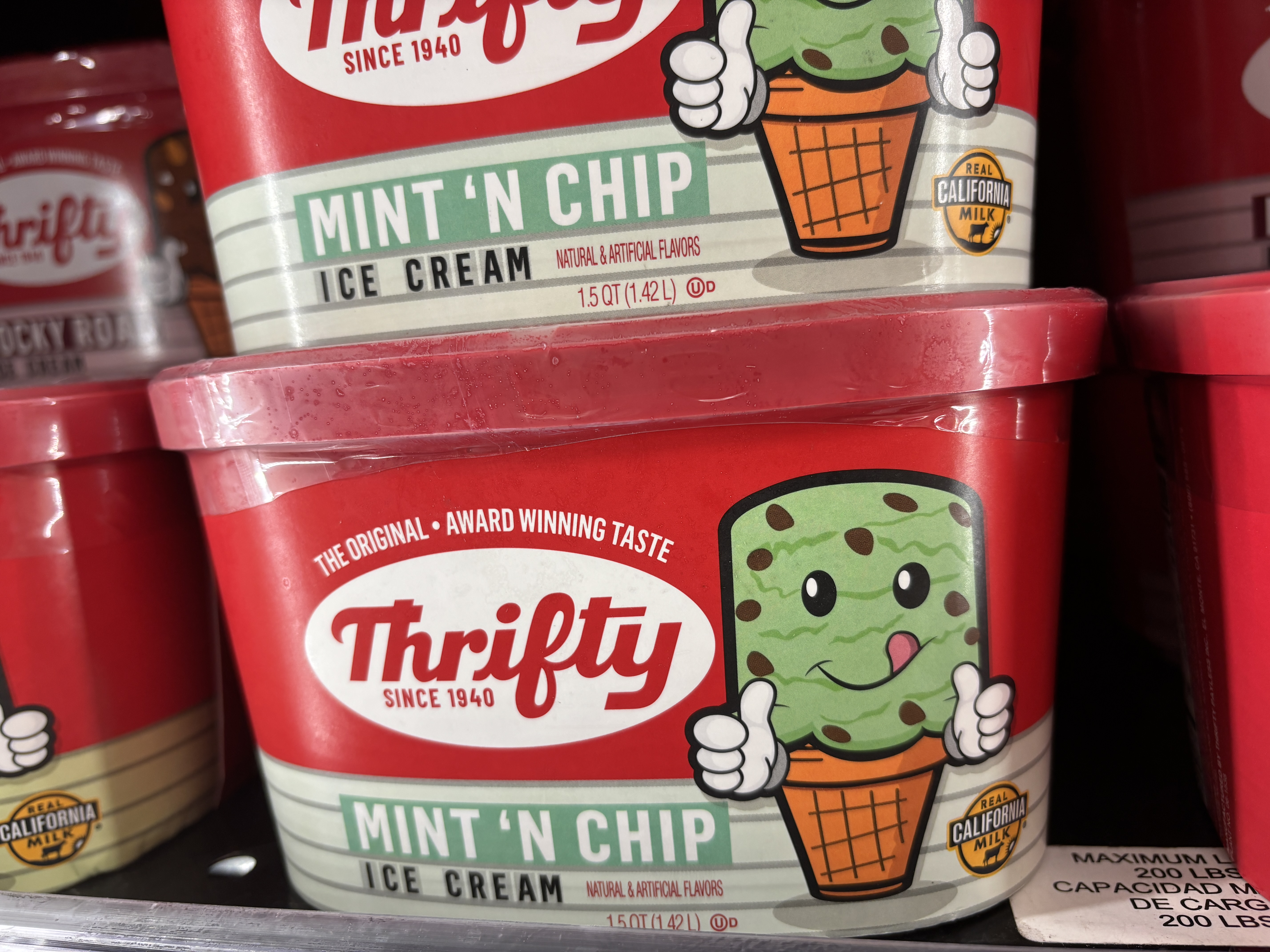
Thrifty Ice Cream products sold at a Ralphs supermarket in Los Angeles County, California (2025)

During the Rite Aid era, Bon Suisse, a Poway, California–based company, had held an exclusive license since 1995 from Rite Aid to use the Thrifty brand name and to distribute Thrifty ice cream within the Southwestern United States and Mexico plus additional rights to extend sales within Latin America and the Middle East. In May 2018, Bon Suisse bought close to 800,000 gallons of Thrifty ice cream a year for redistribution through restaurants, hotels, ice cream dipping stations, grocery stores and a few prisons located in California, Arizona, Nevada and Mexico. It is not clear how exclusive Bon Suise's distribution license would remain under Hilrod.

Thrifty Ice Cream teamed up with Chuck E. Cheese to launch a cross-promotional birthday cake ice cream flavor in the fall of 2024 that was sold exclusively at 350 Rite Aid retail pharmacies in California and 34 Chuck E. Cheese fun centers in Southern California. Each container included 500 free e-tickets that were redeemable at participating Chuck E. Cheese fun centers.

=== New life under Hilrod ===
In August 2025, Hilrod announced plans to revive Thrifty Ice Cream by updating packaging, adding new flavors, and adding wider distribution. Later the same month, Thrifty began 48-oz carton distribution through a Denver metropolitan area supermarket chain, King Soopers. In February 2026, Thrifty began distribution through WinCo Foods supermarket chain in selected states.

== Mexico ==
In May 2014, Helados Thrifty, the licensed purveyor in Mexico, had 184 scoop shop locations in the northern and central Mexican states of Baja California, Baja California Sur, Sonora, Sinaloa, Jalisco, Colima, Nayarit, and the State of Mexico. There are plans to expand throughout Mexico via the sale of additional franchises. All Thrifty ice cream sold in Mexico is produced by the El Monte, California, plant.

== Gold medals ==
At the 1949 Los Angeles County Fair, Thrifty was awarded a gold medal for its catering chocolate ice cream.

At the 2024 Los Angeles International Dairy Competition, Thrifty's Chocolate Chip Ice Cream was awarded a gold medal in the Cow Milk Frozen Dairy Desert category.
