= Sophia Wallace =

American conceptual artist and photographer

- Born: 1978; Seattle, Washington US
- Education: Smith College; New York University; International Center of Photography
- Style: Conceptual artist Photographer
- Website: sophiawallace.com

Sophia Wallace (born 1978) is an American conceptual artist and photographer. She is best known for her project "CLITERACY," which addresses citizenship and body sovereignty through the medium of text-based objects, unauthorized street installation, performance and sculptural forms.

== Early life ==
Wallace was born in Seattle, Washington. She holds a BA in Government/Political Science from Smith College and a Master of Arts in Photography from New York University and the International Center of Photography. In 1998, Wallace did coursework in a study abroad program in Political Theory at the University of Ghana.

== Career ==
=== Conceptual framework ===
Wallace incorporates the use of images, video, and mixed media in her work in an effort to explore alterity, the study of otherness and the focus on dismantling the concept of sameness. Wallace’s focus is to deconstruct how this concept of the other is represented within a visual framework. She examines how the visual affects gender and sexuality. The focus is on the idea of what she calls the "racialized body." Wallace is trying to explore in her work the relinquishment of gender norms and stereotypes—through images she examines and moves these issue to the forefront looking at the norms of gender.

==== Modern Dandy ====
In 2011, Wallace worked in the mediums of photography and portraiture in order to examine assumptions about gender, race, and heteronormativity. She photographed professional male models who were what she called "living representations of idealized masculinity" and examine the male models in a comparative way that women are traditionally photographed. It is an examination of what is typically viewed as a passive view of women through a photographic view. Exploring the origin of the concept of dandy from the 19th century thinkers Oscar Wilde and Charles Baudelaire, the works call into question gender norms.

Installation view of Άδάμας (Unconquerable), 2013, by Sophia Wallace

==== CLITERACY ====
In 2012, Wallace has received international critical acclaim and viral exposure for CLITERACY: 100 NATURAL LAWS. The project aims to "dismantle the taboos associated with female and feminized genitals." Using text as form, CLITERACY "explores the construction of female sexual bodies as passive vehicles of reception defined by lack. It confronts a false body of knowledge by scientists who have resisted the idea of a unique, autonomous female body and rather studied what confirmed their assumption that women’s anatomy was the inverse of male anatomy, and that reproduction was worthy of study, while female sexuality was most certainly not."

Wallace has also created sculptural forms such as Άδάμας (unconquerable)', the first anatomically correct sculpture of the clitoris, and Invisible Sculpture, which "addresses negation and omnipresence by denying access to the form while reinforcing its presence."

=== Exhibitions ===
Wallace has presented her work in exhibitions in the U.S. and abroad, including Kunsthalle Wien Museum, Art Basel Miami, Scope NY, Taschen Gallery and Aperture Gallery among others. She has had solo exhibitions at Leslie-Lohman Museum of Gay and Lesbian Art, Newspace Center of Photography, Samek Art Museum, Definitely Superior Gallery, and Catinca Tabacaru Gallery.

== Personal life ==
Wallace lives in Brooklyn, New York.

== Works and publications ==
Exhibition catalog

- Walkner, Martin, Gerald Matt, Eugenio Viola, and Peter Weiermair. No Fashion, Please!: Fotografie Zwischen Gender Und Lifestyle = Photography between Gender and Lifestyle. Wien: Kunsthalle Vien, 2011. ISBN 978-3-86984-269-1
