= The Veteran (2011 film) =

- Directed by: Matthew Hope
- Screenplay by: Matthew Hope; Robert Henry Craft
- Story by: Matthew Hope
- Produced by: Debbie Shuter; Kim Leggatt
- Starring: Toby Kebbell; Brian Cox; Adi Bielski
- Cinematography: Philipp Blaubach
- Edited by: Emma Gaffney
- Music by: Mark Delany
- Production companies: DMK Productions; Insight Films
- Distributed by: Revolver Entertainment
- Release date: 29 April 2011
- Running time: 98 minutes
- Countries: United Kingdom; United States
- Language: English
- Budget: £2 million

The Veteran is a 2011 British-American action film directed by Matthew Hope and starring Toby Kebbell, Brian Cox, Tony Curran and Adi Bielski.

== Plot ==
Robert Miller, a veteran paratrooper, is returning from the war in Afghanistan to his home in a violent decaying South London Heygate Estate, overrun by gun-toting youth gangs. The gangs are led by a drug lord gangster Jones who is interested in Miller working for him, but his job offer is rejected.

Through an ex-army mate, Miller finds work in undercover surveillance. He is soon recruited by a couple of shady government operatives for an undercover operation to keep tabs on a network of suspected terrorist cells. Embedded in the terrorist group is a Lebanese-born British citizen informant.

Miller soon discovers that the security forces and the intelligence services are not quite what they seem. He uncovers a conspiracy the government is planning to set off a series of coordinated attacks to renew fear of terrorism to help them benefit from the GOD policy - Guns, Oil, and Drugs. Miller finds out that all his surveillance was simply to confirm the go-ahead for the attacks. The government needs funding and the GOD policy has been instated for years. Miller finds out that this links with the local gang terrorising his neighbourhood being linked with the terrorist cells.

Miller attacks and kills most of Jones' men, but also accidentally shoots an innocent woman. He ends up being shot dead by a young kid that Miller had previously been trying to get out of Jones' gang.

== Cast ==
- Toby Kebbell as Robert Miller
- Brian Cox as Gerry
- Tony Curran as Chris Turner
- Adi Bielski as Alayna Wallace
- Tom Brooke as Danny Turner
- Selva Rasalingam as Fawwaz
- Ashley Bashy Thomas as Tyrone Jones
- Mem Ferda as Hakeem
- Ivanno Jeremiah as Fahad Sahal
- Eboseta Ayemere as Ryan Sahal

== Production ==
The movie was primarily shot in various locations in London, England. Some scenes were also filmed in the Canary Wharf area and at the O2 Arena.

== Reception ==
The film received mixed reviews from critics, who generally praised Toby Kebbell's lead performance but criticized the script and the ending. On Rotten Tomatoes, the film holds an approval rating of 60% based on 20 reviews, with an average rating of 5.2/10.

Trevor Johnston of Time Out gave the film 3 out of 5 stars, describing Kebbell's performance as "mesmerising" and comparing the film's paranoia to Taxi Driver, though he noted it "lacks the thematic substance to go with it." Philip French of The Guardian praised Kebbell's "impressive performance" in what he called an "efficient, familiar urban thriller." Conversely, Phelim O'Neill, also writing for The Guardian, gave the film 2 out of 5 stars, criticizing it as a "thinly populated drama, full of sketchy, unconvincing characters" with a "preposterous" finale. Tim Robey of The Daily Telegraph similarly felt that while the final shootout was engaging, the "fumbled ironies of the plot leave a dour and portentous aftertaste."
