= Catinca Tabacaru Gallery =

New York City art gallery

Coordinates: 40.718158°N 73.989771°W

Catinca Tabacaru Gallery is a contemporary art gallery in New York City opened in May 2014. Catinca Tabacaru Gallery, Harare, the Gallery's second location was founded in August 2017 in partnership with Dzimbanhete Arts Interactions.

== History ==
The gallery was founded by Catinca Tabacaru, a Romanian-born art dealer and curator, who worked as a litigation attorney and executive director of Women's Voices Now, in 2014 on the Lower East Side of Manhattan. Tabacaru also co-founded and served as the executive director of Women's Voices Now, an organization that encourages women's filmmaking in Muslim-majority communities. In 2012, she stepped down from Women's Voices Now to focus primarily on her art career, and opened her first physical space for the Catinca Tabacaru Gallery in 2014. One year later she co-founded the CTG Collective, and subsequently CTG(R), a traveling art residency program affiliated with the gallery with its inaugural installment taking place in Zimbabwe. She curated her first institutional exhibition at the National Gallery of Zimbabwe in 2015. In 2020, the gallery exhibition space moved from NYC to Bucharest, Romania, Catinca’s home town.

== Exhibitions ==
=== Solo exhibitions ===
- Gail Stoicheff: Little Miss Strange
- Yapci Ramos: Red-Hot
- Shinji Murakami: Lateral Thinking with Withered Technology
- Terrence Musekiwa: Standing on a line, not being on either side
- Joe Brittain: Past Tense
- Capucine Gros: Implicit Borders: a cartography of free will
- Mehryl Levisse: Birds of a feather fly together
- Admire Kamudzengerere: I am gonna...you. Till you run.
- Xavier Robles de Medina: if you dream of your tongue, beware
- Serra Victoria Bothwell Fels: a DEFECT // to DEFECT
- Greg Haberny: Py•r•o·glyph•s
- Justin Orvis Steimer: cave paintings of a homo galactian
- Sophia Wallace: OVER AND OVER AND OVER
- Radouan Zeghidour: HYPOGEA
- Jasmin Charles: Charly & Chill
- Shinji Murakami, Solo exhibition
- Greg Haberny: Domestic
- Justin Orvis Steimer: have you ever wondered what a soul looks like?
- Joe Brittain: Intercourse
- Gail Stoicheff: Distressed Blonde
- Rachel Monosov: Effects of Displacement
- Tamara Mendels: Flow
- Addam Yekutieli (aka Know Hope): EMPATHY
- Yapci Ramos: Perras y Putas

=== Group exhibitions ===
- 1972: Rachel Monosov and Admire Kamudzengerere
- THE GUARDIAN AND THE BUILDER: Terrence Musekiwa, Justin Orvis Steimer
- TERRA NOVA: Rachel Monosov, Terrence Musekiwa, Yapci Ramos, Justin Orvis Steimer
- FRAGMENTED TIME: Ella Littwiz, Rachel Monosov, Benjamin Verhoeven, Reijiro Wada
- Zig Zag Zim Part II: Admire Kamudzengerere, Rachel Monosov, Terrence Musekiwa, Xavier Robles de Medina and Justin Orvis Steimer
- Zig Zag Zim Part I: Virginia Chihota, Admire Kamudzengerere, Rachel Monosov, Terrence Musekiwa and Justin Orvis Steimer
- Devotion: Mike Ballou, Joe Brittain, William Corwin, Serra Victoria Bothwell Fels, Elizabeth Ferry, Rico Gatson, Elisabeth Kley, Rachel Monosov, Roxy Paine, Joyce Pensato, Katie Bond Pretti, Carin Riley, Paul Anthony Smith, Justin Orvis Steimer, Gail Stoicheff, and Sophia Wallace.
- Material Myth: Tracey Emin, Caroline Wells Chandler, Meg Lipke, Rachael Gorchov, Roxanne Jackson and Robin Kang
- Fictions and Constructions: Rui Chafes, Felix R. Cid, and Xavier Robles de Medina
- Robin Kang & Duhirwe Rushemeza: Danger is in the Neatness of Identification
- Make it Big, Make it Red, Put a Crown on It: Doo-Jin Ahn, Jasmin Charles, Christian Dore, Barnaby Furnas, Peter Kappa, Brian Leo, Greg Haberny & Andrew Smenos
- It Begins on Paper: Patricia Cronin, Greg Haberny, Rachel Monosov, Xavier Robles de Medina, Justin Orvis Steimer, Gail Stoicheff & Sophia Wallace
