= Women's Voices Now =

Women's Voices Now (WVN) is an American non-profit organization that "uses film to drive positive social change that advances girls' and women's rights globally". It organizes online short film festivals and other activities in its mission to "amplif[y] the voices of all women by promoting the free expression of women's struggles for civil, economic, political, and gender rights worldwide". In addition to its festivals, WVN expanded to include an archive of films, a publication, educational programs, screenings, workshops and training, as well as providing scholarships. The organization was founded in 2010 by lawyer Catinca Tabacaru and philanthropist Leslie Sacks.

== Festival history ==
The organization was founded in 2010, and its first film festival was held in 2011. Every festival has a theme; the first festival's theme was Women's Voices from the Muslim World: A Short Film Festival. The festival had over 200 films submitted from over 40 countries showcasing what life is like for women in the Muslim world. The 2014 festival's theme was Women Bought and Sold: Voices United Against Violence. The third, fourth and fifth festivals were held in 2016, 2017 and 2018 respectively, with both the fifth and sixth occurring in 2019. Each film festival had winners for six main categories. The categories are the Leslie Sacks Grand Prize for best overall film; Best Documentary Feature; Best Documentary Short; Best Narrative Short; Best Experimental Film; and Audience Choice for the last four categories. The prizes for some of the categories include: $3,000 for the Leslie Sacks Grand Prize, $2,000 for the winner in the Best Documentary Feature category, and $1,000 each for the winners in the Best Documentary Short and Best Experimental Film categories. The winners receive their prize once they deliver their acceptance speech to Women's Voice Now.

The festival participants agree to participate in the online festival, and submit the final cut without any advertisements (with subtitles if required, since the Festival's official language is English). The upload and submission must include a high-resolution digital copy of the film, along with three stills, a poster, and a trailer if the film has one. If the participant wins, they must allow their film to be screened at the festival's closing event, and allow it to be available on the website. The films must be about women (including trans women) and the issues they face in society today. To be eligible, the filmmakers must guarantee the film is entirely their content, and those in the film must all have consented to be filmed. The films vary in length as there is no time constraint.

== Other programming ==
In addition to the yearly film festival, Women's Voice Now also hosts an online archive of the festivals' films, as well as an online publication called The WVoice. Like the film festival, The WVoice focuses on international women's rights and voices. It publishes written, audio, and visual bodies of work that document women's stories and issues that educate and foster cultural difference and connections, and promotes and advocates for women's rights. The generally brief entries include essays, interviews, prose, short fiction, poetry, photo essays, and video essays under five minutes in length. Women's Voice Now also runs workshops and training programs on what they do with their film festivals and how they support women's rights advocacy.

Women's Voices Now also runs a youth development program, Girls' Voices Now.

== 2011 film festival winners ==
Category	Title	Director	Country of origin	Year Made
Documentary	Half Value Life	Alka Sadat	Afghanistan	2009
	Breaking the Silence	Ammar Basha	Yemen	2009
	Thorns and Silk	Paulina Tervo	West Bank	2009
Narrative	Again Life	Hassan Fazeli	Afghanistan	2009
	Francais Langue Etrangere	Kartik Singh	France	2009
	Sunglasses	Mustafa Kia	Afghanistan	2009
Experimental	Basita	Laila Hotait	Lebanon	2010
	It is Written	Mostafa Heravi	Netherlands	2006
	1700% Project: Mistaken for Muslim	Anida Yoeu Ali	USA	2010
Student Film	Jazbaa: A Strong Will	Rama Barhat	India	2010
	Male and Female	Ahmed Adel	Egypt	2010
	The Unveiled	Ola Diab and Shereena Qazi	Qatar	2009

== 2014 film festival winners ==
Category	Title	Director	Country of origin	Year Made
Documentary	Breaking the Silence: Moroccans Speak Out!	GlobalGirl Media	Morocco	2013
	Mohtarama	N/A	N/A	N/A
	In the Name of Tradition	May El Hossamy	Egypt	2013
Narrative	Swap	Sayed Masoud Islami	Afghanistan	2013
	Aabida	Maaria Syed	India	2013
	The Virginity Minarets	Farhad Rezaee	Afghanistan	2013
Experimental	Take Care	Afrooz Nasersharif	Iran	2013
	Get Along	Parya Vatankhah	Iran	2013
	The Reflex	Ali Mousavi and Hussein Mousavi	Afghanistan	2013
Student Film	Behind the Wheel	Elise Laker	Tajikistan	2013
	Blobfish	Ugur Ferhat Kormaz	Turkey	2013
	A Chronicle of Tahrir Square	Nour Zaki	Egypt	2014

== 2017 film festival winners ==
Category	Title	Director	Country of origin	Year Made
Leslie Sacks Grand Prize	Masoumeh	Sona Moghadam	Iran	2015
Best Documentary Feature	Profession: Documentarist	Shirin Barghnavard, Firouzeh Khosrovani, Farahnaz Sharifi, Mina Keshavarz, Sepideh Abtahi, Sahar Salahshour, Nahid Rezaei	Iran	2015
Best Documentary Short	Women of Fukushima	Paul Johannessen and Jeffrey Jousan	Japan	2012
Best Narrative Short	Leeches	Payal Sethi	India	2016
Best Experimental Film	Borders	Elizabeth Mizon	United Kingdom	2015
Audience Choice	Save Gangamaya	Gopal Shivakoti	Nepal	2016
	Auto Driver	Meena Longjam	India	2015
Best Audience Choice	I Don't Like Her	Javad Daraei	Iran	2016
	Memory of a Heart	Tribeny Rai	India	2016

== 2018 film festival winners ==
Category	Title	Director	Country of origin	Year Made
Leslie Sacks Grand Prize	Qandeel	Saad Khan and Tazeen Bari	Pakistan	N/A
Best Documentary Feature	Hauntings in the Archive!	Nina Hoechtl and Julia Wieger	N/A	N/A
Best Documentary Short	Kayayo, the Living Shopping Baskets	Mari Bakke Riise	Ghana	N/A
Best Narrative Short	Sea Child	Minha Kim	N/A	2015
Best Experimental Film	The First of the Free Girls	Alexandra Velasco	N/A	N/A
Audience Choice	Ballad for Syria	Eda Elif Tibet	N/A	N/A
	Kayan: Beyond the Rings	Marko Randelovic	N/A	N/A
	Aver	Felicia Villarreal	N/A	N/A
	Beauty Fear Violence	Anouk Phéline	N/A	N/A
