= Hilton Schlosberg =

British billionaire businessman

- Born: 1952 or 1953 (age 73–74); South Africa
- Education: University of the Witwatersrand
- Occupations: President and COO, Monster Beverage
- Spouse: Michelle Schlosberg

Hilton Hiller Schlosberg (born 1952/1953) is a South African–born British billionaire businessman. He has been the chief executive officer of Monster Beverage since June 2025 and the vice chairman and president since 1990.

== Early life ==
Schlosberg was born in South Africa to a Jewish family. He was educated at the University of the Witwatersrand in Johannesburg, South Africa.

== Career ==
In 1990, a consortium led by Schlosberg and his fellow South African, Rodney Sacks, acquired Hansen Natural Corporation, which in 1992 acquired Hansen’s Natural Soda and Apple Juice for $14.5 million. Since 1990, Schlosberg has been President and COO of Hansen Natural Corporation, which changed its name to Monster Beverage Corporation in 2012. Schlosberg has been Chief Financial Officer of the Company since July 1996, Member of the Executive Committee since October 1992, and Vice Chairman, Secretary and a Director of MEC from July 1992 to the present.

In June 2025, Schlosberg and Sacks acquired Thrifty Ice Cream through their company Hilton Holdings.

== Personal life ==
He is married to Michelle Schlosberg.

In May 2025, the Sunday Times Rich List estimated his net worth to be £5.457 billion.
