= Addam Yekutieli =

American-born Israeli artist

Addam Yekutieli אדם יקותיאלי
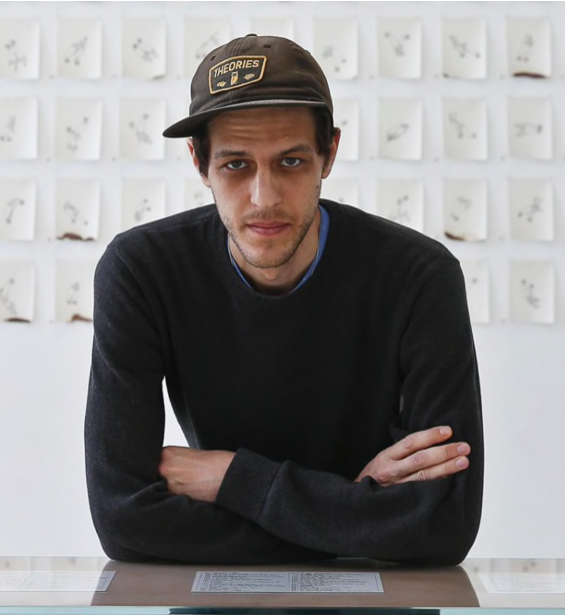
- Addam Yekutieli at Gordon Gallery, 2019
- Born: 1986 (age 39–40); Fountain Valley, California
- Known for: Conceptual art; Contemporary art; Street art; Social practice; Public art
- Movement: Street art
- Website: thisislimbo.com

Addam Yekutieli a.k.a. Know Hope (Hebrew: אדם יקותיאלי; born 1986) is an American-born Israeli artist who creates social practice projects, immersive installations and public artworks. He gained international recognition for his work under the pseudonym Know Hope.

In 2025, Yekutieli was the subject of the documentary film Know Hope, directed by Omer Shamir and produced by Shlomi Elkabetz, which won the Best Film award at the DocAviv International Film Festival, an Oscar-qualifying film festival.

== Biography ==
Yekutieli grew up in a mixed heritage home, with roots in Japan, USA, and Israel. In his teens, he found inspiration in punk subculture and skateboarding. This heavily influenced the aesthetics in his early work. In his late teens he began creating art in streets of Tel Aviv. Although his art was categorized as street art, Yekutieli did not use traditional aerosol spray paint, but rather acrylic paint, markers, paper and cardboard. Many of his early works were of the ephemeral nature, not intended to remain on the street permanently, using materials such as wheatpaste and found objects.

== Art career ==
Yekutiel creates community art that addresses re-contextualization and dialogue through public space. His work is a springboard for cross cultural encounters, examining issues such as borders, collective memory, and the nexus between the personal and the political. Yekutieli is a leading figure in Israeli street-art culture, but also exhibits in galleries and museums. His work combines ready-made materials, mixed media pieces, photographs, videos and text. According to Complex, Yekutieli is considered one of the world's leading contemporary street artists. Though a visual artist, text is a prominent element in Yekutieli's work, known for its "poetry and lyricism." His work revolves around the human condition and around finding "unity in a fragmented world."

Shortly after beginning to work on the street, Yekutieli began writing the phrase “Know Hope” on walls around the city. Due to the word-play and the difference between reading the text and hearing it as 'no hope,' the name conjures up the chasm between hope and despair. The ambiguity and multiple meanings continued to inform his work although he claims he never intended for it to be his artist name.

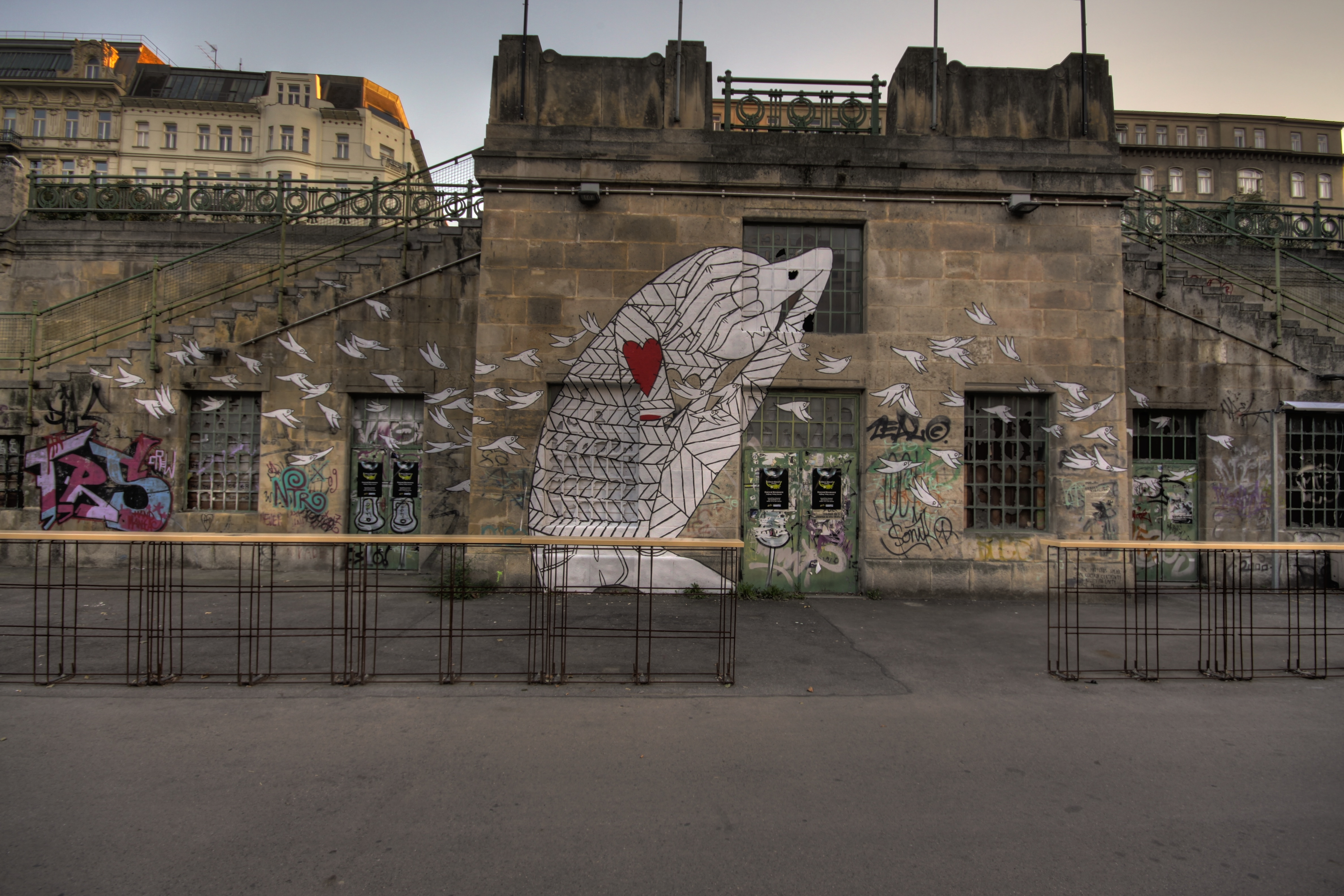
Know Hope artwork in Vienna

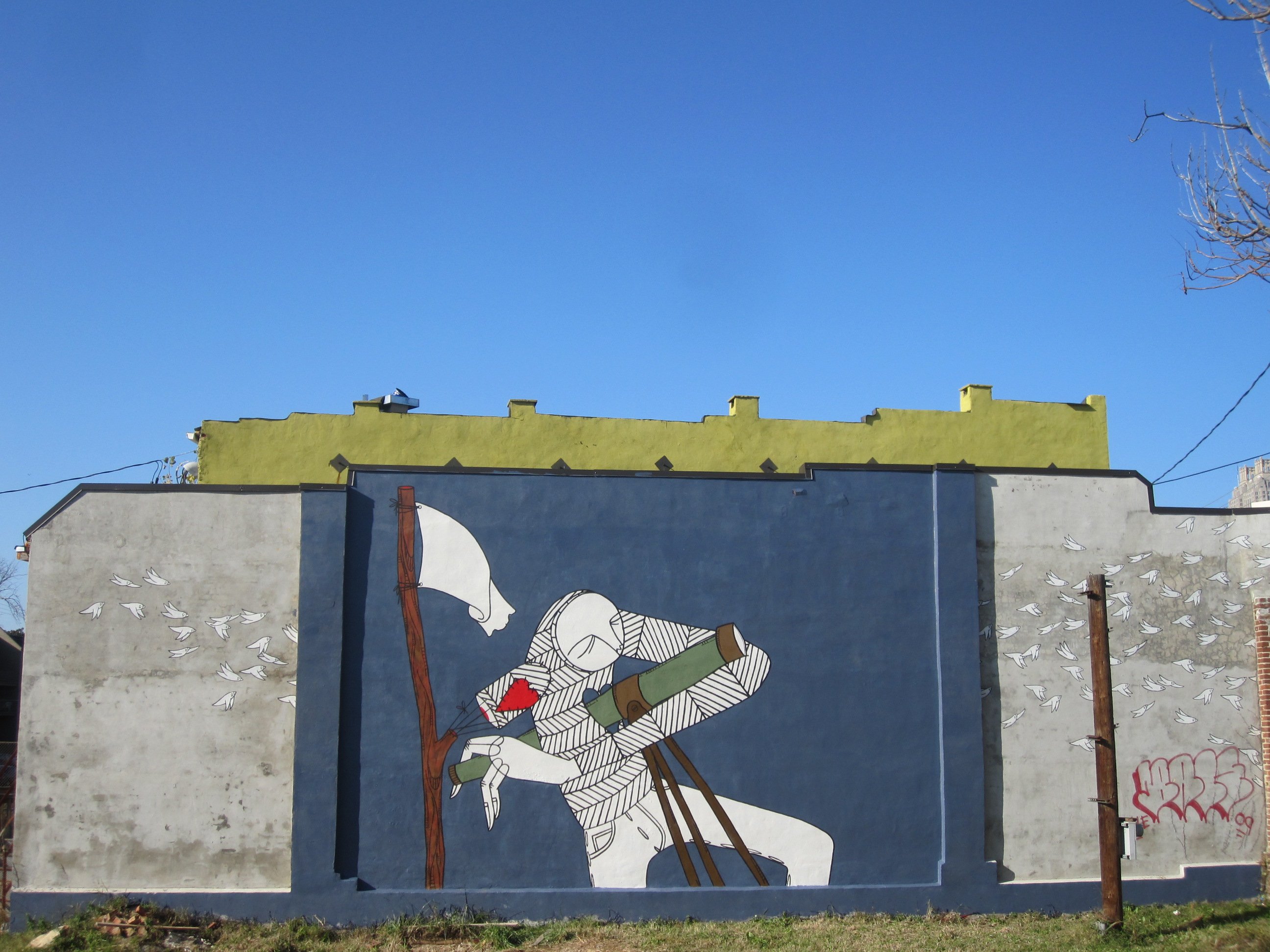
Know Hope artwork in Atlanta

Yekutieli's work began to appear in the streets of Tel Aviv in early 2005, often featuring a long-armed, long-legged unisex character. In 2013, after taking part in the INSIDE JOB, a street-art group show in the Helena Rubenstein Pavilion for Contemporary Art, Yekutieli began exhibiting in Gordon Gallery in Tel Aviv. That same year, Yekutieli also started working with Steve Lazarides and his London-based gallery Lazarides Rathbone. In 2014 Yekutieli took part in a group exhibit in the Roskilde Museum of Contemporary Art. In 2014, parallel to his iconography work that by now has developed to include a repetitive use of white-flags, birds, wood, and fences, Yekutieli began working on long term ongoing projects.

=== Truth and Method (2014–present) ===
In late 2014 Yekutieli sent out an open call for participants in Tel Aviv and NYC to take part in his art and allow him to tattoo them. Yekutieli's websites describes the project as:

"Truth and Method is firmly based on real human situations, continuing a process of extensive observations of context and appropriation whilst providing greater insight into a reflective practice.

Images of site-specific street pieces form the basis of the exhibition, with a series of poignant, text-based messages creating open-ended narratives reinforced by their context. This initial starting point allows each urban environment to take an active part in the dialogue and determine how the audience may perceive them.

Following this, the same texts are tattooed on volunteer participants, extending the work away from the ethereal nature of outdoor work and instead taking on a more permanent quality. By translating the initial text-based artwork onto active participants the work manifests itself in a new shape with a far more intimate meaning."

The Truth and Method project was first exhibited in the Tel Aviv Gordon Gallery. Later on in 2015 Yekutieli exhibited another section of the project, in which he tattooed about 50 participants, in the NYC-based gallery Catinca Tabacaru.

=== Taking Sides (2015–present) ===
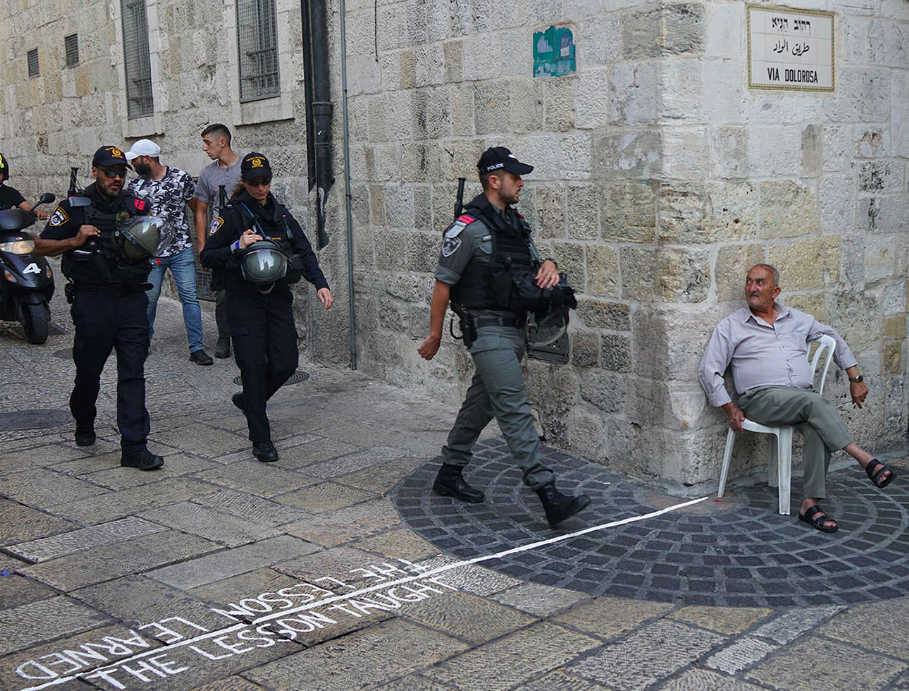

During a residency in Cologne (Germany), Yekutieli began a series of public interventions in which a thin white line was drawn in the street to create a supposed border. On both sides of the line opposing sentences are written to enhance the idea of space as difference and otherness.

"Creating juxtapositions between the personal and the political, Taking Sides is an observation on how sometimes sides are chosen and larger ideologies and allegiances are adopted- at times consciously, but most commonly in a hereditary and automatic way, or in a manner dictated by circumstance."

During 2016 Yekutieli undertook another series of interventions this time in the city of Lyon for a group exhibit in the Musée d'art contemporain de Lyon. This time adding video-art as another medium in this project, Yekutieli juxtaposed videos documenting intervention in public space around the city of Lyon with videos that exhibit notions of territory and borders such as the Israeli Separation Wall, the Lesvos Shoreline, and the Calais Eurotunnel.

=== Vicariously Speaking (2016–present) ===
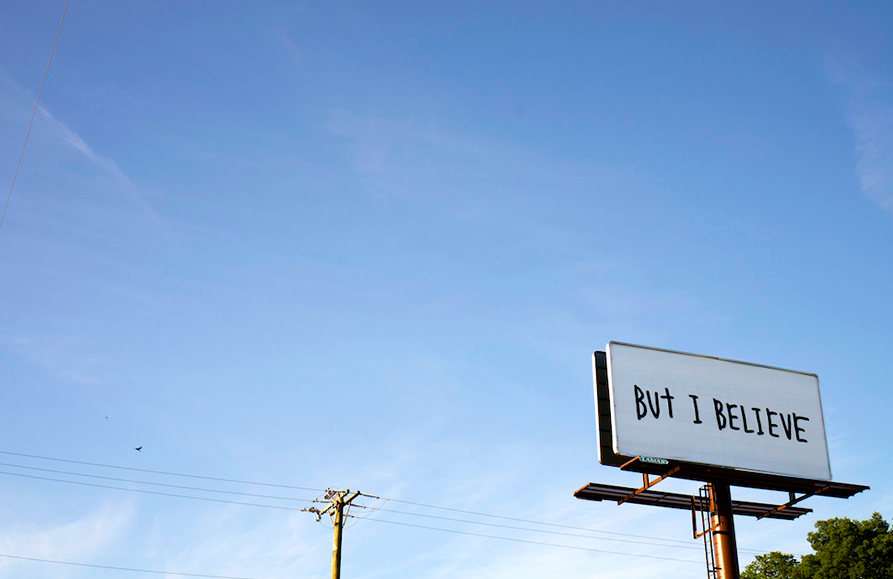

In 2016 working with OZ Arts in Nashville (U.S.A) for a community-based project, Addam began corresponding with prisoner who are currently on death row in a Nashville prison. Yekutieli describes the project in his website:

"Following this correspondence, fragments of sentences from the inmates’ letters were extracted and placed on a series of billboards around the city.

By taking these phrases out of their original context and placing them in a new one, a newfound presence for the inmates takes place in public space and a dialogue within an interactive environment is created between two separate realities.

This dynamic process allows a reflection on notions such as ones origin and permits an intuitive and empathetic understanding of a commonly complex issue."

This project was shown in OZ Arts during 2016 but did not yet receive a comprehensive gallery day-view due to its ongoing nature that requires a longer period of correspondence and documentation.

=== KNOW HOPE Documentary Film (2025) ===
The documentary film (2025) follows Yekutieli for nearly a decade of work. It shows the work of the artist and the relationship between art and resistance during the period of the israel-Gaza war. The film reveals Yekutieli's chronic illness for the first time. The anonymity of the hit-and-run street artist is replaced with intensive and intimate social interactions, exploring how personal and collective trauma can be transformed through art. In this critical moment in history, this film shows the sickness of the land through personal stories of injuries and trauma caused by a century of colonization.

The film was produced by Deax Beaux Garçons, Shlomi Elkabetz, production company.

The premiere of the film took place in DocAviv, with Shamir wearing a Stop The Genocide t-shirt and Elkabetz reading an anti-war statement on stage.

The film won the Best Israeli Documentary award. The jury was composed of Tom Shoval, Alissa Simon, Neta Shoshani.

"As the artist at the center of this work, the film itself manages to shine through the darkness of our life like a ray of light. Through sensitive and multi-layered storytelling, it reveals the scarred character of its protagonist and creates connections between personal and physical pain, and the collective pain of a time and a place.This intimate film provokes reflection on the relationship between art and reality, and on the meaning of art in times of war. With a rich yet delicate cinematic language, the filmmaker has created a work that lingers with the viewer long after the screening."

== Exhibitions ==
=== Selected solo exhibitions ===
- 2007: Just Because You Are Listening, The New and Bad Gallery, Tel-Aviv, Israel
- 2008: Temporary Residence, Anno Domini Gallery, San Jose, CA
- 2009: How We Got There//Like Pigeons in the Rain, X-Initiative, New York City
- 2009: The Times Won’t Save You (This Rain Smells of Memory), Carmichael Gallery, Los Angeles, CA
- 2009: Through These Vacant Spaces We Can See Anywhere, Rialto, Rome
- 2009: The Insecurities of Time, Ad Hoc Art, New York City
- 2010: There Is Nothing Dear (There Is Too Much Dear), Cooper Cole Gallery, Toronto, Canada
- 2011: Bound By The Ties, The Speak Easy, Tel Aviv, Israel (Book release event and installation)
- 2012: Others' Truths, zine release event and exhibition, Studio Gallery, Tel Aviv, Israel
- 2012: Representing Israel at Art Beijing, Beijing
- 2012: The Weight, Known Gallery, Los Angeles, CA
- 2013: The Abstract and the Very Real, Lazarides Gallery, London
- 2013: Things That Stand Between/ Things Left Standing Behind, two part solo exhibition Gordon Gallery 2, Tel Aviv, Israel
- 2014: These Traintracks, They Remain, Ungrudged by the Passing Through, Thinkspace Gallery at Scope Art Fair, New York City
- 2015: Empathy, Catinca Tabacaru Gallery, New York City
- 2015: Water Takes the Shape of Its Container, Openspace Gallery, Paris
- 2015: Truth and Method, Gordon Gallery, Tel Aviv, Israel
- 2016: These Are Maps, Gordon Gallery, Tel Aviv, Israel
- 2016: The Truth, As Told In Our Mother Tongue, Die Kunstagentin, Cologne, Germany
- 2017: It Took Me Till Now To Find You, Lazarides Gallery, London
- 2019: A Pathology of Hope, Gordon Gallery, Tel Aviv

=== Selected group exhibitions ===
- 2011: The Underbelly Project, Pop-up show, in association with Opera Gallery New York, Miami, FL
- 2011: Inside Job- Street Art In Tel Aviv, Helena Rubenstein Pavilion for Contemporary Art (Tel Aviv Museum), Tel Aviv, Israel
- 2014: Streets of the World, Opera Gallery, New York City
- 2012: Winter Group Show, White Walls Gallery, San Francisco, CA
- 2013: Needles+Pens 10 Year Anniversary Show, The Luggage Store, San Francisco, CA
- 2014: Cash, Cans & Candy, HilgerNEXT Gallery, Vienna, Austria
- 2014: PULP, The Outsiders, Newcastle, UK
- 2014: Space/Squared, White Walls Gallery, San Francisco, CA
- 2014: Pow!Wow!: Exploring the New Contemporary Art Movement, Honolulu Museum of Art School, Honolulu, Hawaii, USA
- 2014: Black Milk- Holocaust in Contemporary Art, Museum of Contemporary Art in Roskilde, Denmark
- 2015: Invisible College, Fort Wayne Museum of Art in association with Thinkspace Gallery, Fort Wayne, Indiana, USA
- 2015: La Familia, Thinkspace Gallery, Culver City, CA
- 2016: WordsWordsWords, Spring Break Art Fair
- 2016: Still Here, Lazarides Gallery, London
- 2016: Jameco Exchange, in association with No Longer Empty
- 2016: Wall Drawings – Urban Icons, Musée d'art contemporain de Lyon, Lyon, France
