= Ze'ev Bielski =

Israeli politician

- זאב בילסקי
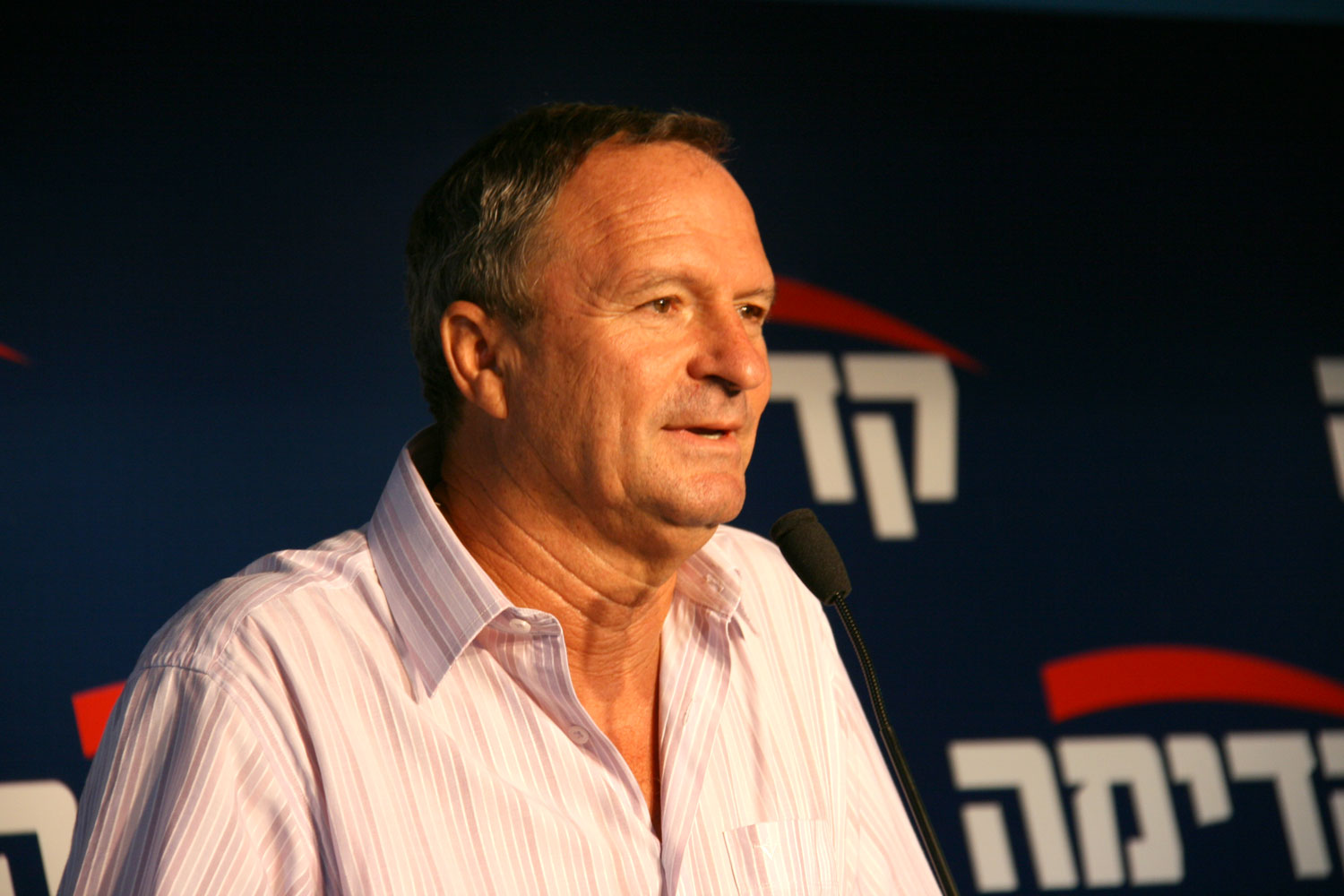

Faction represented in the Knesset
- 2009–2013: Kadima

Personal details
- Born: 13 March 1949 (age 77) Jerusalem

Ze'ev Bielski (Hebrew: זאב בילסקי; born 13 March 1949) is on an Israeli politician who served as a member of the Knesset for Kadima between 2009 and 2013. He previously chaired the Jewish Agency and the World Zionist Organization and worked as a Jewish Agency emissary in South Africa. He was the mayor of Ra'anana (1989–2005, 2013–2018).

== Biography ==
=== Early life ===
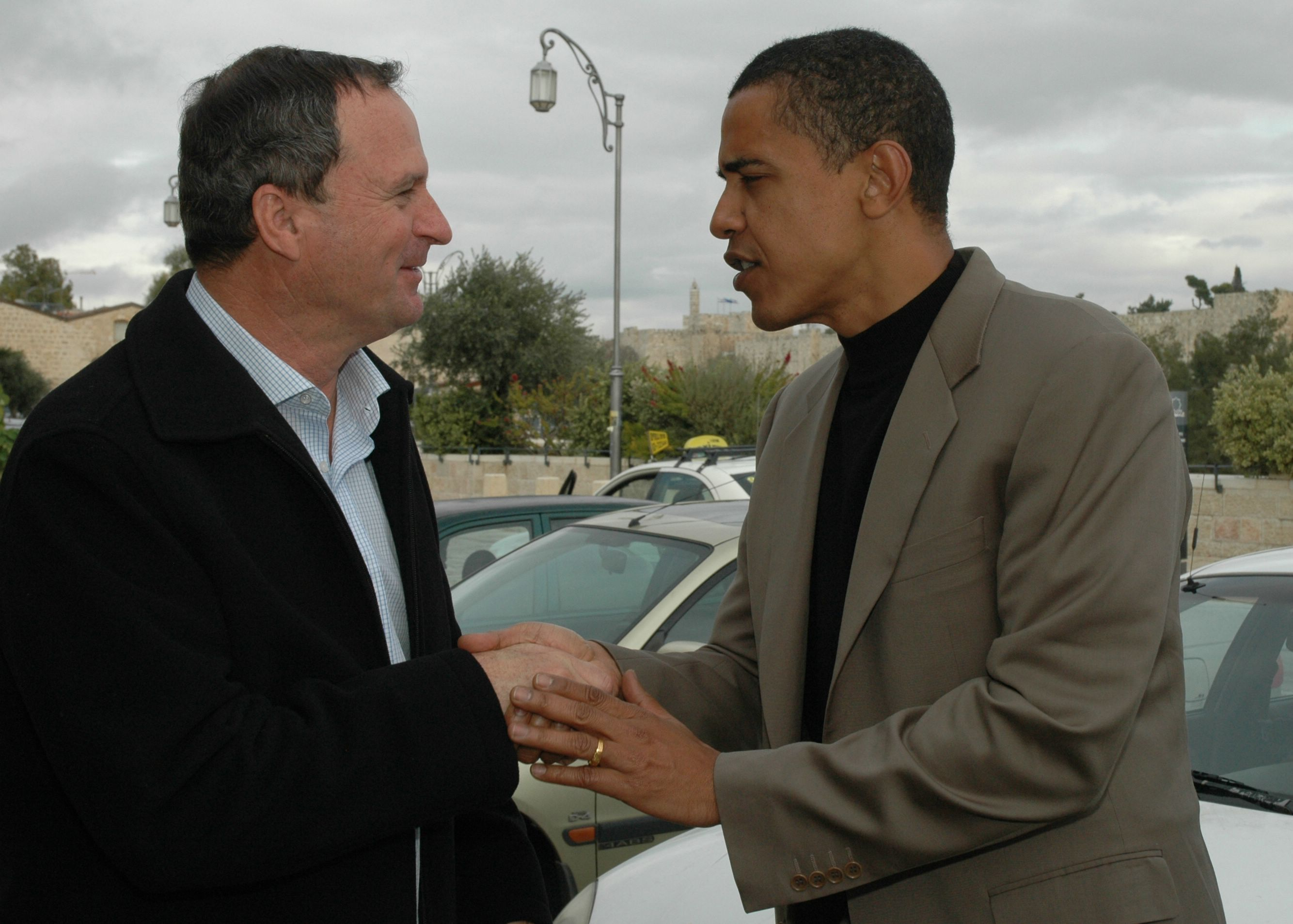
Chairman of the Jewish Agency Ze'ev Bielski meeting Senator Barack Obama in Jerusalem, 2006

Bielski was born and raised in Jerusalem. He attended high school in the Hebrew University Secondary School. Between 1967 and 1970 he served in the IDF, where he reached the level of Major. He earned a BA in economics at the Hebrew University of Jerusalem.

=== Public life ===
Between 1977 and 1980 he was the leading Jewish Agency emissary in South Africa. In 1989, after coming back to Israel, he became the Mayor of Ra'anana. During his mayorship, he also served as the Deputy Chairman of the Union of Local Authorities in Israel between 1996 and 1999, and as the National Chairman of the anti-drug organization, "Al-Sam" from 1994 to 1996.

On 23 June 2005 he was elected a member of the World Zionist Organization Council as a member of Herut – The National Movement. On 28 June he succeeded Salai Meridor as the chairman of the Jewish Agency. His candidacy for this position was supported by Ariel Sharon.

Prior to the 2009 elections he was placed 15th on the Kadima list, and entered the Knesset as the party won 28 seats. He chose not to run in the 2013 elections.

=== Private life ===
Ze'ev Bielski is married to Caron Sacks, sister of South African billionaire Rodney Sacks and of art collector Leslie Sacks

== American Jews ==
Bielski told The Jerusalem Post that Jews in America have no future in America. Due to the size of America he believes assimilation is inevitable, and all Jews in America should move to Israel.
