= Center for Technology in Government =

US research institute

- Logo of the research institution
- Established: 1993
- President: Antonio Civitella
- Subsidiaries: University of Albany
- Address: 1215 Western Ave UAB 120, Albany, NY 12203
- Location: Albany, New York, United States
- Coordinates: 42°43′19.88″N 73°48′2.39″W
- Interactive map of Center for Technology in Government

Center for Technology in Government is a research institution at the University at Albany in Albany, New York, that focuses on the development of innovative solutions to help government provide better public services through technology. Through applied research and partnerships (e.g. with the Major Cities of Europe IT Users Group), projects are undertaken that address the policy, management, and technology dimensions of information use in the public sector.

== Research Area ==
CTG's research areas include information sharing between government organizations. Researchers at CTG have conducted major studies on this topic about which little theoretical research has been conducted outside of Geographic Information System (GIS) area (Richelieu, 2006, p. 310). Examples include their studies on knowledge networks in the public sector (Dawes, Creswell, & Pardo, 2009) and the framework for information sharing between state and local governments (Dawes et al., 1997).

== Awards ==
Since 1993, CTG has earned recognition from state and national organizations for both its organizational accomplishments, scholarly papers, and the individual expertise and service of its staff. The Center has received honors such as Ford Foundation's Innovations in American Government award and Governing Magazine’s Public Official of the Year award. The Center also received a grant of $99,713 to help spread information about being able to use government information and services at libraries. The project is going to include the use of online tools and workshops. The specific list of the 24 awards, including organizational awards, project awards, best paper awards, and individual and University awards is on the center's Web site:
