= Commerce & Trade Group =

Branch of the Central Superior Services of Pakistan

The Commerce and Trade Group (CTG) is a branch of the Central Superior Services of Pakistan. The Commerce and Trade Group is responsible for the commercial diplomacy and economic development of Pakistan. In order to safeguard Pakistan's commercial interests and enhance market access, the CTG was created in 1973 to help Pakistan in developing Pakistan trade ties abroad and to cater the modern needs of specialized officer for trade policy and implementation.

The Officers from this cadre are mainly posted in the Ministry of Commerce, Trade Development Authority of Pakistan Ministry of Commerce, Intellectual Property Organization (IPO), Pakistan Horticulture Development and Export Company, Pakistan Institute of Trade and Development(PITAD). Besides they are posted in Trade Missions Abroad as Trade and Investment Attaches (BS 18), Trade and Investment Counselors (BS 19), Trade Minister/Counsel General (BS 20/21), and Ambassador to the WTO (BS 21). CTG officers negotiate bilateral, multilateral and unilateral trade deals with the trade partners of Pakistan. They are not only responsible for international trade but domestic commerce as well. They formulate and implement trade policy, which lays out the fundamentals of the commercial choices for the country. The job description also includes formulating the Tariff Policy of Pakistan. The group has attained more importance in the wake of the global shift from political to commercial/economic diplomacy. The CTG mans the Ministry of Commerce and its attached departments, as well as other economic ministries and provincial departments that deal with commerce, investment, industries, and agriculture.

The new entrants into this service go through a compulsory nine-month training program in the Civil Services Academy which is called Common Training Program(CTP) along-with all other services and groups. After that, they undergo a ten-month Specialized Training Program(STP) where they learn the Multilateral Trading System, World Trade Organisation(WTO), Development Economics, and other relevant subjects.

The CTG is a part of the Ministry of Commerce. They lead foreign trade negotiations with different countries to secure trade deals. Pakistan has successfully negotiated three Free Trade Agreements (FTAs) with Sri Lanka, China, and Malaysia, as well as three Preferential Trade Agreements (PTAs) with Iran, Mauritius, and Indonesia. Pakistan is also part of SAFTA and ECOTA. Through successful negotiations, Pakistan secured GSP-plus status from the EU, which means that more than 90% of Pakistan's exports are received at zero import duty by the 28 countries of the EU. Besides commercial diplomacy, the CTG officers mainly deal with exports, imports, tariff, WTO, foreign trade, regulation of Chambers of Commerce and trade bodies, trade defense laws, intellectual property, public sector insurance organizations (State Life Insurance, National Insurance (NICL), Pakistan Reinsurance (PRCL), trade disputes, and more.
