= Adi Bielski =

Israeli theatre and movie actress

- עדי בילסקי
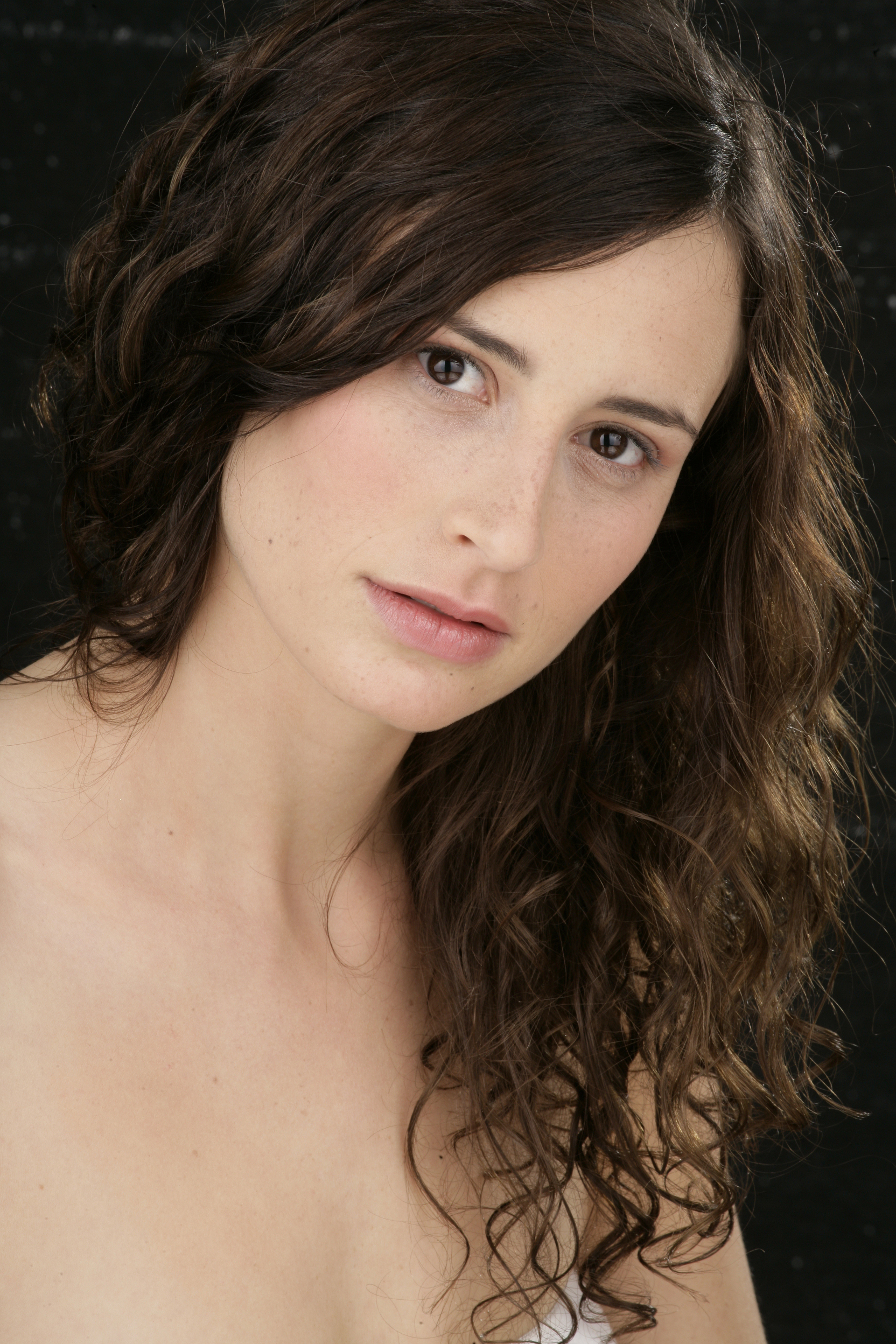
- Born: January 28, 1982 (age 44); Jerusalem, Israel
- Occupation: Actress
- Spouse: Yaniv Adani (2009-Present)
- Children: Lavi (2010), Ma'or (2012)
- Parent(s): Ze'ev Bielski & Caron Sacks

Adi Bielski (Hebrew: עדי בילסקי; born January 28, 1982) is an Israeli theatre and movie actress . She was born in Jerusalem and raised in Ra’anana.

== Education ==
When she was only 3 years old, Bielski took up dancing in a dance studio and during the following 15 years she danced ballet and modern dance in the studio’s group. She also took drama classes as a child and studied in the theatre program in High School.

When she was 18, Bielski was drafted to the Israel Defense Forces and served as an Education Officer and later as a commander in a course for Education NCOs.

Between 2004 through 2007 Bielski studied acting at the Yoram Loewenstein Performing Arts Studio one of Israel’s leading acting schools, located in Tel Aviv. During school, she won an academic scholarship awarded by the "America-Israel Cultural Foundation", as well as other scholarships directly from the school.

== Acting career ==
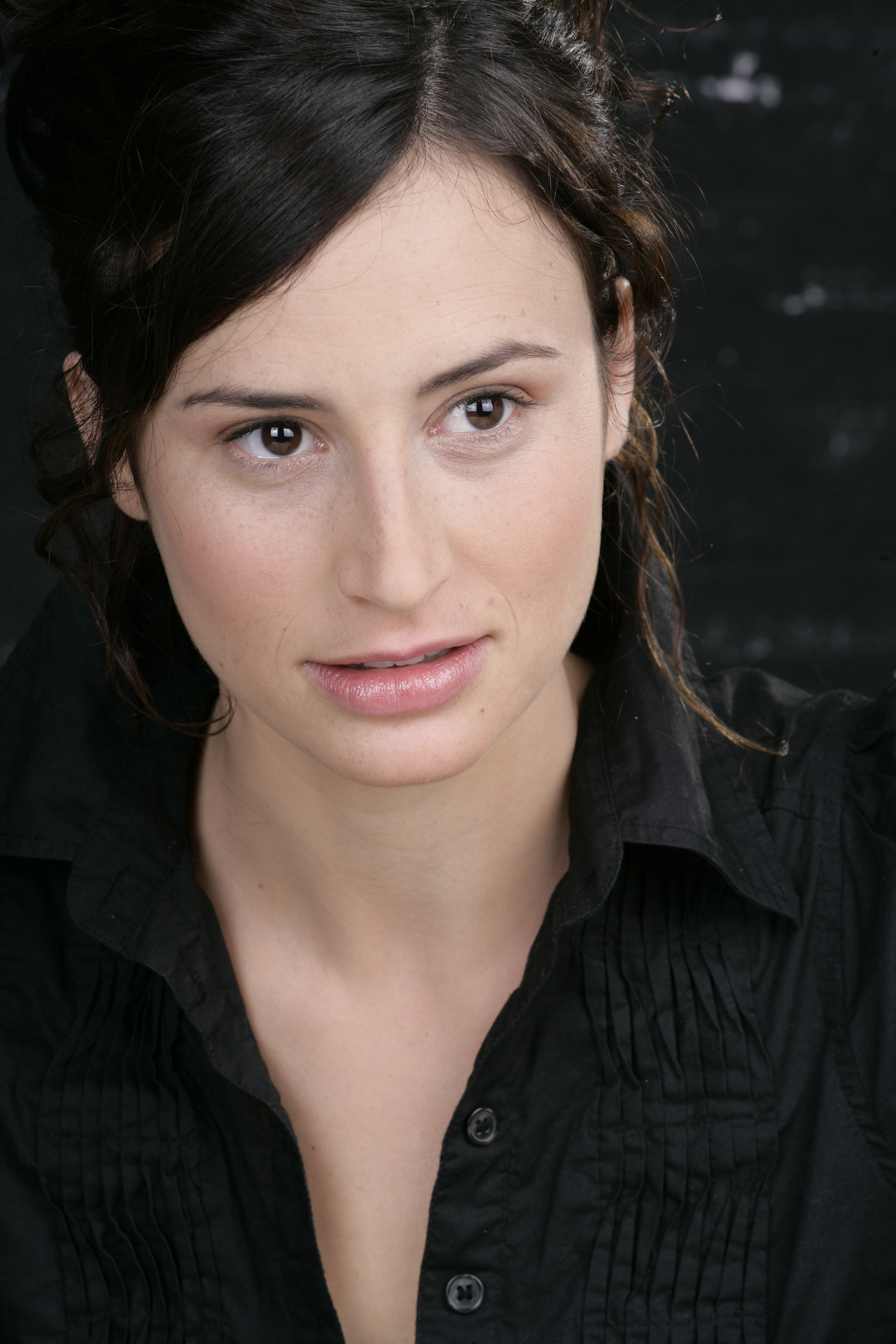
Adi Bielski

In 2007, Bielski finished acting school and had already appeared in various theatre shows, such as Ray Cooney’s Hebrew translated "It Runs in the Family" (as Rosemary Mortimore), and played a guest role on a "Yes" (Satellite television provider) TV series.

In the beginning of 2008, as soon as she finished acting school, Bielski was offered to play in the one-woman show "An Israeli Love Story". The play was written and directed by Pnina Gary, and it is based on Gary’s own true life story.

Another major role came in 2008, when Bielski was cast in the role of "Maya" in Beit Lessin Theater’s "Alma and Ruth".

Bielski also appeared, in a leading role, in several TV commercials, for "Elite Turkish Coffee", "Bank Hapoalim", "Soglowek", "Shufersal", "Maccabi Health Care Services", "Mey Eden" and "Sano".

In 2009, Bielski won the Israeli "Best Actress" Award in Fringe Theater for her multi-character role in "An Israeli Love Story".

On March 28, 2011, a special evening marked the celebrating of 250 shows of that play, which runs at Tel Aviv’s Cameri Theater. Attending that evening, was the Israeli Minister of Culture, Mrs Limor Livnat.

"An Israeli Love Story" was also performed in English at "The Leeds Jewish International Performing Arts Festival" in 2009, at London’s "New End Theatre" on May 18 to June 6, 2010, and at the National Arts Centre in Ottawa as well as Montreal, Toronto and Washington DC in September 2011. The show was also performed in the Harold Green Jewish Theatre in Toronto in 2014.

In 2010, after she was seen on London’s "New End Theatre", Bielski was cast in the leading female role of the British film "The Veteran" starring Toby Kebbell.

In 2012 Bielski played in "My Name is Yuda", a poetry theater show based on the poems of Yehuda Amichai. In the same year she won the Cyprus International Film Festival Best Actress award for her performance in the short film "Salt of the Earth".

In 2016 the film (in Hebrew) "Sipur Ahava Eretz-Israeli" ("An Israeli Love Story") was released, starring Bielski and directed by Dan Wolman, based on Pnina Gary's life's story and monodrama by the same name.

=== Films ===
- 2008 - "Take Note" (as the "Lieutenant") - A Tel Aviv University student film, which appeared in the Israeli "International Women’s Film Festival".
- 2008 - "Turbulence" (as "Rona") - An interactive film, which won the Grand Festival Experimental Feature Award at the "Berkeley Video and Film festival" in 2010.
- 2011 - "Salt of the Earth" (as "Iris") - A Sapir Academic College short film, in the Israeli international "Cinema South Film Festival"; The "Cyprus International Film Festival" 2012.
- 2011 - "The Veteran" (as "Alayna Wallace").
- 2016 - "Sipur Ahava Eretz-Israeli" (as "Margalit Dromi").

== Personal life ==
In 2009, Bielski married the actor Yaniv Adani, with whom she has two sons one born in 2010, the other 2012.
