= CTG Collective =

American art nonprofit organization

The CTG Collective is a not-for-profit art organization.

The Collective was founded by Rachel Monosov, Catinca Tabacaru and Justin Orvis Steimer.

== List of residencies ==
CTG(R): ZImbabwe, 2015

- Participants: Virginia Chihota, Admire Kamudzengerere, Rachel Monosov, Terrence Musekiwa, Gareth Nyandoro, Xavier Robles de Medina, Justin Orvis Steimer

CTG(R): NewFoundland, 2016

- Participants: Rachel Monosov, Terrence Musekiwa, Yapci Ramos and Justin Orvis Steimer, in collaboration with Pool’s Island descendant Matthew Evans

== Exhibitions ==
- 1972: Rachel Monosov and Admire Kamudzengerere
- TERRA NOVA: Rachel Monosov, Terrence Musekiwa, Yapci Ramos, Justin Orvis Steimer
- Zig Zag Zim: Part II: Admire Kamudzengerere, Rachel Monosov, Terrence Musekiwa, Xavier Robles de Medina, Justin Orvis Steimer
- Zig Zag Zim: Virginia Chihota, Admire Kamudzengerere, Rachel Monosov, Terrence Musekiwa, Xavier Robles de Medina, Justin Orvis Steimer
- National Gallery of Zimbabwe, Harare (2016)
