= City Protocol =

New open, global, and progressive working framework

The City Protocol is an open, global, and progressive working framework for cities worldwide to assess and improve performance in environmental sustainability, economic competitiveness, quality of life, and city services, by innovating and demonstrating new leadership models, new ways of engaging society, and by leveraging new information and communication technologies (ICT).

Many initiatives exist today on various indicators (quality, performance and life) and on normalization of trade. The City Protocol addresses the city under a systemic approach. Cities can usefully be described as complex systems since their components interact and co-determine their future. Thus, urban planning is limited by the very nature of their complexity. The city has a metabolism and an ecosystem, it’is heterogeneous. Like any complex system, it changes over time, it evolves, it is fragile and must adapt to changes. Resilience is the key to also ensure continuity of services in the city at any time of crisis. Two major vectors thorough the development of the city, the need, its uses and functions, and chance, hazard and risk. The city should be adaptive, learning, evolving, robust, autonomous, self-repairing, and self-reproducing.

== Goals ==
The City Protocol has five fundamental goals:

1. To facilitate and foster a new science of cities.
2. To establish a cooperation framework among the city council, academia, companies, organizations and people/society.
3. To lead and pave cities’ futures.
4. To understand the common driving forces of urban evolution and find common game-changing solutions.
5. To find innovative economical opportunities and synergies: and deliver value-adding products and services.

The City Protocol's aim is to globally change city-thinking and remain appealing to many cities and smart city communities. To create a reflection community, a sharing space and opportunities to build complete or partial solutions to allow the emergent for new solutions for a sustainable city.

== Development Process of the City Protocol ==
The City Protocol was to be created through a number of stages that spanned 18 months:

- Stage 1, to July 2012: Enroll a discrete group of core Cities, Institutions, Industry, and Academia to agree the need for, and shape the City protocol Society. Kick start of Working Groups (CPWG) and areas of work.
- Stage 2, to November 2012: Build agreements (CPA) on the principles, focus, commitment and manner by which the society will operate and the goals and outline content that it will address. The CPS would start operating under this stage.
- Stage 3, to November 2013: Establish from the core committed participants visible initial products that the society can evidence as true and meaningful value. Once the CPS has been established, working groups (WG) will be set up. Said WG will work remotely under a periodical basis. Face to face meetings will take place to discuss and work around the CP.
