= Channel Technologies Group =

California-based company

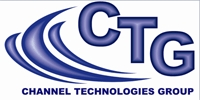
- Type: Private
- Industry: Defense; Naval technology Ceramics; Electronic/electrical manufacturing
- Founded: 1959
- Founder: Robert F. Carlson and Bob Callahan
- Headquarters: Santa Barbara, California, United States
- Area served: Worldwide
- Key people: Ralph L. PhilipsCEO
- Products: Piezoceramics; Ceramics transducers sonar Navigation systems
- Owner: Blue Wolf Capital Partners LLC
- Number of employees: approx. 250
- Website: www.channeltechgroup.com

Channel Technologies Group (CTG) is a California-based company that designs and manufactures piezoelectric materials and transducers for military and commercial market customers.

Based in Santa Barbara, Calif. and with a second manufacturing site in Bolingbrook, Ill., Channel Technologies Group (CTG) first began manufacturing piezoelectric ceramics in 1959. Since that time, CTG has grown, allowing CTG to expand its product offerings to include piezoelectric ceramics, piezoelectric single crystals, transducers, turnkey sonar systems and electro-optical calibration and testing equipment. Its products are used in a multitude of applications, and by a wide variety of end-users including medical device manufacturers, marine explorers and energy companies. CTG also services customers in the defense industry, including several departments of the U.S. Navy and many leading defense contractors.

CTG’s 150,000 sq. ft. of manufacturing space includes a dedicated prototype line, materials research lab, machine shop and testing facilities.

Through CTG’s enterprise resource planning (ERP) system, orders can be managed from one central location and individual components can be tracked from creation through development. This system allows prioritizing developing products in a lean manufacturing environment.

In 2016, after losing over $10 million on long-term contracts, the company declared bankruptcy.
