= The Counterterrorism Group, Inc. =

American counter-terrorist organization

The Counterterrorism Group, Inc. (CTG) is a subsidiary of the global intelligence, risk consulting, and security firm Paladin7 based in Washington, D.C. Specializing in intelligence analysis, and open-source intelligence, research, and counterterrorism operations.

== Description ==
The company is an international intelligence firm that provides a variety of intelligence, and security services. CTG also provides the only virtual remote counterterrorism internship globally known to this date.

== Publications ==
Of their publications, include the Counterterrorism National Intelligence Estimate (NIE), Security Briefs, Daily Terrorist Activity Reports, Threat Assessments, Travel Reports, and Analysis Intelligence Reports. CTG also produces specialty intelligence products, and other counterterrorism related intelligence. CTG is also known for its intelligence report covering the 'Terrorgram' collective publication, The Hard Reset.

== Products ==
The company manages and supports the Counter Threat Center (CTC).
