= List of Israeli films of 1994 =

A list of films produced by the Israeli film industry in 1994.

== 1994 releases ==
=== Unknown premiere date ===
Premiere	Title	Director	Cast	Genre	Notes	Ref
?	Ish She'Ahav B'Ivrit (Hebrew: איש שאהב בעברית, lit. "A man who loved in Hebrew")	Eli Cohen	Irina Seleznyova	Drama		
?	Max V'Morris (Hebrew: מקס ומוריץ, lit. "Max and Morris")	Jacob Goldwasser	Moshe Ivgy, Uri Gavriel	Comedy, Crime, Musical		
?	Aretz Hadasha (Hebrew: ארץ חדשה, lit. "Newland")	Orna Ben-Dor Niv	Ania Bukstein	Drama		
?	Aya: Imagined Autobiography (Hebrew: איה, lit. "Aya")	Michal Bat-Adam	Michal Bat-Adam	Biography, Drama		
?	Ha-Merhak (Hebrew: המרחק, lit. "The distance")	Dan Wolman	Genia Chernik	Drama		
?	Sh'Chur (Hebrew: שחור)	Shmuel Hasfari	Gila Almagor, Ronit Elkabetz	Drama	1994 Israeli submission for the Academy Award for Best Foreign Language Film	
?	Driks' Brother (Hebrew: האח של דריקס)	Ori Inbar and Doron Tsabari	Tal Friedman, Danny Steg	Drama		
?	Ha-Gamal Hame'ofef (Hebrew: הגמל המעופף, lit. "The Flying Camel")	Rami Na'aman	Mosko Alkalai, Gabi Amrani, Gilat Ankori	Comedy		
?	Shirat Ha'Sirena (Hebrew: שירת הסירנה, lit. "Song of the Siren")	Eytan Fox	Dalit Kahan	Romance, Comedy		
?	Ipui Koach (Hebrew: ייפוי כח, lit. "Power of Attorney")	Uri Barbash		Drama		

== Awards ==
=== Ophir Award ===
Sh'Chur by Shmuel Hasfari

=== Wolgin Award ===
Best Israeli Feature: Ha-Merhak (Hebrew: המרחק, lit. "The distance") by Dan Wolman
Best Israeli Documentary: Istiklal by Nizar Hassan
Best Short Film: Home by David Ofek

== See also ==
- 1994 in Israel
