= Yael Abecassis =

Israeli actress and model

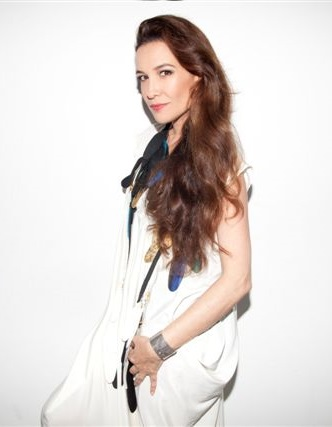
- Born: 19 July 1967 (age 59); Ashkelon, Israel
- Spouses: Lior Miller (m. 1996–2003) Ronny Douek (m. 2005)
- Modeling information
- Hair color: Black

Yael Abecassis (Hebrew: יעל אבקסיס; born 19 July 1967) is an Israeli actress and model.

== Biography ==
Yael Abecassis was born in Ashkelon, Israel, to parents of Moroccan Jewish descent. Abecassis married Israeli actor Lior Miller in 1996 and has one child. They divorced in 2003. She was also married to entrepreneur and philanthropist Ronny Douek. Abecassis is the daughter of Raymonde Abecassis, a Moroccan-Israeli singer and actress.

== Modeling and acting career ==
Yael Abecassis began modeling at the age of 14. She later branched into television and film, appearing in commercials and starring as Rivka in Kadosh, a 1999 retelling of The Dybbuk directed by Amos Gitai. In the 1990s, she starred as a host on Israeli television programs for children, and produced music videos for babies and young children. Towards the end of the 1990s, she left television to pursue a career as a dramatic actress. She starred in several Amos Gitai movies and has won favorable reviews, especially in France.

== Film production ==
In 2012, Abecassis opened a film production company, Cassis Films. The company's first film, Aya, was one of five international shorts nominated for the 2015 Oscars.

== Personal life ==
In 1996, Abecassis married the actor Lior Miller and that same year the couple had a son. In 2003 the two divorced.

From 2004, she was in a relationship with businessman Ronny Douek, and the two had a son in 2005. The couple separated in 2014.

Since 2018, she has been in a relationship with nightlife personality Tzach Bar and resides in Rishpon.

== Filmography ==
- One Day in October (2024)
- Echo (2019)
- Light rail (2018)
- Driver (2018)
- Rabin, the Last Day (2015)
- A Borrowed Identity (2014)
- Atlit (2014)
- Hunting Elephants (2013), Dorit
- Prisoners of War (2010), Talia Klein
- Shiva (2008), Lili
- Survivre avec les loups (2007)
- Sans moi (2007), Marie
- Papa (2005/II), Léa
- Va, vis et deviens (2005), Yaël Harrari
- Until Tomorrow Comes (2004), Daughter
- Alila (2003), Gabi
- Three-Step Dance (2003)
- Life Is Life (2003)
- Miss Entebbe (2003), Elise
- Bella ciao (2001), Nella
- Maria, figlia del suo figlio (2000), Mary of Nazareth
- Kadosh (1999), Rivka
- Shabatot VeHagim (1999), Ella
- Passeur d'enfants (1997), Yael
- L'enfant de la terre promise (1997), Yael
- L'enfant d'Israel (1997)
- Hakita Hameofefet (1995)
- Ha-Yerusha (1993)
- Zarim Balayla (1993)
- Sipurei Tel-Aviv (1992), Sharona
- Pour Sacha (1991), Judith

=== Filmography as self ===
- Shotetut
- HaKaletet

Media offices
Preceded by Lion Rosenberg	Miss Israel host 2000	Succeeded by Aki Avni

== See also ==
- Women in Israel
- Israeli cinema
