= A Married Couple =

A Married Couple may refer to:

- A Married Couple (1969 film), a 1969 Canadian documentary film by Allan King
- A Married Couple (1983 film), a 1983 Israeli drama film by Yitzhak Yeshurun
