= 45th Berlin International Film Festival =

1995 film festival in Berlin, Germany

- Festival poster
- Location: Berlin, Germany
- Founded: 1951
- Awards: Golden Bear: The Bait
- No. of films: 363 films
- Festival date: 9–22 February 1995
- Website: Website

Berlin International Film Festival chronology
- 46th 44th

The 45th annual Berlin International Film Festival was held from 9 to 22 February 1995. Israeli film programmer Lia van Leer was the Jury President for the main competition.

The Golden Bear was awarded to The Bait directed by Bertrand Tavernier.

The retrospective dedicated to American actor Buster Keaton was shown at the festival.

== Juries ==
=== Main Competition ===
The following people were announced as being on the jury for the festival:

- Lia van Leer, Israeli film programmer, founder of Jerusalem Cinematheque-Israel Film Archive and Jerusalem Film Festival - Jury President
- Georgi Djulgerov, Bulgarian filmmaker and producer
- Siqin Gaowa, Chinese actress
- Alfred Hirschmeier, German production designer
- Christiane Hörbiger, Austrian actress
- Vadim Yusov, Russian director of photography
- Dave Kehr, American film critic
- Michael Kutza, American filmmaker and founder of the Chicago International Film Festival
- Pilar Miró, Spanish filmmaker
- Tsai Ming-liang, Taiwanese filmmaker

== Official Sections ==
=== Main Competition ===
The following films were in competition for the Golden Bear and Silver Bear awards:

English title	Original title	Director(s)	Country
The Addiction		Abel Ferrara	United States
A Play for a Passenger	Пьеса для пассажира	Vadim Abdrashitov	Russia
Back to Roots	歸土	Raymond Leung	Hong Kong
The Bait	L'appât	Bertrand Tavernier	France
Before Sunrise		Richard Linklater	United States, Austria, Switzerland
The Blue Villa	Un bruit qui rend fou	Alain Robbe-Grillet, Dimitri de Clercq	France, Belgium, Switzerland
Blush	红粉	Li Shaohong	Hong Kong, China
Butterfly Kiss		Michael Winterbottom	United Kingdom
Colpo di luna		Alberto Simone	Italy, Netherlands, France
Cross My Heart and Hope to Die	Ti kniver i hjertet	Marius Holst	Norway
Hades		Herbert Achternbusch	Germany
King of the River	El rey del río	Manuel Gutiérrez Aragón	Spain
Midaq Alley	El callejón de los milagros	Jorge Fons	Mexico
Nobody's Fool		Robert Benton	United Kingdom
One Hundred and One Nights	Les cent et une nuits de Simon Cinéma	Agnès Varda	France, United Kingdom
Red Rose White Rose	紅玫瑰白玫瑰	Stanley Kwan	Hong Kong, Taiwan
Sh'Chur	שחור	Shmuel Hasfari	Israel
Silent Fall		Bruce Beresford	United States
Smoke		Wayne Wang	United States
Summer Snow	女人四十	Ann Hui	Hong Kong
The Taebaek Mountains	태백산맥	Im Kwon-taek	South Korea
Transatlantis		Christian Wagner	Germany
When Night Is Falling		Patricia Rozema	Canada

== Official Awards ==
=== Main Competition ===
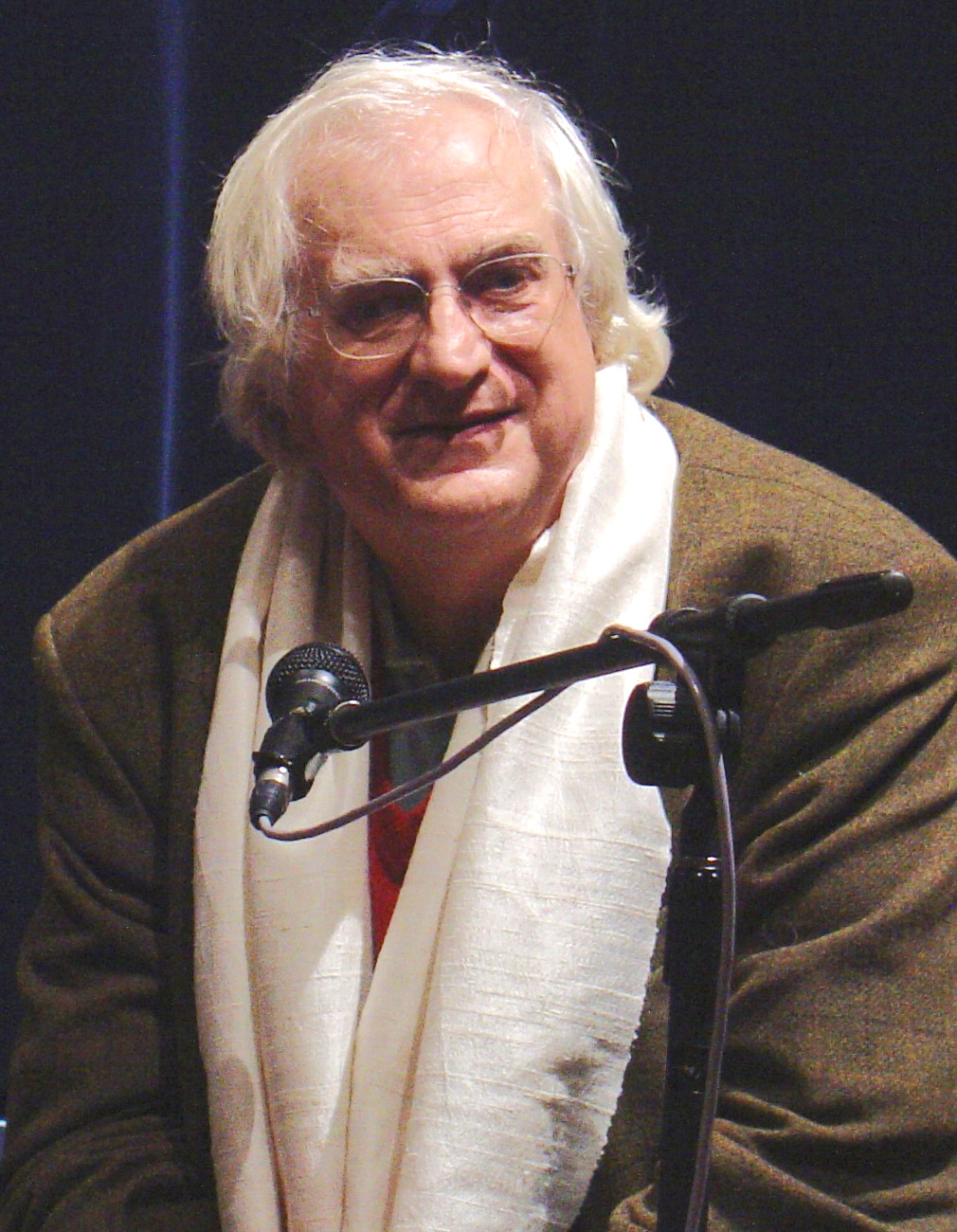
Bertrand Tavernier, winner of the Golden Bear at the festival

The following prizes were awarded by the Jury:

- Golden Bear: The Bait by Bertrand Tavernier
- Silver Bear – Special Jury Prize: Harvey Keitel
- Silver Bear for Best Director: Richard Linklater for Before Sunrise
- Silver Bear for Best Actress: Josephine Siao for Summer Snow
- Silver Bear for Best Actor: Paul Newman for Nobody's Fool
- Silver Bear for an Outstanding Single Achievement: Blush by Li Shaohong
- Silver Bear: A Play for a Passenger
- Honourable Mention:
  - Midaq Alley by Jorge Fons
  - Colpo di luna by Alberto Simone
  - Sh'Chur by Shmuel Hasfari

=== Blue Angel Award ===
- Cross My Heart and Hope to Die by Marius Holst

=== Honorary Golden Bear ===
- Alain Delon
