= Private (film) =

- Directed by: Saverio Costanzo
- Written by: Camilla Costanzo; Saverio Costanzo; Alessio Cremonini
- Produced by: Mario Gianani
- Starring: Mohammad Bakri; Lior Miller
- Distributed by: Typecast Releasing
- Release date: 10 September 2004 (Toronto Film Festival)
- Running time: 90 minutes
- Country: Italy
- Languages: Arabic; English; Hebrew

Private is a 2004 minimalist psychological drama film directed by Saverio Costanzo. A debut film by the director, the film is about a Palestinian family of seven suddenly confronted with a volatile situation in their home that in many ways reflects the larger ongoing conflict between Palestinians and Israel.

Initially selected as the official entry from Italy for the foreign language film category at the 78th Academy Awards, Private was disqualified as its main spoken language is not in Italian (a rule that was changed, effective with the next year's Oscars, partly due to this film). The film has received the Golden Leopard award at the 57th Locarno International Film Festival.

== Synopsis ==
Mohammad, his wife and their five children live in a large, isolated house located halfway between a Palestinian village and an Israeli settlement. The house, in the crossfire of the two sides, is a strategic lookout point that the Israeli army decides to seize, confining the family to a few downstairs rooms in daytime and a single room at night. Mohammad refuses to leave this home and, reinforced by his principles against violence, decides to find a way to keep his family together in the house until the Israeli soldiers move on.

== Cast ==
- Mohammad Bakri as Mohammad B
- Lior Miller as Commander Ofer
- Hend Ayoub as Mariam B
- Tomer Russo as Private Eial
- Arin Omary as Samiah B

== Reviews ==
- The Hollywood Reporter: "While the film is ultimately too limited in its scope to have much lingering impact, it does make for a thoughtful addition to the growing list of films dealing with the Israeli/Palestinian conflict"
- Los Angeles Times: "An appropriately and deliberately gritty, drab-looking and edgy picture"
- New York Times: "Midnight raid by Israeli soldiers turns the home of a Palestinian family into an occupied territory in Saverio Constanzo's politically loaded allegory"
- New York Post: "The Palestinian characters are so thinly conceived that they might as well be named Victims One through Seven, and they're far more developed than the Israeli characters."
- New York Daily News: "Shot with digital cameras, "Private" has a gritty - sometimes grainy - documentary urgency that heightens the inherent tension, keeping viewers unsettled with the notion that a tragedy is always imminent."
- L.A. Weekly: "The young Italian director Saverio Costanzo puts an unnervingly intimate twist on the costs of military occupation in this aptly claustrophobic drama."
- The Times: "Saverio Costanzo’s Italian-made film adopts a stripped-down, naturalistic style to capture the tension as the squad leader proves equally fearsome to his men and the father’s angry children begin small acts of rebellion that threaten an uneasy equilibrium. Emotional and rational arguments fuel the occasionally heavy-handed script but the Israeli-Palestinian cast is strong in a film that shows how both sides are victims of violence."
- Empire: "The script is occasionally heavy-handed in laying out motivation and meaning, but excellent performances from the Israeli-Palestinian cast and a chilling moral elevate this to more than 'issue film' status. "
- CounterPunch: "The film dwells on the intra-family tensions in dealing with the occupation of their house and focuses on the friction arising from the characters' differing views on how to confront the soldiers. The film's focus is how to resist, with a strong suggestion that the resistance should be non-violent. However, the director fails to ask the key question and never really explains why the soldiers invaded this house or why there are any tensions between Israelis and Palestinians."
