= Life Is Life =

Life Is Life may refer to:

- "Life Is Life" (song), a 2011 song by Noah and the Whale
- "Live Is Life", a 1984 song by Opus, covered by Laibach as "Life Is Life"
- Life Is Life (film), a 2003 Israeli independent underground dramatic art film

== See also ==
- Live Is Life (film), 2021 film directed by Dani de la Torre
