= Polishuk =

- פולישוק
- Genre: satire; Serial comedy
- Created by: Shmuel Hasfari
- Developed by: Shmuel Hasfari
- Written by: Shmuel Hasfari
- Directed by: Shmuel Hasfari
- Starring: Sasson Gabai; Hanna Azoulay Hasfari; Amnon Dankner; Shiri Gadni; Guy Loel
- Composer: Uri Ackerman
- Country of origin: Israel
- Original language: Hebrew
- No. of seasons: 3
- No. of episodes: 38

Production
- Executive producer: Tal Maor Ronen
- Running time: 25–30 minutes
- Production company: Keshet Media Group

Original release
- Network: Channel 2
- Release: 31 May 2009 – 12 January 2015

Related
- Yes Minister, The thick of it

Polishuk (Hebrew: פולישוק) is an Israeli political comedy television series. It tells the story of politician Rubi Polishuk, a member of the Melel Party (National Liberal Center) who was unexpectedly appointed as the Minister for Social Advancement.

The series stars Sasson Gabai as Polishuk. It was created written and directed by Shmuel Hasfari and produced by Channel 2 Israel.

Thirty nine episodes, divided into three seasons, have been produced. The series was first shown in Israel in the autumn of 2009. A third season began its run on 2014. The name of the program and titular figure "Polishuk" is a portmanteau of "Politics" (Politika) and "Market" (Shuk) in Hebrew.

== Plot ==
=== Season 1 ===
Rubi Polishuk is a generally unknown member of the Knesset from National Liberal Center Movement (Melel), who suddenly discovered that he has been appointed as Minister for Social Advancement (parody of Ministry of Welfare and Social Services), after the previous minister was accused of sexual offenses and pedophilia. During his office he falls into ridiculous situations that make him both a popular and a national joke.

He manages to get ahead at work thanks to his Head of Bureau, Solly Barzel and Media advisor Tkuma Shaharabani, and at the same time he is supervised by Chairman of Melel and Minister of Justice Hummi Shalit and his media advisor Kozo Avital.

At the end of Season 1 Melel takes part in the elections while its leader Hummi Shalit leaves the party to join A Just Israel Party. Polishuk decides to run for election as Leader of the Melel Party.

=== Season 2 ===
Polishuk is elected as the Leader of Melel, while Hummi Shalit leaves politics and becomes Chief Editor of 'Israel Non-Stop' magazine. After Shalit goes to work for the private sector, Kozo is appointed as the strategic advisor to Polishuk and as the Director-General of Melel.

During Season 2 Rubi is confronted with his eccentric wife, Monique. In the final episode national elections were held. On the day of the election, Rubi's father was hospitalized and died at the same moment as the results were being declared.

=== Season 3 ===
It becomes clear that Polishuk's party has won three seats in the Parliament/Knesset. Shortly after, Rubi is appointed as Foreign Minister, without knowing any foreign languages. During his time as Foreign Minister, he has to face his Fear of flying, the intrigues of the Bulgarian Ambassador and the whims of the Israeli Prime Minister and his Secretary, Kozo Avital.

== Cast ==
- Sasson Gabai as Rubi Polishuk - Knesset member from Melel Party. Appointed as Minister for Social Advancement. Later become a leader of Melel and Minister for Justicial Affairs.
- Amnon Dankner as Hummi Shalit - Minister of Justice and Leader of the Melel Party. Since Season 2 is out of politics.
- Guy Loel as Kozo Avital (Haim Abutbul), Media Advisor of Hummi. During season 2 he advice to Polishuk and become the Director-General of Melel Party. In Season 3 he was appointed Cabinet Secretary.
- Hanna Azoulay Hasfari as Solly Barzel. Head of Polishuk's Bureau. In the past she was Kozo's teacher.
- Shiri Gadni as Tkuma Shaharabani, Energetic and impetuous Media advisor of Polishuk
- Dana Avraham-Semo as Vickey, Secretary
- Pnina Tornai as Monique, Polishuk's wife
- Shlomo Bar-Shavit as Katriel Polishuk, Polishuk's father
- Shosha Goren as Simcha Bechor-Katan, Director of Human Resources in the ministry
- Erez Tadhar as Erez - Polishuk's Bodyguard
