= Orange People (film) =

2013 Israeli drama film

- Hebrew: אנשים כתומים
- Directed by: Hanna Azoulay Hasfari
- Written by: Hanna Azoulay Hasfari
- Starring: Rita Shukrun; Esti Yerushalmi; Hanna Azoulay Hasfari
- Cinematography: Assaf Suderi (Israel); Itai Marom (Morocco)
- Release dates: September 2013 (Haifa Film Festival); May 1, 2014
- Running time: 94 minutes
- Country: Israel
- Languages: Hebrew, Moroccan Arabic
- Budget: 869,500 ILS (~ US$250,000)

Orange People (Hebrew: אנשים כתומים) is a 2013 Israeli drama film, written and directed by Hanna Azoulay Hasfari.

== Plot synopsis ==
The film follows a Moroccan family residing in Jaffa. The grandmother, Zohara (Rita Shukrun), who immigrated from Morocco in the 1950s, is a seer, and many members of the Moroccan community flock to her, so she can dream for them and advise them on life decisions. In return, they pay her generously. When she dreams, Zohara also sees images of her childhood in the Atlas mountains. Zohara is growing old, and tiring, and she puts pressure on her daughter Simone (Esti Yerushalmi) to replace her. Simone wants no part of these old-country rituals, and opens a restaurant, which she struggles to maintain. It seems, however, that the "dreaming" is not willing to let her go, and she suffers from what appears to be narcolepsy, and takes medication to control her inability to fall asleep and her resulting bouts of obsessive cleaning.

Zohar (Meital Gal Souissa), Simone's daughter, gets along with her grandmother but sees the dreaming as a curiosity, and wants to write a school project on narcolepsy. She shows no aptitude for dreaming, though her grandmother Zohara continues to check on her when she sleeps, to see if her eyelids move. Simone's husband, Jacqui (Yoram Toledano), is at the intersection of the women in the family: He likes Zohara's old-school mentality, and teams up with her to get Simone to abandon her restaurant, but at the same time, he does not want her to take her mother's place as a seer.

Things become even more complicated when Fannie (Hanna Azoulay Hasfari), Simone's estranged sister, arrives unexpectedly from Paris. Fannie arouses feelings and memories from the past - some good, such as awakening Simone's passion for cooking, others less so, as the possibility of an illicit relationship between her and Jacqui is hinted at. The tumult in the family slowly reveals Zohara's tragic history as a child bride, and places the conflict, which originated between Zohara and Fannie, as a struggle between tradition and modernity.

== Cast ==
- Zohara - Rita Shukron
- Simone - Esti Yerushalmi
- Zohar - Meital Gal Souissa
- Jacqui - Yoram Toledano
- Fannie - Hanna Azoulay Hasfari

== Production ==
The film is Azoulay's directorial debut. She based the story on her own mother's biography.

The film was produced by Green Productions-Corland Greenspan Ltd., with support from the Israel Film Fund.

The film was shot in colors associated with South American magic realism, to illustrate the connection Moroccan Jews have with their traditional mysticism.

== Release ==
The film premiered at the Haifa International Film Festival on September 22, 2013, followed by a screening at the International Women's Film Festival in Rehovot in October. It was released in theaters in Israel on May 1, 2014.

The film was subsequently screened at international film festivals, including:

- 13º Festival Internacional de Cine Judio Mexico - 2016
- 15th Festival of Israeli Cinema in Paris - 2015
- 17th Annual Lenore Marwil Jewish Film Festival (Detroit) - 2015
- 18th Annual New York Sephardic Jewish Film Festival - 2015
- 19th Annual Israeli Film Festival (Philadelphia) - 2015
- 20th Denver Jewish Film Festival - 2016
- 23rd Toronto Jewish Film Festival - 2015
- 25th Annual San Diego Jewish Film Festival - 2015
- 26th Donald M. Ephraim Palm Beach Jewish Film Festival - 2016
- Austin Jewish Film Festival - 2015
- Boston Jewish Film Festival - 2014
- Brussels Jewish Film Festival - 2016
- Houston Jewish Film Festival - 2015
- JPL Israeli Film Festival (Montreal) - 2017
- Santa Barbara Jewish Film Festival - 2016
- Silicon Valley Jewish Film Festival - 2015
- Tucson International Jewish Film Festival - 2015

=== United Nations screening ===
In March 2015, Azoulay was invited to screen Orange People at the United Nations, at the 59th session of the UN Commission on the Status of Women, as part of the International Women's Day events. She delivered a speech at the screening, condemning the practice of child brides, calling upon the UN to take action, and objecting to "whitewashing" the practice with the term "child marriage":

"You have the power to redefine the horrible act that is now being whitewashed as 'child marriage'.

The act of marriage is an act of mutual consent between two adults. When a 10-year old minor, who doesn't even know what it means to have sexual intercourse, is sold in exchange for a cow or a jeep, this is not marriage!

When a 12-year old girl who does not understand why she has to lie under an old man who hurts her, instead of playing catch with her friends, this is not marriage!

Ladies and Gentlemen! When all of this is taking place – this is not child-marriage – it is child rape!"

== Reception ==
The film received mostly positive reviews. At its debut at the International Women's Film Festival in Rehovot, the film was greeted with enthusiasm, and plucked the jury award for best film. For its screening at the International Jewish Film Festival in Mexico, Gonzalo Lira Galván praised the film for its effective portrayal of generational differences, and lauded Azoulay's balance between sentiment and analysis. He called the cast "an assembly of outstanding actresses", and complimented the cinematography as "inspiring". Lira concluded that in other hands, the film might have been more conventional, but in Azoulay's, it hits the exact right tone. Israeli film site Cinemascope raved about every aspect of the film, calling it "the surprise of the year", and citing, in particular, the film's authenticity, cinematography and music. Sociologist Hanna Herzog wrote of the film: "What captivates my heart in this film is love - love for culture, Moroccan heritage, family love, sisterly love, bodily love, erotic love for food, love between man and woman and equally love of this medium called cinema that allows Hannah Azoulay Hasfari to express amazing creativity and move between realism and surrealism, between reality and dream, between definitions of health and interpretations of illness."

The jury of the International Women's Film Festival in Rehovot, which awarded the film with the Best Narrative Feature award, wrote in the reasoning: "It is an imaginative and daring production, a cinematically spectacular film. An excellent work of historical memory saturated with painful memories. The film impressively restores a past era by sailing into dormant dreamscapes. Shukron's performance in the film is captivating."

On the other end of the spectrum, in his review of the film at its Toronto Jewish Film Festival screening, Michael Nazarewycz wrote that Hanna Azoulay Hasfari provided the film with "a good story foundation and a keen eye for blocking and framing shots, but she struggles to fully develop her ideas. This not only hinders the story, but it’s also harmful to the characters. By the film’s closing credits, not enough substance was left on-screen to make us care how it ends." In his ynet review, film critic Shmulik Duvdevani found Azoulay's return to her roots (both in terms of her interest in identity politics and in terms of her heritage) to be clichéd, especially given Azoulay's longstanding interest in these subjects, which he felt were better served in her earlier work, Sh'Chur, and the many films that have already used the medium of food to convey the emotions of the characters and tantalize the audience.

Critic Uri Klein wrote sorrowfully that it is impossible not to compare this work to Azoulay's work from two decades earlier, Sh'Chur, which he defines as one of the most important works in the history of Israeli cinema. As such, Orange People seems to him smaller and weaker, though he admits that it could be more apropos of the time it was released, and may be the beginning of new directions for the filmmaker, for whom he expresses great appreciation.

== Awards ==
Year	Award	Category	Nominee(s)	Result
2013	International Women's Film Festival in Rehovot	Jury Award, Best Narrative Film	Hanna Azoulay Hasfari; Gal Greenspan; Roi Kurland; Green Productions	Won
2016	Brussels Jewish Film Festival	Audience Award	Hanna Azoulay Hasfari	Won
2016	Brussels Jewish Film Festival	Coup de Couer	Hanna Azoulay Hasfari	Won
