= A Thousand and One Wives =

- DVD cover
- אלף נשותיו של נפתלי סימן טוב
- Directed by: Michal Bat-Adam
- Written by: Michal Bat-Adam
- Based on: ״אלף נשותיו של נפתלי סימן טוב״ by Dan Benaya-Serri
- Produced by: Effi Atad
- Starring: Yossi Pollak; Rita Jahanforuz; Nissim Azikri; Salim Daw; Jonathan Cherchi; Levana Finkelstein; Navah Ziv; Etti Grottes; Rivka Bahar; Geula Nuni; Varda Ben Hur; Tikva Aziz; Amira Polan; Shia Melamed; David Baruch; Ishai Meshulam; Tzipora Tzabari; Ada Tzabach
- Cinematography: Yoav Kosh
- Edited by: Yosef Grunfeld
- Music by: Alon Oleartchik
- Production companies: Israel Film Fund; Shani Films
- Release date: 1989 (Israel)
- Running time: 90 Minutes
- Country: Israel
- Language: Hebrew

A Thousand and One Wives (Hebrew: אלף נשותיו של נפתלי סימן טוב, tr. Elef Neshotav Shel Naftali Siman-Tov, literally "Naftali Siman-Tov's Thousand Wives") is a 1989 Israeli independent underground dramatic-historical art film written and directed by Michal Bat-Adam.

== Synopsis ==
In the Bukharim quarter, Jerusalem, during the 1920s, merchant Naftali Siman-Tov (Yossi Pollak) is a wealthy middle-aged widower, all of whose previous wives have died under mysterious circumstances. He fears getting married again due to believing that he is cursed. A local matchmaker, Arotchas (Salim Daw), aided by some elderly women, pressures him to remarry nonetheless. Eventually he marries Flora (Rita Jahanforuz), a naïve 24-year-old virgin. However, in order not to bestow his alleged curse upon her, he avoids direct intimate contact. Then Flora gets pregnant when a local textile salesman, Hamedian (Jonathan Cherchi), rapes her in his shop. Naftali, unable to bear the shame, becomes violent toward his young wife.

== Reception ==
Writing in Haaretz, critic Uri Klein opined that Rita Jahanforuz "adds to this film a significant amount of humanity and humor, and, she has a natural filmic presence," while Yedioth Ahronoth critic Nachman Ingber wrote that the film presents "a cornucopia of beautiful colors, [showing] a Jerusalem of towels, handsome tools, and, scarfs, really a wonderful parade of lots of tradition, customs, and, folklore, representing all Twelve Tribes of Israel, as if it were a beautiful exhibition by Maskit, with a well-spoken text," Davar critic Oshra Schwartz noted that the film's main achievement is its treatment of color and light, namely, that the cinematography "creates an almost perfect match between the view that can be seen through the vast Jerusalemite windows (in which the characters walk) and the large rooms within the old tastefully and colorfully decorated stone-made houses," and Al HaMishmar critic Yael Israel underscored that the film is Michal Bat-Adam's "best and most wholesome film" to date, due to its "reliable and reserved cinematic language creating a correct historical environment and utilizing glowing and careful acting."
