= Michal Bat-Adam =

Israeli film director, producer, screenwriter, actress and musician

- מיכל בת-אדם
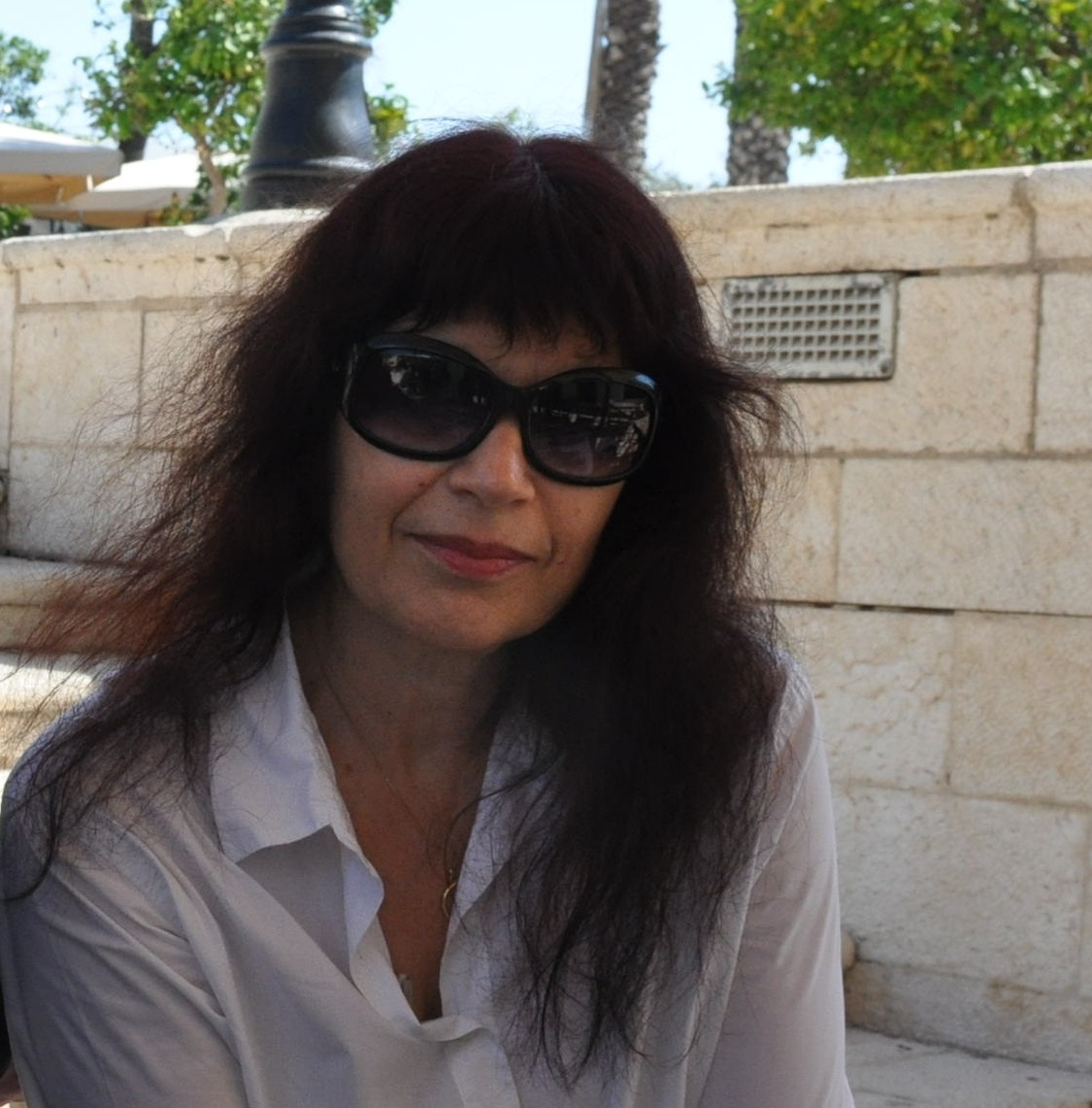
- Bat-Adam in 2011
- Born: Michal Breslavy; March 2, 1945 (age 81); Afula, Mandatory Palestine
- Occupations: Director, screenwriter, producer, actress, musician, teacher
- Years active: 1972–present
- Spouse: Moshé Mizrahi

Michal Bat-Adam (Hebrew: מיכל בת-אדם; born March 2, 1945) is an Israeli film director, producer, screenwriter, actress, and musician. Her films deal with complex and conflicted relationships, especially relationships within families. She also explores the line between sanity and mental illness. Many of these movies contain autobiographical elements.

As an actress, she has been noted for her work, especially for strong performances in the films of her husband, Moshé Mizrahi.

== Early life ==
Michal Bat-Adam was born in Afula, Israel to parents Yemima and Adam Rubin, who had immigrated from Warsaw in 1939. While she was a young child, the family lived in Haifa. Yemima suffered from mental illness, and had trouble caring for her family. When Michal was six and a half years old, she was sent to join her older sister Netta at Kibbutz Merhavia in the Harod Valley. While living there, both sisters changed their last name to Bat-Adam ("daughter of Adam"). At 17, Michal left the kibbutz and returned to care for her mother.

Originally wanting to be a musician, Bat-Adam studied at the Tel Aviv Academy of Music. After developing an interest in theater, she auditioned and was accepted to the Beit Zvi School of Performing Arts in Ramat Gan and turned her attention to acting. During her early acting career Bat-Adam performed in leading roles at the Habimah National Theater, the Cameri Theater and the Haifa Theater.

== Career ==
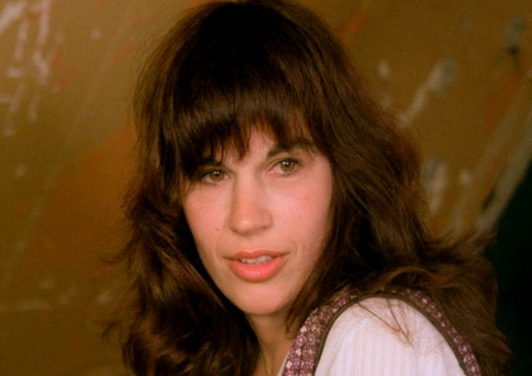
Bat-Adam, 1984

In 1972 Bat-Adam was cast in the title role in Moshe Mizrahi's film I Love You Rosa. The film was nominated for an Academy Award for Best Foreign Language Film and entered into the 1972 Cannes Film Festival. The role launched Bat-Adam's career as a film actress.

After a short-lived first marriage, Bat-Adam and Mizrahi married. She continued to act in several of Mizrahi's movies, including; The House on Chelouche Street (1973), Daughters, Daughters (1973), and Women (1996). She appeared in Mizrahi's Academy Award-winning French film, Madame Rosa in 1977.

Bat-Adam was living in Paris in the late 1970s when she began her career as a screenwriter and director. Her first film was a French-Israeli co-production, Moments (1979), released in the United States under the title Each Other. According to film scholar Gwendolyn Audrey Foster, Moments explores a lesbian relationship between two actresses in an "oblique, experimental manner", using cinematic devices such as memory flashbacks to construct and deconstruct their relationship. In addition to writing and directing, Bat-Adam cast herself in the film, which explores an intense, tempestuous friendship between two women. The film received favorable reviews, as well as a great deal of publicity, due to its frank depiction of the complicated relationship, including a scene in which she is in bed with actor Assi Dayan and the French actress Brigitte Catillon.

Following Moments, Bat-Adam worked on two films that have autobiographical themes, The Thin Line (1980), which recalls a mother struggling with mental illness, and Boy Meets Girl in 1982. This film, shot on Kibbutz Ma'ayan Tzvi, draws from Bat-Adam's memories of a young girl left by her parents at a kibbutz.

In the late 1980s, Bat-Adam directed two literary adaptations, The Lover (1986) and A Thousand and One Wives (1989). For television she worked on a drama, The Flight of Uncle Peretz (1993). She returned to autobiographical elements for later films, Aya: Imagined Autobiography (1994) and Maya (2010).

Although still active as a film-maker and actress, Bat-Adam now teaches at Tel Aviv University and Camera Obscura. She also performs poetry recitals and has recorded a CD of her reading, set to music.

== Work as actress ==
- Ha-Pritza Hagdola (1970)
- I Love You Rosa (1972) - Rosa
- The House on Chelouche Street (1973)
- Daughters, Daughters (1973) - Esther Alfandari
- Ha-Diber Ha-11 (1975)
- Rachel's Man (1975) - Rachel
- Madame Rosa (1977) - Nadine
- La fille de Prague avec un sac très lourd (1978) - Milena
- Moments (1979) - Yola
- Real Game (1980)
- Hanna K. (1983) - Russian woman
- Silver Platter (1983)
- The Ambassador (1984) - Tova
- Atalia (1984) - Atalia
- The Lover (1985) - Asia
- The Impossible Spy (1987, TV Movie) - Nadia Cohen
- Aya: Imagined Autobiography (1994) - Aya
- Women (1996) - Rebecca
- Rita Shem Zemani (2007)
- BeTipul (2008, TV Series) - Tami Savyon (final film role)

== As director ==
- Moments (1979)
- The Thin Line (1980)
- Boy Meets Girl (1982)
- The Lover (1986)
- A Thousand and One Wives (1989)
- The Deserter's Wife (1991)
- The Flight of Uncle Peretz (1993)
- Aya: Imagined Autobiography (1994)
- Love at Second Sight (1999)
- Life Is Life (2003)
- Maya (2010)
- Hila (2023)

== Awards ==
- Best Actress award of the Israel Film Institute: I Love You Rosa (1972) and Atalia (1984).
- Best Film, Best Director, Best Actress awards of the Israel Film Institute: Moments (1979) and The Thin Line (1980).
- Ophir Award for Lifetime Achievement (2019).
- Israel Prize for film art (2021).

== See also ==
- List of female film and television directors
- List of Israeli submissions for the Academy Award for Best Foreign Language Film
- List of LGBT-related films directed by women
