= Eilon Zarmon =

Israeli businessperson

- אילון זרמון
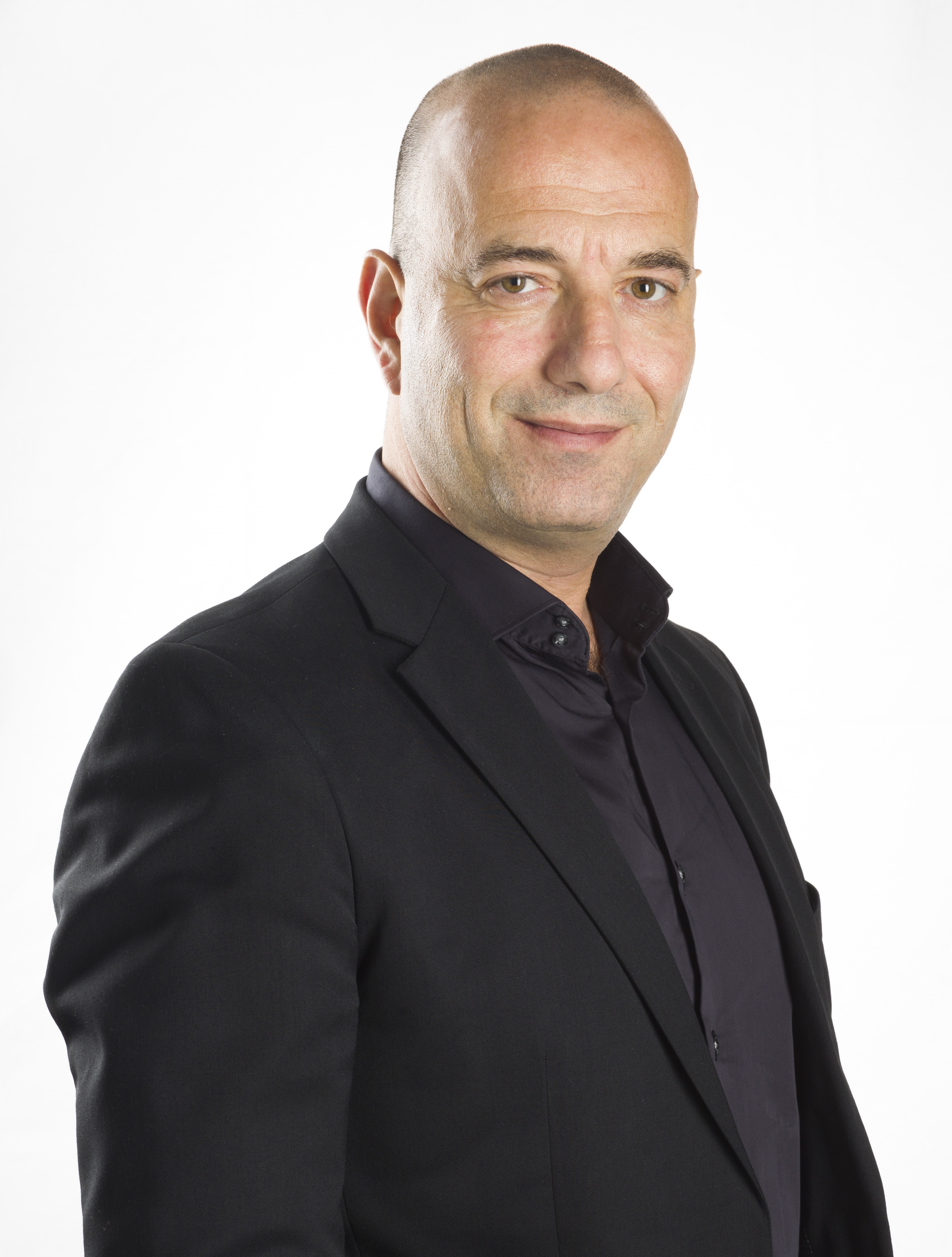
- Born: 1964 (age 61–62); Jerusalem, Israel
- Education: Jerusalem Academy of Music and Dance

Eilon Zarmon (Hebrew: אילון זרמון; born October 22, 1964) is an Israeli advertising executive, businessman, and musician.

== Biography ==
Eilon Zarmon was raised in Jerusalem, the son of a psychiatrist father and a mathematics teacher mother. At age 16, he completed a degree in musicology at the Jerusalem Academy of Music and Dance. He was also the principal clarinetist of the Young Israel Philharmonic Orchestra, the youngest musician in the history of the Philharmonic. Simultaneously, he founded a Jerusalem rock band called "Bli Bass" (Without Bass). He served in the IDF for four years as an officer in the role of company sergeant major in the 35th Paratroopers Brigade.

In 1990, at the age of 23, he established a creative office and worked with Africa Israel Investments, Shufersal, Migdal, and Kupat Holim Meuhedet. At age 26, he founded an advertising agency under his name. In 1999, at 33, Zarmon brought Hadar Goldman in as a partner. From 2003 to 2010, the firm ranked between 9th and 11th among advertising agencies in Israel. Among their clients were Best Buy, Fox, Citroën, AIG, Electra, Investec, Tower Records, Bulthaup, Pfizer, Walla! Communications Ltd, Burgeranch, Azrieli Center, Tara, Hed Arzi Music, Tadiran, Israel Electric Corporation, and Sony Mobile. The group was Israel's representative of DDB Worldwide since 2007. The agency was known for its provocative advertising, with numerous campaigns that were disqualified from broadcast by the Second Authority for Television and Radio, or petitions that were filed against them to the Supreme Court of Israel. In 2002, Haaretz newspaper supplement dedicated a cover story to Zarmon and Goldman, who turned advertising provocation into a method. In it, they attempted to position themselves as bold, young, liberal, and creative, using sexual and racist innuendos, while winning numerous advertising awards in the process. On the other hand, industry executives interviewed for the article criticized them for the crudeness and superficiality of Zarmon and Goldman's advertising, claiming that they tarnished the industry's reputation and rushed to the Supreme Court as if they were knights of free speech. In the same year, Ynet site also published an article that criticized the office methods, and Globes published a positive article about them. The magazine HaAyin HaShevi'it responded to the Haaretz article with its own piece, arguing that a reputable newspaper like Haaretz should not dedicate an article to a pair of provocative advertisers, thereby giving them a platform and promoting them. In February 2012, the partners split, and Zarmon bought Goldman's share.

In 2012, he established a start-up incubator. One of them, Mintai, signed an agreement with AOL. In 2024, he founded AdGPT, a startup that utilizes AI to create ads across various social media platforms. Its target clients are Small and medium enterprises.

Zarmon was part of Ehud Barak’s campaign team for Prime Minister of Israel in 1999 for the 1999 Israeli general election. In 2006, he managed the campaign of Meretz, which was then headed by Yossi Beilin for the 2006 Israeli legislative election. In 2012, he managed the campaign of Haim Amsalem, who headed the Am Shalem party for the 2013 Israeli legislative election.

His persona was featured in the TV comedy "Hakol Dvash", in which the advertiser Ron Harmon, played by Rami Heuberger, tells Yael Poliakov in a familiar bass voice and graphic detail what he will do to her, ending with "Get visual." In July 2025, he participated together with his daughter Dana Zarmon, an Influencer, in the sixth season of the show "HaMitbakh HaMenatzeiakh VIP" (the Israeli version of the show My Kitchen Rules).

== Personal life ==
Elon Zarmon lives in Tel Aviv. He is divorced from the designer and painter Drorit Barzilai, the partner of actor Guy Loel, is in a second relationship, and is the father of three daughters. In 2010, he released "Organism", an album in which he sang songs whose lyrics he wrote. In 2025, he published "The Blue Mountains", a children's book.
