= Geula Nuni =

Israeli actress

- גאולה נוני
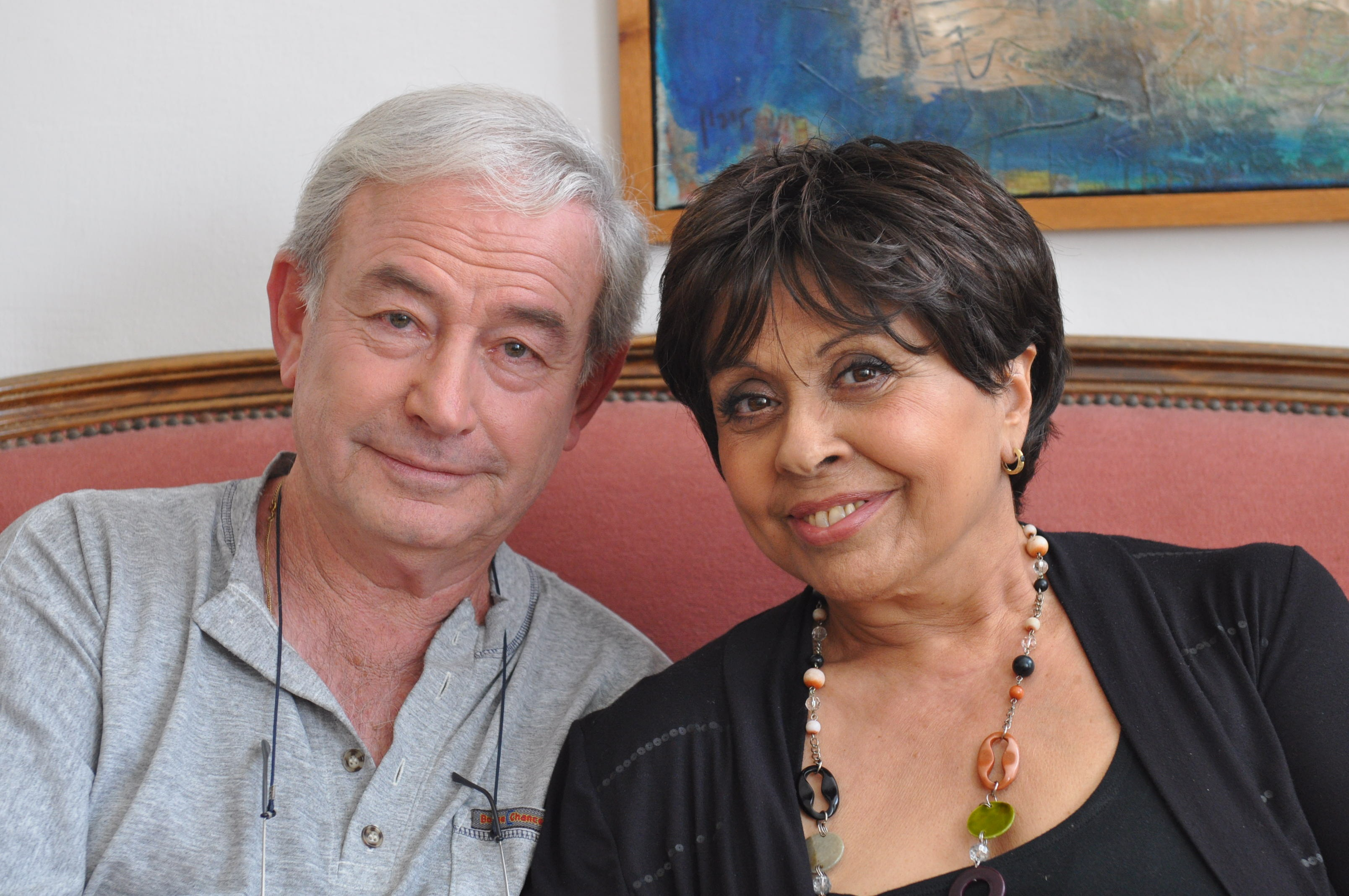
- Nuni (right) with Yoni Hamenachem in Through His Eyes (2011)
- Born: 9 June 1942; Ramat Gan, Mandatory Palestine
- Died: 10 November 2014 (aged 72); Tel Aviv, Israel
- Occupations: Actress; singer
- Years active: 1957–2011
- Children: 1

Geula Nuni (Hebrew: גאולה נוני; 9 June 1942 – 10 November 2014) was an Israeli actress and singer.

== Biography ==
Nuni was born in Ramat Gan in a family of three daughters to a Yemeni-Jewish father and an Austrian-Jewish mother. She made her first stage appearance at the age of 15 and first appeared in the 1960 film I Like Mike. In 1961, she served in the Nahal Troupe, after which she left for Europe where she studied the works of Mary Wigman. Upon returning to Israel, Nuni worked in the Habima Theatre and appeared in the stage adaptation of Irma La Douce which boosted her popularity.

Nuni's most famous film appearance was in the 1964 film Sallah Shabati starring Chaim Topol. She performed a song in the film with her on-screen partner Arik Einstein. Nuni's other films have included Charlie and a Half and A Thousand and One Wives. In 1971, Nuni moved to Vienna and pursued various projects and starred in a stage production about the Dreyfus affair.

Upon Nuni's return to Israel, she acted in a short-lived 1994 sitcom with Ze'ev Revach and acted in various television shows until 2010. Nuni also had a career as a voice actress. Her most notable voice dubbing role was performing the Hebrew voice of Fanny in Casper Meets Wendy. She retired in 2011.

=== Personal life ===
Nuni married twice. Her second husband was the mime artist Samy Molcho. She also had one daughter, Sharon and three grandchildren.

== Death ==
Nuni died of cancer at Ichilov Hospital on 10 November 2014, at the age of 72. She was interred at Nahalat Yitzhak Cemetery.
