= The Thin Line (1980 film) =

1980 film

- על חבל דק
- Directed by: Michal Bat-Adam
- Written by: Michal Bat-Adam
- Produced by: Avi Kleinberger, Gidi Amir
- Starring: Gila Almagor, Alex Peleg, Liat Pensky
- Cinematography: Nurith Aviv
- Edited by: Tzion Abrahamian
- Release date: 1980
- Running time: 94 minutes
- Country: Israel
- Language: Hebrew

The Thin Line (Hebrew: על חבל דק, translit. Al Hevel Dak) is a 1980 Israeli drama art film written and directed by Michal Bat-Adam. The film was selected as the Israeli entry for the Best Foreign Language Film at the 53rd Academy Awards, but was not accepted as a nominee.

The film also won three Israeli Film Center Awards in 1980 (Best Film, Best Director – Michal Bat-Adam, Best Actress – Gila Almagor) and three Kinor David Awards in 1981 (Best Film, Best Director – Michal Bat-Adam, Best Actress – Gila Almagor). Gila Almagor plays the unstable mother, a role similar to her performance in the 1988 film Aviya's Summer.

== Plot ==
The Alon family consists of four members: Pola (Gila Almagor), the mother; Nadav (Alex Peleg), the father; Maya (Aya Verov), the eldest daughter; and Nili (Liat Pensky), the youngest daughter.

Nadav, a photographer who owns a photo shop, frequently takes pictures of the family. Pola, however, struggles with managing the household. She is often erratic in her behavior, fluctuating between periods of cheerfulness and energy, and times when she is withdrawn, spending long hours in bed, muttering to herself, crying, and forgetting household tasks.

Maya is sent to a kibbutz, while Nili stays home to care for Pola. In this role reversal, Nili takes on the responsibility of looking after her mother. Nadav, feeling helpless, spends long hours at his shop.

The family doctor, Dr. Gerber (Avner Hazazah), persuades Nadav to admit Pola to a psychiatric institution. During the summer, Nadav sends Nili to the kibbutz and, in her absence, takes Pola to the institution, where she is received by the doctor (Yitzhak Chavis) and the head nurse (Miri Fabian). They instruct Nadav not to contact Pola for a few weeks.

As Pola’s mental state deteriorates, she becomes violent, requiring physical restraint and electroshock therapy. Nadav tells the daughters that Pola is resting with relatives in Jerusalem and does not inform them of her hospitalization.

When Nili returns home from the kibbutz, she discovers the truth about Pola’s whereabouts. Nili attempts to care for her mother, even treating lice that Pola contracted at the institution. Despite her efforts, Pola's condition worsens, and Dr. Gerber administers a sedative, sending Pola back to the psychiatric institution.

== Cast ==
- Gila Almagor as Paula
- Alexander Peleg as Nadav (as Alex Peled)
- Liat Pansky as Nili
- Aya Veirov as Maya
- Avner Hizkiyahu as Dr. Greber
- Svetlana Mazovetskaya as Dressmaker (as S. Mazovetzkaya)
- S. Greenspan as Degarit
- Kina L. Hanegbi as Bina
- Irit Mohr-Alter as Zila
- Miri Fabian as Nurse

== See also ==
- List of submissions to the 53rd Academy Awards for Best Foreign Language Film
- List of Israeli submissions for the Academy Award for Best Foreign Language Film
