= Back to Roots =

1994 Hong Kong film by Raymond Leung

- Film poster
- Directed by: Raymond Leung
- Starring: Radium Cheung
- Release date: 1994
- Running time: 98 minutes
- Country: Hong Kong
- Language: Cantonese

Back to Roots (歸土, Gui tu) is a 1994 Hong Kong drama film directed by Raymond Leung. It was entered into the 45th Berlin International Film Festival.

== Cast ==
- Radium Cheung
