= Shlomo Bar-Shavit =

Israeli actor (1928–2019)

- שלמה בר-שביט
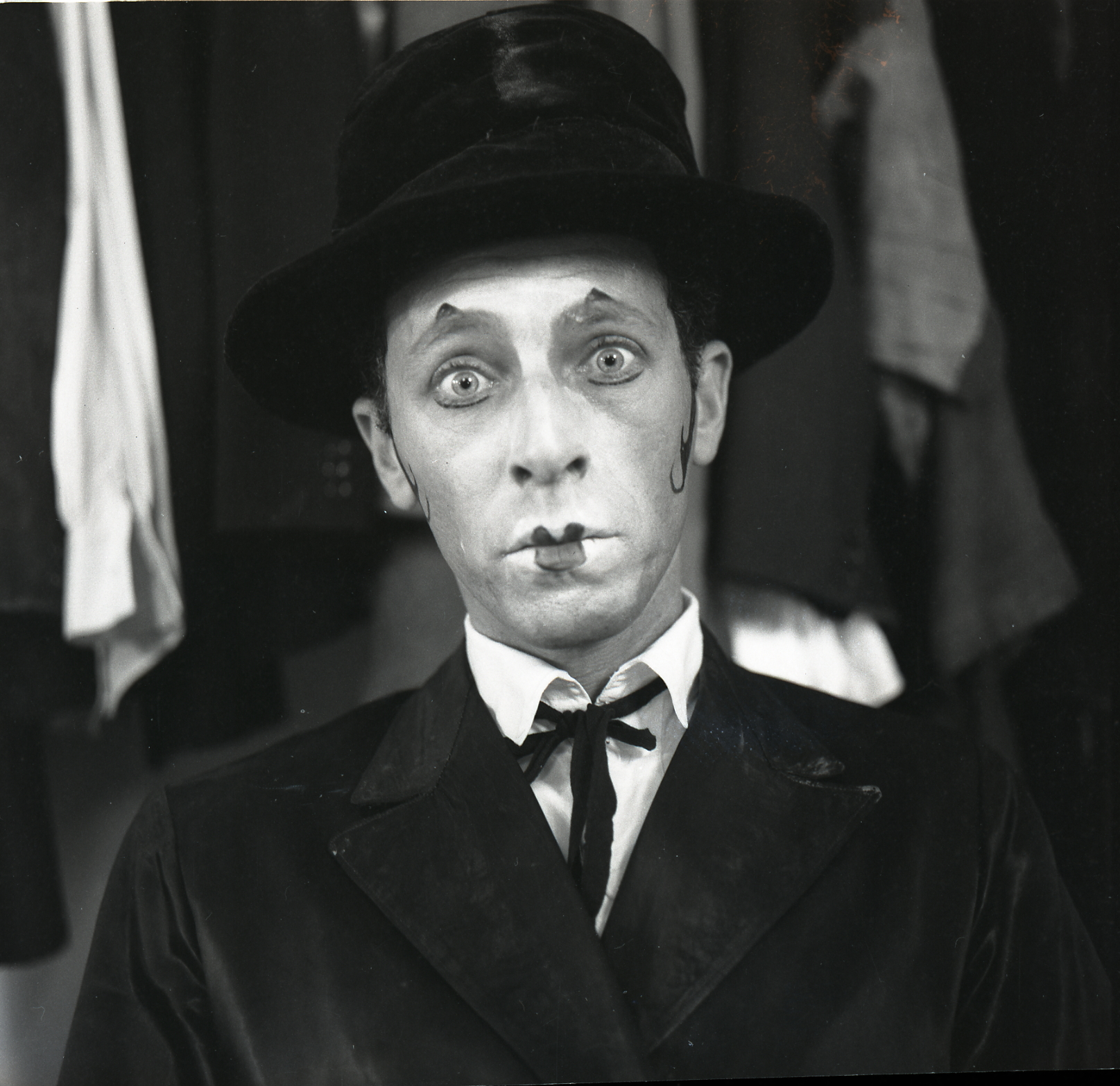
- Bar-Shavit in 1965
- Born: Shlomo Friedman; 7 December 1928; Jerusalem, Mandatory Palestine
- Died: 8 September 2019 (aged 90); Tel Aviv, Israel
- Occupations: Actor; voice actor; theatre director; artistic director; writer
- Years active: 1947–2019
- Children: 3
- Relatives: Shlomo Elyashiv (great-grandfather)

Shlomo Bar-Shavit (Hebrew: שלמה בר-שביט; 7 December 1928 – 8 September 2019) was an Israeli actor, voice actor and theatre director.

== Biography ==
Born in Jerusalem, his father was a construction worker and his mother, who was the granddaughter of Shlomo Elyashiv, was a nurse at the Shaare Zedek Medical Center. When Bar-Shavit was four years old, he was abandoned by his parents after they separated and he spent a majority of his childhood in 13 different foster institutions and kibbutzim including Mishmar HaEmek and Givat Brenner. At the age of nine, Bar-Shavit decided that he wanted to become an actor after witnessing a play that one of the foster homes organised. He performed in his first play in a kibbutz at 16. In 1946, he moved to Tel Aviv and enrolled in the acting school of the Habima Theatre. He subsequently became a stage actor at the Habima Theatre.

In 1948, Bar-Shavit enlisted in the Israel Defense Forces and joined the Chizbatron entertainment troupe. He performed for soldiers during the 1948 Arab-Israeli War. From 1949 onwards, Bar-Shavit acted in many Habima plays, which includes Othello, The Taming of the Shrew, Peer Gynt, Kazablan, Irma La Douce, Richard III and many more. He received mixed reviews in his performance in a play about the 1948 war. He also once received uproar from some audience members, including Holocaust survivors, because of his portrayal of Josef Mengele in a play about the Holocaust, and his home had to be guarded by police for fear of him being attacked. For a number of years, Bar-Shavit was on the Habima's management team and served as an artistic director and in 1999, he directed a theatrical adaptation of The Eternal Husband by Fyodor Dostoevsky.

In cinema and television, Bar-Shavit made his debut screen appearance in the 1964 film Bring the Girls to Eilat. He also starred in the 1970 film Lupo! directed by Menahem Golan. From 2009 until 2011, he had a recurring role as the father of the central protagonist in the television series Polishuk and he appeared in the season 9 episode premiere of Life is Not Everything. As a voice actor, he dubbed the voices of characters into the Hebrew language. These include Rafiki in The Lion King films, Jasper in One Hundred and One Dalmatians, Fagin in Oliver & Company and he also served as the voice of Dumbledore in the first two Harry Potter films before he was replaced by Albert Cohen.

In 2001, Bar-Shavit released an autobiography. Three years later, a documentary was released detailing his life.

=== Personal life ===
Bar-Shavit was married and had one son and two daughters. He and his family resided in Tel Aviv.

== Death ==
On 8 September 2019, Bar-Shavit died in Tel Aviv Sourasky Medical Center from complications of pneumonia at the age of 90. Prior to his death, he used a wheelchair and was battling a variety of health issues, including Parkinson's disease.
