= Hanna Azoulay Hasfari =

Israeli actor and screenwriter

Hanna Azoulay-Hasfari
- חנה אזולאי-הספרי
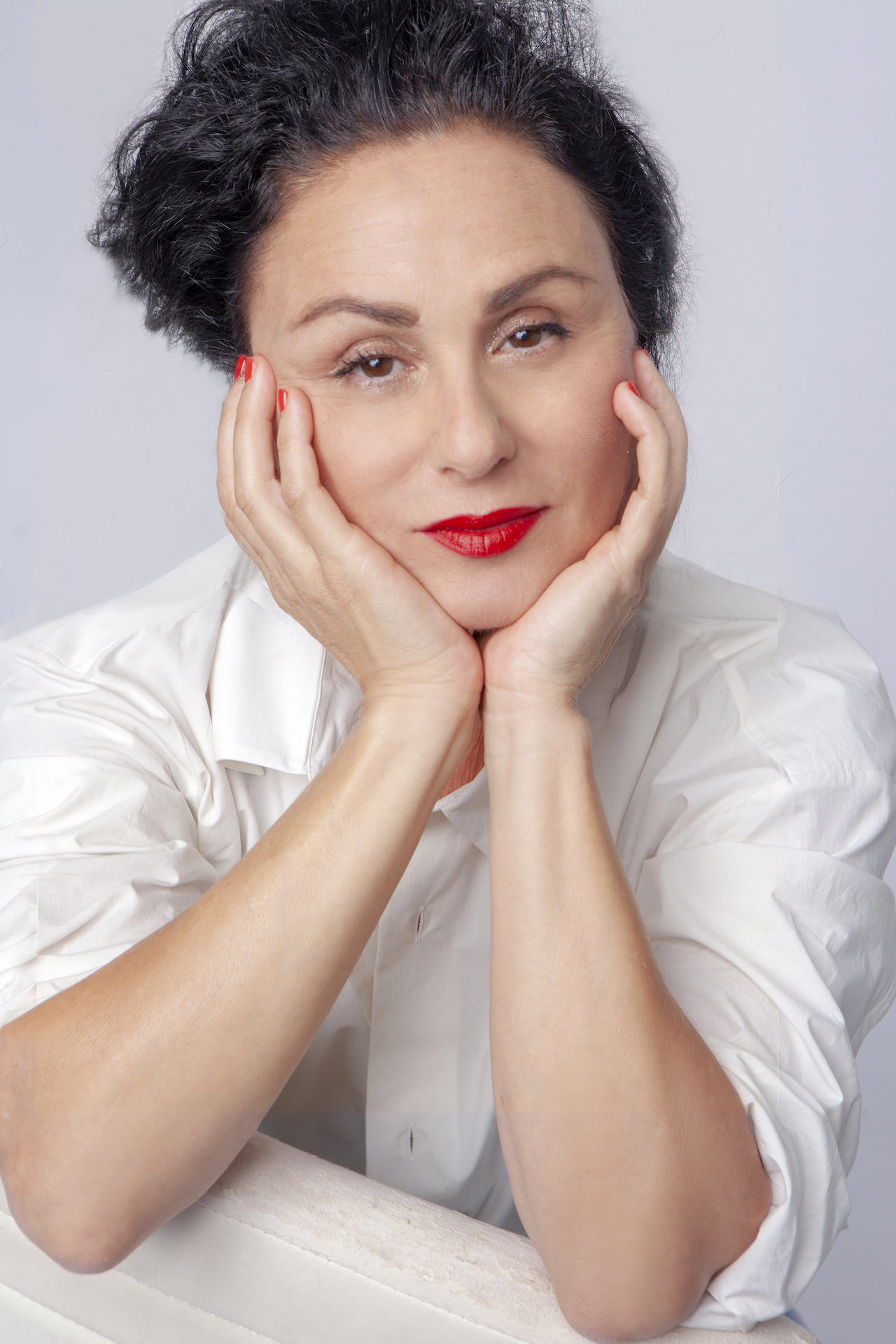
- Azoulay-Hasfari in 2019
- Born: June 29, 1960 (age 66); Beersheba, Israel
- Known for: "Levana" Lovesick on Nana Street "Racheli" Sh'Chur "Solly Barzel" Polishuk "Nadia" Nadia "Gila Asulin" The Arbitrator (Israeli TV series)
- Notable work: Plays: "Matchmaking Virgins" (Cameri Theater), "Selichot"; "Mimuna" (Beit Lessin Theater)
- Spouse: Shmuel Hasfari
- Awards: Ophir Award 1995 "Chamber of Critics" Award

Hanna Azoulay-Hasfari (Hebrew: חנה אזולאי-הספרי; born June 29, 1960) is an Israeli actress, screenwriter, playwright, film director and a two-time winner of the Ophir Award. She is a women's rights activist, and has dedicated her career to promoting awareness regarding social justice issues and cultural diversity. In 2015, she was invited to speak at the United Nations headquarters in New York, in honor of International Women's Day, where she presented a screening of her film Orange People, in condemnation of child marriage.

== Early life ==
Azoulay-Hasfari was born on June 29, 1960, in Beersheba, Israel. Both of her parents immigrated to Israel from Morocco. She studied at residential school called “Mae Boyar” in Jerusalem. Upon completion of her high school education, Azoulay-Hasfari served her compulsory service in the Israeli Defense Force (IDF) in the military theater. After her military service she went on to study theater and acting at Tel Aviv University.

== Theater ==
In the early 1980s, Azoulay-Hasfari left Tel Aviv University. She became one of the founding members of the Simple Theater Group, a multi-cultural team that enabled artists to express their cultural worldview and to become the central focus of their projects. The theater group focused on representing the real experiences of people within local history, such as the first generation of holocaust survivors, and second generation of Mizrachim in Israel. Azoulay-Hasfari worked on all aspects of this theater group: She participated in fundraising, screenwriting, production and acting.

While working with the theater group, Azoulay-Hasfari performed in many plays, including Tashmad (1983), which won Best Play at the annual Acco Festival; Azoulay-Hasfari won Best Actress. However, after many years of success, The Simple Theater Group dissolved, and Azoulay-Hasfari moved on to mainstream theater and cinema.

Azoulay-Hasfari appeared in numerous stage productions in leading theaters in Israel, including the Cameri Theater, the Haifa Theatre, Be'er Sheva Theater and Beit Lessin Theater. She has acted in many key roles including Alma in Tashmad (Samuel Hasfari); Julie in Pack of Lies (Hugh Whitmore); Amelia in The House of Bernarda Alba (Garcia Lorca); Mary & Huda A Trumpet in the Wadi (an adaptation of Sami Michael's book by Samuel Hasfari); various roles in Yellow Time (adaptation of David Grossman’s project); various roles in The King (Samuel Hasfari); Puck in Midsummer Night's Dream (Shakespeare); Miranda in The Tempest (Shakespeare); Shulamit in Nathanya (Shmuel Hasfari); and Rachel in Valentine (Rami Danon and Amnon Levy).

She has also written numerous plays, such as:

- Match Void (Cameri Theater, Red Lion Theater in London);
- Yom Kippur (Day of Atonement; Beit Lessin, the Jewish Theatre, NOTTARA theater in Bucharest, Romania and Boston Center for the Arts, Satu Mare theater in Romania);
- Mimuna (Beit Lessin)
- Dina (Dimona Theater, Boston Center for the Arts).

In 2019, Hanna has been awarded the America-Israel Cultural Foundation (AICF) Culture & Arts Award (Theater category).

== Film ==
One of Azoulay's first movie scripts was Sh'Chur (1994), which was directed by Shmuel Hasfari. It is a semi-autobiographical story of a Moroccan family immigrating to Israel, and it received international awards and recognition. Sh’Chur has also been included as required material for film studies, as well as anthropology and sociology coursework, and women's studies.

After the successful completion of her work writing the screenplay for "Sh’chur”, she was one of the founders of the Mizrahi Democratic Rainbow Coalition, and then later took a year to return to her studies, where she focused on sociology and anthropology. It was at this time she found an interest in her own heritage, and she came to the realization that the roles she was required to play in mainstream cinema did not necessarily represent real characters. As a result, she decided to learn about her own family history and began writing screenplays and working on movies that tell about the lives of invisible women, and incorporate untold stories that revolve around social justice issues.

Most recently, Azoulay-Hasfari produced, wrote, directed and acted in her film called Orange People, which is based on the biography of Azoulay's mother. Orange People was awarded the Jury Award for Best Film in 2013 at the International Women's Film Festival, in Rehovot. As a result of the success of this film, Azoulay was asked to speak at the United Nations Headquarters in New York in honor of International Women's Day.

Azoulay-Hasfari has acted in many Israeli films, including Rage and Glory (Daphna), Nadia (title role), Dead End Street (Ilana), The Quarry (Esther), Girls (Shuli Hazan), Sh'Chur (Heli), Lovesick on Nana Street (Levana), Schwartz Dynasty (Ronit), Shiva (Simona), with Ronit Elkabetz.

She also acted in several American films, including Delta Force 3: The Killing Game and The Human Shield.

== Television ==
Azoulay-Hasfari was the main creator for the documentary series Proletariat and My Little Empire, which encourages the empowerment of women through entrepreneurship. She has also written scripts for several episodes of the TV series Jerusalem Mix.

Azoulay-Hasfari's many appearances in Israeli television series include:

- Esti HaMekho'eret
- First Degree Love
- Braids and The Arbitrator
- Polishuk
- False Flag (Hulu)

She has also acted in several German Television series.

== Social Agenda ==
Azoulay is a Mizrahi artist and social activist. She utilizes issues concerning gender, identity and social status from Israeli society to inspire unique characters, and develop stories that reflect real lives and social injustices. Examples of her work that bring light to social justice issues are films such as Sh’chur, Orange People, Proletariat, and My Little Empire, which highlight struggles experienced by marginalized women.

In March 2015 the film Orange People was screened at the international conference for women's status at the United Nations Headquarters in New York. Azoulay delivered a speech addressed to the international community condemning the phenomenon of young girls being forced into marriage around the world.

Azoulay is one of the founders of an NGO called The Mizrahi Democratic Rainbow New-Discourse, which works on social justice issues through the means of media and alternative performances.

She continues to work on social justice issues as a pro bono chairperson of Beit Ruth, an Israeli organization focused on providing at-risk girls and young women opportunities to excel academically, emotionally and physically. She is responsible for campaigning, fundraising, and negotiating financial and policy agreements within the public and private sector.

In 2018 Azoulay received an honorary degree from the Open University of Israel for developing the legacy of the Mizrahim in Israel and for contributing to women's status and to Sepharadic women in Israel through her art.

In 2018, Azoulay became one of the founders of the Gesher political party, led by Orly Levy-Abekasis.

== Personal life ==
Azoulay-Hasfari is currently living in Jaffa, Israel. She is married to the playwright and director Shmuel Hasfari, with whom she has three children.

== Awards ==
| Year | Award | Category | Nominated work |
|---|---|---|---|
| 1987 | Ophir Award | Best Actress | Nadia |
| 1994 | Ophir Award | Best Film | Lovesick on Nana Street |
| 1995 | Ophir Award | Best Film | Sh'Chur |
| 1995 | Berlin International Film Festival | Special Mention | Sh'Chur |
| 1995 | Festroia International Film Festival | Best Screenplay | Sh'Chur |
| 2008 | Jerusalem Film Festival | Best Actress | Shiva (2008 film) |
| 2008 | Chamber of Critics | Best Actress | Shiva (2008 film) |
| 2013 | Jury Award, International Women's Film Festival In Rehovot | Best Film | Orange People |
| 2016 | Brussels Jewish Film Festival | View | |
| 2018 | Golden Age | For positive portrayal of Mizrahi characters in Israeli cinema and TV, and for her social contribution to citizens in peripheral areas. | |
| 2019 | ICA (Israeli Culture & Arts Awards, by the America-Israel Cultural Foundation) | Theater; inaugural award recipient | |

== External References ==
- Hanna Azoulay-Hasfari at IMDb
- Hanna Azoulay-Hasfari at the Israeli Dramatists Website
- Mizrahi Democratic Rainbow Coalition Official Website
- "Beit Rut" Official Website
- Azoulay's acceptance speech for her 2018 "Golden Age" award(In Hebrew)
