= Wisdom of the Pretzel =

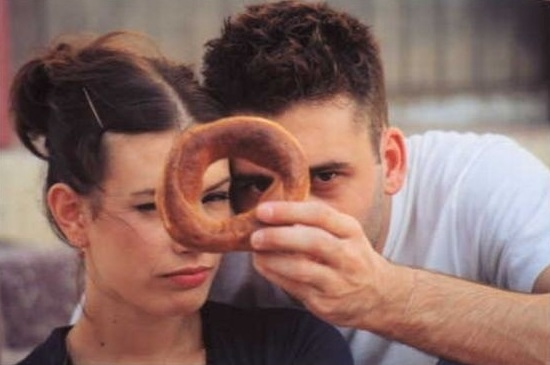
- Directed by: Ilan Heitner
- Written by: Ilan Heitner
- Produced by: Ilan Heitner; Shay Werker
- Starring: Guy Loel; Osnat Hakim; Yoram Zacs; Beni Avni; Shai Werker; Orit Sher
- Cinematography: Oded Kirma
- Edited by: Joel Alexis
- Music by: Ophir Leibovitch
- Release date: 2002
- Running time: 101 minutes
- Country: Israel
- Language: Hebrew

Wisdom of the Pretzel (original Hebrew title: Hochmat HaBeygale) is a 2002 Israeli comedy film directed by Ilan Heitner. Wisdom of the Pretzel is a film adaptation of a best-selling Israeli novel.

== Plot ==
The main character, Golan, is a 20 something year old student nearing the end of his college studies, and is having a hard time deciding about his future. He sees no point in getting a job, finding a wife or stopping the endless round of parties. After a blind date with his best friend's quirky sister, he begins to question his life. Golan then begins a personal journey that has him challenge everything he has ever believed, about himself, about love and about the nature of life in contemporary Israel.

== Cast ==
Actor Name	Character
Guy Loel	Golan
Osnat Hakim	Dekel Kahana
Beni Avni	Betzel
Yoram Zaks	Guy "Goya" Kahana
Shay Varker	Yos
Meital Timsit	Sharon
Moriel Git Goldstein	Dina
Alma Zuck	Galit
Orit Shar	Re'ut
Nir Levi	Dekel's ex-partner
Tzvi Sulton	Golan's father
Naor Tzion	Man in the elevator
Sofi Tzedaka	Woman in the elevator
Orit Fix	Bombshell at the university

== Reception ==
Wisdom of the Pretzel was nominated for nine Israeli Film Academy Awards.

== Production ==
After the success of his book Hochmat HaBagel (which had sold 100,000 copies by then), Ilan Heitner decided to study filmmaking in New York. During his studies, he purchased a Sony PD150, a small and inexpensive DV camera, the most basic among professional cameras, which he used for his film school exercises. Upon graduating, he decided to write a screenplay based on his bestselling book, which had continued to gain popularity.

Heitner was confident that upon returning to Israel, he would find investors to produce the film and bring change to local cinema. However, due to his lack of directing experience, no investors were interested. Left with no choice, Heitner invested $50,000 of his own money to produce the film himself, with actors agreeing to a deferred payment model—working without pay until the film generated profits. Due to budget constraints, the film was shot with the camera Heitner had purchased in New York, an unconventional decision at the time, during the transition from film to digital. The movie was filmed in DVCAM format and later underwent a blowup conversion from digital to film.

Throughout the production, Heitner faced challenges due to his inexperience in directing, leading to the resignation of the lead cinematographer. As a result, Heitner had to shoot the remaining scenes himself. He later recounted that many of the scenes he filmed were accidentally deleted or not recorded at all.

After 18 days of filming, he traveled to Greece to edit the film with Joel Alexis (Gett, Ran Quartet, Lovesick on Nana Street). With the rough cut, Heitner attempted to sell the film to Israeli broadcasters. After a long process, the movie was purchased by HOT (Israel) for $250,000. From the profits, Heitner was able to pay his crew their wages.

== Soundtrack ==
The film's theme song, Sof HaKatzir (End of Summer), was written by Micha Shitrit, composed and performed by Micha Shitrit and Berry Sakharof.

Additionally, the following songs appear in the film:

- I Try – Macy Gray
- Bossa Nova Katan – Rami Fortis and Shlomi Brachah
- Holechet Le'ibud – Danny Shperling
- Nosea Levad – Raash
