= Guy Loel =

Israeli actor (born 1971)

- גיא לואל
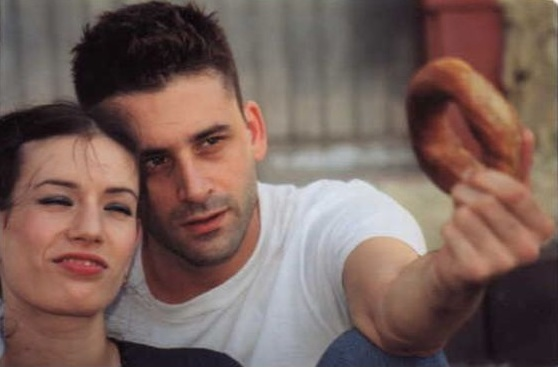
- Wisdom Of The Pretzel beigalepic
- Occupation: Actor

Guy Loel (Hebrew: גיא לואל; born December 4, 1971) is an Israeli actor.

== Biography ==
Guy Loel was born and raised in Ramat Gan. Already at Ohel Shem High School, he participated in a play "מתנערים" directed by David Steinberg. In the IDF he first served in the Artillery Corps and two years later moved to the IDF Theater. In 1993–1996 he studied acting at Beit Zvi.

Participated in Plays on Habima Theatre: "The Mandrake", "Catch 22", "The Boys Next Door", "Improvisation Games", and "Stage Stories". Beit Lessin Theater: "News Flash", Scapino and "Weekly Weekend with Tom". Cameri Theater: " Caviar and Lentils". Beersheba Theater : " Play It Sam". At the same time, he took part in plays at the Library Theater: "Our Boys" and "A Hatful of Rain". Participate in plays for children and youth "למשל שועל", "Mr. Zuta and the Apple Tree," "Election Jungle," "Danger," and "Tommy's Journey."

In 1999, he first starred in Alon Zingman 's film Herzl's Toothache, which won the Volgin Award. In 2000, he played in the drama "The Other Woman " alongside Gila Almagor, Yona Elian, Avital Abergil and more. In 2002, he was cast for the lead role in the movie "Wisdom of the Pretzel", in 2006 he participated in the films "Out of Sight", "Good under Good", "As if nothing happened" and in the short film "Strangers".

On television, Loel participated in the Telenovela "Telenovela Ba'am", in which he portrayed the self-made television channel director Benny Kaiserman, the "Ha-Alufa" in which he portrayed Kaiserman's brother, sports broadcaster Bear Kaiser, who lost his sanity, Presenter the "Sex Survey" The big "on YTV channel in 2005. In 2007, Telenovella participated in" Dolls ", in which he played the character of Moish, a fashion event producer who is Homosexuality in the closet. In 2008 he played in" חשופים", where he played news presenter Eitan Arazi. Participate in the three seasons in the TV series "המובילים" in Logi channel, and the series "Ha-Ex Ha-Mitologi", and "Esrim plus” in Educational Television.

In 2009 off the game show based on the competition between celebrities "God willing", and began to play the role of Kozo Avital television series "Polishuk". In 2010 he played in the sitcom "Kan Garim Bekef" together with Nati Kluger Daniel Moreshset, Maayan Aloni and Tony Berman in Channel 10. In 2011 started guide with Israel Aharoni the cooking show "Israeli cooks." Loel has also participated in several advertising campaigns, including the National Israel Anti-Drug Authority, Hamashbir Lazarchan and הפניקס חברה לביטוח.

In 2012, he played a guest role in the "Summer Days" series and in the "Greenhouse" series in the role of Rosen's rebel Prime Minister in 2014, played by Ben Zeidman, a married couple with two children, in the "Amamiyot" series. In August, the series " Good Cop " came up, playing the role of Jacob "Rabbi" Policeman and Commander of Denny, played by Yuval Samo. In 2015 Loel played in the series "תמר הבלשית וקפטן יום שלישי", and in the series "Kings", where a permanent man who betrays his wife plays. Also playing in the "Elisha" series, which airs on the children's channel, in the role of the entitled "Great" lawyer who wants to prevent Elisha (Yuval Samo) from finishing sixth grade and to inherit it.

In 2018 Loel participated in several episodes of "Gav Ha'Uma." In the same year, he participated in the "טרנינג" situation comedy in the character's name, and also participated in the "בית הכלבים" series that year in the name of Yair.

In 2019 Loel participated in several episodes in the "Kfula" series as a cop. That year, he played in the third season of "The Good Cop" series and released the movie "Finita La Commedia" with his participation.

Ahead of the 22nd Knesset legislative election, he participated in the campaign "המרכז הישראלי להעצמת האזרח" that called on politicians to present bright positions to the public.

Loel was celebrity branding of "Phoenix" insurance.

He is married to Drorit Barzilai, a designer and painter, and ex-wife of the advertising executive Eilon Zarmon.

== Select filmography ==
=== Film ===
- Wisdom of the Pretzel (2002, as Goan)
- Out of Sight (2006, as Gidi)
- The Piter Shmychel Project (2008, as Maccabi Haifa)

=== Television ===
- The Promise (2011 serial, 4 episodes, as Avram Klein)
- Amamiyot (2014, 6 episodes, as Ben Zeidman)
- Polishuk (2009–15, 37 episodes, as 'Kozzo' Avital)
- The Good Cop (2015–17, 30 episodes, as Rabbi)
