= Michael Kutza =

American filmmaker and the founder of the Chicago International Film Festival

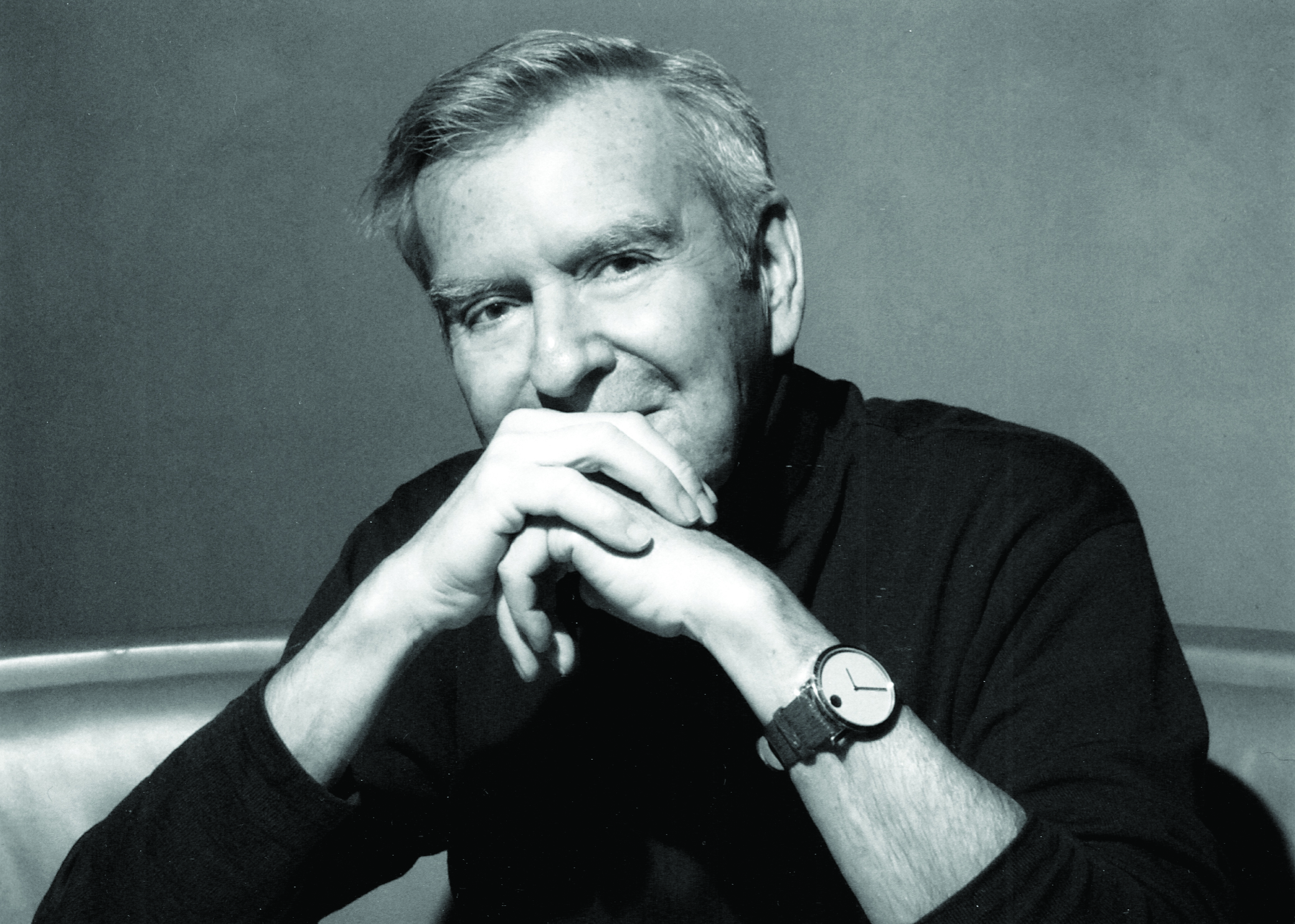
- Born: November 28, 1942 (age 83); Chicago, IL, US
- Years active: 1964–present
- Known for: Founder of the Chicago International Film Festival, film, film criticism, graphic design
- Website: michaelkutza.com

Michael Kutza (born November 28, 1942) is a filmmaker, graphic designer and the founder of the Chicago International Film Festival. In addition, he has been involved in other film festivals internationally, in such diverse locations as Taormina, Tehran, Moscow, Manila, Bogota, Los Angeles, Cannes, Berlin and Jerusalem, and has served as an advisor to a number of other festivals, including the Berlin International Film Festival and the Locarno International Film Festival.

In 1977 he was a member of the jury at the 10th Moscow International Film Festival. From 1979 to 1991, he served Italian journal Il Tempo as its American film correspondent. He has received numerous honors for cultural achievements.

== Early life and education ==
Kutza was born Michael Joseph Kutza Jr. on November 28, 1942, in Chicago, IL, son of Dr. Michael J. Kutza Sr. (born 1897) and Dr. Theresa Kutza (née Felicetti, born 1899), both medical doctors. He is of mixed Polish and Italian descent. While traveling and attending medical conferences, Kutza's mother would film 16mm home movies, which Kutza credits as the start of his interest in film.

As a child, through a patient of his mother, Kutza would visit the Chicago nightclub Chez Paree, where he became acquainted with Chicago Sun Times columnist Irv Kupcinet, who would later become his mentor. In 1953, Kutza attended a screening of the widescreen Cinerama documentary film This Is Cinerama at the Eitel’s Palace Theatre in downtown Chicago (now Cadillac Palace Theatre). Kutza credits this event with having heightened his interest in film production and presentation.

Under familial pressure to study medicine, Kutza enrolled in the pre-med program of Loyola University, and obtained a freelance job as a cameraman for WGN-TV. Kutza later left Loyola and moved his studies to Northwestern University. After leaving Northwestern, Kutza obtained a bachelor's degree in biology and psychology from Roosevelt University. He then enrolled in postgraduate studies at the Illinois Institute of Technology, where he studied design. In its earliest years, the festival was reliant on financial support from Kutza's parents, who offered help with a promise that Kutza would remain interested in continuing his medical studies.

== Chicago International Film Festival ==
In 1964, at age 22, Michael Kutza founded the Chicago International Film Festival. Kutza's mentor Irv Kupcinet put him in touch with Chicago silent film actress Colleen Moore, with whom Kutza became closely acquainted. Moore offered Kutza her support and helped co-found the festival.

Kutza served as the festival's artistic director until 2016. In 2017, Kutza became the president and CEO of Cinema/Chicago, the Festival's parent organization.

Through its early years, Kutza personally screened and selected the films that would be shown at the Festival. It was during this period, in 1967, that Kutza viewed and selected for its world-premiere I Call First, the first film of director Martin Scorsese, which would later be expanded and rereleased as Who's That Knocking at My Door. Kutza has been an outspoken proponent of foreign-language films.

== Honors ==
Kutza has received a number of honors for his cultural achievements. Among them, in 1972, Kutza received the Silver Lion Award at the Venice Film Festival, and in 1978, the Chicago Sun-Times' "Exceptional Contribution to Chicago" award. In 1985, Jack Lang, then the French Minister of Culture, bestowed the Chevalier de L'ordre des Arts et des Lettres upon him during the Cannes Film Festival for his work in promoting fine arts.

In 1987, Kutza served on the Camera d'Or Jury at the Cannes Film Festival. In 1995, he was a member of the jury at the 45th Berlin International Film Festival. In 1996, the city of Chicago honorarily designated S. Michigan Ave from Van Buren to Congress as "Michael J. Kutza Way." In 2009, Kutza was honored by the Landmarks Preservation Council of Illinois as one of its "Legendary Landmarks", a title bestowed on "citizens who have made contributions to the civic and cultural life of Chicago and Illinois." In 2010, Kutza accepted the "Media Award" from the Niagara Foundation's Peace & Dialogue Awards. The same year, Chicago Magazine included Kutza on their list of "Top 40 Chicago Pioneers," alongside Oprah, Barack Obama, Studs Terkel, Roger Ebert, and Gene Siskel. In 2012, Kutza received the American Cinematheque's Sydney Pollack Award. Cinematheque chairman Rick Nicita described the award: “The Sydney Pollack Award honors someone who has been of critical importance and continuing influence in non-profit film exhibition, film preservation and/or independent film distribution - people whose work Sydney supported and found to be so valuable, who are not often recognized for their efforts. And there’s no one who better represents Sydney’s commitment to the art of film than Michael.” In June 2015, Michael Kutza was named a Knight of the Legion of Honour by the President of the French Republic for his achievements as "an internationally recognized graphic designer, filmmaker and the Founder of the Chicago International Film Festival." The Italian government awarded Kutza with the Order of Merit of the Italian Republic in 2017 for his contribution to Italian film.

== Personal life ==
Kutza continues to live in Chicago, where he works as a creative consultant. In 2022, Kutza published an autobiography, entitled Starstruck: How I Magically Transformed Chicago into Hollywood for More Than Fifty Years. Kutza is currently writing another book entitled The Crazies, about his personal friendships.

== Films ==
Kutza's 15-minute short documentary film Emanon won a Diplome d'Honneur at the 1962 Cannes Film Festival.
