= Moments (1979 film) =

1979 film

- Directed by: Michal Bat-Adam
- Written by: Michal Bat-Adam
- Produced by: Moshé Mizrahi
- Starring: Michal Bat-Adam
- Cinematography: Yves Lafaye
- Release date: 14 November 1979 (US)
- Running time: 96 minutes
- Countries: Israel; France
- Languages: Hebrew; French

Moments (French: Moments de la vie d'une femme, Hebrew: רגעים, translit. Rega'im) is a 1979 French-Israeli drama art film written, directed and starring Michal Bat-Adam. The film was selected as the Israeli entry for the Best Foreign Language Film at the 52nd Academy Awards, but was not accepted as a nominee. It also competed in the Un Certain Regard section at the 1979 Cannes Film Festival.

== Cast ==
- Michal Bat-Adam as Yola
- Dahn Ben Amotz as Architect
- Brigitte Catillon as Anne
- Assi Dayan as Avi
- Eliram Dekel as Roni
- Goldie Heller as Taxi Passenger
- Elisabeth Klein as American Tourist
- Yehoshua Luff as Hotel Waiter
- Rose Meshihi as Maid
- Tova Piron as Restaurant Server

== See also ==
- List of submissions to the 52nd Academy Awards for Best Foreign Language Film
- List of Israeli submissions for the Academy Award for Best Foreign Language Film
