= Miri Fabian =

Israeli actress

Miri Fabian (Hebrew: מירי פביאן; born 30 August 1943 in Nováky, Slovak Republic) is an Israeli actress. She may be best known for her role as Chaja Dresner in Steven Spielberg's Holocaust drama Schindler's List.

== Life ==
Miri Fabian was born 1943 during World War II in a camp for Slovak Jews in Nováky. Together with her mother and two siblings she barely escaped the last transport to the Auschwitz concentration camp. Her father, who fought in a partisan unit, was able to locate the family after the war had ended. The family first lived in the west Slovak town of Topoľčany. In 1949 they migrated to Israel, where they moved to Rosh Pinna in the early 1950s. Miri Fabian later got married and had two children. Her brother was killed in action in 1967 during the Six-Day War.

After her exams Fabian successfully completed acting training at Beit Zvi in Ramat Gan. She started her career in the theatre. Later she was also acting in various Israeli film and TV productions. In 1993 Fabian was cast for the role of Chaja Dresner in Steven Spielberg's film Schindler's List. She struggled to complete the distressing scene in which a number of Schindler Jews are forced into a room that appears to be a gas chamber. During production breaks she visited her birthplace Nováky and Topoľčany for the first time in 50 years.

== Selected filmography ==
- 1980: The Thin Line (על חבל דק)
- 1983: A Married Couple (זוג נשוי)
- 1984: Forced Testimony (עדות מאונס)
- 1990: Where Eagles Fly (דרך הנשר)
- 1993: Schindler's List
- 1993: Overdose מנת יתר
- 1996: The Italians Are Coming (האיטלקים באים)
- 1998: Gentila (ז'נטילה)
- 2007: Jellyfish (מדוזות)
- 2011: Policeman (השוטר)
