= The Lover (1986 film) =

1986 film directed by Michal Bat-Adam

The Lover המאהב
- Directed by: Michal Bat-Adam
- Screenplay by: Michal Bat-Adam; Tzvika Kertzner
- Based on: The Lover, novel by A. B. Yehoshua
- Produced by: Yoram Globus; Menahem Golan
- Starring: Michal Bat-Adam; Yehoram Gaon
- Edited by: Tova Ascher
- Production company: Golan-Globus Productions
- Release date: 1986 (Israel)
- Running time: 90 minutes
- Country: Israel
- Language: Hebrew

The Lover is a 1986 Israeli drama film, directed by Michal Bat-Adam. It is based on the 1977 novel of the same name by A. B. Yehoshua. Bat-Adam also starred in the film, alongside Yehoram Gaon, and wrote the screenplay in collaboration with Tzvika Kertzner.

== Background and production ==
When the novel The Lover (by A. B. Yehoshua) came out in 1977, it was an unprecedented bestseller, and the talk of social salons and the media alike. It powerfully described the loneliness of its characters, as well as all the forbidden relationships between them: Between a married woman and her lover, between the married father and his daughter's friend, and between a Jewish girl and her Arab love interest. When it was announced that the book would be developed into a film, all the major producers, actors, directors and screenwriters in Israel wanted to be involved.

However, production company owner Menahem Golan was busy setting up his new American production company, and the project kept running into problems and personnel changes. At the start, Golan approved his house-director, Boaz Davidson's request to direct, with the understanding that he would finish up his current obligations, then work on The Lover. But two years later, he was still delaying the project due to his workload. Golan set out to find a new director, and was faced with a difficult choice. Yehoshua wanted Oded Kotler to direct, but Kotler had never directed a feature before. Another potential director was Dan Wolman, who had experience with adaptations, and several other directors. But Golan also kept putting off the decision.

About 15 months before the film was eventually released, Golan saw the film "Atalia", starring Michal Bat-Adam, and knew he had found his Asia. Bat-Adam agreed to act in the film only if she could also direct it, and Golan agreed immediately. Within a few months the adapted screenplay was completed, and casting began. Bat-Adam wanted actor Yossi Pollack for the role of Adam, and his selection was even announced in the press, but Golan was adamant that Yehoram Gaon – better known as a singer – was the only possible choice. Golan, it seems, owed a debt of gratitude to Gaon, who had advised him to by the movie rights for The Lover. Golan did admire Gaon's acting, nevertheless, especially in his 1976 film "Kazablan". The widely admired acting teacher Fanny Lubitsch was cast as the "all-seeing" grandmother, and the rest of the cast joined soon thereafter. But personnel issues continued right up to the start of filming, when the cinematographer David Gurfinkel was brought in at the very last moment.

Bat-Adam insisted on rehearsals before the filming began, much like a theater production. The actors expressed surprise, but in the end were pleased with the process.

Filming took place mostly in Haifa, and also in Tel Aviv and Jerusalem. The filming took 8 weeks. The film was cut in two versions – one in Hebrew, and one in English.

== Plot summary ==
Adam (Yehoram Gaon) and Asia (Michal Bat-Adam) are a married couple, who no longer have sex. (The reason for this is not revealed in the film, though it is in the novel.) Asia, who is studying for her PhD, faces difficulty with some of the material, which is in Spanish. Adam, a car repair shop owner, asks a customer, Gavriel (Roberto Pollack) to be her translator in lieu of payment for fixing his car.

Gavriel is an Israeli who lives in Argentina, and is visiting in Israel to deal with his dying grandmother's estate. Not realizing how expensive the repairs would be to his grandmother's vintage car, he agrees. After a short time working with Asia, everyone, including Asia and Adam's daughter Daphna ("Dafi"), realize that the two have become lovers.

The year is 1973, and the Yom Kippur War breaks out. Adam pressures Gavriel to enlist, and he disappears, along with his iconic car. The war ends, prisoners are exchanged, and there is still no sign of Gavriel. Adam asks his young Arab worker, Naim, for help – and the two break into the grandmother's apartment, to try and find clues to Gavriel's whereabouts. They discover that the grandmother's health has improved.

The grandmother advises Adam to seek Gavriel at night, not in the day. He begins to work with Naim towing cars from accidents. Dafi joins them, gradually dropping out of school, and growing closer to Naim. Around this time, Dafi's schoolmate Tali sets her sights on Adam – she corners him, undresses in front of him, and in spite of his protestations, touches him. They end up having sex, which Adam then says was a mistake and a moment of weakness.

One night, Adam finds a piece of metal from the car Gavriel is driving at the site of a hit and run accident. The driver of the car that was hit says the other car had Haredim (ultra-orthodox Jews, recognizable by their anachronistic 17th-century black clothing) in it, and sped off towards Jerusalem. Adam goes to a Haredi neighborhood in Jerusalem, Mea Shearim, and finds Gavriel.

Gavriel tells him that he was drafted to fight at the front in the war, and escaped with the help of a Haredi group who came to cheer up the troops. At this same time, Gavriel's grandmother passes away, and Asia tells him he should leave and never come back. When the three of them return to the family home, they find Dafi and Naim after getting dressed, after having sex. Adam drives Naim back to his village and fires him. But before leaving, hands him a package filled with money, so that he can go back to school. Naim refuses to take it. He returns home, and Asia tells him about her separation from Gavriel.

== Cast ==
- Asia – Michal Bat-Adam
- Adam – Yehoram Gaon
- Gavriel – Roberto Pollack
- Gavriel's grandmother – Fanny Lubitsch
- Daphna (Dafi) – Avigail Ariely
- Naim – Awas Khatib
- Tali – Noa Aizik

== Reception ==
The film created a media scandal in Israel when it was released, due to the perception that it presents marital infidelity as a positive thing. Bat-Adam described this as "a lynching", which pushed her to the brink of giving up filmmaking. However, the film was a theatrical success, and 23 films later, Bat-Adam is known as "the queen of Israeli cinema".

In her review in Haaretz, Rachel Gordin wrote that "the film manages to touch on very real points of the viewers' emotions" thanks to the character of Naim as portrayed by Awas Khatib, but that "it otherwise never really extends beyond the realm of melodrama." Irit Shamgar, in Ha'ir, celebrated the fact that The Lover "beat the censorship" and was approved for screening, while her colleague Danny Wurt said in his review that the portrayal of the main characters left him unimpressed, though he found the secondary characters of Naim and the grandmother to be more alive and humorous. Yedioth reviewer Nachman Einberger panned the film, claiming it had "not one moment of grace", while A. B. Yehoshua, the author of the novel the film is based upon, expressed his satisfaction with the translation of his work to film. Yael Israel, reviewer for "Al Hamishmar", gave the film a positive review, calling it "an easy-to-digest and realistic adaptation".
