= Boy Meets Girl (1982 film) =

- Theatrical poster
- Directed by: Michal Bat-Adam
- Screenplay by: Michal Bat-Adam
- Produced by: Avi Kleinberger; Gideon Amir
- Starring: Gabi Eldor; Ilan Dar; Shai Golan
- Cinematography: Nurith Aviv
- Edited by: Hagit Hanin; Lena Kadish
- Music by: Nurit Hirsch
- Release date: July 1982
- Running time: 85 minutes
- Country: Israel
- Language: Hebrew

Boy Meets Girl (Hebrew: בן לוקח בת Ben Loke'ah Bat) is a 1982 Israeli drama directed by Michal Bat-Adam. It was filmed on location at Kibbutz Ma'ayan Tzvi.

The film is named after a dance game of the same name. The film explores the conflicts between the contrasting cultures of that time in Israeli society, where kibbutzim still held a key canonical role. It examines the relationship between the urban outsider and the kibbutz native, highlighting the differences and tensions between them.

The plot is a semi-autobiographical account of Bat-Adam’s own upbringing at a kibbutz boarding school. Her 1994 film, Aya: Imagined Autobiography (Hebrew: איה), revisits the character of Aya, who is now a married woman haunted by her past.

== Plot ==
Aya (Einat Helfman) is a shy 10-year-old girl who has grown up in Tel Aviv. When her parents, who are both doctors, travel to Thailand as part of their work, Aya is placed in a boarding school on a kibbutz. As an outsider, she has difficulty adjusting to the insularity and unfamiliar values and practices of kibbutz society. She struggles to cope with the challenges of living with dozens of her peers in a communal children's dormitory where there is no separation according to gender.

== Cast ==
- Einat Helfman as Aya
- Gabi Eldor as Ina
- Ilan Dar as Aya's father
- Shai Golan as Zvika
- Gill Dontchevzky as Neni
- Ayala Fiszel as Hanna's Mother
- Erella Ashkenazi as Teacher
- Andrea Sade as English Teacher
- Dina Limon as Teacher
- Assaf Zur as Giora
- Osnat Farago as Hanna
- Eyal Fox as Dodo
- Boaz Rekiewicz as Roni
- Amalya Dayan as Amalya
