= Aya: Imagined Autobiography =

- Theatrical release poster
- איה: אוטוביוגרפיה דמיונית
- Directed by: Michal Bat-Adam
- Written by: Michal Bat-Adam
- Produced by: Marek Rozenbaum
- Starring: Michal Bat-Adam; Michal Zoharetz; Shira Lew-Munk; Liat Goren; Gedalia Besser; Levana Finkelstein; Alexander Peleg; Keren Tenenbaum; Zahi Har-Nevo; Menashe Noy; Davida Karol; Elvira Kohnof; Avi Kleinberger; Uri Gottlieb; Tzak Berkman; Assi Hanegbi; Nurit Shtark; Adam Blich; Shmuel Shaked; Yossi Ashdot; Pnina Tolshinski; Shelly Varod
- Cinematography: Yoav Kosh
- Edited by: Boaz Leon
- Music by: Amos Hadani
- Production companies: Transfax Film Productions; Israel Film Fund; Mimar Film Production; G. G. Studios
- Distributed by: National Center for Jewish Film
- Release date: 1994 (Israel)
- Running time: 87 Minutes
- Country: Israel
- Language: Hebrew
- Budget: $ 650,000

Aya: Imagined Autobiography (Hebrew: איה: אוטוביוגרפיה דמיונית, tr. Aya: Autobiographia Dimionit) is a 1994 Israeli independent underground dramatic art film directed by Michal Bat-Adam. The titular character is the same one from the director's earlier film Boy Meets Girl, now haunted by her past.

== Synopsis ==
Aya (Michal Bat-Adam, played by Michal Zoharetz as a teenager, by Shira Lew-Munk as a child, and, inside the fictional film, by Keren Tenenbaum), a thirtysomething film director, married and mother of one, is shooting a film about her life. The film presents the story of the filming of this fictional film while intersecting within it her dreams and delusions from her life and relations with her father Gedalia Besser, played inside the fictional film by Alexander Peleg) and her mentally ill mother (Liat Goren, played inside the fictional film by Levana Finkelstein). Aya sees her life as a striving to exist, namely, to do something important in life, both in her eyes and in her father's. However, while making this film, Aya understands that all of this striving for something large is pointless, and, that what really matters is the ability to experience every moment of life, finding meaning therein.

== Reception ==
Writing in Haaretz, critic Uri Klein opined that the film is director Michal Bat-Adam's best one so far, while Ha'ir critic Dr. Shmuel Duvdevani wrote that it was her most personal as well as her most interesting one to date. Time Out Tel Aviv critic Yair Raveh noted that watching this film "is like meeting for the first time someone who insists on telling you about a very intimate dream he had had, while exposing you to his unedited and private world of fantasies and associations." Abroad, Variety stated that, in this film, the "clash between film and reality is really the core of the movie, with scenes from the autobiographical film clashing with scenes from Aya’s memory. Sometimes the memory is harsher and sometimes the film is, as if Bat-Adam doesn’t trust either as a source of truth."
