= I Love You Rosa =

- Directed by: Moshé Mizrahi
- Written by: Moshé Mizrahi
- Produced by: Yoram Globus; Menahem Golan; Itzik Kol
- Starring: Zivi Avramson
- Cinematography: Adam Greenberg
- Edited by: Dov Hoenig
- Music by: Dov Seltzer
- Release date: 1972
- Running time: 92 minutes
- Country: Israel
- Language: Hebrew

I Love You Rosa (Hebrew: אני אוהב אותך רוזה, romanized: Ani Ohev Otach Roza) is a 1972 Israeli New Sensibility film written and directed by Moshé Mizrahi. The film's plot takes place in the Jewish Quarter of Jerusalem at the beginning of the 20th century. Mizrahi claimed that he wrote the script based on a true event that happened in his family and was passed down through stories over the years.

The film was nominated for the Academy Award for Best Foreign Language Film. It was also entered into the 1972 Cannes Film Festival.

== Plot ==
Present Day: Eleven-year-old Nessim accompanies his grandmother Rosa to visit the grave of her husband, who died forty years ago. Rosa promises to join him at the grave soon. Shortly after, she falls seriously ill. She believes that her grandson strongly resembles her late husband, after whom he was named.

Year 1887: Rosa, aged only twenty, becomes a widow when her husband Rafael dies without leaving an heir. According to the law, Rafael's brother must marry her to continue the family name. However, Rafael's brother David is already married with four children. Rafael's younger brother Nessim, being only eleven, cannot marry her. Despite this, Nessim expresses his desire to marry Rosa, claiming his love for her. For this, he receives a slap from his mother.

Rosa earns her living unusually for her time, working in the baths during the day and as a seamstress at night. Her friend Jamila tries to set her up with a tradesman named Eli, but Rosa refuses, knowing she is promised to Nessim by law as long as he is willing to marry her. One night, Nessim seeks refuge with her, despising his own mother. When Nessim's mother comes to take him home with great commotion the next day, the rabbi intervenes. Since Nessim wants to live with Rosa and she agrees to raise him, and David is relieved to have one less child in the house, Nessim is allowed to stay with Rosa.

Rosa encourages him to study and rejects his declarations of love, reminding him that he is still a child. At the same time, she does not yield to Eli's advances but convinces him to take Nessim on as an apprentice at the age of thirteen. Nessim studies diligently, knowing that this is the only way he can earn money and eventually marry Rosa. However, his coming of age proves to be difficult over the months. He starts to rebel and come home late from playing. When Rosa reproaches him, he retorts that she is not his mother. Rosa pretends to throw him out of the house, and he collapses. Later, when he does household chores, he is mocked by the women of the street as a "girl." At the same time, he is deeply horrified when a friend takes him to a brothel, where a woman offers herself to him. Shortly after, when Nessim receives his first job and gets paid, he becomes arrogant, throwing the money at Rosa, claiming to be an adult, and ordering her to bring him food. She responds coolly, stating that he has changed to the extent that she no longer wants him by her side. Nessim leaves her house bewildered.

Five years later, Nessim is of legal age and has a girlfriend. A woman reads his future in a cup and explains that although he has a woman by his side, his heart belongs to another. Nessim returns to Rosa, pretending to visit her on behalf of a friend. However, she recognizes him and embraces him, having never forgotten him. The next morning, she explains to him that she still cannot marry him. He is the man prescribed to her by law. However, she wants to decide for herself. He reluctantly agrees to renounce his right to marry her. However, Rosa does not complete the formal ceremony of renunciation, "Chalitza," in front of the rabbi; instead, she leaves the room prematurely. She withdraws, and Nessim collapses lovesick. Many months later, emaciated with pain, he seeks her out. Now she tells him about a young woman who became a widow. She recounts their story together, which ends with this woman asking him to be her husband. Both fall into each other's arms happily.

In the present, Rosa senses her end approaching. One last time, she sits up in her bed and calls Nessim's name before she dies.

== Cast ==
In alphabetical order

- Zivi Avramson - Esther
- Naomi Bachar - Luna
- Michal Bat-Adam - Rosa
- Yehuda Efroni - Don Yitzhak
- Levana Finkelstein - Jamila
- Esther Grotes - Alegra
- Gunther Hirschberg - narrator
- Avner Hizkiyahu - Rabbi
- Elisheva Michaeli - Regina
- Gabi Otterman - young Nissim
- Aliza Rosen - Rabbi's wife
- Yosef Shiloach - Eli
- Moshe Tal - adult Nissim
- Sharit Yishai - Fortuna

== Production ==
The film is inspired by the life of Moshé Mizrahi's mother. It marked the final collaboration of filmmakers Menachem Golan and Yoram Globus in Israel before they relocated to Hollywood, where they acquired Cannon Films. The film features Gabi Otterman in his only cinematic role, portraying young Nessim in both past and present. Rabbi Gunter Hirschberg serves as the film's narrator.

During the shoot in Jerusalem, there was a brief but intense snowfall. Instead of avoiding it, the filmmakers skillfully integrated it into the script.

The film premiered on 10 May 1972, at the Cannes Film Festival.

== Religious background ==
The central conflict in the film revolves around the Levirate, a law outlined in Deuteronomy 25:5–10 (Luther Bible). It states, among other provisions:

"When brothers reside together and one of them dies without leaving a son, the wife of the deceased must not marry outside the family to a stranger. Instead, her brother-in-law shall take her as his wife and fulfill the duty of a brother-in-law to her. [...] But if the man refuses to marry his sister-in-law and she goes to the elders at the gate and says, 'My brother-in-law refuses to perpetuate his brother's name in Israel; he will not fulfill the duty of a brother-in-law to me,' then the elders of his town shall summon him and talk to him. If he persists in saying, 'I do not want to marry her,' his sister-in-law shall go up to him in the presence of the elders, remove his sandal from his foot, spit in his face, and say, 'This is what is done to the man who will not build up his brother's family.'"

— – Deuteronomy 25:5–10

This quote opens the film. Rosa interrupts the "Chalitza" ceremony, where she is supposed to symbolically remove Nessim's Chalitza shoe before the elders, and leaves.

== Recognition ==
At the 1972 Cannes Film Festival, the film competed for the Palme d'Or. I Love You Rosa received a nomination for the Academy Award for Best Foreign Language Film in 1973.

== See also ==
- List of submissions to the 45th Academy Awards for Best Foreign Language Film
- List of Israeli submissions for the Academy Award for Best Foreign Language Film
