= Ronny Douek =

Israeli businessman, social entrepreneur and philanthropist

- רוני דואק
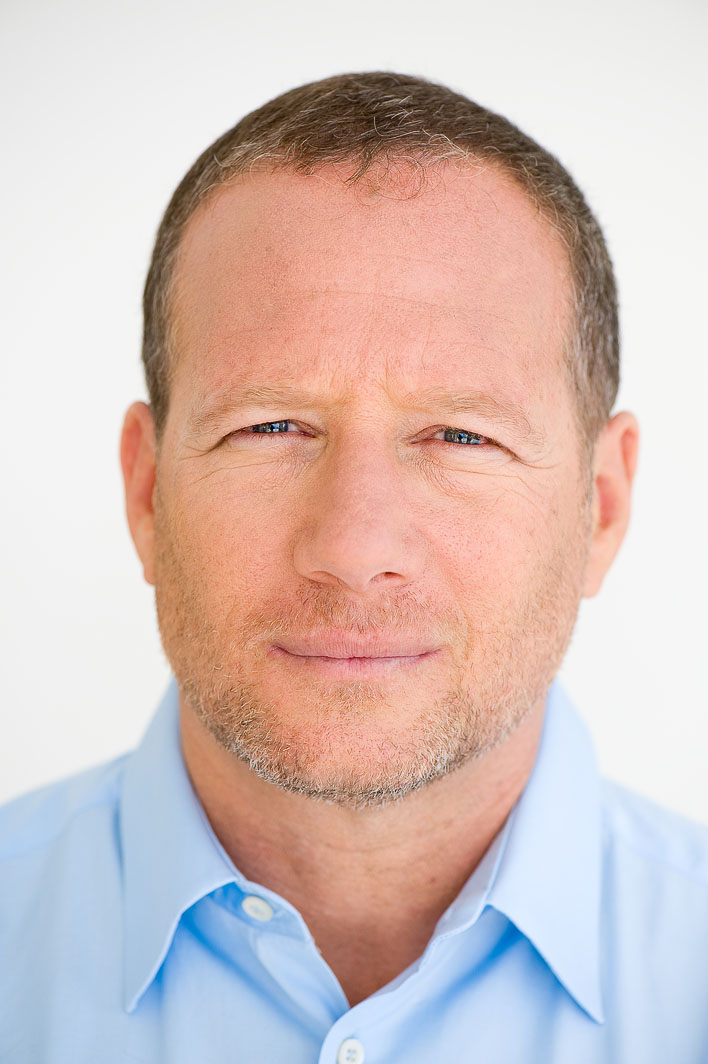
- Born: 1958 (age 67–68); Haifa, Israel
- Occupations: Businessman, investor, and philanthropost
- Known for: Founding Zionism 2000 and Sheatufim
- Spouse: Evelyn (?–2003)
- Children: 5
- Awards: Israel Prize (2025)

Ronny Douek (Hebrew: רוני דואק; born 1958 in Haifa) is an Israeli businessman, investor, and philanthropist. He has founded multiple social entrepreneurial and non-profit ventures, including Zionism 2000, Sheatufim and Uru, and has served as chairman of the Israel Anti-Drug Authority. In 2025 he received the Israel Prize for lifetime achievement.

== Social activism ==
In 1990, Douek founded Ach-Shav, an association which worked with new immigrants from the former Soviet Union and Ethiopia. Ach-Shav established community centers at the caravan sites that provided provisional housing for the new immigrants. In 1994, he founded "Alter-Nativ", a national initiative for fighting substance abuse, which was later adopted by the Israel Anti-Drug Authority and became its flagship program for prevention of substance abuse by youth. By 2004, over 300 thousand teenagers participated in Alter-Nativ workshops in hundreds of schools and other educational settings across Israel.

In 1995, Douek and a group of friends founded Zionism 2000, which develops social betterment projects. In 1998, it established ALEH, Hebrew acronym for "Business for the Community", which helps business entities become engaged with the community in a professional manner.

In 2008 Douek was one of torch-lighters at the torch-lighting ceremony on Mount Herzl in Jerusalem to open the Israel's 60th Independence Day anniversary celebrations.

During the COVID-19 pandemic he started an initiative to protect elderly people. After the October 7 attacks in 2023 he launched Our Children's Resilience, which supports children in communities near the Gaza and Lebanon borders. The project later opened an educational centre at Kibbutz Gvulot.

Douek co-chaired the General Assembly of the Jewish Federations of North America in 2001 and 2013.<ref>{{cite web|title=General Assembly Leadership|url=http://www.jewishfederations.org/page.aspx?id=24598
