= A Married Couple (1983 film) =

1983 film

- Film poster
- Directed by: Yitzhak Yeshurun
- Starring: Yaron London
- Edited by: Tova Asher
- Release date: 1983
- Running time: 90 minutes
- Country: Israel
- Language: Hebrew

A Married Couple (Hebrew: זוג נשוי) is a 1983 Israeli drama film directed by Yitzhak Yeshurun. The film was selected as the Israeli entry for the Best Foreign Language Film at the 56th Academy Awards, but was not accepted as a nominee.

== Cast ==
- Zivit Abramson
- Amnon Dankner
- Miri Fabian
- Ruth Harlap
- Avi Kleinberger
- Yaron London

== See also ==
- List of submissions to the 56th Academy Awards for Best Foreign Language Film
- List of Israeli submissions for the Academy Award for Best Foreign Language Film
