= Life Is Life (film) =

2003 Israeli film

- Theatrical release poster
- חיים זה חיים
- Directed by: Michal Bat-Adam
- Written by: Michal Bat-Adam
- Produced by: Moshé Mizrahi; Michal Bat-Adam
- Starring: Moshe Ivgy; Yael Abecassis; Hanny Nahmias; Yigal Sade; Rivka Michaeli; Rivka Gur; Rita Shukrun; Adi Gilat; Michal Levi; Chana Pete; Noa Port; Moshé Mizrahi
- Cinematography: Yoav Kosh
- Edited by: Sharon Guetta
- Music by: Daniel Mizrahi
- Production companies: Israel Film Fund; Tel Aviv Foundation; The Yehoshua Rabinovich Tel Aviv Foundation for the Arts
- Distributed by: Eden Cinema
- Release dates: 30 August 2003 (Montreal World Film Festival); 10 October 2003 (Israel)
- Running time: 90 Minutes
- Country: Israel
- Language: Hebrew
- Budget: ₪ 1,570,800

Life Is Life (Hebrew: חיים זה חיים, tr. Haïm Ze Haïm) is a 2003 Israeli independent underground dramatic art film directed by Michal Bat-Adam.

== Synopsis ==
Macky (Moshe Ivgy), a 50-year-old novelist and university lecturer, is having an affair with Ayala (Yael Abecassis), his 32-year-old former student who is currently a literature teacher. Ayala's husband leaves home and she, offended, collapses. Despite her love for Macky, she refuses to meet him. Macky, heartbroken due to Ayala's lack of presence in his life, feels as if his ability to write has disappeared because of this fact. Surprisingly, he finds his way back to his own wife, Miriam (Hanny Nahmias), despite the fact that he has long ago ceased to be interested in her.

== Reception ==
Abroad, Variety critic Joe Leydon called the film a "melancholy dramedy about missed connections and libidinal vicissitudes" that "likely will satisfy discerning auds during its global fest tour."
