= Brigitte Catillon =

French actress and screenwriter

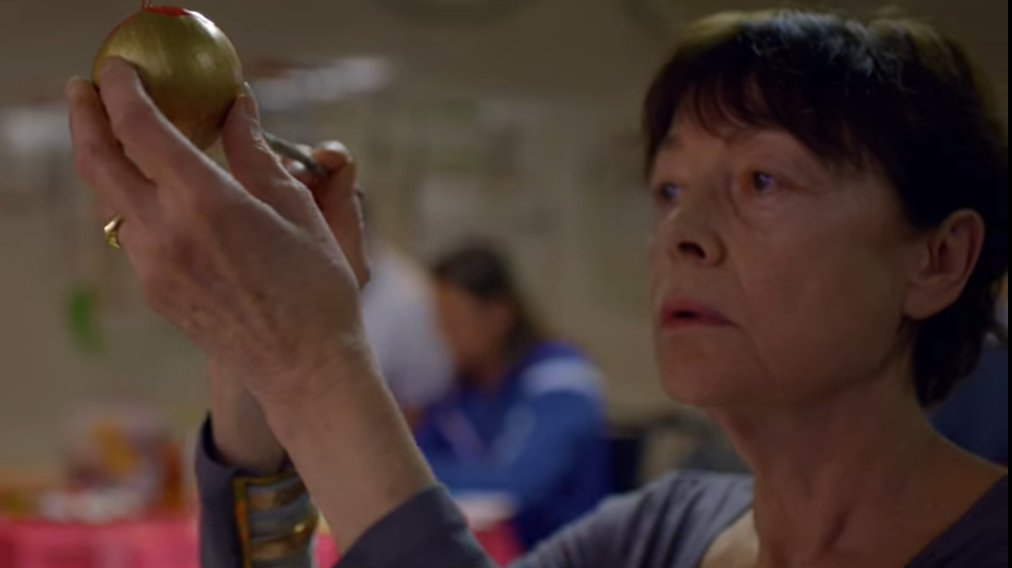
- Born: 20 July 1951 (age 74)
- Occupations: Actress; Screenwriter
- Years active: 1977–present

Brigitte Catillon (born 20 July 1951) is a French actress and screenwriter. She was nominated for the César Award for Best Supporting Actress in 1993 for A Heart in Winter directed by Claude Sautet. She was also nominated for the Molière Award for actress in a supporting role in 2007 for the play EVA of Nicolas Bedos, and in 2011 for the play Nono of Sacha Guitry, directed by Michel Fau.

== Selected filmography ==
Year	Title	Role	Notes
2017	Endangered Species	Nicole Gardet	
2014	Marie's Story	Mother Superior	
2009	Don't Look Back		
2006	Tell No One		
2004	Les Sœurs fâchées		
2000	Merci pour le chocolat		
2000	Le goût des autres		
1996	The Proprietor		
1993	Louis, the Child King		
1991	Dingo		
1988	The Reader		
1986	La dernière image		
1984	The Judge		
1979	Moments		
1978	Molière	Armande Béjart	
1977	Spoiled Children		
1977	Monsieur Papa	Martine	
