= List of Israeli submissions for the Academy Award for Best International Feature Film =

Best International Feature Film submissions from Israel

Highlights
- Debut: 1964
- Submissions: 59
- Nominations: 10
- Oscar winners: none

Israel has submitted films for the Academy Award for Best International Feature Film (Note: The category was previously named the Academy Award for Best Foreign Language Film, but this was changed to the Academy Award for Best International Feature Film in April 2019, after the Academy deemed the word "Foreign" to be outdated.) since 1964. The Academy of Motion Picture Arts and Sciences has invited the film industries of various countries to submit their best film for the Academy Award for Best International Feature Film since 1956. An AMPAS' committee oversees the process and reviews all the submitted films. Following this, they vote via secret ballot to determine the five nominees for the award. Since 1991, the submission is decided based on the winner of the Ophir Award for Best Film, organized by the Israeli Academy of Film and Television.

As of 2026, Israel has been nominated ten times. Its most recent nominated film was Footnote (2011).

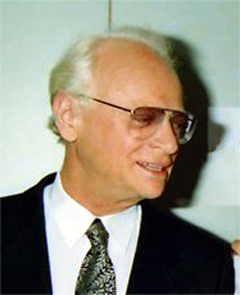
Ephraim Kishon directed Sallah (1964), Israel's first film nominated for the award.

== Submissions ==
Despite its relatively small film-making industry, Israeli is one of the most nominated countries in the category.

In 2007, Aviva My Love and Sweet Mud tied for the Ophir Award for Best Film, necessitating a second round of voting which resulted in the submission of Sweet Mud. In 2008 The Band's Visit won the Ophir Award for Best Film but was disqualified by AMPAS for containing too much English dialogue. The runner-up Beaufort was submitted in its place, resulting in Israel's first Oscar nomination in 23 years.

The most successful Israeli filmmaker is this category is Moshé Mizrahi, who received two nominations representing Israel, and whose 1977 film Madame Rosa won representing France. Ephraim Kishon represented Israel twice, and was nominated both times. Joseph Cedar and Savi Gavison have represented Israel three times each, and Cedar was nominated twice.

In most of the Israeli submissions, the majority of the dialogue was in Hebrew. Films which notably used another language as a primary spoken language are The Glass Cage and Moments (French), Late Marriage (Georgian) and Ajami (the local dialect of Arabic). Many others, including Yana's Friends and Saint Clara, feature a heavy dose of Russian.

Below is a list of the films that have been submitted by Israel for review by AMPAS, along with the year of the submission and the respective Academy Award ceremony.

Year (Ceremony)	Film title used in nomination	Original title	Director	Result
1964 (37th)	Sallah	סאלח שבתי	Ephraim Kishon	Nominated
1965 (38th)	The Glass Cage	כלוב הזכוכית	Philippe Arthuys and Jean-Louis Levi-Alvarès	Not nominated
1966 (39th)	The Flying Matchmaker	שני קוני למל	Israel Becker	Not nominated
1968 (41st)	Every Bastard a King	כל ממזר מלך	Uri Zohar	Not nominated
1969 (42nd)	Siege	מצור	Gilberto Tofano	Not nominated
1971 (44th)	The Policeman	השוטר אזולאי	Ephraim Kishon	Nominated
1972 (45th)	I Love You Rosa	אני אוהב אותך רוזה	Moshé Mizrahi	Nominated
1973 (46th)	The House on Chelouche Street	הבית ברחוב שלוש	Moshé Mizrahi	Nominated
1975 (48th)	My Michael	מיכאל שלי	Dan Wolman	Not nominated
1977 (50th)	Operation Thunderbolt	מבצע יונתן	Menahem Golan	Nominated
1978 (51st)	Lemon Popsicle	אסקימו לימון	Boaz Davidson	Not nominated
1979 (52nd)	Moments	רגעים	Michal Bat-Adam	Not nominated
1980 (53rd)	The Thin Line	על חבל דק	Michal Bat-Adam	Not nominated
1981 (54th)	A Thousand Little Kisses	אלף נשיקות קטנות	Mira Recanati	Not nominated
1982 (55th)	Hamsin	חמסין	Daniel Wachsmann	Not nominated
1983 (56th)	A Married Couple	זוג נשוי	Yitzhak Yeshurun	Not nominated
1984 (57th)	Beyond the Walls	מאחורי הסורגים	Uri Barbash	Nominated
1985 (58th)	When Night Falls	עד סוף הלילה	Eitan Green	Not nominated
1986 (59th)	Avanti Popolo	אוונטי פופולו	Rafi Bukai	Not nominated
1987 (60th)	I Don't Give a Damn	לא שם זין	Shmuel Imberman	Not nominated
1988 (61st)	The Summer of Aviya	הקיץ של אביה	Eli Cohen	Not nominated
1989 (62nd)	One of Us	אחד משלנו	Uri Barbash	Not nominated
1990 (63rd)	The Lookout	שורו	Savi Gabizon	Not nominated
1991 (64th)	Beyond the Sea	מעבר לים	Jacob Goldwasser	Not nominated
1992 (65th)	Life According to Agfa	החיים על פי אגפא	Assi Dayan	Not nominated
1993 (66th)	Revenge of Itzik Finkelstein	נקמתו של איציק פינקלשטיין	Enrique Rottenberg	Not nominated
1994 (67th)	Sh'Chur	שחור	Shmuel Hasfari	Not nominated
1995 (68th)	Lovesick on Nana Street	חולה אהבה בשיכון גימל)	Savi Gabizon	Not nominated
1996 (69th)	Saint Clara	קלרה הקדושה	Ari Folman and Ori Sivan	Not nominated
1997 (70th)	Pick a Card	עפולה אקספרס	Julie Shles	Not nominated
1998 (71st)	Circus Palestine	קרקס פלשתינה	Eyal Halfon	Not nominated
1999 (72nd)	Yana's Friends	החברים של יאנה	Arik Kaplun	Not nominated
2000 (73rd)	Time of Favor	ההסדר	Joseph Cedar	Not nominated
2001 (74th)	Late Marriage	חתונה מאוחרת	Dover Kosahvili	Not nominated
2002 (75th)	Broken Wings	כנפיים שבורות	Nir Bergman	Not nominated
2003 (76th)	Nina's Tragedies	האסונות של נינה	Savi Gabizon	Not nominated
2004 (77th)	Campfire	מדורת השבט	Joseph Cedar	Not nominated
2005 (78th)	What a Wonderful Place	איזה מקום נפלא	Eyal Halfon	Not nominated
2006 (79th)	Sweet Mud	אדמה משוגעת	Dror Shaul	Not nominated
2007 (80th)	Beaufort	בופור	Joseph Cedar	Nominated
2008 (81st)	Waltz with Bashir	ואלס עם באשיר	Ari Folman	Nominated
2009 (82nd)	Ajami	عجمي / עג'מי	Scandar Copti and Yaron Shani	Nominated
2010 (83rd)	The Human Resources Manager	שליחותו של הממונה על משאבי אנוש	Eran Riklis	Not nominated
2011 (84th)	Footnote	הערת שוליים	Joseph Cedar	Nominated
2012 (85th)	Fill the Void	למלא את החלל	Rama Burshtein	Not nominated
2013 (86th)	Bethlehem	בית לחם	Yuval Adler	Not nominated
2014 (87th)	Gett: The Trial of Viviane Amsalem	גט – המשפט של ויויאן אמסלם	Ronit Elkabetz, Shlomi Elkabetz	Not nominated
2015 (88th)	Baba Joon	באבא ג'ון	Yuval Delshad	Not nominated
2016 (89th)	Sand Storm	סופת חול	Elite Zexer	Not nominated
2017 (90th)	Foxtrot	פוֹקְסטְרוֹט	Samuel Maoz	Made shortlist
2018 (91st)	The Cakemaker	האופה מברלין	Ofir Raul Grazier	Not nominated
2019 (92nd)	Incitement	ימים נוראים	Yaron Zilberman	Not nominated
2020 (93rd)	Asia	אסיה	Ruthy Pribar	Not nominated
2021 (94th)	Let It Be Morning	ויהי בוקר	Eran Kolirin	Not nominated
2022 (95th)	Cinema Sabaya	סינמה סבאיא	Orit Fouks Rotem	Not nominated
2023 (96th)	Seven Blessings	שבע ברכות	Ayelet Menahemi	Not nominated
2024 (97th)	Come Closer	קרוב אלי	Tom Nesher	Not nominated
2025 (98th)	The Sea	הים	Shai Carmeli-Pollak	Not nominated
2026 (99th)	Tell Me Everything	עצמאות	Moshe Rosenthal	Pending

== See also ==
- List of Academy Award winners and nominees for Best International Feature Film
- Cinema of Israel
- List of Palestinian submissions for the Academy Award for Best International Feature Film
