= Sh'Chur =

- Promotional poster
- Directed by: Shmuel Hasfari
- Written by: Hanna Azoulay-Hasfari
- Produced by: Yoram Kislev
- Starring: Gila Almagor; Ronit Elkabetz
- Cinematography: David Gurfinkel
- Edited by: Zion Avrahamian
- Music by: Ori Vidislavski
- Production companies: Mecklberg Media Group; Movies Entertainment
- Release date: 1994
- Running time: 100 minutes
- Country: Israel
- Language: Hebrew

Sh'Chur (Hebrew: שחור) is a 1994 Israeli drama film starring Gila Almagor, Ronit Elkabetz and Hanna Azoulay-Hasfari. It was written by Azoulay-Hasfari and directed by her partner Shmuel Hasfari. Sh'Chur received critical acclaim and was the 1994 official Israeli submission for the Academy Award for Best Foreign Language Film. It was also awarded the Ophir Award for best film by the Israeli Film and Television Academy. The film garnered various discussions in the Israeli press over its representation of the Moroccan community in Israel.

== Plot ==
Cheli, a successful Israeli television personality, receives news that her father has died and she must immediately return to her childhood home for the funeral. She prepares for the journey and brings her young daughter Ruth, who is autistic. Along the way, Cheli is forced to pick up her older sister Pnina from the institution where she has resided since young adulthood. As the three women make their way back to the development town of Cheli’s youth, she is overcome with memories of her 1970s childhood.

At 13, Cheli, then Rachel, was an ambitious young girl chafing at the role assigned to her in her Moroccan immigrant family. The family is dysfunctional and each sibling experiences trouble living up to its expectations. Her mother and older sister Pnina, who is both developmentally disabled and an extremely potent medium, attempt to remedy these problems with sh’chur (traditional magic rituals). Rachel’s brother, Avram, is put on leave from his kibbutz, which threatened to send him to a psychologist for peeing the bed nightly. When her older brother Shlomo spots sister Zohara cavorting with a boyfriend, the family comes to the decision that it is time for her to be married. She is forced to marry her uncle Moshe, who is 20 years her senior. Zohara is distraught, leading her to attempt suicide by drinking kerosine, but she is caught and saved by the family. Meanwhile, Shlomo is pressured by Dede, the brother of his sweetheart Denise, to marry her. Shlomo refuses. Pnina is raped by Dede in revenge and eventually becomes pregnant, while Rachel has a fight with her father and is brutally beaten. A sh’chur ritual performed by their mother causes Pnina to miscarry.

The family assembles for Zohara and Moshe’s wedding. During the party, Pnina becomes upset and a freak storm appears, driving everyone else indoors. Rachel follows Pnina into the storm and berates her, telling her she wishes Pnina would get hit by a car and die. Pnina then flees into heavy traffic, where she causes a crash and is subsequently institutionalized. The rest of the siblings disperse to their original locations, and Rachel is sent off to boarding school. Upon arrival at the boarding school, Rachel abandons her previous identity altogether, introducing herself as “Cheli, from somewhere in Israel”.

In the present, after her father’s funeral, Cheli is seen wearing Pnina’s childhood amulet and telepathically communicating with her daughter Ruth. Pnina remains outside of the institution and lives with their mother, while Cheli has accepted the role of sh’chur in her life and forged a strong bond with her daughter for the first time.

== Themes ==
=== Mizrahi Representation ===
Sh’Chur was considered groundbreaking in its representation of Mizrahi Jews in Israel at the time of its release. Hanna Azoulay-Hasfari claims that the film is based closely on her own family and other members of the neighborhood she grew up in. She based the character Cheli on herself. Sh’Chur is also the first Israeli narrative film with a majority Moroccan Jewish cast and crew. The film was both praised and criticized in Israeli academic circles for subverting the traditional media portrayal of the warm, close-knit Mizrahi family, which was popularized by the Bourekas genre. Scriptwriter Azoulay-Hasfari states “After I finished school, I saw those Boureka [sic] films later and I didn’t see myself—or the group I came from—represented properly in them.” Sh’Chur was also accused of reinforcing stereotypes about Middle Eastern and North African Jews such as laziness, misogyny, and rigidity. Azoulay-Hasfari herself states she did not intend to represent Moroccan Jewish culture as a whole, but rather her own experiences. She hoped that her film would bring empathy and understanding: “With this film, I was trying to change the way we see those primitive acts or primitive behavior or ceremonies. I don’t know how to describe it, but it’s not superstition — it’s a culture.” Regardless of intention, most critics perceived this film as a negative critique of Moroccan Jewish culture.

=== Magic and Mysticism ===
Sh’chur, variously translated as black magic, white magic, and practical magic, is an Arabic term for traditional Moroccan mysticism. Unlike forms of Jewish mysticism such as Kabbalah, which is considered admirable in specific circumstances, sh’chur is often viewed as vulgar and primitive in Israeli society. While Azulay-Hasfari did original research in the creation of this film and claims that the practices portrayed are “mostly real”, scholars of sh’chur and Moroccan Jewish culture state that it is mostly poetic license and combines true sh’chur with generic practices such as demonology and the evil eye.

=== Disability ===
Disability is a frequently repeated motif in this film and is widely interpreted as a metaphor. In the context of the film, it is interpreted as malignant spirits entering the body which can be driven away (or invited) using sh’chur. Mental impairment correlates directly with magical power: the most impaired characters, Pnina and Ruth, display the strongest aptitude for sh’chur. It has been suggested that the various ailments of Rachel’s family, including blindness, mental illness, autism, and bedwetting, symbolically represent primitivism. These have also been interpreted as the stunting effect of tradition retained beyond its use. The autistic nature of Rachel’s daughter Ruth has been suggested to represent the uncertain future of the rootless 3rd generation of immigrants. Disability has also been suggested to represent the symbolic lack of power of the Mizrahi people in Israel, who have been derogatorily referred to as “a people without a future”.

== Critical reception ==
Sh’Chur received a mixed, but predominantly positive, reception both domestically and internationally. The dramatic shots, minimalistic aesthetics, and dreamlike lighting drew widespread acclaim. The film was praised as “groundbreaking” in its portrayal of Sephardic immigrants. Dov Halfon of Ha’aretz wrote “Sh’chur has broken one of the central tenets of traditional Sephardic thought: Always blame the Ashkenazis.” The film was a subject of extensive debate among Israeli academics for its perceived negative portrayal of Mizrahi Jewish community. Some critics complain that Sh’Chur portrays Mizrahim as responsible for their own marginalization and, as a result, in need of saving by the Ashkenazi dominant society. This film was widely interpreted as a narrative of escape from the restraints of backward tradition. Critic Amnon Lord states “The message is educational: help yourself. You can. Even against all odds.” However, Azoulay-Hasfari rejects these interpretations, retorting that Cheli’s story is not one of success: “[Cheli] is actually pathetic; she is pitiable in her spiritual and cultural impoverishment, much more than her primitive family is.” Although very successful in film and academic circles, Sh’Chur ultimately failed to achieve mainstream popularity among ordinary Israeli citizens. As a result, it had a limited impact on popular culture.

== Cast ==
- Hanna Azoulay-Hasfari as Rachel (nicknamed “Cheli”), a young Israeli television personality who lives estranged from her rural Moroccan immigrant family with her daughter Ruth.
- Orly Ben-Garti as Young Rachel.
- Eti Adar as Ruth, Cheli’s autistic daughter.
- Ronit Elkabetz as Pnina, Rachel’s troubled older sister. A dedicated practitioner of sh’chur who is institutionalized in young adulthood.
- Gila Almagor as Mother, the head of household and an ardent practitioner of sh’chur.
- Amos Lavi as Father (a.k.a. Eliahu Ben Shoshan), a patriarch who provides for the family despite being blind from birth.
- Yaacov Cohen as Shlomo, the oldest brother of Rachel who helps run the household.
- Orly Tovali as Miriam, the oldest sister of Rachel who moved away to an Orthodox yeshiva.
- Uri Banay as Avram, the middle brother of Rachel who is sent to live on a kibbutz.
- Esti Yerushalmi as Zohara, the middle sister of Rachel who is forced to marry her uncle Moshe, 20 years her senior.
- Albert Iluz as Moshe, a middle-aged uncle who lives with the family and to whom Zohara (middle sister) is wed.

== Awards and nominations ==
Israeli Film Academy

- Ophir Award for Best Best Film - Sh'Chur (won)
- Ophir Award for Best Director - Shmuel Hasfari (won)
- Ophir Award for Screenplay - Hanna Azoulay-Hasfari (won)
- Ophir Award for Best Supporting Actor - Amos Lavi (won)
- Ophir Award for Best Supporting Actress - Ronit Elkabetz (won)

Berlin International Film Festival

- Special Mention - Shmuel Hasfari (for the special mix of magic and reality) (won)
- Golden Bear - Shmuel Hasfari (nomination)

== See also ==
- Jewish Mysticism
- Mizrahi Jews in Israel
- Magical Realism
- List of submissions to the 67th Academy Awards for Best Foreign Language Film
- List of Israeli submissions for the Academy Award for Best Foreign Language Film
