= Levana Finkelstein =

Israeli actress

- לבנה פינקלשטיין
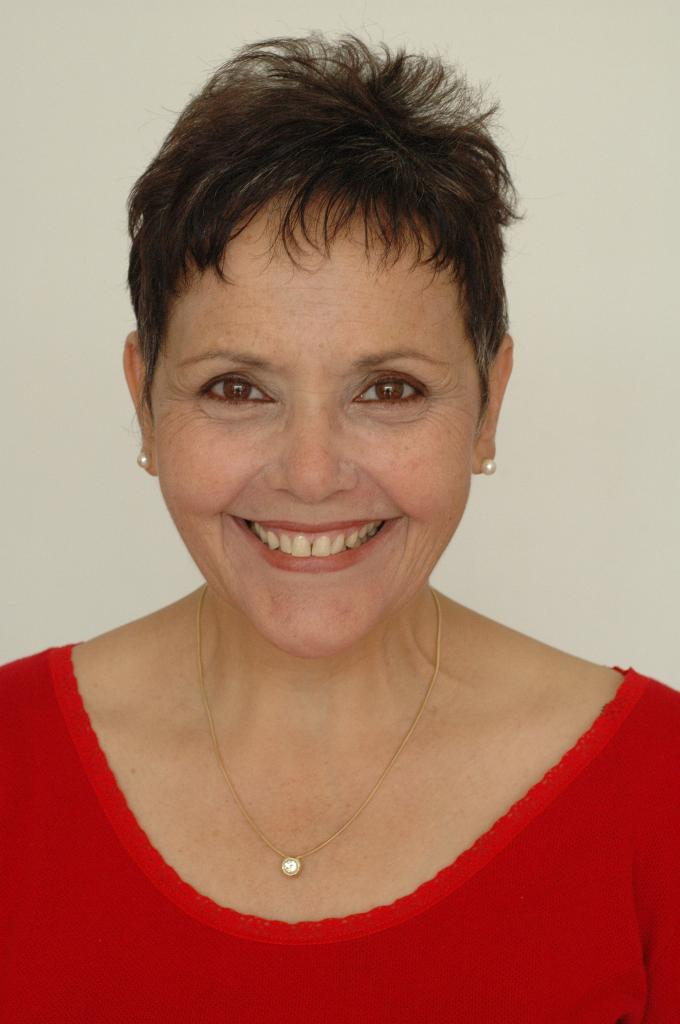
- Finkelstein in 2006
- Born: 21 September 1947 (age 79); Sofia, Bulgaria
- Occupations: Actress; sculptor
- Years active: 1969–present

Levana Finkelstein (Hebrew: לבנה פינקלשטיין; born 21 September 1947) is an Israeli actress and sculptor. She has appeared in more than thirty films since 1969.

== Biography ==
Levana Finkelstein was born in Sofia, Bulgaria. However, when she was just one year old, her family moved to Israel. She spent her youth in Tel Aviv. She studied acting at the Beit Zvi School of Performing Arts and in New York City. She then worked in theater before making her film debut in the 1969 drama *Margo Sheli*, directed by Menahem Golan, in which she played the lead role of Margo alongside Oded Teomi, Avner Hizkiyahu, and Abraham Ronai. Since then, she has established herself in both Israeli film and on Israeli theater stages. In 2009, she won the Israeli Ophir Award for Best Supporting Actress for her portrayal of Mona in Sharon Maymon and Erez Tadmor’s sports comedy Sumo – A Matter of Size, and in 2014, she was nominated for Best Actress for In the End, a Celebration.

As a sculptor, she creates bronze sculptures. A group of her sculptures symbolizing the bilateral friendship between Bulgaria and Israel was installed in 2005 in Sofia in the garden of the Bulgarian Ministry of Foreign Affairs.

== Selected filmography ==
Year	Title	Role	Notes
1972	I Love You Rosa	Jamila	
1978	Rocking Horse		
2005	The Mechanik	Mary Abramoff	
2006	Aviva, My Love	Violette	
2009	A Matter of Size	Mona Mesika	
2015	The Farewell Party		
