= Lior Miller =

- ליאור מילר
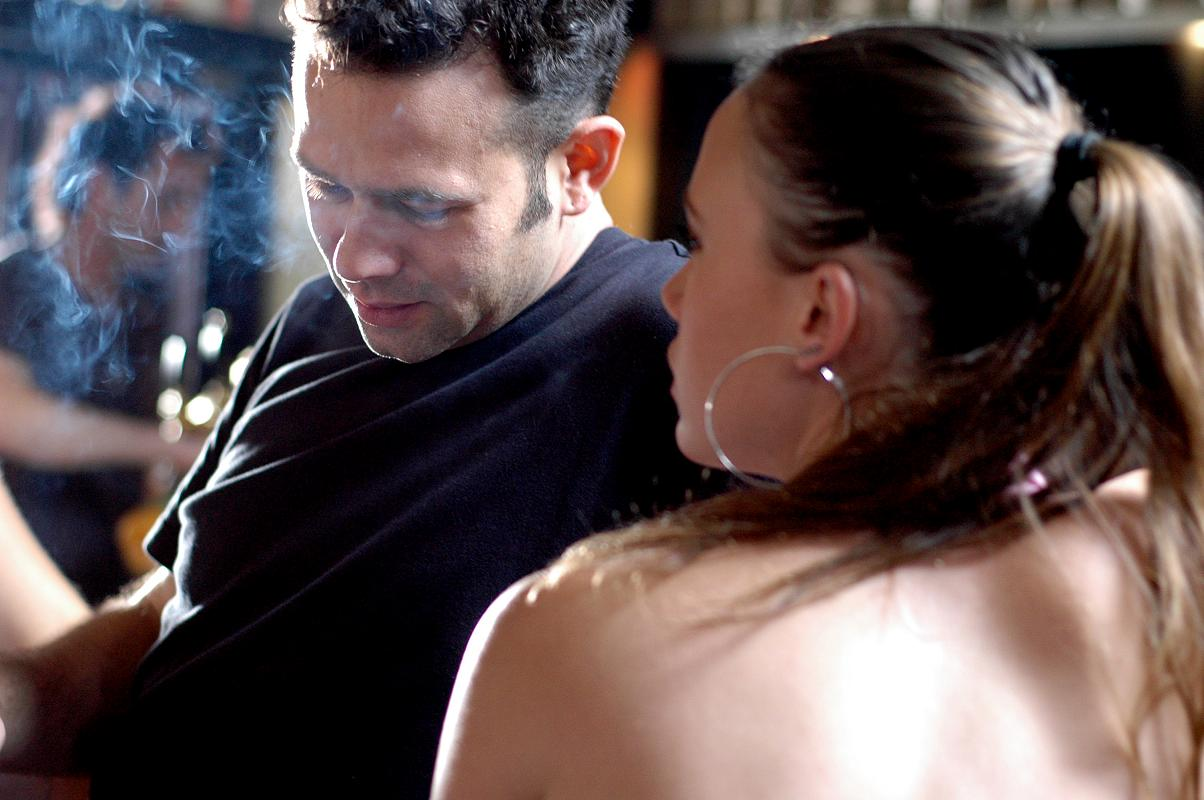
- Born: 13 February 1972 (age 54); Herzlia, Israel
- Occupations: Actor and model
- Years active: 1995–present

Lior Miller (Hebrew: ליאור מילר; born 13 February 1972) is an Israeli film and television actor, DJ, and model.

== Career ==
He was first discovered after appearing in a commercial for Castro clothing.

Miller later acted in the television series Ramat Aviv Gimel. He has also appeared on the Israeli version of the television series Dancing with the Stars.
