= Shmuel Hasfari =

Israeli playwright and screenwriter

- שמואל הספרי
- Born: August 26, 1954 (age 70); Ramat Gan, Israel
- Citizenship: Israeli
- Awards: Ophir Award
- Website: www.hasfari.net

Shmuel Hasfari (Hebrew: שמואל הספרי; born 26 August 1954) is an Israeli playwright and screenwriter. He was artistic director of the Cameri Theatre.

== Biography ==
Shmuel Hasfari was born in Ramat Gan to Holocaust survivor parents from Poland; theirs was a religious family. He began theater studies at Tel Aviv University but left to join an alternative theater company that won first prize at the Acco Festival of Alternative Israeli Theatre in 1982. Hasfari is married to actress and writer Hanna Azoulay Hasfari. They have three sons and live in Tel Aviv.

== Plays ==
His works include Kiddush, Shivaa, Hametz, Acordionim, Tashmad and Milano. Huppah Shchorah (Black Wedding Canopy) was performed in 1981 at the Acco Festival.

== Awards and recognition ==
Hasfari is considered one of Israel's leading playwrights. He won an Ophir Award for best director for his 1994 film, Sh'Chur. It was also the 1994 official Israeli submission for the Academy Award for Best Foreign Language Film.

His play, Isha. Ba-al. Bayit (The Master of the House) won a 2003 Award for Best Play in Israel,. While still running at the Cameri Theater, it had its American premiere at the Laguna Playhouse in March 2007, directed by Richard Stein.

== Personal life ==
Azoulay-Hasfari is married to the actress and screenwriter Hannah Azoulay-Hasfari. They have three children together.
