= List of Israeli films of 2012 =

A list of films produced by the Israeli film industry released in 2012.

Premiere		Title	Director	Cast	Genre	Notes	Ref
J A N	?	Heder 514 (Hebrew: חדר 514)	Sharon Bar-Ziv	Oren Farage, Ohad Hall, Hilly Israel	Drama		
J A N	12	Melting Away (Hebrew: נמס בגשם)	Doron Eran	Hen Yanni, Yonatan Barak, Limor Goldstein	Drama		
M A R	29	Chatulim Al Sirat Pedalim (Hebrew: חתולים על סירת פדלים)	Nadav Hollander, Yuval Mendelson	Nitay Dagan, Dana Frider and Michael Hanegbi	Comedy, Horror		
A P R	19	The Exchange (Hebrew: ההתחלפות)	Eran Kolirin	Rotem Keinan, Sharon Tal and Dov Navon	Drama		
M A Y	17	Ha-Sippur Shel Yossi (Hebrew: הסיפור של יוסי)	Eytan Fox	Lior Ashkenazi, Ohad Knoller, Orly Silbersatz Banai	Drama		
M A Y	17	The Slut (Hebrew: הנותנת)	Hagar Ben-Asher	Hagar Ben-Asher, Ishai Golan and Icho Avital	Drama		
J U N	27	Alice (Hebrew: אליס)	Dana Goldberg	Ilanit Ben-Yaakov, Daria Shezaf, Neta Bar-Rafael	Drama		
J U L	?	The World Is Funny (Hebrew: העולם מצחיק)	Shemi Zarhin	Eli Finish, Asi Levi, Danny Steg	Drama		
J U L	12	The Dealers (Hebrew: הדילרים)	Oded Davidoff	Alon Aboutboul, Moshe Ashkenazi, Rami Davidoff	Comedy		
S E P	27	Single Plus (Hebrew: רווקה פלוס)	Dover Koshashvili	Mati Atlas, Moti Giladi and Mickey Leon	Comedy		

== Announced/Unscheduled releases ==
Title	Director	Cast	Genre	Notes	Ref
The Wild Bunch	Alexander Williams	Abigail Breslin, Willem Dafoe, Chris Klein, Elizabeth Hurley, Willie Nelson	Animation	Israeli-American co-production; The first feature length CGI animation film produced in Israel.	
Song Number 6	Eytan Fox	Dana Ivgy, Efrat Dor, Ofer Shechter	Comedy		
Not in Tel Aviv (Hebrew: לא בתל אביב)	Nony Geffen	Romi Aboulafia, Rotem Bar Or, Liat Bein	Comedy, Crime, Drama		
Fill the Void	Rama Burshtein				
Eagles	Dror Sabo				

== Notable deaths ==
- December 9 – Anat Gov (born 1953), Israeli playwright and scriptwriter.
- December 16 – Avraham Mor (born 1938), Israeli actor

== See also ==
- 2012 in Israel
