= List of Israeli films of 2011 =

A list of films produced by the Israeli film industry released in 2011.

Premiere		Title	Director	Cast	Genre	Notes	Ref
F B R	17	Lipstikka (Hebrew: אודם)	Jonathan Sagall	Clara Khoury, Nataly Attiya, Daniel Caltagirone	Drama, Thriller	Premiered In Competition at the 61st Berlin International Film Festival; nominated for the Golden Bear.	
M A R	10	The Flood (Hebrew: מבול)	Guy Nattiv	Shmil Ben Ari, Yakov Cohen and Ronit Elkabetz	Drama		
M A Y	14	Footnote (Hebrew: הערת שוליים, lit. "Footnote")	Joseph Cedar	Lior Ashkenazi, Yuval Scharf, Shlomo Bar-Aba	Drama		
A U G	25	The Exchange (Hebrew: ההתחלפות)	Eran Kolirin	Rotem Keinan, Sharon Tal and Dov Navon	Drama		
S E P	5	The Flat	Arnon Goldfinger		Documentary		
O C T	20	Restoration (Hebrew: בוקר טוב אדון פידלמן, lit. "Good morning, Mr. Fidelman")	Yossi Madmoni	Henry David, Sarah Adler and Sasson Gabai	Drama		
N O V	24	Playoff (Hebrew: פלייאוף)	Eran Riklis	Danny Huston	Drama	* Israeli-French-German co-production	

== See also ==
- 2011 in Israel
