= Jonathan Bar Giora =

Israeli composer and pianist

Jonathan Bar Giora יונתן בר גיורא
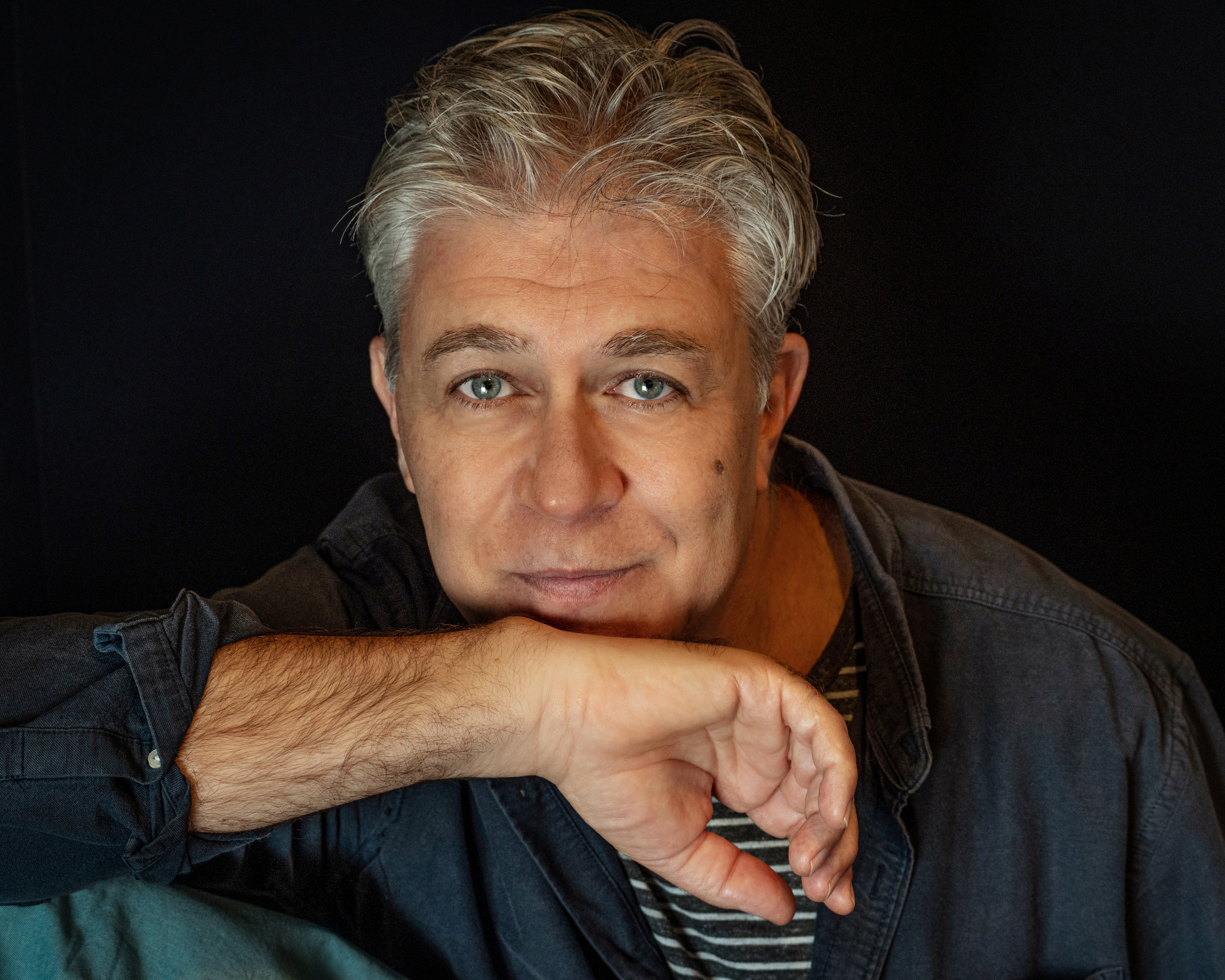

Background information
- Born: 8 June 1962 (age 64); Jerusalem
- Occupation: Composer
- Instruments: Piano, Keyboards
- Years active: 1990–present

Jonathan Bar Giora (Hebrew: יונתן בר גיורא; born 8 July 1962) is an Israeli composer and pianist. Since 2000, Bar Giora has composed scores and soundtracks for over 150 Israeli films such as Bonjour Monsieur Shlomi, Time of Favor, A Quiet Heart and Aviva, My Love. He also worked as a composer and music arranger and producer with Israeli artists such as Yossi Banai, Shalom Hanoch, Riki Gal, Miri Mesika and many others.

From 2011 until 2015, Bar Giora served as the head of the film music and sound design department at the School of Audio & Visual Arts at Sapir Academic College, where he is now the head of the BFA program. He also teaches at Beit Berl College.

His composition style presents diverse influences, from Mizrahi music, Jazz, Classical music, Rock music to Electronic music.

He has collaborated with various Israeli musicians, such as Meir Banai, Riki Gal, Haïm Ulliel, Miri Mesika, Yehonatan Geffen, Ninet Tayeb and Ester Rada.

== Biography ==
Jonathan Bar Giora was born in Jerusalem, Israel, in 1962. When he was 16, he left high school and started playing in local piano bars. All through the 1980s he played jazz and wrote music-related articles for the local press. In 1990 he staged a one-man show I'd be delighted to meet you after the plague, which he wrote, composed and performed (Director: Shlomo Vazana). A secondary character in that show, Michel Clayderlast, became successful when Bar Giora created "Live Elevator Music". A performance-art show debuted at the 1990 Israel Festival, featuring Clayderlast playing 20-second bits of popular music live inside in elevator (20 seconds is the average time elevator users spend inside). In 1991 he staged Erua Mochi, a rock spectacle presenting a new musical style: "Live Acid". The band, led by Bar Giora, played looped music live in an attempt to reduce fears among live musicians, at a time when electronic and sampled music threatened to wipe all their job opportunities.

1992 was dedicated to Jesse's Carnival, a gloomy cabaret show with singer-songwriter Jonathan Licht.

In 1993, Bar Giora created a Fringe theatre show, Entebbe - The Musical with Etgar Keret. Bar Giora composed all of the songs and original score, and the show won first prize at Acco Festival of Alternative Israeli Theatre. The rest of the 90s were dedicated to theater music, TV work (musical director of Ad Eser, a weekly talk show with Merav Michaeli, music for Meni Peer's TV show, and many others). In 1999 he wrote the music for Pgisha Leiyn Kets, a special CD dedicated to the poetry of Nathan Alterman, read by one Israel's leading actors Yossi Banai. That same year he composed Joseph Cedar's feature film Time of Favor. It was a first in a series of more than 150 movie scores (TV dramas and documentaries included) he composed from 2000 on. In August 2018 the Tel Aviv, Jerusalem & Haifa Cinematheques held a special tribute to his work for films and television.

In August 2018 Helicon released the album Themes (in Hebrew: "תֵּמוֹת"), the first anthology of music composed by Bar Giora for films.

Early in 2020 the Israeli Andalusian Orchestra dedicated a concert to Bar Giora's works titled "Soundtrack of the Heart" (in Hebrew: "פסקול הלב"). That same year Bar Giora won The Israeli Documentary Filmmakers Forum Award for best score for his "Spotting Yossi"'s original score (In Hebrew להאיר את יוסי).

== Selected works ==
Original Soundtrack for Feature-Length Films

- 'Time of Favor' - 2000 (Best Film - Israeli Academy Awards)
- 'Bonjour Monsieur Shlomi' - 2003
- No Longer 17 - 2003 (Best Film - Haifa International Film Festival)
- Henry's Dream - 2003
- Summer Story - 2003
- Close to Home - 2005
- Petits Héros (Little Heroes) - 2006
- Love & Dance - 2006
- Aviva, My Love - 2006 (Best Film - Israeli Academy Awards)
- The Debt - 2007
- The World is Funny - 2012
- Between Worlds - 2015
- A Quiet Heart - 2016
- Silent - 2022
- The Good Person - 2022

Original Soundtrack for Television Movies and Television Series

- Poker Face - 2001
- Run (Ani Purim) - 2001
- Overseas - 2001
- Levana My Darling - 2002
- Meorav Yerushalmi - 3 Seasons, 2003–2010 (Best Drama Series - Israeli Academy Awards)
- Ha-Yeladim Mi'Givat Napoleon - 2004 (Best Children's Drama Series - Israeli Academy Awards)
- Until Tomorrow Comes - 2004
- Room Service - 2009, 21 episodes
- Allah Islam - 2012
- Great Hopes - 2013, 3 episodes
- Lost (Israeli Television Series) - 2013–2019, 41 episodes

Original Soundtrack for Feature Length Documentaries

- Heart of the Land - 2001
- For My Children - 2002
- Uri Avnery: Warrior of Peace - 2002
- Purity: Breaking the Codes of Silence - 2002
- My 100 Children - 2003
- Sacred - 2004 (Best Documentary - Jerusalem Film Festival)
- Shalom Abu Bassem - 2004
- Say Amen - 2004
- Quest for the Missing Piece - 2007
- Three times Divorced - 2007 (Best Picture - Docaviv)
- House of Love - 2007
- To See If I'm Smiling - 2007 (Best Documentart - International Documentary Film Festival Amsterdam)
- The Go-Go Boys: The Inside Story of Cannon Films - 2014 (Cannes Film Festival)
- Cinema: a Public Affair - 2015 ((Berlin International Film Festival)
- The Ancestral Sin - 2017 (Best Direction and Research - Docaviv; Best Film - Israeli Documentary Filmmakers Forum
- You Only Die Twice - 2018 (Audience's Choice and Best Research - Docaviv)
- Wild Kids - 2018 (Audience's Choice- Jerusalem Film Festival)
- Spotting Yossi - 2019 (Winner of The Israeli Documentary Filmmakers Forum Award for best score 2020)
- Queen Shoshana - 2021 (Nominated for The Israeli Documentary Filmmakers Forum Award for best score 2021)

Original Music for Theatre

- I'd Be Delighted to See You After the Plague. Directed by Shlomo Vazana. The Pargod Theatre, 1990
- Michelle Kleiderlast's Elevator Show. Israel Festival, 1990
- Operation Entebbe: The Musical. Written by Jonathan Bar Giora and Etgar Keret. Directed by Shlomo Vazana. Acco Festival of Alternative Israeli Theatre, 1993
- Confetti D'Rembrandt. Directed by Moshe Naor. Nissan Nativ Acting Studio, 1997
- Jungul. Written by Boaz Gaon. Directed by Moshe Naor. Tzavta Theatre, 2000
- Soldier Returns Home. Directed by Oded Kotler. Tzavta Short Theatre Festival, 2001
- Personal Details. Directed by Elit Veber. Acco Festival of Alternative Israeli Theatre, 2005

Music Albums

- Endless Meeting - Yossi Banai Reads Alterman, 1999
- Slowly - Yossi Banai, 2001
- Yossi Banai Reads Psalms, 2005
- Yehonatan Geffen - Saying Love Songs, 2009
- Endless Meeting - Yossi Banai Reads Alterman, 2010 - A new release, re-mixed with three additional never-before-released tracks
- Themes - First Anthology of Movie Soundtracks, 2018
- Bonjour Monsieur Shlomi - The Soundtrack, 2003
- Aviva, My Love - The Soundtrack, 2006
- Bringing the Fairies Back - Collaboration with Shez, 2020
- Spotting Yossi - The Soundtrack, 2020
- Queen Shoshana - Soundtrack album, 2022
- Middle Eastern Soul Second film scores compilation, 2022

Original Music for Video-Art and Musical Works

- Closed Circuit - Created by Miri Segal. Also shown at Museum of Modern Art (MoMA), New-York, 2000
- EG - Created by Miri Segal. Tel Aviv Museum of Art, 2000
- fORESHADOWIN - Created by Miri Segal. Also shown at Museum of Modern Art (MoMA), New-York, 2001
- Human/Adam Temple - Music for a permanent display, Tel Aviv Museum of Art
- PIXEL TOUCH - Created by Jonathan Bar Giora and Miri Segal. First shown at the Viral Festival, 2020
