= Boston Jewish Film Festival =

Boston Jewish Film
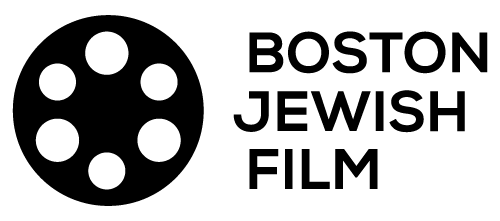
- Location: Boston, United States
- Founded: 1989
- Founded by: Michal Goldman
- Language: International
- Website: bostonjfilm.org

The Boston Jewish Film Festival (BJFF) is an annual film festival that screens the best contemporary films on Jewish themes from around the world. The festival presents features, shorts, documentaries, and conversations with visiting artists in order to explore Jewish identity, the current Jewish experience and the richness of Jewish culture in relation to a diverse modern world.

== History ==
Founded by filmmaker Michal Goldman in 1989, the Boston Jewish Film Festival has grown from 10 screenings to more than 60 throughout the Boston area including Brookline, Newton, Somerville and Cambridge with venues such as the Museum of Fine Arts and the Coolidge Corner Theatre. In the past 30 years, the Festival has presented more than 800 films - many of them US or Massachusetts premieres – and welcomed hundreds of thousands of audience members. Many of the films that have been shown have gone on to be nominated for, or win, Academy Awards including The Pianist (winner, Best Director, Best Actor, and Best Adapted Screenplay, 2002), Nowhere in Africa (winner, Best Foreign Film, 2002) and The Personals (winner, Best Short-Subject Documentary, 1998).

== Film submission criteria ==
The Annual Festival is a non-competitive event, although since 2002 it has offered audience members the opportunity to cast ballots for Favorite Documentary, Feature Film and Short Film. It screens International and American independent films and videos that highlight the Jewish experience; deal with themes of Jewish culture, heritage or history; and films of particular interest to the Jewish community. The Festival also presents narrative, documentary, animated and experimental works. Projects must be completed in 35mm, 16mm, Beta or 1/2 inch format. They can be of any length, but must not have previously been screened in the Boston area.

== Year-round programs ==
Boston Jewish Film has grown from presenting films once a year at the annual festival to a flourishing year-round arts organization, with programs and screenings taking place nearly every month. Since 1998, the Festival has presented more than 275 films and welcomed another 75,000+ audience members outside the November Festival. This also includes a Summer Cinematheque series featuring new films presented in July and August.

=== Annual November festival ===
The twelve day event each November showcasing the best contemporary films from around the world on Jewish themes, accompanied by visiting filmmakers, panel discussions, musical events and more.

=== Boston Israeli Film Festival ===
For the first time in 2019, Boston Jewish Film presented the Boston Israeli Film Festival which included documentary, comedy, drama and children's films.

=== ReelAbilities Film Festival Boston ===
In 2011, Boston Jewish Film became the host for ReelAbilities Boston, Boston's disability film festival.

=== Pre-release and word-of-mouth screenings ===
Boston Jewish Film often presents a special advance screening, sometimes with a visiting filmmaker or actor. Other times, members are offered free tickets to word-of-mouth screenings at a local theater. These screenings are chances to see films before the general public.

=== Co-presentations ===
Boston Jewish Film works with other film festivals throughout the year to bring quality films to the Boston area. Recent and ongoing partners include the Boston French Film Festival, the Boston LGBT Film Festival, the Independent Film Festival of Boston and the Roxbury International Film Festival.

=== Curated series and programs ===
From time to time, the Boston Jewish Film Festival curates a special series either independently or in conjunction with another organization. These series are often thematically based and have included a series focusing on the question of censorship and freedom of expression as part of the New Center for Arts and Culture's multi-disciplinary citywide exhibition Words on Fire, as well as a series celebrating pioneering Jewish women in America in conjunction with Jewish Women's Archive.

=== Recognition ===
In 1999, the Boston Jewish Film Festival was named “Best Film Series” by the Boston Society of Film Critics.

In 2003, Artistic Director Kaj Wilson and Executive Director Sara Rubin were honored with Image Awards for Vision and Excellence by Women in Film & Video in New England.

In 2004, it hosted the 4th Conference of Jewish Film Festivals, welcoming Jewish Film Festival directors from around the globe to Boston.

In 2006, Executive Director Sara L. Rubin was recognized and honored for her career and her dedication to French culture by the French Minister of Culture by being introduced into France's Order of Arts and Letters, with the rank of Chevalier (Knight).

In 2007, departing Artistic Director Kaj Wilson was honored for her work by a commendation from the Boston Society of Film Critics.

== Winners ==
Year	Best Feature Fiction	Director	Best Documentary	Director
2013	The Jewish Cardinal	Ilan Duran Cohen	Life According to Sam	Sean Fine, Andrea Nix Fine
2012	Melting Away	Doron Eran	Hitler's Children	Chanoch Zeevi
2011	Kaddish for a Friend	Leo Khasin	Beating Time	Odette Orr
2010	Saviors in the Night	Ludi Boeken	My So-Called Enemy	Lisa Gossels
2009	Eli & Ben	Ori Ravid	Killing Kasztner: The Jew Who Dealt with Nazis	Gaylen Ross
2008	Noodle	Ayelet Menahemi	Holy Land Hardball	Brett Rapkin and Erik Keston
2007	Beaufort (Bufor)	Joseph Cedar	Praying with Lior	Ilana Trachtman
2006	Ira and Abby	Robert Cary	The Rape of Europa	Richard Berge, Nicole Newnham, and Bonni Cohen
2005	Live and Become	Radu Mihaileanu	39 Pounds of Love	Dani Menkin
2004	Wondrous Oblivion	Paul Morrison	Watermarks	Yaron Zilberman
2003	Yossi and Jagger	Eytan Fox	Thunder in Guyana	Suzanne Wasserman
2002	Monsieur Batignole	Gérard Jugnot	Strange Fruit	Joel Katz
