= List of Israeli films of the 2010s =

The following are lists of films produced in Israel in the 2010s:

- List of Israeli films of 2010
- List of Israeli films of 2011
- List of Israeli films of 2012
- List of Israeli films of 2013
- List of Israeli films of 2014
- List of Israeli films of 2015
- List of Israeli films of 2016
- List of Israeli films of 2017
- List of Israeli films of 2018
- List of Israeli films of 2019

== See also ==
- Cinema of Israel
