= Farewell Herr Schwarz =

2014 German-Israeli documentary about Holocaust survivor

- Onesheet for US release
- German: Schnee von gestern, Hebrew: היה שלום פטר שווארץ
- Directed by: Yael Reuveny
- Written by: Yael Reuveny
- Produced by: Melanie Andernach
- Starring: Peter Schwarz, Etty Reuveny, Oded Reuveny, Yael Reuveny, Uwe Schwarz
- Narrated by: Yael Reuveny
- Cinematography: Andreas Köhler
- Edited by: Nicole Kortlüke, Assaf Lapid
- Music by: Hauschka
- Production companies: Black Sheep Film Productions, Made in Germany Filmproduktion
- Distributed by: Kino Lorber
- Release date: April 10, 2014 (Germany)
- Running time: 96 minutes
- Countries: Germany, Israel
- Languages: English, German, Hebrew
- Box office: $4,400

Farewell Herr Schwarz (German: Schnee von gestern (lit. 'snow from yesterday'), Hebrew: היה שלום פטר שווארץ (Farewell Peter Schwarz)) is a 2014 German–Israeli documentary film by Yael Reuveny, in her directorial debut. In it she attempts to answer for herself and her family why her great-uncle, a Holocaust survivor, chose to resettle in East Germany afterwards and start a family there, a life her family in Israel only learned about after his death in the late 1980s. In the process of talking to his family, her family, and visiting the home in Vilnius where her great-uncle and grandmother lived with their family before the war, Reuveny considers issues of forgiveness, reconciliation and the effect of the Holocaust on the third generation of survivors, from her own perspective as an Israeli expatriate in Germany.

Separated before the war, Reuveny's great-uncle Feivush "Feiv'ke" Schwarz and his sister Michla, both Lithuanian Jews, had agreed to meet at the train station in Łódź, Poland, if they survived. They were only two members of their family to do so and were in the city in 1945, but the meeting never took place and both assumed the other had died. Michla eventually immigrated to Israel and raised a family there, including Reuveny's mother Etty. Feiv'ke settled near the concentration camp he had been held in, in what later became East Germany, and raised a family as well, but never identified as a Jew, taking the name Peter for himself.

The film was released in Germany in April 2014. It has won several awards, including Best Documentary at the Haifa International Film Festival and the DEFA Award at Dok Leipzig. American critics have also responded favorably to the film, after its release there the following year.

== Synopsis ==
The film begins with Reuveny talking about herself and her background, describing herself as an Israeli descendant of Holocaust survivors. Footage showing her on a tram in wintry surroundings gradually reveals, along with her narration, that she lives in Germany, which she admits is an unusual choice. This is followed by an interview with her parents at her family home in Israel. Her father Shauli is of Iraqi-Jewish background, while her mother Etty is the daughter of Michla Schwarz, a Lithuanian Jew who immigrated to Israel after surviving the concentration camps. Her parents have some difficulty coping with the fact that she lives in Germany, especially when she refers to it as "home".

Reuveny next shows the only surviving photograph of the Schwarz family in Vilnius from before the war. In it her grandmother is shown seated next to her brother Feivush, known by the diminutive Feiv'ke. When German invaded Lithuania in 1941, he was conscripted into military service. The two made a vow that after the war ended, if possible, they would meet at the train station in the Polish city of Łódź.

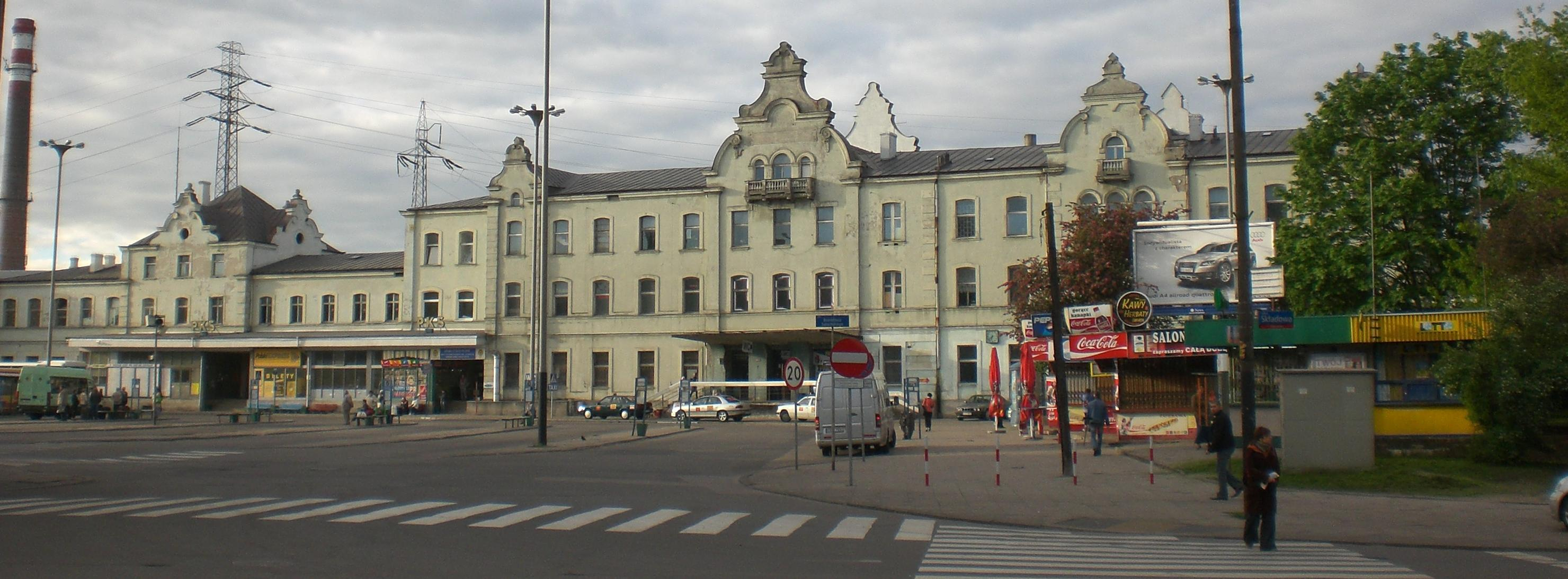
The now-demolished station in Łódź, where Feiv'ke and Michla Schwarz were supposed to reunite in 1945

Through interviews with her mother and Michla's friends, Reuveny tells her grandmother's story. She survived the ghetto and later deportation to concentration camps, the only member of her family to do so. She made her way to Łódź after the war, where a stranger she encountered, upon confirming her identity, told her Feiv'ke had been taken as a prisoner of war and survived. He would indeed meet her at the station the following evening. But when it came time to take her to the station, the same stranger told her that Feiv'ke had been among refugees killed the night before by Polish nationalists resentful of the influx in the aftermath of the war. She instead began the journey that would ultimately end with her settling in what soon became Israel.

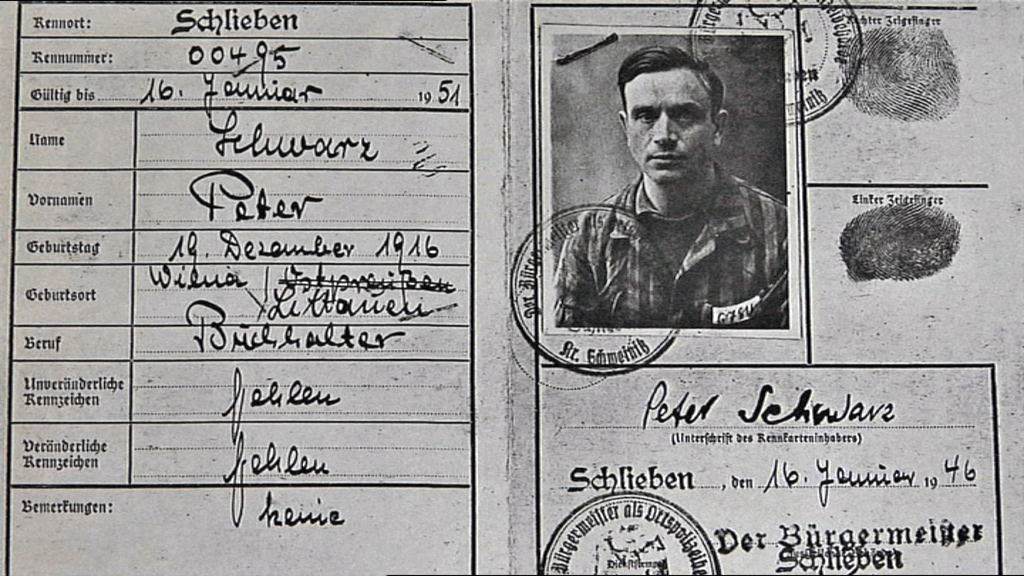
An identity card issued to Peter Schwarz at Schlieben in 1946

Unbeknownst to Michla, Feiv'ke had survived—and had been in Łódź at that same time, where he was told that she along with the rest of the Vilnius Schwarzes had perished. He returned to Schlieben, where he had been held in a satellite camp of Buchenwald after it was liberated by the Red Army in the last months of the war, and began settling there. Reuveny travels there, visits his grave and interviews friends and family members, some of whom live in the former camp's barracks, repurposed as housing. She describes him as "liv[ing] like he were the last Jew on Earth" as he rebuilt his life in what became East Germany. He took the name Peter, joined the ruling Socialist Unity Party and married a Gentile woman. She had a brother who had served in the Wehrmacht and got along very well with Peter. He never acknowledged his Jewish background, and regularly celebrated Christmas with his relatives. In 1987 he died, with "Comrade Peter Schwarz" inscribed on the gravestone.

Eight years later, Peter's son Uwe, searching for his father's possible relatives, sent Michla a letter in Israel. She had her daughter read it and, after comprehending that her brother may have lived out his life in East Germany, asked if he had at least married a Jewish woman. When Etty told Michla he had not, she recalls that she answered "Then I don't want to know", and never discussed him again.

Uwe Schwarz tells Reuveny about his life growing up, recalling how his father became very angry one day when he and his siblings went into the nearby woods and played around some ruins of the camp. That was the first time he came to understand that Peter had been an inmate there. Together, he and Reuveny travel to Vilnius and find the former family home, abandoned and neglected. She meets another cousin, Stefan Kummer, who works at the Jewish Museum in Berlin and has embraced his Jewish identity.

Uwe tells Reuveny that he wants to have his father moved to a Jewish cemetery and buried under his birth name. "You think [he] would want that?" she asks. Later, Reuveny is shown placing rocks from Peter's gravesite on Michla's tombstone, at Uwe's request. Kummer is shown in Jerusalem, buying himself a kippa and praying at the Western Wall. Reuveny's parents, in turn, visit her in Berlin. She ponders what all these discoveries about her family history mean for herself. "How much am I allowed to forget?" she asks.

== Themes ==
Reuveny was finishing her studies at Jerusalem's Sam Spiegel Film and Television School in 2005 when she went to Germany on vacation. "[F]or Jews who grew up in Israel[,] Germany is such a strong symbol," she recalled. "It was fairly common for whole families to say, 'We don't go there. We don't buy products from there.'" But that stigma also made Germany attractive as a "forbidden place". She settled there, despite the unhappiness it caused her parents, joined a growing community of young Israeli expatriates, a group she characterizes some Israeli politicians as calling a "spoiled generation ... giving up the Zionist project for cheap beer," a response she considers overly cynical.

She knew she wanted to make her first film there, exploring the ways the past lives in the present. "Berlin is a very contemporary city, very young and hip, but haunted," she told The Jewish Week. You feel you're walking in history constantly. "As a young person who is somehow haunted [by that history], I could identify with that." Germans, she saw, were also obsessed with the Holocaust in the same way as Israelis:

Germans dealt with it and it's part of their biography, so people my age they grew up with it in a weird way, the same way that I did. We have National Holocaust Day. It's part of the national identity. In Germany, it's the same. In a way, it's like the other side of the mirror.

From her childhood, Reuveny had always been "fascinated" by her grandmother's account of her missed meeting with her brother. "[She] took that one day, unearthed it and examined it, like an artifact at an archaeological site," she said later. "These banal moments were broken down and reconstructed again, until they became the backbone of our family story." When she decided to make that story the basis of her first feature film, she realized after bringing his life in East Germany to light that it was not enough merely to tell the story, since so many of the stories had been told in the 65 years since the end of the war and inside them there was "a core that I cannot touch."

Her attitude toward her great-uncle had evolved during the filmmaking process as well. Originally, she told The Forward, she had been "judgemental" toward the man who became Peter Schwarz. But as she began considering his story, she realized "that in a way [my grandmother]'s choices were just as strange as his," since while she left the place where her family suffered, in Israel she was surrounded by other survivors who "reflected her pain." Perhaps for Peter, on the other hand, "there was a certain kind of release or freedom in not meeting people who went through similar things? Maybe he made the healthier choices?"

Reuveny says that ultimately Farewell Herr Schwarz is not about the Holocaust or even her grandmother and great-uncle, "but about us, their children and grandchildren." She likens the war to the Big Bang, "a moment in time from which a family will start counting." And in order to contextualize themselves, they will tell stories about themselves in that war. "In this film I did what we all do," she explains. "[W]e take our family stories, we disassemble them and put them together again, lie to ourselves sometimes, until we reclaim them—so we can deal with what we have inherited."

== Production ==
A year after arriving in Berlin, Reuveny realized that the story of the past the city made her want to tell would have to be her own family's story. She went to Schlieben and a made a half-hour short documentary, Tales of the Defeated, which won several awards and received some notice on its 2009 release.

Farewell Herr Schwarz took her four more years to film. For the interview segments, she told cinematographer Andreas Köhler, who used only available light, to include subjects' surroundings in a "very static" way that evoked portraits. "We were talking a bit about the, remember The Simpsons opening scene where at the end they sit on this sofa?" she recalled to The Times of Israel. "That's what I wanted."

Reuveny recalls the two-hour interview with her mother, filmed in 2012, as the most difficult part of the filmmaking process for her. After her interviews in Germany, Poland and Lithuania went well, Köhler and producer Melanie Andernach told her she had to go back to Israel and interview her mother. She resisted at first, believing Etty would make a difficult subject and little of use would come from the shoot, a perception that persisted when she actually did sit down at the family home in Petah Tikva and filmed her conversation with her mother.

Later, she realized, "the real problem wasn't my mother. The problem was me." During the interview she had characterized her own behavior as "acting like a teenager." Convinced the time and film had been almost completely wasted, she stayed out of the editing room when it came time to review it and let Israeli editor Assaf Lapid consider whether it was worthy of inclusion. He texted her several hours later that the footage was "pure gold."

"[I]t quickly became clear that this one interview, and through it my mother as a character," she recalled in an Indiewire blog post, "was going to be the emotional pillar of the film ... My mother was smart, sharp, precise, exposed, emotional, funny, and tough." It succeeded not only in the context of the film but for her personally. "[I]t was a moment of growing up. It was the moment I met my own mother. A person who in a way, I had never really met before."

The filming resulted in 130 hours of raw footage. Lapid worked in Israel while Nicole Kortlüke edited in Germany. Their work proved invaluable in making the film tell its story. "In a certain way, the script was written in the editing room," Reuveny said.

== Reception ==
The film was released in Germany on April 10, 2014, under the title Schnee von gestern, an idiomatic expression meaning "yesterday's snow" (English: Water under the bridge. Critics there were positive. Frankfurter Rundschau called it "a thoughtful documentary that takes the time necessary to dismantle the myths and track their impact." "This film would be the ideal theater of tomorrow," wrote Andreas Platthaus in Frankfurter Allgemeine Zeitung, who called it a masterpiece.

Nine months later, on January 9, 2015, the film was released in the United States by Kino Lorber. It received largely positive reviews. Based on 11 reviews there, the aggregator site Rotten Tomatoes gave it a 91% score; responses by 84 viewers averaged at 60%. Metacritic, another such site, gave it a 72, meaning "generally favorable", based on critical reviews; it has not had any audience members submit reviews to the site.

Variety's Ella Taylor gave the film its strongest review, according to Metacritic. "[It] defines what a good Holocaust documentary should be, but only rarely is—a question without definitive answers, sustained by informed conjecture and with due diligence to collateral emotional wreckage," she wrote. "In Reuveny's subtle hands, any uplift to emerge from this extraordinary tale is earned, not gratuitously extracted."

Jordan Hoffman, who had interviewed Reuveny for The Times of Israel prior to the film's release, praised its technique in his review for the New York Daily News. "The film is rich with artfully framed interviews of newly discovered family members," he wrote. "Even the music and finely observed interiors are so cinematic that you often forget this is a documentary."

However, for The Hollywood Reporter's Frank Scheck, those interviews that Köhler had so carefully staged were a detriment, making the film "static at times". He nevertheless found the film as a whole "an endlessly intriguing, and resonant, true-life family mystery", with its narrative shortcomings forgivable in light of its subject. "While viewers will no doubt be left frustrated by the lack of neat resolutions, it's a vivid reminder of the messy aftereffects that inevitably resulted from the horrific events."

In The New York Times, Jeanne Catsoulis suggested that Reuveny's lack of inquisitiveness in some areas was partly to blame for that inconclusiveness, however. "The more we learn about Peter," she observed, "the more we wonder why his political affiliations are never explored. Was his seeming rejection of Judaism, and forgiveness of his persecutors, a consequence of embracing communism?" On the whole, though, she praised the film's "stumbling curiosity and endearing sincerity."

Slant Magazine's Wes Greene was the least impressed with the film of the 11 reviewers aggregated by Metacritic, giving it only three and a half out of five stars. He found it strongest on the issues of identity, benefiting from Reuveny's rapport with her subjects. But their "anecdotes of near-poetic intuitiveness" were undermined by "a frustratingly conventional approach to narrative and form that threatens to undermine their impact." As the focus of the narrative later in the film shifts more to Reuveny herself, Greene complained, "[she] seemingly abandons her attentiveness to the psychological effects of her family's history ... [I]n any exploration into the annals of history, the quality of the tour guide makes a greater difference than one may realize."

The film's domestic release was limited to two theaters, where it ran for a week. Total box office grosses were just under $4,500. It was released on DVD June 9, 2015.

== See also ==
- List of German films of the 2010s
- List of Holocaust films
- List of Israeli films of the 2010s
- Olim L'Berlin, a Facebook page promoting life in Berlin to young Israelis that caused controversy
