= Tova Ascher =

Israeli filmmaker

- טובה אשר
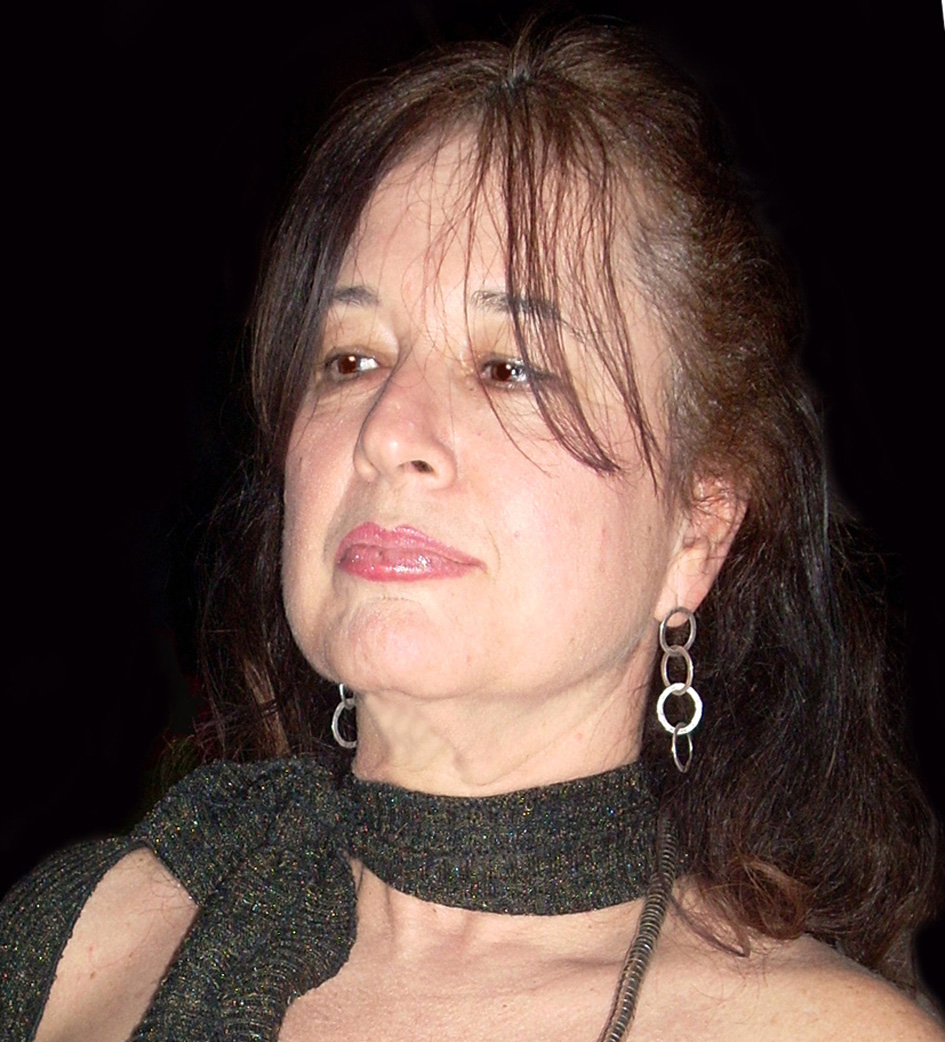
- Tova Ascher, 2010
- Born: Netanya, Central District, Israel
- Occupations: Film director, Film editor
- Years active: 1981–present
- Notable work: A.K.A Nadia, Time of Favor

Tova Ascher, also Tova Asher (Hebrew: טובה אשר) is an Israeli film director and film editor. She edited over 50 films.

== Biography ==
Tova Ascher was born in Netanya. Her sister, Era Lapid, is also a film editor. After graduating from the Netanya High School, she moved to Tel Aviv, where she received a bachelor's degree in philosophy and sociology from Tel Aviv University. She is married to Yoni Ascher, a historian at the University of Haifa and they have two children, also involved in the film industry: a daughter (part-time screenwriter) and a son (film director and editor).

== Film career ==
She began her career as film editor of the Hebrew-language version of Diamonds. In 2015, The Jerusalem Post described her as one of Israel’s most in-demand film editors. British magazine Screen Daily describes her as "one of Israel's most respected film editors." Ascher says her interest in film-making began when Lapid recommended her as an assistant editor in David Perlov's 1972 film The Pill.

== Selected filmography ==
Films that earned awards for Tova Asher are marked with stars.

- 2015*: A.K.A Nadia (director and screenwriter)
- 2010: The Human Resources Manager (editor)
- 2008: Lemon Tree (film) (editor)
- 2008: Spring 1941 (editor)
- 2006: Three Mothers (2006 film) (editor)
- 2004: The Syrian Bride (editor)
- 2003: No Longer 17 (editor)
- 2000*: ההסדר ("The Arrangement"), English title: Time of Favor (editor)
- 1998: Circus Palestine (editor)
- 1989: One of Us (editor)
- 1988*: Fictitious Marriage (editor)
- 1986: Bar 51 (editor)
- 1986: The Lover (editor)
- 1984: Beyond the Walls (editor)
- 1983: A Married Couple (editor)
- 1982: Noa at 17 (editor)
- 1981: Indian in the Sun (editor)

== Awards and recognition ==
- 1988: Fictitious Marriage, Silver Lamp Award (Note: The "Silver Lamp" Award (Hebrew: פרסי מנורת הכסף) preceded the Ophir Award, see, e.g., a remark in "Actor Yosef Carmon passed away at the age of 88") for editing
- 2000: Time of Favor, Ophir Award for best editing
- 2006: Three Mothers nominated for Ophir Award for best editing
- 2008: Lemon Tree nominated Ophir Award for best editing
- 2015: A.K.A Nadia:
- 2015 Israel Critics’ Forum Award for best feature film at the Jerusalem Film Festival. Jury motivation: "...for a profound and articulate discussion of issues of identity and belonging to a place and a family. The director offers an intricate portrait of a reality that is grounded in separation walls, checkpoints and segregation. The film examines whether one can create oneself anew within a tragic political context, by presenting a fascinating, complex and touching human story."
- 2017 Micki Moore Award (to the Best Narrative Feature Film directed by a woman) at the Toronto Jewish Film Festival
