= Shalom Abu Bassem =

- Directed by: Nissim Mossek
- Written by: Nissim Mossek
- Produced by: Sharon Shcavett and Biblic Productions
- Music by: Jonathan Bar Giora
- Release date: 2004
- Running time: 52 minutes
- Country: Israel
- Languages: Hebrew and Arabic with English subtitles

Shalom Abu Bassem is a documentary by Nissim Mossek about the Israeli–Palestinian conflict that follows a New York City Jewish settler and an Arab hummus vendor that are forced to live as neighbors in the heart of Jerusalem. The documentary spans a nearly 20-year period, beginning before the First Intifada, to demonstrate how the nation's politics affect their neighborly relations. The film won Best Editing at the Haifa International Film Festival.

== Summary ==
"They say a good neighbor is better than a distant brother," Abu Bassem says, "If Ariel Sharon was a good neighbor, I'd be happy to have him as a neighbor."

With a matter-of-fact air and straightforward filming, Shalom Abu Bassem evaluates the Israeli-Palestinian conflict on an intimate, human scale, where a simple hello means a great deal. Abu and Danny both want peace for the sake of their children and make efforts to prove to the camera that they're reasonable, nonprejudicial men. But their noble intentions are tested over time, as waves of violence pass over the city, leaving blood stains on the cobble stone streets that lead to their homes.

Haladiya Street, where Abu and Danny both live, was a predominantly Jewish neighborhood until 1936, when riots broke out, killing countless innocent Jews and driving the rest of them out of their homes. Over time, Jews began to return, and before the First Intifada the neighborhood served as an example of relatively peaceful coexistence. But in the late 1980s, when violence broke out throughout Israel, the tension mounted in the neighborhood, and since then peace has been too short lived for the residents to fully relax and regain trust in one another.

Full of stubborn will, Abu and Danny both believe Haladiya Street is their rightful home. "It's a disgrace for an Arab to sell his house," Abu asserts, "It's like selling his faith ... like selling his child." Equally as passionate, Danny explains that it's been a lifelong dream to live in the holy city. It's because they're unwilling to budge that they're forced to live as neighbors.

But living in one of the most dangerous areas in the world has consequences. During the First Intifada, Danny left his home to buy bananas for his son. When he entered the market he felt uneasy, sensing something awful was going to happen. Before he had time to think, in broad daylight, a young Arab man pushed him to the ground and stabbed him in the back. With the help of emergency medical assistance, he survived. And although he still plays with the little Arab children on his street and says "shalom" to Abu, Abu sense a new, brooding distrust in Danny.

The documentary reveals how a fear of the unknown can lead to grand misconceptions. For years, the Arabs living on Haladiya Street are convinced that the yeshiva at the end of the block is a place of evil plotting. But when the filmmaker happens to gain entrance into the secret locked doors, he finds that instead of sinister planning the students are busing themselves playing on keyboards, dancing and praying.

While it's clear that peace in Israel won't come about easily, the documentary suggests that the steps towards a harmonious coexistence between the Jews and Arabs are simple. In fact, they're as simple as a few kind words. "We hate whoever hates us. We respect those who respect us," Abu explains. And respect is felt not only in grand political speeches and abstract negotiations, but also through simple courtesies and routine manners. "I need someone to say hello to me," Abu confides.

== Reception ==
Shalom Abu Bassem shares the story of two neighbors who serve as a microcosm of the Israeli experience. The film was praised for presenting the conflict in Israel on a human level—instead of addressing it with talking heads and politicians in a sterile room. It was seen as an emotional and provocative documentary that allows people on both sides of the debate to look with compassion on their opposition and see the conflict from the opposite perspective. It's said that the documentary's lack of resolve allows for realism. While the film received mostly praise, one critic complained that the filmmaker's subtle editing decisions created a bias that followed in Michael Moore's tradition of documentaries with an agenda.

== Awards and Festivals ==
Shalom Abu Bassem won Best Editing at the Haifa International Film Festival in 2004.

The documentary was featured in three film festivals:

- Warsaw Jewish Film Festival in 2006
- Munich International Documentary Film Festival in Germany in 2006
- Haifa International Film Festival 2004
