= No Longer 17 =

- לא בת 17
- Directed by: Itzhak Zepel Yeshurun
- Written by: Itzhak Zepel Yeshurun
- Produced by: Itzhak Zepel Yeshurun; Avi Kleinberger
- Starring: Dalia Shimko; Maya Maron; Avi Kleinberger
- Cinematography: Amnon Salomon
- Edited by: Tova Asher
- Music by: Jonathan Bar Giora
- Release dates: October 14, 2003 (Haifa Film Festival); October 30, 2003 (Israel)
- Running time: 97 minutes
- Country: Israel
- Language: Hebrew

No Longer 17 (Hebrew: לא בת 17) is a 2003 Israeli drama written and directed by Itzhak Zepel Yeshurun. It is the sequel to the director's 1982 film Noa at 17 and features actress Dalia Shimko reprising her role as Noa, the idealistic teen who is now a middle-aged woman, who experienced the United Kibbutz Movement split crisis and return to the kibbutz crisis of the 1990s.

The filming took place in Kibbutz Eyal and Kibbutz Horshim.

No Longer 17 premiered at the Haifa Film Festival in October 2003 where it won the Best Film award.

== Plot ==
A kibbutz in Israel is heavily in debt. In a desperate last effort to produce a viable financial restructuring, the old, "unproductive" members are asked to leave the community in order to make room for younger, more productive new members.

Noa (Dalia Shimko), 45, who left Israel many years ago and is now living in Amsterdam, is forced to return to the kibbutz to help her mother (Idit Tzur), who was among the first to be ousted. But when she comes back, it becomes only the first in a series of familial reunions that re-trigger old arguments and problems. Noa is also reunited with her daughter, Sarry (Maya Maron), who left for India with her own family secret.

Against the background of a disintegrating society, the film resurrects the protagonists of the film Noa at 17, at the time of a new and perhaps terminal crisis on the kibbutz.

== Cast ==
- Dalia Shimko as Noa
- Maya Maron as Sarry
- Avi Kleinberger as Kibbutz Spokesperson
- Yehuda Efroni
- Shmuel Shilo
- Idit Tzur as Bracha

== Critical reception ==
Robert Koehler of Variety described the film's pacing as "sluggish" and "unreasonably smothered in a storyline stuffed with intersecting crises faced by family members and lovers," depicting the once-iconic kibbutz as "a broken-down shell." Another film journalist, Sarit Fuchs, noted that the ideals of "solidarity and self-realization" once associated with the kibbutz are shown here as having been "distorted into lies, deceit, and wickedness. On the personal and social level . . . the subject of the film is treachery and betrayal of faith.”
