= Tallgrass Film Festival =

Film festival

The Tallgrass Film Festival is an annual film festival held in Wichita, Kansas, specializing in independent films. It was founded in 2003 by Timothy Gruver.

Gruver was raised in Wichita. He studied filmmaking at Brigham Young University. After college, Gruver worked for the animation wing of Steven Spielberg's DreamWorks studio. Gruver had worked for other film festivals and modeled Tallgrass after the Telluride Film Festival.

Tallgrass is operated by the non-profit organization Tallgrass Film Association.

There were 190 features and shorts screened in 2012.

The festival takes place at several locations in downtown Wichita including the Orpheum Theatre. In 2012, over 11,000 people attended. Since its creation in 2003, over 100,000 people have attended with approximately 200 filmmakers, actors and guests coming in for the festival from all over the world.

The 2003 festival screened 40 features and 55 short films at several venues in the downtown & Oldtown area. 4,172 people attended the festival, including 28 filmmakers. The first public event hosted by Tallgrass was a screening of Y Tu Mama Tambien in Dodge City, KS. Academy Award nominee Gary Busey attended in conjunction with the screening of The Buddy Holly Story, a documentary.

Cloris Leachman was a guest at the 2004 Festival. That year's festival included 24 feature films and 32 short films. Former baseball star Jose Canseco introduced the Opening Night Movie, the baseball documentary Up For Grabs.

The 2005 Festival was shortened to a one-day event due to the death of Gruver. 2,500 people attended.

4,850 people attended the 2007 Festival, including ten filmmakers.

Official Selections have included Audience Award winners The Big Bad Swim and 39 Pounds of Love; as well as the 2006 Independent Spirit Award winner Conventioneers, the 2007 Independent Spirit Award nominee Trials of Darryl Hunt as well as Bomb The System, Manhattan, Kansas, Dreamland, The Real Dirt on Farmer John, Fat Girls, Iraq in Fragments, The Last Picture Show, The Buddy Holly Story and the popular High School Shorts Program and Timothy Gruver Spotlight on Kansas Filmmakers.

2003 Opening Night Film: Bomb The System 2004 Opening Night Film: Up For Grabs 2005 (Shortgrass) Opening Night Film: Conventioneers 2006 Opening Night Film: Manhattan, Kansas 2007 Opening Night Film: Kansas v. Darwin 2008 Opening Night Film: What's the Matter with Kansas? 2009 Opening Night Film: The Only Good Indian 2010 Opening Night Film: The Dry Land 2011 Opening Night Film: Der Sandmann 2012 Opening Night Film: Pablo 2013 2014 2015 2016 2017 2018 Opening Night Film: Bathtubs Over Broadway.

As a result of the coronavirus pandemic, Tallgrass Film Festival held a virtual edition in 2020, instead of the usual event in Wichita. The opening night film was Eat Wheaties! starring Tony Hale and Paul Walter Hauser.
