= Noa at 17 =

- Film poster
- נועה בת 17
- Directed by: Itzhak Zepel Yeshurun
- Written by: Itzhak Zepel Yeshurun
- Produced by: Itzhak Zepel Yeshurun
- Starring: Dalia Shimko; Shmuel Shilo; Idit Tzur
- Cinematography: Itzhak Oren; Ya'ackov Saporta
- Edited by: Tova Asher
- Music by: Isaac Steiner
- Distributed by: Ergo Media (US)
- Release date: December 31, 1982
- Running time: 86 minutes
- Country: Israel
- Language: Hebrew

Noa at 17 (Hebrew: נועה בת 17) is a 1982 Israeli drama written and directed by Itzhak Zepel Yeshurun. It was shot over only two weeks. In 2003, actress Dalia Shimko reprised her role as Noa in the director's sequel, No Longer 17.

== Plot ==
Amid the political turmoil of the early 1950s in Israel, Noa (Dalia Shimko) is a fiercely independent 17-year-old member of a youth movement who finds herself in disagreement with her parents and her collective-minded, Zionist friends. She is caught between her desire to join a kibbutz and her parents' wish for her to graduate high school. At the same time, Noa's struggle is also part of a larger argument that divides the young nation. The bitter ideological battle taking place within the kibbutz movement following the Doctor's plot on whether to follow the model of the Soviet Union or that of the capitalist west threatens to fracture families, friendships and whole communities. Noa must fight for her individuality, her right to doubt and question all belief systems, but in the end finds herself isolated and disillusioned.

== Cast ==
- Dalia Shimko as Noa
- Adi Ne'eman
- Osnat Ofer
- Shmuel Shilo as Shraga
- Idit Tzur as Bracha
- Moshe Havazelet

== Critical reception ==
The film received high critical praise and relative success at the box office, selling some 190,000 tickets.
