= A.K.A Nadia =

- Film poster
- Directed by: Tova Ascher
- Written by: Tova Ascher, Anat Ascher
- Produced by: Esti Yaacov Mecklberg, Haim Mecklberg, Ruth Katz, Svetlana Bar
- Starring: Netta Shpigelman; Oded Leopold
- Cinematography: Talia "Tulik" Galon
- Edited by: Yair Ascher, Tova Ascher
- Music by: Ran Bagno
- Release date: July 2015
- Running time: 115 minutes
- Country: Israel
- Languages: Hebrew; Arabic; English
- Box office: 4,153 admissions in Israel

A.K.A Nadia (Hebrew: נדיה - שם זמני, Nadia - Shem Zmani) is a 2015 Israeli film, a debut directing work by Tova Ascher, a noted Israeli film editor, and starring Netta Shpigelman in the title role. It is a story of a Palestinian woman, Nadya, who has spent most of her adult life passing as a Jewish Israeli woman named Maya, her original identity unknown even to her husband and children.

The screenplay was written by the director in collaboration with her daughter, the philosophy professor Anat Ascher.

== Plot summary ==
Nadya falls in love with a PLO activist Nimmer and they marry secretly in London. Nimmer disappears, she is left without papers and support, and takes a job in a laundry. She manages to get a fake passport with the help of a laundry "customer #347", but the passport is for an Israeli Jew.

Fast forward 15 years, Nadya, now Maya, married to a government official, has become a successful choreographer. When her company is to perform a dance in collaboration with Arabs, she meets Nimmer, who is a member of the coordinating committee...

== Awards ==
The film was nominated for several awards and won two.

- 2015: Israel Critics’ Forum Award for best feature film at the Jerusalem Film Festival. Jury motivation: "...for a profound and articulate discussion of issues of identity and belonging to a place and a family. The director offers an intricate portrait of a reality that is grounded in separation walls, checkpoints and segregation. The film examines whether one can create oneself anew within a tragic political context, by presenting a fascinating, complex and touching human story."
- 2017: Micki Moore Award (to the Best Narrative Feature Film directed by a woman) at the Toronto Jewish Film Festival

== See also ==
- Twist of Fate
