= Beyond the Mountains and Hills =

2016 film

- Film poster
- Directed by: Eran Kolirin
- Written by: Eran Kolirin
- Cinematography: Shai Goldman
- Music by: Asher Goldschmidt
- Release date: 15 May 2016 (Cannes)
- Running time: 90 minutes
- Country: Israel
- Language: Hebrew

Beyond the Mountains and Hills (Hebrew: Me'Ever Laharim Velagvaot) is a 2016 Israeli drama film directed by Eran Kolirin. It was screened in the Un Certain Regard section at the 2016 Cannes Film Festival.

The film was one of five creative works nominated for the Best Film Award at the Ophir Awards.

== Plot ==
The film portrays the portrait of the Greenbaum family, an Israeli middle-class family living in a community near Jerusalem. The family members live together in the same house, yet each one operates in isolation, within their own world:

- David (Alon Pdut) – the father, a Lieutenant Colonel who has just retired from military service after 27 years and struggles to build a new life for himself.
- Rina (Shiri Nadav Naor) – the mother, a high school literature teacher who fantasizes about a more exciting life.
- Yifat (Mili Eshet) – the eldest daughter, a curious teenager and left-wing activist, who develops a relationship with a young Palestinian man.
- Omri (Noam Imber) – the younger son, a quiet and introverted high school student.

Throughout the film, each family member experiences an existential crisis and becomes entangled in a series of fears, secrets, and violence.
