= Time of Favor =

- Directed by: Joseph Cedar
- Written by: Joseph Cedar
- Produced by: David Mandil; Eyal Shiray
- Starring: Aki Avni; Tinkerbell; Idan Alterman; Assi Dayan; Abraham Celektar
- Cinematography: Ofer Inov
- Edited by: Tova Asher
- Music by: Jonathan Bar Giora
- Distributed by: Blue Dolphin Film Distribution Ltd.
- Release date: November 30, 2000 (Israel)
- Running time: 102 min.
- Country: Israel
- Language: Hebrew

Time of Favor (in Hebrew, Ha-hesder) is Israeli writer-director Joseph Cedar's 2000 debut film, starring Aki Avni. The film plays out a psychologically complex love triangle in the middle of terrorist conflict in the Israeli occupied West Bank.

The New York Times called it an "art house thriller," and the Los Angeles Times said it was "one of the most successful contemporary Israeli films."

== Plot ==
Manachem, a handsome young soldier in the Israeli Defense Force, is offered his own unit, made up of fellow students from Rabbi Meltzer's West Bank Yeshiva. Menachem's close friend Pini is one of the star scholars at the Yeshiva, and Rabbi Meltzer, in an attempt to play matchmaker, promises Pini his daughter Michal's hand in marriage. But Michal, strong-willed and independent, has no interest in marrying Pini, who is weak and in poor health. Instead, she falls for Menachem, and his loyalty to the Rabbi and to his friend Pini are tested as he struggles to choose between Michal and the unit.

Michal confesses to Menachem that she cannot stand living in her father's settlement. “This land of Israel is bought with pain,” says Michal, as she looks out on the sandy mountains of the West Bank. She believes that her father, the Rabbi, is too caught up in the Israeli cause and neglects those closest to him, like Michal's late mother who died of cancer after the Rabbi refused to leave the settlement to take her to the city for proper medical care. She resolves to run away, and asks Menachem to come with her. But Menachem feels guilty on account of Pini and the Rabbi, and leaves the settlement to return to his military base.

Menachem's unit had been mobilized by the Rabbi with the purpose of returning Jerusalem's Dome of the Rock to the control of Israel—a holy shrine in the old city that Muslims use as a mosque (Al-Aqsa) and Jews call Temple Mount. Menachem agrees with Rabbi Meltzer's plan in principle, regarding the group's activities as more symbolic than anything else. Other military authorities are wary of his plan, believing the Rabbi's soldiers could easily turn into a fanatical terrorist group with the wrong twist of the political winds.

Michal leaves her father's settlement and goes to live in Jerusalem. This does not deter Pini, who continues to make advances and she rejects him over and over. Devastated by Michal's rejections, Pini becomes newly determined to make good within Rabbi Meltzer's military unit, while mapping out a terrorist plot with the help of fellow student Itamar (Micha Selektar) in which they'll finally destroy the Dome of the Rock by bombing it from below. To convince Itamar to go along with the plan, he convinces him that Manacham approves of the plan, when in reality Menacham knows nothing about it.

Pini and Itamar leave to undertake the mission, and the rest of Menacham's unit is taken in by the Israeli government for questioning. After undergoing hours of interrogation, Menacham realizes that Pini has betrayed him. Guarded heavily by Israeli Defense Soldiers, Menacham, Michal and another soldier, Mookie, follow Pini and Itamar into a secret network of tunnels underneath Jerusalem, where Pini is waiting to blow up the Dome of the Rock using a suicide bomber's vest. The movie comes to a sharp climax as the characters race through the tunnels, trying to reach Pini and convince him to stop before it is too late. They find Itamar's body in the tunnels – he had fallen, or was killed by Pini along the way. Finally they reach Pini, who is lying in a cave preparing to detonate the bomb. Menacham and Michal plead with him, but he refuses to change his mind. As Pini reaches for the button to detonate the bomb, Menacham leaps on top of him to try to prevent him from setting it off. But in the same instant, Mookie shoots and kills Pini. The movie ends with Menacham, Michal and the rest of the Israeli Defense Team exiting the tunnels together.

Cedar's Zionist upbringing is apparent in this highly religious film. Time of Favor handles the Holy Land with high regard and maintains a sense of solemnity throughout. The importance of prayer and tradition is stressed. Soldiers dressed in full uniform break from their training to open prayer books and raise their minds to God. The Rabbi's religious position marks him as a strong authority in his community. He is trusted and respected, and his students, with total faith in him, follow his every wish.

== Original Score ==
The music for this film was composed and performed by Jonathan Bar Giora. It was his debut film score, and a first in a series of over 140 film scores composed by him in the 21st century. Vocalist Eli Luzon sings a few musical cues in the soundtrack, and performs the movie theme song "Time of Favor". Singer Rinat Gabay performs a few additional musical cues. The original score was praised by the international press: “A haunting score” - Loren King, Boston Globe Jan 18, 2001, “Judiciously used music has a traditional, wistful flavor” - Sheri Linden, Variety Feb 6, 2001. It was nominated for the Best original score award of the Israeli Film Academy Ofir Award 2000.

== Cast ==
- Aki Avni as Menachem
- Tinkerbell as Michal
- Idan Alterman as Pini
- Assi Dayan as Rabbi Meltzer
- Abraham Celektar as Itamar (as Micha Selektar)
- Amnon Volf as Mookie
- Shimon Mimran as Benny
- Uri Klauzner as Sivan (as Uri Klausner)
- Samuel Calderon as Doron (as Shemuel Kalderon)

== Reception ==
Time of Favor met with mixed reviews. The film's complex depiction of Israel was generally praised. Cedar, an Israeli, offers an insider's unique, nuanced look at his homeland. While he's mildly critical of the settlements in the West Bank, he remains respectful towards the religious who live there. The Los Angeles Times gave the film a glowing review, calling it "intensely contemporary," and the San Francisco Chronicle described the film's "balanced, reflective and reasonable," tone.

The Village Voice said Time of Favor was a "flawed but engrossing thriller." There's a sort of tunnel vision that neglects the Palestinians, but the fact that an Israeli is a terrorist makes the film "exotic."

== Awards ==
Time of Favor won six awards from the Israeli Film Academy Awards in 2000:

- Best Film
- Best Lead Actor--Aki Avni
- Best Lead Actress—Tinkerbell
- Best Cinematography--Ofer Inov
- Best Editing-- Tova Asher
- Best Screenplay--Joseph Cedar

Time of Favor was nominated Israeli Film Academy Awards in some other categories in 2000:

- Best Art Direction-- Yair Greenberg
- Best Costume Design-- Etti Luggassi
- Best Music-- Jonathan Bar Giora
- Best Sound-- Israel David and John Purcell
- Best Supporting Actor-- Idan Alterman

Time of Favor was nominated for a Peace Award from the American Political Film Society in 2003, and won the Audience Award from the Washington Jewish Film Festival in 2001.
