= 39 Pounds of Love =

2005 film by Dani Menkin

- Film poster
- Directed by: Dani Menkin
- Written by: Dani Menkin; Ilan Heitner
- Starring: Ami Ankilewitz
- Cinematography: Yoav Kleinman
- Music by: Chris Gubisch
- Distributed by: Balcony Releasing
- Release date: April 7, 2005 (DocAviv)
- Running time: 70 minutes
- Country: United States
- Language: English

39 Pounds of Love is a film written and directed by Dani Menkin, with co-writer, Ilan Heitner. It stars Ami Ankilewitz, a 34-year-old Israeli 3D animator who lived with Spinal Muscular Atrophy (SMA). The documentary centers on his journey across the United States by motorhome to find the doctor who told his mother when he was born that he would not live past the age of 6. The title refers to the fact that Ankilewitz weighed only 39 pounds during his cross-country trip due to the rare form of SMA/2 that he was born with. Even though he could not move any part of his body except for one finger, he was still determined to use that finger to create 3D animations and live his life as he would if he had not suffered from SMA. 39 Pounds of Love was officially released on April 5, 2005 and was re-released on DVD on October 6, 2009.

== Reception ==
39 Pounds of Love won Best Documentary at both the Tahoe/Reno and Palm Beach Film Festivals, and won the Audience Award at both the Tallgrass and Boston Jewish Film Festival. The film was also placed on the Oscar short list for the Best Documentary Feature category in 2005.
