= Nissim Mossek =

- ניסים מוסק
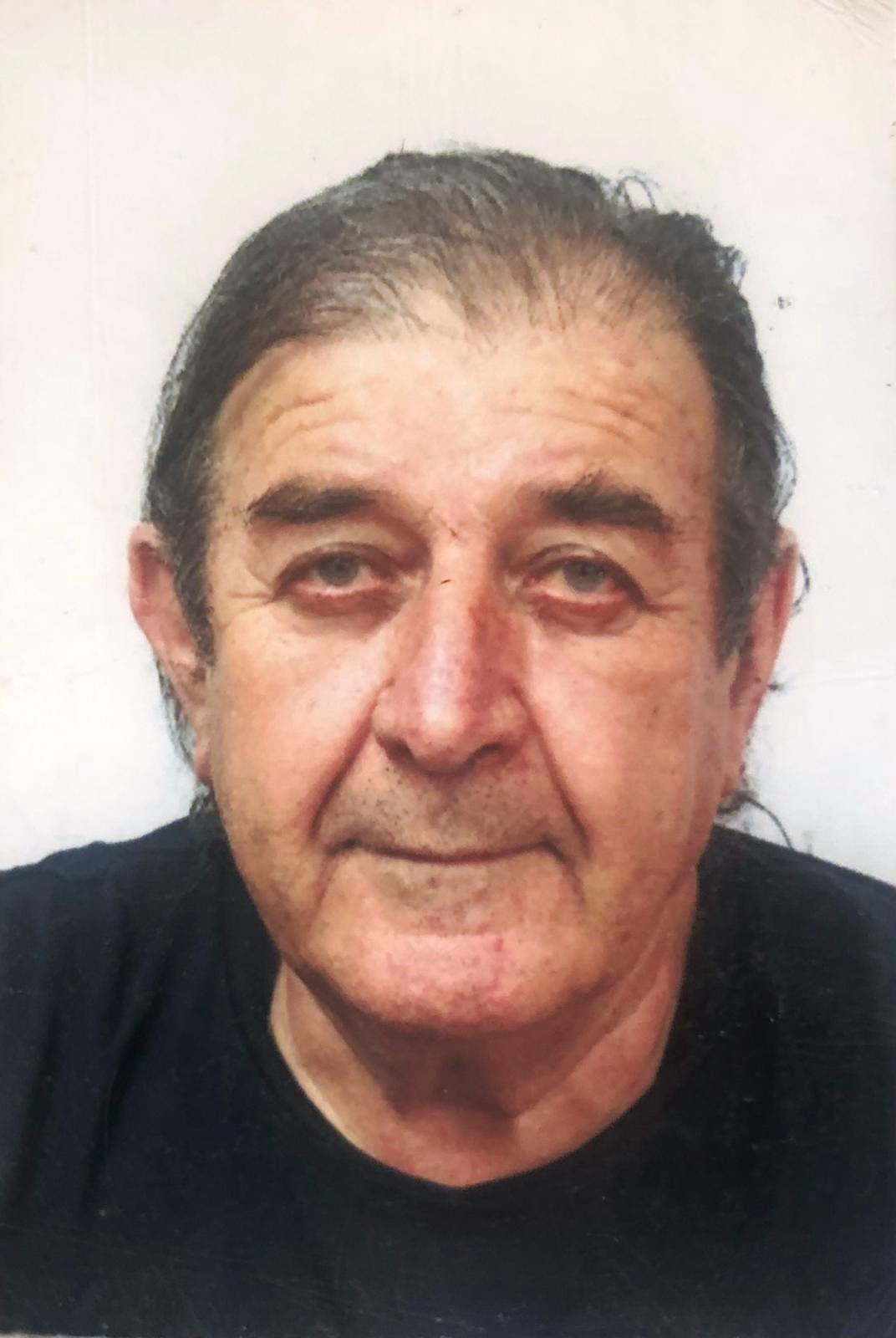
- Born: Nissim Moscona; 28 April 1948 (age 78); Yambol, Bulgaria
- Occupations: Documentary film director, writer and producer
- Years active: 1973–present
- Notable work: Black Panthers
- Children: 3

Nissim Mossek (Hebrew: ניסים מוסק; born 28 April 1948) is an Israeli documentary film director, writer and producer for film and television. Since 1986, Mossek has been the director and editor for Biblical Productions. Regarded as a director with a social conscience, in 2004 Mossek won the Landau Award as the Best Director for documentary films. As a director and editor, Mossek explores subjects such as racism, homosexuality and other cultural boundaries in Israeli society.

== Filmography ==
=== Director ===
- Wild West Hebron (2013)
- The Electric Stage: A Rock 'n Roll Legend (2008)
- Prison LTD.: Prison Privatization (2007)
- Citizen Nawi (2007)
- Golda's Revenge (2006)
- Operation Sphinx (2006)
- The Holy Land Revealed (2005)
- Shalom Abu Bassem (2004)
- Who is Mordechai Vanunu (2004)
- Adolph Eichmann: The Secret Memoirs (2002)
- Have You Heard About the Panthers? (2002)
- The Man of Nazareth (2001)
- Aiming High: The History of the Israeli Airforce (1998) (TV)
- Tkuma (English "Rebirth") (1998) (TV Miniseries)
- Ani Ha'Merigel Shelcha (English: I'm Your Spy) (1997)
- Neighbors or Foes (1996)
- Mysteries of Jerusalem (1995)
- Pillar of Fire (1981), episodes 1 and 12 of the Hebrew version

=== Editor ===
- Wild West Hebron (2013)
- Citizen Nawi (2007)
- Salvador: The Ship of Shattered Hopes (2006)
- Who is Mordechai Vanunu (2004)
- Adolph Eichmann: The Secret Memoirs (2002)
- Ordinary People (2002) (TV Series)
- Have You Heard About the Panthers? (2002)
- Aiming High: The History of the Israeli Airforce (1998) (TV)
- HaInstalator (English: "The Plumber") (1986)
- Operation Moses (1985)
- Kasach (1984)

=== Producer ===
- Waves of Freedom (2008)
- The Block (1999)
- Mysteries of Jerusalem (1995)
