= Miri Segal =

Israeli new media artist (born 1965)

Miri Segal מירי סגל
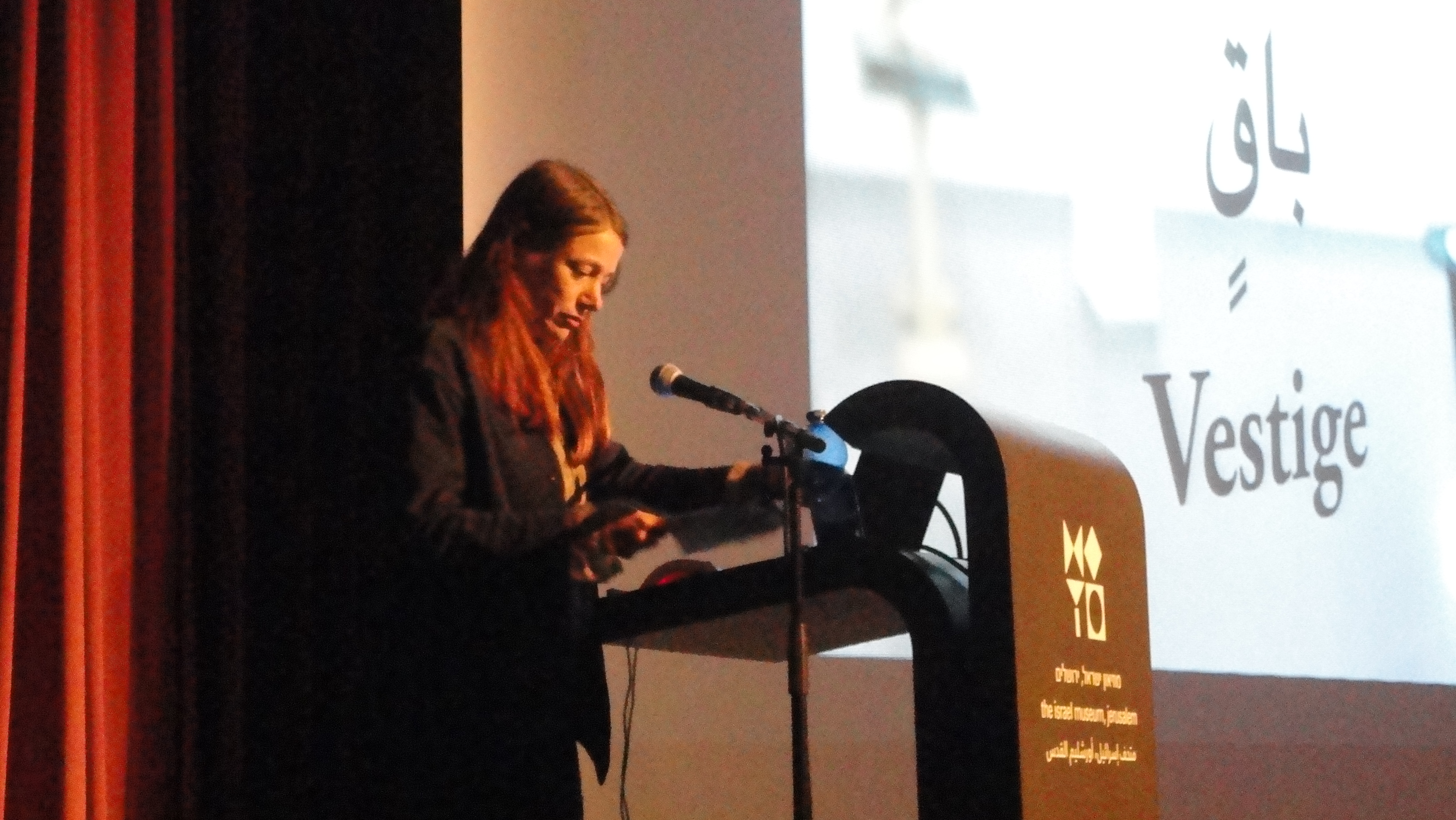
- Born: 1965 (age 60–61); Haifa, Israel
- Known for: New media art
- Movement: Contemporary art
- Awards: Dizengoff Prize, Nathan Gottesdiener Foundation Israeli Art Prize, Mendel and Eva Pundik Foundation Prize for Israeli Art

Miri Segal (Hebrew: מירי סגל) is a new media artist currently living in Tel Aviv. Segal was born 1965, in Haifa, Israel. Since the late 90s she has created video and media installations, light objects and theatrical pieces. Prior to her career as an artist she studied Mathematics. In 1997, She received a PhD in mathematics from the Hebrew University in Jerusalem under the instruction of Prof. Menachem Magidor. In 1998, she studied Art at the San Francisco Art Institute. Segal owes her taste for the mechanisms of perception and the construction of sense-stimulating illusions to her mathematical background, according to art historian Hanna Almeka.

Segal is a senior lecturer at the Fine Arts department, Bezalel Academy of Art and Design and at Hamidrasha Art Faculty, Beit Berl College. Between 2013 and 2019 she headed the Postgraduate Program for Fine Art at Hamidrasha.

== Work and career ==
Segal's first solo show was in 1999 in Dvir Gallery, Tel Aviv. Her first institutional solo show was at MoMA PS1, in 2001. Segal had solo exhibitions at the Tel Aviv Museum of Art (2002), Lisson Gallery, London (2004), Kamel Mennour Gallery (2006, 2009), Dvir Gallery, Tel Aviv (1999, 2005, 2007, 2010), and a mid-career exhibition at the Herzliya Museum of Contemporary Art (2018), among others. Segal also created several experimental works for Theatre. Her piece ‘Polished Eye’ (created together with Maya Magnat and Sharon Gabay) was shown at the Israel Festival (2021).

She participated in group exhibitions and screenings at Tate Modern (London), Palais de Tokyo (Paris), Centre Pompidou (Paris), Magasin III Stockholm, Kunstmuseum Luzern, Tokyo Wonder Site, and many more. In 2001 she won the prestigious Nathan Gottesdiener Foundation Israeli Art Prize, awarded by the Tel Aviv Museum of Art, including a solo show there. In 2002 she won the Ministry of Science Culture & Sport, Israeli Art Prize for Excellence in Art. In 2007 she won the Dizengoff Prize, awarded by the Tel Aviv-Yafo Municipality, and in 2009 the Mendel and Eva Pundik Foundation Prize for Israeli Art.

Segal's artistic language employs a variety of media – including video, light sculptures, text, and treated objects involving hardware and software. Her works often invade the viewer's space in unexpected ways, via sensory manipulations and crafted technology, thus encouraging viewers to question what they see before them. In her practice, Segal deals with philosophical questions regarding existence, the ethics of technology, and economic-political regimes.

Segal is represented by Dvir Gallery: Tel Aviv, Brussels & Paris.

== Awards and Grants ==
- 2017 Artis Grant
- 2015 Mifal HaPais Lottery Art and Culture Council Grant
- 2009 CCA Tel Aviv Video & Experimental Cinema Fund
- 2007 Mendel and Eva Pundik Foundation Prize for Israeli Art
- 2005 Meir Dizengoff Prize for Painting and Sculpture
- 2005 Residency grant – Centre International d'accueil et d'échanges des Récollets, Paris
- 2003 Residency grant – Villa Arson, Nice, France
- 2002 Ministry of Science Culture & Sport, Israeli Art Prize for Excellence in Art
- 2001 Nathan Gottesdiener Foundation Israeli Art Prize, Tel Aviv Museum of Art

== Collections ==
- The Israel Museum, Jerusalem
- Tel Aviv Museum of Art
- Herzliya Museum of Contemporary Art
- ORS collection, Tel Aviv
- Philippe Cohen collection, Paris/Tel Aviv
- FNAC, Fonds national d'art contemporain by CNAP, centre national des arts plastiques, France
- FRAC des Pays de la Loire
- Maison Rouge, Fondation Antoine de Galbert, Paris
- Magasin III, Stockholm
- Kunstmuseum, Luzern
- Zabludowicz Collection, London
- Kadist Art Foundation, Paris and San Francisco
