= Hen Yanni =

Israeli actress

- חן יאני
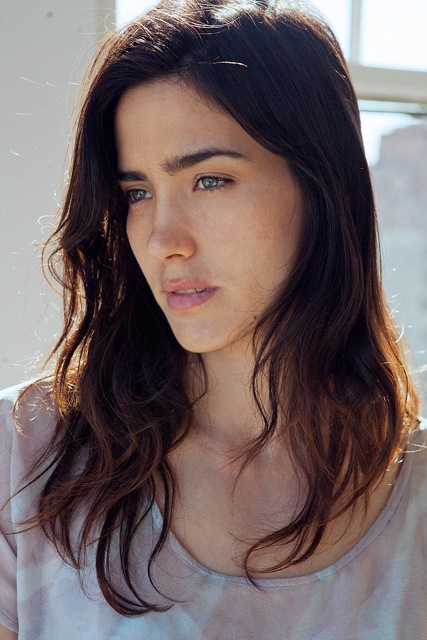
- Yanni in 2012
- Born: 20 January 1983 (age 43); Haifa, Israel
- Citizenship: Portugal
- Occupations: Singer; DJ; actress; model
- Years active: 1999–present

Hen Yanni (Hebrew: חן יאני; born 20 January 1983) is an Israeli-Portuguese musician.

== Personal life and career ==
She was born to a Moroccan mother and a Turkish father. She traveled the world from an early age, working as an actress and model before following her call towards songwriting and music. She currently lives in Barbizon village in France, a creative enclave at the edge of the Fontainebleau forest outside of Paris.

Her first single Where Do We Go was released on 20 January 2023 and received warm reviews around the world while attracting people to her release party & Live Show at La Folie Barbizon. The video for Where Do We Go was a collaboration with director and photographer Aleph Molinari, the choreographer Sharon Eyal, and stylist Camille Bidault-Waddington. A retro-modern reverie, the video captures Hen at her most vulnerable, her image replicated into an infinite mirror where she confronts herself. Her debut EP “Where do we go?”, released in June 2023, is a musical diary – a deeply-personal collection of memories – that seeks to establish a dialogue with the past while speaking to her future self. The EP is an enchanting experience full of raw emotion and poetic portraits. The project is released on the label Animal63, anticipating a forthcoming debut album "Version of You" in September 2024.

During the years 1999-2003 she worked as a model in Paris, New York City and London. She photographed to the magazines Italian Vogue, French Vogue, V Magazine, The Face and ID. Her major campaigns includes companies like Paul & Joe, Dolce & Gabbana and Kenneth Cole. She was photographed by photographers like Craig McDean, David Sims and Mario Testino.

At the age of 21 she started acting. In 2008, Yanni played the major role in the feature film The Other War, directed by Tamar Glazerman. In 2010, she played a supporting role in the feature film Melach Yam, directed by Itay Lev, where she made a cover version to Shlomo Artzi's song "You will Never know". In 2012, she played a supporting role in Haim Buzaglo's feature film Blank Blank.

In 2011, she starred Doron Eran's film Melting Away, in which she played the lead role of a transgender person. In Melting Away, she sings two songs, one of them is "Danny Boy". Yanni won a breakthrough performance award at the LGBT Tel Aviv international Film Festival, was nominated for Israeli Academy award for best actress.
