= Dani Menkin =

- דני מנקין
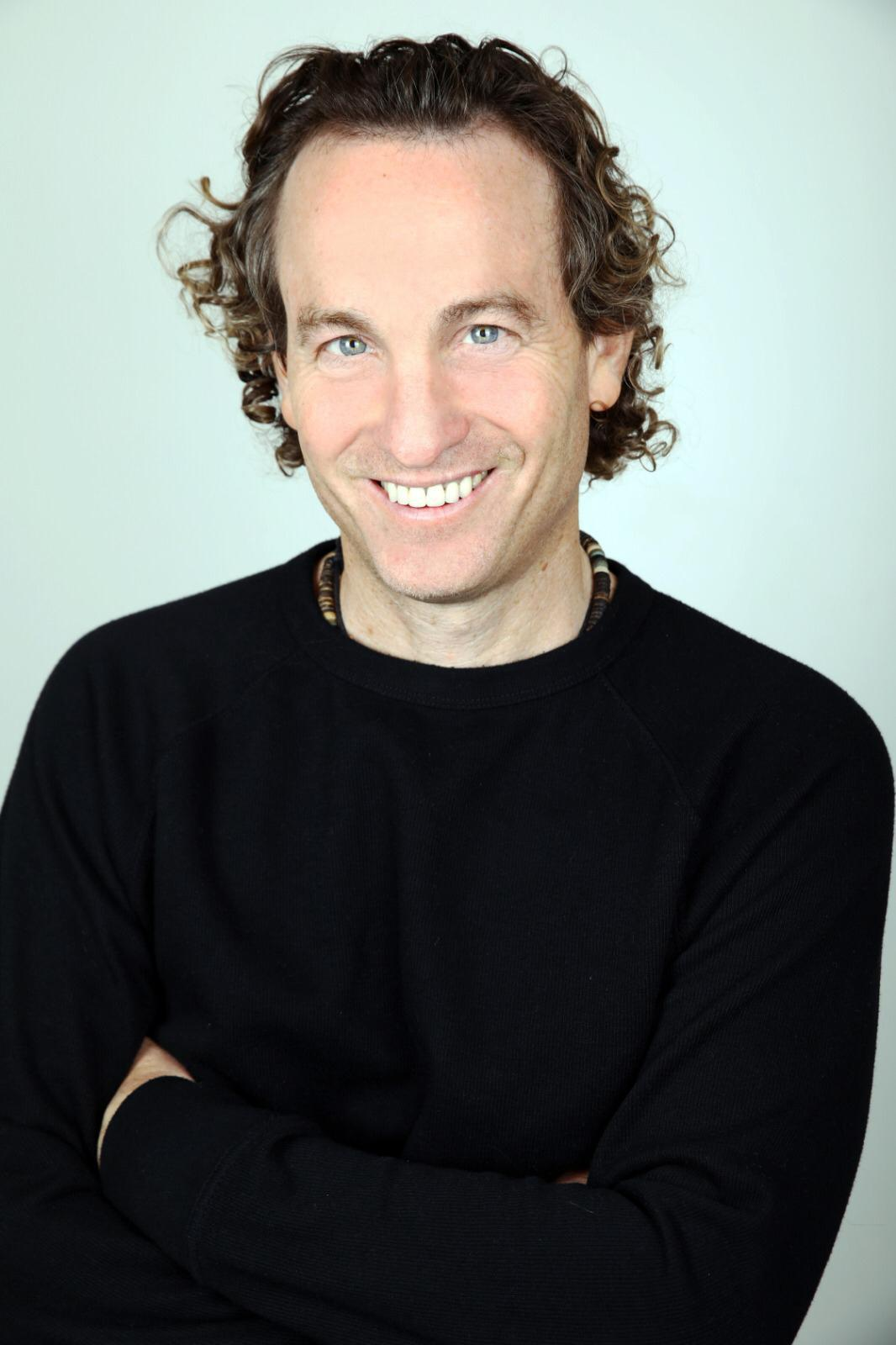
- Dani Menkin, 2011
- Born: Tel Aviv, Israel
- Occupations: Film director, screenwriter, producer
- Years active: 1994-present

Dani Menkin (Hebrew: דני מנקין) is a Los Angeles-based writer, director, and film producer. He is a two-time Israeli Academy Award winner and the founder of the film production company Hey Jude Productions.

== Biography ==
Menkin's professional career began in 1994, when he joined the Israeli Sports Channel (Sport5) as a reporter. In 1995, he moved to Israeli Channel 2, where he covered the Sports Section in the popular program "HaDaka ha-91" with Yoram Arbel. Between the years 1998 to 2004, he directed articles for the investigative program Uvda with Ilana Dayan. In 2001, Menkin worked in a series for National Geographic Society. During those years, Menkin was Director Supervisor for the Israeli cult film "Hochmat HaBeygale" ("The Wisdom of the Pretzel") along with the director Ilan Heitner.

In 2005, Menkin created his own independent film production company "Hey Jude Productions".

Menkin is a speaker at some distinguished panels over International Festivals around the world, as well as a juror and film professor in American and Israeli universities and colleges. Menkin taught at Syracuse University as well as at Wesleyan University. Menkin has collaborated with other filmmakers and creatives—most recently interviewing the creators of sports documentary miniseries The Last Dance, and featured on a podcast alongside basketball all-star Chris Webber.

Menkin is married and has two children.

== Directing career ==
=== Is That You? (2014) ===
The story of Ronnie, 60-year-old Israeli film projectionist, who has been fired from his job and is going now to the U.S. in search of Rachel, the love of his youth. Is That You? is a romantic roadtrip journey. This film found success at several International Film Festivals, such as Hollywood, Montreal, Haifa and Syracuse Film Festivals, the 28th Israel Film Festival in LA, and the Jewish Film Festivals across the US. It has also won the "Best Indie Film of the Year" award (2014), and has been nominated for the "Best Film of the Year" award (2014) by the Israeli Academy.

=== Je T'aime I Love You Terminal (2011) ===
A romantic drama which follows Ben, a 29-year-old Israeli on his way to New York to re-join his fiancée and start his new life. During the flight he meets a flirtatious, outrageous, and somewhat dysfunctional Emma. Over the course of 24-hour connection in Prague, the two contemplate life, love, and relationships. Starring Israeli musician Danny Niv (Mooki)as Ben, and Naruna De-Macedo Kaplan as Emma. Menkin wrote, produced and directed the award winning film. The film has participated and won International Festivals, including "Best Feature film" award at Houston International film festival.

=== 39 Pounds of Love (2005) ===
A documentary film which follows Ami Ankilewitz, who was diagnosed at childhood with an extremely rare form of SMA/2 that severely limits his physical growth and movement. Ami was given 6 years to live and outlived the doctor's predictions to the age of 34. The film won multiple awards including the Ophir award in 2005. Menkin was awarded the Israeli Academy Award for this movie. The film, written, produced and directed by him, has been sold to HBO, and was shortlisted for the Oscars.

=== Dolphin Boy (2011) ===
Directed along with Jonathan Nir, this documentary film tells the story of Morad, a teenage boy from an Arab village in the north of Israel, who suffered a violent attack, which led to trauma. Morad stopped having contact with the outside world, and just before hospitalization in a mental institute, he was taken by his father to be treated with Dolphins in Eilat. The film follows Morad's therapy over the course of four years. This won several nominations and awards, the "Jury Mention Award" at the Jerusalem International Film Festival, the French-German Arte and British Channel 4. Dolphin Boy was sold to over 20 countries around the globe, and was bought by Disney for a fiction adaptation.

=== On the Map (2016) ===
A movie about the Maccabi Tel Aviv basketball team prevailing over CSKA Moscow in the 1977 Champions Cup. Moments after this highly charged and historical win, Israeli-American basketball hero Tal Brody captured the heart of the nation when he famously said, "Israel is on the map, not just in sport, but in everything." The story of this triumph against all odds is told through the eyes of six American basketball players who joined Maccabi Tel Aviv. This was sold to Lionsgate.

=== Picture of His Life (2019) ===
Directed alongside Jonatan Nir, this documentary film follows the journey of underwater photographer Amos Nachoum as he sets off on a journey to photograph the world's largest carnivore: the polar bear. Nachoum tried before and barely escaped, but now, as he nears the end of his career, he is determined to give it one last shot. As the journey unfolds, Nachoum contemplates the series of unspoken events that drove him here, to the end of the world. It has been a long and painful journey, after serving in an Elite Commando unit and witnessing the horrors of war, but where others find fear, Nachoum finds redemption.

=== Aulcie (2020) ===
"Aulcie" tells the inspiring story of Aulcie Perry, a basketball legend who led Maccabi Tel Aviv to an upset win in the European Championship. During the summer of 1976, Aulcie Perry was spotted by a scout for Maccabi Tel Aviv while playing at the Rucker courts in Harlem and was quickly signed to play for their fledgling team. The Israeli players immediately responded to Aulcie's leadership and that year they had what one Sports Illustrated writer described as "the most extraordinary season in its remarkable history" and what Perry later called "the best nine months of my life." In 1977, Perry helped the team to its first European Championship, a prize they took four years later again under his leadership. After the season, to the surprise of many, Aulcie Perry converted to Judaism, adopted the Hebrew name Elisha Ben Avraham, and became an Israeli citizen. This inspiring film tells the story of this remarkable athlete who captured the spirit of a nation, triumphant and victorious against all odds, and put Israel on the map.

=== Little Town (2023) ===
The story follows Jason, a failed stand-up comedian who takes his little son to an imaginary town over the mountains, to look for his mother, who has died. They make their journey with an unknown lady, who claims she knows the town, and implores them to follow their dreams and heart.
