= Melting Away =

- נמס בגשם
- Directed by: Doron Eran
- Written by: Billy Ben-Moshe
- Produced by: Doron Eran; Moshe Edery; Leon Edery; Billy Ben-Moshe; Micky Dotan
- Starring: Hen Yanni; Ami Weinberg; Limor Goldstein
- Cinematography: Daniel Kedem
- Edited by: Reut Han
- Music by: Michael Harpaz
- Release date: January 12, 2012
- Running time: 86 minutes
- Country: Israel
- Language: Hebrew

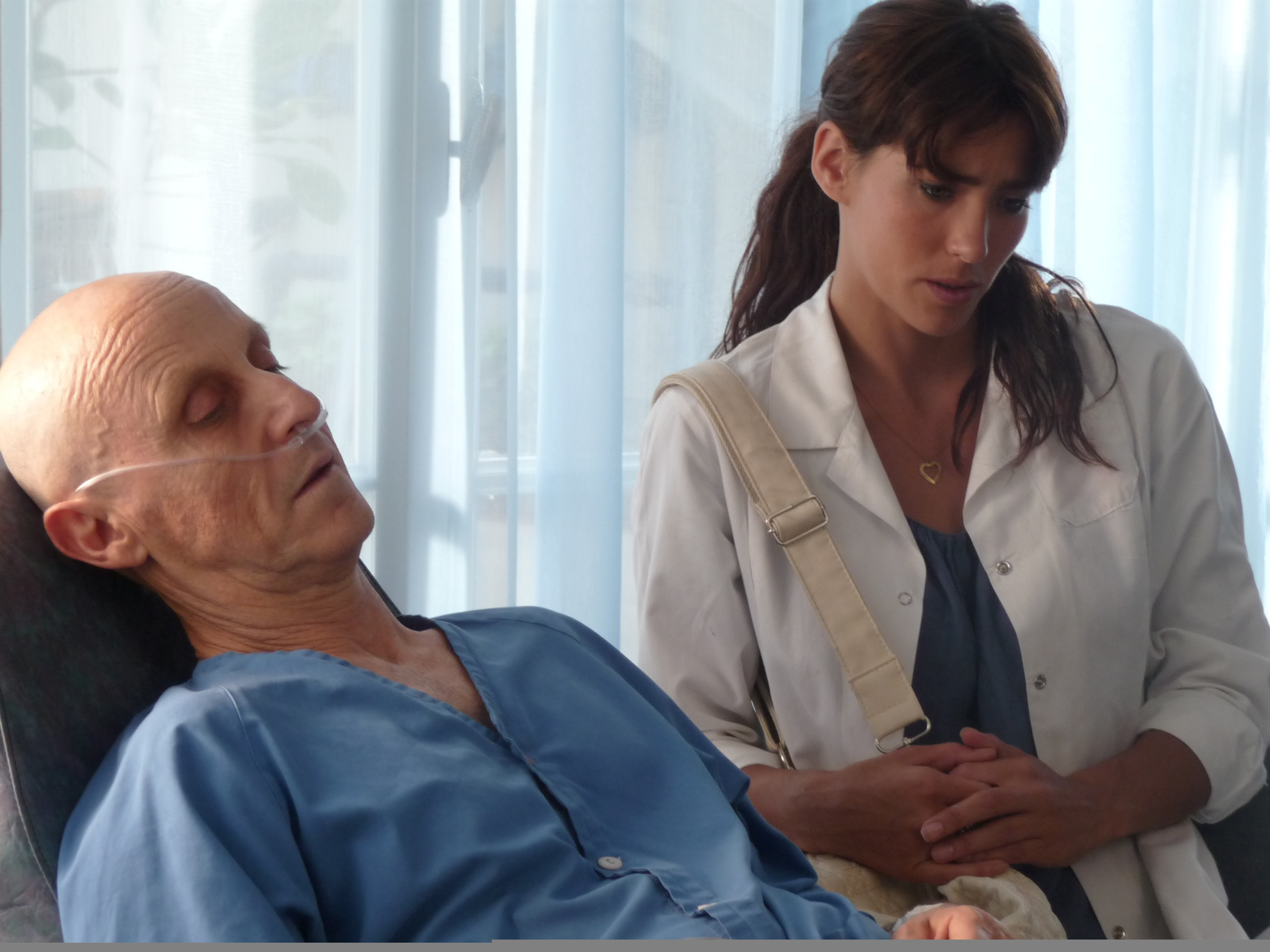
Anna (Hen Yanni) and Shlomo (Ami Weinberg)

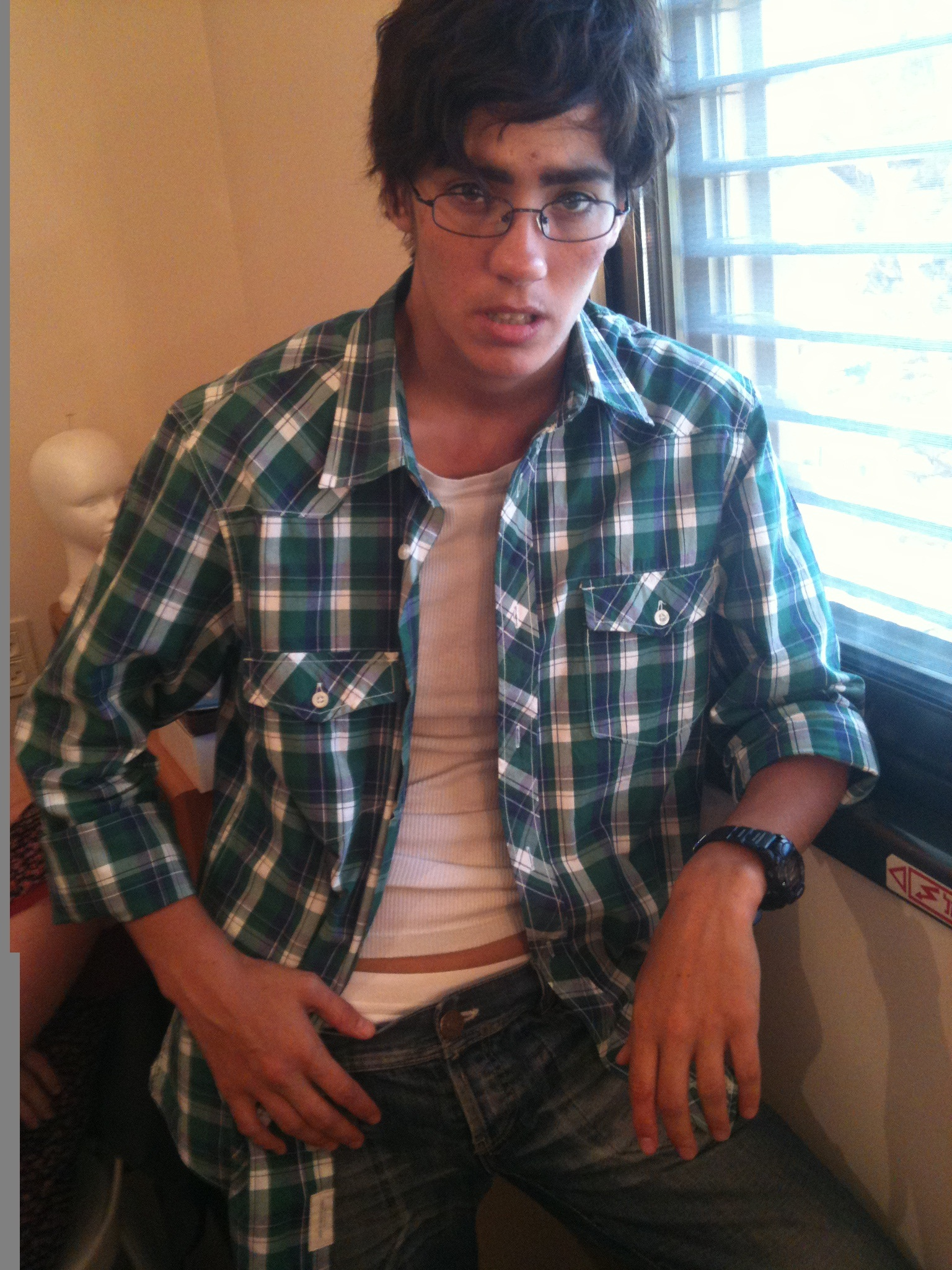
Hen Yanni as Asaf

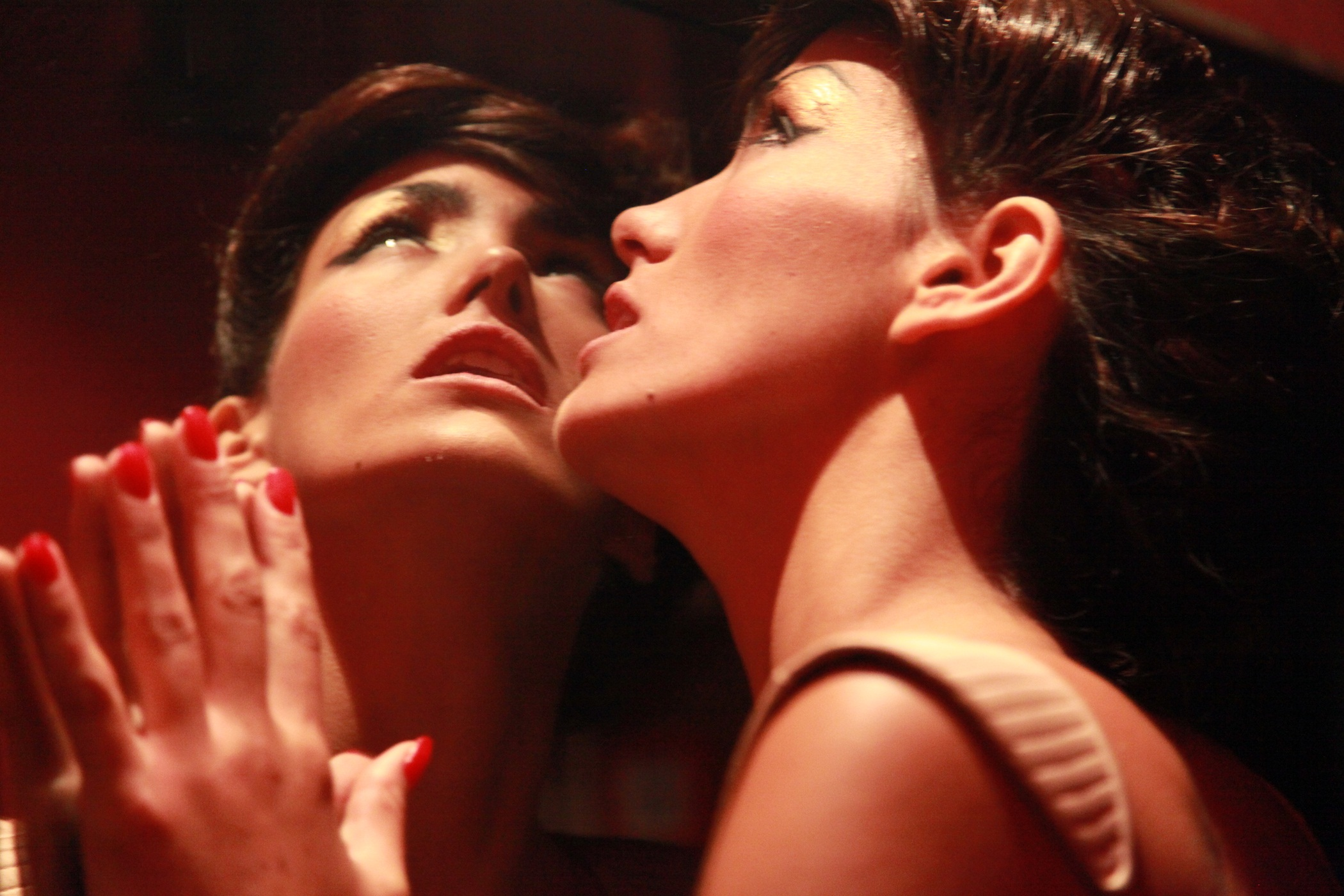
Hen Yanni as Anna

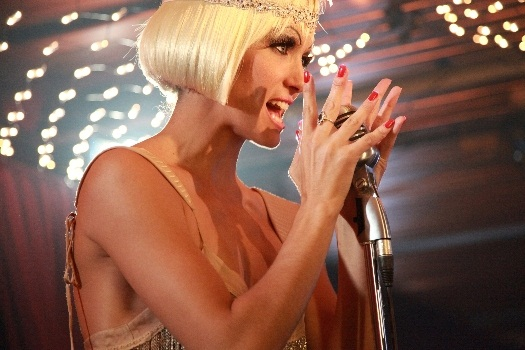
Hen Yanni as Anna

Melting Away (Hebrew: נמס בגשם, Names Ba-Geshem) is a 2012 Israeli drama film written by Billy Ben-Moshe and directed by Doron Eran, starring Hen Yanni in the lead role. This is the first Israeli feature film deals with parents coping with their transgender child.

== Production ==
The idea for the movie was conceived after the 2009 Tel Aviv gay centre shooting. Doron Eran and Billy Ben-Moshe watched TV and heard that parents refused to visit their injured kids at the hospital because they were afraid that their friends and relatives would know that their son is homosexual or their daughter is lesbian. The director Doron Eran made auditions for 120 actors until he found Hen Yanni, the actress he chooses for the lead role.

== Plot ==
Shlomo Shapira discovers one day that his teenage son Asaf likes to wear women's clothes. With the silent consent of his wife Galia, he decides to teach his son a lesson. On a rainy night Asaf returns to his parents' home after a party but they refuse to open the door, even though he cries. Shlomo tell Galia that after Asaf discovers the hard world outside he will come back home and will forget all of this nonsense, but he was wrong. Four years later, Shlomo is dying from cancer and Galia turns to Eytan, a private investigator to find her son and tell him about his father. Eytan finds Asaf in a Tel-Aviv gay night club. It turns out that Asaf transitioned and has become a beautiful singer named Anna. On the next day a woman named Anna came to the hospital where Shlomo is hospitalized, saying she is a private nurse sent from the insurance company. Anna visits her father day after day and they gradually get to know each other. She succeeds in conquering Shlomo's heart with her charming personality. At the same time, Galia visits her daughter Anna a few times and gradually accepts her.

== Prizes ==
- Special award for breakthrough performance to Hen Yanni for her role in "Melting Away"- Tel Aviv International LGBT Film Festival
- Audience Award at the Boston Jewish Film Festival, 2012
- Audience Award for Best Narrative Feature at the ImageOut: Rochester LGBT Film and Video Festival, October 2012
- Audience Award at the Shalom Europa IFF, France 2012
- Festival Award at the Au fil(m) du temps- IMAJ Israeli Film Festival, Belgium 2011
- Hen Yanni was nominated to Ophir Award for best actress

== Cast ==
- Hen Yanni – Asaf Shapira / Anna
- Ami Weinberg – Shlomo Shapira
- Limor Goldstein – Galia Shapira
- Oded Leopold –Itzik, Anna's uncle and Shlomo's young brother
- Eyal Rozales –Eytan, the private investigator
- Yonatan Barak – Gingi, the private investigator assistant
- Shay Kadimi – Shimi, Anna's childhood friend, having difficulties Coming out of the closet in front of his mother.; Moty's boyfriend
- Hannan Suissa – Moty, Anna's childhood friend, Shimi's boyfriend
- Shosha Goren – Sarah, Shimi's mother, she function as a mother to the three boys
- Arnon Zadok – Shlomo Shapira business partner

== See also ==
- Culture of Israel
- Cinema of Israel
