= Sharon Tal =

Israeli actress

- שָׁרוֹן טַל
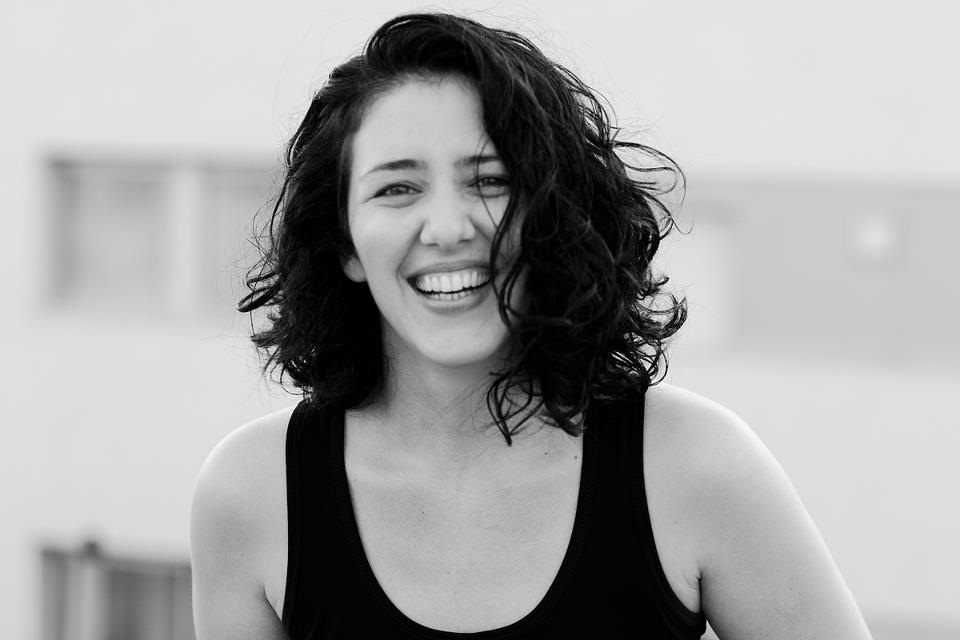
- Sharon Tal
- Occupation: Actress

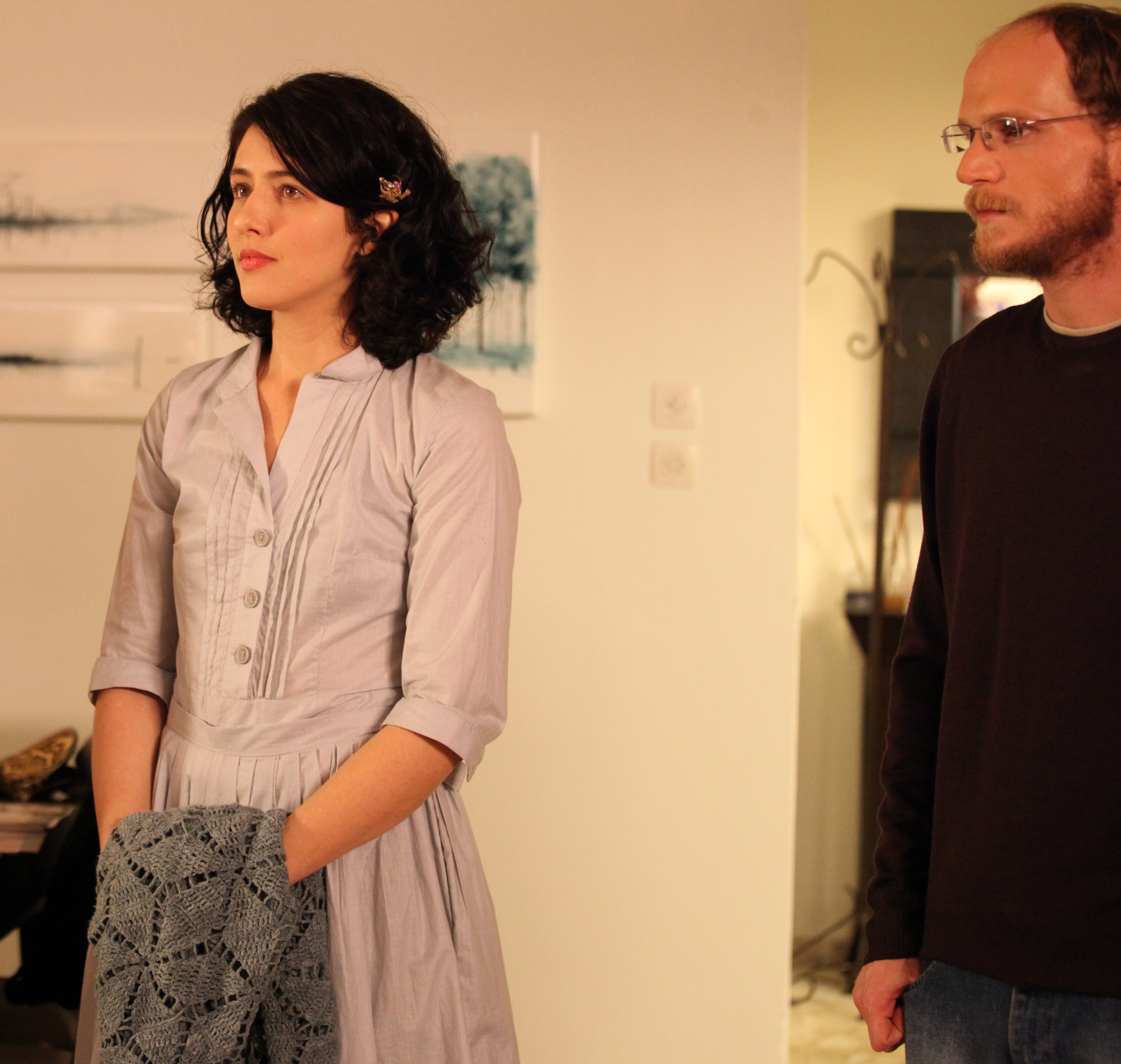
Sharon Tal and Rotem Keinan in Eran Kolirin's movie The Exchange (2011)

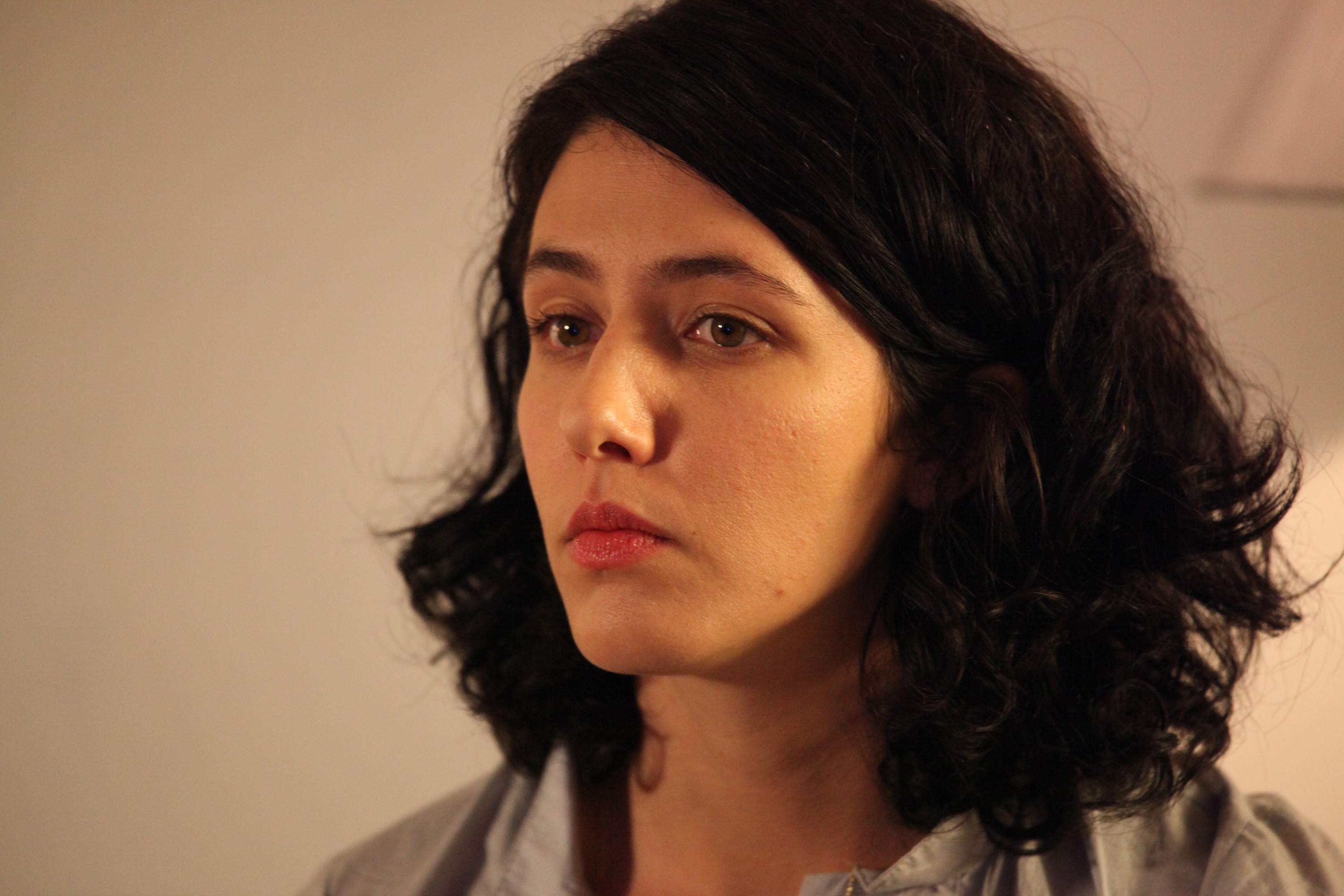
Sharon Tal, The Exchange

Sharon Tal (Hebrew: שָׁרוֹן טַל) is an Israeli actress.

== Biography ==
Raised in Jerusalem, she finished high school in theater and literature class, appearing in three plays at the Mikro Theatre in Jerusalem. Tal played Shifra in Enemies, A Love Story, based on Isaac Bashevis Singer novel by that name. Following this, she played Dona Anna and Pierro in the play Farewell Don Juan.

Tal is a graduate of the 2009 class at the "Nissan Nativ School of Acting". She won an America Israel Cultural Foundation Scholarship for 2007/8, and was among 30 actors chosen from 400 candidates worldwide to participate in a three-year course for the training of theatre pedagogists in Venice, under the guidance of the renowned theater director Anatoly Vasiliev.

She was the lead actress in Eran Kolirin's movie The Exchange (2011). Tal played the role of Tami, an architect married to Oded (Rotem Keinan). The couple have a perfectly normal life, until one day the husband has an internal change, and the couple gradually become estranged from each other.

For this role, she was nominated for the best actress prizes at the Venice Film Festival 2011 and Ophir Award 2012.
