= Israel Festival =

Festival

The Israel Festival (Hebrew: פסטיבל ישראל) is a multidisciplinary arts festival held every spring in Israel. Its center is Jerusalem. The festival operates as a non-profit organization. Some of the shows are offered free. Street performances and special performances for children are also part of the festival.

== History ==
The Israel Festival started in 1961 as a summer festival for classical music in the ancient Roman theater in Caesarea. Throughout the years the festival grew in the number of art disciplines and activity centers with recent festivals including classical music, ballet, jazz, theater, visual arts and lectures, combining high quality programs from Israel and abroad. From 1982 onwards the Israel Festival was adopted by the City of Jerusalem and most shows are held within its boundaries.

The first festivals were directed by Zvi Propes. Yossi Tal-Gan served as the director of the festival from 1992 till 2014. While the festival's quality were widely recognized, there had been complaints about the high entrance fees to the performances.

Since 2014, General Director Eyal Sher and Artistic Director Itzik Giuli have led the festival. Dan Halperin heads the public board.

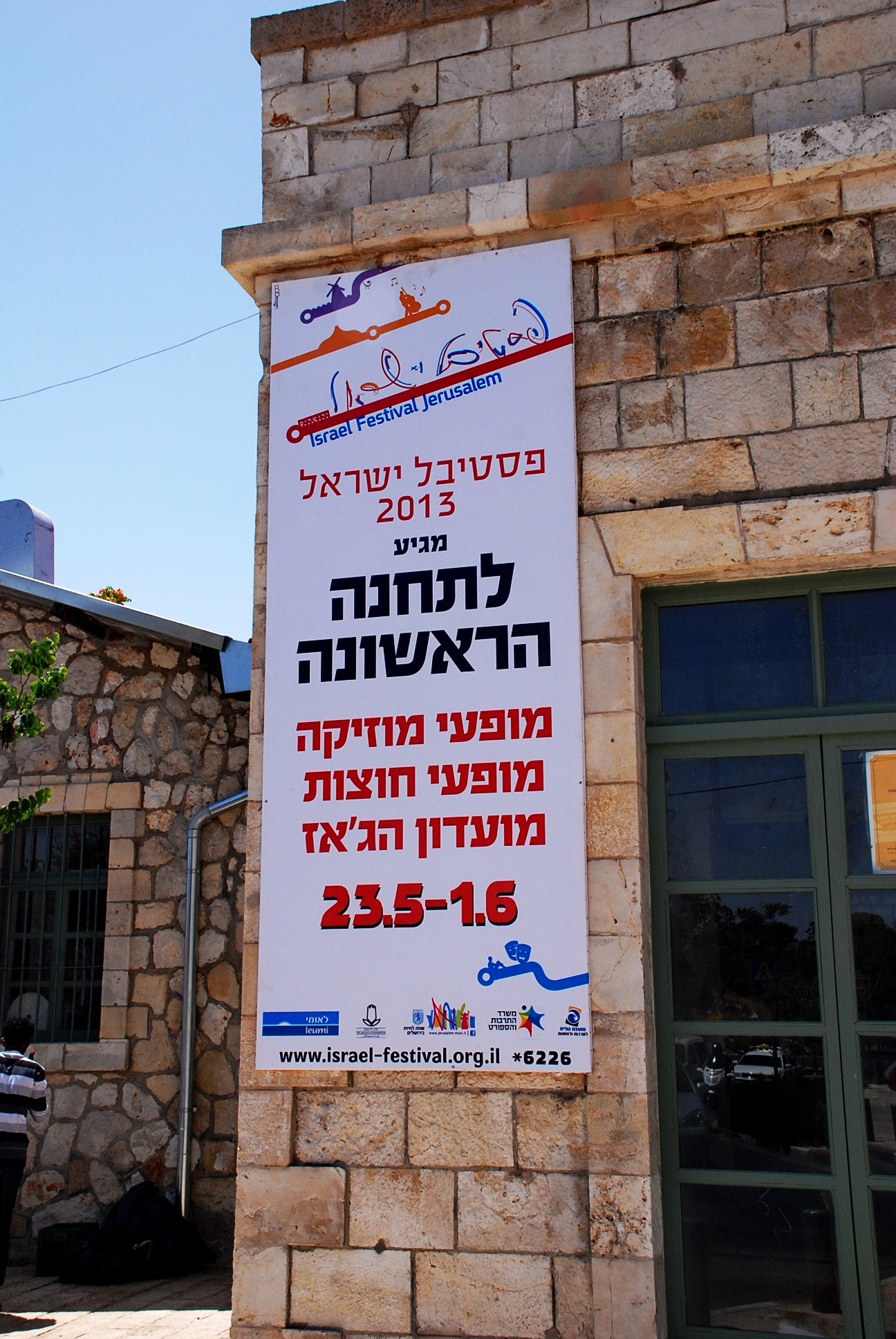

== See also ==
- Culture of Israel
- Music of Israel
- Israeli dance
- Theater of Israel
