= The Exchange (2011 film) =

2012 Israeli film

- Film poster
- Hebrew: ההתחלפות
- Directed by: Eran Kolirin
- Written by: Eran Kolirin
- Produced by: Eran Kolirin; Elon Ratzkovsky; Karl Baumgarten
- Starring: Dov Navon; Rotem Keinan; Sharon Tal; Shirili Deshe
- Cinematography: Shai Goldman
- Edited by: Arik Leibovitch
- Release dates: 7 September 2011 (Venice); 19 April 2012 (Israel)
- Running time: 94 minutes
- Countries: Israel; Germany
- Language: Hebrew

The Exchange (Hebrew: ההתחלפות; Hahithalfut) is a 2011 Israeli drama film directed by Eran Kolirin. The film was screened in competition at the 68th Venice International Film Festival in September 2011.

== Plot ==
Oded (Rotem Keinan) is an assistant lecturer at the Tel Aviv University and married to Tami (Sharon Tal), a young architect looking for a job. Oded becomes friends with a neighbour, Yoav (Dov Navon), and they become obsessed with breaking pre-ordained frames and examining their lives objectively.

== Cast ==
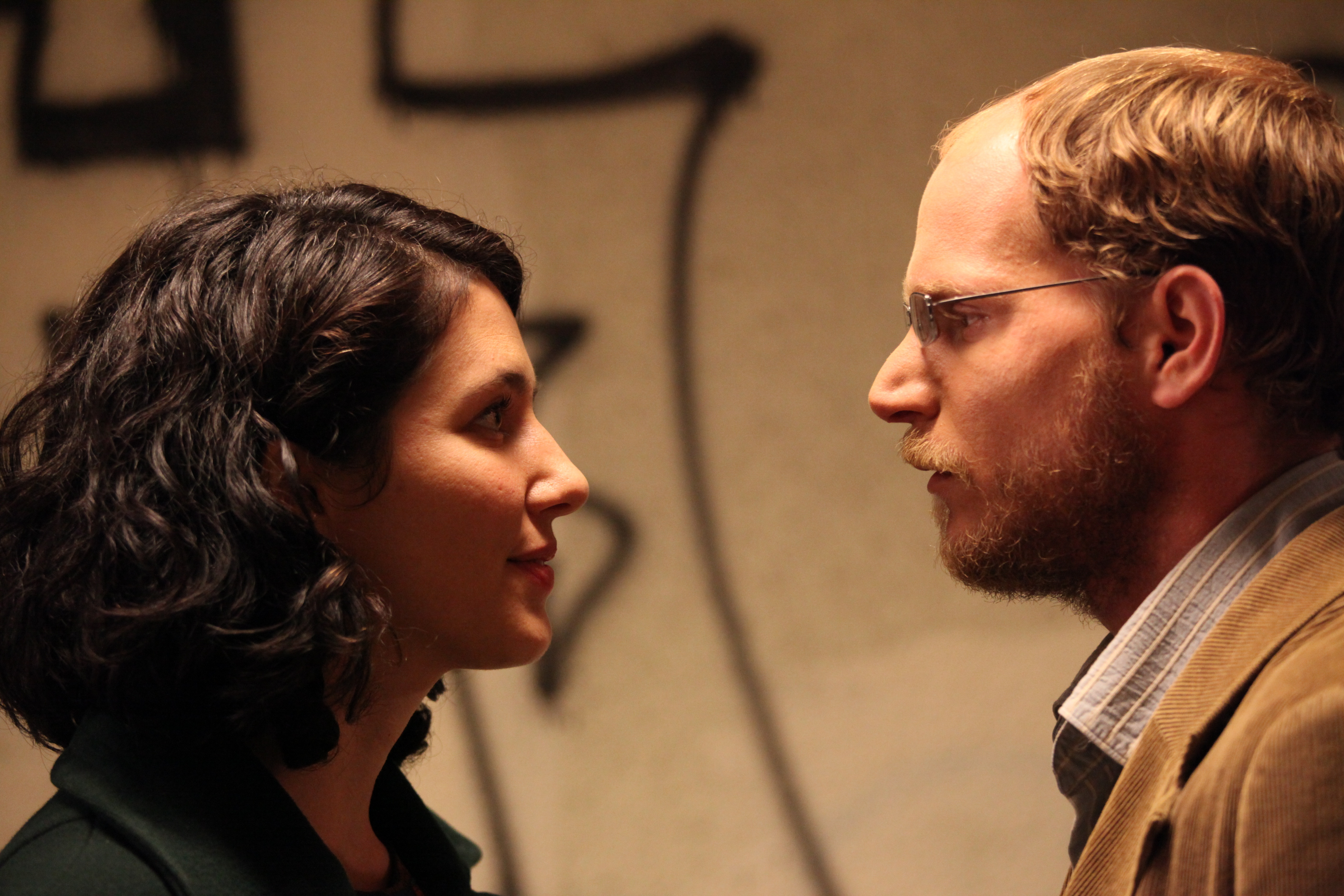
Rotem Keinan and Sharon Tal

- Dov Navon as Yoav
- Rotem Keinan as Oded
- Sharon Tal as Tami
- Shirili Deshe as Yael
