= Eran Kolirin =

Israeli screenwriter and film director (born 1973)

- ערן קולירין
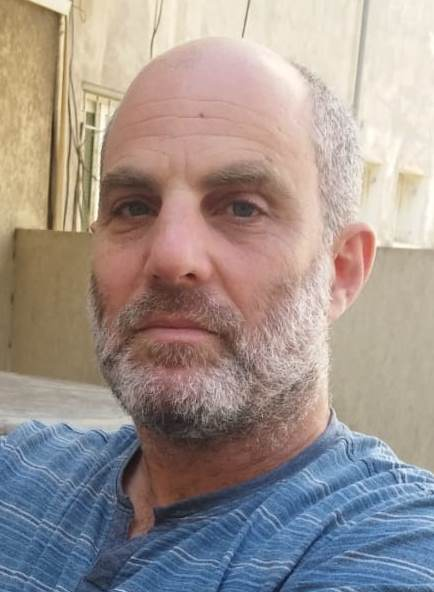
- Kolirin in 2018
- Born: 4 November 1973 (age 52); Holon
- Occupations: Screenwriter, film director

Eran Kolirin (Hebrew: ערן קולירין; born 4 November 1973) is an Israeli screenwriter and film director.

In 2004, he directed the feature-length television drama, The Long Journey. His cinema directorial debut, The Band's Visit (2007), was a critical success, winning eight Awards of the Israeli Film Academy and prizes at several international film festivals. Kolirin himself won the Israeli Film Academy's awards for Best Director and Best Screenplay.

His second film, The Exchange, was in competition at the 68th Venice International Film Festival in September 2011.

His next film, Beyond the Mountains and Hills, was selected to be screened in the Un Certain Regard section at the 2016 Cannes Film Festival. It was screened in film festivals around world, winning several awards, including Best Feature Film at the 2016 UK Jewish Film Festival.

== Selected filmography ==
- The Long Journey (2004)
- The Band's Visit (2007)
- The Exchange (2011)
- Beyond the Mountains and Hills (2016)
- Let There Be Morning (AKA Let It Be Morning) (2021)
