= Joseph Cedar =

Israeli film director and screenwriter

- יוסף סידר
- Born: 31 August 1968 (age 58); New York, United States
- Occupations: Film director Screenwriter
- Years active: 2000–present

Yossef (Joseph) Cedar (Hebrew: יוסף סידר; born August 31, 1968) is an American-Israeli film director and screenwriter.

== Biography ==
Cedar was born to an Orthodox Jewish family in New York City. His father is biochemist Howard Cedar. When Joseph was 6, his family moved to Israel, and he grew up in the Bayit VeGan neighborhood in Jerusalem. He studied in a Yeshiva High School. In the Israeli army he served as a paratrooper. After graduating in philosophy and history of theatre from the Hebrew University of Jerusalem, he studied cinema studies at New York University.

== Film career ==
When he returned to Israel, he started working on the screenplay for his debut film, Time of Favor (2000), for which he moved and lived for two years in the Israeli settlement Dolev. The film won six Ophir Awards, including Best Picture.

His second film was Campfire (2004), which won five Ophir Awards including Best Picture, with two, Best Director and Best Screenplay, going to Cedar. For Beaufort (2007), his third film, he received the Silver Bear award for Best Director in the Berlin International Film Festival. Beaufort received an Academy Award nomination for Best Foreign Language Film, the first such nomination for an Israeli film in 24 years. It received four Ophir Awards and was based on Cedar's own experiences during his army service on Israel's border with Lebanon.

His film Footnote premiered In Competition at the 2011 Cannes Film Festival. The film was nominated for the Academy Award for Best Foreign Language Film. He next wrote and directed Norman: The Moderate Rise and Tragic Fall of a New York Fixer, an American-Israeli political drama starring Richard Gere and Lior Ashkenazi. The film played at the 2016 Telluride Film Festival[6] and the 2016 Toronto International Film Festival.[7][8] and was released by Sony Pictures Classics. Norman: The Moderate Rise and Tragic Fall of a New York Fixer (Hebrew: נורמן: עלייתו המתונה ונפילתו התלולה של מאכער אמריקאי) (previously titled Oppenheimer Strategies) is a 2016 American-Israeli political drama film directed and written by Joseph Cedar. The film stars Richard Gere and Lior Ashkenazi. Filming began on February 8, 2015, in New York City. The film played at the 2016 Telluride Film Festival and the 2016 Toronto International Film Festival.

In 2019 he co-created, co-wrote and co-directed the HBO limited series "Our Boys" Our Boys (Hebrew: הנערים, Arabic: فتیان) is an American-Israeli television miniseries created by Hagai Levi, Joseph Cedar, and Tawfik Abu-Wael. The series focuses on the story of the kidnapping and murder of Mohammed Abu Khdeir.

The ten-episode series premiered on August 12, 2019, on HBO. It is a co-production between HBO and Keshet Studios.

In 2025 it was announced that Cedar will direct "Useful Idiots" starring Meryl Streep and Sigourney Weaver.

Cedar is an Orthodox Jew. His films are known to touch delicate issues of Israeli society. Israeli critic Yair Rave wrote, "One of the reasons I like Cedar's films so much is... his ability to merge the Israeli spirit... with the universal cinematic codes."

== Awards and recognition ==
He has won a Silver Bear and an Ophir Award for Best Director, and an Ophir Award for writing a Best Screenplay. He also won the best screenplay award at the 2011 Cannes Film Festival for his film Footnote (2011).

== Filmography ==
- Time of Favor (2000)
- Campfire (2004)
- Beaufort (2007)
- Footnote (2011)
- Norman (2016)

== Television ==
- Our Boys (2019)-producer and director.
- Constellation (2024), director
