= List of Israeli films of 2013 =

A list of films produced by the Israeli film industry released in 2013.

Premiere		Title	Director	Cast	Genre	Notes	Ref
F E B	10	Youth	Tom Shoval	Eitan Cunio, David Cunio, Moshe Ivgy	Drama		
F E B	14	Bananot	Eytan Fox	Yael Bar-Zohar, Dana Ivgi, Denis Sandler	Comedy		
F E B	14	Up the Wrong Tree	Gur Bentvich	Sarah Adler, Sasha Agronov, Gur Bentvich	Drama		
A P R	21	The A.R.K. Report	Shmuel Hoffman	Katy Castaldi, Pascal Yen-Pfister, Ayden Crispe	Sci-fi, drama		
M A R	14	Song Number 6	Eytan Fox	Dana Ivgy, Efrat Dor, Ofer Shechter	Comedy		
J U N	15	Son of God	Erez Tadmoor	Makram Khoury	Drama		
J U L	4	Hunting Elephants	Reshef Levi	Sasson Gabai, Moni Moshonov, Patrick Stewart, Gil Blank	Crime comedy		
A U G	15	Big Bad Wolves	Aharon Keshales, Navot Papushado	Lior Ashkenazi, Kais Nashif, Ami Weinberg	Comedy, crime, thriller		
O C T	15	Dawn	Romed Wyder	Jason Isaacs, Liron Levo, Joel Basman	Drama		
N O V	15	On the Side of the Road	Lia Tarachansky		Documentary		

== Announced and unscheduled releases ==
Title	Director	Cast	Genre	Notes	Ref
Allan Quatermain and the Jewel of the East	Menahem Golan		Action, adventure		
Hanna's Journey	Julia von Heinz	Karoline Schuch, Suzanne von Borsody, Max Mauff	Comedy, romance		
Cry of Ogg	Moshe Alpert				
Beam Me Up, Sasha!	Ganit Orian	Amiram Eini	Romance, sci-fi		
10% My Child	Uri Bar-On	Yali Friedman	Drama		
Only in New York	Ghazi Albuliwi		Comedy, drama, romance		
No, Prime Minister	Dan Katzir		Comedy		
Rascals Dawn	Yoav Netanyahu		Drama		
The Chosen Spy	Yuval Ovadia		Thriller		

== See also ==
- 2013 in Israel
