= 2023 Canneseries =

2023 television festival

2023 Cannes International Series Festival
- Location: Cannes, France
- Founded: 2018
- Awards: Best Series (“Power Play”)
- Festival date: 14–19 April 2023
- Website: canneseries.com/en

Canneseries
- 2024 2022

The 6th Cannes International Series Festival is a television festival that took place from 14 to 19 April 2023 in Cannes, France. This year marks the debut of the Documentary section.

The Best Series award went to the Norwegian political comedy series Power Play.

== Juries ==
The following juries were named for the festival.

=== Competition ===
- Lior Raz, Israeli actor and screenwriter, Jury President
- Shirine Boutella, Algerian actress
- Zabou Breitman, French actress and director
- Stewart Copeland, American composer
- Daryl McCormack, Irish actor

=== Short Form Competition ===
- Los Javis (Javier Calvo and Javier Ambrossi), Spanish directors, Jury Presidents
- Marina Rollman, Swiss comedian
- Simona Tabasco, Italian actress

=== Documentary Competition ===
- Asif Kapadia, British film director, Jury President
- Mélissa Theuriau, French producer and journalist
- Nathalie Marchak, French screenwriter and director

== Official selection ==
=== In competition ===
The following series were selected to compete:

| Title | Original title | Creator(s) | Production countrie(s) | Network |
|---|---|---|---|---|
| Bargain | Ransom | Byun Seung-min | South Korea | TVING, Paramount+ |
| Carthago | | Reshef Levi & Tomer Shani & Yannets Levi | Israel | Kan 11 |
| Childhood Dreams | De Droom van de Jeugd | Marnie Blok & Bram Schouw & Idse Grotenhuis | Netherlands | KRO-NCRV, NPO 1 |
| Corduroy | | Hadas Ben Aroya | Israel | Hot |
| Dead Ringers | | Alice Birch | United States | Prime Video |
| Good Morning Chuck (Or the Art of Harm Reduction) | Bon matin Chuck (ou l'art de réduire les méfaits) | Nicolas Pinson & Jean-François Rivard & Mathieu Cyr & Émilie Lemay-Perreault | Canada | Bell Media, Crave |
| Power Play | Makta | Silje Storstein & Kristin Grue & Johan Fasting | Norway | NRK |
| Prisoner | Huset | Kim Fupz Aakeson | Denmark | DR |
| Spinners | | Benjamin Hoffman & Joachim Landau | France, South Africa | Showmax, Canal+, Canal+ Afrique |
| Tapie | | Tristan Séguéla & Olivier Demangel | France | Netflix |

=== Short Form Competition ===
The following series were selected to compete:

| Title | Original title | Creator(s) | Production countrie(s) | Network |
|---|---|---|---|---|
| Appetite | | Mohini Herse | Australia | SBS |
| Easy Peasy | MannDag | Fridtjof Stensæth Josefsen | Norway | NRK |
| Groundbreaking | | Patrick William Smith | Ireland, United States | —N/a |
| L'air d'aller | | Jean-Christophe Réhel | Canada | Télé-Québec |
| The Left-Handed Son | El hijo zurdo | Rafael Cobos | Spain | Movistar Plus+ |
| Missing | Se Busca | Mariano Pozzi | Argentina | UN3 |
| Out of Touch | Handen på Hjärtat | Mikael Ljung | Sweden | C More |
| Roomies | | Kato De Boeck & Flo Van Deuren | Belgium | VRT 1 |
| Streams Flow from a River | | Christopher Yip | Canada | Super Channel |
| Terrain Sensible | Marseille mon amour | Aurélie Meimon & Daphné Chollet & Nicolas Lopez & Emma Benestan | France | Arte |

=== Documentary Competition ===
The following series were selected to compete:

| Title | Original title | Creator(s) | Production countrie(s) | Network |
|---|---|---|---|---|
| The Chevaline Killings: Finding the Missing Piece | Chevaline | Brendan Kemmet | France | —N/a |
| Draw for Change! | | Vincent Coen & Guillaume Vandenberghe | Belgium | Arte, VRT, RTBF, SWR, WDR |
| Juan Carlos: Downfall of the King | Juan Carlos: Liebe, Geld, Verrat | Christian Beetz | Germany | Sky |
| Lac-Mégantic: This Is Not an Accident | Lac-Mégantic - ceci n'est pas un accident | Philippe Falardeau | Canada | VRAI |
| Miracle N°71 | Mirakel N°71 | Nathalie Basteyns | Belgium | VRT |
| Reading Again Mafalda | Releyendo Mafalda | —N/a | Argentina | Disney+ |

=== Out of competition ===
The following series were screened out of competition:

| Title | Original title | Creator(s) | Production countrie(s) | Network |
|---|---|---|---|---|
| The Brigade | B.R.I | Jérémie Guez & Erwan Augoyard | France | Canal+ |
| Fatal Attraction | | Alexandra Cunningham & Kevin J. Hynes | United States | Paramount+ |
| The Marvelous Mrs. Maisel (season 5) | | Amy Sherman-Palladino | United States | Prime Video |
| Silo | | Graham Yost | United Kingdom | Apple TV+ |

== Awards ==
The following awards were presented at the festival:

- Best Series: Power Play by Silje Storstein, Kristin Grue and Johan Fasting
- Best Screenplay: Jeon Woo-sung, Choi Byeong-yun and Kwak Jae-min for Bargain
- Best Music: Kåre Christoffer Vestrheim, Andrea Louise Horstad, Kristoffer Lo and Eivind Helgerød for Power Play
- Best Performance: Dar Zuzovsky for Corduroy
- Special Interpretation Award: Carthago
- High School Award for Best Series: Carthago by Reshef Levi, Tomer Shani and Yannets Levi
- Best Short Form Series: The Left-Handed Son by Rafael Cobos
- Student Award for Best Short Form Series: L'air d'aller by Jean-Christophe Réhel
- Best Documentary Series: Draw for Change! by Vincent Coen and Guillaume Vandenberghe

=== Special awards ===
The following honorary awards were presented at the festival:

- Canal+ Icon Award: Sarah Michelle Gellar
- Madame Figaro Rising Star Award: Morfydd Clark
- Konbini Commitment Award: Joey Soloway
