= Michael Swissa =

Israeli musical artist

Michael Swissa מיכאל סוויסה
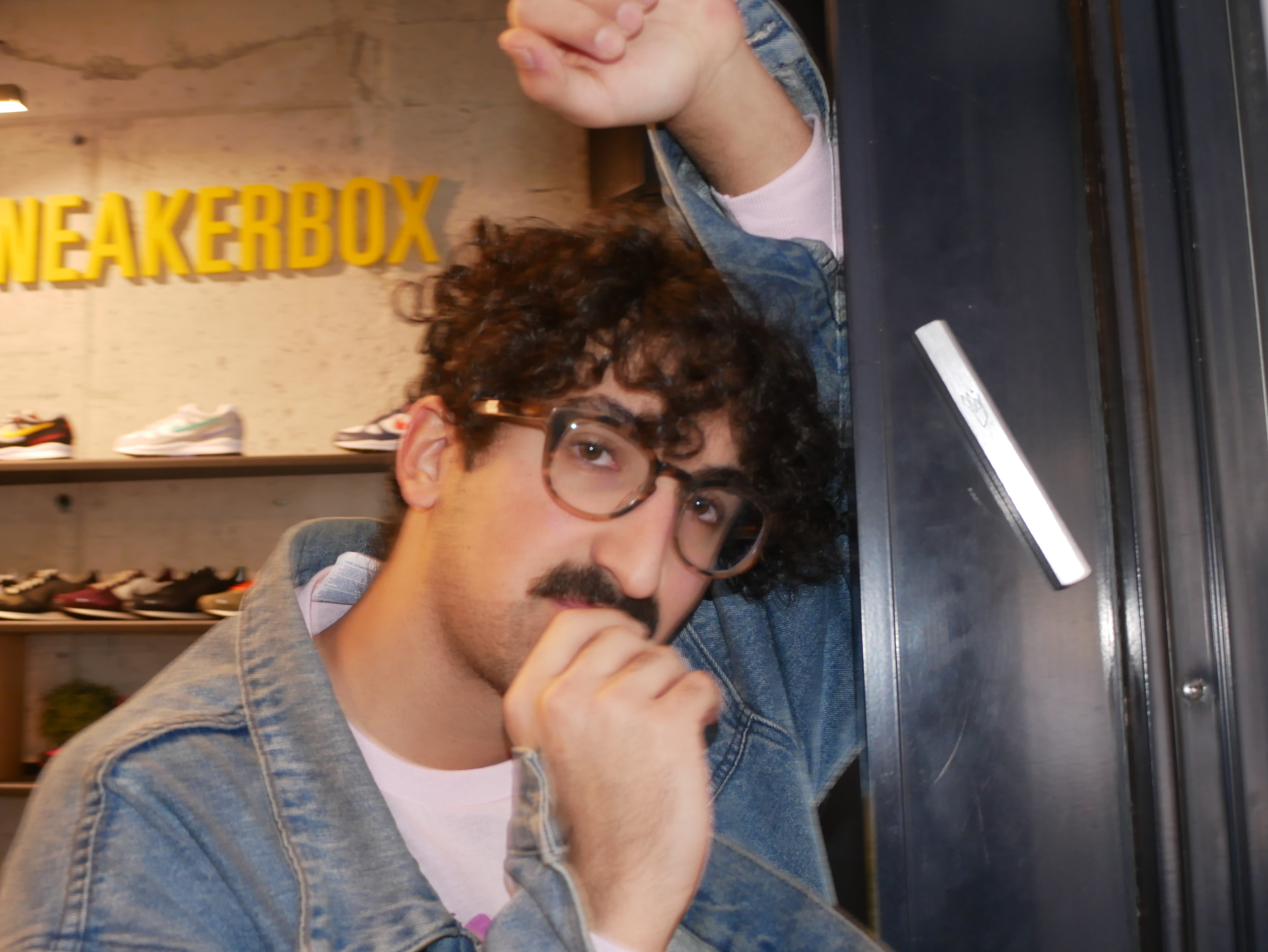
- Swissa in 2019

Background information
- Also known as: Swissa
- Born: January 10, 1996 (age 30)
- Origin: Tel Aviv, Israel
- Genres: Hip hop; trap
- Occupations: Rapper; singer; songwriter
- Years active: 2014–present

Michael Swissa (Hebrew: מיכאל סוויסה; born January 10, 1996), or simply Swissa, is an Israeli rapper, singer and songwriter.

== Biography ==
Swissa is the son of the Israeli actor Meir Swissa and Ruti, the daughter of Israeli singer Yafa Yarkoni. His brother is Israeli record producer Yishai Swissa.

He began his career in 2014, after he released his first song "Krav Maga" (Hebrew: קרב מגע).

In 2016 he appeared on humorist clips on the Israeli series "Good Night with Asaf Harel" on Channel 10. Also in 2016, he released his debut album Swissa Lanetzach (stylized as #SwissaForever; Hebrew: סוויסה לנצח, סוויסהלנצח#), the album includes guest appearances from Itay Lukach and Ori Shochat. In 2018 he released his first mixtape Male Be'atzmi (English stylized: FullOfMyself; Hebrew: מלא בעצמי), the mixtape includes guest appearances from Tal Tirangel, Michael Moshonov and more.

In 2019 he collaborated with McDonald's Israel on campaign with the song "Ach Yakar Tzover" (Hebrew: אח יקר צובר) featuring Achshtaim.

== Discography ==
- #SwissaLanetzach (2016)
- FullOfMyself (2018)
- Glisha Baseter (with Michael Cohen) (2019)
