= Cohen@Mushon =

Israeli hip hop duo

Cohen@Mushon כהן@מושון
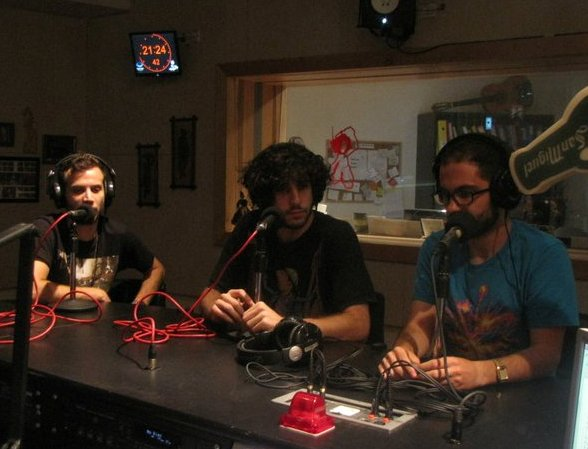

Background information
- Origin: Tel Aviv, Israel
- Genres: Hip hop
- Years active: 2008–2018
- Labels: Shigola; Unicell; Hed Artzi; Hi Fidelity; Vibetown
- Members: Michael Cohen; Michael Moshonov; DJ Mesh (producer, DJ)

Cohen@Mushon (Hebrew: כהן@מושון; pronounced Cohen At Mushon) are an Israeli hip hop duo comprising the rapper and record producer Michael Cohen and the actor Michael Moshonov. their musical producer and DJ is DJ Mesh. The rappers call themselves by the stage names "Cohen" and "Mushon" in reference to their last names, because they are both have the same first name, "Michael".

Cohen@Mushon's musical style is influenced mainly from the international hip hop scene.

== Music ==
Cohen and Moshonov got acquainted through mutual friends in high school when they were 16 years old. They started to perform music at the beginning of the 2000s.

In 2008 Hed Arzi released Kosher Gufani (Hebrew: כושר גופני), Cohen@Mushon debut album, the album produced by Cohen himself and Ori Shochat. at the same year they were nominated on the MTV Europe Music Award for Best Israeli Act. after 3 years, In 2011 they released their second album, Machshev Lekol Yeled (Hebrew: מחשב לכל ילד) which got many praises. After 6 years, in 2016 they released their third album Yamim Arukim (Hebrew: ימים ארוכים), the album includes guest appearances from Peter Roth, Ravid Plotnik, Michael Swissa, Peled and the actors Ido Mosseri and Dana Frider. the album contains samples from songs of Arik Einstein, that was a good friend of Mushon's father Moni Moshonov, the album produced by Cohen@Mushon and Ori Shochat includes guest production by the international record producer The Alchemist in the song Ein Shum Be'aya (Hebrew: אין שום בעיה).

== Discography ==
=== Studio albums ===
- Kosher Gufani (2008, Hed Artzi)
- Machshev Lekol Yeled (2011, Hi Fidelity)
- Yamim Arukim (2016, Unicell)

=== Mixtapes ===
- Chroimal’e MeKohav Moshe (2013, Vibetown)
- Havai Ve'Bidur (with DJ Mesh) (2016, Shigola)
