= PCAC =

PCAC may refer to:

- Pacific Coast Athletic Conference
- Palestinian Child Arts Center
- Partially conserved axial current
- Payment & Clearing Association of China
