= Cave of the Patriarchs massacre =

1994 shooting massacre in Hebron

- Part of Israeli settler violence during the Israeli–Palestinian conflict
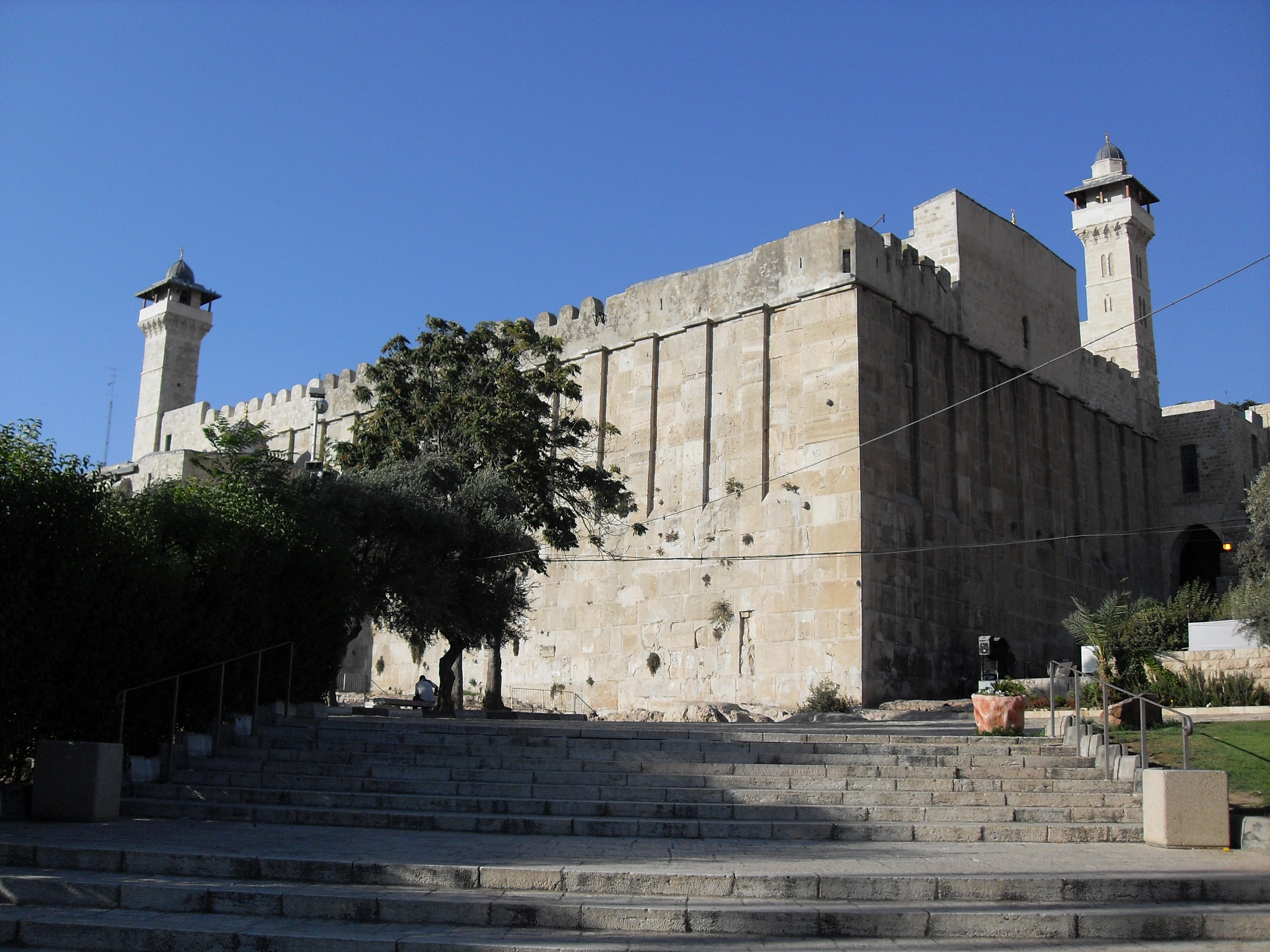
- The compound in 2009

- Location of Hebron within the West Bank Location of Hebron within the de jure State of Palestine
- Location: Hebron, West Bank
- Date: February 25, 1994; 32 years ago
- Target: Muslim worshippers
- Attack type: Jewish religious terrorism, mass murder, mass shooting
- Weapon: IMI Galil
- Deaths: 30 (including the perpetrator)
- Injuries: 125
- Perpetrator: Baruch Goldstein
- Motive: Anti-Palestinian racism, Jewish extremism

On 25 February 1994, Baruch Goldstein, an American-Israeli physician and member of the far-right ultra-Zionist Kach movement, carried out a mass shooting of Palestinians who were praying in the Ibrahimi Mosque (Cave of the Patriarchs) in Hebron. Goldstein, dressed in Israeli army uniform, opened fire with an assault rifle and killed 29 people, including children as young as 12, and wounded 125 others. Goldstein was overpowered and beaten to death by survivors.

The atrocity, which occurred during the Jewish holiday of Purim and the Islamic holy month of Ramadan, strained the Israeli-Palestinian Oslo Accords peace process, immediately setting off mass protests by Palestinians throughout the West Bank. During the ensuing clashes, 20 to 26 Palestinians were killed while 120 were injured in confrontations with the Israeli military, and 9 Israeli Jews were also killed.

Goldstein was widely denounced in Israel and by communities in the Jewish diaspora, with many attributing his act to insanity. Israeli prime minister Yitzhak Rabin condemned the attack, describing Goldstein as a "degenerate murderer" and "a shame on Zionism and an embarrassment to Judaism". Some Jewish settlers in Hebron lauded him as a hero, viewing his attack as a pre-emptive strike and his subsequent death as an act of martyrdom. Following statements in support of Goldstein's actions, the Jewish ultranationalist Kach party was banned and designated a terrorist organization by the Israeli government.

== Background of Baruch Goldstein ==
In the 1970s, Baruch Goldstein, who was born and lived in Brooklyn, New York, was a charter member of the Jewish Defense League. After emigrating to Israel in 1983, he served as a physician in the Israel Defense Forces, first as a conscript, then in the reserve forces. Following the end of his active duty, Goldstein worked as a physician and lived in the Kiryat Arba settlement near Hebron, where he served as an emergency doctor. Goldstein became involved with Kach, and maintained a strong personal relationship with Kahane, whose views, regarded by the Israeli government as racist, had caused his party to be banned from the Knesset in 1988. Kahane was assassinated in 1990 by Arab terrorist El Sayyid Nosair in New York City, and Goldstein reportedly swore to take revenge for the killing. Goldstein was elected to Kiryat Arba city council and in this capacity assisted in establishing a memorial park dedicated to Kahane.

In 1981, Goldstein wrote a letter, published in The New York Times, which said that Israel "must act decisively to remove the Arab minority from within its borders", which "could be accomplished by initially offering encouragement and incentives to Arabs to leave of their own accord". In October 1993, inside the Ibrahimi mosque, acid was poured over the floor, leaving giant holes in the carpets, and six worshippers were assaulted. From the evidence of the sanctuary guards, Goldstein was identified as the culprit. A letter was written to Yitzhak Rabin, the then Israeli Prime Minister, by the Muslim authorities "regarding the dangers" of Goldstein and asking for action to be taken to prevent daily violations of the mosque. Four years before the massacre, an agent of Shin Bet, the Israeli internal security service, who had infiltrated Kach, passed a warning to his superiors about the danger posed by Goldstein. The agent ascribed to Goldstein the statement, "There will be a day when one Jew will take revenge on the Arabs."

In Hebron, as elsewhere in the West Bank, tensions ran high after the Oslo Accords were signed in 1993. Israeli sociologist Baruch Kimmerling however noted that before the massacre, "expressions of Palestinian armed resistance were rare and lacked broad popular support, despite the growing colonization of the West Bank and obstacles to Palestinian economic growth." On 6 December 1993, Goldstein's close friend Mordechai Lapid and his son Shalom Lapid were killed in Hebron. As the settlement's emergency responder, Goldstein was present at the murder scene, and he referred to the killers as "nazis".

As the settlement's main emergency doctor, Goldstein was involved in treating victims of Arab-Israeli violence prior to that incident as well. He expressed anti-Arab feelings far before the massacre. Israeli press reports stated that Goldstein refused to treat Arabs, even those serving in the IDF; this was also reflected in comments by his acquaintances. He was known to refuse to treat Druze soldiers who served in the West Bank, claiming that it was against Jewish laws to treat non-Jews.

== Massacre ==
The date 25 February 1994 coincided with the Jewish festival of Purim and fell during the Muslim Ramadan. On the eve of the massacre, Goldstein listened to a reading in the Hall of Abraham of the Scroll of Esther, and spoke to others of the need to behave like Esther. The festival of Purim was associated with a reading that concerns Amalek, with whom, in Israeli extremist rhetoric, Palestinians are often identified. Joseph Tuman has conjectured he saw himself as Mordecai. Ian Lustick thinks it likely Goldstein thought of Yasser Arafat as a modern-day Haman. Both Jews and Muslims were permitted to access their respective parts of the compound. At 5:00 a.m. on February 25, around 800 Palestinian Muslims passed through the east gate of the cave to participate in Fajr, the first of the five daily Islamic prayers. The cave was under Israeli Army guard, but of the nine soldiers supposed to have been on duty, four were late turning up, and only one officer was there.

Shortly afterwards, passing through the Hall of Abraham, Goldstein entered the Hall of Isaac, where some 800 Muslims were at prayer. He was dressed in his army uniform and carried an IMI Galil assault rifle and four magazines of ammunition, which held a total of 140 rounds in 35 rounds per magazine. He was not stopped by the guards, who assumed that he was an officer entering the tomb to pray in an adjacent chamber reserved for Jews. Standing in front of the only exit from the hall and positioned to the rear of the Muslim worshippers, he is reported as having thrown a grenade into the middle of the hall before opening fire, eventually killing 29 people and wounding another 125, among them children. Several people were left with paralyzing wounds. According to survivors, Goldstein bided his time until sujūd, the part of the prayer where worshippers prostrate themselves with their heads on the floor. He was overcome when someone in the crowd hurled a fire extinguisher which struck him on the head, allowing the crowd to disarm and then beat him to death.

Reports after the massacre were often contradictory. There was initial uncertainty about whether Goldstein had acted alone; it was reported that eyewitnesses had seen "another man, also dressed as a soldier, handing him ammunition". There were many testimonies that made mention of Israeli guards outside the cave having opened fire. Israeli military officials claim that no Israeli troops fired on the Palestinian worshippers. However, The New York Times interviewed over 40 Palestinian eyewitnesses, many of whom were confined to hospital beds with gunshot wounds, and thus "unable to compare notes". All witnesses corroborated that three Israeli guards opened fire, likely in panic amid the confusion, as the Muslims fled the shrine, with at least one soldier firing into the crowd. During the inquiry, an Israeli Army official said three worshippers died in the stampede following the attack and five Palestinians were killed in street riots within Hebron later that day.

The testimony of various Israeli military officials was often contradictory. For instance, Danny Yatom asserted that two of the guards had fired six or seven shots in the confusion "but only in the air", while the two guards themselves, sergeants Kobi Yosef and Niv Drori, later testified to firing four shots "chest high". The guards' testimony was also at odds with the testimony of their ranking officer in claiming they had seen another Jewish settler enter the cave bearing arms. Tikva Honig-Parnass wrote that 10 Palestinians were killed and more than 100 injured by Israeli soldiers who continued to shoot at those who were trying to flee the mosque, at those who were evacuating the wounded, and at people who were rioting at the Ahli hospital. Arafat Baya’at, for one, is reported as having been shot dead by Israeli troops outside the hospital when he picked up a stone to throw at soldiers after seeing a friend of his being carried out of an ambulance. Several Palestinian survivors have told that they believe Israeli soldiers collaborated with Goldstein, stating there were fewer soldiers than usual at the mosque, and that exclusively on that day the metal detector was turned-off and no-one conducted searches: "they [the soldiers] were relaxed and laughing, they didn't think anybody was going to get out alive", said one man who was left paralyzed as a result of being shot by Goldstein.

== Violence in the aftermath ==
As word of the incident spread throughout the occupied territories, confrontations broke out in which a further 20 Palestinians were killed and 120 injured.

=== In Israel ===
Two separate suicide bombings took place in April 1994, carried out by Palestinian militants inside Israel and launched by Hamas' Izzedine al-Qassam Brigades in retaliation for the massacre carried out by Goldstein. A total of 8 Israeli civilians were killed and 55 wounded in the first attack, which took place in Afula on 6 April, at the end of the forty-day mourning period for Goldstein's victims. Six more were killed and 30 injured in Hadera bus station suicide bombing a week later. Those were the first suicide bombings carried out by Palestinian militants inside Israel. According to Matti Steinberg, then Shin Bet head's advisor on Palestinian affairs, Hamas had until then refrained from attacking civilian targets inside Israel, and the change in this policy was a result of Goldstein's massacre.

=== In the United States ===
Four days after the massacre, on 1 March 1994, on the Brooklyn Bridge in New York City, Lebanese-born immigrant Rashid Baz shot at a van of 15 Chabad-Lubavitch Orthodox Jewish students, killing one and injuring three others. During the shooting spree, the gunman reportedly shouted in Arabic "Kill the Jews", expressing revenge for the massacre four days prior.

== Palestinian casualties ==
Goldstein murdered 29 Palestinians in the attack, including six children fourteen years old or younger. Several people were left with paralyzing wounds. In an article commemorating the event's 20th anniversary, Al Jazeera reported that local Palestinians estimated the total number of deaths to be between 50 and 70, with an additional 250 people injured that day.

== Response ==
=== Israeli government ===
The Kach movement, with which Goldstein was affiliated, was outlawed as a terrorist organization after issuing statements supporting Goldstein. The cabinet decided to confiscate the weapons of a small number they regarded as right-wing extremists and put them in administrative detention, all the while denying the PLO's request that all settlers be disarmed and that an international force be established to protect Palestinians from Israeli aggression. The Israeli government also took extreme measures against Palestinians following the massacre, banning them from certain streets in Hebron, such as Al-Shuhada Street, where many Palestinians have homes and businesses, and opening them to the exclusive access of Jewish Israelis and foreign tourists.

In an address to the Knesset, Prime Minister Yitzhak Rabin denounced Goldstein. Rabin, addressing not just Goldstein and his legacy, but also other settlers he regarded as militant, declared,

You are not part of the community of Israel... You are not part of the national democratic camp which we all belong to in this house, and many of the people despise you. You are not partners in the Zionist enterprise. You are a foreign implant. You are an errant weed. Sensible Judaism spits you out. You placed yourself outside the wall of Jewish law... We say to this horrible man and those like him: you are a shame on Zionism and an embarrassment to Judaism.

Rabin considered that his failure to close down the Jewish settlements in Hebron after the massacre one of his greatest political mistakes. He was himself assassinated by another right-wing extremist one and a half years later, after signing the Oslo Accords.

Benjamin Netanyahu, then head of the opposition Likud party, declared, "This was a despicable crime. I express my unequivocal condemnation."

==== Shamgar Commission ====
The Israeli government appointed a commission of inquiry headed by then president of the Supreme Court, Judge Meir Shamgar. The commission in the epilogue to its report called the massacre "a base and murderous act, in which innocent people bending in prayer to their maker were killed". Among its specific conclusions were:

- Goldstein acted alone in planning the massacre, telling no one of his scheme.
- Coordination between the IDF, the police, and the Civil Administration was problematic.
- The political leadership and security forces could not have been expected to predict the massacre.
- Testimony from survivors referring to IDF assistance and grenade explosions in the massacre was found to be contradictory and inconsistent; investigators did not find any grenade fragments.
- There were, as claimed by some Jews seeking to justify Goldstein's actions as a preemptive strike, substantial warnings of a coming Hamas terror attack against Jews. It further stated:

8.2a "... warnings were issued regarding an expected attack by Hamas following the distribution of its leaflets in Hebron."
8.7a "Following an incident in Abu-Dis, which ended in the deaths of a number of members of Az-A-Din Al-Qassam [of Hamas], emotions ran high among the Moslem worshipers (about two hundred), who shouted hostile slogans ("Qassam", "kill the Jews"), [at the Jewish worshipers], making it necessary to call in army and Border Police forces. According to one of the Moslem witnesses, the Jews also shouted hostile slogans." (This is in reference to persons present on the previous evening.)
8.8a "Those in charge of security at the Tomb were given no intelligence reports that an attack by a Jew against Moslem worshipers could be expected, particularly since intelligence reports warned of the opposite: an attack by Hamas. Therefore, there was concern about an attack by Arabs against Jews."

Critics of the commission have suggested that Shamgar's judicial record has "consistently displayed his leniency toward the settlers, including those convicted of crimes against the Palestinians, but especially toward the soldiers who had fired at the Palestinians" and that his career reflected a history of pro-settler activism by promoting expropriation of Palestinian land to Jewish settlement that is against international law.

=== Israeli public ===
There was widespread condemnation of the massacre in Israel immediately following the attack. The Jewish Settler Council declared that the act was "not Jewish, not humane". A poll found that 78.8% of Israeli adults condemned the Hebron massacre, while 3.6% praised Goldstein. A 2023 poll indicates 10% of Israeli Jews see Goldstein as a hero, 57% as a terrorist, and the rest are undecided.

Most religious leaders denounced the attack. The Sephardi Chief Rabbi said "I am simply ashamed that a Jew carried out such a villainous and irresponsible act", and suggested that he be buried outside the cemetery. His Ashkenazi counterpart, Yisrael Meir Lau, called it "a desecration of God's name". Rabbi Yehuda Amital of Gush Etzion said Goldstein had "besmirched the Jewish nation and the Torah". Some rabbis reacted with ambivalence to the massacre, and a few praised Goldstein and called his undertaking "an act of martyrdom". At Goldstein's funeral, Rabbi Yaacov Perrin claimed that even one million Arabs are "not worth a Jewish fingernail". In eulogizing Goldstein, Rabbi Israel Ariel called him a "holy martyr", and questioned the innocence of the victims by claiming they were responsible for the massacre of Hebron's Jews in 1929. Rabbi Dov Lior of Kiryat Arba said he was a saint whose "hands are innocent, his heart pure", and compared him to the martyrs of the Holocaust. At the time, settler rabbi Yitzhak Ginzburgh was the only prominent Orthodox rabbi who praised the massacre. He has since been detained several times for espousing extremist views.

==== Veneration of Goldstein ====
In the weeks following the massacre, a group of around 10,000 Jews traveled to Hebron to protest the Israeli government's response to the massacre - namely, for considering the removal of the 450 Jews that lived there. Of this group, hundreds came to Goldstein's grave to celebrate Goldstein's actions. The New York Times report states that though "Israelis who worship the Brooklyn-born Dr. Goldstein are a small minority... they may be more than the minuscule fraction the Government claims."

In a pamphlet titled Baruch HaGever (Note: ברוך הגבר; meaning both Baruch the Man and "blessed be the man". From Jeremiah 17:7) published in 1994, and a book of the same name in 1995, various rabbis praised Goldstein's action as a pre-emptive strike in response to Hamas threats of a pogrom and wrote that it is possible to view his act as following five Halachic principles.

The phenomenon of the adoration of Goldstein's tomb persisted for years, despite Israeli government efforts to crack down on those making pilgrimage to Goldstein's grave site. The grave's epitaph said that Goldstein "gave his life for the people of Israel, its Torah and land". In 1999, after the passing of Israeli legislation outlawing monuments to terrorists, the Israeli army dismantled the shrine that had been built to Goldstein at the site of his interment. In the years after the dismantling of the shrine, radical Jewish settlers would celebrate Purim by invoking the memory of the massacre, sometimes even dressing up themselves or their children to look like Goldstein.

=== Jewish diaspora ===
In the United Kingdom, Chief Rabbi Jonathan Sacks stated,

Such an act is an obscenity and a travesty of Jewish values. That it should have been perpetrated against worshippers in a house of prayer at a holy time makes it a blasphemy as well... Violence is evil. Violence committed in the name of God is doubly evil. Violence against those engaged in worshipping God is unspeakably evil.

An editorial in The Jewish Chronicle written by Chaim Bermant denounced the Kach organisation to which Goldstein belonged as "Neo-Nazis" and a U.S. creation, funded by American money and a product of American gun culture. The same edition also reported that some Liberal synagogues in the UK had begun fundraising for Goldstein's victims.

=== Palestinian public ===
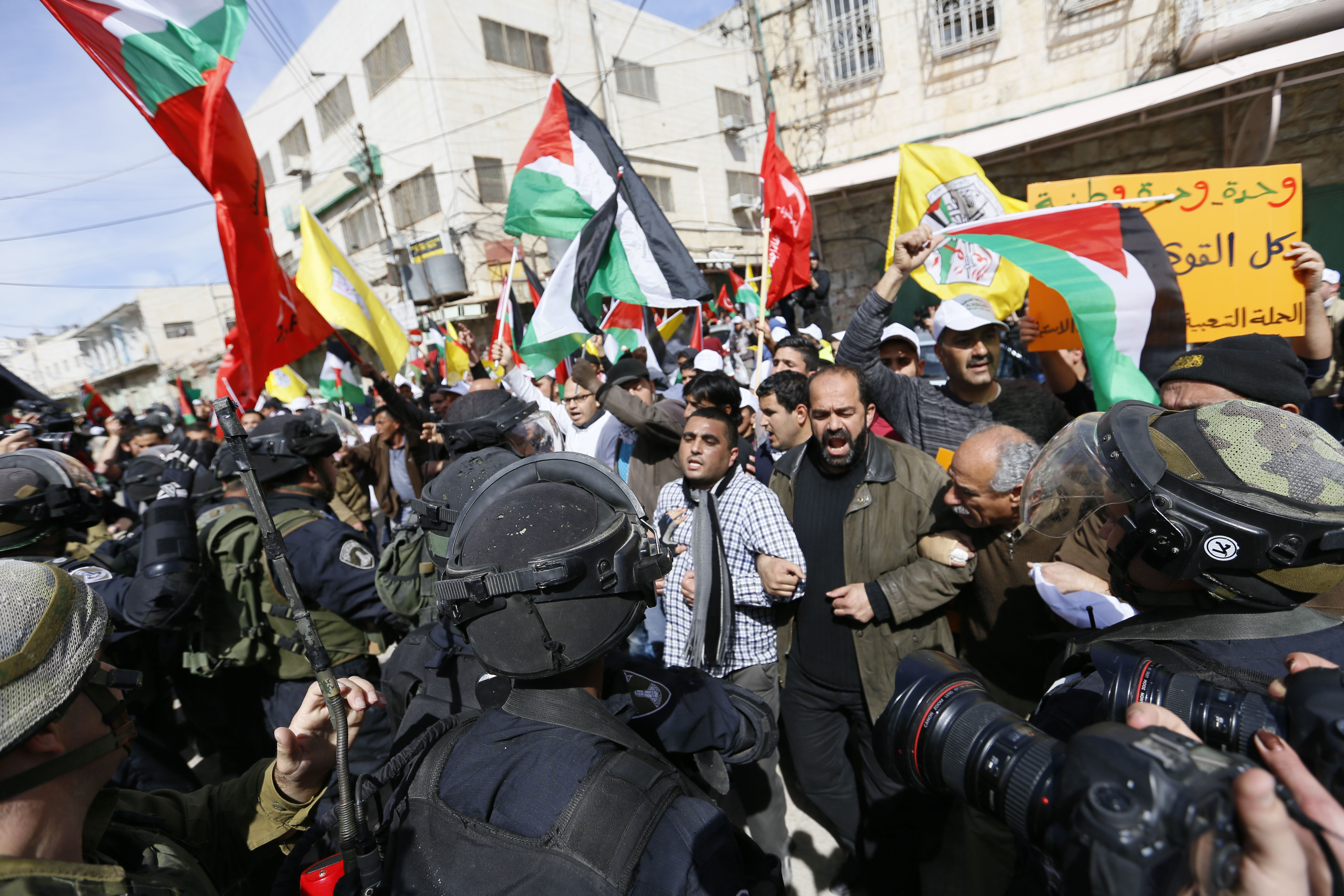
Israeli security forces preventing Palestinians from entering Al-Shuhada Street during a demonstration on the 20th anniversary of the massacre

Palestinian protesters took to the streets in the aftermath of the massacre. There were widespread protests and clashes in both the occupied territories and within Israel itself, in Nazareth and Jaffa.

Sociologist Baruch Kimmerling wrote that the massacre "created perceptions of religious warfare." He also argued that the attack formed the roots of the Second Intifada.

As a reaction to the trauma-induced in children in Hebron, the Palestinian Child Arts Center (PCAC), a non-governmental, nonprofit organization was founded. The activities of the centre primarily involve the intellectual development of Palestinian children, and to reinforce a positive role for the child within Palestinian society and culture.

=== United Nations ===
The United Nations Security Council adopted Resolution 904 condemning the massacre and called for measures to protect Palestinian civilians including disarming Israeli settlers.

== See also ==
- List of massacres in the Palestinian territories

== Bibliography ==
- Hacohen, Aviad (2008). Commitment and Complexity: Jewish Wisdom in an Age of Upheaval: Selections from the Writings of Rabbi Yehuda Amital. KTAV Publishing House. ISBN 978-1602800304.
- Inbari, Motti (2012). Messianic Religious Zionism Confronts Israeli Territorial Compromises. Cambridge University Press. ISBN 9781107009127.
- Jacobson, David C. (1997). Israeli Poetry and the Bible. Wayne State University Press. ISBN 978-0814326237.
- Lichtenstein, Aharon; Lior, Dov (1994). "A Rabbinic Exchange on Baruch Goldstein's Funeral". Tradition. Vol. 28. Rabbinical Council of America. pp. 59–63.
- Linnan, David K. (2008). Enemy Combatants, Terrorism, and Armed Conflict Law: A Guide to the Issues. Praeger Security International Series. ABC-CLIO. ISBN 978-0275998141.
- Oliver, Anne Marie; Steinberg, Paul F. (2005). The Road to Martyrs' Square: A Journey into the World of the Suicide Bomber. Oxford University Press. ISBN 978-0198027560.
- Rayner, John D. (1998). A Jewish Understanding of the World. Berghahn Books. ISBN 978-1571819741.
- Vitullo, Anita (1994). The massacre in al-Haram al-Ibrahimi al-Sharif. Palestine Human Rights Information Center.
- Waxman, Chaim I. (2012). "It's Not All Religious Fundamentalism". In Cohen, Richard I. (ed.). Visualizing and Exhibiting Jewish Space and History. Studies in Contemporary Jewry. Oxford University Press. ISBN 978-0199934249.
