= Retsef Levi =

Israeli mathematician and management scientist (born 1971)

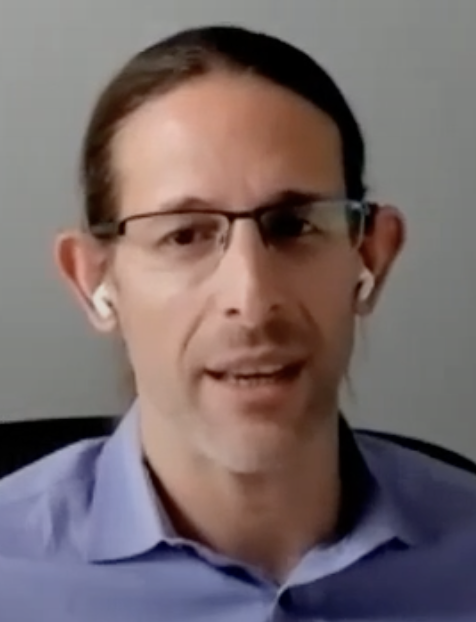
- Levi in 2021
- Born: March 7, 1971 (age 55); Tel Aviv, Israel
- Education: Tel Aviv University (BSc); Cornell University (PhD)
- Scientific career
- Fields: Applied mathematics; Operations research
- Workplaces: Massachusetts Institute of Technology
- Thesis: Computing Provably Near-Optimal Policies for Stochastic Inventory Control Models (2005)
- Doctoral advisor: David Shmoys; Robin Roundy
- Other academic advisors: James Renegar
- Military career
- Allegiance: Israel
- Branch: Israel Defense Forces; Intelligence Corps
- Service years: 1990–2001
- Rank: Rav séren (Major)

Retsef Levi (Hebrew: רצף לוי; born March 7, 1971) is an Israeli applied mathematician and management scientist. He is the J. Spencer Standish Professor of Operations Management at the Massachusetts Institute of Technology (MIT).

In June 2025, Robert F. Kennedy Jr., U.S. Secretary of Health and Human Services, appointed Levi as a member of the Advisory Committee on Immunization Practices (ACIP) at the Centers for Disease Control and Prevention (CDC).

== Early life and education ==
Levi was born on March 7, 1971, in Tel Aviv, Israel. He is a brother of Israeli screenwriter Reshef Levi and Israeli author Yannets Levi.

From 1990 to 2001, Levi served in the Israel Defense Forces (IDF). Beginning in 1991, he was an intelligence officer of the elite Israeli Intelligence Corps, first as a lieutenant intelligence analyst (1990–1992), then as a captain (1992–1994) and then major, or Rav séren (1994–1996).

While serving in the Israeli military, Levi graduated summa cum laude from Tel Aviv University in 2001 with a B.Sc. in mathematics. He then completed doctoral studies in the United States at Cornell University, where he earned his Ph.D. in operations research and mathematical programming in 2005 under professors Robin Roundy and David Shmoys. His dissertation was entitled "Computing Provably Near-Optimal Policies for Stochastic Inventory Control Models". Professors James Renegar and Shane Henderson also advised Levi's thesis.

== Career ==
After receiving his doctorate, Levi completed postdoctoral research at the IBM T.J. Watson Research Center, where he was the Goldstine Postdoctoral Fellow at the Department of Mathematical Sciences. He became an assistant professor of management in 2006 at the MIT Sloan School of Management, where he held a position as a Robert N. Noyce Career Development Professor. He was promoted to an associate professor with tenure in July 2009 and received the school's appointment as its J. Spencer Standish Professor of Operations Management in July 2010.

Levi was associate editor of the peer-reviewed academic journals Management Science (from 2009 to 2014), Mathematics of Operations Research (from 2009 to 2015), Naval Research Logistics (from 2009 to 2015), and Operations Research (from 2011 to 2018).

In 2021, Israeli minister of education Yoav Gallant appointed Levi to a panel of experts tasked with advising the government on the reopening of schools during the COVID-19 pandemic in Israel. Levi was a critic of the Israeli Ministry of Health's policy of closing schools during the pandemic, which he considered unnecessary.

=== Advisory Committee on Immunization Practices, 2025 ===
Levi is a critic of COVID-19 lockdowns and mRNA vaccines, and a COVID-19 vaccine skeptic. He has published papers on the mortality rates of COVID-19 vaccines. He wrote on Twitter in 2023 that “the evidence is mounting and indisputable that mRNA vaccines cause serious harm including death, especially among young people". On June 11, 2025, Robert F. Kennedy Jr., the U.S. Secretary of Health and Human Services, announced that he appointed Levi as one of the members of the Advisory Committee on Immunization Practices (ACIP). However, Levi did not have medical, epidemiological, or immunological training, experience, or background. Levi was removed from his position on the ACIP in 2026 when a ruling in American Academy of Pediatrics v. Kennedy invalidated the entire committee's appointments.

== Selected publications ==
- Sun, Christopher L. F.; Jaffe, Eli; Levi, Retsef (2022-04-28). "Increased emergency cardiovascular events among under-40 population in Israel during vaccine rollout and third COVID-19 wave". Scientific Reports. 12 (1): 6978. Bibcode:2022NatSR..12.6978S. doi:10.1038/s41598-022-10928-z. ISSN 2045-2322. PMC 9048615. PMID 35484304.
- Levi, Retsef; Schurr, Efrat (January 22, 2024). "Miscarriage after SARS-CoV-2 vaccination: A request to report more details of the regression models and analyses". International Journal of Gynecology & Obstetrics. 131 (9): 1322. doi:10.1111/1471-0528.17767. PMID 38247342.
- Levi, Retsef; Magnanti, Thomas; Shaposhnik, Yaron (2024-05-01). "Scheduling with Testing of Heterogeneous Jobs". Management Science. 70 (5): 2934–2953. doi:10.1287/mnsc.2023.4833. ISSN 0025-1909.
- Levi, Retsef; Mansuri, Fahad; Jordan, Melissa M.; Ladapo, Joseph A. (2025-04-29). "Twelve-Month All-Cause Mortality after Initial COVID-19 Vaccination with Pfizer-BioNTech or mRNA-1273 among Adults Living in Florida". medRxiv 10.1101/2025.04.25.25326460..
