= Carthago (Israeli TV series) =

- קרתגו
- Genre: Period drama
- Created by: Reshef Levi; Yannets Levi; Tomer Shani
- Directed by: Tomer Shani
- Starring: Uri Gov; Oleg Levin; Yaakov Zada-Daniel; Philip Glenister; Carolina Jurczak
- Music by: Tal Yardeni
- Country of origin: Israel
- Original language: Hebrew
- No. of seasons: 1
- No. of episodes: 11

Production
- Producer: Yoav Gross
- Editor: Itamar Goldwasser

Original release
- Network: Kan 11
- Release: 18 December 2022 – 17 January 2023

Carthago (Hebrew: קרתגו) is an Israeli period drama broadcast on Kan 11, created by brothers Reshef Levi and Yannets Levi with Tomer Shani, who also directed the series.

The subject of the series is the fictionalized story of Elijah Levi, the creators' father, who was deported from Palestine to a British internment camp in Carthago, Sudan.

== Plot ==
The series is set in 1942, in the midst of the British deportation of Zionist militias from Mandatory Palestine. Levi, a successful and innocent comedian, finds himself brought to the Carthago camp with a group of Lehi fighters, alongside other British detainees including Nazis and Italian fascists. Once there, he discovers that his former lover, Helena, is married to the camp commander, Lord Davidson.

== Awards ==
At the Canneseries festival in 2023, the show was the winner of the Special Interpretation Award for its cast as well as the High School Award for Best Series.

== Reception ==
Many family members of those imprisoned in Carthago criticized the lighthearted portrayal of the prisoners as well as the show's claim to be based on true events where in reality there were never women, Nazis, or fascists imprisoned in the camp. In response to the criticism, Kan, the show's broadcaster, added an opening slide noting that the events depicted were fictional in nature and any similarity to real people or events was purely coincidental.

The series also took other liberties with the historical facts: the actual prison camp was located in the desert, rather than the jungle; and while the show is set in 1942, the camp was in fact not opened until 1944.

In an interview, Yannets Levi defended the show's decisions as grounded in stories from his family's childhood, arguing that "to convey the human essence of the story, it is impossible to remain within the boundaries of the historical facts."
