= Ori Shochat =

Israeli record producer

Ori Shochat אורי שוחט
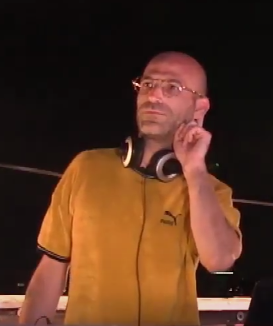

Background information
- Born: September 2, 1978 (age 47)
- Genres: Hip hop; trap
- Occupations: Record producer; DJ; rapper
- Years active: 1999-present

Ori Shochat (Hebrew: אורי שוחט; born 2 September 1978) is an Israeli record producer. Shochat is considered one of the most influential people in the Israeli hip hop scene.

== Early life ==
Shochat was born in Rosh Pinna. In his youth his family moved to Brussels for 2 years followed by a year in Detroit enabling his father's work. In the 1990s he was a part of "HaRevia HaPotahat" (Hebrew: הרביעייה הפותחת).

== Career ==
In 2010 Shochat released his first album Ochel Sratim (Hebrew: אוכל סרטים), which was recorded in 2005.

In 2012 he released his second album Always Ready, with a guest appearance by Israeli rapper Nechi Nech. In 2018 he released another album named Unicorn, with guest appearances by Michael Moshonov and Charlie Babz.

Together with Michael Cohen, he produced every album for the Israeli rapper Peled.

In 2019 he produced a collaboration album with the Israeli rapper, Noroz named Avud (Hebrew: אבוד).

In 2022 he produced a collaboration album with the Israeli artist Tohat "nissim"

In 2022 he released his first own producer album for the Israeli market "Shochatoda" which features guest appearances from Ravid Plotnik (FKA Nechi Nech), Tuna, Lukach, Peled, Teddy Neguse, Eden Derso, Michael Cohen, Michael Moshonov, Roy Kafri, Boi Ecchi and more.

Shochat began to serve as a record producer as a high school student and as a soldier in the Israeli Defence Force, especially for the Israeli rapper, Subliminal.

Shochat worked with many Israeli hip hop artists, including Tamer Nafar, Nechi Nech, Roy Kafri, Cohen@Mushon, Sagol 59 and Ron Nesher.

== Discography ==
=== Studio albums ===
Title	Year	Label
Ochel Sratim	2010	Self-release
Always Ready	2011	Soulspzam
Unicorn	2018	Soulspzam
Avud (with Noroz)	2019	Pil Ltd
Nissim (with Tohar)	2022	Yahalom/Helicon
Shochatoda	2022	Shigola/Helicon

=== EPs ===
Title	Year	Label
The Uuhh EP	2012	Soulspzam
Shotime	2013	Soulspzam
Problematic Textures	2016	Soulspzam

=== Singles ===
Title	Year	Label	Album
Brandon Walsh (with Lukach)	2011	Soulspzam	N/a
Trippin'	2011	Soulspzam	N/a
Shine and Cris	2011	Soulspzam	N/a
Whiners (featuring Cohen)	2011	Soulspzam	N/a
Never Fall (featuring Ravid Plotnik)	2012	Soulspzam	Always Read
That Kind of Girl	2013	Soulspzam	N/a
Bad	2013	Soulspzam	N/a
Jamaican	2013	Soulspzam	N/a
Moving	2013	Soulspzam	N/a
Spend the Night	2013	Soulspzam	N/a
Drink	2013	Soulspzam	Shotime
That Boom (with Dan Farber)	2013	Soulspzam	Shotime
Don't You Know (with Isaac DaBom)	2014	Soulspzam	N/a
Girl	2014	Soulspzam	N/a
Phone	2014	Soulspzam	N/a
In My Zone	2014	Soulspzam	N/a
Owls	2015	Soulspzam	N/a
Heal My Wings (featuring Ben Blackwell)	2015	Soulspzam	Problematic Textures
Imix	2015	Soulspzam	N/a
Bounce	2016	Soulspzam	N/a
Spells	2016	Soulspzam	N/a
Timtamz (featuring Charlie Babz and Mike Mushon)	2018	Soulspzam	Unicorn
Layla (with Noroz)	2019	Pil Ltd	Avud
Japan (with Peled & Sima Nun)	2022	Shigola/Helicon	Shochatoda
En Gedi (with Ravid Plotnik & Teddy Neguse & Vibe-Ish)	2022	Shigola/Helicon	Shochatoda

=== Guest appearances ===
Title	Year	Label	Album
LAX (Luqi featuring Noroz and Ori Shochat)	2017	Self-release	Milmulim
Kipod (Noroz & Luqi featuring Ori Shochat)	2017	Self-release	Noroz X Luqi
Bishvil Hamola (Eden Derso & DJ Mesh featuring Ori Shochat)	2018	Helicon • Shigola	Keter Shakuf
Everybody on My Kick (Guapo Fumado featuring Ori Shochat)	2019	Self-release	Hola Guapo, Vol. 1

=== Remixes ===
Title	Artist
Shir Ahave (Remix)	Sagol 59
Shir Hasachi (Ori Shochat Remix)	Lukach
Orot (Vibetown Remix)	Avraham Tal
Bom (Ori Shochat Remix)	Peled & Ortega
Nh26 (Ori Shochat Remix)	DJ Brace

== See also ==
- Israeli hip hop
- Music of Israel
