= Adi Himelbloy =

Israeli actress, model, and television host

Adi Himelbloy עדי הימלבלוי
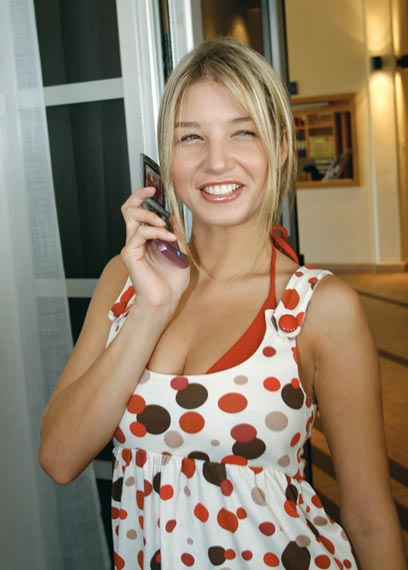
- Himelbloy in 2008
- Born: 27 November 1984 (age 41); Holon, Israel
- Spouse: Nadav Peled (m. 2014)
- Children: 2
- Modeling information
- Height: 1.70 m (5 ft 7 in)
- Hair color: Blonde
- Eye color: Green

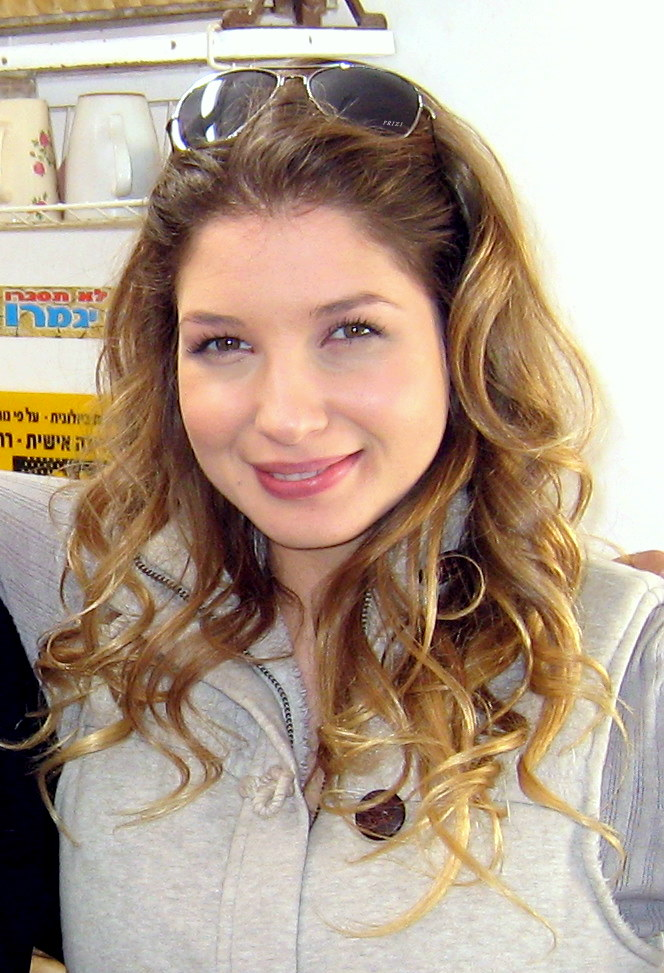
Himelbloy in 2008

Adi Himelbloy (also spelled Himmelbleu, Hebrew: עדי הימלבלוי; born 27 November 1984) is an Israeli actress, model, and television host.

== Early life ==
Himelbloy was born and raised in Holon, Israel, to Israeli-born parents. Her father Yigal Himelbloy's family was of German Jewish descent; and her mother Dolly (née Razon) hails from a family of Greek-Jewish descent. Himelbloy was first discovered on the Dudu Topaz's primetime entertainment show HaRishon BaBidur on Israel's Channel 2, when she won a modeling contest held as part of the show.

She was enlisted as a soldier to the Israel Defense Forces (IDF).

== Career ==
After the show, she worked in modeling for several years, until being approved as an actress for the Israeli television series HaShminiya (The Octette), in which she played the character Natasha Segovia, a young woman with an unusual talent for drawing. In 2006, Himelbloy participated in the Israeli drama series HaAlufa (האלופה, The Champion). Afterwards Himelbloy participated in the children's song contest Festigal 2006, where she performed along with other actors from HaShminiya such as Dawn Lanny-Gabay and Shira Vilensky. In addition, she also started appearing in TV advertisements. In 2007 she participated in Festigal once more and dubbed the character of April O'Neil in the Hebrew version of the animated film Teenage Mutant Ninja Turtles.

In 2009, Himelbloy participated in the Israeli musical Treasure Island (Hebrew: אי המטמון, I HaMatmon). She also played in the Israeli drama series The Double (הכפולה, HaKfula). On 29 June 2008 Himelbloy became a hostess at the Israeli Children's Channel. In November 2008, the Israeli sci-fi series Deus debuted on the Israeli Children's Channel, in which Himelbloy played the character Rona Merom. During the late 2000s, Himelbloy also modeled for the Israeli swimwear company Pilpel.

In 2009, Himelbloy participated in the Festigal for the third time and in 2010, she hosted a talk and game show called Chuba's Angels, alongside the actress Dawn Lanny-Gabay.

In 2010, she participated in Rokdim Im Kokhavim, the Israeli version of Strictly Come Dancing, coming in third place.

In 2026, she was cast in the second season of Save the Date, alongside Michael Aloni and Ran Danker.

== Personal life ==
She married Israeli restaurateur Nadav Peled in 2014. They have two sons.

== Filmography ==
- HaShminiya (2005–2007, 2013–2014)
- HaAlufa (2006–2007, 2009)
- Deus (2008–2011)
- Malabi Express (2013)
- Save the Date (2027)

== See also ==
- Israeli fashion
- Women of Israel
- Women in the Israel Defense Forces
- List of Israelis
- List of Jewish actors
