= Deus (TV series) =

Television series

- Genre: Detective fiction, Drama, Science fiction
- Created by: Danny Wasserman, Gidi Dar
- Written by: Danny Wasserman
- Directed by: Gidi Dar
- Starring: Michael Moshonov; Adi Himmelbleu; Michael Lewis; Ester Rada; Ayala Lifshitz; Itai Shor
- Country of origin: Israel
- Original language: Hebrew
- No. of seasons: 2
- No. of episodes: 98

Production
- Running time: 23 November 2008 - 10 March 2010

Original release
- Network: Arutz HaYeladim

Deus (Hebrew: דאוס, often pronounced in the show as "Deos" rather than "Deus") is an Israeli sci-fi thriller series centered on the world of hackers, computers, and the internet. The creators described Deus as a "1984 for kids." The show aired on the Arutz HaYeladim (The Kids' Channel). (on yes) from 2008 to 2010.

The series won the Israeli Television Academy Award for Best Children and Youth's Series in 2009 and 2010.

Following the end of the Kids Channel broadcasts on yes, the series was removed from the yes service but returned to the yes Kids Channel library.

== Background ==
Deus is an Internet bot with artificial intelligence, and has full control over the computer, the software was given free for all the people on a USB. The software has human feels and interacts with the PC user with a webcam. All of the software is controlled from one Deus in a secret room inside the high tech. The software starts to have a full control over the world and the Deus sees everything, the humans start a war versus the software.

== Characters ==
=== School ===
- Danny Heisner (Michael Moshonov): Hacker and gamer, the best friend of Tom.
- Adise Eklilo (Ester Rada): Outstanding student in mathematics, she is a hacker too.
- Idan Gavish (Michael Lewis): The king of the class, basketball player former, started to be gamer.
- Rona Rafaeli-Marom (Adi Himmelbleu): Outstanding student and the class queen.
- Tom Moyal (Itai Shor): Rapper, the best friend of Danny.
- Dafna Morag (Ayala Lifshitz): Blogger and gossip girl.

=== Haitzner Family ===
- Yoav Heisner (Yoav Hait): The father of Danny, works in high tech.
- Dor Alona Heisner (Sigalit Tamir): The mother of Danny, a Surgeon.

=== Police and Mosad ===
- Schneider (Neta Spiegelmann): A cop.
- Benny Zion (Kobi Mahat): A cop.
- Ze'evi (Idan Gil): Head detective of the police.
- Nimrod (Mickey Leon): Mossad agent (Fake, actually a criminal).

=== Other characters ===
- Dr. David Gold (Dror Keren): CEO of high - tech.
- Professor Werner (Tzahi Hanan): Scientist responsible for the development of Deus. Kidnapped.
- Barkan (Ori Klausner): Offender.
- Dr. Honig (Svetlena Demidov): Scientist responsible for the development of Deus.
