= Lost Islands (film) =

- Promotional release poster
- Directed by: Reshef Levi
- Written by: Reshef Levi
- Starring: Michael Moshonov, Oshri Cohen, Orly Silbersatz Banai
- Cinematography: Ofer Harari
- Music by: Assaf Amdursky
- Release date: 2008
- Running time: 103 minutes
- Country: Israel
- Language: Hebrew

Lost Islands (Hebrew: איים אבודים) is a 2008 Israeli comedy-drama film by the writer and director Reshef Levi. The film is named after the Australian television series The Lost Islands, which was broadcast in Israel's only channel, when the plot takes place. The film was nominated for 14 Ophir Awards, of which it won four. It was watched by 280000 people in Israel in the cinemas on 2008, making it the most viewed Israeli film that year.

The film takes place in the early eighties in Kfar Saba, and tells the story of the Levy family, focusing on twin sons who fall in love with the same girl.

According to Levi, the film is loosely based on personal experiences of his family, with its many children.

== Cast ==
- Michael Moshonov as Erez Levi
- Oshri Cohen as Ofer Levi
- Yuval Scharf as Neta
- Orly Silbersatz Banai as Sima Levi
- Ofer Shechter as Boaz
- Shmil Ben Ari as David Levi
- Yusuf Abu-Warda as a Lebanese villager

== Soundtrack ==
As a film taking place in the early eighties, its soundtrack consists of typical songs of that time.

- The Lost Islands theme song
- Abracadabra
- Love Boat Theme
- Aquarius
- Only You
- Don't You Want Me
- I Ran
- Forever Young
- Will You
- Moonlight Shadow
- Total Eclipse of the Heart
- Alone Again (Naturally)
- Come On Eileen
- I Want to Know What Love Is
- Mad World
- It Must be Love
