= United Nations Security Council Resolution 904 =

UN Security Council Resolution 904
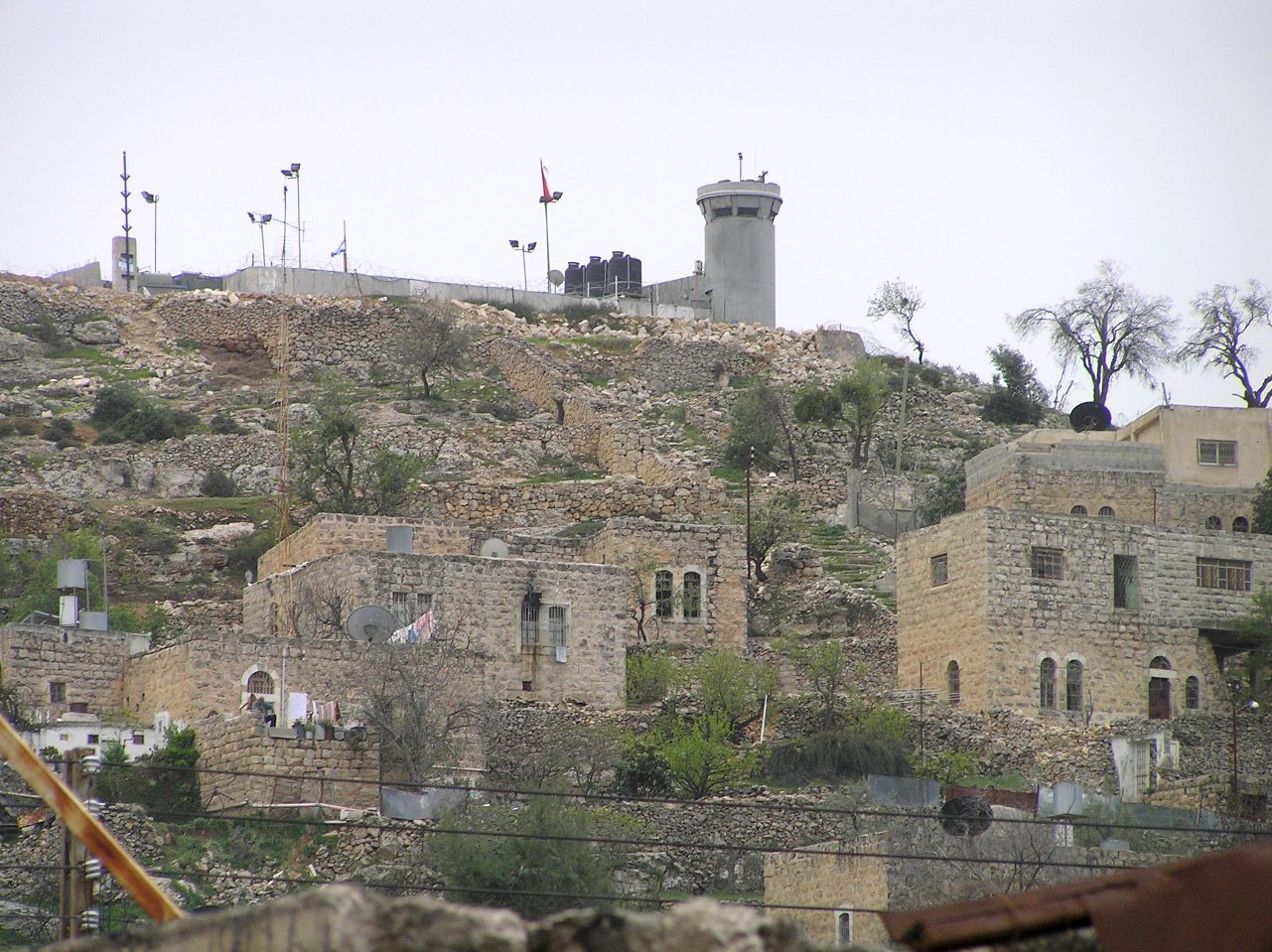
- Hebron
- Date: 18 March 1994
- Meeting no.: 3,351
- Code: S/RES/904 (Document)
- Subject: Territories occupied by Israel
- Result: Adopted

Security Council composition
- Permanent members: China; France; Russia; United Kingdom; United States
- Non-permanent members: Argentina; Brazil; Czech Republic; Djibouti; New Zealand; Nigeria; Oman; Pakistan; Rwanda; Spain

United Nations Security Council resolution 904 was adopted without a vote on 18 March 1994. After expressing its shock at the massacre committed against Palestinian worshippers in the Cave of the Patriarchs (Mosque of Ibrahim) in Hebron in the West Bank, the Council called for measures to be taken to guarantee the safety and protection of the Palestinian civilians throughout the occupied territory.

Concern was expressed at the Palestinian casualties in the occupied Palestinian territory as a result of the massacre, which took place during the Muslim month of Ramadan, which underlined the need to provide protection and security for the Palestinian people. The Council noted with satisfaction the efforts undertaken to guarantee the smooth proceeding of the peace process and the condemnation of the incident by the international community. It also reaffirmed the applicability of the Fourth Geneva Convention and the responsibilities of Israel.

The Council condemned the massacre in Hebron, which resulted in 30 fatalities (including the perpetrator) and 125 people injured, calling upon Israel to confiscate arms in order to prevent acts of violence by Israeli settlers. In calling for measures to be taken to protect Palestinian civilians, the Council requested the co-sponsors of the peace process, the United States and Russia, to continue to use their efforts in the peace process to bring about the implementation of the aforementioned provisions.

Finally, the resolution reaffirmed its support of the Declaration of Principles and urged its immediate implementation.

== See also ==
- Arab–Israeli conflict
- Israeli–Palestinian conflict
- List of United Nations Security Council Resolutions 901 to 1000 (1994–1995)
