= Rina Schenfeld =

Israeli choreographer and dancer (born 1938)

- רנה שיינפלד
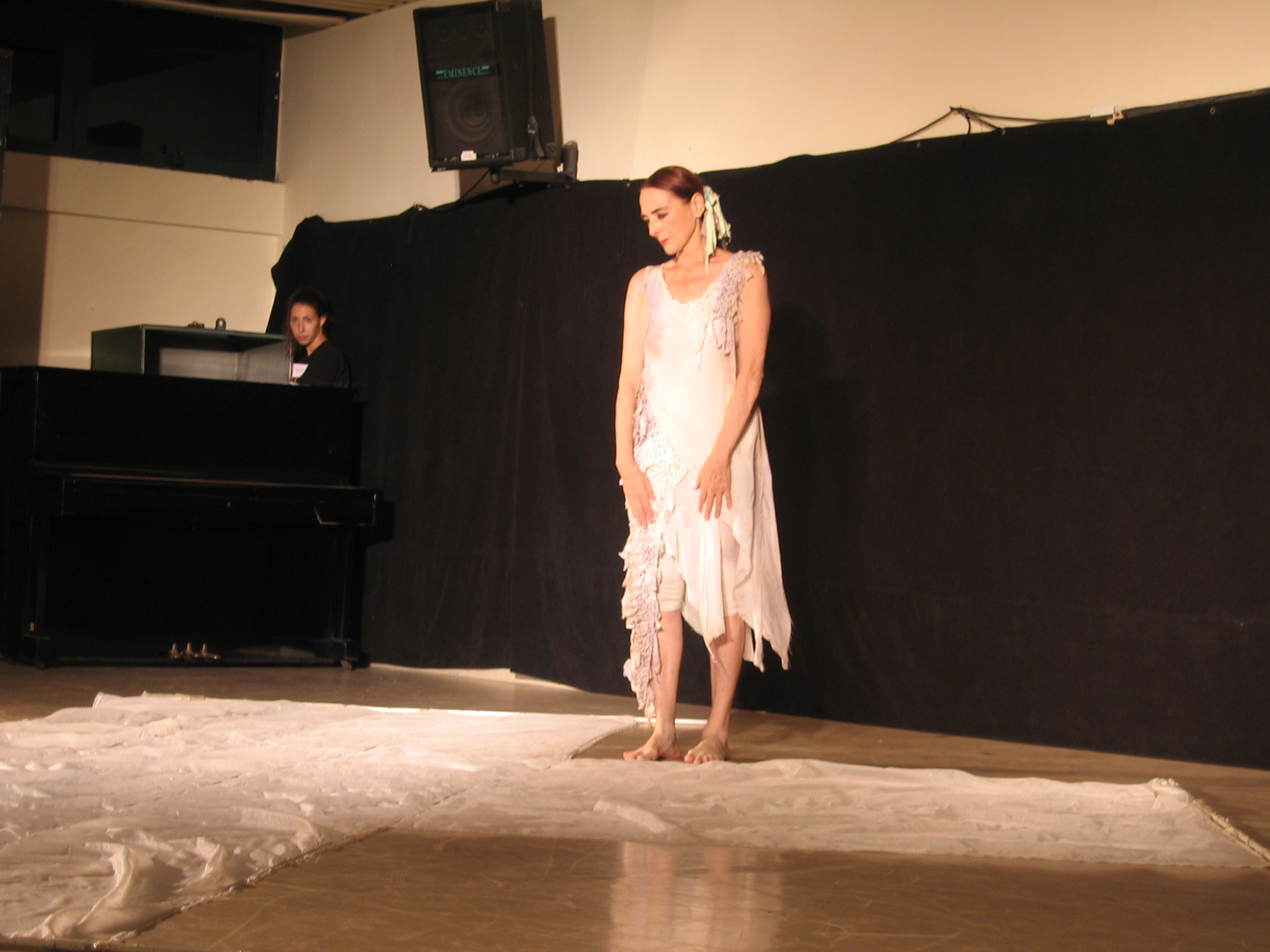
- Rina Schenfeld dancing at the Boydem Festival 2011
- Born: 1938 (age 87–88); Tel Aviv, British Mandate for Palestine
- Citizenship: Israeli
- Education: Juilliard School
- Occupations: Choreographer and dancer
- Known for: One of the leaders in creating an Israeli style in modern dance

Rina Schenfeld (Hebrew: רנה שיינפלד; born 1938) is an Israeli choreographer and dancer. As prima ballerina and choreographer of the Batsheva dance company, she was described by The New York Times as "one of the most important artists of our generation."

== Biography ==
Born in Tel Aviv in 1938, Schenfeld began studying classical ballet at the age of 12. After seeing a performance by the world-famous dancer Martha Graham, she switched to modern dance, later studying dance at the Juilliard School in New York. She danced in Israel with the Lyric Theater of Anna Sokolow, and in the United States, where she worked with Graham and other leading choreographers.

In 1964, Graham and Baroness Batsheva De Rothschild founded Batsheva, and chose Schenfeld as prima ballerina and choreographer. Schenfeld led the corps to worldwide fame, with works by renowned international choreographers as well as her own creations.

In 1978 Schenfeld left Batsheva to found the Rina Schenfeld Dance Theater. She taught a generation of Israeli dancers, and created an eclectic style that incorporated elements of dance theater, Bauhaus, modern and classical. One original element in her choreography is the use of physical objects in the dance. "Her use of objects guides the imagination to places beyond the dance," wrote a reviewer in Dance Life. "The objects lead to a unique experience and deepen the sense of motion."

== Key works ==
- La Sylphide (2011), a multimedia work that integrates video, poetry and electronic music with the dance.
- Dance to the end of love (2008), Schenfeld's first multimedia work, including also videoart and singing.
- Silk threads (1983), to music by Menachem Tsur and Steve Reich. Dancers incorporate streams of cloth, branches, and an aquarium.
- Cans and hair, sticks and balloons (1980). The dancer appears with a large tin on her head, and beats time on the tin as she dances.

== Awards ==
- In 2003 she was awarded The EMET Prize for Art, Science and Culture in the category of Culture and Art, for the field of Dance.

== See also ==
- Dance in Israel
