= On the Side of the Road =

- Film poster
- Directed by: Lia Tarachansky
- Produced by: Naretiv Productions
- Cinematography: Pierre Lempereur
- Edited by: Cathy Gulkin
- Music by: Rotem Moav
- Release date: 28 November 2013
- Running time: 83 minutes
- Country: Israel
- Languages: Hebrew; Arabic; English

On the Side of the Road is a 2013 Israeli documentary film written and directed by Lia Tarachansky. The film focuses on Israeli collective denial of the events of 1948 that led to the country's Independence and the Palestinian refugee problem. It follows war veterans Tikva Honig-Parnass and Amnon Noiman as they tackle their denial of their actions in the war. The film also tells the story of the director, Lia Tarachansky, an Israeli who grew up in a settlement in the West Bank but as an adult began to realize the problems of the Israeli Occupation for the Palestinians. The film was shot over the course of five years and premiered at the First International Independent Film Festival in Tel Aviv.

== Synopsis ==
Lia Tarachansky grew up in a settlement. When the Second Intifada broke out in 2000 her family moved to Canada. There, for the first time she met Palestinians and "discovered" their history and learned why they were fighting Israel in the first place.

When she became a journalist, she returned to Israel to become the local correspondent for The Real News network. Returning for the first time to her settlement, she "discovers" the Palestinians next door as she travels the West Bank covering the Israeli military occupation. In the film she meets with people who played a personal role in the events of 1948 and like her, "discovered" things that they had erased from their consciousness. For years she tries to convince veterans of the 1948 war who started the conflict as we know it today to face the most difficult questions and dig deep into their memories.

== Featuring ==
- Lia Tarachansky, an Israeli former settler
- Eitan Bronstein, Director of the Israeli organization Zochrot
- Khalil Abu Hamdeh, a Palestinian descendant of 1948 refugees
- Amnon Noiman, an Israeli veteran of the 1948 war
- Tikva Honig-Parnass, an Israeli veteran of the 1948 war

== Production ==
The film was shot over a period of five years. It was originally titled "Seven Deadly Myths" and was conceived as a journalistic film featuring the New Historians. Following a personal transformation, director Tarachansky decided to focus the film on the personal stories of Israeli veterans and as a result the film changed in content and title.

== Release ==
On the Side of the Road premiered at the First International Festival on Nakba and Return, which took place at Cinematheque Tel Aviv. The film premiered in the West Bank city of Ramallah in March, at the Franco-German Cultural Center in March 2014. The film was later featured at the Eye on Palestine film festival in Ghent, Belgium and at the Nakba Film Festival in Australia.

=== Awards ===
In June 2014 the film received Honorable Mention at the International Independent Film Awards in California.

== Taboo ==
According to the film's director, the mass displacement of Palestinians in 1948 remains a taboo in Israeli society. In an interview with Frank Barat she said "The strongest element of Israeli DNA is knowing what questions you cannot ask". Controversy arose at the festival at which On the Side of the Road premiered when Israeli Parliamentarian Ayelet Shaked argued that state subsidy of cultural events referring to the events of 1948 as the "Nakba" is in violation of the 2011 Nakba Law.
