= The A.R.K. Report =

The A.R.K. Report – Secret for the Century
- Directed by: Shmuel Hoffman
- Written by: Asher Crispe; Harry Moskoff; Layla O'Shea
- Produced by: Harry Moskoff
- Starring: Katy Castaldi; Pascal Yen-Pfister; Ayden Crispe
- Cinematography: Shmuel Hoffman
- Edited by: Asher Cryspe
- Music by: Infected Mushrooms; Tilo Schmalenberg; Ween
- Production companies: Moskoff-Media; Hoffman Productions
- Distributed by: Moskoff Media, Ltd.
- Release dates: January 1, 2013 (limited); May 7, 2013 (Monaco Charity Film Festival)
- Running time: 32 minutes
- Countries: Israel; United States
- Language: English

The A.R.K. Report – Secret for the Century is a 2013 action-adventure science fiction short film and television pilot produced by Canadian-Israeli research professor, Harry Moskoff and directed by Shmuel Hoffman. The lead actress is Katy Castaldi who plays Karmi. The lead actor is Pascal Yen-Pfister who plays Roth.

== Plot ==
The film takes place in a dystopian future, and follows a young woman (Karmi) who stumbles across her personal destiny as the only one who can find the ancient Ark of the Covenant and keep it out of the hands of those that want to use it for evil. The opening and closing documentary-style segments comprise a unique cinematic feature intended to synthesize real-life threats within the fictitious storyline. All scenes that are depicted in the future are filmed in black and white while scenes which take place in the present are shown in color.

The film begins with Karmi being approached by Roth, a special agent for a secret government agency that is seeking to discover the location of the ancient Ark of the Covenant in order to use it to battle the evil Naarym children's army. Roth, running from Teemah, lead operative of the child army, brings Karmi with him on a secret quest to return the fabled ARK to its proper place, both literally and figuratively, i.e. to find the ARK within one's self. Karmi is one of the few remaining Nehoks who can return the Ark to its proper location on the hidden mountain. If the Ark is to fall into the hands of Teemah (played by supporting actress, Ayden Crispe) and her evil children's army, it would spell doom for mankind. Led by her mysterious mentor, Karmi confronts herself as she climbs the 4 levels of Earth, Wind, Fire, etc. Ultimately, Roth transports Karmi into the future where she is successful in locating the Ark. But then the agents of the Naarym army seize the Ark to use it for their diabolical purposes.

With no alternative, Roth is forced to return Karmi to the previous era. But he gives her a mission. On her own, using the ancient code book ('The ARK Report') entrusted to her by Roth, she must locate the Ark and return it to its proper place. Once there, the Ark is portrayed as being the catalyst that will ultimately harbor in a new era of peace and prosperity for all of humanity.

== Background ==
The film is based on extensive research of Moskoff to discover the location of the Ark of the Covenant. He is convinced that the Ark is buried underneath the Temple Mount in Jerusalem but is not under the Dome of the Rock, as is commonly conjectured. Moskoff also discounts other hypotheses that suggest that the Ark is in the Vatican or Ethiopia. Moskoff's thesis is following that of the 12th century Jewish codifier, Maimonides and substantiated by the British engineer and archaeologist, Sir Charles Warren, amongst others. In 2010, Moskoff produced a short documentary based on his research, entitled The Soul of Mount Moriah.

== Development ==
The A.R.K. Report was filmed in October 2012 in the Old City of Jerusalem as well as in Allentown in Pennsylvania. It contains some similarity to the 1981 Steven Spielberg movie, Raiders of the Lost Ark.

== Accolades ==
The A.R.K. Report film won the Gold Remi Award at the prestigious Worldfest International Film Festival in Houston Texas in April 2013. It was also selected for the Monaco International Film Festival during the second week of May 2013 in Monaco.
