= Michael Moshonov =

Israeli musical artist and actor (born 1968)

- מיכאל מושונוב
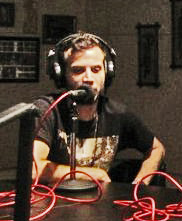
- Born: March 3, 1986 (age 40); Tel Aviv, Israel
- Other names: Mike Mushon; Mushon
- Occupations: Actor; rapper; director; musician; TV host
- Awards: Ophir Award; 2008 Lost Islands; Ophir Award; 2011 The Flood
- Musical career
- Genre: Hip hop
- Years active: 2008–present

Michael Moshonov (Hebrew: מיכאל מושונוב; born March 3, 1986) is an Israeli actor, rapper, musician and TV host. Moshonov won the Ophir Award for Best Actor twice, for Lost Islands and for The Human Resources Manager. He is also known professionally as Mike Mushon.

== Life and career ==
Moshonov was born in Tel Aviv, Israel, to actors Moni Moshonov and Sandra Sade. His father is of Bulgarian-Jewish descent, and a his mother is a Romanian-born Jew. He is the brother of opera singer Alma Moshonov. Moshonov's first appearance on television was in 1990 at the age of four, when he participated in the Israeli children show Mesibat Gan. In 1991, at the age of five, Moshonov acted, along with his father, in the Israeli children's film Kemo Gdolim along with Arik Einstein. In 1992 at the age of six, Moshonov participated along with his father and sister in the successful Israeli comedy film Kvalim. In 2001 at age 15 he played in the film Late Marriage alongside his father.

Moshonov studied at the Yoram Loewenstein Performing Arts Studio in Tel Aviv and in 2004 he played in the Israeli film Itzik. In 2005 Moshonov became a host of the Israeli youth TV show Exit (אקזיט) alongside Ofer Shechter, Shiri Maimon and others.

Through the years Moshonov played in stage productions, films and many television series, including the Israeli drama series "Parashat Ha-Shavua" and the Israeli film Dead End. In addition, he played in Orna Porat stage production "Colors in the sand" (צבעים בחול), which is based on the life story of the Israeli painter Nahum Gutman.

In 2006, Moshonov played the title role in Raphael Nadjari's film Tehilim, which was also nominated for the Palme d'Or prize in the 2007 Cannes Film Festival.

In 2007, Moshonov played in Reshef Levi's film Lost Islands. For his performance in this film Moshonov was awarded an Ophir Award in the "Best Actor" category.

In 2008, Moshonov received a leading role in the Israeli Sci-Fi TV series Deus. That same year he played the movie "Lebanon", directed by Samuel Maoz.

In 2010, he played in Guy Nattiv's movie Mabul (also known as The Flood). For his performance in this film Moshonov was awarded an Ophir Award in the "Best Supporting Actor" category.

In 2018, Moshonov appeared as Matthew the Apostle in Helen Edmundson's film Mary Magdalene.

Moshonov is also a member of the Israeli hip-hop group "Cohen@Mushon" (כהן@מושון), in which he performs along with his friend Michael Cohen.

=== Garden City Movement - Move On (Music Video) ===
On March 24, 2014 the first music video that Moshonov directed with Lael Utnik, Mayan Toledano and edited by Gal Muggia was released on Stereogum. The music video was selected for Los Angeles Film Festival.

== Filmography ==
Year	Film	Role	Notes
1997	Ha-Miklachat	?	Short film
2001	Late Marriage	?	Feature film
2001	Zanav Shel Afifon	Guy	TV movie
2006–2009	Parashat Ha-Shavua	Asaf Na'wy	TV series
2007	Tehilim	Menachem	Feature film
2008	Restless	Michael	Feature film
2008	For My Father	Shlomi	Feature film
2008	Lost Islands	Erez Levi	Feature film
2008	Discharged	Nessi	Short film
2008	Deus	Dani	TV series
2009	Private Rooms	Eddie	Short film
2009	Lebanon	Yigal	Feature film
2009	Bena	Yurik	Feature film
2010	Nauseated	Ami	Short film
2011	Mabul	Tomer Roshko	Feature film
2011	Ha-shoter	?	Feature film
2011	Chatulim Al Sirat Pedalim	Noam	Feature film (completed)
2011	Trail People	Ben	Short film (completed)
2011	Home Front	?	Short film (completed)
2012	Kathmandu	Shmulik	TV series
2014	Yona		
2018	Mary Magdalene	Matthew	Feature film
2018	The Little Drummer Girl	Litvak	TV Miniseries
2022	America	Eli	Feature film

== Discography ==
=== Cohen@Mushon ===
==== Studio albums ====
Title	Year	Label
Kosher Gufani	2008	Hed Arzi
Machshev Lekol Yeled	2011	Hi Fidelity
Yamim Arukim	2016	Unicell

==== Mixtapes ====
Title	Year	Label
Chroimal’e MeKohav Moshe	2011	Vibetown
Havai Ve'Bidur (with DJ Mesh)	2016	Shigola

== Music videos ==
- "Move On", Garden City Movement (2014)
