= Palestinian Child Arts Center =

Palestinian non-governmental non-profit

The Palestinian Child Arts Center (PCAC; Arabic: مركز فنون الطفل الفلسطيني) is a non-governmental, non-profit organization founded in 1994 in Hebron, Palestine. Its activities primarily involve the intellectual development of Palestinian children, and to reinforce a positive role for the child within Palestinian society and culture.

The violent context within which the children have been raised has affected their behavior and life. After the Mosque of Abraham massacre in February 1994 some children were traumatized and exhibited drastic behavioral changes. The programs run by PCAC are designed to gradually allow a child to resume normal life. The center's mission is to fulfill the promise in its slogan, Towards a creative Palestinian child.

== Objectives ==
The Palestinian Child Arts Center conducts various activities:

- preparation of educational programs for children
- modernizing and updating childhood development programs for professionals
- development of other programs for children in conjunction with other organizations to create a communal educational culture
- conduct research on the violation of the rights of children, and publish bulletins and reports to defend those rights
- to coordinate and cooperate with other organizations that focus on children
- develop relationships with other Arab and international organizations whose focus is children and their rights

== Programs ==
The centre offers numerous activities and services for both children and adults.

Children's programs:

- annual Amal Al Ghad (Hope of Tomorrow), a program targeting children ages 6–12
- library
- arts and crafts lessons
- music courses
- young leaders program, for teens ages 14–18 <-- or possibly teenage boys only? -->
- puppet theater
- electronic games
- festivals
- exhibitions

Adult programs:

- leader's recruiting
- public education - seminars, lectures, conferences and exhibits related to children
- qualifying kindergarten teachers
- qualifying advisors for summer camps
