= Tikva Honig-Parnass =

Israeli anti-Zionist activist

Tikvah Honig-Parnass on a visit to Kew Gardens, London, c 2000

Tikva Honig-Parnass (Hebrew: תקוה הוניג-פרנס, 1929-2025) was an Israeli anti-Zionist activist.

Honig-Parnass grew up in a secular Zionist milieu in Mandate Palestine, reading Marx and Rosa Luxemburg as a teenager. During the 1948 Palestine war she served in the Haganah and then the Palmach, where she served in the Harel Brigade. By her account, Honig-Parnass saw depopulated Palestinian villages (such as Qalunya) during the 1948 war. In retrospect she describes herself as having been "brainwashed" by her Zionist education: “The position we internalised pretended that we were not dealing with the development of a military force that was waiting for an opportune time to realise the Zionist plan for the conquest of the land and the dispossession of its Palestinian inhabitants, but rather a ‘revolutionary army’ of the oppressed.”

A Marxist since adolescence, Honig-Parnass worked as the Knesset secretary for Mapam in 1954-55.

Honig-Parnass came to view Zionism as a colonial enterprise in the early 1960s, through her involvement with Matzpen.

In the 1970s and 1980s she was involved with various Israeli left-wing groups, including the Bir Zeit University Solidarity Committee and Dai la Kibush (End the Occupation). In 1987 she joined the Alternative Information Center, whose English-language publication, News from Within, she edited for 13 years. Over the course of the 1990s Honig-Parnass grew increasingly critical of the AIC's political line, and she was fired in 2000. With a former colleague, Toufic Haddad, she founded a new English-language journal, Between the Lines, which shut down in 2003 due to lack of funding. In 2007 Haymarket Books published a selection of articles from Between the Lines, including contributions from Marwan Barghouti, Azmi Bishara, Ilan Pappé and others.

In 2011 Honig-Parnass published another book with Haymarket, False Prophets of Peace: Liberal Zionism and the Struggle for Palestine.

Honig-Parnass appeared in the 2013 documentary On the Side of the Road, where she discusses her experiences in the 1948 war.

Honig-Parnass was a supporter of the Boycott, Divestment and Sanctions movement.
