= Michael Cohen (Israeli musician) =

Israeli musical artist (born 1986)

Michael Cohen מיכאל כהן
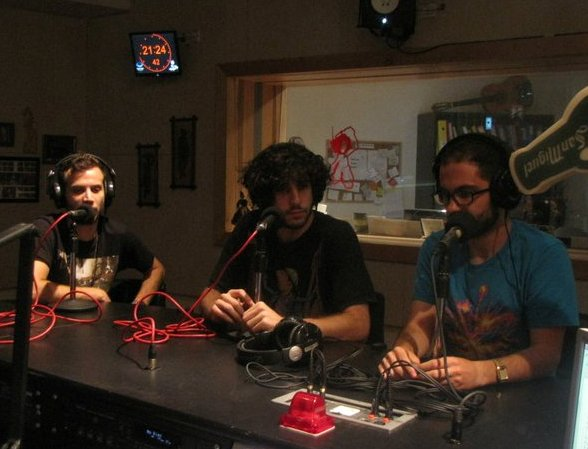

Background information
- Also known as: Cohen Beats; Cohanov; Mentos
- Born: October 5, 1986 (age 40)
- Genre: Hip hop
- Occupations: Rapper; record producer; DJ
- Years active: 2008–present
- Labels: Shigola; Helicon

Michael Cohen (Hebrew: מיכאל כהן; born October 5, 1986), known by his stage name Cohen (Hebrew: כהן) or by his producer name Cohen Beats (stylized as CohenBeats or Cohenbeats), he was half of the duo Cohen@Mushon beside Michael Moshonov.

== Biography ==
Born in Israel, the son of film director Avi Cohen and actress Meirav Gary, the grandson of Pnina Gary and half-brother via the father of the TV editor Muli Segev. Michael Cohen began his musical career in collaboration with Michael Moshonov; the two founded the musical duo Cohen@Mushon, and after they produced music videos for their songs they signed to the record label Hed Arzi. In 2008 Hed Artzi released "Kosher Gufani" (Hebrew: כושר גופני), the debut album of Cohen@Mushon. After 3 years they released their second album "Machshev Lekol Yeled" (Hebrew: מחשב לכל ילד).

After the release of the second album Cohen flew to United States, first living in New York and then in Los Angeles. There, he performed under the name Cohen Beats (stylized as CohenBeats) mainly as record producer and DJ.

== Discography ==
=== Studio albums ===
Title	Year	Label
Kosher Gufani (Cohen@Mushon)	2008	Hed Arzi
Machshev Lekol Yeled (Cohen@Mushon)	2011	Hi Fidelity
Serenadot FM (with Ayatola)	2016	Shigola
Yamim Arukim (Cohen@Mushon)	2016	Unicell
Daily Affirmations (as CohenBeats)	2017	Stonesthrow
Lingua Franca (as CohenBeats with Oliver the 2nd)	2020	TBA
Ma She’Efshar Im Ma She’Nishar	2021	Shigola
Habaita	2024	Shigola
