= Yannets Levi =

Israeli author, playwright, TV host and lecturer

- ינץ לוי
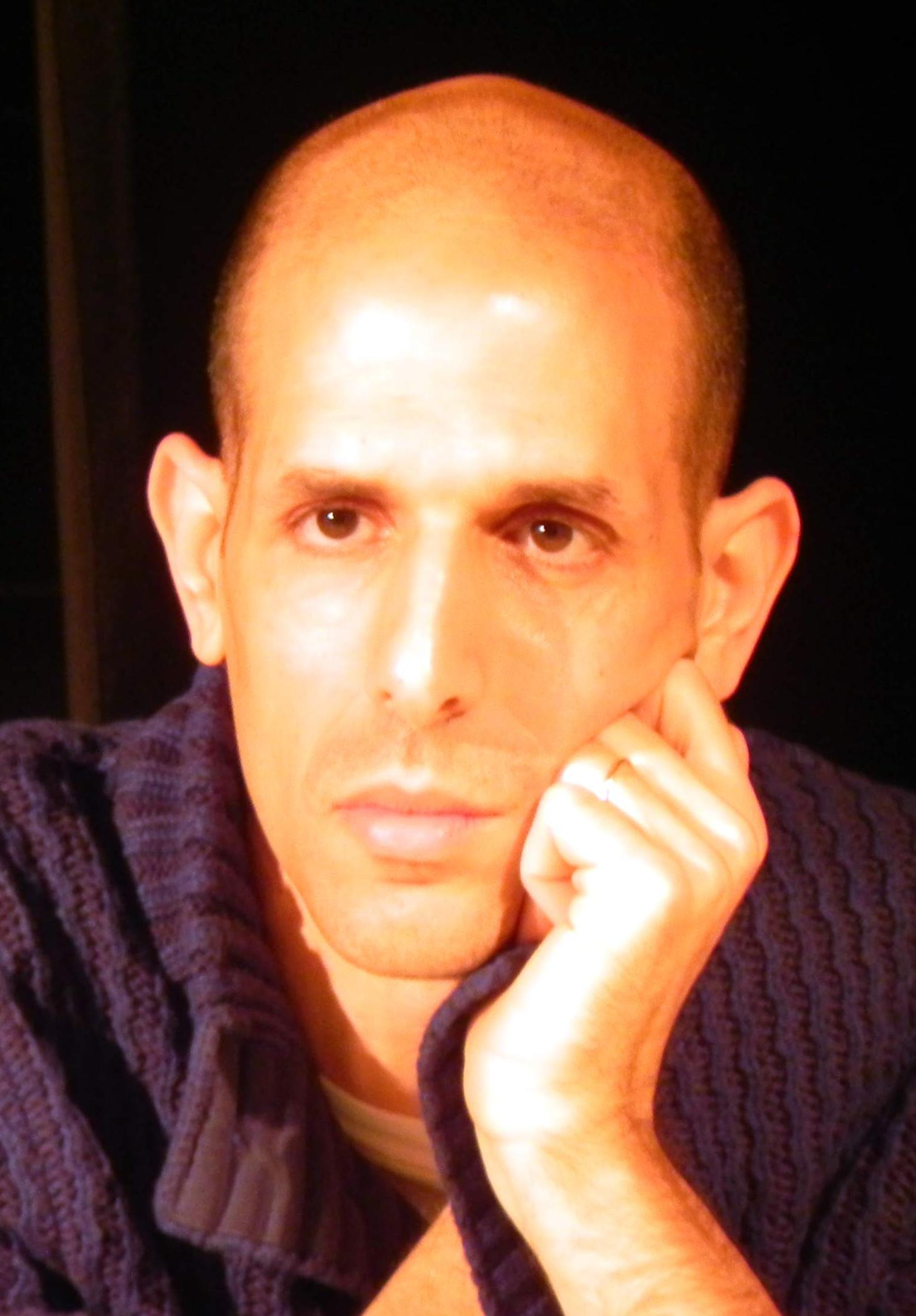
- Yanetz Levi, 2014
- Born: Amos Barber; 14 June 1975
- Occupation: Writer

Yannets Levi (Hebrew: ינץ לוי; born 14 June 1975) is an Israeli author, playwright, TV host and lecturer. Levi is one of Israel's most popular and acclaimed writers for children and adults with 12 best sellers published in a row. Books by Levi have been translated into English, Japanese, Korean, Chinese, Czech, Arabic, Hungarian, Macedonian, and Polish. In 2010 Levi won the Public Library Award, the most prestigious prize for children's literature in Israel. In 2016 he won the Dvora Omer Award for children's literature. In 2021, Levi won the Prime Minister's Prize for Hebrew Literary Works.

== Personal life ==
Levi was born in Herzliya, Israel, to a family of story-tellers in 1975 and grew up in Kfar Saba. His father was a journalist, and his mother had been an orthodox Jew, who'd become secular. Levi says that his writing was initially influenced by stories his father and other family relatives used to tell him when he was a child.

His first passionate interest was painting and even as a young child he felt destined to become a painter. But as a teenager he began writing and since then he has explored a variety of media: fiction and non-fiction, drama for TV and stage, journalism etc. He studied at Tel Aviv University in a program for outstanding students. Levi lost his brother, Regev Levi, who died of AIDS. Israeli writer and film director Reshef Levi is their brother. Yannets Levi is married to Israeli choreographer and dancer Inbal Oshman. They have 4 children.

Levi is a frequent visitor to India, studied its culture and used to lecture about Indian culture.

== Literature ==
Uncle Leo's Adventures (Hebrew: הרפתקאות דוד אריה) by Yannets Levi is one of Israel's most popular book series for children. The sixth book of the series was published May 2014. The series is published in Arabic, Czech, Korean, English (India, Pakistan, Nepal, Bangladesh and Bhutan), Japanese, Chinese, Hungarian and Macedonian. In China the series is received with great enthusiasm and success. Uncle Leo's Adventures' chapter reader books are part of the official curriculum of the Israeli ministry of education. The first book won the Public Library Award, 2010, the most prestigious prize for children's literature in Israel. It also won an award for its illustration (by Yaniv Shimony) from the Museum of Israel. The 3rd book of the series won the Devora Omer's award for the most popular children's or youth book in the public libraries. An Uncle Leo's Adventures' reading play in Arabic, based on the 1st book in the series premiered in January 2016 in the Elmina Theater (Jaffa) that promotes tolerance and co-existence in Israel. Uncle Leo's Adventures with Ragepunch the Witch, an original Uncle Leo's Adventures' Hebrew play for stage, written by Levi, premiered in December 2017 in Habima, Israel's national theater.

Levi's best-selling book, Tales of the Forest Man (2010, illustrated by Liora Grossman), is a collection of 9 retold fables about plants accompanied by botanical information.

Levi's best-selling novel for children titled Mrs. Rosebud is Not a Monster, portraying school days' adventures, was published in 2014. It tells the story of Michael, an excellent, obedient nonetheless frightened school pupil, who tends to cry a lot. During summer vacation he promises himself that next year he'll be braver and less anxious, but then he discovers his teacher is the most monstrous teacher since the dinosaur's era. Unfortunately, Michael falls in love with Daphne, without knowing she is Mrs. Rosebud's daughter.

Levi's best-selling and critically acclaimed novel for adults, Living Hope (Hebrew: תוחלת החיים של אהבה), was published in August 2015. It tells the story of a family with 6 siblings who discovers one day that their brother is HIV positive. The novel deals with the way each family member copes with the new situation and how it influences their lives and relationships.

The best-selling and critically acclaimed chapter reader book series When Grandpa Jonah was just a Kid by Levi started to be published December 2017. It is based on Levi's Father's childhood. It tells about Jonah, a very poor kid in the 1930s. The first book in the series is recommended by Israel's Ministry of Education as part of the Book Parade project. The second book "When Grandpa Jonah was Just a Kid – When It Rains, It Pours" was published in May 2019. In each book of the series the resourceful Jonah manages to help his poor family. He does that in an original, creative and very smart manner. The 3rd book in the series will be published in 2021. Princess Felicity and the Emotions' Factory by Levi (illustrated by Avi Blyer) was published in July 2020 to praising reviews. It's a science fiction tale about a kingdom where all emotions are vacuumed out of all the citizens. The protagonist Princess Felicity supports the act at first, but then realizes she must save her kingdom and recover all the missing emotions. The story deals with the significance of emotions in our lives, whether they're "positive" or "negative". The story also looks into commercialization and capitalism. In an interview on the book to Yediot Aharonot Levi said he's planning to adapt the story into a musical version for a narrator and an orchestra.

Levi published two other books for adults to a critical acclaim: Subterranean Water Stories and Himalaya Flesh and Blood.

== Theater ==
In December 2017 the play "Uncle Leo's Adventures with Ragepunch the Witch" by Levi premiered in Habima, Israel's national Theatre.

In February 2016 a play in Arabic, based on the first book of Uncle Leo's Adventures book series, premiered in Elmina – Multicultural Theater for Children and Youth, Jaffa, Israel. Directed by Norman Issa, the play, titled "Amu Osama" (Uncle Leo), was written by Levi who knows Arabic. Levi said that the play is "a dream come true. In such crazy days, when hatred and segregation dominate our lives, I'm glad there's an Uncle Leo play in Arabic that makes children laugh. This laughter is the sound of sanity."

Since 2014 an Uncle Leo's Adventures' reading play produce by LiStOVáNí Theatre is on tour in the Czech Republic. It was directed and performed by Lukáš Hejlík and Alan Novotný.

In March 2019 Yannets Levi's Adventures, a musical comedy show created and performed by Levi, premiered in Israel. In this show Levi is joined by actor Ben Perry. Levi meets on stage the main popular characters from his children's books with whom he interacts and sings songs.

== Television ==
Levi hosts a talk show on Channel 2 and the Israeli Educational Television. Based upon his talks with pupils, in this show, he discusses children's and Middle Grade literature with young readers.

Together with Reshef Levi (his brother) and Tomer Shani Levi is co-creator and co-writer of Carthago, a TV series that tells about a British detention camp in East Africa in 1940s. It's a mostly English speaking international co-production that will be broadcast on Kan11 channel of the Israeli Public Broadcasting Corporation.

As a script writer he wrote for a variety of drama and documentary TV series in Israel.

== Published works ==
- Subterranean Water Stories (Hebrew: סיפורים מי תהום), short stories collection.
- Himalaya Flesh and Blood (Hebrew: הימאליה בשר ודם), a novel.
- Uncle Leo's Adventures in the Romanian Steppes, a children's book – published in English, Japanese, Chinese, Czech, Korean and Arabic.
- Uncle Leo's Adventures in the Siberian Jungle, a children's book – published in English, Chinese, Czech and Korean.
- Uncle Leo's Adventures in the Swiss Desert, a children's book – published in English, Chinese, Czech and Korean.
- Tales of the Forest Man, a children's book.
- Uncle Leo's Adventures in the West Pole, a children's book – published in English, Chinese, Czech and Korean.
- Uncle Leo's Adventures in the Sahara Forests, a children's book – published in English, Chinese and Korean.
- Mrs. Rosebud is No Monster, a middle grade novel.
- Uncle Leo's Adventures in the Tibetan Ocean, a children's book.
- Living Hope (Hebrew: תוחלת החיים של אהבה), a novel.
- When Grandpa Jonah was Just a Kid (Hebrew: כשסבא אליהו היה קטן), a children's book.
- When Grandpa Jonah was Just a Kid 2 – When It Rain, It Pours" (Hebrew: כשסבא אליהו היה קטן – מבול של צרות), a children's book.
