= Reshef Levi =

Israeli comedian

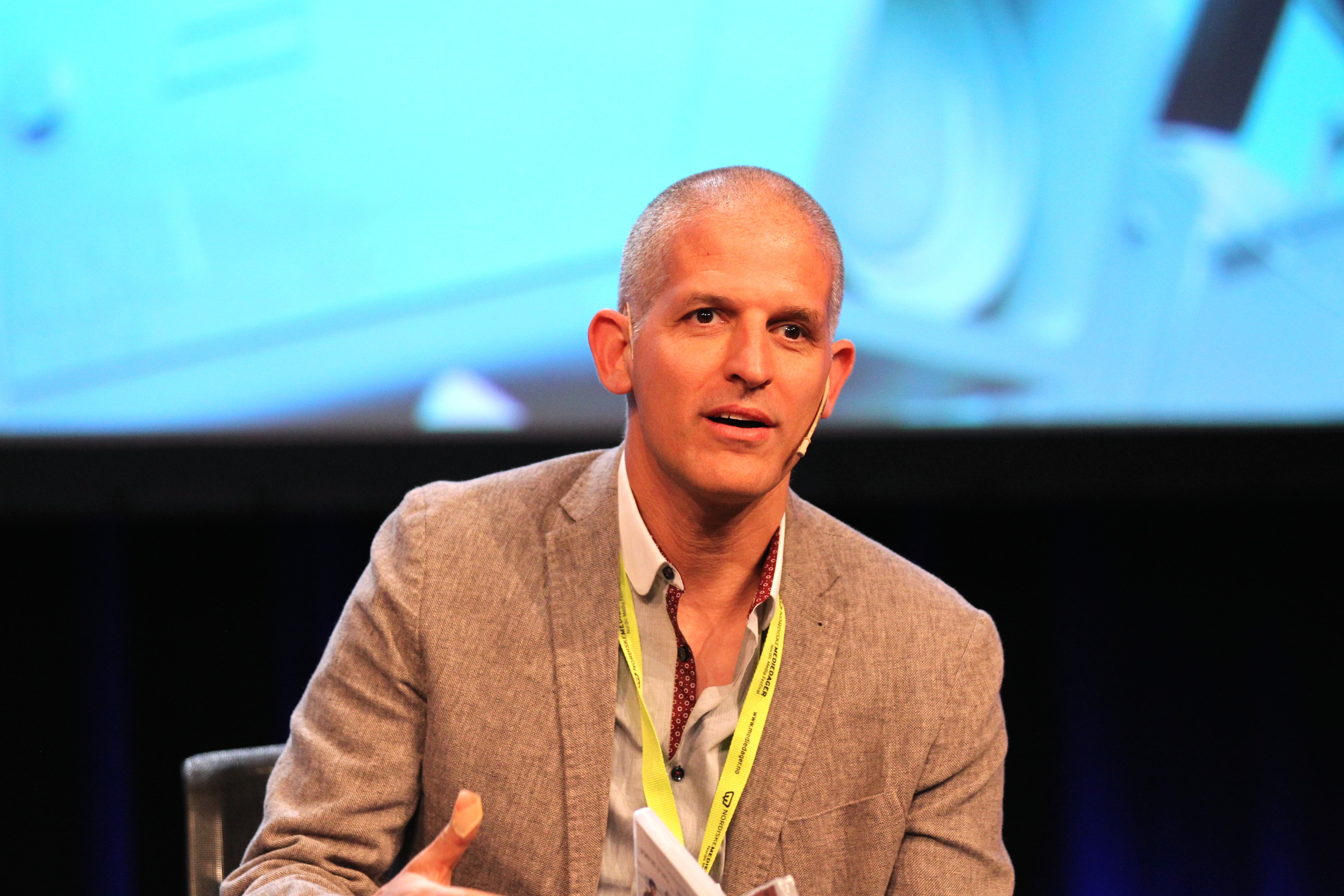
Reshef Levi, 2014

Reshef Levi (Hebrew: רשף לוי; born 13 March 1972) is an Israeli screenwriter, playwright, film director, producer, writer, comedian and television presenter. Winner of the Israeli Theatre Award and the Israeli Academy of Television Award. Levi is married with seven children and lives in Kfar Saba.

Reshef Levi is known for his successful debut feature film “Lost Islands”, which was nominated for 14 Ophir Awards by the Israeli Academy of Film and Television for outstanding cinematic work. In addition, Reshef Levi is a writer of one of the most popular television crime drama shows in Israel, “The Arbitrator” (Ha Borer). His last comedy film, “Hunting Elephants”, was made with the participation of Patrick Stewart.

== Early life ==
Levi was born in Israel to a family of eight, and he is of both Mizrahi Jewish (Yemenite-Jewish) and Ashkenazi Jewish (Polish-Jewish) descent. His father was a journalist of Yemeni origin and a veteran of the Lehi underground, and his mother a former Ultra-Orthodox Jew.

In the Israel Defense Forces, Reshef Levi served in the special reconnaissance unit Maglan. After his military service, he studied at the Adi Lautman Interdisciplinary Program for Outstanding Students of Tel Aviv University. After his brother Regev, who studied at the same programme, died of AIDS, Reshef began to add his late brother's name to each of his writing works, and signed under the pen name "Reshef and Regev Levi" (רשף ורגב לוי, pronounced REshef veREgev LEvi) as a personal commemoration. Levi is also the brother of Israeli writer Yannets Levi and Retsef Levi, the Co-Director of Leaders for Global Operations Program in MIT (Massachusetts Institute of Technology) management school.

== Career ==
In 1994, Reshef Levi began to write scenarios for comedian entertainment programs on television, while he still was in the army. His first works included comic shows like “Zehu Ze”, “Shemesh”, “Zahal 1” which described the army’s radio station, and “Halomot Behakizis”. In 2003, Reshef Levi wrote a scenario for “Hadmaot Shel Amsalem” (Tears of Amsalem), which described the life of a mobster whose father had to enter a nursing home, but caused troubles there.

“Hadmaot Shel Amsalem” was taken off the screen soon after it started because of financial problems. However, because the success of “Hadmaot Shel Amsalem”, in 2007 Reshef Levi produced another television show, “Ha-Borer” (The Arbitrator) that was based on the style of “Hadmaot Shel Amsalem”. Reshef Levi produced it with Shay Kanot. This television show tells a story of a crime family and takes place in the seedy underbelly of society. This show won great favor among Israeli audiences and is considered one of the most successful television shows of all time in Israel. In 2008, Reshef Levi director and wrote “Lost Islands”, which was nominated for 14 Ophir Awards, won four of them, and considered as a blockbuster in Israel. In 2009, Reshef Levi was appointed as the official playwright of Habima Theatre, the national theatre of Israel. During these years, he presented a number of plays there. His last film, “Hunting Elephants”, which came out in 2013, could not reproduce the same success that “Lost Islands” achieved. The big number of the critics gave him negative reviews, despite, the film’s high budget relatively to a domestic film, and the participation of known actors like Moshe Ivgy, and world-famous actors like Patrick Stewart.

== Filmography ==
Year	Title	Additional information
2003	Hadmaot Shel Amsalem	It was taken off the screen soon after it started because of financial problems
2004	Ahava Colombianit	Stars Mili Avital. Details the lead in to the marriage of a young couple and the stories of their respective friends.
2007	“Ha-Borer” (The Arbitrator)	It is considered one of the most successful television shows of all time in Israel
2008	"Lost Islands"	It was nominated for 14 Ophir Awards and won 4 of them
2013	“Hunting Elephants"	Patrick Stewart participated in the film
2019	Nehama	

== Personal life ==
Levi is married to Tali and they have seven children, among them Tamuz Levi, who played his daughter in the television series "Nechama". He resides in Kfar Saba.

Two of his brothers are Retsef Levi, a professor at MIT, and the writer Yannets Levi.
