= Dimona Twist =

- דימונה טוויסט
- Directed by: Michal Aviad
- Produced by: Ayelet Kait; Amir Harel
- Cinematography: Sharon "Shrek" De-Mayo, Itai Marom
- Edited by: Nili Feller
- Production company: Lama Productions
- Release date: 2016
- Running time: 74 minutes
- Country: Israel
- Language: Hebrew

Dimona Twist (Hebrew: דימונה טוויסט) is a 2016 Israeli documentary film, directed by Michal Aviad.

== Synopsis ==
Seven women arrive to Israel from North Africa by ship in 1950, and are sent directly to the desert "development town" of Dimona, which is in the early stages of being built. The new immigrants were promised a "young, happening city", but instead find a sandy nowhere-land, without even running water. During the next 15 years, the women and girls deal with harsh feelings of separation from their homelands, exile to the geographic and cultural periphery, institutionalized racism and corruption, poverty, and disappointment with the ostensible "promised land". Nevertheless, the women refuse to give up on a life that includes meaning, and one of their creative outlets is dancing the twist.

The film includes archive footage from the 1950s and 1960s, interviews with the women followed in the film, photographs from personal collections and a historical survey of the mass immigration of Mizrahim to Israel, and their experiences upon arrival.

== Production ==
According to Aviad, archival material was difficult to find. Though there was a plethora of material on Kibbutzim (with a largely Ashkenazi population), when it came to Dimona and other development towns (with a largely Mizrahi population), she mostly found footage from image campaigns for overseas fundraising. Such campaigns aimed to show how the young nation of Israel was building up the desert, and often featured European Jews coming to the town to "civilize the primitives" and teach them to cook and sew. Aviad commented: "What could women from Eastern and Israeli war and austerity kitchens teach the women who came from North Africa's rich cuisine? And why did anyone think North Africans could not sew?"

Aviad decided to address the stereotyped views of the women of the development town by allowing them an opportunity to tell their own stories: of immigration, deadly ringworm treatments, loves and losses, and getting together to dance.

The film was produced by Lama Productions, with funding from the New Fund for Cinema and Television, Yes doc, Barbara Dobkin and Mifal Hapayis. Aviad dedicated the film to Ronit Elkabetz, who died that year, and with whom she had worked previously on the film Invisible.

=== Participants ===
- Solange Saranga
- Heuguette Amano
- Alice Seraga
- Esther Ohayon
- Sonya Halleli
- Hava Levinstein
- Ilana Nahmani

== Release ==
Dimona Twist premiered at the 2016 Jerusalem Film Festival, where it won the Van Leer Best Documentary award. It later screened at DocAviv, and continued to additional international festivals, including New York Jewish Film Festival, Philadelphia Jewish Film Festival, and AICE Israeli Film Festival, in Australia.

The film was also broadcast on the YES Docu television channel on September 8, 2016.

Dimona Twist is required viewing in university courses, such as "Ethics and Esthetics - Documentary Cinema and Human Rights" at the Hebrew University of Jerusalem.

== Reception ==
The film was released to rave reviews.

In his review for Maariv, Doron Brosh called the film "spectacular", and writes that its only problem is that it ended too soon. In Haaretz, Eyal Sagi Bizawi commended Aviad's sensitive handling of explosive topics in Israeli social discourse, and her choice to show Dimona and the women's history through their own eyes and voices; This enables the viewer to see Dimona's beauty, not only its problems. Film critic Avner Shavit called Dimona Twist "a beautiful and significant work" with lasting influence.

Yossi Dahan noted that "The word 'feminism' does not appear in the film, but the film portrays the experience of Mizrahi feminists in Israel before being defined as such, independent women who break out of social, family and marital prisons. Who during the day carry out a brave and successful labor struggle against the Kitan plant in Dimona where they work, and in the evening dance the twist."

Forum of Women Filmmakers critic Lior Elefant considered it a mistake to view this story in the context of the antisemitism that led to the women's immigration; instead, their experiences should be viewed through the lens of gender. She pointed out that the women ceased to feel safe when they were threatened by men, and they relate stories of attempts by their families to force them into underage marriage and of domestic abuse. Even regarding issues that are widely discussed, such as racism and marginalization, the story is new because it is being told by women.

International

Mitali Desai, in the Jewish Women's Archive, noted that the history depicted in Dimona Twist is unknown to Jews both young and old, in Israel and in the diaspora; and that "from its memorialization of the struggle of immigrants and refugees, representation of Jews of color, complicated portrayal of the relationship between Jews and Arabs, and profoundly feminist subjects, these stories of Dimona feel perfectly relevant in 2017." Batya H. Carl wrote, "Aviad successfully conveys the incredible fortitude of these women in the early stages of the State of Israel. Her documentary captures the tragedy, fear, and, ultimately, the hope that allowed them to create the lives they desired."

== Awards ==
Year	Award	Category	Result
2016	Jerusalem Film Festival	Best Documentary	Won
2016	Ophir Award (Israel Film Academy)	Best Documentary	Nominated
