= Aya Koren =

Israeli model and actress (born 1979)

- איה קורן
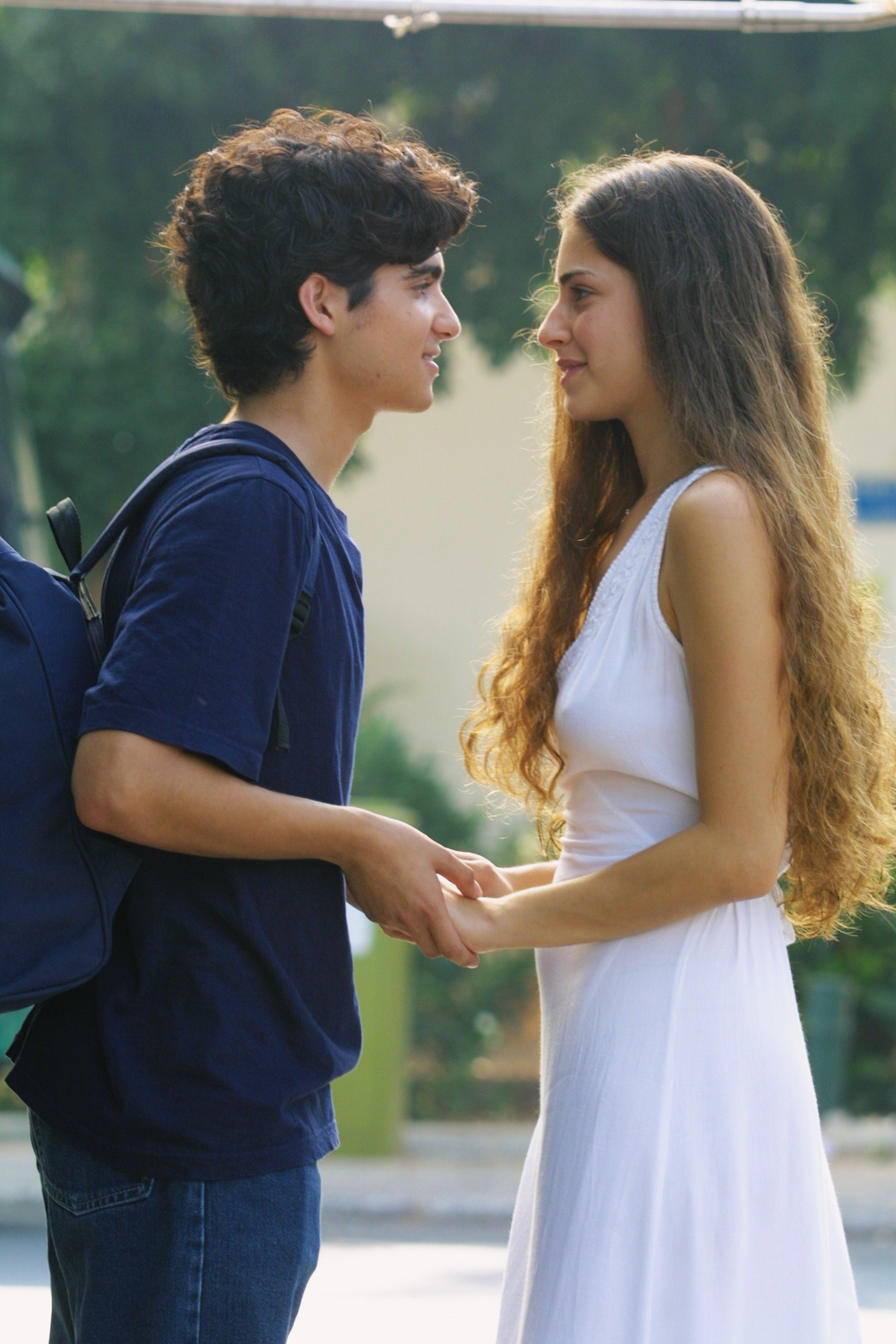
- Koren (right) with Oshri Cohen in Hakohavim shel Shlomi (Shlomi's Stars)
- Born: Aya Steinovitz; October 27, 1979 (age 46); Tel Aviv, Israel
- Occupation: Actress

Aya Steinovitz-Koren (Hebrew: איה שטיינוביץ-קורן, often known as simply Aya Koren (Hebrew: איה קורן) (born 27 October 1979) is an Israeli actress and model. She acted in television and film in the early 2000s before becoming a chozer b'teshuvah (returnee to religious observance). She is one of several Tel Aviv actors who have rejected a secular Jewish lifestyle.

== Early life ==
Born Aya Steinovitz in Tel Aviv, she grew up in Herzliya. She served her compulsory military service in the Israeli Air Force and played in a military band with Yehuda Levi, with whom she would later star in Yossi & Jagger and Minutes of Glory. After her military service, she studied acting at the Nissan Nativ Acting Studio.

== Acting career ==
=== Television ===
In 2000, during her acting studies, Steinovitz played guest roles in the television series Florentine, broadcast on Channel 2, and The Bourgeois. In 2001, she appeared in the series Dakot Shel Tehila (Minutes of Glory) alongside Itzik Cohen, Uri Banai, Yehuda Levi, and Shir Idelson.

In 2002, she played the character of Naama in Knafaim (Wings), a television miniseries dealing with students in an Israeli Air Force pilot course. In 2003 she starred in the first season of the telenovela Ahava Me'ever Lapina (Love Around the Corner) as Alona, daughter of a pizzeria owner, who enters a romance with Lior (Yehuda Levi), son of a rival pizzeria owner. She won a 2003 Golden Screen Award for her performance.

=== Film ===
In 2001, after completing her acting studies, she earned her first film role in the Ophir Award-winning Late Marriage, playing the character of Ilana. In 2002, she starred in Eytan Fox's romantic drama Yossi & Jagger, playing a female soldier in love with a homosexual army officer (Yehuda Levi) who is having a secret affair with his commanding officer. In 2003 she appeared in Hakohavim shel Shlomi (Shlomi's Stars), playing the character of Rona. She was nominated for an Ophir Award for her role. In 2004 she acted in Sipur Kayitz (Summer Story).

== Personal life ==
Koren became a chozer b'teshuvah (returnee to religious observance). She was featured with other Tel Aviv actors who rejected a secular Jewish lifestyle in a 2014 series broadcast on Channel 1. She and her husband, Eyal Koren, have nine daughters. During her second pregnancy, in 2006, she signed a $10,000 contract to model maternity clothes for the for2 brand's fall–winter campaign, but was fired for breach of contract when she refused to be photographed with her pregnant belly exposed.
