= Blush (2015 film) =

- Theatrical release poster
- Directed by: Michal Vinik
- Written by: Michal Vinik
- Produced by: Amir Harel; Ayelet Kait
- Starring: Sivan Noam Shimon; Jade Sakori; Dvir Benedek
- Cinematography: Shay Peleg
- Edited by: Joel Alexis
- Music by: Daphna Keenan
- Production company: Lama Films
- Distributed by: Film Movement; M-Appeal World Sales
- Release date: September 20, 2015 (San Sebastian Film Festival)
- Running time: 85 minutes
- Country: Israel
- Languages: Hebrew, Arabic

Blush (Hebrew: ברש - "Barash") is a 2015 Israeli drama film about teenage lesbian girls. It was written and directed by Michal Vinik, starring Sivan Noam Shimon, Jade Sakori and Dvir Benedek. The original title was Barash.

According to film researcher Raz Yosef, the film is part of the discourse of LGBT rights in contemporary Israeli cinema. In contrast to films such as Yossi and Jagger, The Bubble, and The Secrets, the film offers "new ways of being in the world, life and relationships based on queer temporality that are not necessarily founded on past lessons or future expectations, but rather derive from the desire for the 'here and now.'” Film critic Uri Klein finds that the film serves not only as a portrait of a single Israeli girl in distress but also places this portrait within the broader context of a disintegrating Israeli family.

== Plot ==
Naama (Sivan Noam Shimon) lives with her family in a typical suburb. Naama is used to partying with her friends and having casual sex with boys. Her parents are not aware of her way of life, being concentrated on her soldier sister.

One day Naama meets a new student in school, and immediately feels attracted to her. They become friends and lovers and the new student, Dana (Jade Sakori) introduces Naama to Tel Aviv parties and drug scenes. Naama gets lost in Dana's love and world.

== Awards and nominations ==
Year	Event	Award	Result
2015	Haifa International Film Festival	Best actress - Sivan Noam Shimon	Won
2015	Haifa International Film Festival	Best actor - Dvir Benedek	Won
2015	Haifa International Film Festival	Best screenplay - Michal Vinik	Won
2016	Guadalajara International Film Festival	Best full-length film - Michal Vinik (director)	Nominated
