= Tomer Capone =

Israeli actor (born 1985)

- תומר קאפון
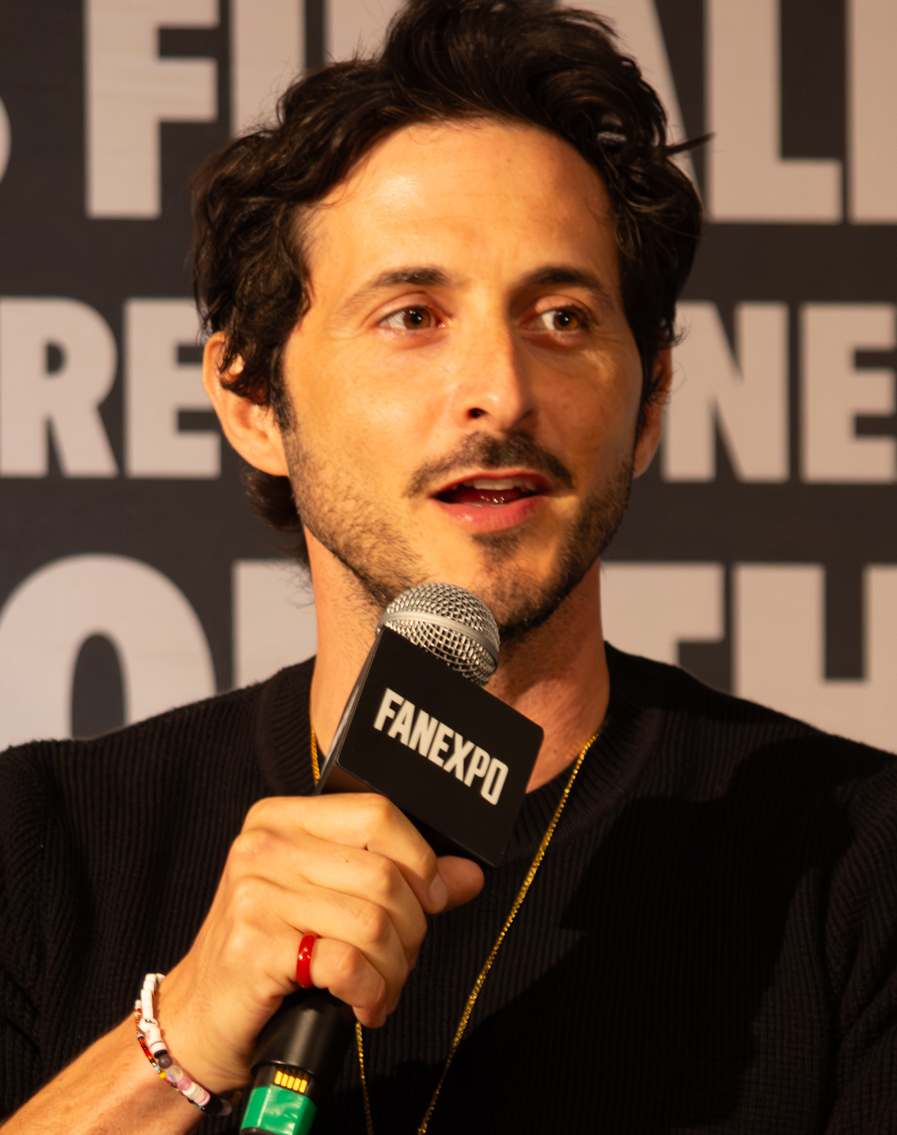
- Capone in 2026
- Born: July 15, 1985 (age 41); Holon, Israel
- Occupations: Actor, model
- Years active: 2012–present
- Known for: Fauda, The Boys
- Partner: Ortal Ben-Shoshan (2012–present)

Tomer Capone (Hebrew: תומר קאפון; also Kapon, Kappon, or Capon; born July 15, 1985) is an Israeli actor who gained international prominence in 2019 for starring as Serge / Frenchie in Amazon Prime Video's superhero streaming series The Boys. In Israel, he starred in several internationally exported television series, including Hostages (2013–2016), the political thriller Fauda (2015), and When Heroes Fly (2018). In 2016, he received an Ophir Award for Best Supporting Actor for his role in One Week and a Day (2016).

== Early life ==
Capone was born in Holon, Israel as the second child of business owner parents and also grew up in Rishon LeZion. His father's family is Sephardic Jewish, while his mother's family is Ashkenazi Jewish.

Capone was introduced to pop culture by his grandfather, and his early influences were Martin Scorsese, Quentin Tarantino, Francis Ford Coppola, Bob Dylan, and Tupac Shakur.

=== Military service ===
After graduating from high school, Capone was conscripted into the Israel Defense Forces (IDF) in 2004. He served as a soldier and later as a squad leader, including during the 2006 Lebanon War.

In an interview with Schön Magazine, when discussing his military service, Capone said, "The only thing I can say about that is I wish we wouldn’t have to have any armies or any kind of defense offense systems in the world."

Capone also discussed his military service in a 2016 interview with Ynet. He said he participated in arrests, checkpoint enforcement, and security operations, including during the Gaza disengagement and in Nablus. Toward the end of his service, accumulated exposure to violence culminated in a mental breakdown. In 2026, the interview resurfaced online during the release of The Boys season 5. Aspects of Capone's IDF service, such as the arrest of an 18-year-old Palestinian woman, were criticised.

== Career ==
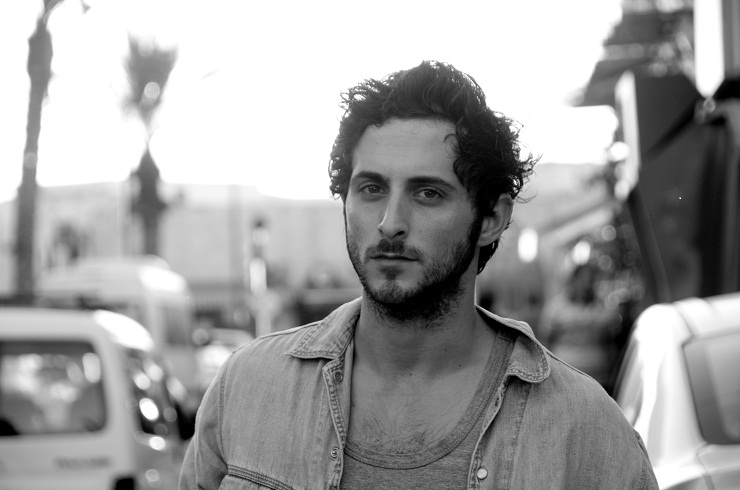
Capone in 2012

Following his military service, Capone traveled through Thailand and India. On his return to Israel, he worked on a horse farm.

At the age of 26, he was living in the Hatikva Quarter in Tel Aviv and enrolled in Yoram Loewenstein Performing Arts Studio. He struggled to adapt to the studio's framework and did not graduate.

Discouraged and working two jobs, an encounter with a teacher and mentor changed his outlook: "As soon as a teacher I loved grabbed me and told me, 'You have the talent, you just need the perseverance and the doors will open. At that moment, at the door, you'll have a suitcase, and that's how you'll live your life,' I changed my attitude. There was something about it that moved me, I saw this picture happen."

=== Early work (2012–2018) ===
In 2012, Capone made his acting debut in the Israeli youth series Galis. He subsequently appeared in several high-profile Israeli television exports, including Hostages and the political thriller Fauda. He also starred in the first season of the Israeli series Taagad. Capone made his film debut in 2015 in the Natalie Portman-directed film A Tale of Love and Darkness after Portman personally cast him. In 2016, he received an Ophir Award for Best Supporting Actor for the drama One Week and a Day.

In 2017, Capone was among several Israeli celebrities who recreated historical photographs to mark Israel's 69th Independence Day. He recreated the cover of a 1967 issue of Life magazine depicting Yossi Ben Hanan in the Suez Canal after the Six-Day War, holding an AK-47. Capone's recreation notably placed a flower in the barrel of the gun.

In 2018, Capone starred in When Heroes Fly, playing a war veteran of a Special Forces unit who reunites with three friends for a final mission in the Colombian jungle. The series won the prize for Best Series at the CannesSeries festival. The series was later acquired by Netflix and became available in early 2019.

=== The Boys and international recognition (2019–2026) ===
In June 2018, Capone was cast as Frenchie in the Amazon Prime Video superhero series The Boys on the recommendation of show creator Eric Kripke's mother. The series premiered on July 26, 2019, and aired its fith and final season in 2026, with Capone appearing in all seasons.

Capone's character was sexually fluid and had male partners, and expressed his surprise and disappointment that this was rejected by some viewers in an interview with Mako: "There were a lot of reactions that there homophobic. I had never been exposed to this world before and I was shocked by the quantity, it was just keyboard bullying. It made me think about the difficulty that people in the real world go through when it comes to their sexual identity, and it really saddened me. On the other hand, there were also comments from fans who wrote to me that Frenchie gave them confidence, because this is a supposedly tough and rough character, and now, they too can be whoever they want when it comes to attraction and love."

In 2020, Capone starred as Moti, the protagonist of the Israeli drama series One on One on Kan 11. That same year, he reunited with his One Week and a Day director, Asaph Polonsky, to film the Israeli short film Long Distance, alongside Niv Sultan.

In 2024, Capone starred in the Israeli romantic comedy limited series Save the Date (Bekarov Etzli) on Channel 12, alongside Adi Havshush and Oshri Cohen.

=== After The Boys (2026–present) ===
Capone was cast as Billy Bones in Treasure Island the MGM+/Paramount adaptation.

== Personal life ==
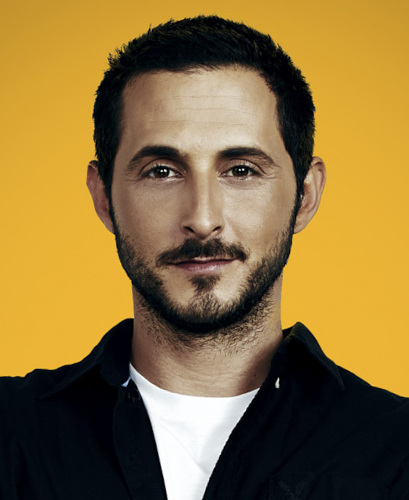
Capone in 2019

In a 2019 interview, he addressed the spelling of his surname: "It's supposed to be with an 'e' at the end, but we don't want people to read it 'Capone' like the gangster. We don't want any misunderstandings."

Capone has been in a relationship with Israeli actress Ortal Ben-Shoshan since 2012.

In 2018, Capone served as a spokesmodel, alongside Shlomit Malka, for the Israeli fashion chain Fox.

In the wake of the 2023 Hamas-led attack on Israel in October 2023, Capone later told Mako that he had received death threats and attempts were made to damage his career. He was in Israel at the time of the attack and had to cancel a work trip for The Boys in Australia. The production was understanding, explaining that there was a wave of anti-semitism in Australia.

In the wake of the attacks, he was among hundreds of actors and celebrities who signed an open letter to U.S. president Joe Biden thanking him for his "unshakeable moral conviction, leadership and support" for Jewish people.

Capone also participated in Israeli hostage deal protests, explaining in an interview with Mako: "I'm not a political animal, right and left are fiction in my eyes, certainly after October 7. I don't go to demonstrations for political motives, I go to stand by the families of the hostages These are the children of someone, father, grandfather, mother, flesh of our flesh, imprisoned in Gaza, and the world as usual. We can tell ourselves stories, but until they come back we will continue to live here in lies, we will be miserable and this country will remain only a shadow of a trace of something that was Israel. I don't have a magic solution, so at least I go out and stand with the families, because I know that we are committed to solidarity and I know that we deserve to see more done than we have in this matter."

== Filmography ==
=== Film ===
| Year | Title | Role | Notes |
|---|---|---|---|
| 2015 | A Tale of Love and Darkness | The Pioneer (Juno) | |
| 2015 | Wedding Doll | Chen | |
| 2016 | One Week and a Day | Zohar Zooler | |
| 2018 | Entebbe | Soldier David Cohen | |
| 2018 | BeMerhak Me'a Meter: Long Distance | Gil | Television film |
| 2024 | Slingshot | Nash | |

=== Television ===
| Year | Title | Role | Notes |
|---|---|---|---|
| 2012 | Galis | Benyamin Berg | |
| 2013–2016 | Hostages | Guy | Main role |
| 2015 | Dig | Nadav | 2 episodes |
| 2015 | Fauda | Boaz | Main role; Season 1 |
| 2016 | Der Tel-Aviv-Krimi | Amir Dawud | German series |
| 2016 | Taagad (Charlie Golf One) | Daniel | Main role; Season 1 |
| 2017 | Eretz Nehederet | Alin-Lin's Date | Episode #15.5 |
| 2017–2018 | Fullmoon | Idan Perry | Main role |
| 2018 | When Heroes Fly | Aviv Danino | Main role |
| 2019–2026 | The Boys | Serge / Frenchie | Main role (credited as Tomer Capon for the first two seasons); 30 episodes |
| 2020 | One on One | Moti | Main role |
| 2020 | BeMerhak Me'a Meter: Long Distance | Gil | Anthology series; 1 episode |
| 2024 | Save the Date (Bekarov Etzli) | Assi Ben Tovim | Main role |
| 2026 | Treasure Island | Billy Bones | Series regular |
