= Michal Vinik =

Israeli filmmaker

Michal Vinik מיכל ויניק
- Born: Haifa
- Occupations: Film director, screenwriter

Michal Vinik (Hebrew: מיכל ויניק; born March 12, 1976) is an Israeli filmmaker, director and screenwriter. She teaches filmmaking at Tel Aviv University and Beit Berl College.

== Biography ==
Vinik was born in Haifa. She graduated with a bachelor's degree in Film & Television from Tel Aviv University.

In 2008, Vinik released her first short film, "Bait" ("פיתיון"), which followed a 17 year old tomboy as she sets out to explore her femininity. The film received an honorable mention at the Jerusalem Film Festival, and was subsequently screened at Sundance Film Festival in 2009, and then in many other international film festivals, reaping awards and positive reviews.

In 2009, Vinik collaborated with Talya Lavie to create the internet comics "The Smile that Is Never Erased" ("החיוך שאינו נמחק"), which was published on the Walla! news site.

Vinik released her second short film, "Reality Check" ("סרק") in 2011. The film is about two teenagers who go out partying in Tel Aviv a few hours before the assassination of Prime Minister Yitzhak Rabin in 1995. One girl is determined to lose her virginity, while the other is trying to find something to smoke. The film premiered at the Locarno International Film Festival, and continued to additional screenings worldwide. In Israel, the film won the Best Film award at the TLVFest International LGBT Film Festival.

Vinik wrote the screenplay for chapters of both seasons of the Israeli television series, "30 NIS per Hour". In 2014, she created her own series, "Mi Natan Lach Rishayon?" ("Who Gave You a License?"), together with Daniella Doron and Talya Lavie. She also wrote the script for the episode about Yona Wallach, in Hagai Levy's series, "The Accursed".

Blush (2015) is Vinik's first feature film. She wrote and directed it. The film is about two high-school girls who are lesbian or bisexual or questioning. Vinik has said that she had trouble finding lesbian characters in Israeli film that she identified with, so she had to create them herself. In a first for a lesbian-themed film, it was widely distributed in Israeli theaters. The film premiered at the San Sebastian International Film Festival, in the "New Directors" forum. In Israel, the film won three awards at the Haifa International Film Festival, including best screenplay, and went on to screenings in over 80 international festivals.

In 2016, Vinik and Mia Dreifus created "Heroine", a film project featuring five short films by five emerging women directors graduating from the Tel Aviv University film school. In 2017, Vinik wrote the screenplay for Michal Aviad's film, Working Woman. In 2018, she wrote the screenplay for the film "Herzl's Susita", together with Shlomi Elkabetz.

The film Working Woman was released in 2018, written by Vinik and Michal Aviad, who also directed.

Vinik teaches screenwriting and directing at Tel Aviv University and at Beit Berl College.

She is one of the founders of the Women in Film and Television Israel Forum, which works to promote equal opportunity for women in the industry in Israel.

== Personal life ==
Vinik is an out lesbian. She has a son.

== See also ==
- List of female film and television directors
- List of lesbian filmmakers
- List of LGBT-related films directed by women
