= UK Jewish Film Festival =

Film festival

- Location: London and other cities in the United Kingdom
- Founded: 1997; 29 years ago
- Hosted by: UK Jewish Film
- Language: International
- Website: ukjewishfilm.org

UK Jewish Film
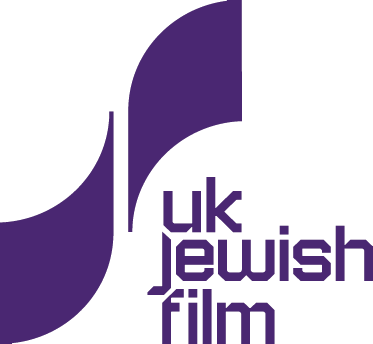
- Founder: Judy Ironside, President
- Legal status: Registered charity (number 1072914)
- Headquarters: London
- Chief Executive Officer: Michael Etherton
- Website: ukjewishfilm.org

The UK Jewish Film Festival is an annual film festival dedicated to world cinema that explores Jewish life, history and culture worldwide. It was founded in 1997 and takes place in November, in London and in other cities in the United Kingdom.

The festival is part of UK Jewish Film (UKJF), which also runs film education programmes for young people exploring racism, antisemitism, Jewish identity and interfaith themes; provides training and networking opportunities for new and emerging filmmakers through its Film Lab programme; commissions seven short films each year through its Pears Short Film Fund at UK Jewish Film and Dangoor UKJF Short Doc Fund. In 2025, it launched its Changing Perspectives Film Fund.

== Organisation ==
UK Jewish Film, whose president is its founder, Judy Ironside MBE, is chaired by Jonathan Lewis. Its chief executive is Michael Etherton.

Sir Sydney Samuelson was the festival's honorary president from 1997 to 2005. From 2014, he became an Honorary Life Patron. UK Jewish Film's Honorary Patrons include David Kustow OBE, Louise and Hilton Nathanson, Tim Angel OBE, Dame Hilary Blume, The Right Honourable the Lord Collins of Mapesbury, Vanessa Feltz, Henry Goodman, Romaine Hart OBE, Stephen Hermer, Zamir Joory, Dame Maureen Lipman, Lord and Lady Mitchell, Tracy-Ann Oberman, Lord Puttnam of Queensgate, Rick Senat, Jason Solomons, Paul Morrison and Chaim Topol.

== History ==
In 1997 Judy Ironside founded the Brighton Jewish Film Festival. Her principal motivation to create the festival was to promote respect and understanding about Jewish cultures worldwide. The festival became a national event in 2003 and was renamed the UK Jewish Film Festival. Over the years, the organisation developed a wide variety of film-based activities and collaborations that were offered year round. In 2011 it was renamed UK Jewish Film to recognise its all year round activity. In 2015 Michael Etherton was appointed as chief executive of UK Jewish Film. He focused on increasing the profile and reach of the organisation as well as on supporting new creative talent through a new FilmLab programme and the creation of Film Festival Jury Awards. He expanded the year-round cinema programme through partnerships with key venues in London, Manchester and Glasgow, developed a year-round education programme for young people, and improved the organisation's film industry profile including through the new UK Jewish Film Festival Jury Awards. In 2021 he founded the UK Jewish Film Short Doc Fund, which commissions 5 five-minute documentary films each year reflecting different aspects of contemporary British-Jewish life. The five commissioned films are premiered at the annual UK Jewish Film Festival. In 2024 the fund was renamed the Dangoor UKJF Short Doc Fund.

=== 1997 ===
The first UK Jewish Film Festival took place in Brighton from 8 to 16 November 1997, with tickets available for £4. Along with screening various films and documentaries, the festival showcased a number of workshops and exhibitions, including an introduction to film-making, a photographic exhibition of Jewish weddings and a pre-Chanukah arts and craft class for children. Holocaust Day was also remembered on 10 November; the day of events was attended by more than 180 children and included a screening of the film Understanding the Holocaust and a talk by a Holocaust survivor.

=== 1998 ===
The second Brighton Jewish Film Festival ran from 14 to 22 November 1998. It opened with the Israeli/Swiss film The Dybbuk of the Holy Apple Field and marked Israel's 50th anniversary with a selection of films on Israeli life called "Israel at 50". The festival also screened its first gay film, Rosalind Haver's Oy Gay, a documentary on gay Jewish life in Britain. Film director Férid Boughedir was a special guest at the Festival and, in the first of UKJFF's annual Celebrity Interview series, Sir Sydney Samuelson interviewed film director Lewis Gilbert.

=== 1999 ===
The third Brighton Jewish Film Festival ran from 12 to 27 November 1999. The Celebrity Interview was with Stephen Fry, again interviewed by Sydney Samuelson. The festival opened with the 1997 German film Comedian Harmonists (directed by Joseph Vilsmaier), which was introduced by journalist and author David Winner. The programme contained films from Canada, the Netherlands, Israel, France and South Africa and many other countries. The South African film was Inside Out, a romantic coming-of-age tale directed by Neal Sundstrom.

A second Yiddish film was brought to the Festival – Green Fields, made in 1937. Other films screened included Didi Danquart's Jew Boy Levi, which was introduced by the film's producer Martin Hageman, and the UK premiere of Anne Frank's Diary of a Young Girl, an animated feature film produced by Stephane Dykman.

=== 2000 ===
The fourth Festival ran from 11 to 25 November 2000 in Brighton. The Celebrity Interview was with Chaim Topol, star of Fiddler on the Roof. Rabbi Lionel Blue's first film, a documentary looking at how spirituality can help people face old age, had its cinema premiere. After its screening, Rabbi Blue was interviewed by Simon Fanshawe. The festival closed with a showing of Matej Mináč's film All My Loved Ones, inspired by the story of Nicholas Winton, who saved hundreds of Czech Jewish children from the Nazis. Minac attended the screening.

=== 2001 ===
The fifth Brighton Jewish Film Festival, which ran from 10 to 25 November 2001, screened Egyptian director Khaled El Hagar's controversial film The Gulf Between Us, about a relationship between an Egyptian man and a Jewish girl in Britain.

The Celebrity Interview was with Miriam Margolyes. At a filmmakers event, "Writing Jewishly for the Screen", Gary Synyor and Paul Morrison were interviewed by Judy Ironside. For the first time short films were shown: these included films focusing on Israeli/Arab relations and a 10-minute short called The Worst Jewish Football Team in the World. A screening of psychological thriller Time of Favor was attended by its director, Joseph Cedar. A documentary about faith, sexuality and religious fundamentalism, Trembling Before G-d, was followed by a panel discussion.

In the festival's first touring programme, films were screened at the Curzon Soho and City Screen cinemas in Aberdeen, Cambridge, Oxford and York.

=== 2002 ===
The sixth Brighton Jewish Festival took place from 12 to 24 October 2002. Many of the films focused on the conflict in the Middle East. There was a performance by the Jewish music ensemble The Burning Bush and Sydney Samuelson interviewed Maureen Lipman and her husband Jack Rosenthal as part of The Celebrity Interview feature.

=== 2003 ===
The UKJFF became a national film festival, changing its name from the Brighton Jewish Film Festival to the UK Jewish Film Festival. This Festival, the seventh, ran from 25 October to 6 November 2003 and opened with Wondrous Oblivion, directed by Paul Morrison, who attended the screening and took part in a question and answer session afterwards. Zoë Wanamaker was the Celebrity Interviewee.

=== 2004 ===
The eighth Festival, held from 16 to 21 October 2004, opened with Sam Gabarski's Rashevski's Tango and also screened the UK premiere of Le Grand Role, attended by its director, Steve Suissa, and lead actor Bérénice Bejo. Forty films were shown, including 30 films at London's Screen on the Hill (now Everyman Belsize Park). Sydney Samuelson, with Maureen Lipman, introduced a tribute to Jack Rosenthal, who had died in May that year, including a special screening of Bye Bye Baby; Bill Nighy was a special guest. The festival toured other parts of the UK, including venues in Edinburgh, Manchester, and Belfast.

=== 2005 ===
The UK premiere of Live and Become opened the ninth Festival, which ran from 5 to 27 November 2005. The screening was at the Vue West End cinema in Leicester Square, with Lord Puttnam in attendance. The film was introduced by the director, Radu Mihăileanu.

2005 also saw the creation of the first Short Film Fund, which promoted film making on Jewish themes. The first winner of the award was Jes Benstock with his short film Holocaust Tourism: Whatever Happened to Never Again, which was premiered at the festival. Other films in the 2005 UKJFF included Everything is Illuminated, starring Elijah Wood, In Her Shoes, starring Cameron Diaz, Toni Collette and Shirley MacLaine, and Bee Season, starring Richard Gere. Bee Season was introduced by Anthony Minghella. The festival also hosted the UK premiere of The First Time I Was Twenty, a tale of antisemitism in Paris.

Venues for the Festival included London's The Screen On The Hill, the Tricycle Theatre, Phoenix and the Curzon Soho. Films were also shown in Belfast, Brighton, Cardiff, Glasgow, Leeds, Liverpool, Manchester and Southampton.

=== 2006 ===
The 10th Festival ran from 4 to 16 November 2006. The Annual Audience Award was introduced, where the audience could vote for their favourite film. The festival opened at the Curzon Mayfair with a screening of the film Sixty Six, introduced by its director Paul Weiland and attended by its leading actors Eddie Marsan and Gregg Sulkin. The Moroccan film Marock also had its UK premiere during the festival.

=== 2007 ===
The 11th Festival ran from 3 to 15 November 2007. The Festival collaborated with Jewish Book Week, screening The Garden that Floated Away, a film about the acclaimed Polish-Israeli writer, Ida Fink. Israeli/French film The Band's Visit opened the Festival at the Vue West End. Alan Yentob was the guest of honour. Other events included: a Sing-A-Long-A Joseph production; an event looking at the future for independent cinema; and promotion of the Zagreb Jewish Film Festival, which was held for the first time in 2007, under licence and in collaboration with the UK Jewish Film Festival.

=== 2008 ===
The 12th Festival, from 8 to 20 November 2008, opened with Eran Riklis' controversial film Lemon Tree. It included a Sing-A-Long-A Hairspray event, the UK premiere of Sacred Language, Spoken Language (followed by a question and answer session with film director Nurit Aviv) and a special preview of award-winning animation Waltz with Bashir (followed by a question and answer session with art director and illustrator David Polonsky).

=== 2009 ===
The 13th Festival ran from 7 to 19 November 2009. Ronit Elkabetz attended the UK premiere of Jaffa as celebrity guest. To celebrate its thirteenth year, the festival included films with barmitzvah themes. Maureen Lipman introduced the television play Bar Mitzvah Boy, directed by her late husband Jack Rosenthal. The Coen brothers' A Serious Man was also shown.

=== 2010 ===
The 14th Festival, from 4 to 21 November 2010, particularly emphasised comedy, with a night of live comedy from Shazia Mirza and Josh Howie, who challenged Jewish and Muslim stereotypes, and an evening at the Everyman Hampstead, where Tracy-Ann Oberman, David Baddiel, David Schneider and other leading British comedians discussed the role of comedy in tackling racism and prejudice. The London venues for the Festival included the Barbican Centre, the Everyman Hampstead, BFI Southbank and Vue West End. The films shown included Mensch (a film from France, screened at the West End gala), The Debt, starring Helen Mirren and Jessica Chastain, and the Israeli documentary Gay Days (screened at an event that explored LGBT activism through filmmaking).

=== 2011 ===
At the 15th Festival, from 1 to 20 November 2011, 75 films were shown, from 16 countries including Norway (Strictly Confidential), Russia (I Shall Remember) and Poland (Joanna, My Australia, The Moon is Jewish). There were special previews of This Must Be The Place starring Sean Penn, and Footnote, directed and written by Joseph Cedar. Other screenings included The Flood, 1981's Chariots of Fire, Barney's Version, The Rabbi's Cat and Episodes 1, 4 and 5 of the Israeli version of The Office. Boyd Hilton, TV & reviews editor of Heat magazine, interviewed Robert Popper, the writer and producer of Channel 4's Friday Night Dinner.

=== 2012 ===
The 16th UK Jewish Film Festival opened at the NFT1, BFI Southbank with the UK premiere of Sophie Lellouche's debut feature film Paris Manhattan. The Opening Night Gala was attended by many VIPs including French film director Sophie Lellouche, Israeli actor Ohad Knoller, British actor Maureen Lipman, journalist and film critic Jason Solomons, playwright Amy Rosenthal as well as UKJF Honorary Life Patron Sir Sydney Samuelson.

The festival, which ran from 1 to 18 November 2012, was the strongest year to date. Attendance went up 16 per cent on the previous year and over 10,000 tickets were sold. The 2012 festival featured the first simultaneous screenings in four other UK cities: Leeds, Liverpool, Glasgow and Manchester. There were 58 screenings and events in London, 16 regional screenings, 54 UK premieres and two world premieres from 23 different countries.

The highlights included a screening at the Barbican Centre of the 1925 Edward Sloman silent film, His People, accompanied by a live score played by violinist Sophie Solomons.Zaytoun, the first film produced by the Israel-British film co-production treaty, was screened twice during the festival to full houses. Set in 1982 Lebanon, the film is directed by Israeli filmmaker Eran Riklis and produced by Gareth Unwin, producer of The King's Speech.

A full day of professional workshops, training and a networking session took place at the London Film Museum in Covent Garden. The Emerging Filmmakers Day included "Life’s a Pitch" where top UK film commissioners explained how to get a treatment, script or project green lit for production, and "Tim Bevan in Conversation with Michael Kuhn" in which the two film producers discussed their careers and the UK film industry.

=== 2013 ===
The 17th festival, which featured 81 films from 21 countries, took place from 31 October to 17 November 2013. It opened on 31 October at BFI Southbank with a gala screening of The Jewish Cardinal, a historical drama about Jean-Marie Lustiger, the Jewish-born head of the French Church and close confidant of Pope John Paul II. Perrier Award-winning comic Arnold Brown was joined by Miriam Margolyes, Bill Paterson, David Schneider and Jes Benstock to unveil their new film project. The festival's programme included The Congress, Ari Folman's animated follow-up to his Lebanon war film, Waltz with Bashir, Afternoon Delight, a debut movie by US television writer Joey Soloway, and Hava Nagila (The Movie). The festival closed with the UK premiere of Eytan Fox's film Cupcakes.

=== 2014 ===
The 18th Festival, which featured 95 films from 27 countries, opened on 7 November 2014 at London's Southbank Centre and ran until 23 November. The festival organisers claim that it attracted more than 14,500 visitors. The films were screened at Arthouse Crouch End, the Barbican Centre, BFI Southbank, Cine Lumiere, Everyman Cinema, JW3, Odeon Swiss Cottage, Odeon South Woodford, Phoenix, East Finchley (all in London), and the Cornerhouse in Manchester and Broadway in Nottingham.

==== Controversy ====
In August 2014, the Tricycle Theatre informed the UK Jewish Film Festival (UKJFF) that it could not host the Festival in 2014 (as it had done for the previous eight years) if the festival continued to pursue a £1,400 grant it had sought from the Israeli Embassy in London. The theatre offered to make up the loss itself but the festival's then chairman Stephen Margolis dismissed this offer as a "publicity stunt", saying that the Tricycle's artistic director Indhu Rubasingham had also demanded to scrutinise the list of films to be shown. The decision led to accusations of antisemitism and The Jewish Chronicle described the decision as "open racism". Rubasingham drew attention to her own and the Tricycle's record, adding: "I am not anti-Semitic or anti-Israeli."

Nick Cohen, writing in The Spectator, accused the Tricycle of inconsistency, as other groups' or events' funding had not, he claimed, previously been examined in this way. Cohen also pointed out that the Tricycle itself accepted Arts Council funding during times that the UK was actively involved in military conflicts. In an editorial, The Guardian said that the Tricycle had made "a bad error of judgment". Sajid Javid, the Secretary of State for Culture, Media and Sport was reported as saying that the theatre had been "misguided" in demanding the festival drop its sponsorship by the Israeli Embassy.

Theatre directors Nicholas Hytner and Richard Eyre both supported the Tricycle's position and deplored those who had misrepresented that position. Hytner also said "Rubasingham and the Tricycle board could not have made clearer their commitment to Jewish culture... It is entirely understandable that they felt obliged to insist that no government agency should sponsor the festival. The Tricycle... has a clear responsibility to make no statement about the dispute that is behind the current conflict. It greatly saddens me that the UKJFF have unwisely politicised a celebration of Jewish culture".

However, in a joint statement on 15 August, the UKJFF and Tricycle Theatre said: "Some weeks ago the UKJFF fell out, very publicly, with the Tricycle over a condition imposed by the Tricycle regarding funding. This provoked considerable public upset. Both organisations have come together to end that. Following lengthy discussions between the Tricycle and UKJFF, the Tricycle has now withdrawn its objection and invited back the UK Jewish Film Festival on the same terms as in previous years with no restrictions on funding from the Embassy of Israel in London." The 2014 festival did not take place at the theatre, but the Tricycle had hoped to hold some UKJFF-related events later in the year.

In May 2015 the Tricycle Theatre's chair, Jonathan Levy, issued an apology in an article published in The Jewish Chronicle, saying that the theatre had taken the wrong decision when it had asked UKJFF to return to the Israeli Embassy the £1,400 funding it had received and that it was now seeking ways to rebuild mutual trust with the Jewish community.

=== 2015 ===
The 19th UK Jewish Film Festival was the first to be overseen by UK Jewish Film's new chief executive Michael Etherton, and ran from 7 to 22 November 2015 with 127 screenings of 84 films in London, Manchester, Leeds, Glasgow and Nottingham. The festival opened at the BFI Southbank with a gala premiere of the film Closer to the Moon. Other films screened during the festival included UK premieres of 5 to 7, Experimenter, The Farewell Party, Amir Wolf's Fire Birds, I Smile Back, Labyrinth of Lies, Look at us now Mother!, My Nazi Legacy and Son of Saul.

=== Launch of UK Jewish Film Festival Jury Awards ===
In 2015 Chief Executive Michael Etherton launched a Best Debut Feature Award with a jury headed by producer and then director of the National Film and Television School, Nik Powell. The jury also included actors Kerry Fox and Jason Isaacs, film producer Michael Kuhn and film director Mike Newell. The winning film was Son of Saul which subsequently went on to win the Academy Award for Best Foreign Language Film in 2016. Chief Executive Michael Etherton commented that "Our commitment to supporting new creative talent has been at the heart of this year’s festival. We were thrilled that the jury recognised the extraordinary achievement of the winner, as well as giving a much deserved special commendation for the funny, profound and warm-hearted Israeli feature The Farewell Party."

In 2016 a further Award was launched for Best Feature Film with a jury headed up by broadcaster and film critic Jason Solomons.

In 2017 a third Award was added for Best Screenplay and the Best Feature Film Award became known as the Dorfman Best Film Award with a jury headed up by double Academy Award-winning producer Simon Chinn. The prize went to An Act of Defiance.

=== 2016 ===
The 2016 UK Jewish Film Festival ran from 5 to 20 November 2016. and opened with Indignation, directed by James Schamus, and based on the novel by Philip Roth. The Best Feature Film Award included Jason Solomons (head of jury), Kim Bodnia, Dave Calhoun, Peter Bradshaw and Tracy-Ann Oberman. The top prize of Best Feature went to Eran Kolirin's Beyond the Mountains and Hills, with Best Debut Feature Award going to One Week and a Day by Asaph Polonsky. Who's Gonna Love Me Now?, directed by the Heymann Brothers, picked up the Audience Choice Award.

The festival programme included an innovative live music and film event based around the 1963 crime thriller, The Small World of Sammy Lee, directed by Ken Hughes. Key scenes from the film were accompanied by music from Gareth Lockrane and Band, inspired by the original be bop jazz tracks of Kenny Graham. The event was presented in partnership with the 606 Club and Sound on Screen.work

=== 2017 ===
The 21st UK Jewish Film Festival ran from 9 to 26 November 2017, with screenings in Glasgow, Leeds, Liverpool and Manchester, as well as in London. Key films included the Opening Night Gala film from South Africa, An Act of Defiance; A Tale of Love and Darkness starring and directed by Natalie Portman, Andrei Konchalovsky's Paradise; Israeli-German feature The Cakemaker; Bombshell: The Hedy Lamarr Story; The Women's Balcony. Archive screenings included The Governess, Mr Emmanuel and Lenny. The FilmLab industry strand, aimed at nurturing a new generation of filmmaking talent, included a session on virtual reality and an industry reception and panel discussion.

The Dorfman Best Film Award Jury was headed up by Academy Award-winning producer Simon Chinn, and also comprised actor Henry Goodman, documentary director Daniel Gordon, producer Danielle Lux, screenwriter and journalist Kate Muir and director Ben Steele. The Award went to An Act of Defiance.

The Best Debut Feature Award Jury was headed up by film producer Michael Kuhn, and also comprised TV producer Archie Baron, film producer Finola Dwyer, editor of Little White Lies, David Jenkins, producer Tracy Josephs and film journalist Andrew Pulver. The Award went to Scaffolding.

The Best Screenplay Award was headed up by film producer Nik Powell, and also comprised playwright Ryan Craig, film critic Larushka Ivan-Zadeh, producer Marsha Lee, screenwriter Nicholas Martin and screenwriter Carol Russell. The Award went to The Women's Balcony.

=== 2018 ===
The 22nd UK Jewish Film Festival ran from 8 to 22 November 2018, and opened with the Israeli drama Working Woman by director/screenwriter Michal Aviad. The film's themes chimed closely with prevailing Me Too movement against sexual harassment and sexual assault of women in the workplace. Women filmmakers and issues were a prominent part of the festival and female directors accounted for 38% of all directors at the 2018 Festival. The festival also included the UK premiere of Three Identical Strangers, which went on to be nominated for Best Documentary at the 2019 BAFTAs. Other films in the festival included the Venice Film Festival Silver Lion Winner, Foxtrot, as well as The Waldheim Waltz, Death of a Poetess, Unsettling, The Prince and the Dybbuk and winner of FIPRESCI Prize at the Cannes Film Festival, Closeness.

The Dorfman Best Film Award jury was headed up by film producer Michael Kuhn and also comprised Picturehouse Managing Director Clare Binns, actor Henry Goodman, talent agent Anita Land, journalist Andrew Pulver and film producer Michael Rose. The award went to Three Identical Strangers, directed by Tim Wardle.

The Best Debut Feature Award jury was headed up by TV producer Claudia Rosencrantz and also comprised film producer Chris Auty, actor Ben Caplan, director Paul Morrison, producer Dainne Nelmes and screenwriter Carol Russell. The Award went to Driver, directed by Yehonatan Indursky.

The Best Screenplay Award jury was headed by film producer Nik Powell and also comprised filmmaker Josh Appignanesi, screenwriter Phillipa Goslett, playwright Amy Rosenthal, actor Georgia Slowe and TV producer Derek Wax. The Award went to Death of a Poetess, directed by Dana Goldberg and Efrat Mishori.

=== 2019 ===
The 23rd UK Jewish Film Festival ran from 6 to 21 November 2019 and toured 21 towns and cities in the UK until 12 December.

=== 2020 ===
Films at the 2020 UK Jewish Film Festival, which ran from 5 to 19 November 2020, were shown on an online streaming service and via Curzon Home Cinema. The festival opened with When Hitler Stole Pink Rabbit. Key films included Asia, Shiva Baby, Golden Voices, Viral: Antisemitism in Four Mutations, Man on the Bus, The Viewing Booth, A Call to Spy and Honeymood. In total there were 73 films presented including feature, documentary and short films. Two TV series, Muna and Nisman, also received their UK premieres at the online festival.

The Dorfman Best Film Award jury comprised Andy Nyman, Deborah Davis, Gaby Dellal, Gaby Roslin, Philippe Bellaiche and Rob Lemkin. The Award went to Golden Voices, directed by Evgeny Ruman.

The second Young Jury Award for Best Short Film selected White Eye as their winner. The film later went on to be nominated for the Academy Awards 2021.

The Audience Choice Award went to When Hitler Stole Pink Rabbit.

=== 2025 ===
The UK Jewish Film Festival 2025 ran from 6-16th November in 9 cinemas across Greater London. UK Jewish Film Festival Manchester 2025 ran from 20th November - 3rd December, and a tour of 12 other cities took place from 16th November - 4th December. A selection of 8 feature length films, 1 TV series and 4 short film packages festival films was also made available online from 19-27 November for UK territory only.

The 2025 festival comprised 34 feature length films, 35 short films and 1 TV series (online). The festival opened with a Special Preview of Scarlett Johansson’s directorial debut Eleanor the Great, starring June Squibb as Eleanor Morgenstein. Other notable feature-length films included A Private Life starring Jodie Foster and directed by Rebecca Zlotowski, All I Had Was Nothingness directed by Guillaume Ribot; A Letter to David directed by Tom Shoval and executive produced by Nancy Spielberg; The Last Spy directed by Katharina Otto-Bernstein; Nandauri directed by Eti Tsicko, Pink Lady directed by Nir Bergman, The First Lady directed by Udi Ni and Sagi Bornstein; Bad Shabbos directed by Daniel Robbins; and The Governor directed by Danel Elpeleg.

Winners of the 2025 Festival Jury prizes were the Georgia-set debut Nandauri, which took Best Film Award 2025; All I Had Was Nothingness about Claude Lanzmann’s making of Shoah took the Best Documentary Award; and Beshert, starring Anton Lesser and directed by Lewis Rose, won the Young Jury Best Short Film Award.

The key focus on the UK Jewish Film Festival’s nationwide tour was on the short film package, British-Jewish Life on Film 2025. This included films exploring British-Jewish life and stories, commissioned by UK Jewish Film mostly through its Pears Short Film Fund and Dangoor UKJF Short Doc Fund. For the first time, the tour included Norwich and Lincoln and the first screening in those cities of The Innocents, directed by Jonny Weinberg, which explores the impact of the blood libel on contemporary Jewish communities.

== Pears Short Film Fund at UK Jewish Film ==
Currently sponsored by The Pears Foundation, the Pears Short Film Fund at UK Jewish Film offers two filmmakers grants of up to £15,000 (for the production of a short film – drama, animation or factual – on a Jewish theme. The scheme is open to all filmmakers resident in the UK. Pears Short Film Fund films have won and been nominated for many awards including BAFTAs (samuel-613) and Academy Awards (Sidney Turtlebaum). The commissioned films are given their world premieres at the annual UK Jewish Film Festival. Films produced by the fund to date are:

2005 The Holocaust Tourist: Whatever happened to never happen again?..
2006 The Battle of Cable Street
2007 Veils
2007 Sour Milk
2008 Sidney Turtlebaum
2009 I am Ruthie Segal, Hear Me Roar
2009 Schlimazeltov
2010 The Honeymoon Suite
2010 You Must Be Joking
2011 The Other Side
2011 The Squirrel and the Penguin
2012 Hannah Cohen's Holy Communion
2012 That Woman
2013 Happy New Year
2013 The Funeral
2014 The Divorce
2014 samuel-613
2015 The Chop
2015 The Guitar
2016 Memory Songs
2016 Mordechai
2017 The Master of York
2017 The Outer Circle
2018 Starboy
2018 100 Faces
2019 Home
2019 On the Beaches
2020 The Schoz
2020 Women of Valour
2021 Make Me A King
2021 Hold My Hand
2022 The Rabbi's Son
2023 The Doll's House
2023 The Soldier on Smithdown Road
2024 Friday Night Flop
2024 Our Neighbour's Ass
2025 To Fly Or Float
2025 Beshert

== Dangoor UKJF Short Doc Fund ==
In 2021, to mark the 25th anniversary of the UK Jewish Film Festival, Chief Executive Michael Etherton conceived and launched a Short Documentary Fund with the aim of exploring contemporary British-Jewish life in a series of creative and original documentaries of around 5 minutes in length. Since then, the fund has commissioned five short documentaries each year which can be made in any genre or style. The only stipulation is that they must be about real people, real customs or real places and they must be stories about the British Jewish community which have hitherto been untold. Winning filmmakers receive £1,500 to make their film, which is subsequently premiered at the UK Jewish Film Festival in London and then receives a 'mini-distribution' across the UK in the form of a tour to 10-15 cinemas nationwide. The films have also played a significant role in UK Jewish Film's education work around British Jewish identity in secondary state schools. In 2024, the fund was sponsored for the first time by Dangoor Education and was renamed the Dangoor UKJF Short Doc Fund.

2021 Frum Dogs of Hendon
2021 Irene
2021 Underwater with Closed Eyes
2021 Graphic
2021 Sadeh
2022 Shabbos Goy
2022 3 Jokes for £1
2022 Lynn Ruth & Me
2022 Adam’s Tale
2022 The Peacock That Passed Over
2023 The Kosher Barber
2023 Greatest Star
2023 ConEruversial
2023 Growing Up Mizrahi
2023 The Balance Sheet
2024 Torn
2024 Orphaned Burial Grounds
2024 Pini on the Roof
2024 Fridays at S. Cole
2024 The Adeni of Stamford Hill
2025 Ink
2025 Primordial Chicken Soup
2025 Fighting Back
2025 Liorah
2025 Leaving Home

== Education ==
UK Jewish Film runs an acclaimed education programme with schools, colleges, local authorities, youth groups and faith organisations.

Using the power of film, its education programmes aim to:

- combat antisemitism and racism,
- create better understanding of Jewish life and identity,
- promote awareness of and research into British-Jewish heritage,
- improve dialogue and understanding between communities and faith.

In 2015 UKJF's Hackney Roots web resource was nominated for a Learning on Screen Award in the Educational Multimedia category. In 2016 UKJF was awarded Heritage Lottery Funding to develop its education programme Lights, Chutzpah! Action! – an intergenerational project in partnership with Noam Masorti Youth to explore perspectives on Jewish contributions to British film and cinema heritage.

Other projects run by the education team include a Holocaust through Film programme Speak Out and interfaith projects in partnership with 3FF and Insight Film Festival.

== Film submission criteria ==
UK Jewish Film Festival screens a selection of world cinema that focuses on Jewish life, history and culture. UKJF seeks to bring diversity of programming and to promote tolerance and understanding among people of different faiths and those of secular beliefs. Films submitted can be of any length and category (fiction, documentary, animation or short) and should be available on either DCP or Blu-ray with English subtitles (if in languages other than English). A UK premiere is required (with the exception of BFI London Film Festival). Entry forms and DVD screeners must be submitted by the end of June for the films to be considered for the Festival in November. Successful films are notified by the end of August. Entry forms are available on the UK Jewish Film website. Chief executive Michael Etherton discussed what makes a film Jewish in an interview in The Jewish Chronicle in July 2016.
