= Bonjour Monsieur Shlomi =

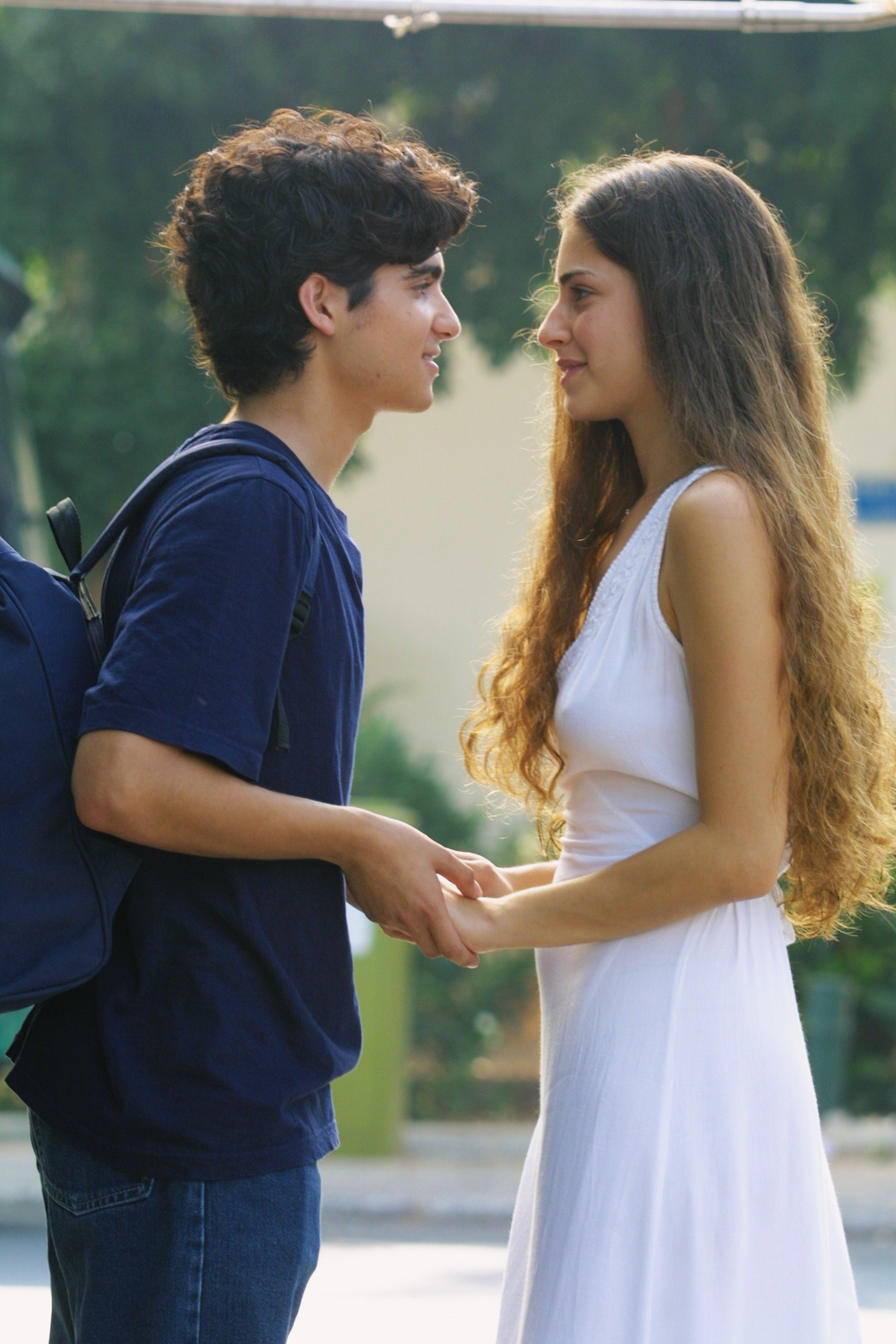
- Oshri Cohen and Aya Koren in Bonjour Monsieur Shlomi
- הכוכבים של שלומי
- Directed by: Shemi Zarchin
- Screenplay by: Shemi Zarchin
- Produced by: Eitan Evan
- Starring: Oshri Cohen; Aya Koren; Igal Naor
- Edited by: Einat Glazer
- Music by: Jonathan Bar Giora
- Distributed by: Strand
- Release date: 3 April 2003 (Israel)
- Running time: 94 minutes
- Country: Israel
- Language: Hebrew

Bonjour Monsieur Shlomi (Hebrew title: הכוכבים של שלומי Ha-Kochavim Shel Shlomi, Shlomi's Stars) is a 2003 film written and directed by Shemi Zarhin. The film stars Oshri Cohen, Aya Koren, Esti Zakheim and Arieh Elias. It received twelve Ophir Award nominations. The story follows a 16-year-old Israeli boy, Shlomi (Cohen), who takes care for everyone in his life but himself.

== Plot summary ==
Shlomi (Oshri Cohen) lives with his jealous and pretentious mother, his soldier brother, and their elderly grandfather. Although he struggles at school, Shlomi is a talented cook and takes care of most household chores, while the adults around him are preoccupied with their own concerns and overlook his dyslexia.

Shlomi tries to remain unnoticed, especially at school, until a routine mathematics test draws the attention of one of his teachers, who suspects that he has an unusual talent. The school headmaster takes an interest in him, and Shlomi begins to develop his abilities.

== Main cast ==
- Oshri Cohen as Shlomi Bar-Dayan
- Arieh Elias as Grandfather Bar-Dayan
- Esti Zakheim as Ruhama Bar-Dayan
- Aya Koren as Rona
- Yigal Naor as Avihu, the headmaster
- Albert Iluz [he] as Robert Bar-Dayan, the father and Ruhama's ex-husband
- Jonathan Rosen [he] as Doron Bar-Dayan
- Rotem Abuhav as Ziva
- Asi Cohen as Tzachi, Ziva's husband

== Soundtrack ==
The original music for the film was composed, arranged, and performed by Jonathan Bar Giora. The theme song - "Od Avo" (I Will Come Again) was sung twice during the film by Haim Uliel, with music by Jonathan Bar Giora and lyrics by Nathan Alterman, performed by Chaim Uliel. Film star Aya Koren also performed a short excerpt from it. The film's soundtrack features oud, bass and bouzouki guitar player Yankele Segal, violinist Nitzan-Chen Razael, ney and clarinet player Amir Shahasar, percussionist Oren Fried, guitarist Avi Ben Dov, Yonatan Bar Giora himself on keyboards and samplers, and film director Shemi Zarhin on synth kanun. Zarhin also contributed background vocals to the theme song. In early 2020, Helicon released the original soundtrack album, composed and arranged by film composer Yonatan Bar Giora, which also includes remixes and tracks not heard in the film. Upon the film's release, a music video for the theme song was also filmed, starring Oshri Cohen and Haim Uliel.

== Reception ==
The film has a 71% "fresh" rating on Rotten Tomatoes, based on 31 critical reviews.

The film received 12 nominations at the Ophir Awards:

- Best Film
- Best Actor - Oshri Cohen
- Best Actress - Esti Zakheim
- Best Supporting Actor - Arieh Elias
- Best Supporting Actress -Aya Koren
- Best Director - Shemi Zarchin
- Best Screenplay - Shemi Zarchin
- Best Cinematography - Itzik Portal
- Best Editing - Einat Glaser-Zarchin
- Best Costume Design - Inbal Shaki
- Best Music - Jonathan Bar Giora
- Best Sound - John Purcell, Eli Yarkoni, Israel David, Ronen Sabo
