= Festival of Tolerance =

Annual film festival held in Zagreb, Croatia

Zagreb Jewish Film Festival Festival of Tolerance
- Zagreb Jewish Film Festival logo
- Location: Zagreb, Croatia
- Founded: 2007
- Language: Croatian, English, other
- Website: festivaloftolerance.com

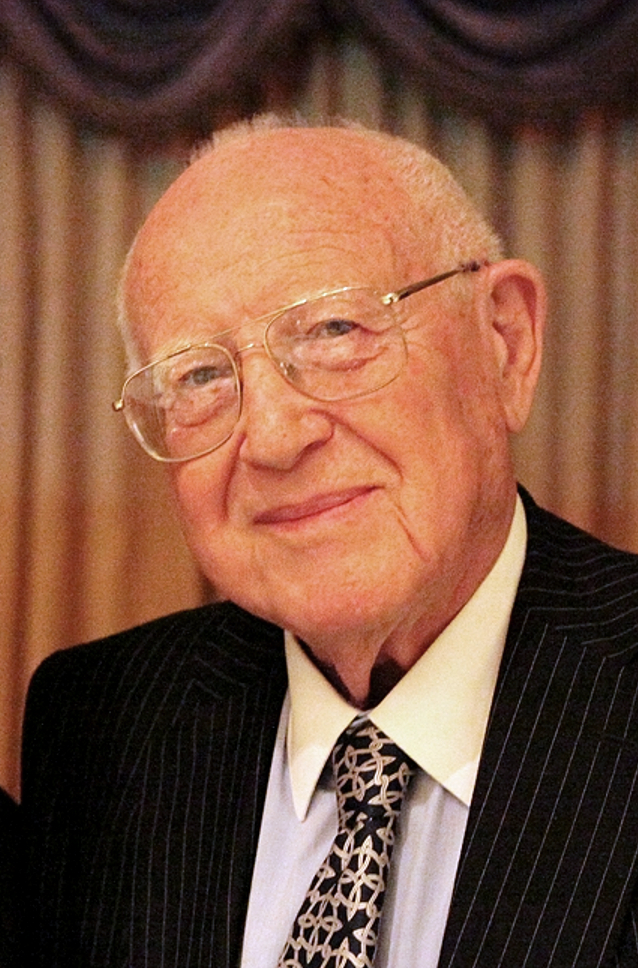
Festival director Branko Lustig

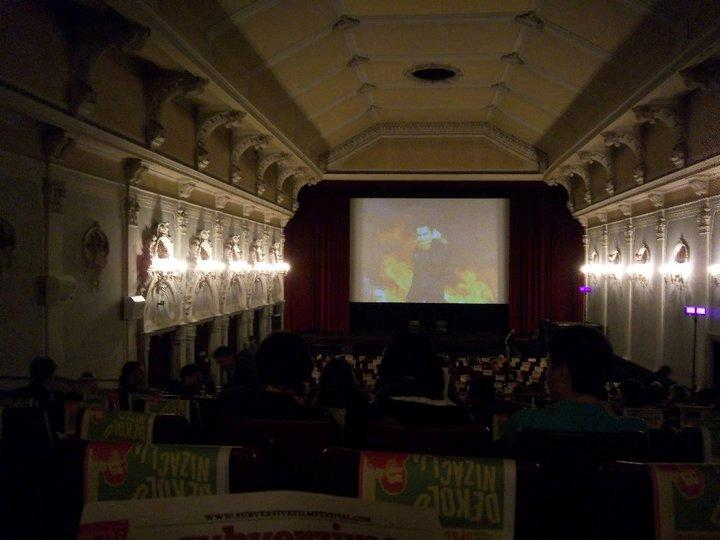
Cinema Europa

The Festival of Tolerance – JFF Zagreb is an annual film festival held in Zagreb, Croatia which is dedicated to the preservation of memories of the Holocaust and raising public awareness about the importance of tolerance.

The festival occurred for the first time in 2007 under license and in collaboration with the UK Jewish Film Festival. It is organized by a non-profit, non-governmental organization, of which Academy-Award-winner Branko Lustig has been an honorary president. The festival takes place at the Zagreb Cinema Europa, one of the oldest art-cinemas in the area. Its film program includes feature films, documentaries and short films. Since 2009, the festival has organized educational morning programs about The Holocaust for students of different age groups.

== Notable guests ==
- Stjepan Mesić
- Simeon Saxe-Coburg-Gotha
- Stellan Skarsgård
- Nenad Puhovski
- Damir Urban
- Milan Bandić
- Mirko Ilić
- James Foley
- Severina Vučković
- Nikolina Pišek

== Support ==
The Jewish Film Festival Zagreb is funded by the Austrian Cultural Forum and the city of Zagreb as the main sponsor. Among others, the sponsors of the festival in previous years were also Jutarnji list, Školska knjiga, Sheraton Hotels and Resorts, Atlantic Grupa, Mirko Ilić, McCann Erickson, Austrian Cultural Forum, Diners Club International, Erste Group, UNHCR, and Jadran Film.

== See also ==
- Branko Lustig
- History of the Jews in Croatia
