= One Week and a Day =

Israeli film from 2016

- Film poster
- שבוע ויום
- Directed by: Asaph Polonsky
- Written by: Asaph Polonsky
- Produced by: Naomi Levari
- Starring: Shai Avivi; Tomer Kapon
- Release dates: 15 May 2016 (Cannes); 8 September 2016 (Israel)
- Country: Israel
- Language: Hebrew

One Week and a Day (or Shavua ve Yom, Hebrew: שבוע ויום) is a 2016 Israeli drama film directed by Asaph Polonsky. It was screened in the Critics' Week section at the 2016 Cannes Film Festival where it won the Gan Foundation Support for Distribution Award. It was one of five films nominated for the Best Film Award at the Ophir Awards.

== Plot ==
Eyal Spivak is shown at the end of a week's mourning for his late son. He shows indifference to his neighbors since they purposefully avoided them when his son was near death. He and his wife Vicky agree to return to their routine, but instead Eyal chooses to go after a blanket they missed at the hospice and finds medical marijuana, prescribed for his late son, there. He smuggles it and decides to get high with the help of a young neighbor and bonds with him. Vicky asks him to book burial plots near their son, but Eyal forgets and loses the plot. Eyal tries to get the plot and even attends the burial process of the person that is getting their plot and finds closure. Vicky who had a tough day gets emotional when she hears from Eyal that they have lost the plot. After the day Eyal sets out to change things in his life and consider life worth living by starting to make his wife smile.

== Cast ==
- Shai Avivi as Eyal Spivak
- Tomer Kapon as Zohar Zooler
- Sharon Alexander as Shmulik Zooler
- Carmit Mesilati Kaplan as Keren Zooler
- Jenya Dodina as Vicky Spivak
- Uri Gavriel as Refael

== Reception ==
Review aggregator website Rotten Tomatoes reports that 90% of 29 critics gave the film a positive review, with an average rating of 7.40 out of 10. On Metacritic, the film has a weighted average score 72/100 based on 11 reviews, indicating "Generally Favorable reviews".

Kenneth Turan of The Los Angeles Times, complimented the film"With a title that sounds standard but turns out to be specific, "One Week and a Day" keeps an impeccable balance between absurdity and sadness, comedy and heartbreak".

However, Neil Genzlinger of The New York Times, gave the film a negative review, saying that "It isn't sharp enough to be funny or profound enough to be touching. It meanders from start to finish, searching for a tone that it never quite finds".

=== Accolades ===
==== Wins ====
- 2016 - Gan Foundation Support for Distribution Award (Cannes Film Festival)
- 2016 - Pirchi Family Award for Best Screenplay / Best First or Second Israeli Feature (Jerusalem Film Festival)
- 2016 - Haggiag Award for Best Israeli Feature and Israeli First Film (Jerusale Film Festival)
- 2016 - Seymour Cassel Award for Outstanding Performance by an Ensemble (Oldenburg Film Festival)
- 2016 - David Camera Award for Grand Prix (Warsaw Jewish Film Festival)
- 2016 - Best Debut Feature Award (UK Jewish Film Festival)
- 2016 - Israeli Film Academy Award for Best Supporting Actor to Tomer Kapon
- 2017 - Special Jury Prize for Narrative Feature (Sarasota Film Festival)
- 2017 - Best Screenplay Award (KineNova International Film Festival)

==== Nominations ====
- 2016 - Critics' Week Grand Prize (Cannes Film Festival)
- 2016 - Golden Camera (Cannes Film Festival)
- 2016 - Krzysztof Kieslowski Award for Best Film (Denver International Film Festival)
- 2016 - Israeli Film Academy Award for Best Directior / Best Actor / Best Actress / Best Screenplay / Best Editing / Best Film
- 2016 - Audience Award for New Auteurs / Breakthrough (AFI Fest)
- 2016 - German Independence Award for Best Film (Oldenburg Film Festival)
- 2016 - Ophir Awards
- 2016 - Centenary Award for the Best Debut Film for Best Director to Asaph Polonsky (International Film Festival of India)
- 2016 - Golden Athena for Best Picture (Athens International Film Festival)
- 2017 - Jury Prize for Narrative Feature Film Competition (Sarasota Film Festival)
- 2017 - Grand Prize for Feature Film (Skip City International D-Cinema Festival)
