= One on One (Israeli TV series) =

Israeli television drama series

- אחד על אחד
- Genre: Drama
- Created by: Matan Yair
- Directed by: Matan Yair
- Starring: Tomer Kapon; Laliv Sivan; Yiftach Klein; Marek Rozenbaum; Nimo Hochenberg
- Music by: Assaf Talmudi
- Country of origin: Israel
- Original language: Hebrew
- No. of seasons: 1
- No. of episodes: 10

Production
- Producers: Yael Benaya; Ayelet Michaeli; Maya Fischer; Gal Greenspan; Roi Kurland
- Cinematography: Yaron Scharf
- Editor: Dov Steuer
- Running time: 30 minutes
- Production company: Kan 11

Original release
- Release: 2020 – 2021

One on One (Hebrew: אחד על אחד, translit. Echad al Echad) is an Israeli television drama series created by Matan Yair, which aired on Kan 11 from 2020 to 2021. Tomer Kapon stars as the series protagonist, Moti, a sensitive teacher living in Tel Aviv.

== Plot summary ==
Moti (Kapon), a 28-year-old teacher, experiences a series of events that change his life; his mother's, his brother's (Klein) impending emigration, his sister getting married and moving in with her husband. He feels that his family unit is falling apart and in order to deal with his difficulties, he starts giving private lessons, helping with their studies and sharing life advice. Through this, he finds more meaning in his own life. He also starts working a cafe, where he meets Maayan (Sivan), a young woman about to get married, and develops a romantic attachment to her.

== Cast ==
- Tomer Kapon as Moti
- Laliv Sivan as Maayan
- Marek Rozenbaum as Moti's father
- Yiftach Klein as Yoni Mor
- Nimo Hochenberg as Dani
- Shira Geffen as Shoshi Mor
- Naama Cohen as Aviv
- Alon Ben-Lulu as Aviv's father
- Asaf Amar as Itamar
- Daniel Mouyal as Shimi
- Asher Lax as Asher
- Naama Shmueli as Shira

== See also ==
- Israeli television
- Culture of Israel
