= Save the Date (TV series) =

Israeli television series

- Hebrew: בקרוב אצלי
- Genre: romantic comedy
- Created by: Uri Gross; Tamira Yardeni; Yoav Tzafir; Tamar Marom; Tamara Salem
- Directed by: Eitan Tzur
- Starring: Adi Havshush; Tomer Capone; Oshri Cohen; Tamir Bar; Rony Herman; Shira Naor
- Country of origin: Israel
- Original language: Hebrew
- No. of seasons: 2
- No. of episodes: 12

Production
- Running time: 38-48 mins
- Production companies: Tedy Productions; Residor Productions

Original release
- Network: Keshet 12
- Release: 25 November 2024 – present

Save the Date, (Hebrew: בקרוב אצלי) is an Israeli romantic comedy television series created by Uri Gross, alongside Tamira Yardeni, Yoav Tzafir, Tamar Marom and Tamara Salem. It follows the love life of a wedding planner played by Adi Havshush.

The series premiered on Keshet 12 on 25 November 2024. A second season has been commissioned, with Ran Danker and Michael Aloni joining the cast.

== Plot summary ==
=== Season 1 ===
Dassi Toledano (Havshush) is a 36-year-old wedding planner who has yet to find lasting love for herself.

As time progresses, she begins to give up on her dream, but suddenly, following a wrong spell concocted by her grandmother, she begins to be courted by four men, her best friend from high school, Assi (Capone), who is about to marry Dassi's nemesis from high school, Maya (Naor), her high school sweetheart, Chen (Cohen), her ex-partner Yorai (Bar) and a Jewish prince from Liechtenstein, Alex (Herman).

== Cast ==
- Adi Havshush as Hadas "Dassi" Tikva Toledano, a wedding planner looking to find love
- Tomer Capone as Assaf "Assi" Shlomo Ben-Tovim, Dassi's childhood friend who reconnects with her
- Oshri Cohen as Chen Rahamim Fitoussi, the former prom king and classmate from Dassi's high school. He is now a divorced farmer and a father. He is also the former boyfriend of Maya.
- Tamir Bar as Yorai, a tortured artist and Dassi's ex-partner.
- Rony Herman as Alexander (Alex) Sebastian von Liechtenstein, a Jewish man from Liechtenstein who turns out to be the prince and heir to the throne of the kingdom. Dassi's mother purchased a sperm donation from him for her daughter to get pregnant. He comes to Israel in order to get to know Desi.
- Shira Naor as Maya Hedva Berger, Dassi's enemy from high school.
- Ben Yosipovich as Liel Ben Ami, Dassi's former high school classmate and partner in Dassi's wedding planner firm. He is openly gay.
- Orna Banai as Mali Toledano – Dassi's mother
- Shosha Goren as Yardena Toledano, Dassi's grandmother
- Tikva Aziz as Perahiya, a friend of Yardena
- Yaffa Levi as Haviva, a friend of Yardena
- Nira Rabinovich as Drora, Assi's grandmother
- Dalik Volinitz as Eitan Ben-Tovim, Assi's father
- Lillian Barreto as Gilat Ben Tovim, Assi's mother
- Shai Avivi as Zvi Berger, Maya's father
- Rona Lipaz-Michael as Tzila Berger, Maya's mother
- Adi Peled as Shira Fitousssi, Chen's daughter
- Yael Sharoni as Tamar, Desi's psychologist, and later Yorai's
- Noa Yehudai as Tehila, secretary in Dassi's office
- Inbar Danon as Sharon, an employee in Dassi's office.

== Production ==
=== Casting ===
Season one reunites several cast members from HaShir Shelanu by the same creators, including Oshri Cohen, Dalik Wollinitz and Yael Sharoni.

Shai Avivi and Rona Lipaz-Michael were again cast as a married couple, having last played an on-screen couple in 2004 for the series, The Bourgeoisie (HaBurganim).

In 2026, Michael Aloni and Ran Danker were cast in the second season of the show.

== Release ==
The series in its original format (in Hebrew with subtitles) has been sold internationally for broadcast on network and pay television, as well as streaming services.

Months after its broadcast on Keshet 12, it began streaming on Netflix in Israel on 25 May 2025.

== Reception ==
Preview episodes of the first season were praised by critics in Israel. Hannah Brown of The Jerusalem Post described the show as an "escapist treat" and praising the casting: "The real draw here is getting to watch some of Israel’s most appealing actors." The season was also praised in a review published by Yedioth Ahronoth, noting that it deftly delivers the romantic comedy genre: "does it right and does it well and manages to survive the minefield that is a romantic comedy." The review continued to highlight the "polished and witty writing" of Gross, the pleasant set design and Tzur's "light and self-aware" direction.

== Adaptations ==
In December 2025, it was announced that Sony Pictures Television will develop a U.S. remake of the show in English, with Dana Fox as showrunner.

In 2025, it was also announced that Greece is developing an adaptation of the series in the Greek language, while Keshet Germany is also developing a local adaptation.
