= Sydney Samuelson =

British film commissioner (1925–2022)

Sir Sydney Samuelson CBE
- Born: Sydney Herchel Wylie Samuelson; 7 December 1925; Paddington, London, England
- Died: 14 December 2022 (aged 97)
- Occupation: Producer
- Children: Peter Samuelson
- Parent: G. B. Samuelson

Sir Sydney Herchel Wylie Samuelson CBE (7 December 1925 – 14 December 2022) was a British film director and cinematographer. He was appointed in 1991 by the government of the UK as the first British Film Commissioner.

== Early life ==
Sydney Herchel Wylie Samuelson was born in Paddington, London on 7 December 1925, to George Berthold Samuelson, a cinema pioneer of the silent film era, and Marjorie Emma Elizabeth Vint. He was educated at the Irene Avenue Council School in Lancing, West Sussex.

== Career ==
Samuelson started his career as a rewind boy at the Luxor cinema in Lancing, West Sussex. After working in several cinemas in the Midlands as a relief operator for the ABC circuit, he got a job as a trainee film editor with Gaumont British, which was then at Lime Grove in London.

After serving in the Royal Air Force from 1943 to 1947, he got a job as a trainee cameraman with the Colonial Film Unit. He then went on to work for Rayant Pictures, for whom he filmed the Coronation of Elizabeth II in 1953. In 1954, he set up Samuelson Film Service, hiring out film equipment. He went on to become the first British Film Commissioner and remained in the post for six years. He was chosen as chairman of the management board of BAFTA in 1976 and was a permanent trustee.

In 1985, he received the Michael Balcon Award, and in 1993, he received a Fellowship of BAFTA, the Academy's highest honour. Samuelson was appointed a Commander of the British Empire (CBE) in the 1978 Birthday Honours for service to BAFTA, and knighted in the 1995 Birthday Honours for services to the film industry.

He wrote the foreword featured in the book In Conversation with Cinematographers by David A. Ellis, published by the American publisher Rowman & Littlefield. He was the first President of the UK Jewish Film Festival. He remained in the role until 2005, and as of 2010 was the UKJFF Honorary Lifetime Patron.

== Death ==
Samuelson died at his home on 14 December 2022, aged 97.
