= Michal Aviad =

Israeli film director

- מיכל אביעד
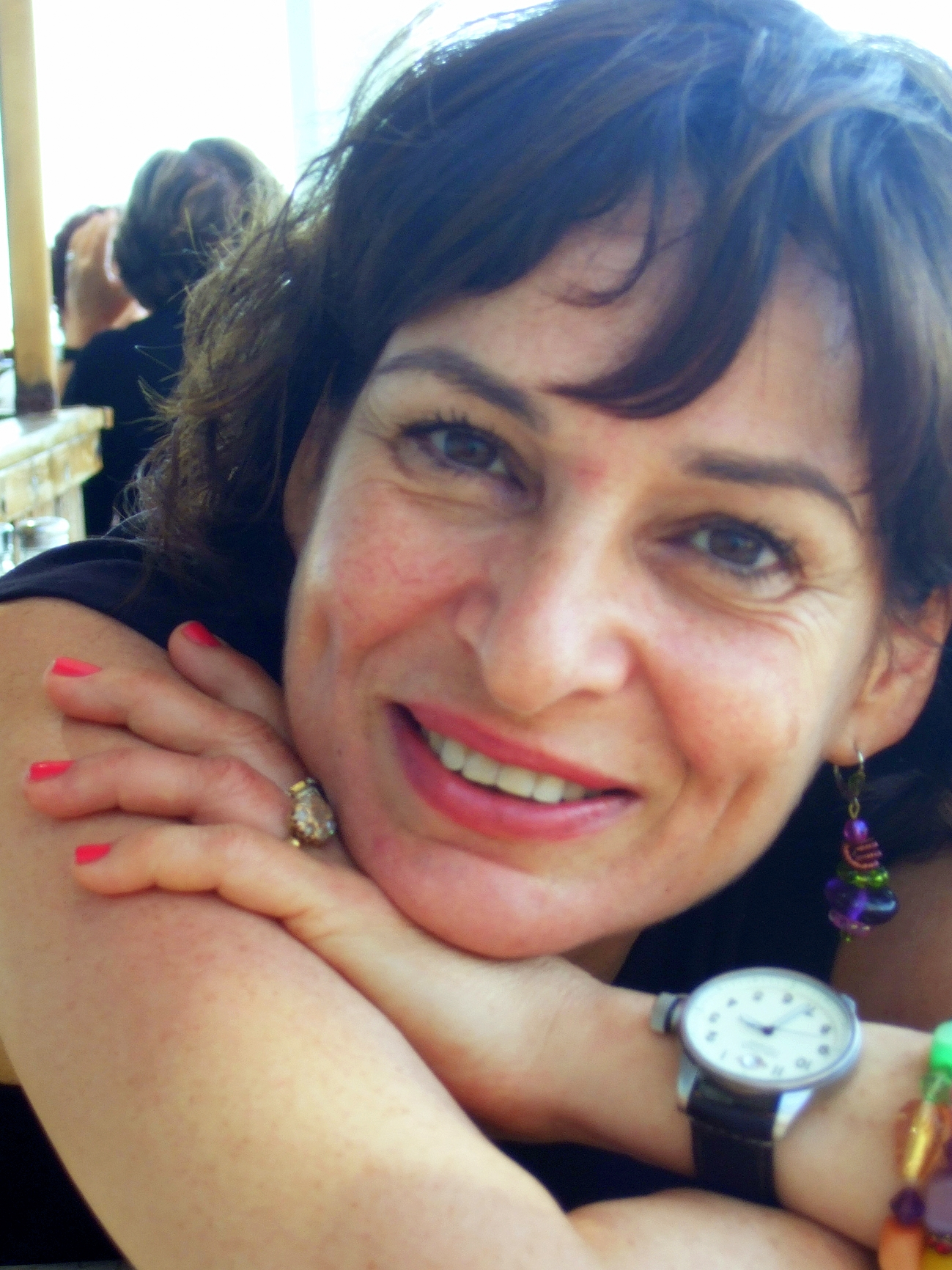
- Born: Jerusalem, Israel
- Occupations: Film director, script writer, producer and senior lecturer

Michal Aviad (Hebrew: מיכל אביעד; born in Jerusalem) is an Israeli director, script writer, producer and senior lecturer at the Department of Cinema and Television, Tel Aviv University.

== Biography ==
Michal Aviad was born in Jerusalem. Her mother was an immigrant from Italy and her father an immigrant from Hungary. She graduated in literature and philosophy from Tel Aviv University. In 1984, she received a Master of Film from San Francisco State University. Between 1981 and 1990 she lived and worked in San Francisco where she made her first film. She is a senior lecturer at the department of Cinema and Television at Tel Aviv University. Aviad's films bring to light the complex relationships between women issues and other major social-political issues such as the Palestinian-Israeli conflict.

In November 2019, Aviad was rewarded one of Israel's most prestigious awards, the Landau Award for Arts and Sciences, endowed by Mifal HaPais Council for the Culture and Arts, which cited her as "one of the most important directors in the history of Israeli cinema".

== Filmography ==
Acting Our Age (1987, 60 min, production and direction)

Acting Our Age is Aviad's first movie, which she produced and directed in the United States. The film deals with the experience of aging among women, and tackles age-linked stereotypes and discrimination. The film received several prizes and was the first to be broadcast within the prestigious documentary slot POV (Point of View) on the American public network PBS. It was broadcast in several international festivals including the Sundance Film Festival and the Telluride film festival in the USA.

The Women Next Door (1992, 80 min, production and direction

The film deals with the involvement of women, both as conquerors and as conquered, in the Israeli-Palestinian conflict. It takes place during the First Intifada. The film was screened in many festivals including Jerusalem, Munich, São Paulo, Chicago, Calcutta, and INPUT 93, and got the Prize of Peace in the International Film Festival in Berlin. It was broadcast on many television stations in the world, including coast-to-coast broadcasting in the US, but never in Israel.

Ever Shot Anyone? (1995, 60 min, direction)

Produced by Amit Goren, this documentary explores Israeli male culture from a woman's point of view. The video was part of the Hong Kong International Film Festival, Feminale, the Leipzig Film Festival, INPUT ’96, London Jewish Film Festival, Washington Jewish Film Festival, Flaherty film Seminar and many others. It was aired in Canada, Israel, Holland, Denmark, Russia and other countries.

Jenny and Jenny (1997, 60 mn)

A film on two teenage working-class Israeli girls, Jenny and Jenny was awarded Best Israeli Documentary for 1997 from the Israel Film Institute. It was part of the Jerusalem International Film Festival, Denver Film Festival, Boston Film Festival, Feminale, San Francisco Jewish Film Festival, Films des Femmes in France and INPUT ’98. To date it was aired in Germany, Sweden and Israel.

Ramleh (2001, 60 min, direction and coproduction)

Produced with the help of the Soros Documentary Fund, Ramleh is a social-political film about the lives of four women in the town of Ramleh, a Jewish- Arab town, and a powerful example to the disintegration of a country of displaced people torn by religious, national and cultural differences. The film was part of the Jerusalem International Film Festival, FIPA 2002, Munich, Prague, Istanbul, Milano, Mumbai, Kalamata, Human Rights Watch Film Festival in New York and others.

For My Children (2002, 66 min, production and direction)

This is personal film about the history and events in the life of one family of immigrants and refugees as seen through the prism of the first days of the new Intifada. The film is co-produced with Israel and ZDF-ARTE. So far the film took part in the Leipzig film Festival, MoMa Documentary Series, Boston & Washington Jewish Film Festivals, San Francisco International Film Festival, Munich Documentary, Visions du réel documentary film festival in Nyon, Switzerland, INPUT 03, Istanbul Documentary, Berlin Cinematheque, Palestinian- Israeli Film Festival in Paris and Brussels and others.

Invisible (2011, 90 min, direction) AKA Lo Roim Alaich

Ronit Elkabetz and Evgenia Dodina star in this story where two women are brought together over a shared trauma; they were both victims of a serial rapist twenty years earlier. Their characters are fictional but the rapist is real, having raped 16 women and girls in Tel Aviv between 1977 and 1978. Therefore, actual victim testimonies are interlaced into the film.

Invisible was part of more than 30 festivals across the globe, was theatrically exhibited in New York, Israel and France and has received the Ecumenical Prize at the 2011 Belin International Festival (Panorama section), Best Israeli Film and Best Actress at the 2011 Haifa Film festival and the Grand Prize at the 2012 Women International Film Festival in France.

The Women Pioneers (2013, 51-min, produced by Eden Productions) AKA Ha'Chalutzot

this documentary made of archives, uncovers the passion, struggle and pain of women pioneers who came to Palestine a hundred years ago to create a new world and a new woman. Research Prize, DocAviv Film Festival, 2013, Best Documentary, Women Film Festival, Israel, 2013, and Best Experimental Film, Polish Jewish Film Festival, Warsaw, 2014.

Dimona Twist (2016, 71-min, produced by Lama Films)

This documentary tells the stories of Seven women arrive in Israel by ship in the 1950s and 1960s and are sent straight to Dimona, a town recently established in the desert. Best Documentary at The Jerusalem Film Festival.

Working Woman (2018, 93-min, produced by Lama Films)

Working Woman is her second fiction feature film. The film is about an ambitious young mother, who aspires to succeed at her new job without paying the price that her boss demands.

== Awards ==
Year	Award	Category	Work	Result
2019	Awards of the Israeli Film Academy (Ophir Awards)	Best Screenplay	Working Woman	Nominated
2019	Mifal HaPais Landau Awards for Arts and Sciences	Arts		Won
2017	Awards of the Israeli Film Academy (Ophir Awards)	Best Documentary	Dimona Twist	Nominated
2016	Jerusalem Film Festival	Best Israeli Documentary	Dimona Twist	Won
2014	Shanghai International Film Festival	Magnolia Award for Best Documentary	Ha'Chalutzot	Nominated
2012	Créteil International Women's Film Festival	Gran Prix	Lo Roim Alaich	Won
2011	Berlin International Film Festival	Panorama Ecumenical Jury Prize	Lo Roim Alaich	Won
2011	Haifa International Film Festival	Best Film	Lo Roim Alaich	Won
2011	Taormina International Film Festival	Golden Tauro	Lo Roim Alaich	Nominated
1997	Awards of the Israeli Film Academy (Ophir Awards)	Best Documentary	Jenny and Jenny	Nominated
1988	Sundance Film Festival	Grand Jury Prize - Documentary	Acting Our Age	Nominated

== See also ==
- Israeli cinema
