= Yossi & Jagger =

- יוסי וג'אגר
- Directed by: Eytan Fox
- Written by: Avner Bernheimer
- Produced by: Amir Harel; Gal Uchovsky
- Starring: Ohad Knoller; Yehuda Levi; Asi Cohen; Aya Koren
- Cinematography: Yaron Scharf
- Edited by: Yosef Grunfeld
- Music by: Ivri Lider
- Distributed by: Strand Releasing
- Release date: August 1, 2002
- Running time: 67 minutes
- Country: Israel
- Language: Hebrew
- Box office: $267,005

Yossi & Jagger (Hebrew: יוסי וג'אגר, romanized: Yossi VeJagger) is a 2002 Israeli romantic drama film directed by Eytan Fox about soldiers at the Israel–Lebanon border who try to find some peace and solace from the daily routine of war.

A sequel entitled Yossi (Hebrew: הסיפור של יוסי Yossi's Story), released in 2012, picks up the story a number of years after the events in the first film.

In 2026, the film is being adapted for the stage by Habima Theatre, Israel's national theatre.

== Plot ==
Yossi (Ohad Knoller) commands a company of soldiers in the snow-covered mountains near Lebanon. In secrecy, he leads a passionate romantic relationship with his second-in-command officer, Lior (Yehuda Levi), who is called Jagger by everyone for his rockstar-like handsomeness and his lip-syncing Mick Jagger. The pair, Yossi and Jagger, lead a loving, yet secret life together, venturing off to be alone and open with one another.

One day, a colonel (Sharon Raginiano) arrives at the base with two female soldiers, one of whom he immediately sleeps with in the bunker. The other one, Yaeli (Aya Koren, credited as Aya Steinovitz), is very interested in Jagger, while she refuses the sexual advances of Ophir (Assi Cohen), who tries to make clear to her that Jagger is not particularly interested in her.

The colonel is there to supervise a night-time ambush, which Yossi is uneasy about because of the full moon, and also because he fears for his soldiers' safety. And indeed Jagger is fatally injured that night, dying in the arms of his lover, who only now is able to articulate his love for him.

At the funeral reception at Jagger's parents' house, Jagger's mother mistakes Yaeli for his girlfriend. She laments that she knew very little about her son, including his favorite song, which only Yossi is able to tell her was "Bo" sung by Rita. The song was also sung by Ivri Lider.

== Cast ==
- Ohad Knoller as Yossi Gutmann
- Yehuda Levi as Lior 'Jagger' Amichai
- Assi Cohen as Ophir
- Aya Steinovitz as Yaeli
- Hani Furstenberg as Goldie
- Sharon Raginiano as The Colonel
- Yuval Semo as Psycho
- Yaniv Moyal as Samoncha
- Hanan Savyon as Adams
- Erez Kahana as Yaniv the Cook
- Shmulik Bernheimer as Shmuel 'Shmulik' Amichai
- Yael Pearl as Varda Amichai

== Production ==
Although Yossi & Jagger originally didn't receive any support from the Israeli military during its production, its popularity proved high enough with Israeli citizens that military bases in the country began to show screenings later on.

== Reception ==
The film received positive reviews from critics. Review aggregator Rotten Tomatoes reports that 88% out of 42 professional critics gave the film a positive review, with the site's consensus being "A tersely told yet deeply felt romance." At Metacritic, which assigns a normalized rating out of 100 based on reviews from mainstream critics, the film received an average score of 70, based on 19 reviews. Stephen Holden from The New York Times "If the situation has all the ingredients of a shrill, tearful melodrama, the filmmaker, working from a taut screenplay by Avner Bernheimer that doesn’t waste a word or a gesture, keeps the emotional lid firmly in place." Ella Taylor from L.A. Weekly wrote "Enlivened by journalist Avner Bernheimer’s delicately witty script and some lively ensemble performances under the direction of Eytan Fox, the film offers a haunting portrait of a generation forced to risk their lives in the service of military goals they’re far from totally committed to." Wesley Morris from the Boston Globe wrote "What the movie lacks in ambition, originality, and grit, it makes up for in pure feeling."

Actor Ohad Knoller won the award for best actor at the 2003 Tribeca Film Festival, for his portrayal of Yossi.

The film did not receive production assistance from the Israeli army but proved to be popular in Israel and was later shown on military bases.

== Stage adaptation ==
In 2026, the film is being adapted for the stage by Habima Theatre, Israel's national theatre. The play is being directed by Ido Rozenberg and written by Avner Bernheimer, writer of the original film. Itamar Kigler has been cast in the role of Yossi. Avraham Arenson has been cast in the role Jagger. The play will premiere in October.

== See also ==
- List of lesbian, gay, bisexual or transgender-related films
