= Invisible (2011 film) =

- Directed by: Michal Aviad
- Written by: Michal Aviad
- Produced by: Ronen Ben Tal
- Starring: Ronit Elkabetz; Jenya Dodina
- Cinematography: Guy Raz
- Edited by: Era Lapid
- Release date: February 14, 2011 (Berlin)
- Running time: 90 minutes
- Countries: Israel; Germany
- Language: Hebrew

Invisible (Hebrew: Lo Roim Alaich) is a 2011 Israeli film written and directed by Michal Aviad. It premiered at the 61st Berlin International Film Festival in February 2011 where it won the Prize of the Ecumenical Jury. The film is based on a series of rapes that occurred in Tel Aviv during 1977–1978. Testimonies of the original victims are interlaced into the film.

== Plot ==
Lily and Nira are brought together over a shared trauma; they were both victims of a serial rapist twenty years earlier. Together they begin to research the crimes and the fate of their perpetrator.

== Cast ==
- Ronit Elkabetz as Lily
- Jenya Dodina as Nira
- Gil Frank as Amnon
- Gal Lev as Yuval
- Sivan Levy as Dana

== Reception ==
Screen Daily described the film as "powerful and provocative". The reviewer praised the lead actresses; "Ronit Elkabetz makes a striking impact.. with her glacial aloofness meshing perfectly with the character of the forthright Lily." The reviewer described Dodina as "Equally fine". The review concludes that Aviad does not exploit the subject matter, but allows the "story of two women dealing with a long repressed trauma be told in an engrossing and emotive manner."

The film won in citation from the jury in panorama category at the Berlin International Film Festival. It won the best film prize and Yevgeniya Dodina won the best actress prize in Haifa International Film Festival in October 2011.
