= Oshri Cohen =

Israeli actor (born 1984)

- אושרי כהן
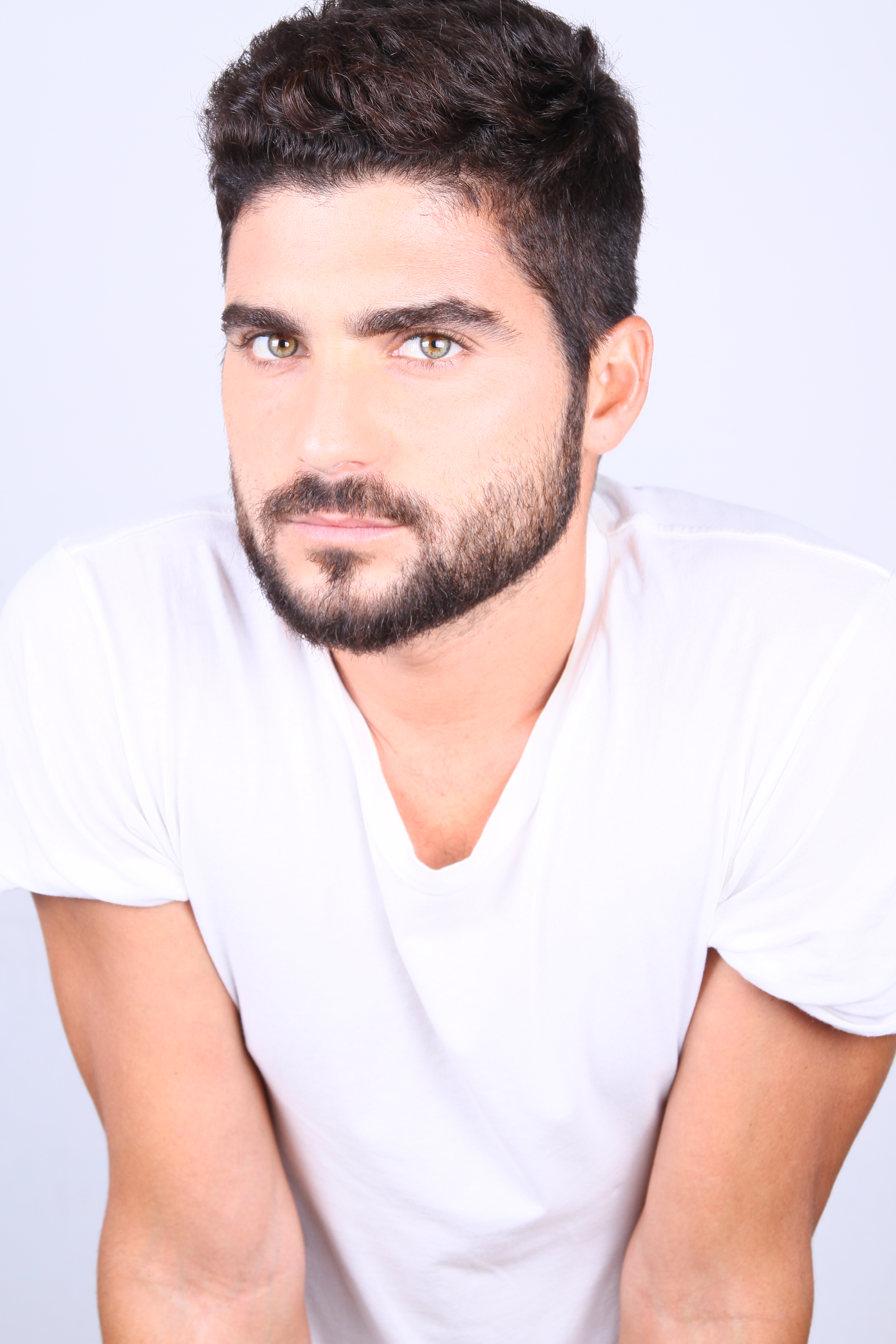
- Cohen in 2017
- Born: Oshri Cohen; 11 January 1984 (age 42); Lod, Israel
- Citizenship: Israeli
- Occupations: Actor; model
- Years active: 1994–present
- Awards: Israeli Theater award

Oshri Cohen (Hebrew: אושרי כהן; born 11 January 1984) is an Israeli film, television and stage actor. He has received four Ophir Award nominations for his roles in Bonjour Monsieur Shlomi (2003), Beaufort (2007), Lost Islands (2008) and Working Woman (2018).

== Early life ==
He was born and raised in Lod in Israel to parents Yardena, a school principal and Nisim, owner of a spare parts business.

Cohen's family is Jewish of Bulgarian and Sephardic descent.

At the age of 16, he moved with his family to Rishon LeZion, where he studied at Mekif Chet High School, majoring in business administration and economics.

Cohen performed an abbreviated six months of military service in the Israel Defense Forces, serving as a printer with the filming unit of the Israeli Air Force.

== Career ==
He has appeared in a number of plays, including: "The Jungle Book", "Erfal", "The Concert", "News Flash" (2000), "Letter to Noa" (2001), "The Stories of the Stage", "Wife, Husband, Home" (2003), "The Indian Patient" at the Beit Lessin Theater (2005), "Moarim" (2006) and "All Life Ahead" at the Habima Theater (2007).

He had an early film role, playing the titular character in Bonjour Monsieur Shlomi (2003). He received an Ophir Award nomination for his portrayal of Shlomi.

In 2005, he starred in Campfire. The story is set in 1981, telling the story of a woman seeking to join an Israeli settlement on the West Bank, despite the protests of her teenage daughter.

In 2006, he joined the cast of the popular Israeli telenovela, HaShir Shelanu alongside stars such as Ran Danker.

In 2007 Cohen starred in the Israeli war film Beaufort, which tells the true story of the last unit of soldiers on the legendary Beaufort outpost. He received an Ophir Award nomination for Best Actor for his role.

He has also starred in Lost Islands (2008) and Lebanon (2009), which won the Golden Lion at the 66th Venice International Film Festival.

Cohen played a guest role of Igal in the fifth season of the American TV series Homeland.

In 2018 he starred as Joseph in the BBC/AMC drama McMafia. In the same year he had a supporting role in the Israeli drama film, Working Woman. He earned an Ophir Award nomination for Best Supporting Actor, for his role as Ofer.

== Filmography ==
Year	Title	Role	Notes
1997	Merhav Yarkon	Yoni Sabag	Miniseries
2001	Inbil		Film
2001	Otzarot HaYam HaAdom	Gal	Film
2003	Bonjour Monsieur Shlomi	Shlomi Bar-Dayan	Film
2003	To be a Star	Dos	Film
2003 - 2004	Ahava Me'ever Lapina	Tal	Israeli telenovela
2004	The Ranch	Oriah	Short film
2004	Campfire (Medurat Ha-Shevet)	Rafi	Film
2005	Ed Medina	Guy	TV movie
2005	Meorav Yerushalmi	Natan	1 episode
2006 - 2007	HaShir Shelanu	Ariel	Israeli telenovela Series regular
2007	Beaufort	Lieutenant Liraz Librati	
2007	HaYisraelim	Avi, Haim's son	7 episodes
2008	Lost Islands	Ofer Levi	Film
2009	Agora	Medorus	
2009	Lebanon	Hertzel	
2012 - 2014	New York	Yossi	Series regular
2015	Johnny and The Knights of Galilee	Itamar	Series regular
2015	What Doesn't Kill You	Ofir	Short film
2015	Homeland	Ofir	1 episode
2016	Four by Four	Oded Bloch	Film
2017	Naor's Friends	Udi	17 episodes
2018	McMafia	Joseph	Series regular
2018	Working Woman	Ofer	Film
2018 - 2019	PMTA	Dor Kaminsky	Series regular
2021	Project Out		TV miniseries
2022	Silent	Aviv	Film
2022	Chanshi	Oz	TV series
2023	The Engineer		Film
2024	Trust No One	Gal Nawi	Series regular
2024	Save the Date	Chen Rahamim Fitoussi	Series regular

== Awards and nominations ==
Year	Award	Category	Nominated work	Result	Ref.
2003	Ophir Award	Best Actor	Bonjour Monsieur Shlomi	Nominated	
2006	Israeli Theater's award	Promise of the Year	The Indian patient	Won	
2007	Ophir Award	Best Actor	Beaufort	Nominated	
2008	Ophir Award	Best Supporting Actor	Lost Islands	Nominated	
2019	Ophir Award	Best Supporting Actor	Working Woman	Nominated	
